= News values =

Criteria that influence the selection of events as published news

News values are "criteria that influence the selection and presentation of events as published news." These values help explain what makes something "newsworthy."

Journalists use news values to decide which events will be reported on and how they will be presented to their viewers. Journalists explain why some events deserve widespread coverage and why others do not. Johan Galtung and Mari Hulmboe Ruge (1956) identified what influences news selection. Factors that were taken into account include: Impact on society, current conflict, prominence, negativity, and proximity. By analyzing international news in Norwegian newspapers, these journalists found stories that include the criteria they’re looking for. The stories involved conflict, major figures, or significant events (which were more likely to make it to final publishing). The criteria that these journalists implemented were shown across multiple news outlets, indicating a degree of universality in how editors select news articles. In the present day, Journalists have further explored and applied these values in practice. Along with the other guidelines, it is as important to follow organizational routines, deadlines, and understand audience expectations before covering an important event. These two together become the foundation of covering news in general. In newsrooms today, these foundational works provide a framework for deciding what news is selected.

News values are not universal and can vary between different cultures. Among the many lists of news values that have been drawn up by scholars and journalists, some attempt to describe news practices across cultures, while others have become remarkably specific to the press of particular (often Western) nations. In the Western tradition, decisions on the selection and prioritization of news are made by editors on the basis of their experience and intuition, although analysis by Johan Galtung and Mari Holmboe Ruge showed that several factors are consistently applied across a range of news organizations. Their theory was tested on the news presented in four different Norwegian newspapers from the Congo and Cuban crisis of July 1960 and the Cyprus crisis of March–April 1964. Results were mainly consistent with their theory and hypotheses. Galtung later said that the media have misconstrued his work and become far too negative, sensational, and adversarial.

Methodologically and conceptually, news values can be approached from four different perspectives: material (focusing on the material reality of events), cognitive (focusing on people's beliefs and value systems), social (focusing on journalistic practice), and discursive (focusing on the discourse). A discursive perspective tries to systematically examine how news values such as negativity, proximity, eliteness, and others, are constructed through words and images in published news stories. This approach is influenced by linguistics and social semiotics, and is called "discursive news values analysis" (DNVA). It focuses on the "distortion" step in Galtung and Ruge's chain of news communication, by analysing how events are discursively constructed as newsworthy.

== History ==
Initially labelled "news factors," news values are widely credited to Johan Galtung and Mari Holmboe Ruge. In their seminal 1965 study, Galtung and Ruge put forward a system of twelve factors describing events that together are used as defining "newsworthiness." Focusing on newspapers and broadcast news, Galtung and Ruge devised a list describing what they believed were significant contributing factors as to how the news is constructed. They proposed a "chain of news communication," which involves processes of selection (the more an event satisfies the "news factors," the more likely it is selected as news), distortion (accentuating the newsworthy factors of the event, once it has been selected), and replication (selection and distortion are repeated at all steps in the chain from event to reader). Furthermore, three basic hypotheses are presented by Galtung and Ruge: the additivity hypothesis that the more factors an event satisfies, the higher the probability that it becomes news; the complementary hypothesis that the factors will tend to exclude each other; and the exclusion hypothesis that events that satisfy none or very few factors will not become news.

In 2001, the influential 1965 study was updated by Tony Harcup and Deirdre O'Neill, in a study of the British press. The findings of a content analysis of three major national newspapers in the UK were used to critically evaluate Galtung and Ruge's original criteria and to propose a contemporary set of news values. Forty years on, they found some notable differences, including the rise of celebrity news and that good news (as well as bad news) was a significant news value, as well as the newspaper's own agenda. They examined three tabloid newspapers.

== Contemporary news values ==
In a rapidly evolving market, achieving relevance, giving audiences the news they want and find interesting, is an increasingly important goal for media outlets seeking to maintain market share. This has made news organizations more open to audience input and feedback, and forced them to adopt and apply news values that attract and keep audiences. Given these changes and the rapid rise of digital technology in recent years, Harcup and O'Neill updated their 2001 study in 2016, while other scholars have analysed news values in viral news shared via social media. The growth of interactive media and citizen journalism is fast altering the traditional distinction between news producer and passive audience and may in future lead to a redefinition of what "news" means and the role of the news industry.

=== Modern Developments ===
Harcup, Tony, and Deirdre O’Neill. "What is News? News values revisited (There is a significant influence on how news values are applied through online media and different social platforms. Harcup and O’Neill (2017) state that factors such as shareability and immediacy increasingly determine what gets reported. News reports that are likely to generate clicks may receive more attention, while traditional values like conflict and prominence remain important but interact with digital metrics. Tony Harcup (2015) states that an active audience that gives feedback and quick distribution has changed editorial priorities, resulting in a faster and more responsive coverage.

== Types of news values ==
A variety of external and internal pressures influence journalistic decisions during the news-making process, which can sometimes lead to bias or unethical reporting. Many different factors have the potential to influence whether an event is first noticed by a news organisation, second whether a story will be written about that event, third, how that story is written, and fourth whether this story will end up being published as news and if so, where it is placed. Therefore, "there is no end to lists of news criteria." There are multiple competing lists of news values (including Galtung & Ruge's news factors, and others put forward by Schlesinger, Bell, Bednarek & Caple), with considerable overlap but also disagreement as to what should be included.

News values can relate to aspects of events and actors, or to aspects of news gathering and processing:

Values in news actors and events:

- Frequency: Events that occur suddenly and fit well with the news organization's schedule are more likely to be reported than those that occur gradually or at inconvenient times of day or night. Long-term trends are not likely to receive much coverage.
- Timeliness: Events that have only just happened, are current, ongoing, or are about to happen are newsworthy.
- Familiarity: To do with people or places close to the target audience. Others prefer the term Proximity for this news value, which includes geographical and cultural proximity (see "meaningfulness").
- Negativity: Bad news is more newsworthy than good news. Sometimes described as "the basic news value." Conversely, it has also been suggested that Positivity is a news value in certain cases (such as sports news, science news, feel-good tabloid stories).
- Conflict: Opposition of people or forces resulting in a dramatic effect. Events with conflict are often quite newsworthy. Sometimes included in Negativity rather than listed as a separate news value.
- Unexpectedness: Events that are out of the ordinary, unexpected, or rare are more newsworthy than routine, unsurprising events.
- Unambiguity: Events whose implications are clear make for better copy than those that are open to more than one interpretation, or where any understanding of the implications depends on first understanding the complex background in which the events take place.
- Personalization: Events that can be portrayed as the actions of individuals will be more attractive than one in which there is no such "human interest." Personalization is about whether an event can be contextualised in personal terms (affecting or involving specific, "ordinary" people, not the generalised masses).
- Meaningfulness: This relates to the sense of identification the audience has with the topic. "Cultural proximity" is a factor here—events concerned with people who speak the same language, look the same, and share the same preoccupations as the audience receive more coverage than those concerned with people who speak different languages, look different and have different preoccupations. A related term is Relevance, which is about the relevance of the event as regards the target readers/viewers own lives or how close it is to their experiences. Impact refers more generally to an event's impact, on the target audience, or on others. An event with significant consequences (high impact) is newsworthy.
- Eliteness: Events concerned with global powers receive more attention than those concerned with less influential nations. Events concerned with the rich, powerful, famous and infamous get more coverage. Also includes the eliteness of sources – sometimes called Attribution.
- Superlativeness: Events with a large scale or scope or with high intensity are newsworthy.
- Consonance: Events that fit with the media's expectations and preconceptions receive more coverage than those that defy them (and for which they are thus unprepared). Note this appears to conflict with unexpectedness above. However, consonance really refers to the media's readiness to report an item. Consonance has also been defined as relating to editors' stereotypes and their mental scripts for how events typically proceed.

Values in the news process:

- Continuity: A story that is already in the news gathers a kind of inertia. This is partly because the media organizations are already in place to report the story, and partly because previous reportage may have made the story more accessible to the public (making it less ambiguous).
- Composition: Stories must compete with one another for space in the media. For instance, editors may seek to provide a balance of different types of coverage, so that if there is an excess of foreign news for instance, the least important foreign story may have to make way for an item concerned with the domestic news. In this way the prominence given to a story depends not only on its own news values but also on those of competing stories.
- Competition: Commercial or professional competition between media may lead journalists to endorse the news value given to a story by a rival.
- Co-option: A story that is only marginally newsworthy in its own right may be covered if it is related to a major running story.
- Prefabrication: A story that is marginal in news terms but written and available may be selected ahead of a much more newsworthy story that must be researched and written from the ground up.
- Predictability: An event is more likely to be covered if it has been pre-scheduled.
- Story impact: The impact of a published story (not the event), for example whether it is being shared widely (sometimes called Shareability), read, liked, commented-on. To be qualified as shareable, a story arguably has to be simple, emotional, unexpected and triggered. Engaging with such analytics is now an important part of newsroom practice.
- Time constraints: Traditional news media such as radio, television and daily newspapers have strict deadlines and a short production cycle, which selects for items that can be researched and covered quickly.
- Logistics: Although eased by the availability of global communications even from remote regions, the ability to deploy and control production and reporting staff, and functionality of technical resources can determine whether a story is covered.
- Data: Media need to back up all of their stories with data in order to remain relevant and reliable. Reporters prefer to look at raw data in order to be able to take an unbiased perspective. An alternative term is Facticity – the favouring of facts and figures in hard news.

One of the key differences in relation to these news values is whether they relate to events or stories. For example, composition and co-option both relate to the published news story. These are news values that concern how news stories fit with the other stories around them. The aim here is to ensure a balanced spread of stories with minimal duplication across a news program or edition. Such news values are qualitatively different from news values that relate to aspects of events, such as Eliteness (the elite status of news actors or sources) or Proximity (the closeness of the event's location to the target audience).

=== Prominence ===
Prominence is a news value that reflects the importance of certain individuals, groups, or institutions involved in an event. Stories are more likely to be reported when they involve popular political leaders, celebrities, or influential organizations. Tony Harcup and Deirdre O’Neill (2001) modernized Galtung and Ruge’s original structure to include prominence. This update emphasizes that modern news increasingly focuses on well-known figures and high-visibility events. These factors help the news gain attention because they are all easily recognizable for audiences. Prominence can also interact with other news values. A large-scale conflict involving notable figures is more likely to be covered than similar events involving less-known actors. Prominence has continued to shape journalists' decisions, demonstrating that news values evolve over time and adapt to the media environment.

=== Conflict ===
Conflict is an important news value in journalism. Events involving disagreement, tension, or opposition naturally draws the reader’s attention. Referring to Galtung and Ruge (1965), articles that involve fights between individuals, groups, or even countries are far more likely to be published than other stories. Most of the documented papers include: Armed conflicts, societal protests, and any conflict that involves two or more parties that oppose each other. These events are actually proven to have a higher chance of being reported. Dramatic, urgent, and detrimental arguments are factors that increase audience interest. Conflict also allows reporters to shape the presentation of certain events. Especially in politics, journalists are given the opportunity to make a stance on the conflict which allows for a persuasive style of writing. This makes the reader more engaged in the story. Scholars note that the presence of conflict often results in extensive coverage and repeated updates for weeks. By examining conflict as a key part of journalism, readers can understand why wars, protests, or political fights are happening. The reason why conflict dominates media coverage is simply because that's what intrigues the reader.

=== Proximity and Negativity ===
Additional factors that influence news coverage are proximity and negativity. Negativity describes when the media prioritizes stories about disasters, crimes, and other adverse developments, while proximity refers to how close an event is to the audience geographically, culturally, or socially. Local events affecting communities directly are more likely to be covered by the news because they are immediately understandable. Galtung and Ruge (1965) found that proximity and negativity consistently increase the chance of coverage, while Herbert Gans (1979) states that newsroom routines often strengthen their influence. For example, natural disasters and local tragedies receive substantial attention, while similar events in more distant locations may receive less coverage. Proximity and negativity also influences the story placement and importance. Editors prioritize content that captures attention from the audience. These values help explain why the news tends to focus on “bad news” in familiar locations, reflecting both universal editorial principles and the practical realities of newsroom considerations.

== Audience perceptions of news ==
=== Journalist vs Audience ===
Conventional models concentrate on what the journalist perceives as news. But the news process is a two-way transaction, involving both news producer (the journalist) and the news receiver (the audience), although the boundary between the two is rapidly blurring with the growth of citizen journalism and interactive media.

=== Audience Perception and Risk Signals ===
Little has been done to define equivalent factors that determine audience perception of news. This is largely because it would appear impossible to define a common factor, or factors, that generate interest in a mass audience. Basing his judgement on many years as a newspaper journalist Hetherington states that: "...anything which threatens people's peace, prosperity and well being is news and likely to make headlines."Similarly, Whyte-Venables suggests audiences may interpret news as a risk signal. Psychologists and primatologists have shown that apes and humans constantly monitor the environment for information that may signal the possibility of physical danger or threat to the individual's social position. This receptiveness to risk signals is a powerful and virtually universal survival mechanism. A "risk signal" is characterized by two factors, an element of change (or uncertainty) and the relevance of that change to the security of the individual. The same two conditions are observed to be characteristic of news.

=== Security Concern and Relevance ===
The news value of a story, if defined in terms of the interest it carries for an audience, is determined by the degree of change it contains and the relevance that change has for the individual or group. Analysis shows that journalists and publicists manipulate both the element of change and relevance ('security concern') to maximize, or some cases play down, the strength of a story. Security concern is proportional to the relevance of the story for the individual, his or her family, social group and societal group, in declining order. At some point there is a Boundary of Relevance, beyond which the change is no longer perceived to be relevant, or newsworthy. This boundary may be manipulated by journalists, power elites and communicators seeking to encourage audiences to exclude, or embrace, certain groups: for instance, to distance a home audience from the enemy in time of war, or conversely, to highlight the plight of a distant culture so as to encourage support for aid programs.

=== Political Usefulness Bias ===
In 2018, Hal Pashler and Gail Heriot published a study showing that perceptions of newsworthiness tend to be contaminated by a political usefulness bias. In other words, individuals tend to view stories that give them "ammunition" for their political views as more newsworthy. They give credence to their own views.

== Evolutionary perspectives ==
An evolutionary psychology explanation for why negative news have a higher news value than positive news starts with the empirical observation that the human perceptive system and lower level brain functions have difficulty distinguishing between media stimuli and real stimuli. These lower level brain mechanisms which function on a subconscious level make basic evaluations of perceptive stimuli, focus attention on important stimuli, and start basic emotional reactions. Research has also found that the brain differentiates between negative and positive stimuli and reacts quicker and more automatically to negative stimuli which are also better remembered. This likely has evolutionary explanations with it often being important to quickly focus attention on, evaluate, and quickly respond to threats. While the reaction to a strong negative stimulus is to avoid, a moderately negative stimulus instead causes curiosity and further examination. Negative media news is argued to fall into the latter category which explains their popularity. Lifelike audiovisual media are argued to have particularly strong effects compared to reading.

Women have on average stronger avoidance reactions to moderately negative stimuli. Men and women also differ on average in how they enjoy, evaluate, remember, comprehend, and identify with the people in news depending on if the news are negatively or positively framed. The stronger avoidance reaction to moderately negative stimuli has been explained as it being the role of men in evolutionary history to investigate and potentially respond aggressively to threats while women and children withdrew. It has been claimed that negative news are framed according to male preferences by the often male journalists who cover such news and that a more positive framing may attract a larger female audience. However, other scholars have urged caution as regards evolutionary psychology's claims about gender differences.

== Applications in Journalism ==
Not only are news values theoretical concepts, but they actively guide journalistic practice. Editors and reporters use these values to determine which stories to cover and how to frame events. Gans (1979) states that practical constraints, such as staff availability and audience expectations, shape the application of news values and influences the final content. Similarly, Harcup (2015) explains that editors balance organizational goals and reader interest, applying news values to prioritize stories effectively. The relationship between theory and practice shows that news values don’t only influence what is published, but also how it is presented, affecting public understanding.

== See also ==
- Afghanistanism
- Agenda-setting theory
- News bias
- Mass media impact on spatial perception
- Media imperialism
- Media transparency
- Reporting bias
- Systemic bias
- The Media Equation
