= Gudge =

Gudge may refer to:

- Guz, an Asian unit of measure
- Gur cake, an Irish pastry confection
