= Media bias =

Bias within the mass media

Media bias occurs when journalists and news producers present factual bias in how they report and convey news, current events, dialogue, or opinions. The term "media bias" implies a pervasive or widespread bias contravening of the standards of journalism, rather than the perspective of an individual journalist or article. The direction and degree of media bias in various markets (i.e, countries) is widely disputed.

Practical limitations to media neutrality include the inability of journalists to report all available stories and facts, and the requirement that selected facts be linked into a coherent narrative. Government influence, including overt and censorship, biases the media in some media markets such as countries. Politics and media bias may interact with each other; the media has the ability to influence politicians, and politicians may have the power to influence the media. This can change the distribution of power in society. Market forces may also cause bias. Examples include bias introduced by the ownership of media, including a concentration of media ownership, the subjective selection of staff, or the perceived preferences of an intended audience. Further some press bodies may mass-produce journalist content for syndication via multiple entities without each entity conducting further verification and research independently leading to the entire membership producing information that is mirrored with no further analysis, probing or confirmation. The impact of media bias is observed across social, political, and economic contexts. Media bias can influence public opinion by shaping how information is presented, including the framing of issues, selection of topics, and emphasis on particular viewpoints. This may affect how audiences interpret and form attitudes toward political actors, policies, and social groups.

Assessing possible bias is one aspect of media literacy, which is studied at schools of journalism, university departments (including media studies, cultural studies, and peace studies). Other focuses beyond political bias include international differences in reporting, as well as bias in reporting of particular issues such as economic class or environmental interests. Academic findings around bias can also differ significantly from public discourse and understanding of the term.

== Types ==
In The Oxford Handbook of Political Communication (2017), S. Robert Lichter described how in academic circles, media bias is more of a hypothesis to explain various patterns in news coverage than any fully-elaborated theory, and that a variety of potentially overlapping types of bias have been proposed that remain widely debated. Various proposed hypotheses of media bias have included:

- Advertising bias, when stories are selected or slanted to please advertisers.
- Anti-science bias, when stories promote superstition or other non-scientific ideas. Medical and scientific studies with lower hierarchy of evidence were found to have higher media coverage.
- Big news bias, which occurs when the distribution of events is asymmetric, and can lead to bias if the news focus on large events. For example, when progress is characterized by many incremental improvements with few yet larger setbacks, the news may focus on the latter and draw a negative image of the world.
- Concision bias, a tendency to report views that can be summarized succinctly, crowding out more unconventional views that take time to explain.
- Content bias, differential treatment of the parties in political conflicts, where biased news presents only one side of the conflict.
- Corporate bias, when stories are selected or slanted to please corporate owners of media.
- Coverage bias, when media choose to report only negative news about one party or ideology.
- Decision-making bias, means that the motivation, frame of mind, or beliefs of the journalists will have an impact on their writing. It is generally pejorative.
- Demand-driven bias.
- Demographic bias, where factors such as gender, race, and social and economic status influence reporting and can be a factor in different coverage of various demographic groups.
- Distortion bias, when the fact or reality is distorted or fabricated in the news.
- Episodic framing of television, for example, can lead people to ascribe blame to individuals instead of society, in contrast to thematic framing that leads people to look more at societal causes.
- False balance and false equivalence occur when an issue is presented as having equally-compelling reasons on both sides, despite disproportionate amounts of evidence favoring one (also known as undue weight).
- False consensus bias, overestimating the degree to which public opinion or political leanings align with a particular media narrative or issue framing.
- False timeliness, implying that an event is a new event, and thus deriving notability, without addressing past events of the same kind.
- Gatekeeping bias (also known as selectivity or selection bias), when stories are selected or deselected, sometimes on ideological grounds (see spike). It is sometimes also referred to as agenda bias, when the focus is on political actors and whether they are covered based on their preferred policy issues.
- Mainstream bias, a tendency to report what everyone else is reporting, and to avoid stories that will offend anyone. This type of bias can result in the homogenization of information, diminishing diversity in media content and negatively impacting both media consumption and the overall user experience.
- Negativity bias (or bad news bias), a tendency to show negative events and portray politics as less of a debate on policy and more of a zero-sum struggle for power. Excessive criticism or negativity can lead to cynicism and disengagement from politics.
- Normalcy bias, a bias to represent the abnormal as ordinary.
- Partisan bias, a tendency to report to serve particular political party leaning.
- Sensationalism, bias in favor of the exceptional over the ordinary, giving the impression that rare events, such as airplane crashes, are more common than common events, such as automobile crashes. "Hierarchy of death" and "missing white woman syndrome" are examples of this phenomenon. This type of bias is most commonly seen in news headlines to attract attention.
- Speculative content, when stories focus not on what has occurred, but primarily on what might occur, using words like "could", "might", or "what if", without labeling the article as analysis or opinion.
- Statement bias (also known as tonality bias, or presentation bias), when media coverage is slanted towards or against particular actors or issues.
- Structural bias, when an actor or issue receives more or less favorable coverage as a result of newsworthiness and media routines, not as the result of ideological decisions. (e.g. incumbency bonus).
- Supply-driven bias
- Tuchman's Law suggests how people overestimate the risk from dangers that are disproportionately discussed in media.
- Ventriloquism, when experts or witnesses are quoted in a way that intentionally voices the author's own opinion.
- Conflict framing is used more and more in modern media, where news is made to bring out the personal biases of the receiving audience.

In 2023, an unpublished research project named "The Media Bias Taxonomy" is attempting to assess the various definitions and meanings of media bias. While still ongoing, it attempts to summarize the domain as the distinct subcategories linguistic bias (encompassing linguistic intergroup bias, framing bias, epistemological bias, bias by semantic properties, and connotation bias), text-level context bias (featuring statement bias, phrasing bias, and spin bias), reporting-level context bias (highlighting selection bias, coverage bias, and proximity bias), cognitive biases (such as selective exposure and partisan bias), and related concepts like framing effects, hate speech, sentiment analysis, and group biases (encompassing gender bias, racial bias, and religion bias). The authors emphasize the complex nature of detecting and mitigating bias across different media content and contexts.

== History ==
John Milton's 1644 pamphlet Areopagitica, a Speech for the Liberty of Unlicensed Printing was one of the first publications advocating freedom of the press. In the 19th century, journalists began to recognize the concept of unbiased reporting as an integral part of journalistic ethics. This coincided with the rise of journalism as a powerful social force. Even today, the most conscientiously objective journalists cannot avoid accusations of bias.

Like newspapers, the broadcast media (radio and television) have been used as a mechanism for propaganda from their earliest days, a tendency made more pronounced by the initial ownership of broadcast spectrum by national governments. Although a process of media deregulation has placed the majority of the western broadcast media in private hands, there still exists a strong government presence, or even monopoly, in the broadcast media of many countries across the globe. At the same time, the concentration of media ownership in private hands, and frequently amongst a comparatively small number of individuals, has also led to accusations of media bias. Bias has been accused of being a political tool, especially in the United States:

- In the U.S., in 1798, Congress passed the Alien and Sedition Acts, which prohibited newspapers from publishing "false, scandalous, or malicious writing" against the government, including any public opposition to any law or presidential act. This act was in effect until 1801.
- During the American Civil War, President Abraham Lincoln accused newspapers in the border states of bias in favor of the Southern cause, and ordered many newspapers closed.
- Antisemitic politicians who favored the United States entering World War II on the Nazi side asserted that the international media were controlled by Jews, and that reports of German mistreatment of Jews were biased and without foundation. Hollywood was accused of Jewish bias, and films such as Charlie Chaplin's The Great Dictator were offered as alleged proof.
- In the U.S., during the labor union movement and the civil rights movement, newspapers supporting liberal social reform were accused by conservative newspapers of communist bias. Film and television media were accused of bias in favor of mixing of the races, and many television programs with racially mixed casts, such as I Spy and Star Trek, were not aired on Southern stations.
- During the war between the United States and North Vietnam, Vice President Spiro Agnew accused newspapers of anti-American bias, and in a famous speech delivered in San Diego in 1970, called anti-war protesters "the nattering nabobs of negativism."

Not all accusations of bias are political. Science writer Martin Gardner has accused the entertainment media of anti-science bias. He claimed that television programs such as The X-Files promote superstition. In contrast, the Competitive Enterprise Institute, which is funded by businesses, accuses the media of being biased in favor of science and against business interests, and of credulously reporting science that shows that greenhouse gasses cause global warming.

== Structural (non-ideological) biases ==
While most accusations of bias tend to revolve around ideological disagreements, other forms of bias are cast as structural in nature. There is little agreement on how they operate or originate but some involve economics, government policies, norms, and the individual creating the news. Some examples, according to Cline (2009) include commercial bias, temporal bias, visual bias, bad news bias, narrative bias, status quo bias, fairness bias, expediency bias, class bias and glory bias (or the tendency to glorify the reporter). There is also a growing economics literature on mass media bias, both on the theoretical and the empirical side. On the theoretical side the focus is on understanding to what extent the political positioning of mass media outlets is mainly driven by demand or supply factors. This literature was surveyed by Andrea Prat of Columbia University and David Stromberg of Stockholm University in 2013.

=== Supply-driven bias ===
When an organization prefers consumers to take particular actions, this would be supply-driven bias. Implications of supply-driven bias:

- Supply-side incentives are able to control and affect consumers. Strong persuasive incentives can even be more powerful than profit motivation.
- Competition leads to decreased bias and hinders the impact of persuasive incentives. And it tends to make the results more responsive to consumer demand.
- Competition can improve consumer treatment, but it may affect the total surplus due to the ideological payoff of the owners.

An example of supply-driven bias is Zinman and Zitzewitz's study of snowfall reporting. Ski attractions tend to be biased in snowfall reporting, reporting higher snowfall than official forecasts. David Baron suggests a game-theoretic model of mass media behaviour in which, given that the pool of journalists systematically leans towards the left or the right, mass media outlets maximise their profits by providing content that is biased in the same direction as their employees. Herman and Chomsky (1988) cite supply-driven bias including around the use of official sources, funding from advertising, efforts to discredit independent media ("flak"), and "anti-communist" ideology, resulting in news in favor of U.S. corporate interests.

=== Demand-driven bias ===
Demand from media consumer for a particular type of bias is known as demand-driven bias. Consumers tend to favor a biased media based on their preferences, an example of confirmation bias. There are three major factors that make this choice for consumers:

- Delegation, which takes a filtering approach to bias.
- Psychological utility, "consumers get direct utility from news whose bias matches their own prior beliefs."
- Reputation, consumers will make choices based on their prior beliefs and the reputation of the media companies.

Demand-side incentives are often not related to distortion. Competition can still affect the welfare and treatment of consumers, but it is not very effective in changing bias compared to the supply side. In demand-driven bias, preferences and attitudes of readers can be monitored on social media, and mass media write news that caters to readers based on them. Mass media skew news driven by viewership and profits, leading to the media bias. And readers are also easily attracted to lurid news, although they may be biased and not true enough. Dong, Ren, and Nickerson investigated Chinese stock-related news and weibos in 20132014 from Sina Weibo and Sina Finance (4.27 million pieces of news and 43.17 million weibos) and found that news that aligns with Weibo users' beliefs are more likely to attract readers. Also, the information in biased reports also influences the decision-making of the readers.

In Raymond and Taylor's test of weather forecast bias, they investigated weather reports of the New York Times during the games of the baseball team the Giants from 1890 to 1899. Their findings suggest that the New York Times produce biased weather forecast results depending on the region in which the Giants play. When they played at home in Manhattan, reports of sunny days predicting increased. From this study, Raymond and Taylor found that bias pattern in New York Times weather forecasts was consistent with demand-driven bias.

Sendhil Mullainathan and Andrei Shleifer of Harvard University constructed a behavioural model in 2005, which is built around the assumption that readers and viewers hold beliefs that they would like to see confirmed by news providers, which they argue the market then provides. Demand-driven models evaluate to what extent media bias stems from companies providing consumers what they want. Stromberg posits that because wealthier viewers result in more advertising revenue, the media as a result ends up targeted to whiter and more conservative consumers while wealthier urban markets may be more liberal and produce an opposite effect in newspapers in particular.

=== Social media ===
Perceptions of media bias may also be related to the rise of social media. The rise of social media has undermined the economic model of traditional media. The number of people who rely upon social media has increased and the number who rely on print news has decreased. Studies of social media and disinformation suggest that the political economy of social media platforms has led to a commodification of information on social media. Messages are prioritized and rewarded based on their virality and shareability rather than their truth, promoting radical, shocking click-bait content. Social media influences people in part because of psychological tendencies to accept incoming information, to take feelings as evidence of truth, and to not check assertions against facts and memories.

Media bias in social media is reflected in hostile media effect. Social media has a place in disseminating news in modern society, where viewers are exposed to other people's comments while reading news articles. In their 2020 study, Gearhart and her team showed that viewers' perceptions of bias increased and perceptions of credibility decreased after seeing comments with which they held different opinions. Within the United States, Pew Research Center reported that 64% of Americans believed that social media had a toxic effect on U.S. society and culture in July 2020. Only 10% of Americans believed that it had a positive effect on society. Some of the main concerns with social media lie with the spread of deliberately false information and the spread of hate and extremism. Social scientist experts explain the growth of misinformation and hate as a result of the increase in echo chambers.

Fueled by confirmation bias, online echo chambers allow users to be steeped within their own ideology. Because social media is tailored to your interests and your selected friends, it is an easy outlet for political echo chambers. Another Pew Research poll in 2019 showed that 28% of U.S. adults "often" find their news through social media, and 55% of U.S. adults get their news from social media either "often" or "sometimes". Additionally, more people are reported as going to social media for their news as the COVID-19 pandemic has restricted politicians to online campaigns and social media live streams. GCF Global encourages online users to avoid echo chambers by interacting with different people and perspectives along with avoiding the temptation of confirmation bias.

Yu-Ru and Wen-Ting's research looks into how liberals and conservatives conduct themselves on Twitter after three mass shooting events. Although they would both show negative emotions towards the incidents they differed in the narratives they were pushing. Both sides would often contrast in what the root cause was along with who is deemed the victims, heroes, and villain/s. There was also a decrease in any conversation that was considered proactive. Media scholar Siva Vaidhyanathan, in his book Anti-Social Media: How Facebook Disconnects Us and Undermines Democracy (2018), argues that on social media networks, the most emotionally charged and polarizing topics usually predominate, and that "If you wanted to build a machine that would distribute propaganda to millions of people, distract them from important issues, energize hatred and bigotry, erode social trust, undermine journalism, foster doubts about science, and engage in massive surveillance all at once, you would make something a lot like Facebook."

Social media plays a substantial role in contemporary news consumption, serving as a primary news source for younger generations. The format of social media content—which tends to be shorter and more visually oriented than traditional articles—has expanded opportunities for audience engagement and global reach. However, the shift toward platform-based news distribution has amplified concerns surrounding media bias, as algorithmic curation and filter bubbles can facilitate the spread of misinformation and present new ethical challenges for news dissemination.

In a 2021 report, researchers at the New York University's Stern Center for Business and Human Rights found that Republicans' frequent argument that social media companies like Facebook and Twitter have an "anti-conservative" bias is false and lacks any reliable evidence supporting it; the report found that right-wing voices are in fact dominant on social media and that the claim that these platforms have an anti-conservative lean "is itself a form of disinformation."

A 2021 study in Nature Communications examined political bias on social media by assessing the degree to which Twitter users were exposed to content on the left and right – specifically, exposure on the home timeline (the "news feed"). The study found that conservative Twitter accounts are exposed to content on the right, whereas liberal accounts are exposed to moderate content, shifting those users' experiences toward the political center. The study determined: "Both in terms of information to which they are exposed and content they produce, drifters initialized with Right-leaning sources stay on the conservative side of the political spectrum. Those initialized with Left-leaning sources, on the other hand, tend to drift toward the political center: they are exposed to more conservative content and even start spreading it." These findings held true for both hashtags and links. The study also found that conservative accounts are exposed to substantially more low-credibility content than other accounts.

A 2022 study in PNAS, using a long-running massive-scale randomized experiment, found that the political right enjoys higher algorithmic amplification than the political left in six out of seven countries studied. In the US, algorithmic amplification favored right-leaning news sources. Media bias is also reflected in search systems in social media. Kulshrestha and her team found through research in 2018 that the top-ranked results returned by these search engines can influence users' perceptions when they conduct searches for events or people, which is particularly reflected in political bias and polarizing topics.

=== Language ===
Tanya Pamplone warns that since much of international journalism takes place in English, there can be instances where stories and journalists from countries where English is not taught have difficulty entering the global conversation. Language may also introduce a more subtle form of bias. The selection of metaphors and analogies, or the inclusion of personal information in one situation but not another can introduce bias, such as a gender bias. Media framing is the way news stories are constructed to evoke a particular interpretation or reaction from the audience. During language conversions, the translator, which could be something like a news outlet, can mold a story into something that it is not, and the people receiving the news would not be able to identify the media bias, because they cannot read the original story.

== Religion ==
The Satanic panic, a moral panic and episode of national hysteria that emerged in the U.S. in the 1980s (and thereafter to Canada, Britain, and Australia), was reinforced by tabloid media and infotainment. Scholar Sarah Hughes, in a study published in 2016, argued that the panic "both reflected and shaped a cultural climate dominated by the overlapping worldviews of politically active conservatives" whose ideology "was incorporated into the panic and reinforced through" tabloid media, sensationalist television and magazine reporting, and local news. Although the panic dissipated in the 1990s after it was discredited by journalists and the courts, Hughes argues that the panic has had an enduring influence in American culture and politics even decades later. In 2012, Huffington Post columnist Jacques Berlinerblau argued that secularism has often been misinterpreted in the media as another word for atheism.

According to Stuart A. Wright in 1997, there are six factors that contribute to media bias against minority religions: first, the knowledge and familiarity of journalists with the subject matter; second, the degree of cultural accommodation of the targeted religious group; third, limited economic resources available to journalists; fourth, time constraints; fifth, sources of information used by journalists; and finally, the front-end/back-end disproportionality of reporting. According to Yale Law professor Stephen Carter, "it has long been the American habit to be more suspicious of – and more repressive toward – religions that stand outside the mainline Protestant-Roman Catholic-Jewish troika that dominates America's spiritual life." As for front-end/back-end disproportionality, Wright says: "news stories on unpopular or marginal religions frequently are predicated on unsubstantiated allegations or government actions based on faulty or weak evidence occurring at the front-end of an event. As the charges weighed in against material evidence, these cases often disintegrate. Yet rarely is there equal space and attention in the mass media given to the resolution or outcome of the incident. If the accused are innocent, often the public is not made aware."

== Politics ==
Academic studies tend not to confirm a popular media narrative of liberal journalists producing a left-leaning media bias in the U.S., though some studies suggest economic incentives may have that effect. Since the 1960s, conservatives and libertarians in the U.S. have accused mainstream media outlets of exhibiting an anti-Republican bias in their reporting. Studies reviewed by S. Robert Lichter in 2018 generally found the media to be a conservative force in politics. Political bias in media can be evaluated relative to the median voter and can vary by topic. Various nations have been outlined as examples for strong influence on the presentation or censoring of information including: China, North Korea, Syria and Myanmar. Media tends to oversimplify parliamentary procedures, such as cloture.

Selective or biased coverage of protests depending on the political message or race of protestors was found in some cases, contributing to the protest paradigm.

== Economy ==
A study found media can overfocus on economics aggregates such as the gross domestic product and underreport economic news relevant to the middle of the income distribution such as median income and wage growth.

== Impacts of bias ==
Critics of media bias tend to point out how a particular bias benefits existing power structures, undermines democratic outcomes and fails to inform people with the information they need to make decisions around public policy. Experiments have shown that media bias affects behavior and more specifically influences the readership's political ideology. A study found higher politicization rates with increased exposure to the Fox News channel, while a 2009 study found a weakly-linked decrease in support for the Bush administration when given a free subscription to the right-leaning The Washington Times or left-leaning The Washington Post.

== Perception and trust in media ==
Trust in International News Providers
Survey of 19,899 adults in 18 countries
in 2025 (7 Jan–4 Feb) and similar in 2021

2021 2025

Perceptions of media bias and trust in the media have changed significantly from 1985-2011 in the US. Pew studies reported that the percentage of Americans who trusted that news media "get their facts straight" dropped from 55% in 1985, to 25% in 2011. Similarly, the percentage of Americans who trusted that news organizations would deal fairly with all sides when dealing with political and social issues dropped from 34% in 1985 to 16% in 2011. By 2011 almost two-thirds of respondents considered news organizations to be "politically biased in their reporting", up from 45% in 1985. Similar decreases in trust have been reported by Gallup, with In 2022, half of Americans responded that they believed that news organizations would deliberately attempt to mislead them.

However, since the early 1980s, studies have found the hostile media effect largely contributes to people's perceived bias in new coverage. Studies on the hostile media effect find that perceived news bias tends to be a result of the audience's bias rather than actual news slant, and the more knowledgeable or opinionated a person is on a topic, the more likely they are to perceive neutral coverage as bias.

Jonathan M. Ladd (2012), who has conducted intensive studies of media trust and media bias, concluded that the primary cause of belief in media bias is telling people that particular media are biased. People who are told that a medium is biased tend to believe that it is biased, and this belief is unrelated to whether that medium is actually biased or not. The only other factor with as strong an influence on belief that media is biased, he found, was extensive coverage of celebrities. A majority of people see such media as biased, while at the same time preferring media with extensive coverage of celebrities. Media bias can also contribute to the decline of trust in news organizations over time. When audiences repeatedly encounter information that appears biased or misleading, they may become more skeptical of all media sources. This growing skepticism can lead individuals to rely more on sources that align with their existing beliefs, further reinforcing polarization.

== Efforts to correct bias ==
NPR's ombudsman wrote a 2011 article about how to note the political leanings of think tanks or other groups that the average listener might not know much about before citing a study or statistic from an organization.

=== Algorithms ===
Polis (or Pol.is) is a social media website that allows people to share their opinions and ideas while elevating ideas that have more consensus. By September 2020, it had helped to form the core of dozens of pieces of legislation passed in Taiwan. Proponents had sought out a way to inform the government with the opinions of citizens between elections while also providing an online outlet for citizens that was less divisive and more informative than social media and other large websites. Attempts have also been made to utilize machine-learning to analyze the bias of text. For example, person-oriented framing analysis attempts to identify frames, i.e., "perspectives", in news coverage on a topic by determining how each person mentioned in the topic's coverage is portrayed. Another approach, matrix-based news aggregation, can help to reveal differences in media coverage between different countries.

=== Giving time to both sides ===
A technique used to avoid bias is the "point/counterpoint" or "round table", an adversarial format in which representatives of opposing views comment on an issue. This approach theoretically allows diverse views to appear in the media. However, the person organizing the report still has the responsibility to choose reporters or journalists that represent a diverse or balanced set of opinions, to ask them non-prejudicial questions, and to edit or arbitrate their comments fairly. When done carelessly, a point/counterpoint can be as unfair as a simple biased report, by suggesting that the "losing" side lost on its merits. Besides these challenges, exposing news consumers to differing viewpoints seems to be beneficial for a balanced understanding and more critical assessment of current events and latent topics. Using this format can also lead to accusations that the reporter has created a misleading appearance that viewpoints have equal validity (sometimes called "false balance"). This may happen when a taboo exists around one of the viewpoints, or when one of the representatives habitually makes claims that are easily shown to be inaccurate.

The CBC and Radio Canada, its French language counterpart, are governed by the 1991 Broadcasting Act, which states programming should be "varied and comprehensive, providing balance of information...provide a reasonable opportunity for the public to be exposed to the expression of differing views on matters of public concern."

== See also ==
- Agenda-setting theory – Ability of the mass media to influence the public agenda of a society
- Attention inequality – Term used to explain attention distribution across social media
- Doublespeak – Language that deliberately disguises, distorts, or reverses the meaning of words
- Freedom of speech by country
- Hostile media effect – Perception of balanced news coverage as biased
- Journalistic interventionism – Journalists promoting their own values
- Mass media impact on spatial perception
- Media bias in the United States – Media favoring certain ideologies
- Media imperialism – Area in the international political economy of communications
- Media transparency – Aspect of journalism and communications
- Political correctness – Measures to avoid offense or disadvantage
- Politico-media complex – Media's relationship with the ruling class
- Retractions and corrections – Notice of a mistake that appeared in a past issue of a newspaper
- Self-censorship – Act of censoring or classifying one's own discourse
- Structural pluralism
- Suggestive question – Linguistic expression
- Trial by media – Perception of one's guilt or innocence via coverage
- View from nowhere – Principle in journalism
