= Capitalist republic =

A capitalist republic (Note: Also historically known as a bourgeois republic) is a republican form of government operating in the interest of capital and private property, typically under a capitalist market-based economic system. This system combines elements of republican political theory, such as rule of law, with an economic system characterized by private ownership of the means of production, wage labour, and production for profit.

States commonly described as capitalist republics include the United States, France, and Germany, which combine republican constitutional structures with privately owned market economies.

In On New Democracy, China distinguished its vision of a New Democratic Republic from a capitalist republic, saying parliamentarianism as just an instrument to promote the dictatorship of the bourgeoisie or of the elite, land-owning class through manufacturing consent. Every colonial or semi-colonial country would have its own unique path to democracy, given that particular country's own social and material conditions. Mao spoke about how he wanted to create a new democracy, free from the feudal, semi-feudal, wage slavery, and imperialism. This New Democracy would be the dominant political system of a post-capitalist world.

== Irish ==
A capitalist republic was the goal of Sean Murray in the Irish Republicanism movement in the 1930s. At a meeting in Rathmines, Murray advocated a capitalist republic for Ireland, taking what commentators have described as a "stages" approach in moving from national freedom towards a socialist state. Murray advocated first the achievement of national freedom, to form a capitalist republic, followed by a transition from a capitalist republic to a socialist republic.

Other Republicans, such as Gilmore and O'Donnell, sought the same goal by reversing the stages, arguing that the uprooting of capitalism through struggle will consequently lead to national independence. Mike Milotte has noted that although Murray advocated a capitalist republic, "by avoiding the prefix its precise class nature was obscured".

== See also ==
- State capitalism
- Workers' republic
