= Lucilita Bhreatnach =

Northern Irish politician

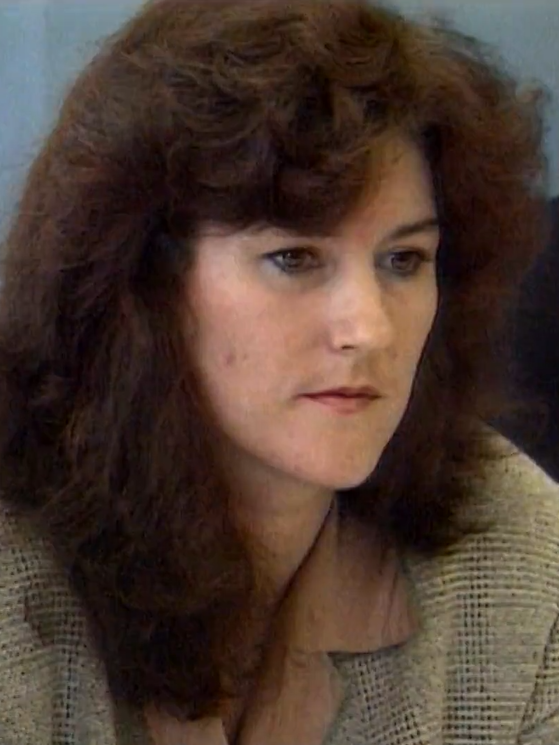
- Bhreatnach in 1994

Northern Ireland Forum Member
- In office 30 May 1996 – 25 April 1998
- Preceded by: New forum
- Succeeded by: Forum dissolved
- Constituency: Top-up list

Personal details
- Born: Dublin, Ireland
- Party: Sinn Féin

Lucilita Bhreatnach is an Irish republican politician. A member of Sinn Féin, Bhreatnach was a Member of the Northern Ireland Forum from 1996 to 1998.

== Political career ==
Growing up in Dublin, Bhreatnach joined Sinn Féin at the age of sixteen. She was chair and secretary of Comhaltas Ceoltóirí Éireann local group Dúchas. As a teenager she co-organised Irish language youth groups Ógras where she grew up and taught Irish and was a member of Conradh na Gaeilge (Gaelic League) the Women's Section of the Irish Anti-Apartheid Movement and the Irish Council for Civil Liberties. She was subsequently active in the Anti H-Block campaign, becoming the Chair of the National Stop the Strip-Searching Campaign. She is the daughter of the journalist, the late Deasún Breatnach and Lucy Bhreatnach member of Amnesty International and Irish Council of Civil Liberties. She worked for the Sinn Féin newspaper An Phoblacht in 1982, then on the International Department in the party's Foreign Affairs Bureau. In a part-time job she co organised a Union for part-time 'night-time cleaning workers' at St. Vincent's University Hospital, Elm Park, Dublin.

In 1986, Bhreatnach was elected to the party's Ard Chomhairle from the Ardfheis (National party conference), and in 1988, she became its General Secretary and brought the Sinn Féin Irish republican party through transitional changes.

At the 1994 European Parliament election, Bhreatnach stood in Leinster, but took only 2.5% of the votes cast and lost her deposit. At the Northern Ireland Forum election in 1996, Bhreatnach did not stand in a constituency, but was elected as she was placed first on Sinn Féin's "top-up" list.

Bhreatnach was part of the Sinn Féin delegation in talks with the British and Irish governments, political parties, business, trade union and civic society representatives. She was a Sinn Féin representative to the Forum for Peace and Reconciliation. She was a member of the Sinn Féin delegation to talks at Downing Street in 1998, with the Irish government in Government Buildings and in Castle Buildings in the lead-up to the Good Friday Agreement.

From 1999 until 2002, she was Director of the Electoral Department, opposing the Nice referendum, General election and planning for the 2001 UK general election.

She stood down as General Secretary in early 2003, moving to a new role, reorganising the party's Roinn an Chultúir and worked as head of its Equality Section, focusing on gender equality, 'Women in decision-making processes' creating new guidelines for election selection processes within Sinn Féin both to contest elections and within national and local party structures, organising training sessions for men and women on gender equality. In 2003, she organised a Sinn Féin conference, "Engine for Change — Women and Equality"

Bhreatnach then worked as a freelance journalist writing for the Irish language Lá newspaper. In December 2007, she was appointed to the all-Ireland Irish language body Foras na Gaeilge, and represented that body on the Audience Committee of RTÉ. and on sat on Foras na Gaeilge sub committees.

Bhreatnach was employed by the 'IDEAS Institute' with SIPTU private sector workers in Leinster as Regional Training Co-Ordinator designing Union Learning Representative courses, engaging with Union representatives in the workforce encouraging and organising upskilling courses and liaising with Companies Management and HR representatives to secure time off for many shift workers to up-skill. Many lost their jobs during the recession and courses were organised to aid the workers for new positions in the changing economic market. (2008-2010-SIPTU Trade Union Newspaper, Provincial media in Leinster).

Bhreatnach became a 'Uniting Ireland Co-Ordinator' in the Sinn Féin Party President's Department in the Oireachtas in Leinster House. Engaging with people within many sections in Irish society on the island of Ireland. Co-ordinating with teams to encourage local and national conversations on the benefits of Uniting Ireland for all of the people. Uniting Ireland conferences were held in Dublin's Rotunda Hospital, Cork's City Hall, in Galway during the Irish Presidential elections and in Derry city's millennium in which 1300 members of the public attended including a few hundred from the Unionist communities. (2011-2013-RTÉ News, An Phoblacht, Galway Advertiser, Irish Examiner, The Derry Journal, The Centinel and local radio stations i.e. Galway Bay, Cork FM).

== See also ==
- Breathnach

Party political offices
Preceded by Joe Reilly	General Secretary of Sinn Féin; 1988–2003	Succeeded by Mitchel McLaughlin
Northern Ireland Forum
New forum	Regional Member; 1996–1998	Forum dissolved
