= Hold Ye Front Page =

Book series published by The Sun

Hold Ye Front Page is a series of books published by the UK tabloid newspaper The Sun: Hold Ye Front Page (1999), Hold Ye Front Page II (2000), Giant Leaps (2006), and On Me 'Eadline (2007).

The first book, Hold Ye Front Page, was written by John Perry, Neil Roberts and Phil Leach of The Sun. It was a UK best-seller, published to commemorate the Millennium and documented the history of the last two millennia. The authors won a British Press Award in 2000, with the judges praising its educational content, wit and self-parody. Its sequel detailed history from the Big Bang to the Birth of Christ. Giant Leaps charted the history of science. On Me 'Eadline did the same with sport.

Education Secretary David Blunkett advocated the use of the book in classrooms, but the Times Educational Supplement questioned whether it would be suitable.

The paper also published a website with the same name. Roy Greenslade of The Guardian praised its "clever combination of popular journalism and academic rigour".
