= Cause of death =

Medical, legal, and statistical determination

In law, medicine, and statistics, cause of death is an official determination of the conditions resulting in a human's death, which may be recorded on a death certificate. A cause of death is determined by a medical examiner. In rare cases, an autopsy needs to be performed by a pathologist. The cause of death is a specific disease or injury, in contrast to the manner of death, which is a small number of categories like "natural", "accident", "suicide", and "homicide", each with different legal implications.

The standards for cause of death recording and reporting are set by WHO. All death certificates typically include a medical certificate of cause of death collecting information for disease prevention and health policy. The recommended international format for this certificate is established by the World Health Organization (WHO) and applies uniformly across member states. The World Health Organization's ICD-11 Reference Guide provides the authoritative specification for its design and completion. Extensive detail is also available in the format of a manual for medical certification. International Classification of Disease (ICD) codes are used to record manner and cause of death in a systematic way that makes it easy to compile statistics and more feasible to compare events across jurisdictions globally.

== Accuracy concerns ==
A study published in Preventing Chronic Disease found that only one-third of New York City resident physicians reported believing that the present system of documentation was accurate. Half reported the inability to record "what they felt to be the correct cause of death", citing reasons such as technical limitation and instruction to "put something else". Nearly four-fifths reported being unaware that determinations of "probable", "presumed", or "undetermined" could be made, and fewer than three percent reported ever updating a death certificate when conflicting lab results or other new information became available, and cardiovascular disease was indicated as "the most frequent diagnosis inaccurately reported".

Causes of death are sometimes disputed by relatives or members of the public, particularly when some degree of uncertainty or ambiguity exists in relation to the cause of death. On occasion, such disputes may result from, or sometimes instigate, a conspiracy theory.

Public perception of the relative risk of death by various causes is biased by personal experience and by media coverage. The phrase "hierarchy of death" is sometimes used to describe the factors that cause some deaths to get more attention than others.

Though some opponents of abortion consider it a cause of death, conventionally medical authorities do not confer personhood on fetuses that are not viable outside the womb, and thus abortions are not reported as deaths in these statistics.

== Aging ==
Health departments discourage listing "old age" as the cause of death because doing so does not benefit public health or medical research. Aging is not a scientifically recognized cause of death; it is currently considered that there is always a more direct cause (although it may be unknown in certain cases and could be one of a number of aging-associated diseases). As an indirect or non-determinative factor, biological aging is the biggest contributor to deaths worldwide. It is estimated that of the roughly 150,000 people who die each day across the globe, about two thirds—100,000 per day—die of age-related causes. In industrialized nations the proportion is much higher, reaching 90%. In recent years, there have been official claims about a possibility of recognizing aging itself as a disease. If this would be so, the situation would change.

== Emotional death ==
There are also popular notions that someone can be "scared to death" or die of loneliness or heartbreak. Experiencing fear, extreme stress, or both can cause changes in the body that can, in turn, lead to death. For example, it is possible that overstimulation of the vagus nerve—which decreases heart rate in a mechanism related to the behavior of apparent death (also known as "playing dead" and "playing possum")—is the cause of documented cases of psychogenic death. The flight or fight response to fear or stress has the opposite effect, increasing heart rate through stress hormones, and can cause cardiovascular problems (especially in those with pre-existing conditions). This is the proposed mechanism for the observed increase in the death rate due to cardiac arrest after widely experienced acutely stressful events such as terrorism, military attacks, and natural disasters (even among those who are not in the affected area) and for documented deaths in muggings and other frightening events which caused no traumatic physical harm. The proximal medical cause of death in these cases is likely to be recorded as cardiac failure or vagal inhibition (which also has other potential causes such as blows to certain parts of the body and nerve injuries).

One specific condition observed to result from acute stress, takotsubo cardiomyopathy, is nicknamed "broken heart syndrome", but the stress need not be relationship-related and need not be negative.

== See also ==
- Death by misadventure
- List of causes of death by rate
- List of preventable causes of death
- Manner of death
- Proximate and ultimate causation
