= Deasún Breatnach =

Irish journalist, author and activist

- Born: Francis Xavier Desmond Walsh; 2 December 1921; Rathmines, Dublin, Ireland
- Died: 3 October 2007 (aged 85); Dublin
- Spouse: Lucy Bhreatnach
- Children: Lucilita Bhreatnach

Deasún Breatnach (2 December 1921 – 3 October 2007) was an Irish journalist, author and activist. He wrote Irish poetry, non-fiction, fiction, and translations.

== Early life ==
Deasún Breatnach was born in Rathmines, Dublin, probably in Belgrave Square, on 2 December 1921. He was christened Francis Xavier Desmond Walsh, and was known as "Des". His parents were Gertrude (née Andrews) and Kevin Walsh, a solicitor. He was the eldest child, with two brothers and one sister. His paternal grandfather was also a solicitor and supporter of Charles Stewart Parnell, James J. Walsh, who represented two of the Invincibles found guilty of assassinating Lord Frederick Cavendish and Thomas Henry Burke. His father was a supporter of John Redmond, and served with the British army during World War I in France. Breatnach adopted the Irish form of his name as a young man, Deasún Breatnach. He attended Belvedere College, Dublin, until the death of his father in 1934, after which his mother could no longer afford the tuition and he became a boarder in Newbridge, County Kildare. Breatnach described his father as "his best friend".

== Early career ==
He was unable to attend university due to the family's financial situation, and when he left boarding school he joined the Local Defence Force. This force was incorporated in the army for the duration of the Emergency in Ireland during World War II, with Breatnach serving in the 18th Battalion. He rose to the rank of lieutenant, often the officer in charge at the Magazine Fort in the Phoenix Park. He started his writing career when he was asked to write for the defence forces newsletter, The Spearhead, with his first poem, "Adeste fidelis" published in The Irish Times in December 1944. While still serving in the army, he wrote an article defending Irish neutrality for the New York Herald Tribune under the pen name Rex Mac Gall. He wrote film reviews for the newspaper of Ailtirí na hAiséirghe, Aiséirighe, in 1945.

In May 1946, he flew to Spain, having purchased the ticket with his gratuity having left the army. He was employed by the Spanish Tourist Board and worked as a freelance journalist as well as working with American radio station in Tangier, Morocco. He met and married Maria de la Piedad Lucila Hellman de Menchaca on 31 July 1947. She took the name Lucy Bhreatnach. Her interest in politics and languages inspired Breatnach to deepen his commitment to the Irish language and heritage. Their first child was born in Spain. All their children, 5 sons and a daughter, were raised speaking both Spanish and Irish. In 1949, the family moved to Dublin, where they were part of a group which established the first gaelscoil, Irish language school, Scoil Lorcáin in Blackrock Town Hall. The school was not funded by the state, and was non-denominational. They were later involved in the foundation of a secondary gaelscoil, Coláiste Cualann, but this was not as successful.

== Later career ==
Breatnach wrote for The Irish Times, the Sunday Review, the Irish Independent and Scéala Éireann. He wrote about his experiences in Spain and the Arabic world, and from 1950 wrote regularly and gave radio talks about maritime matters. He continued to write under the name Rex Mac Gall (MacGall), but also under Dara Mac Dara and Mac Lir when writing about political topics. The other outlets he wrote for included the Irish Farmers' Journal, Inniu, Feasta, and An Timire. He went on to become the features editor with The Irish Press, and journalist and sub-editor with the Irish Independent.

He attended night classes in Irish at Trinity College Dublin (TCD) from 1958 to 1960, where he was taught by David Greene and Máirtín Ó Cadhain. He went on to write more in Irish than English, publishing 5 children's books. He became interested in the life of William Bedell, and wrote The best of the English: a short account of the life and work of the bishop of Kilmore, William Bedell (1971). In 1993 he was awarded an M.Litt. from TCD, with his thesis on "An Púca", later published as Chugat an Púca (1994). He wrote and translated poetry from Spanish, Italian and Latin, published in Dánta amadóra (1998). A number of his poems and Irish language stories have been included in the Irish school curriculum. Breatnach also composed music, including a work dedicated to those who died on Bloody Sunday, and "An Ghailseach" inspired by his wife.

He was an active, lifelong member of Conradh na Gaeilge, particularly in its social activities. He regularly visited the Aran Islands and Connemara to improve his Irish. He was an advocate for the use of Irish in all aspects of life, including from his motor insurance company, leading to a long running disagreement over the forms and documentation provided only in English. This led to him being prosecuted for not taxing his car due to the lack of Irish language certificates. Many Irish language organisations supported him, and after he was jailed for a number days in April 1966 in Mountjoy Prison, his fine was paid by a donor. He later paid the full tax due in arrears.

A lifelong republican, he was a member of the Wolfe Tone Society, which supported both traditional republicanism and socialism. He was a strong opponent of partition in Ireland. During the 50 anniversary of Easter Rising in 1966, he joined 12 fellow members of the Irish-language activist group Misneach on a hunger strike to highlight the failure of the Irish state to accomplish the goals of the 1916 proclamation. The group picketed the GPO, Liberty Hall and the new Garden of Remembrance, and their protest was covered by both national and international media. He wrote for the United Irishman throughout the 1960s, and from 1973 to 1974 was editor of An Phoblacht while Éamonn Mac Thomáis was imprisoned, and again from 1977 to 1979. From 1986, he wrote for the journal Saoirse. He was opposed to the Good Friday Agreement, which his daughter Lucilita was involved in negotiating.

Alongside his wife, Breatnach was an advocate for human rights globally, particularly opposed the authoritarian regimes in South America. Both of them supported their son, Osgur, throughout a long battle to exonerate him from a conviction relating a train robbery. He was a founding member of Irish Republican Socialist Party (IRSP). Breatnach was also involved with the Motor Neurone Disease Association and the Pipers' Club. He continued to write and compose music into his 70s.

== Death ==
Breatnach died 2 days after his wife, on the day of her funeral, 3 October 2007. his body was donated to medical science.

== Selected publications ==
=== Books ===
- The best of the English: a short account of the life and work of the bishop of Kilmore, William Bedell (1971)
- Chugat an Púca (1994)
- Galar na bhfocal agus scéalta eile (1999)
- Gríscíní saillte (2001)

=== Poetry ===
- Dánta amadóra (1998)

=== Children's books ===
- An fáinne Arabach (1960)
- An dealbh Spáinneach (1962)
- An buama deireanach (1962)
- An deachtóir (1963)
- An gasúr a chaill a ghoile (1984)

Media offices
Preceded by Éamonn MacThomáis	Editor of An Phoblacht; 1973–1974	Succeeded by Éamonn MacThomáis
Preceded by Gerry O'Hare	Editor of An Phoblacht; 1977–1979	Succeeded by Danny Morrison
