= Lucy Bhreatnach =

Basque-Irish language activist

- Born: Maria de la Piedad Lucila Hellman de Menchaca; 8 October 1924; Algorta, Bizkaia, Basque Country, Kingdom of Spain
- Died: 1 October 2007 (aged 82); Dublin, Ireland
- Spouse: Deasún Breatnach
- Children: Lucilita Bhreatnach

Lucy Bhreatnach (8 October 1924 – 1 October 2007) was a Basque-Irish language activist, and co-founder of the first gaelscoil in Ireland, Scoil Lorcáin.

== Life ==
Lucy Bhreatnach was born Maria de la Piedad Lucila Hellman de Menchaca on 8 October 1924 in Algorta, Bizkaia, in the Basque Country. Her parents were Lucila de Menchaca Dilis and Franz Heinrich Hellman, a German businessman. She had two brothers. The family fled Spain during the civil war, but returned later. She met Deasún Breatnach in Madrid, and they married on 31 July 1947, after which she was known as Lucy Bhreatnach.

Her interest in politics and languages inspired her husband to deepen his commitment to the Irish language and heritage. Their first child was born in Spain. All their children, 5 sons and a daughter, were raised speaking both Spanish and Irish. In 1949, the family moved to Dublin, where they were part of a group which established the first gaelscoil, Irish language school, Scoil Lorcáin in Blackrock Town Hall. The school was not funded by the state, and was non-denominational. They were later involved in the foundation of a secondary gaelscoil, Coláiste Cualann, but this was not as successful.

She was a painter and illustrator, illustrating a children's story. Bhreatnach was a prominent Irish figure, known for arguing with R. M. "Bertie" Smyllie, Brendan Behan and Brian O'Nolan, in the Pearl Bar in Fleet Street. She supported the Good Friday Agreement, which her daughter Lucilita was involved in negotiating.

Alongside her husband, Bhreatnach was an advocate for human rights globally, particularly opposed the authoritarian regimes in South America. She supported women's rights, and was a founding member of the local branch of Amnesty International in Dún Laoghaire. Both of them supported their son, Osgur, throughout a long battle to exonerate him from a conviction relating a train robbery. He was a founding member of Irish Republican Socialist Party (IRSP).

Bhreatnach died on 1 October 2007. Her husband died 2 days later, on the day of her funeral, 3 October 2007.
