= Political bias =

Bias towards a political side in supposedly-objective information

Political bias refers to the bias or manipulation of information to favor a particular political position, party, or candidate. Closely associated with media bias, it often describes how journalists, television programs, or news organisations portray political figures or policy issues.

At the individual level, political bias emerges from an inability or unwillingness to understand opposing viewpoints. Such bias in individuals may have by shaped by their personality traits and thinking styles; it remains unclear whether individuals with particular political orientations are more biased than those with other political views.

Political bias exists beyond the selective presentation or interpretation of viewpoints that favour a particular leader or party. It can also influence the information encountered and everyday interactions among individuals. The prevalence of political bias has a lasting impact with proven effects on voter behaviour and consequent political outcomes.

Recognising political bias involves acknowledging departures from the expectation of political neutrality and identifying how those departures contribute to biased communication and interpretation.

== Types ==
=== Concision bias ===
Concision bias refers to reporting a viewpoint using only the words necessary to explain it quickly, while spending little or no time on detailing unconventional, difficult-to-explain views. Although concision aims to increase communication by selectively focusing on important information and eliminating redundancy, in a political context, this can mean the omission of seemingly unnecessary details; depending on what information is deemed unnecessary, this can be an example of bias. Political opinions are often reduced to simplified partisan beliefs or frameworks, with other challenging information excluded from their presentation.

=== Coverage bias ===
Coverage bias occurs when political figures address topics and issues with differing levels of attention. This can make certain issues and ideas seem more prevalent, important, or necessary than they actually are. Coverage bias can influence how policies and the issues they address are presented, as well as how extensively those issues are covered by the media and politicians. Another term for this phenomenon is issue salience, referring to how the frequency and focus given to specific topics can affect how public perception of their importance. For instance, even when statistics indicate otherwise, the public may view immigration or crime as more urgent if a party repeatedly emphasizes these topics.

By shaping political agendas, this strategic focus can influence undecided voters while also to mobilising voters already committed to a specific party. When media organisations prioritize coverage of issues emphasised by powerful political figures, they can produce a feedback loop that highlights certain topics while excluding others. As partisan priorities are take precedence over thorough discussion, political discourse may become distorted, potentially influencing democratic decision-making.

=== Confirmation bias ===
Confirmation bias is a cognitive bias where in which individuals favour and seek out information that supports their pre-existing beliefs and opinions. When set in a political atmosphere, individuals with like-minded political beliefs will seek and affirm their opinions, discounting contradictory information.

A recent meta-analysis comparing levels of confirmation bias among liberals and conservatives in the United States found that both groups were approximately equally biased. These findings challenge the idea that any one side of the political spectrum is more biased than another, implying that cognitive biases are not exclusive to any one ideology but are rather a universal feature of human reasoning. This is significant as it demonstrates how difficult it can be to overcome ideological divisions and highlights the importance critical thinking and openness to alternative perspectives in political discussion. The study also demonstrates the effects of motivated thinking on political attitudes: rather than simply absorbing information, people often actively interpret information to support their pre-existing opinions. As people become more set in their viewpoints and less willing to consider opposing points of view, this process can add to the political polarisation seen in contemporary society.

=== False consensus bias ===
False consensus bias occurs when the individuals assume that their opinions, beliefs and values are more widely shared than they actually are. This bias also exists in group settings, where the collective group opinion is attributed to the wider population. This is the basis of the formation of political parties, which week to normalise their views across the wider population while giving little recognition to alternative viewpoints. According to research, such biases can cause political polarisation as people and groups solidify their opinions and begin seeing opposing views as less valid. Social media platforms can produce echo chambers where users are largely exposed to content supporting their pre-existing views, contributing to this polarisation and increasing the false consensus effect.

According to studies, people who are exposed to social media news feeds that are favourably biased tend to believe that there is more public support for their views than there actually is, which strengthens their beliefs and may even push them toward more extreme stances. In addition, the false consensus bias may influence political elites' assessments of public opinion, which can affect democratic processes. According to a study, political elites' judgments were shown to be 20 to 25 percentage points off. This suggests that these misconceptions can result in policies that do not fully reflect the electorate's genuine preferences, compromising democratic accountability and responsiveness.

=== Speculative content ===
Speculative bias occurs when stories focus on what can potentially occur with speculative phrasing such as "may", "what if", and "could" rather than focusing on the evidence of what has and/or definitely will occur. When a piece is not specifically labelled as an opinion and analysis article, it can lead to further speculative bias. This occurs in a political context, particularly when introducing policies, or addressing opposing policies. This bias allows parties to make their policies more appealing and appear to address issues more directly, by speculating positive and negative outcomes.

Without enough information, such speculation frequently presents stories in ways that provoke emotions or exaggerate the perceived importance or effectiveness of a proposed policy. This gradually decreases public confidence in journalism, particularly when predicted outcomes fail to materialize. Additionally, by emphasizing speculative scenarios over confirmed facts, speculative content might unintentionally be used as a platform for political propaganda or manipulation, influencing public opinion.

When algorithms on social media and news collection sites highlight speculative information because it is emotionally charged or dramatic and tends to generate higher engagement, this problem gets more complicated. Such stories, particularly when read by audiences who might not be able to distinguish between reporting and opinion, confuse journalism with speculation due to a lack of clear labeling and open sourcing.

=== Gatekeeping bias ===
Gatekeeping occurs through the use of ideological selection, deselection and/or omission of stories based on individualised opinions. This is similarly related to agenda bias, primarily when focusing on politicians and how they choose to cover and present preferred policy discussions and issues.

=== Partisan bias ===
A partisan bias exists in the media when reporters serve and create the leaning of a particular political party. When journalists intentionally or unintentionally show material in a way that prioritizes one political ideology or party over another, they are engaging in bias and affecting the public's perception of political events and individuals. Story selection, framing, tone, and the frequency of criticism or support of specific parties or people are all examples of partisan bias.

Fox News, for example, has a history of favoring Republican opinions while disparaging Democratic leaders, especially during election seasons. Furthermore, significant partisan bias in reporting was discovered by empirical research that examined over 800,000 news stories from major U.S. broadcasters. Other networks, such as ABC, CBS, and NBC, were shown to have a slight liberal bias, however, their slant varied according to the political administration in power, whereas Fox News showed a strong conservative bias.

According to a Gallup study in 2017, 62% of Americans thought that media favored one political party, with Republican majority stating that the media favors Democrats. This divide was reflected in the public's opinion.

== Political neutrality ==
Political neutrality is the counteraction to political bias, looking to ensure the ability of public servants to carry out any official duties impartially, regardless of their political beliefs. In areas like media coverage, legal and bureaucratic decisions and academic teachings, the need for taking corrective action against politically biased actions is the foundation of neutral enforcement. Research suggests that nonpartisanship is favoured over political bias, with Republicans, Independents, and Democrats preferring to get their news from politically neutral media.

Individuals' responses to political bias and motivations are challenged when the engagement of bias furthers and assists their political party or ideology. Calling out attempts to stay neutral can lead to stronger reactions, since people often see neutrality as the right way to handle political topics and issues. In the media aspect, trying to stay fair may not always be easy and can still lead to claims of bias if something seems one-sided. This is a result of different political groups competing, and the way messages are shared can either challenge other beliefs or make one side's views stronger.

== Political bias and framing ==
Political bias exists primarily through the concept of framing. Framing is the social construction of political or social issues in ways that emphasize certain aspects over others, often creating a positive or negative representation of events, individuals, or policies. In this context, political leaders and parties use framing to highlight specific problems while offering solutions that align with and promote political agendas. This makes their stance appear more favorable and their policies seem like the logical or necessary course of action.

The framing effect looks at situations in which people are only presented with options within two frames, one presented negatively and the other positively. The framing effect is increasingly significant in opinion polls designed to encourage specific organisations that are commissioned to poll. If reliable, credible and sufficient information is provided, this bias can be significantly reduced. Framing further looks at the impact of slanting in political campaigning and its potential impact on the distribution of political power where political bias is present. It is important to understand that framing is an omnipresent process used in analysis to discern connections between aspects of reality and to convey an interpretation of opinions that may not be entirely accurate.

== Evidence of political bias in search engines ==
Search results from search engines often shape opinions and perceptions of political issues and candidates. Search engines influence democracy because of the potential distrust of media, leading to increasing online searches for political information and understanding. Looking specifically at the United States, the Fairness Doctrine was introduced in 1949 to avoid political bias in all licensed broadcasting media. Within the context of polarising topics such as political bias, the top search results can play a significant role in shaping opinions.

Through the use of a bias quantification framework, bias can be measured within political bias by rank within the search system. It can further address the sources of bias through the input data and ranking system. Within the context of information queries, a ranking system determines the search results, which in the case of topics such as politics, can return politically biased search results. The bias presented in search results can directly result from either biased data that collaborates with the ranking system or because of the structure of the ranking system itself. The questionable nature of search results raises questions of the impact on users and to what degree the ranking system can impact political opinions and beliefs, which can directly translate into voter behaviour. That can also affirm or encourage biased data within Google search results.

Research has shown that users do not place exclusive trust in information provided by search engines, but studies have shown that individuals who are undecided politically are susceptible to manipulation by bias relative to political candidates and the light in which their policies and actions are presented and conveyed. In the quantification of political bias, both the input data for search results and the ranking system in which they are presented to the user encapsulate bias to varying degrees.

There is a distinctive political bias in social media where the algorithm that structures user content facilitates confirmation bias. This involves presenting political information dependent on common searches and users' focus, further re-affirming political bias and reducing exposure to politically neutral content.

Determining the difference between content and source bias is a significant focus of determining the role of political bias in search engines. This focus looks directly at the actual content of the information present and whether it is purposefully selective in the information presented, or rather, whether the source of information is projecting personalised opinions relative to their political opinions.

== Political bias in the media ==
Media bias highlights political bias in the reporting of political topics and the representation of politicians. Where a reporter sometimes emphasises particular points of view and conveys selected information to further their own political view, they may present biased information favouring their own political opinion or that of their readership. There are distinctive regulations which protect against the fabrication of information. The media may alter the representation of information to promote political positions. Media bias can change political opinions, which directly impact voter behaviour and decisions, because of the failed representation of information. This form of political bias has continuing impacts when used to change the opinions of others. Where media remains a powerful information source for political information, it can create political bias in the informational representation of political actors and policy issues.

Use of media to further political bias

An example of quantification of political bias in the media is a propaganda model, a concept introduced by Edward S. Herman and Noam Chomsky. It is a political economy model, looking at the "manufacturing" of political policies through the manipulation of mass media. This model further looked at the capital funding of media outlets and their ownership, which often relates to political ties.

A different quantification of political bias compares media positions relative to the median voter, where a 2015 study found that political bias varies by topic.

Political bias in the media is also discussed, showing how social leaders discuss political issues. To determine the presence of political bias, agenda determination is used. Agenda determination is designed to provide an understanding of the agenda behind the presentation of political issues and attempt to determine political bias that is present.

Within a 2002 study by Jim A. Kuypers: Press Bias and Politics: How the Media Frame Controversial Issues, he looks at the omission of left-leaning points of view from the mainstream print press. Kuypers determined that politicians would receive positive press coverage only when covering and delivering topics that aligned with press-supported beliefs. This meant the press was engaging in bias within the media through their coverage and selection/release of political information, which was challenging the neutral conveyance of political messages.

David Baron similarly presents a game-theoretic model of media behaviour, suggesting that mass media outlets only hire journalists whose writing is aligned with their political positions. This engages false consensus bias, as beliefs are determined to be common due to being surrounded by aligned views. This effectively heightens political bias within media representation of information, and creates false narratives about the nations' political climate.

== See also ==
- Fake news
- False equivalence
- Framing (social sciences)
- Freedom of speech by country
- Mainstream media
- Manufacturing Consent § Five filters of editorial bias
- Mass media impact on spatial perception
- Media in Alberta § Political bias
- Pink-slime journalism
- Political censorship
- Political correctness
- Schismogenesis
- Self-censorship
