= Éamonn Mac Thomáis =

Irish historian, writer and broadcaster (1927–2002)

- Éamonn Mac Thomáis
- Born: 13 January 1927; Rathmines, Dublin, Ireland
- Died: 16 August 2002 (aged 75); Dublin, Ireland
- Resting place: Glasnevin Cemetery Dublin, Ireland
- Occupations: Author, broadcaster, historian, lecturer
- Known for: Lecturer, historian, Irish republican

Éamonn Mac Thomáis (13 January 1927 – 16 August 2002) was an author, broadcaster, historian, Irish Republican, advocate of the Irish language and lecturer. He presented his own series on Dublin on RTÉ (Irish National Broadcaster) during the 1970s and was well known for guided tours and lectures of his beloved Dublin. He is buried in Dublin's Glasnevin Cemetery, next to Frank Ryan.

== Biography ==
Mac Thomáis came from a staunch Republican family. He was born Edward Patrick Thomas in the Dublin suburb of Rathmines. His father, a fire-brigade officer, died when Éamonn was five years old and his family moved to Goldenbridge, Inchicore. He left school at 13 to work as delivery boy for White Heather Laundry, learning Dublin neighbourhoods with great thoroughness. He said he found work to help his mother pay the rent. He later worked as a clerk, and was appointed credit controller for an engineering firm.

Mac Thomáis joined the Dublin Brigade of the Irish Republican Army as a young man and was active in the preparations for and prosecution of the 1956-62 border campaign. He was interned in Curragh Camp during the campaign and in December 1961 was sentenced to 4 months imprisonment under the Offences Against the State Act.

At the November 1959 Ardfheis he was elected to the Ardchomhairle of Sinn Féin, and edited and contributed to the Sinn Féin newspaper The United Irishman. He was a close friend of Tomás Mac Giolla, and was deeply affected by the 1970 split in Sinn Féin. Mac Thomáis took the Provisional side, opposing Mac Giolla.

He took over as editor of An Phoblacht in 1972. In July 1973, he was arrested and charged with IRA membership at the Special Criminal Court in Dublin. He refused to recognise the court but he gave a lengthy address from the dock. The following month he was sentenced to 15 months imprisonment. Within two months of completing his sentence he was again before the court on the same charge and received a 15-month sentence. Editors of six left-wing and Irish-language journals called for his release, as did a number of writers, and hundreds attended protest meetings - to no avail. He served his full sentence.

Tim Pat Coogan, editor of the Irish Press, claimed the charges against Mac Thomáis were politically motivated to a large degree as his activities were confined strictly to the newspaper An Phoblacht. Under Section 31 of the Broadcasting Act, due to his membership of Sinn Féin in the 1970s he was removed from his position in making some of the RTÉ historical programmes. As a historian he made numerous contributions to various historical publications such as the Dublin Historical Review.

From 1974 he wrote a number of books on old Dublin. They sold well and remained in print for over 20 years. He also started a number of walking tours of Dublin, which proved very popular. He died in 2002.

His son Shane, also a historian, ran similar walking tours and was resident historian at Glasnevin cemetery before his death in 2014.

== Bibliography ==
Mac Thomáis's books include:

- Me Jewel and Darlin' Dublin (Dublin: O'Brien Press; with Michael O'Brien, illustrator); ISBN 0862783895; ISBN 978-0862783891
- Gur Cake & Coal Blocks (Dublin: O'Brien Press, 1976); ISBN 9780905140070; ISBN 0905140087
- Down Dublin Streets (1916) (Dublin: Irish Book Bureau, 1965),
- The Labour and the Royal (Dublin: O'Brien Press, 1978)
- Janey Mack Me Shirt is Black (Dublin: O’Brien Press, 1982)
- Lady at the Gate (Dublin: J. Clarke, 1971)

A collection of his writings from the 1980s was also published with the support of his family in 2015:

- Three Shouts on a Hill (Dublin: Republican Publications, 2015)

== Television programmes ==
- Hands (RTÉ)
- Dublin: a Personal View, two six-part series, 1979; 1983 (RTÉ)

== Awards and honours ==
- Old Dublin Society Silver Medal (1988)
- Bank of Ireland Millennium Medal (1989)

Media offices
| Preceded by | Editor of United Irishman – | Succeeded by |
| Preceded by Coleman Moynihan | Editor of An Phoblacht; 1972–1973 | Succeeded by Deasún Breathnach |
| Preceded by Deasún Breathnach | Editor of An Phoblacht; 1974 | Succeeded by Gerry Danaher |
