= Dawn Doyle =

Irish activist

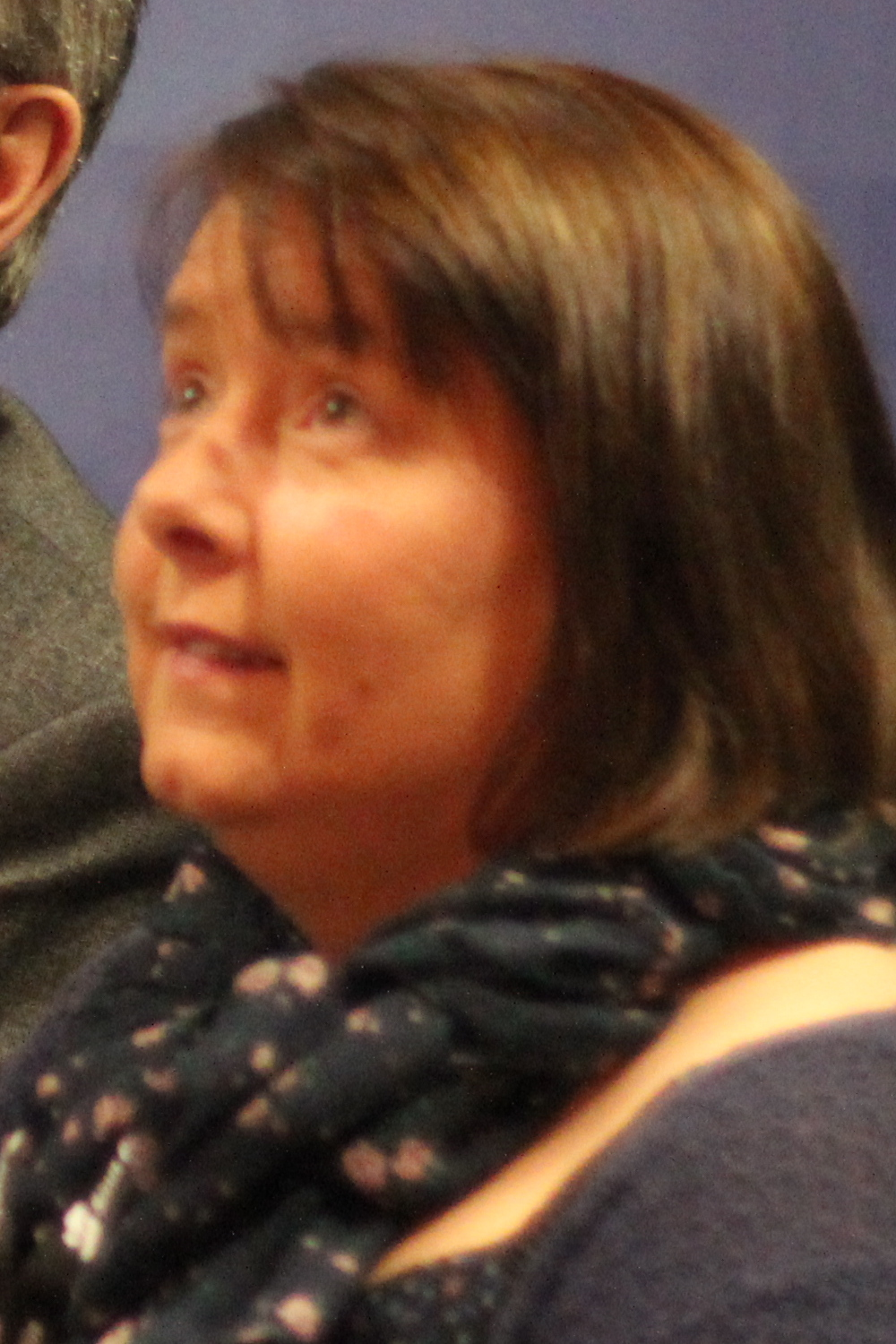
Doyle in 2014

Dawn Doyle is an Irish Sinn Féin activist.

Born in Wexford, Doyle worked in Sinn Féin's Press Office in Dublin for four years before becoming Sinn Féin's Director of Publicity, in 1998. She served in this post for almost ten years, before becoming 26 County Director of Political Operations in 2008. She served as General Secretary of the party from 2009 until 2020.

Party political offices
Preceded by Rita O'Hare	Sinn Féin Director of Publicity; 1998–2008	Succeeded by Rosaleen Doherty
Preceded by Rita O'Hare	General Secretary of Sinn Féin; 2009–2020	Succeeded by Ken O'Connell
