= Rita O'Hare =

IRA member and Sinn Féin politician (1943-2023)

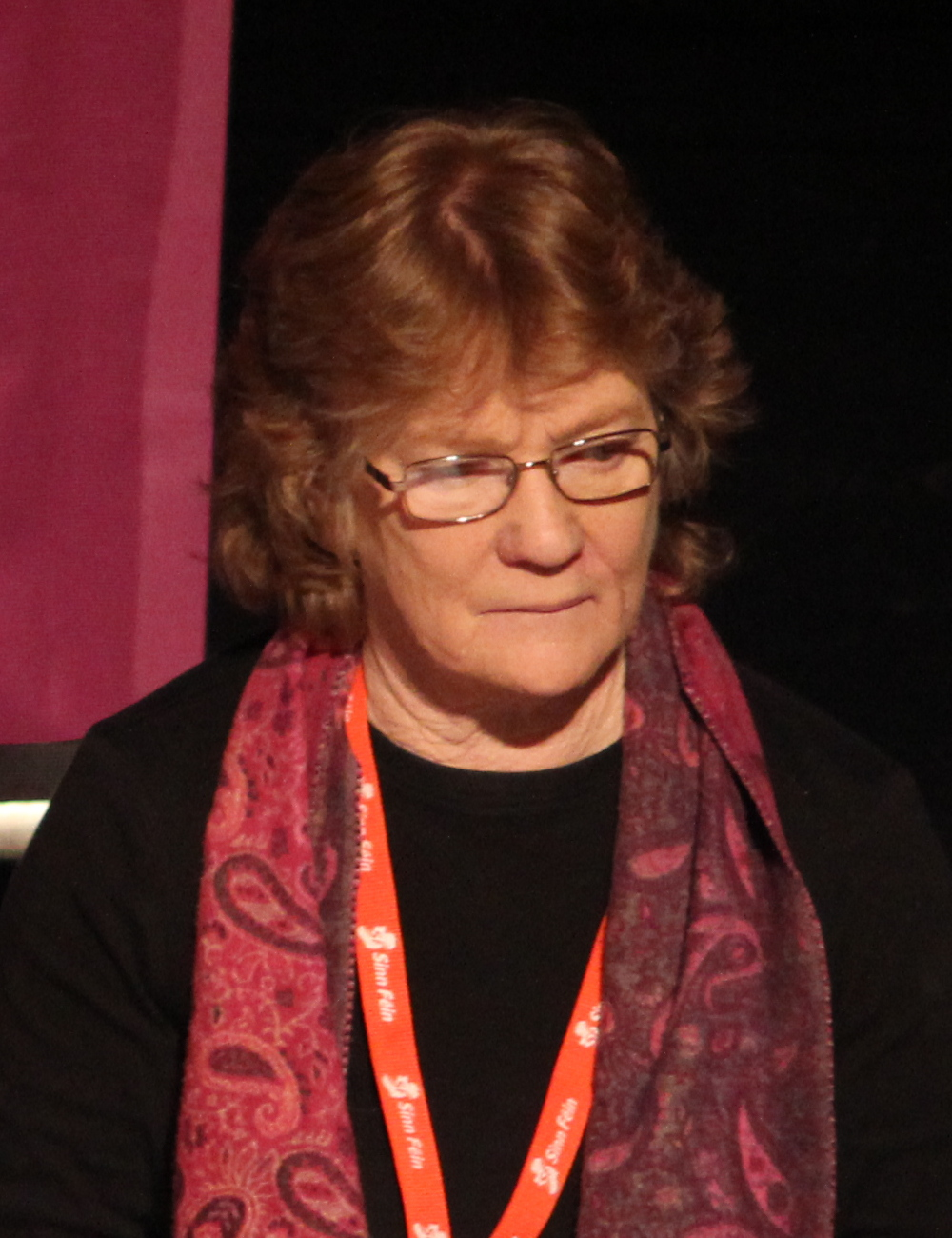
- O'Hare in 2014

Sinn Féin Representative to the United States
- In office 1998 – c. 2019

General Secretary of Sinn Féin
- In office 2007–2009
- Preceded by: Mitchel McLaughlin
- Succeeded by: Dawn Doyle

Director of Publicity of Sinn Féin
- In office 1990–1998
- Preceded by: Danny Morrison
- Succeeded by: Dawn Doyle

Editor of An Phoblacht
- In office 1985–1990
- Preceded by: Mick Timothy
- Succeeded by: Mícheál Mac Donncha

Personal details
- Born: Rita McCulloch; 13 January 1943 Belfast, Northern Ireland
- Died: 3 March 2023 (aged 80) Dublin, Ireland
- Resting place: Glasnevin Cemetery, Dublin
- Party: Sinn Féin
- Spouse: Gerry O'Hare (m. 1960; div. c. 1990s)
- Domestic partner: Brendan Brownlee
- Children: 4

Military service
- Branch/service: Provisional IRA
- Battles/wars: The Troubles

Rita O'Hare (née McCulloch; 13 January 1943 - 3 March 2023) was a Northern Irish republican activist and Sinn Féin politician who served as the party's general secretary and, for around two decades, as its representative to the United States. Born in Belfast to a Protestant father and a Catholic mother, she became involved in the civil rights movement of the late 1960s before joining the Provisional Irish Republican Army. In October 1971 she was shot and wounded by the British Army during a gun battle in Andersonstown, and the following year she was arrested and charged with the attempted murder of a British Army Warrant Officer. Released on bail, she fled to the Republic of Ireland in 1972 and remained a fugitive from Northern Ireland for the rest of her life, her extradition having been blocked by the Irish High Court on the grounds that the alleged offences fell within the political offence exception. She was later convicted of an explosives offence and served three years in Limerick Prison.

O'Hare went on to hold a series of senior positions within Sinn Féin, serving as editor of the party newspaper An Phoblacht from 1985 to 1990, director of publicity from 1990 to 1998, and general secretary from 2007 to 2009. From 1998 she was based in Washington, D.C. as the party's representative to the United States, a post she held for around two decades and in which she built extensive contacts on Capitol Hill and in the White House. She was widely credited with playing an important part in sustaining American political and financial support for the peace process, including through her role in the "on the runs" negotiations and in later efforts to prevent the return of a hard border to Ireland following Brexit.

O'Hare died at her home in Dublin on 3 March 2023, aged 80, following a long illness. She was given a republican funeral at Glasnevin Cemetery, where Sinn Féin president Mary Lou McDonald described her as "an unstoppable force for Irish freedom". Her death, and the attendance of senior Sinn Féin figures at her funeral, prompted criticism from DUP politicians, who noted that she had remained wanted in Northern Ireland in connection with the 1971 attempted murder charge until her death. A memoir, Rita, edited by Danny Morrison with a foreword by Gerry Adams, was published in 2024.

== Early life ==
She was born Rita McCulloch on 13 January 1943 in Belfast, the daughter of Billy McCulloch, (Note: Billy McCulloch is not to be confused with William McCullough, who was the general secretary of the Communist Party of Northern Ireland in the mid-20th century) a Protestant from East Belfast who worked in the linen mills and was a member of the Communist Party of Northern Ireland, and Maureen McCulloch, a Catholic from the nationalist Short Strand area. She later described her upbringing as relatively middle-class, and said she had been exposed to her father's left-wing, internationalist politics from a young age. She was educated at St Dominic's Grammar School on the Falls Road, and married Gerry O'Hare, a fellow Belfast republican, in 1960 at the age of 17. The couple had three children and later divorced, in the early 1990s. Her second partner was Brendan Brownlee, a republican from Belfast, with whom she had a fourth child.

== Civil rights activism and the Provisional IRA ==
In the late 1960s, O'Hare became involved in Northern Ireland's civil rights movement, later saying that unionism's violent response to peaceful protest convinced her that the campaign for civil rights alone would achieve little.

In February 1971, she was arrested while taking part in a protest outside the courts in Belfast city centre, an episode during which, according to one account, she wore a combat jacket and carried a hurling stick. She was sentenced to six months' imprisonment and held in Armagh Gaol. Following her release in August 1971, she joined the Provisional IRA; her husband Gerry was interned by the authorities that same month.

Weeks after her release, in October 1971, O'Hare was shot and wounded during an exchange of fire between republicans and the security forces in Andersonstown, sustaining a head wound. A British soldier, warrant officer Frazer Paton, was also wounded in the same incident. She was initially treated at the Royal Victoria Hospital before being transferred to the military wing of Musgrave Park Hospital, where a number of wounded soldiers, including Paton, were also patients, although the two never spoke.

O'Hare was arrested in 1972 and charged with Paton's attempted murder, as well as with malicious wounding and possession of firearms. She was released on bail and later recalled being threatened by British soldiers at a subsequent remand hearing. "I think I realised then that I could not stay in Belfast", she wrote in her 2024 memoir. She fled to Dublin in the Republic of Ireland, and she was subsequently unable to return to the United Kingdom because of the outstanding warrant. Sinn Féin later presented her case to the British government as one of the IRA "on the runs" (OTRs) under consideration to be allowed to return home to Northern Ireland.

Her husband Gerry was released from the Long Kesh internment camp in March 1973 and joined her in the Republic. He was arrested in Dundalk that August and sentenced to twelve months' imprisonment for IRA membership, a term extended by a further twelve months after he helped three senior IRA figures escape from Mountjoy Prison by hijacked helicopter in October 1973.

== Imprisonment in the Republic ==
In February 1975, O'Hare was arrested at her home in Dublin and charged with possession of explosives arising from an incident at Portlaoise Prison. She was tried without a jury and later described the charge against her as one of "possession of explosives at a time and place unknown". She was sentenced to three years' imprisonment, which she served in Limerick Prison, and was released in 1979, only to be immediately arrested again on an extradition warrant.

Her extradition to Northern Ireland was blocked when the Irish High Court ruled in March 1978 that O'Hare should not be extradited, on the grounds that the offences she was alleged to have committed fell within the political offence exception.

== Sinn Féin career ==
=== Editor of An Phoblacht and director of publicity ===
O'Hare was editor of the Irish republican newspaper An Phoblacht from 1985 to 1990, before becoming Sinn Féin's director of publicity in 1990. Her predecessor as editor was her former husband, Gerry O'Hare; some republicans have suggested that the breakdown of their marriage was connected to the party's decision to favour her over him for the editorship, though this account has been disputed by others who knew the couple.

While based in Dublin, O'Hare was temporarily refused entry to the United States after travelling to Florida for a meeting, since the terms of her special visa required her to notify the authorities in advance of such travel. In May 2005 she was again refused permission to travel to the United States, this time to accompany Martin McGuinness on a visit to New York and Washington. American officials said the refusal did not represent a change in policy towards Sinn Féin, but that her conviction on the Portlaoise explosives charge meant she had to apply for a waiver before each visit; she had travelled to the United States regularly in the six years before the refusal. That July, she nonetheless accompanied McGuinness to Washington to brief American officials, members of Congress and Irish-American groups on developments in the peace process.

=== Representative to the United States ===
O'Hare became close friends with Jean Kennedy Smith, who served as United States ambassador to Ireland from 1993 to 1998 and played a significant role in the peace process. After having to turn down an opportunity to speak at an event in New York in 1998 because she was "on the run", Kennedy Smith helped secure her a visa. She was subsequently asked by Gerry Adams to become Sinn Féin's representative in the United States for what was intended to be a two-year posting; the role lasted around two decades, during which O'Hare travelled extensively between Ireland, the United States and Canada, building an extensive network of contacts on Capitol Hill and in the White House. During her tenure, she was photographed with Nelson Mandela during a 1995 visit to South Africa, as well as with US presidents Barack Obama and Joe Biden later on.

=== General secretary and the "on the runs" ===
O'Hare served as Sinn Féin general secretary from 2007 to 2009, succeeding Mitchel McLaughlin and being succeeded by Dawn Doyle. She was among a number of senior republicans, including Bobby Sands' former election agent Owen Carron, whose case was raised as part of negotiations between the British government and republican leaders in 2003 over the status of IRA fugitives, or "on the runs", who sought to return to Northern Ireland under a scheme granting them freedom from prosecution. The proposals, opposed by unionists, would have seen fugitives face a form of judicial commission while avoiding a return to prison. More than 200 republicans eventually received letters from the Northern Ireland Office confirming they were not wanted for prosecution under a related scheme. A House of Commons committee later found that O'Hare had, in effect, been the person responsible for the start of the whole process, yet she was never issued such a letter and did not avail of the scheme herself.

In March 2011, O'Hare visited Portland, Oregon, where she laid a wreath at a memorial to the Great Famine and addressed the annual dinner of the city's Ancient Order of Hibernians. She argued that Northern Ireland's continued position within the United Kingdom no longer served anyone's interests, and, discussing the state of the Irish economy following the 2008 financial crash, condemned the government's bailout of Irish banks as fundamentally wrong. She also drew a parallel between the hunger strikes led by Bobby Sands in 1980-81 and her own experience of imprisonment in Limerick during the 1970s.

She returned to live in Dublin around 2019, having spent close to two decades in the US role.

O'Hare's status as an on-the-run fugitive continued to attract political controversy in later years. In June 2022, DUP MP Ian Paisley Jr unsuccessfully sought an amendment to Troubles-related amnesty legislation that would have allowed people living outside Northern Ireland to still face prosecution for alleged paramilitary offences, telling the House of Commons that O'Hare exemplified the kind of case the amendment was intended to address.

== Personal life ==
O'Hare was married to Gerry O'Hare from 1960 until their divorce in the early 1990s; the couple had three children, Terry, Frances and Rory. She later had a fourth child, Ciaran, with her partner Brendan Brownlee, also a Belfast-born republican living in Dublin. At the time of her death she was survived by Brownlee, her four children, eleven grandchildren, nine great-grandchildren and her brother, Alan. Her first husband, Gerry O'Hare, who went on to become a journalist with The Irish Press and later founded the magazine Travel Extra, died in Belfast in October 2020, aged 79.

Colleagues described O'Hare as demanding and exacting. In a eulogy delivered at her funeral, Mary Lou McDonald recalled her as "formidable, honourable, kind, compassionate, terrifying... fierce and acerbic", adding that O'Hare had been a stickler for professionalism and grammar who expected the highest standards from party colleagues, regardless of rank.

== Death and funeral ==
O'Hare died at her home in Dublin on the night of 3 March 2023, aged 80, following a long illness. Sinn Féin president Mary Lou McDonald led tributes, describing her as "a genuine patriot". Other tributes described her as a "powerhouse" within Sinn Féin and the republican movement. US congressman Richard Neal, a longtime friend, said her contributions to peace, justice and reconciliation in Ireland would never be forgotten, while Pennsylvania state representative Kevin J. Boyle credited her with helping to prevent the return of a hard border to Ireland after Brexit.

O'Hare's funeral took place at Glasnevin Cemetery in Dublin on 7 March 2023. Her tricolour-draped coffin was carried by, among others, McDonald and Sinn Féin vice-president Michelle O'Neill, along with former party leader Gerry Adams, who delivered an oration. Adams told mourners that O'Hare's grandchildren and great-grandchildren should be told that their grandmother had fought in the IRA as a rebel and freedom fighter, so that future generations might grow up in a united Ireland. In her own address inside the crematorium, McDonald described O'Hare as "an unstoppable force for Irish freedom" and credited her with a central role in building Sinn Féin into a modern political party, pledging that the party would continue working towards Irish unity in her memory.

The presence of senior Sinn Féin figures at O'Hare's funeral, and the manner in which she was commemorated, drew criticism from unionist politicians. Speaking at the Northern Ireland Affairs Committee at Westminster days after the funeral, DUP MP Carla Lockhart said the sight of McDonald and O'Neill carrying the coffin of a woman wanted in Northern Ireland for the attempted murder of an army officer amounted to the "continual glorification of terrorism", and said such commemoration risked "encouraging young people to take up arms, get involved in criminality". Northern Ireland Secretary Chris Heaton-Harris responded that responsibility for addressing the glorification of paramilitary violence lay primarily with the Stormont Executive rather than the UK government.

== Memoir ==
In August 2024, a memoir titled Rita was published by Greenisland Press, edited by her former colleague Danny Morrison and featuring a foreword by Gerry Adams. The book recounts her upbringing and education in west Belfast, her joining of the IRA, and the only occasion on which she is known to have returned to Northern Ireland during her decades in exile. In 2003, O'Hare was driven across the border in disguise, her distinctive red hair concealed beneath a wig borrowed from a friend undergoing chemotherapy, to visit her dying father, Billy McCulloch, at a nursing home near Newcastle, County Down. The trip was arranged by Siobhán O'Hanlon, herself then terminally ill with cancer, and her husband Pat Sheehan, later a Sinn Féin MLA, who drove O'Hare to see her father for the last time; O'Hare had earlier been unable to attend the funeral of her mother, Maureen, because of the outstanding warrant against her.

== Notes ==
Media offices
| Preceded by Mick Timothy | Editor of An Phoblacht; 1985–1990 | Succeeded by Micheal Mac Donncha |
Party political offices
| Preceded by Danny Morrison | Sinn Féin Director of Publicity; 1990–1998 | Succeeded by Dawn Doyle |
| Preceded by Mitchel McLaughlin | General Secretary of Sinn Féin; 2007–2009 | Succeeded by Dawn Doyle |
| Preceded by ? | Treasurer of Sinn Féin with Maurice Quinlivan; 2009–2023 | Succeeded by TBD |
