= Garibaldi biscuit =

British rectangular biscuit with a middle layer of currants

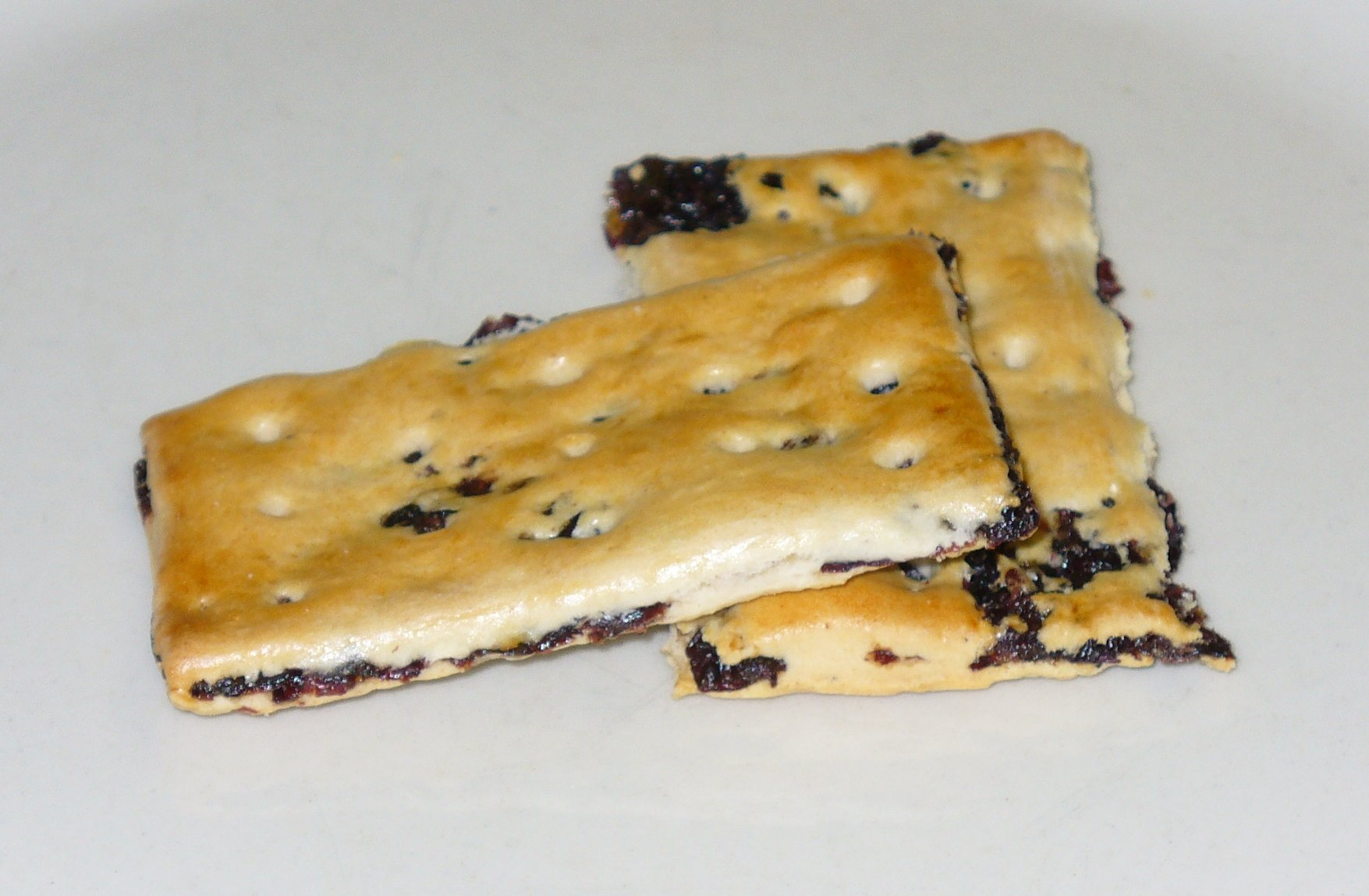
- Type: Biscuit
- Place of origin: United Kingdom
- Created by: Jonathan Carr
- Main ingredients: Currants, biscuits

The Garibaldi biscuit consists of currants squashed and sandwiched between two thin oblongs of biscuit dough before baking. The biscuits are similar to Eccles cake.

Popular with British consumers as a snack for over 150 years, the Garibaldi biscuit is conventionally consumed with tea or coffee. The biscuits also exist under different names in other countries, including Australia (with the name "Full O'Fruit") and New Zealand (with the name "Fruitli Golden Fruit"). In the Netherlands, Sultana, a similar biscuit, has been produced since 1935 by Verkade. Another similar biscuit is the Golden Fruit Raisin Biscuit, once made by Sunshine Biscuits in the US.

== Appearance ==
When bought in supermarkets in the UK (under several brands, all very similar), Garibaldi biscuits usually come in four strips of five biscuits each. They have a golden brown, glazed exterior and a moderately sweet pastry, but their defining characteristic is the layer of squashed fruit which gives rise to the colloquial name dead fly biscuits, squashed fly biscuits, because the squashed fruit resemble squashed flies.

== History ==
The Garibaldi biscuit was named after Giuseppe Garibaldi, the Italian general, revolutionary and leader of the struggle to unify the Kingdom of Italy, which was achieved in 1861. Garibaldi made a popular visit to South Shields in England in 1854; legend has it that during this visit he sat on two biscuits when meeting Joseph Cowen. However, it is more likely the biscuit was first manufactured by the Bermondsey biscuit company Peek Freans in 1861 following the recruitment of Jonathan Carr, one of the great biscuit makers of Carlisle. In the US, the Sunshine Biscuit Company for many years made a popular version of the Garibaldi with raisins which it called Golden Fruit. Sunshine was bought by the Keebler Company, which briefly expanded the line to include versions filled with other fruits. The Golden Fruit product line was discontinued when Keebler became a division of Kellogg's in 2001.

Varieties covered with plain or milk chocolate have also been marketed in the past, but appear not to have been available for many years.

== See also ==
- Flies' graveyard
