= Roy Greenslade =

British academic and journalist (born 1946)

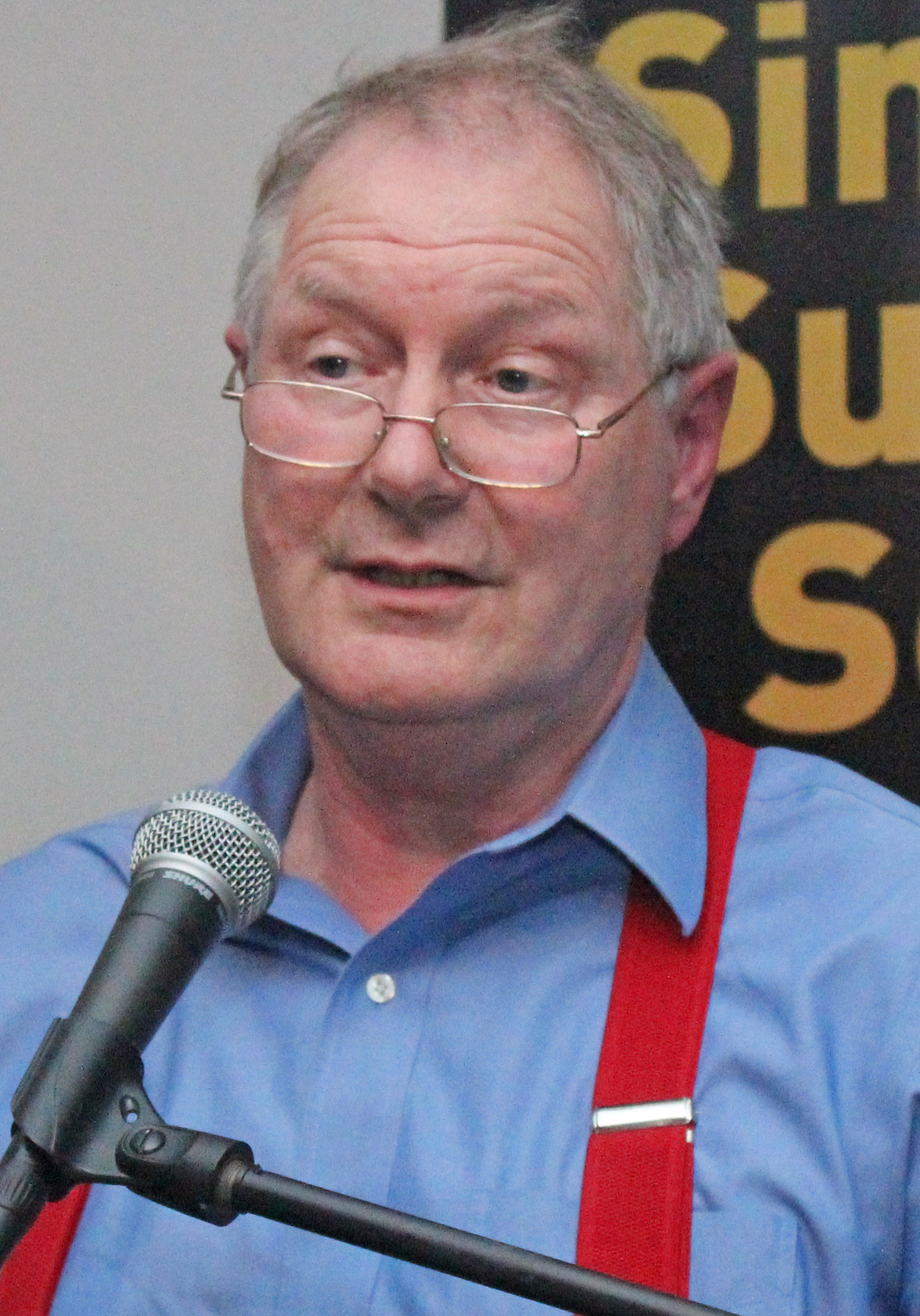
- Greenslade in 2013
- Born: 31 December 1946 (age 79)
- Other name: George King
- Occupations: Journalist; academic
- Spouse: Noreen McElhone
- Relatives: Natascha McElhone (stepdaughter)

Roy Greenslade (born 31 December 1946) is a British author and freelance journalist, and a former professor of journalism. He worked in the UK newspaper industry from the 1960s onwards. As a media commentator, he wrote a daily blog from 2006 to 2018 for The Guardian and a column for London's Evening Standard from 2006 to 2016. Under a pseudonym, Greenslade also wrote for the Sinn Féin newspaper An Phoblacht during the late 1980s whilst also working on Fleet Street. In 2021, it was reported in The Times newspaper, citing an article by Greenslade in the British Journalism Review, that he supported the bombing campaign of the Provisional IRA. Following this revelation, Greenslade resigned as Honorary Visiting Professor at City, University of London.

== Early life and career ==
Greenslade's father, Ernest Frederick William, was an insurance clerk, and his mother Joan Olive (née Stocking) was a book-keeper. The family lived initially with his mother's parents in Dulwich before moving to a council house in South Ockendon. They later bought a bungalow in Leigh-on-Sea, and he travelled 32 miles each day to a grammar school in Dagenham, the Dagenham County High School, from 1957 to 1963. He has a younger brother.

Greenslade started work at the Barking and Dagenham Advertiser aged 17, and also delivered the newspaper to newsagents to supplement his low wages. After three years he joined the Lancashire Evening Telegraph in Blackburn as a sub-editor, before spending 18 months as a sub-editor at the Manchester office of the Daily Mail. Greenslade was an early member of the Communist Party of Britain (Marxist–Leninist).

== The Sun, Daily Mirror and elsewhere (1969 to 1991) ==
In 1969, Greenslade entered Fleet Street as a news sub-editor on The Sun, which had just been acquired by Rupert Murdoch. He had a brief spell with the Daily Mirror in 1972 before returning to The Sun as deputy chief sub-editor, first with the news desk and later in the features department.

Greenslade left The Sun in 1974 to write his first book and to take a degree in politics at the University of Sussex. He worked his way through university with part-time sub-editing jobs at the Brighton Argus, BBC Radio Brighton, the Sunday Mirror and Reveille. After graduating in 1979, he joined the Daily Star in Manchester for six months until being seconded to the Daily Express in London. He was soon appointed features editor of the Daily Star.

In 1981, he returned to The Sun as assistant editor. He was involved in the move from Fleet Street to Wapping. Five years later, he transferred to The Sunday Times, first running the Review Section before becoming managing editor (news). In 1990, he was appointed editor of the Daily Mirror by Robert Maxwell.

While editor of the Daily Mirror, Greenslade rigged a spot-the-ball competition in the paper to make sure it was un-winnable on instructions from his proprietor, Robert Maxwell. He admitted his behaviour in his 1992 biography of Maxwell (see below), which he repeated in October 2011 during a seminar at the Leveson Inquiry, saying: ″Mea culpa, mea culpa, mea culpa.″

Greenslade departed from the Mirror in March 1991. He was briefly consultant editor to both The Sunday Times and Today newspapers.

== The Guardian and other outlets (1992 to 2016) ==
From 1992 until 2005, Greenslade was media commentator for The Guardian. He spent three months with The Daily Telegraph in a similar capacity before returning to The Guardian to launch a daily media blog, which ended in 2018. He also wrote a weekly media column for the Evening Standard. His column for the Standard lasted for ten years until April 2016. In the context of a changing industry, Greenslade concluded his last column for the Standard with the observation: "Whatever happens, this I know: journalism, the trade I have practised for more than 50 years, must survive. Without it, democracy itself is imperilled".

He presented BBC Radio 4's Mediumwave (1993–95) and in 1996 was the launch presenter of Britain Talks Back on Granada Talk TV. He was a regular broadcaster on media matters.

== Other work ==
Greenslade is on the board of an academic quarterly, the British Journalism Review, and was a trustee of the media ethics charity, MediaWise. In 2003, he was appointed Professor of Journalism at City University, London, in succession to Hugh Stephenson. He stepped down in 2018, becoming an Honorary Visiting Professor until 2021.

Greenslade has been credited with coining the term hierarchy of death as well as writing extensively on the subject.

== Publications ==
Greenslade is the author of five books: Goodbye to the Working Class (1976), Maxwell's Fall (1992), Press Gang: How Newspapers Make Profits from Propaganda (2003), The Peer, the Priests and the Press: A Story of the Demise of Irish Landlordism (2023) and Rogue: The Rise and Fall of Mazher 'Fake Sheikh' Mahmood (2025).

His other published work includes:

"William de Belleroche, 1912-1969" (The Fine Art Society, London, 1989)

"Subterfuge, set-ups, stings and stunts: how red-tops go about their investigations" in Investigative Journalism, ed. Hugo de Burgh (Routledge, 2000)

"Editors as censors: the British press and films about Ireland" in Journal of Popular British Cinema, 3/2000.

"Does dumbing up mean duller?" in Communication Ethics Today, ed. Richard Keeble (Troubador, 2005)

"Commuting: Belles, Buffers and Bores", in The Brighton Book, ed. Melissa Benn (Myriad, 2005)

"Seeking Scapegoats: The coverage of asylum in the UK press", Asylum and Migration Working Paper 5, Institute for Public Policy Research, 2005

Foreword to Political Censorship and the Democratic State: The Irish Broadcasting Ban, eds. Mary P. Corcoran and Mark O'Brien (Dublin, 2005)

"Myth-representation: how drugs give journalists the perfect chance to stereotype, vilify and sensationalise", Drug Link magazine, 2006

"Evolution...or extinction", with Alan Rusbridger, RSA Journal, vol. 153, June 2006

"Fleet Street’s graveyard of truth" in Hunger Strike: Reflections on the 1981 hunger strike, ed. Danny Morrison (Brandon/Mount Eagle, 2006)

Foreword to W.T. Stead: Newspaper Revolutionary, eds. Laurel Brake, Ed King, Roger Luckhurst & James Mussell (London: British Library, 2012)

"The catalyst that may turn the 26 into 32" in Brexit and Northern Ireland: Bordering on the Confusion, eds. John Mair, Steven McCabe, Neil Fowler & Leslie Budd (Bite-sized Books, 2019)

Foreword to Media Guidelines for Reporting Suicide (Samaritans, 2020)

"How the United Kingdom’s tabloids go about it" in Investigative Journalism, third edition, eds. Hugo de Burgh and Paul Lashmar (Routledge, 2021)

Greenslade was interviewed by National Life Stories (C467/14) in 2007 for the "Oral History of the British Press" collection held by the British Library.

== Irish republicanism ==
During the late 1980s, when he was managing news editor of The Sunday Times, Greenslade secretly wrote for An Phoblacht, a newspaper published by Sinn Féin. His pseudonym was George King. Greenslade wrote in a 2021 British Journalism Review article that it was revealed by Nick Davies, a Guardian colleague, with his consent. When Greenslade reviewed Davies's book on his blog in 2008, he did not deny his contributions to An Phoblacht. On the 30th anniversary of the H Block prison hunger strikes, Greenslade gave a speech at a Sinn Féin conference in London and An Phoblacht published his article on the subject.

Greenslade has had a house in County Donegal for many years, and a close personal friend is Pat Doherty, who from 1988 until 2009 was vice-president of Sinn Féin, and who has been publicly named as a former member of the IRA Army Council. He also stood surety in 2013 for IRA member John Downey, one of the suspects in the 1982 bombing of Hyde Park which killed four soldiers. As part of the terms of the Good Friday agreement he was not required to stand trial, Greenslade wrote.

The Spectator magazine in February 2000 published an article by Stephen Glover which alleged Greenslade was part of a "Republican cell" at The Guardian and that "there is no doubting his Republican sympathies." Then editor Alan Rusbridger denied Glover's claims of the paper having a "Republican cell" at the time and decades later when Greenslade's views became clear. Greenslade's undeclared allegiances were sufficiently well known for Private Eye over many years to use the nickname "Roy of the Provos" when mentioning the journalist - an echo of Roy of the Rovers, the footballer hero of a long-running strip in British comics.

In the British Journalism Review article, Greenslade stated he had secretly and explicitly supported the IRA's bombing campaign since the early 1970s. His reasoning for keeping his convictions secret, including refusing to disclose them to his commissioning editors when he wrote articles about Irish republicanism or Sinn Féin, was that he needed "to pay his mortgage". Following these disclosures in 2021, he resigned from his post as Honorary Visiting Professor at City, University of London.

Greenslade has received particular criticism for an article he wrote in 2014 for The Guardian criticising a "lack of political balance" in a BBC TV programme which examined rape allegations made by Máiría Cahill against a senior member of the Provisional IRA. Rusbridger called his conduct "at best, hypocritical", and James Bloodworth, in a Sunday Times article, described him as an "IRA apologist" and the IRA's "useful idiot". The online version of the Cahill article now acknowledges the complaint with comments from the Readers' Editor indicating "the writer’s political position should have been indicated openly." Greenslade has been criticised by Rusbridger, his former editor at The Guardian, for his behaviour over this article and lack of transparency over his belief in the IRA's armed struggle. Rusbridger, Greenslade and The Guardian have since apologised to Cahill for the article.

== Personal life ==
Greenslade is married to Noreen Taylor, a former feature writer for the Daily Mirror, who is the mother of the actress Natascha McElhone.

Media offices
Preceded by Richard Stott	Editor of the Daily Mirror; 1990–1991	Succeeded by Richard Stott
