= Sean Murray (Irish republican) =

Irish political activist

Sean Murray is an Irish republican from Belfast, Northern Ireland.

He is the chairman of the Springfield Road Residents Action Group, a group that has opposed the annual Whiterock Orange Order parade near their Belfast neighbourhood. He is a former member of the Provisional Irish Republican Army and was jailed for 12 years for explosives offences in 1982.

The Sunday Life alleged in May 2002 that Murray was a member of the IRA General Headquarters (GHQ) staff. The Sunday Times reported in July 2005 that security sources believed that he was a member of the IRA Army Council.

He is a regular contributor to An Phoblacht.
