= Fruit slice =

Fruit slice can refer to different types of pastries that are traditionally made from bakery leftovers and sold cheaply in bakeries. The term is applied to any such sweet pastry that contains a currant or raisin filling. The name or nickname of the confection varies by locality.

== Flies' graveyard ==
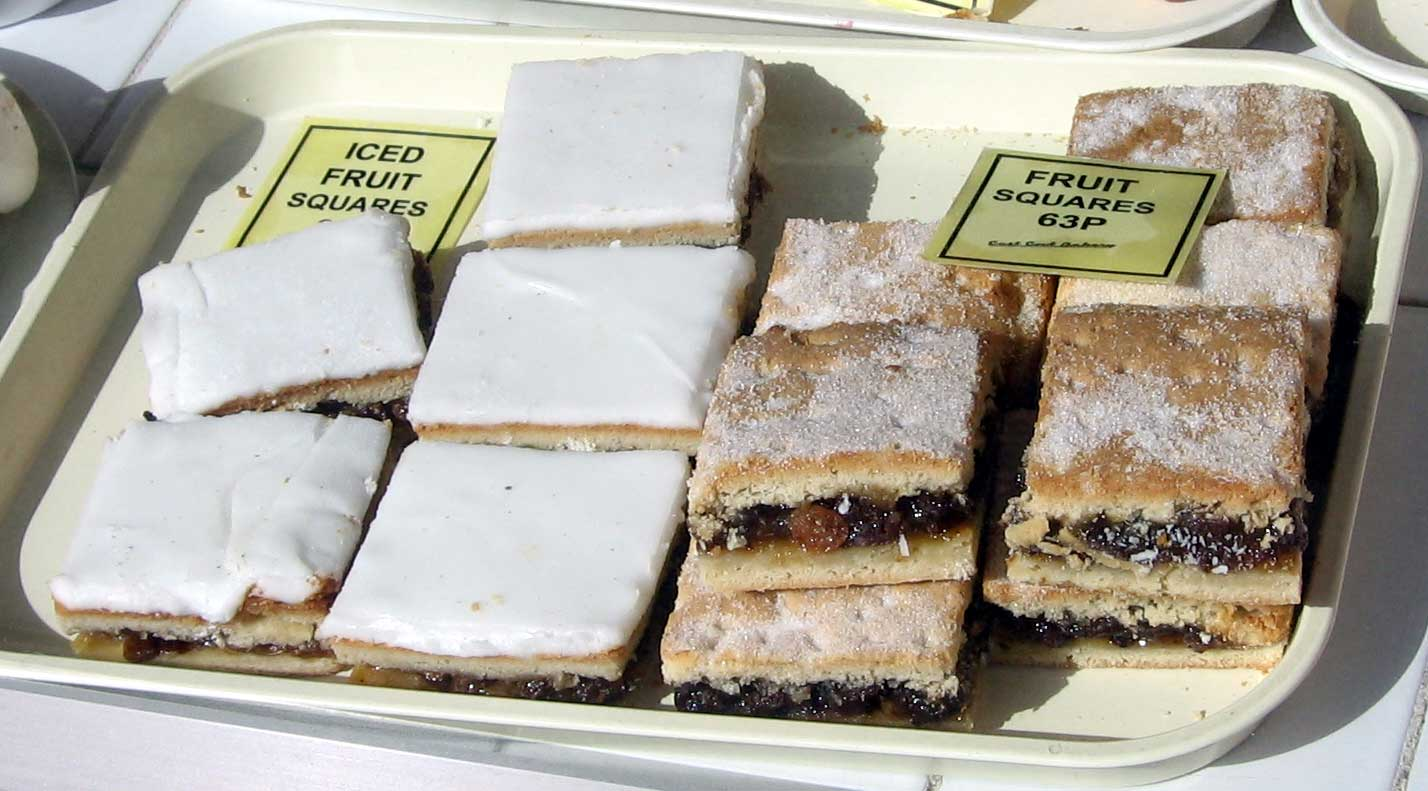
Flies' graveyard in Scotland

Flies' graveyard and flies' cemetery are nicknames used in various parts of the United Kingdom, as well as New Zealand, for sweet pastries filled with currants or raisins, which are jokingly said to resemble dead flies.

In Scotland, they are known as fly cakes, fruit slices, or fruit squares, while in Northern Ireland, they are also referred to as currant squares. In the North East of England, the pastries are fly cakes or fly pie.

The Garibaldi biscuit, which contains a layer of squashed currants, is commonly known as a "fly sandwich", "squashed fly biscuit", or "dead fly biscuit" in the UK.

== Gur cake ==
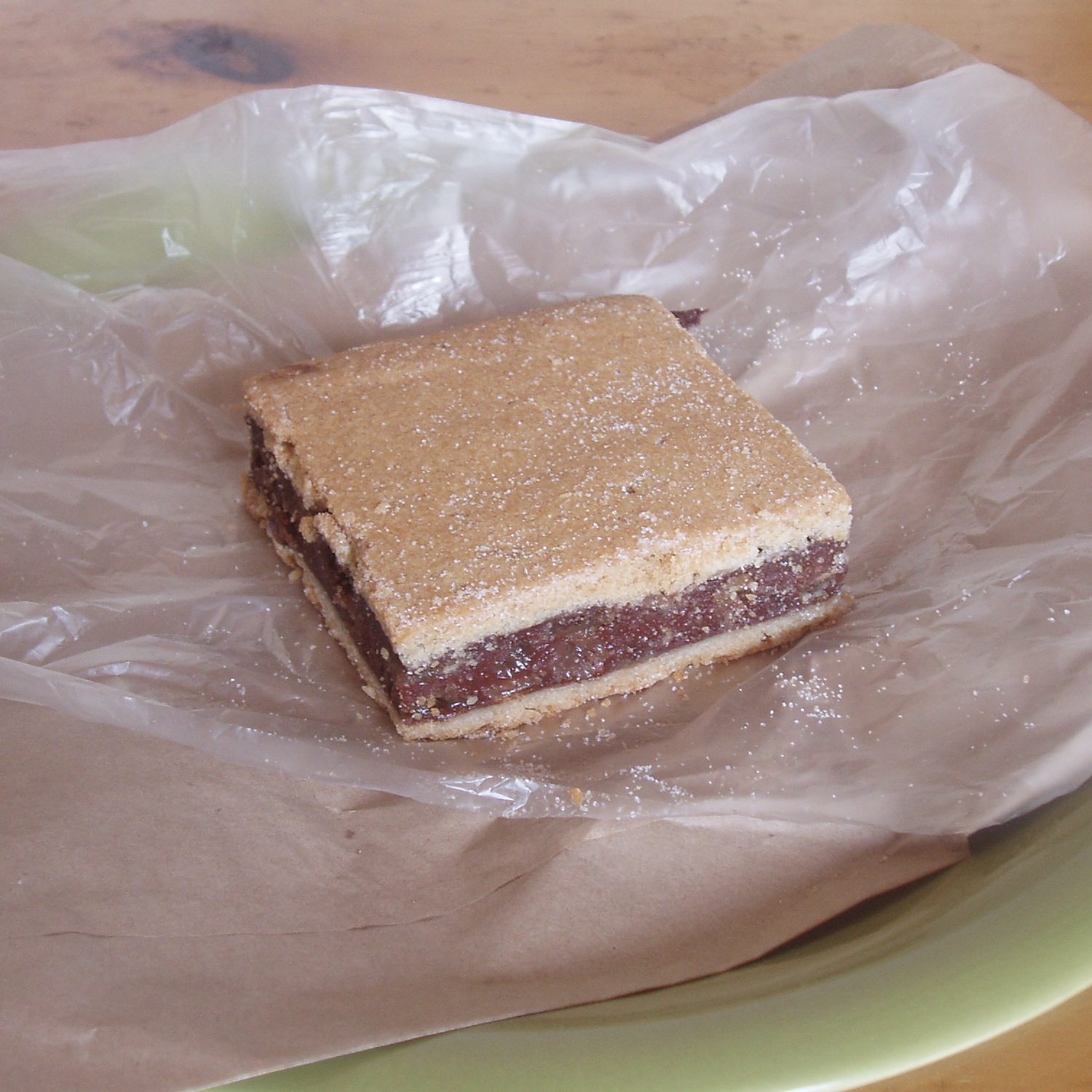
Gur cake

Gur cake is a pastry confection traditionally associated with Dublin, Ireland. Known as Chester cake in other areas of Ireland and elsewhere, and gudge or donkey's gudge in Cork, it is similar to what is termed "flies' graveyard" in parts of the UK, and consists of a thick layer of filling between two thin layers of pastry. The filling is a dark brown paste, containing a mixture of cake/bread crumbs, dried fruits (sultana raisins etc.), and a sweetener/binder. It has traditionally been a cheap confection, made from bakery leftovers.

Its name is thought to be a contraction of "gurrier cake". Children who skipped school were known as gurriers and the act of skipping school became known as to be 'on the gur'. As Gur cake was made of leftovers, it was one of the cheaper items in bakeries and, therefore, one of the few items affordable to a child 'on the gur'. Honor Moore, a Dublin food writer, recorded that in the 1940s, these cakes were referred to as "depth charges" owing to their density and weight like the WWII bombs.

In bakeries, it is typically sold cut into squares of about 8 by 3 cm (3.1 by 1.2 in) thick.

In Dublin, Gur cake is regarded as symbolic of working-class areas, being highlighted in books such as Gur Cake and Coal Blocks (1976) by historian Éamonn Mac Thomáis.

== See also ==
- Eccles cake
- Galaktoboureko
- Vanilla slice
