= An Phoblacht =

Irish republican newspaper published by Sinn Féin

- An Phoblacht front page from June 2014
- Type: Monthly political newspaper
- Format: Tabloid
- Publisher: Parnell Publications
- Editor: John Hedges
- Founded: 13 December 1906 (original); January 1970 (current)
- Political alignment: Irish republicanism Left-wing
- Language: Irish; English
- Headquarters: Kevin Barry Memorial Hall, 44 Parnell Square West, Dublin 1, Ireland
- Website: anphoblacht.com

An Phoblacht (Irish pronunciation: [ənˠ ˈfˠɔbˠlˠəxt̪ˠ]; English: "The Republic") is a Sinn Féin-affiliated online Irish republican news platform which also publishes a quarterly print magazine format. Editorially the paper takes a left-wing position and was supportive of the Northern Ireland peace process. Along with covering Irish political and trade union issues, the newspaper frequently featured interviews with celebrities, musicians, artists, intellectuals and international activists.

== History ==
=== Earlier publications ===
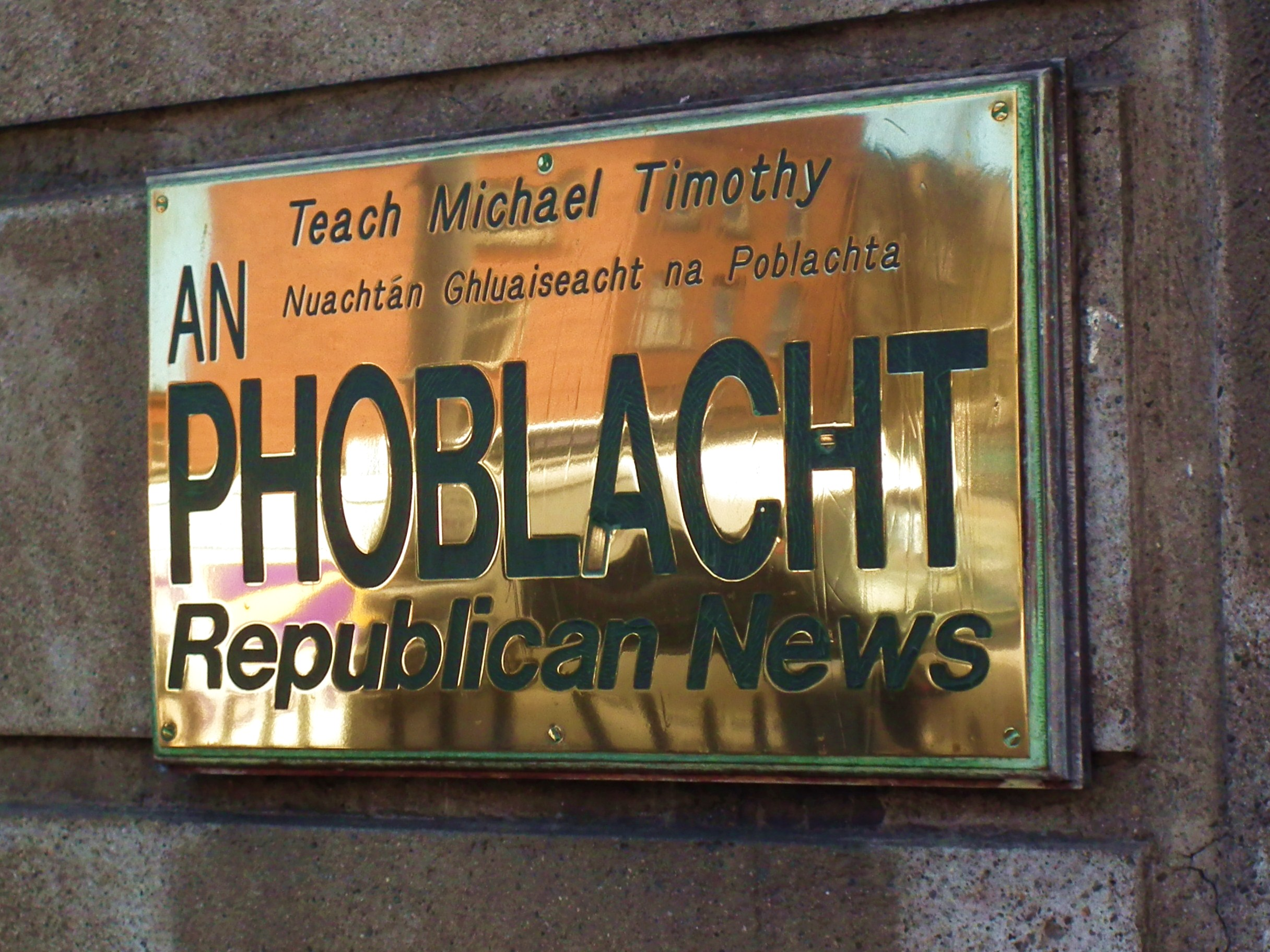
A plaque outside An Phoblacht Headquarters at 58 Parnell Square. The building itself is named in memory of former editor, Mick Timothy.

The original An Phoblacht was founded as the official organ of the Dungannon Clubs in Belfast in 1906 and its first edition was printed on 13 December 1906 under the English-language version of the title The Republic. In the first edition, Bulmer Hobson, one of the founders of the Dungannon Clubs, set out their aims:

Ireland today claims her place among the free peoples of the Earth. She has never surrendered that claim, nor will ever she surrender it, and today forces are working in Ireland that will not be still until her claim is acknowledged and her voice heard in the councils of the nations.

A year later the paper merged with a Dublin publication called The Peasant. However, the title An Phoblacht was again used from 1925 with Patrick Little (P. J. Little) as its editor during a tumultuous period of internal splits and constant suppression by the government. From 1925 into 1926, Seán Lemass wrote a number of articles advocating engagement in politics prior to the establishment of Fianna Fáil. Peadar O'Donnell took over as editor in April 1926 following a split in the Irish republican movement (Little became one of the founding members of Fianna Fáil). Frank Ryan also edited the paper for some time; other prominent contributors during this time included Maurice Twomey, Seán MacBride, Frank Gallagher (who became the first editor of The Irish Press), Hanna Sheehy-Skeffington and Fr Michael O'Flanagan. The title appeared again in 1966 as the paper of a small IRA splinter group based in Cork.

=== 1970-founded publication ===
Its modern version was again refounded immediately following the Sinn Féin split by Jimmy Steele in January 1970, An Phoblacht supporting the group led by Ruaírí O'Bradaigh that became the Provisional Irish Republican Army when the split with the Official Irish Republican Army occurred.

In 1970, An Phoblacht was at first circulated only in the South with another republican paper also established in Northern Ireland in 1970, Republican News, under the editorship of veteran republican Jimmy Steele. It supported the campaign of the Provisional Irish Republican Army and published a weekly column titled "War News", which outlined IRA actions and conflict with the British Army, and provided in depth analysis of the policies being formulated by the Republican movement. An Phoblacht began with a circulation of 20,000 per month.

Located at 2a Lower Kevin Street in Dublin's south inner city, it moved to the northside of the capital, to Kevin Barry House, 44 Parnell Square, in August 1972. And in that October it became a fortnightly publication under the editorship of Éamonn MacThomáis, a writer and historian who instituted changes in layout and general improvements so that it became a weekly publication. After 1976, the then Minister for Post and Telecommunications, Conor Cruise O'Brien, a Labour Party minister in the Fine Gael/Labour coalition, strengthened Jack Lynch's original 1971 Section 31 censorship directive banning members of the IRA or its political wing Sinn Féin from the airwaves. However this ban did not extend to the print media. Section 31 produced a climate where many career journalists engaged in self-censorship to avoid official opprobrium.

An Phoblacht became more important in disseminating the republican message and highlighting what it saw as the naked state oppression by the Unionist Party and the Royal Ulster Constabulary in Northern Ireland. However, it was the southern Irish government which harassed An Phoblacht most stridently, with regular Garda Special Branch investigations into the publication's links (both real and alleged) to the IRA. Mac Thomáis was arrested and charged with IRA membership and sentenced to 15 months' imprisonment having been found guilty of the offence. The paper continued under the stewardship of Dublin journalist Deasún Breathnach until Mac Thomáis resumed duties on his release in July 1974. Within two months, Mac Thomáis was again arrested and sentenced to another 15 months. Another editor, Coleman Moynihan, who had succeeded Seán Ó Brádaigh in 1972, suffered a similar fate. The paper continued on with the succeeding editors being Gerry Danaher (1974–75), Gerry O'Hare (1975–77), and Deasún Breathnach (1977–79).

=== Amalgamation with Republican News ===
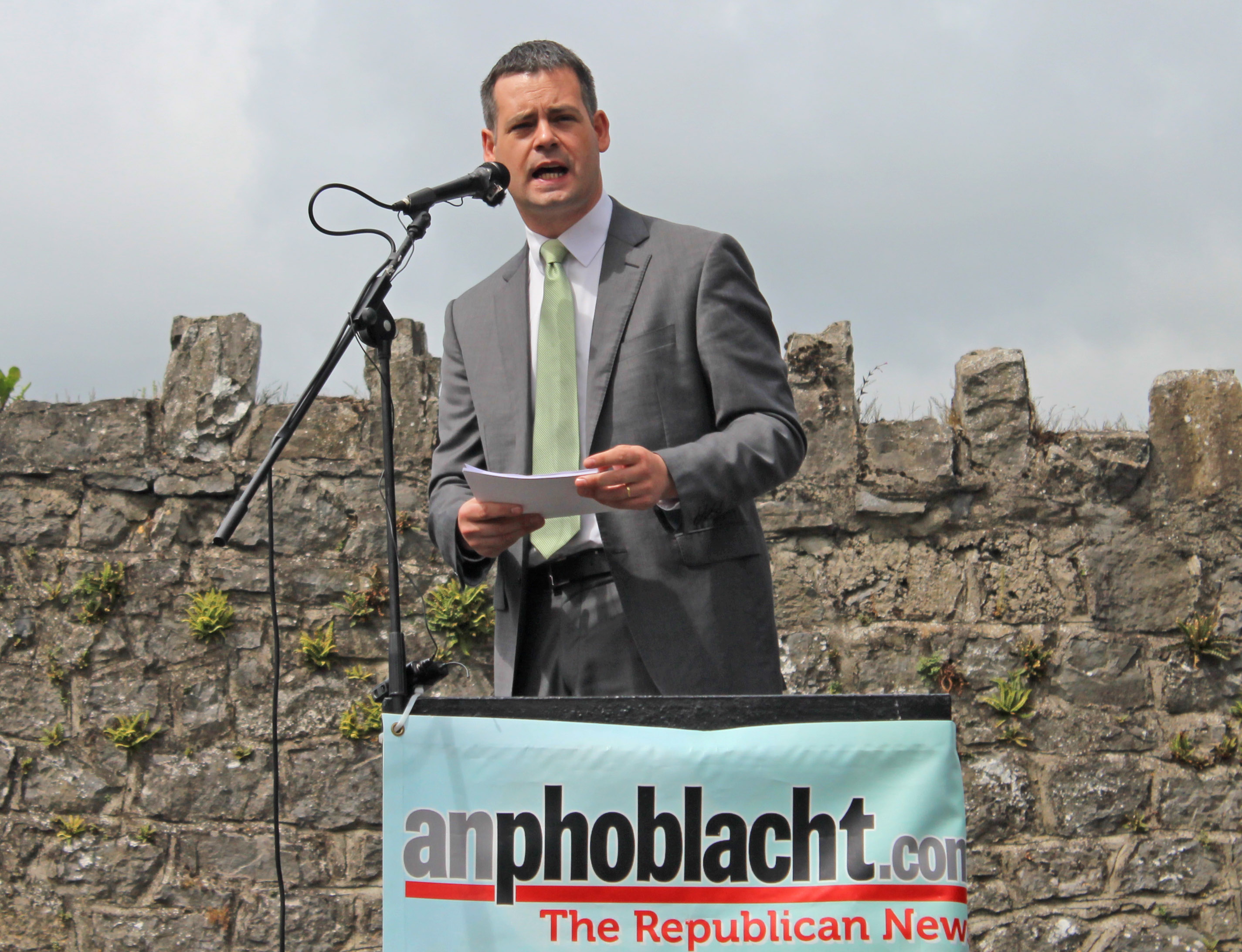
Pearse Doherty TD delivers the main oration at the annual Wolfe Tone Commemoration in Bodenstown, 2013. The podium carries a banner advertising An Phoblacht to the audience

The Republican Movement (Sinn Féin and the IRA) felt that a single paper for the whole of Ireland was required to provide a clear and coherent line from the leadership and to counter what they regarded as any partitionist thinking which might flow from the Partition of Ireland. Accordingly, on 27 January 1979, the first 12-page issue of the merged publications, under the banner of An Phoblacht/Republican News (AP/RN), appeared under the editorship of Danny Morrison.

In the final editorial of Republican News on 20 January 1979, the essential thinking behind the merger was outlined: "To improve on both our reporting and analysis of the war in the North and of popular economic and social struggles in the South... the absolute necessity of one single united paper providing a clear line of republican leadership... [and] the need to overcome any partitionist thinking which results from the British-enforced division of this country and of the Irish people."

On 12 May 1979 An Phoblacht published extracts from a secret British Ministry of Defence intelligence document which contained a detailed analysis of the Provisional IRA and the situation in Northern Ireland. The document, written by Brigadier JM Glover, described the IRA as "highly-professional" and capable of sustaining their campaign for at least a further five years, and predicted increasing British military casualties. The publication caused considerable embarrassment to the incoming British Secretary of State for Northern Ireland Humphrey Atkins with Danny Morrison, the paper's editor, forced into hiding for several months. A representative of the Press Association who was passed a copy of the document by AP/RN was also issued an arrest warrant by the British authorities and fled to the United States in response.

During the 1980s An Phoblacht was to the fore in reporting many issues including allegations of abuse of prisoners in Castlereagh and Gough Barracks, the H-Block and Armagh Prison hunger strikes and also coverage of the ongoing conflict in Northern Ireland. Miniature versions of the paper which were about a third of the size were also printed and smuggled into prisoners in Long Kesh, Portlaoise, Armagh and other prisons. During the 1981 hunger strike sales of the newspaper reached up to 60,000 copies per-week and some issues quadrupled in size resulting in some editions running to 48 pages long. During this period An Phoblacht also opened another office based in west Belfast.

In October 1982 Morrison left the newspaper after being elected to the Northern Assembly for the Mid-Ulster constituency. He was succeeded by Mick Timothy who expanded the newspaper from 12 to 16 pages. Timothy died suddenly in January 1985 and was replaced by Rita O'Hare. The headquarters of An Phoblacht was subsequently named after Timothy. During this period An Phoblacht focused strongly on alleged collusion between the British security forces and loyalist paramilitaries such as the UVF. In response the paper came under attack from the UVF and other Loyalist hit squads.

In the 1980s, top Irish government officials questioned senior ministers as to why the paper had not been banned under the Offences Against the State Act 1939 and suggested that the publication could be classed a "treasonable document or seditious document" and thus make it illegal to send it through the post. The officials also suggested blocking the publication's application for official newspaper status. The Attorney General at the time dismissed the move. State papers also revealed that during a meeting on 10 January 1984, the British Secretary of State for Northern Ireland Jim Prior and Irish Minister for Justice Michael Noonan discussed the possibility of banning the publication but recognised that "if one title was stopped, the same paper could appear under a new title".

=== Ulster loyalist attacks ===
In 1991 a group calling itself the Loyalist Retaliation and Defence Group launched a spate of attacks against newsagents who sold An Phoblacht and also targeted AP/RN delivery drivers. On 10 August 1991, a 33-year-old shopkeeper (James Carson) was shot dead in his shop on the Falls Road, Belfast. This was followed by the shooting death of a 66-year-old shopkeeper (Lawrence Murchan) on St James's Road on 28 September 1991. Both were targeted for selling An Phoblacht in their newsagents. On 12 December 1992 AP/RN worker Malachy Carey was shot dead by loyalist gunmen in Ballymoney. In January 1991 the RUC also raided the offices of An Phoblacht in Belfast seizing computer equipment and disks. Letter bombs were also frequently sent to An Phoblacht by loyalist paramilitaries in the 1990s. In one incident on 4 January 1994 a bomb disguised as a book was carried outside of the offices by AP/RN book reviewer Aengus Ó Snodaigh where it exploded a short time later, injuring two members of the Irish Defence Forces bomb disposal unit as they attempted to defuse it. In January 2018, loyalist Winston Churchill Rea was charged with encouraging the murder of "persons working in shops selling An Phoblacht in republican and nationalist areas" between November 1977 and October 1994.

=== Peace Process onwards ===
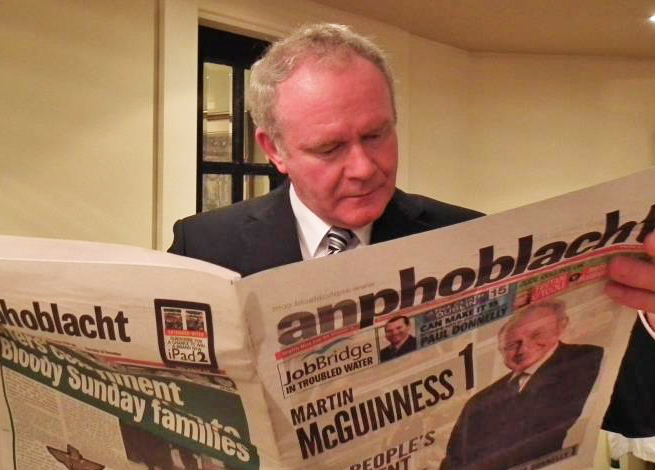
Martin McGuinness reading a copy of An Phoblacht. The newspaper endorsed him during the 2011 Irish presidential election

During the early 1990s AP/RN was the publication which was first to report on many of the moves towards the IRA ceasefire as well as the first place where Sinn Féin peace documents such as Towards a Lasting Peace were published. The paper also played an important role in winning support for a peace strategy from republican activists. In 1997 the paper became one of the first in Ireland to go online.

The paper was officially relaunched in September 2005 as An Phoblacht, dropping the Republican News title although it is still often referred to as such. In 2010, the paper went from a 16-page weekly paper to a 32-page full colour monthly paper. The current editor is John Hedges. In 2013, Seán Crowe TD told the Dáil that republican prisoner John Anthony Downey, from County Donegal, who had been arrested in connection to the Hyde Park bombing and was being held in Belmarsh Prison, had been refused copies of the paper by prison authorities because of the Irish language content contained within it. He stated that other prisoners who spoke different languages had no difficulty in obtaining other publications.

In November 2017 it was announced that An Phoblacht would cease as a monthly print publication and would become an internet based news service with only special editions being made available in magazine format.

== Republican Publications ==
An Phoblacht also publishes books, booklets, posters and magazines under the name Republican Publications. These include:

- The History of the Irish Citizen Army, by RM Fox, 2014 (reprint), ISBN 9781782801849
- The Rotunda: Birthplace of the Irish Volunteers, by Aengus Ó Snodaigh, 2013, ISBN 9781782801832
- Lockout 1913 – Austerity 2013, by Mícheál Mac Donncha, 2013, ISBN 9781782800699
- Glimpses of an Irish Felon's Prison Life, by Thomas J Clarke, 2012(reprint)
- Brian Keenan 1941–2008: A Republican Legend, by Various, 2008
- Máire Drumm: Voice of a Risen People, by Ella O'Dwyer and Caoilfhionn Ní Dhonnabháin, 2006
- Down Dublin Streets, by Éamonn MacThomáis, 2005
- British Intelligence and the Rearming of the Loyalist Death Squads, 1994
- Songs of Resistance, 1968–1982
- Prison Poems, by Bobby Sands, 1981
- Our Own Red Blood: The Story of the 1916 Rising, by Seán Cronin, 1966
- Tragedies of Kerry, by Dorothy Macardle, 1923

== Editors ==
=== 1925–1937 ===
1925: Patrick Little
1926: Peadar O'Donnell
1930: Frank Ryan
1933: Terry Ward of and Liam Mac Gabhann as joint-editors
1934: Domhnall O'Donoghue
1937: Tadhg Lynch

=== 1970–2017 ===
1970: Seán Ó Brádaigh
1972: Coleman Moynihan
1972: Éamonn MacThomáis (Arrested)
1973: Colman Ó Muimhneacháin (Arrested)
1973: Deasún Breathnach
1974: Éamonn MacThomáis (Arrested)
1974: Gerry Danaher
1975: Gerry O'Hare
1977: Deasún Breathnach
1979: Danny Morrison
1982: Mick Timothy
1985: Rita O'Hare
1990: Mícheál Mac Donncha
1996: Brian Campbell
1999: Martin Spain
2005: Seán Mac Brádaigh
2010: Joanne Spain (acting editor during transition from weekly to monthly)
2010: John Hedges

== Notable contributors ==
- Gerry Adams
- Bobby Sands
- Danny Morrison (former editor)
- Roy Greenslade

== List of current frequent contributors ==
- Robert Allen (Environment, Food and Fisheries)
- Gerry Adams (Political columnist)
- Martina Anderson (EU Affairs)
- Lynn Boylan (EU Affairs)
- Matt Carthy (EU Affairs)
- Megan Fearon (Opinion)
- Jane Fisher (Britain correspondent)
- John Hedges (Editor)
- Declan Kearney (Peace Process)
- Mary Lou McDonald (Political columnist)
- Mícheál Mac Donncha (Historian)
- Michael Mannion (Book reviews)
- Dr Conor McCabe (Finance)
- Michael McMonagle (Northern reporter)
- Mark Moloney (Staff Journalist)
- Seán Murray (Peace Process)
- Liadh Ní Riada (EU Affairs)
- Eoin Ó Broin (Political columnist)
- Trevor Ó Clochartaigh (Irish language columnist)
- Eoin Ó Murchú (Political and Irish language columnist)
- Robbie Smyth (Media columnist)
- Joanne Spain (Finance columnist)
- Peadar Whelan (Staff Journalist)
