= Hierarchy of death =

Classification in writing

How many times as many deaths it takes for a disaster in different continents to receive news coverage equal to as if it had occurred in Europe (in major U.S. networks)

Hierarchy of death is a phrase used by journalists, social scientists, and academics to describe disproportionate amounts of media attention paid to various incidents of death around the world.

== Themes ==
Definitions of the hierarchy of death vary, but several themes remain consistent in terms of media coverage: domestic deaths outweigh foreign deaths, deaths in the developed world outweigh deaths in the developing world, deaths of whites outweigh deaths of darker skinned people, and deaths in ongoing conflicts garner relatively little media attention.

== Explanations ==
The phenomenon has been linked to a variety of factors, including stereotypes about different groups of people, familiarity with the deceased, and several psychological theories, such as collapse of compassion, psychic numbing, and disaster fatigue.

== Commentary ==
British media commentator Roy Greenslade has been credited with coining the term while writing on the newsworthiness of those who died during the Troubles. Greenslade also critiqued the phenomenon in media reactions to the Boston Marathon bombings.

NPR discussed the disparity in media coverage between the 2015 Beirut bombings and the November 2015 Paris attacks, which happened within a day of each other.

Scottish journalist Allan Massie has also written on the topic.

== Similar phenomena ==
The hierarchy of death has been compared to missing white woman syndrome.
