= Mass media impact on spatial perception =

Mass media influences spatial perception through journalistic cartography and spatial bias in news coverage.

== Role of journalism ==
Journalism plays a crucial role in providing the general public with information about places and geography. Mass media, which includes television, newspapers, magazines, and radio, significantly shapes perceptions of locations. However, mass media has been criticized for its limited iconography, which constructs generic locations that offer a restricted and distorted worldview. The lack of geographical balance in news coverage may limit spatial knowledge, with US media often focusing on a narrow range of nations and regions for international news.

== Geographic components ==
When news has an important geographic component, journalism concerns itself with the location of the information. Maps are an efficient means of showing location and describing geographic relationships. Mass media may use maps to illustrate spatially distributed data, such as election results, acid rain distribution, radon contamination, weather forecasts, traffic, or travel routes. Maps can also depict stories about battles, geopolitical strategies, or environmental threats. Critics argue that journalistic cartography suffers from deficiencies and constraints due to the lack of formal cartographic training among graphic artists who produce these maps.

== Spatial bias ==
Geographers have explored spatial bias in news reporting. The spatial pattern of news is influenced by journalistic norms, such as national coverage, national interest, geographic stereotypes, and accessibility to news events. Live reporting requires spatial proximity, event proximity, and broadcast proximity. Capitals, major financial centres, and politically unstable places are often geographically stereotyped and considered newsworthy. Economic ties and social distance also play significant roles in news coverage.
