= Sallins Train robbery =

Train robbery in Sallins, Ireland in 1976

The Sallins Train robbery occurred in Ireland on 31 March 1976 when the Cork to Dublin mail train was robbed near Sallins in County Kildare. Approximately £200,000 was stolen. Five members of the Irish Republican Socialist Party (IRSP), Osgur Breatnach, Nicky Kelly, Brian McNally, Mick Plunkett and John Fitzpatrick, were arrested in connection with the robbery.

After the failure of the authorities to produce a "book of evidence" against them, the four were released but were immediately re-arrested. During interrogation in Garda Síochána custody, all except Plunkett signed alleged confessions, presenting with extensive bruising and injuries they claimed were inflicted by members of the Gardaí.

While awaiting trial, Fitzpatrick jumped bail and left the country. The trial of McNally, Kelly and Breatnach in the Special Criminal Court became the longest-running trial in Irish criminal history, at 65 days, before it collapsed due to the death of one of the three judges, Judge John O'Connor of the Circuit Court.

Medical evidence of beatings was presented to the court, both during the initial trial and the second trial. The court rejected this evidence, finding that the beatings had been self-inflicted or inflicted by the co-accused. Anticipating a conviction, Kelly fled before the conclusion of the second trial. The three were found guilty, solely on the basis of their confessions, and sentenced to between nine and 12 years' prison (Kelly was sentenced in absentia).

In May 1980, Breatnach and McNally were acquitted on appeal on the grounds that their statements had been taken under duress. The same month, the Provisional IRA claimed responsibility for the robbery. Kelly returned to Ireland from the USA in June 1980, expecting to be acquitted. Instead he was incarcerated in the maximum-security Portlaoise Prison and spent the next four years proclaiming his innocence, including a 38-day period on hunger strike.

After a campaign by the Irish Council for Civil Liberties, Amnesty International and others (including a song, "Wicklow Boy", by the popular folk singer Christy Moore), Kelly was eventually released on "humanitarian grounds" in 1984. He was given a Presidential pardon in 1992 and received £1,000,000 in compensation. Breatnach and McNally were also given compensation.

In 2026, the wrongful conviction of Breatnach was declared a miscarriage of justice.
