= History of Sinn Féin =

Sinn Féin ("We Ourselves", often mistranslated as "Ourselves Alone") is the name of an Irish political party founded in 1905 by Arthur Griffith. It became a focus for various forms of Irish nationalism, especially Irish republicanism. After the Easter Rising in 1916, it grew in membership, with a reorganisation at its Ard Fheis in 1917. It split in 1922 in response to the Anglo-Irish Treaty which led to the Irish Civil War and saw the origins of Fianna Fáil and Fine Gael, the two parties which have since dominated Irish politics. Another split in the remaining Sinn Féin organisation in the early years of the Troubles in 1970 led to the Sinn Féin of today, which is a republican, left-wing nationalist and socialist party.

== Early years ==
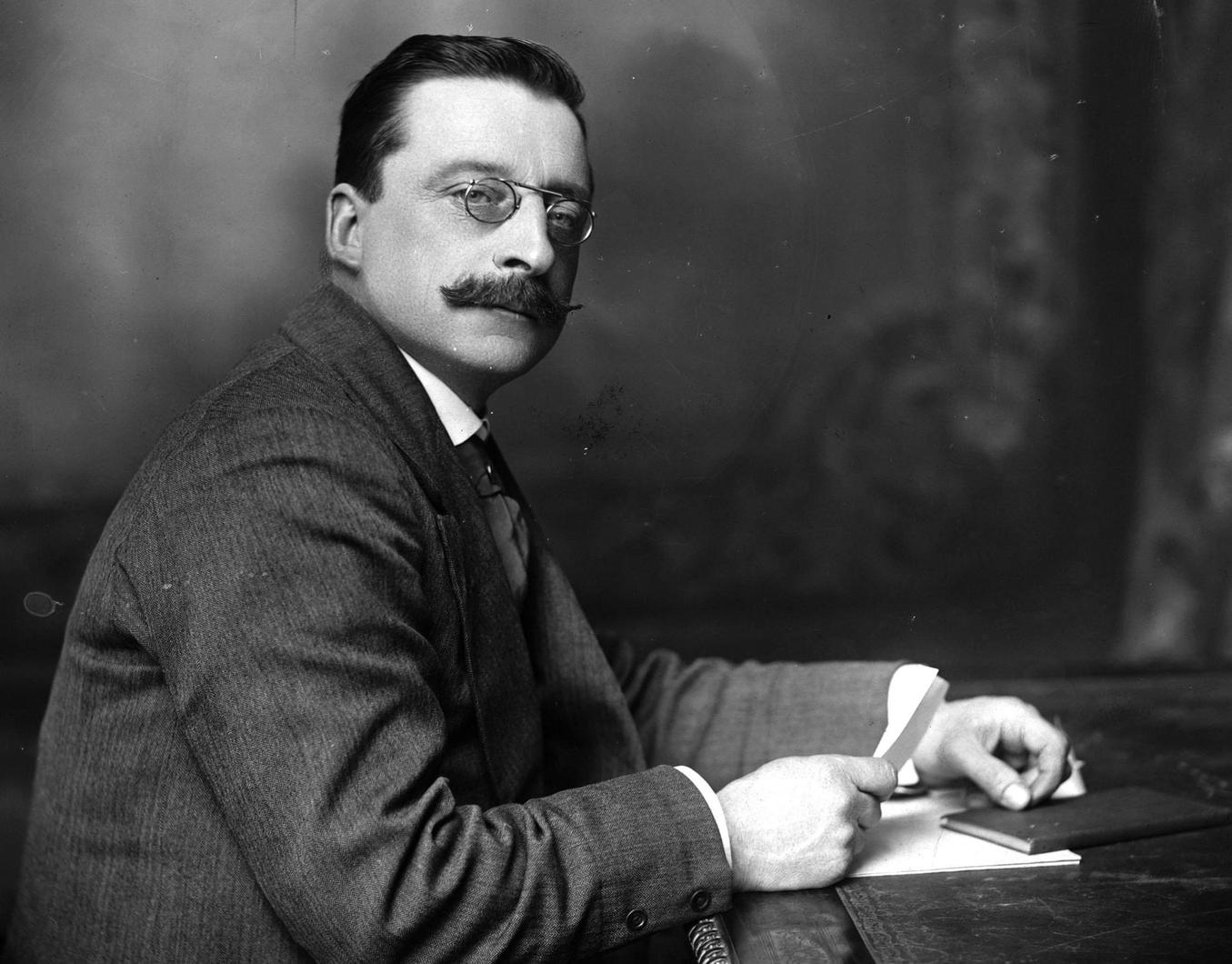
Arthur Griffith, founder (1905) and third president (1911–17)

The ideas that led to Sinn Féin were first propounded by the United Irishman newspaper and its editor, Arthur Griffith. An article by Griffith in that paper in March 1900 called for the creation of an association to bring together the disparate Irish nationalist groups of the time, and as a result Cumann na nGaedheal was formed at the end of 1900. Griffith first put forward his proposal for the abstention of Irish members of parliament from the Westminster parliament at the 1902 Cumann na nGaedheal convention. A second organisation, the National Council, was formed in 1903 by Maud Gonne and others, including Griffith, on the occasion of the visit of King Edward VII to Dublin. Its purpose was to lobby Dublin Corporation to refrain from presenting an address to the king. The motion to present an address was duly defeated, but the National Council remained in existence as a pressure group to increase nationalist representation on local councils.

Griffith elaborated his policy in a series of articles in the United Irishman in 1904, which outlined how the policy of withdrawing from the imperial parliament and passive resistance had been successfully followed in Hungary, leading to the Austro-Hungarian Compromise of 1867 and the creation of a dual monarchy, and proposed that Irish MPs should follow the same course. These were published later that year in a booklet entitled The Resurrection of Hungary. Also in 1904, a friend of Griffith, Mary Ellen Butler (a cousin of Unionist leader Edward Carson), remarked in a conversation that his ideas were "the policy of Sinn Féin, in fact" and Griffith enthusiastically adopted the term. The phrase Sinn Féin ('ourselves' or 'we ourselves') had been in use since the 1880s as an expression of separatist thinking, and was used as a slogan by the Gaelic League in the 1890s.

The first annual convention of the National Council on 28 November 1905 was notable for two things: the decision, by a majority vote (with Griffith dissenting), to open branches and organise on a national basis; and the presentation by Griffith of his 'Hungarian' policy, which was now called the Sinn Féin policy. This meeting is usually taken as the date of the foundation of the Sinn Féin party. In the meantime, a third organisation, the Dungannon Clubs, named after the Dungannon Convention of 1782, had been formed in Belfast by Bulmer Hobson, and it also considered itself to be part of 'the Sinn Féin movement'.

By 1907, there was pressure on the three organisations to unite—especially from the US, where John Devoy offered funding, but only to a unified party. The pressure increased when C. J. Dolan, the Irish Parliamentary Party MP for North Leitrim, announced his intention to resign his seat and contest it on a Sinn Féin platform. In April 1907, Cumann na nGaedheal and the Dungannon Clubs merged as the 'Sinn Féin League'. Negotiations continued until August when, at the National Council annual convention, the League and the National Council merged on terms favourable to Griffith. The resulting party was named Sinn Féin, and its foundation was backdated to the National Council convention of November 1905.

In the 1908 North Leitrim by-election, Sinn Féin secured 27% of the vote. Thereafter, both support and membership fell. Attendance was poor at the 1910 Ard Fheis (party conference), and there was difficulty finding members willing to take seats on the executive. While some local councillors were elected running under the party banner in the 1911 local elections, by 1915 the party was, in the words of one of Griffith's colleagues, "on the rocks", and so insolvent financially that it could not pay the rent on its headquarters in Harcourt Street in Dublin.

== 1917–1922 ==
=== Aftermath of the Easter Rising ===
Although it was blamed for it by the British government, Sinn Féin was not involved in the Easter Rising. The leaders of the Rising were looking for more than the Sinn Féin proposal of a separation stronger than Home Rule under a dual monarchy. Any group that disagreed with mainstream constitutional politics was branded 'Sinn Féin' by British commentators.

In January 1917, George Noble Plunkett, father of the executed 1916 leader Joseph Plunkett, stood for election as an independent in the North Roscommon by-election, in a campaign led by Fr. Michael O'Flanagan, a Sinn Féin organiser, on a policy of appealing for Irish independence at the post-war peace conference. Polling took place in heavy snow on 3 February 1917. Plunkett took the seat by a large majority, and surprised his audience by announcing he intended to abstain from Westminster.

Plunkett summoned a convention in the Mansion House, Dublin in April 1917, where his supporters and those of Griffith failed to reach consensus. When a split seemed imminent, O'Flanagan mediated an agreement between Griffith and Plunkett, and a group known as the Mansion House Committee was formed, tasked with organising forthcoming by-elections and sending an envoy to the Paris peace conference. Plunkett joined the Sinn Féin party. Sinn Féin contested the 1917 South Longford by-election, where Joseph McGuinness, imprisoned in Lewes jail for his part in the Rising, was elected on the slogan "Put him in to get him out". Over the summer of 1917, surviving members of the Rising were freed from prison by Lloyd George, wary of public opinion as he attempted to get America to join the war. Éamon de Valera overcame his reluctance to enter electoral politics, when he was elected in East Clare on 10 July 1917. A fourth by-election was won by W. T. Cosgrave in Kilkenny City.

The Mansion House Committee organised an Ard Fheis in October 1917, where again the party nearly split between its monarchist and republican wings. De Valera was elected president, with Griffith and O'Flanagan as vice-presidents. A compromise motion was passed, which read:

Sinn Féin aims at securing the international recognition of Ireland as an independent Irish republic.
Having achieved that status the Irish people may by referendum freely choose their own form of Government.

This kept the party's options open on the question of the constitutional form of an independent Ireland, although in practice it became increasingly republican in nature.

The Irish Parliamentary Party (IPP) under John Redmond—and later under John Dillon—won three by-elections in early 1918. Sinn Féin came back with victories for Patrick McCartan in Tullamore in April, and Arthur Griffith in East Cavan in June (when Fr. O'Flanagan was suspended by the Catholic Church for making his "Suppressed Speech").

When the British prime minister David Lloyd George called the Irish Convention in July 1917, in an attempt to reach agreement on introducing all-Ireland Home Rule, Sinn Féin declined its allocated five seats on the grounds that the Convention did not allow debate on the full independence of Ireland. After the First World War German spring offensive in March 1918, when Britain threatened to impose conscription on Ireland to bring its decimated divisions up to strength, the ensuing Conscription Crisis decisively swung support behind Sinn Féin. The British Government responded by arresting and interning the leading members of Sinn Féin and hundreds of others not involved in the organisation, accused of complicity in a fictitious German Plot.

=== 1918 electoral victory ===
Sinn Féin vote share in Irish constituencies in the 1918 general election.

Sinn Féin won 73 of Ireland's 105 seats in the House of Commons of the United Kingdom at the December 1918 general election, twenty-five of them uncontested. The IPP, the largest party in Ireland for forty years, had not fought a general election since 1910; in many parts of Ireland its organisation had decayed and was no longer capable of mounting an electoral challenge. Many other seats were uncontested owing to Sinn Féin's mass support, with other parties deciding that there was no point in challenging Sinn Féin given that it was certain to win.

Contemporary documents also suggest a degree of intimidation of opponents. Piaras Béaslaí gave an account from the 1917 South Longford by-election where a Sinn Féin activist put a gun against the head of a returning officer and forced him to announce the election of Joseph McGuinness, the Sinn Féin candidate, even though the IPP candidate had more votes. Potential candidates who were thought of as serious challengers to Sinn Féin candidates were warned against seeking election in some Ulster constituencies and in Munster. In County Cork all the All-for-Ireland League MPs stood down voluntarily in favour of Sinn Féin candidates.

In Ulster, unionists won 23 seats, Sinn Féin 10 and the Irish Parliamentary Party won five (where they were not opposed by Sinn Féin). In the thirty-two counties of Ireland, twenty-four (24) returned only Sinn Féin candidates. In the nine counties of Ulster, unionists polled a majority in four.

Because twenty-five seats were uncontested under dubious circumstances, it has been difficult to determine what the actual support for the party was in the country. Various accounts range from 45% to 80%. Academic analysts at the Northern Ireland demographic institute (ARK) estimate a figure of 53%. Another estimate suggests Sinn Féin had the support of approximately 65% of the electorate (unionists accounting for approximately 20–25% and other nationalists for the remainder). Lastly, emigration was difficult during the war, which meant that tens of thousands of young people were in Ireland who would not have been there under normal circumstances.

On 21 January 1919, twenty-seven Sinn Féin MPs assembled in Dublin's Mansion House and proclaimed themselves the parliament of Ireland, the First Dáil. They elected the Ministry of Dáil Éireann as the executive government of the Irish Republic, headed by the President of Dáil Éireann. From August 1921, de Valera used the title of President of the Irish Republic.

In the 1920 city council elections, Sinn Féin gained control of ten of the twelve city councils in Ireland. Only Belfast and Derry remained under unionist and IPP (respectively) control. In the local elections of the same year, Sinn Féin won control of 25 of the 33 county councils. (Tipperary had two county councils, so there were 33.) Antrim, Down, Londonderry and Armagh were controlled by Unionists, Fermanagh and Tyrone by the Nationalist Party, and in Galway and Waterford no party had a majority.

=== Treaty and Civil War ===
Following the conclusion of the Anglo-Irish Treaty negotiations between representatives of the British Government and the republican government in December 1921 and the narrow approval of the Treaty by Dáil Éireann, a state called the Irish Free State was established. Northern Ireland (a six-county region set up under the British Government of Ireland Act 1920) opted out, as the Treaty allowed.

The reasons for the split were various, although partition was not one of them – the IRA did not split in the new Northern Ireland and pro- and anti-Treaty republicans there looked to pro-Treaty Michael Collins for leadership (and weapons). The principal reason for the split is usually described as the question of the Oath of Allegiance to the Constitution of the Irish Free State, which members of the new Dáil would be required to take, and which included a statement of fidelity to the British King, which many republicans found unacceptable. Supporters of the treaty argued that it gave "freedom to achieve freedom". In the June 1922 election in the area which would become the Irish Free State, the pro-treaty Sinn Féin candidates secured 38% of the first preference vote and 58 seats, against 21% and 35 seats for anti-treaty candidates.

Within days of the election, the Civil War erupted between the supporters of the Treaty and its opponents. De Valera and his supporters sided with the anti-Treaty IRA against the National Army. The pro-Treaty parties, including the Labour Party and Farmers' Party, sat as the 3rd Dáil. On 6 December 1922, when the new state came into being, pro-Treaty Sinn Féin TDs formed the Executive Council of the Irish Free State. Early in 1923, pro-Treaty Sinn Féin TDs led by W. T. Cosgrave formed a new party, Cumann na nGaedheal. The Civil War ended in May 1923, when the anti-Treaty IRA stood down and "dumped arms". In the 1923 general election, Cumann na nGaedheal won 41% of the popular vote and 63 seats; the Anti-Treaty faction (standing as "Republican" and led by de Valera) secured 29% of the vote and 44 seats, but applied an abstentionist policy to the new Dáil Éireann.

== 1923–1932, the Fianna Fáil split ==
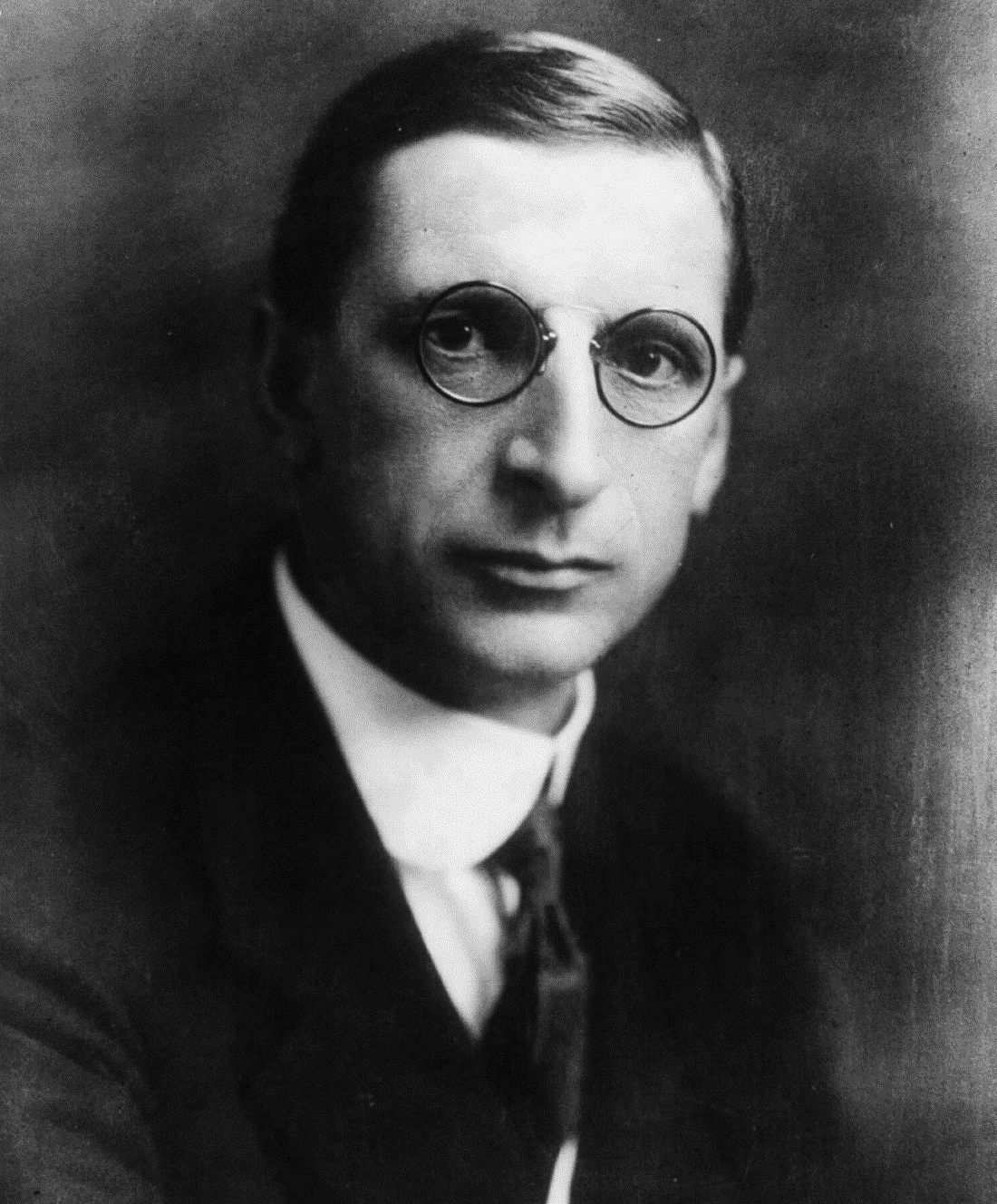
President of Sinn Féin Éamon de Valera resigned from the party in 1926 and led the rump of the membership out of the party and into Fianna Fáil, an event which left Sinn Féin crippled for decades

The seeds of another split were sown when leader Éamon de Valera came to believe that abstentionism was not a workable tactic. In March 1926 the party held its Ard Fheis and de Valera proposed that elected members be allowed to take their seats in the Dáil if and when the controversial oath of allegiance was removed. Mary MacSwiney and Michael O'Flanagan led the abstentionist section opposing the motion. The conference instructed a joint committee of representatives from the two sections to arrange a basis for co-operation. That day it issued a statement declaring "the division within our ranks is a division of Republicans." The next day De Valera's motion narrowly failed by a vote of 223 to 218.

De Valera resigned and formed a new party, Fianna Fáil, on a platform of republicanising the Free State from within. He took the great majority of Sinn Féin support with him, along with most of Sinn Féin's financial support from America. The remains of Sinn Féin fielded only 15 candidates and won only six seats in the June 1927 election, support sinking to a level not seen since before 1916. In the August 1927 by-election following the death of Constance Markievicz, Sinn Féin's Cathal Ó Murchadha gained just 2.5% of the vote. Shortly afterward, vice-president and de facto leader MacSwiney announced that the party simply did not have the funds to contest the second general election called that year, declaring "no true Irish citizen can vote for any of the other parties".

John J. O'Kelly was elected president in place of de Valera and remained in this position until 1931 when Brian O'Higgins took over the leadership. The party did not contest the 1932 general election, which saw Fianna Fáil enter government for the first time.

== 1932–1946, Political isolation ==
During the 1930s Sinn Féin did not contest any elections. Its relationship with the Irish Republican Army (IRA) soured and during the 1930s the IRA severed its links with the party. The party did not have a leader of the stature of Cosgrave or de Valera. Numbers attending the Ard Fheis had dropped to the mid-40s and debates were mainly dominated with issues such as whether members should accept IRA war pensions from the government. Mary MacSwiney left in 1934 when members decided to accept the pensions. Cathal Ó Murchadha led the party from 1935 to 1937. Margaret Buckley was president from 1937 to 1950.

The party suffered with the introduction of internment during the Emergency. An attempt in the 1940s to access funds which had been put in the care of the High Court led to the Sinn Féin Funds case in 1948, which the party lost and in which the judge ruled that it was not the direct successor of the Sinn Féin of 1917.

== 1947–1962, the era of the "Three Macs", the rightward swing of Sinn Féin, and the border campaign ==
In 1947 the IRA held its first Army Convention since World War II. The leadership became dominated by three figures, known jokingly as the "three Macs", Tony Magan, Paddy McLogan, and Tomás Óg Mac Curtain. The "three Macs" believed that a political organisation was necessary to help rebuild the IRA. IRA members were instructed to join Sinn Féin en masse, and despite the IRA's small numbers following WW2, they were successfully able to fully take over the organisation. This takeover of Sinn Féin was made possible due to the weak state of Sinn Féin itself; the party had become a shell of its former self in the decades since the Fianna Fáil split. Paddy McLogan was named Sinn Féin president in 1950, with fellow IRA member Tomás Ó Dubhghaill named vice-president, signalling the IRA's complete control of the party's apparatus.

The party began to advocate a corporatist social policy inspired by the Papal Encyclicals of Pope Pius XI, with the aim of creating a Catholic state, and opposed parliamentary democracy, advocating its replacement with a form of government akin to Portugal's Estado Novo, but rejected fascism as they considered a fascist state to be too secular and centralized.

The re-organisation yielded fruit during the Border Campaign which was launched on 12 December 1956. In the Irish general election of 1957 Sinn Féin fielded 19 abstentionist candidates and won four seats and 6.5% of the popular vote. The introduction of internment and the establishment of military tribunals hindered the IRA campaign and it was called off in 1962. In the 1961 General Election the party won no seats and its vote dropped to 3.2%.

== 1962–1968, Mac Giolla takes control and the return to left-wing politics ==
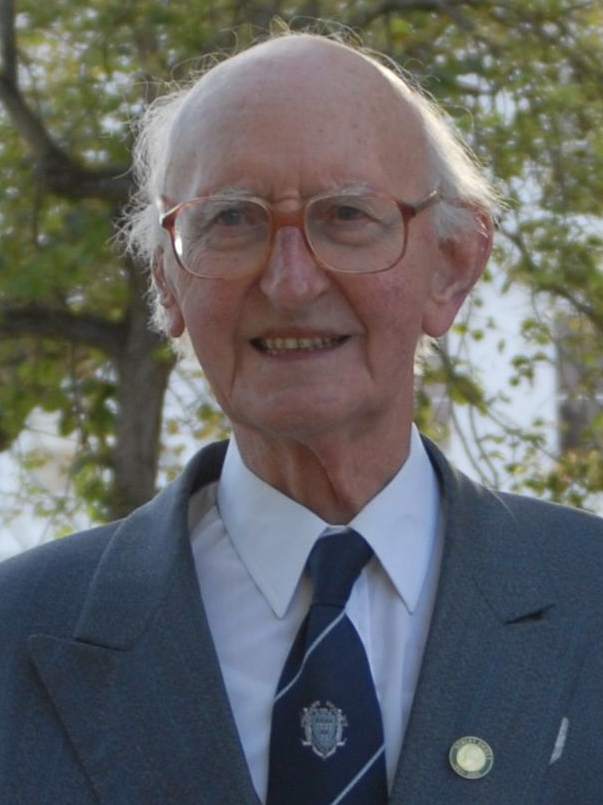
Tomás Mac Giolla took leadership of Sinn Féin in 1962 as part of a new guard of Irish Republicans who sought to take Sinn Féin back to the left after 20 years of pursuing a right-wing stance

Tomás Mac Giolla was elected president in 1962. His presidency marked a significant shift towards the left. The Wolfe Tone Directories were set up to encourage debate about policy. The directory attracted many left wing thinkers and people associated with the Communist Party of Ireland such as Roy Johnston. In his analysis, the primary obstacle to Irish unity was the continuing division between the Protestant and Catholic working classes. This they attributed to the 'divide and rule' policies of capitalism, whose interests a divided working class served. Military activity was seen as counterproductive since its effect was to further entrench the sectarian divisions. If the working classes could be united in class struggle to overthrow their common rulers, it was believed that a 32-county socialist republic would be the inevitable outcome.

The party became involved in the Dublin Housing Action Committee, protests against ground-rent landlordism, and in the co-operative movement. In one case Joe Clarke, a veteran of the Easter Rising, was ejected from a function commemorating the Rising, as he had interrupted (now President of Ireland) de Valera's speech with criticisms over Fianna Fáil's poor provision of housing. Sinn Féin, which ran under the label "Republican Clubs" in the North, became involved with the Northern Ireland Civil Rights Association, although it never controlled it as some unionists believed.

However abstentionism was also a dominant feature of debate. Although Sinn Féin had taken seats at council level since the 1950s, many people in the party were becoming in favour of abandoning the policy, while a significant number were still opposed to taking seats in "partitionist parliaments." Matters were not helped by a report from the Garland Commission, a committee led by Seán Garland to investigate and caucus opinion about abstentionism, which favoured ending the policy. Many were concerned about the downplaying of the role of the IRA. Opponents of the move would galvanise around Seán Mac Stíofáin, Seamus Twomey and Ruairí Ó Brádaigh.

== 1969–1974, the onset of the Troubles and the Official/Provisional split ==
There were parallel splits in the republican movement in the period 1969 to 1970; one in December 1969 in the IRA, and the other in Sinn Féin in January 1970.

The stated reason for the split in the IRA was "partition parliaments", however, the division was the product of discussions throughout the 1960s over the merits of political involvement as opposed to a purely military strategy. The political strategy of the leadership was to seek to unite the Protestant and Catholic working classes in class struggle against capitalism: it saw the sectarian troubles as fomented to divide and rule the working class. The split, when it finally did come, arose over the playing down of the role of the IRA and its inability to adequately defend the nationalist population in Northern Ireland in the violent beginning to the Troubles. One section of the Army Council wanted to go down a purely political (Marxist) road, and abandon armed struggle. Some writers allege that "IRA" had been dabbed on walls over the north and was used to disparage the IRA, by writing beside it, "I Ran Away". Those in favour of a purely military strategy accused the leadership of rigging both the Army Convention, held in December at Knockvicar House in Boyle, County Roscommon, and the vote on abandoning the policy of abstentionism and defence of nationalist areas.

Traditional republicans and opponents of abstentionism formed the "Provisional" Army Council in December 1969, after the split. Seán Mac Stiofáin, Dáithí Ó Conaill and Seamus Twomey and others established themselves as a "Provisional Army Council".

The split in the republican movement was completed at the Sinn Féin Ard Fheis on 10–11 January at the Intercontinental Hotel in Ballsbridge, Dublin, when the proposal to drop abstention was put before the members. The policy of abandoning abstentionism had to be passed by a two-thirds majority to change the party's constitution. Again, there were allegations of malpractice and that pro-Goulding supporters cast votes they were not entitled to. In addition, the leadership had also refused delegate status (voting rights) to a number of Sinn Féin cumainn (branches), particularly in the north and in County Kerry, where they knew them to be opposed. The motion was debated all of the second day, and when it was put to a vote at 5.30 p.m. the result was 153:104 in favour of the motion but failing to achieve the necessary two-thirds majority. The leadership then attempted to propose a motion in support of the (pro-Goulding) IRA Army Council, led by Tomás Mac Giolla. This motion would only have required a simple majority. As the (pro Goulding) IRA Army Council had already resolved to drop abstentionism, this was seen by the minority group (led by MacStiofain and Ó Brádaigh) as an attempt to subvert the party's constitution. They refused to vote and withdrew from the meeting. Anticipating this move by the leadership, they had already booked a hall in 44 Parnell Square, where they established a "caretaker executive" of Sinn Féin. The Caretaker Executive declared itself opposed to the ending of abstentionism, the drift towards "extreme forms of socialism", the failure of the leadership to defend the nationalist people of Belfast during the 1969 Northern Ireland riots, and the expulsion of traditional republicans by the leadership during the 1960s.

The leadership faction of the party was referred to as Sinn Féin (Gardiner Place) – the offices of Sinn Féin for many years – and the other as Sinn Féin (Kevin Street), the location of the opposing offices. Both Goulding's IRA faction and Mac Stíofáin's group called themselves the IRA. At the end of 1970 then, the terms 'Official IRA' and 'Regular IRA' were introduced by the press to differentiate Goulding's 'Officials' from Mac Stíofáin's 'Provisionals'. During 1971, the rival Sinn Féins played out their conflict in the press, with the Officials referring to their rivals as the "Provisional Alliance", while the Provisionals referred to the Officials (IRA and Sinn Féin) as the "NLF" (National Liberation Front). To add to the confusion both groups continued to call their respective political organisations in the North the "Republican Clubs".

With an intensification in the conflict the British government made a number of military decisions that had serious political consequences. The Falls Road Curfew would boost the "Provos" in Belfast, coupled with internment in August 1971 followed by Bloody Sunday in Derry in January 1972. These events produced an influx into the Provisionals on the military side, making them the dominant force and finally eclipsing the Officials everywhere while bringing hundreds into Ó Brádaigh's Sinn Féin. People began to flock to join the "Provos", as they were called, and in an effort to reassert its authority, the Goulding section began to call itself "Official IRA" and "Official Sinn Féin", but to no avail. Within two years the Provisionals had secured control, with the 'Officials' both North and South considered a 'discredited rump' and "regarded as a faction" by what was now the main body of the movement. Despite the dropping of the word 'provisional' at a convention of the IRA Army Council in September 1970, and becoming the dominant group, they are still known, "to the mild irritation of senior members" as Provisionals, Provos or Provies.

== 1975–1983 ==
Sinn Féin was given a concrete presence in the community when the IRA declared a ceasefire in 1975. 'Incident centres' were set up to communicate potential confrontations to the British authorities. They were manned by Sinn Féin, which had been legalised the year before by Secretary of State, Merlyn Rees. The party had launched its platform, Éire Nua (a New Ireland) at the 1971 Ard Fheis. In the words of Brian Feeney, "Ó Brádaigh would use Sinn Féin ard fheiseanna to announce republican policy, which was, in effect, IRA policy, namely that Britain should leave the North or the 'war' would continue".

After the ending of the truce another issue arose—that of political status for prisoners. Rees released the last of the internees but introduced the Diplock courts, and ended Special Category Status for all prisoners convicted after 1 March 1976. This led first to the blanket protest and then to the dirty protest . Around the same time, Gerry Adams began writing for Republican News, under the by-line "Brownie", calling for Sinn Féin to become more involved politically and to develop more left-wing policies . Over the next few years, Adams and those aligned with him would extend their influence throughout the republican movement and slowly marginalise Ó Brádaigh, part of a general trend of power in both Sinn Féin and the IRA shifting north. In particular, Ó'Brádaigh's part in the 1975 IRA ceasefire had damaged his reputation in the eyes of Ulster republicans.

The prisoners' protest climaxed with the 1981 hunger strike, during which striker Bobby Sands was elected Member of Parliament for Fermanagh and South Tyrone with the help of the Sinn Féin publicity machine. After his death on hunger strike, his seat was held, with an increased vote, by his election agent, Owen Carron, and two IRA volunteers were also elected to Dáil Éireann. These successes helped convince republicans that they should contest more elections. Danny Morrison expressed the mood at the 1981 Ard Fheis when he said:

"Who here really believes we can win the war through the ballot box? But will anyone here object if, with a ballot paper in this hand and an Armalite in the other, we take power in Ireland?". This was the origin of what became known as the Armalite and ballot box strategy. Éire Nua (seeking a federal United Ireland) was dropped in 1982, and the following year Ó Brádaigh stepped down as leader, to be replaced by Adams.

== 1983–1993 ==
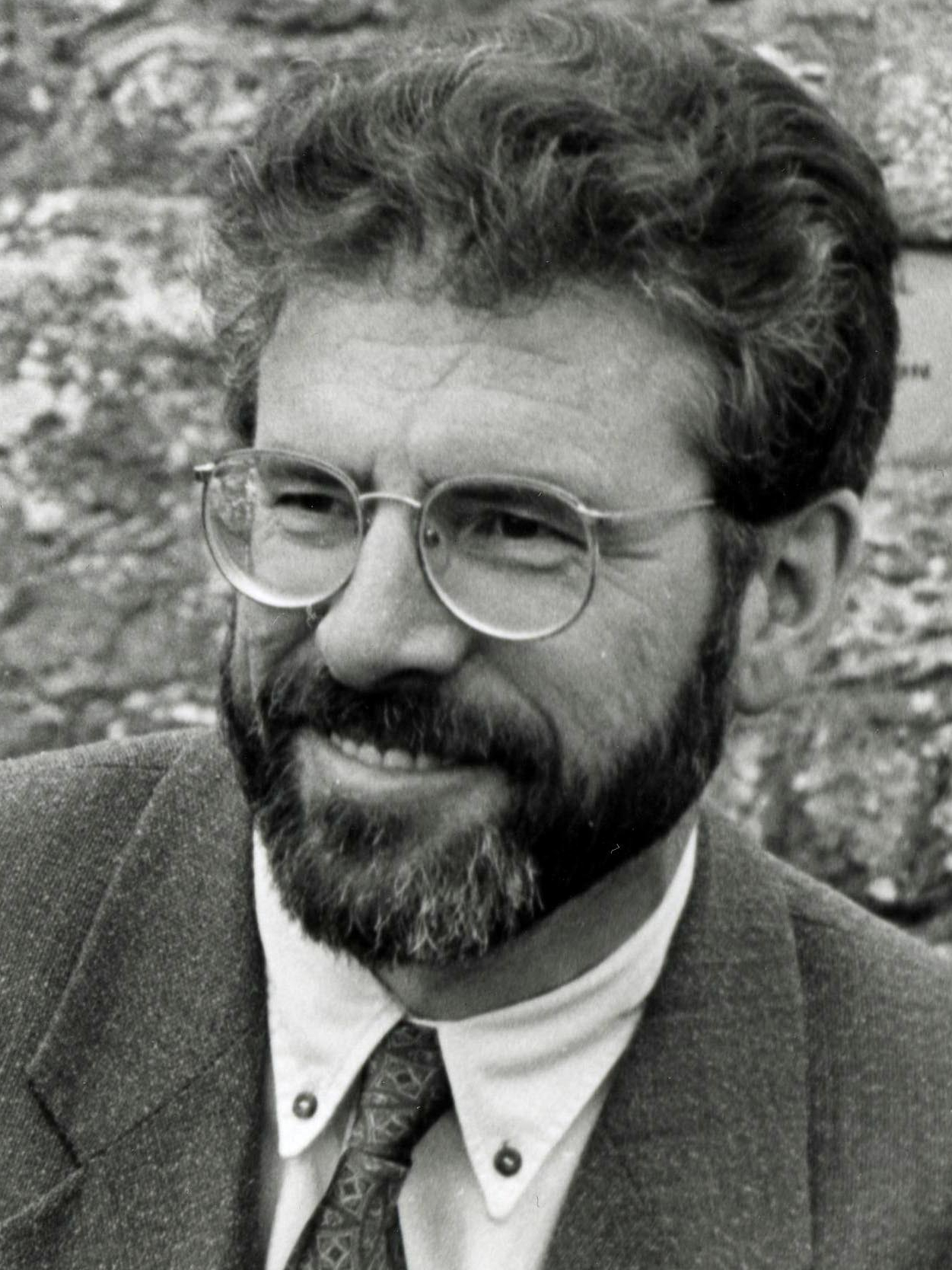
Gerry Adams, President of Sinn Féin from 1983 to 2018

Under Adams's leadership, electoral politics became increasingly important. In 1983 Alex Maskey was elected to Belfast City Council, the first Sinn Féin member to sit on that body. Sinn Féin polled over 100,000 votes in the Westminster elections that year, with Adams winning the West Belfast seat previously held by the Social Democratic and Labour Party (SDLP). In the 1985 local elections it won fifty-nine seats on seventeen of the twenty-six Northern Ireland councils, including seven on Belfast City Council.

The party began a reappraisal of the policy of abstention from the Dáil. At the 1983 Ard Fheis the constitution was amended to remove the ban on the discussion of abstentionism, so as to allow Sinn Féin to run a candidate in the forthcoming European elections, although in his address Adams said, "We are an abstentionist party. It is not my intention to advocate change in this situation."" A motion to permit entry into the Dáil was allowed at the 1985 Ard Fheis, but without the active support of the leadership, and Adams did not speak. The motion failed narrowly. By October of the following year an IRA Convention had indicated its support for elected Sinn Féin Teachtaí Dála (TDs) taking their seats. Thus, when the motion to end abstention was put to the Ard Fheis on 1 November 1986, it was clear that there would not be a split in the IRA as there had been in 1970. The motion was passed with a two-thirds majority. Ó Brádaigh and about twenty other delegates walked out, and re-convened in a Dublin hotel to form a new party, Republican Sinn Féin. Tom Maguire, the last surviving member of the Second Dáil, whose support had been of importance in the formation of the Provisional IRA, rejected the new policy and supported Republican Sinn Féin.

What would become known as the Northern Ireland peace process began in 1986 when Father Alec Reid, of the Clonard monastery in West Belfast, wrote to SDLP leader John Hume and to the Irish opposition leader Charles Haughey, to try to initiate direct talks between Sinn Féin and the other nationalist parties, north and south. On becoming Taoiseach in 1987, Haughey authorised face-to-face discussions between Martin Mansergh, Head of Research for Fianna Fáil, and Sinn Féin representatives Adams, Pat Doherty and Mitchel McLaughlin. Meetings between the SDLP and Sinn Féin began in January 1988 and continued during the year. Sinn Féin aimed at forming an alliance of Irish nationalist parties for the purpose of achieving self-determination for the whole of Ireland, but the SDLP insisted that this could only happen in the context of an end to IRA violence and the dropping of the demand for immediate British withdrawal. The talks broke up in September 1988 without any agreement being reached. In November 1991 Peter Brooke, the Secretary of State for Northern Ireland, announced multi-party talks involving the SDLP, Ulster Unionist Party, Democratic Unionist Party and Alliance Party. Sinn Féin was excluded from these talks; however, talks between John Hume and Gerry Adams resumed about this time, and led to the 'Hume-Adams' document of April 1993. This was the basis of the Downing Street Declaration, agreed between the British and Irish governments in December 1993.

== 1994–present ==
In 1994, the IRA announced a ceasefire, paving the way for Sinn Féin's involvement in the Northern Ireland peace process talks which eventually led to the Belfast Agreement and participation in the power-sharing Northern Ireland Executive. The Agreement saw Sinn Féin drop some long-held positions, e.g. on the viability of a Stormont government and the principle of consent. Many in Sinn Féin disagreed with its path and left the party, becoming known as dissident republicans. More left after the party agreed to support the Police Service of Northern Ireland in 2007. In February 2020, the NI leadership attended a PSNI campaign event to encourage more Catholics to join the Police Service, resulting in dissident threats towards the leadership.

Sinn Féin has increased electoral success, overtaking the SDLP to become the largest nationalist party in Northern Ireland in 2001, and securing the most votes in the 2020 Irish general election. In 2022, they secured the most votes and the most seats in the Northern Ireland Assembly, marking the first time an Irish nationalist party had ever done so.

== Leaders ==
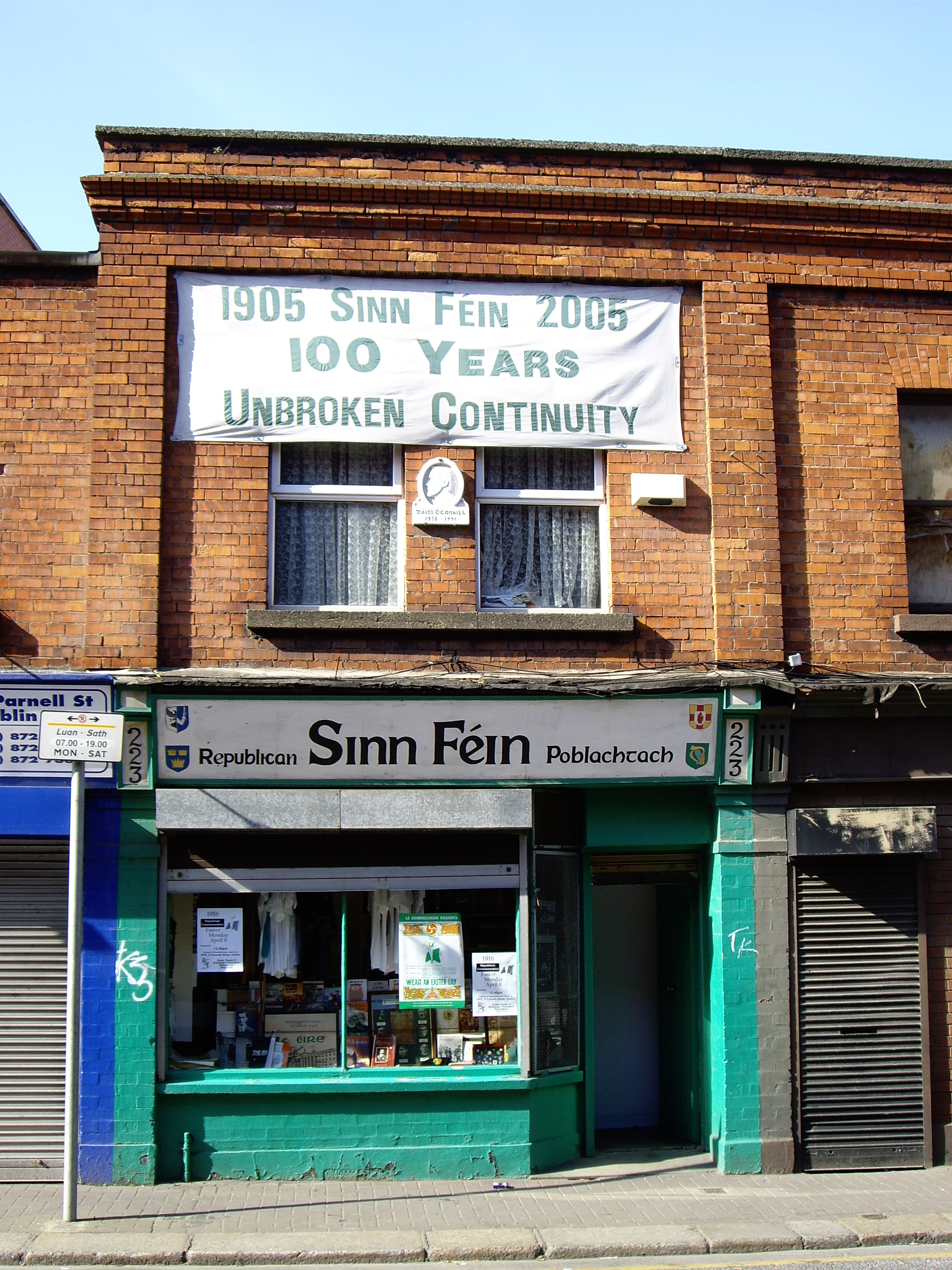
Headquarters of Republican Sinn Féin: Teach Dáithí Ó Conaill, 223 Parnell Street, Dublin

- Edward Martyn (1905–1908)
- John Sweetman (1908–1911)
- Arthur Griffith (1911–1917)
- Éamon de Valera (1917–1926)

In 1923, a substantial portion of the membership became Cumann na nGaedheal
In 1926, de Valera resigned from Sinn Féin and established Fianna Fáil

- John J. O'Kelly (Sceilg) (1926–1931)
- Brian O'Higgins (1931–1933)
- Fr. Michael O'Flanagan (1933–1935)
- Cathal Ó Murchadha (1935–1937)
- Margaret Buckley (1937–1950)
- Paddy McLogan (1950–1952)
- Tomás Ó Dubhghaill (1952–1954)
- Paddy McLogan (1954–1962)
- Tomás Mac Giolla (1962–1970)

In 1970, there was a split within the party, the resultant parties being referred to as
- Sinn Féin (Gardiner Place) also referred to by the media as Official Sinn Féin. Led by Tomás Mac Giolla. The party renamed itself Sinn Féin the Workers Party in 1977 and the Workers' Party in 1982.
- Sinn Féin (Kevin Street), also referred to by the media as Provisional Sinn Féin. By 1983 it was generally known simply as Sinn Féin. Despite the dropping of the word 'provisional' at a convention of the IRA Army Council in September 1970, and becoming the dominant group, they were still known, "to the mild irritation of senior members", as Provisionals, Provos or Provies.

- Ruairí Ó Brádaigh (1970–1983)

In 1986, Ó Brádaigh left and established Republican Sinn Féin.

- Gerry Adams (1983–2018)
- Mary Lou McDonald (2018–present)

In 2019, several members left to establish Aontú.

== Summary of splits and mergers ==
This is a summary of the splits and mergers from the initial Sinn Féin party and the IRA and their successors.

Summary of splits

Year	Event
1905	Sinn Féin Convention in November.
1907	Merged with Cumann na nGaedheal and the Dungannon Clubs.
1917	Reorganised after the Easter Rising.
1922	Pro-Treaty members left Sinn Féin to form Cumann na nGaedheal, and left the IRA to found the National Army and Garda Síochána.
1926	After a vote confirmed the Sinn Féin policy of abstention from Dáil Éireann, Éamon de Valera and his supporters left to form Fianna Fáil.
1933	Cumann na nGaedheal merged with the National Centre Party and the National Guard to form Fine Gael.
1969	Defenders of abstentionism left the IRA to form the Provisional Army Council; the group which remained became known as the 'Official' IRA.
1970	The split in the IRA was followed by a split in Sinn Féin: Sinn Féin (Gardiner Place) or 'Official' Sinn Féin, and Sinn Féin (Kevin Street) or 'Provisional' Sinn Féin.
1974	The Irish National Liberation Army (INLA) split from the 'Official' IRA with a corresponding split of the Irish Republican Socialist Party from 'Official' Sinn Féin.
1977	'Official' Sinn Féin is renamed Sinn Féin The Workers' Party.
1982	Sinn Féin The Workers' Party is renamed the Workers' Party.
1986	'Provisional' Sinn Féin (now commonly known simply as Sinn Féin) ends the policy of abstention from Dáil Éireann; opponents under Ruairí Ó Brádaigh left to form Republican Sinn Féin.
1987	'Provisional' Sinn Féin registers as a political party in the Republic of Ireland under the name 'Sinn Féin'.
1992	Leader of the Workers' Party, Proinsias De Rossa, left with six of their seven TDs. Later that year they formed Democratic Left.
1996	The Continuity IRA emerged as the paramilitary wing of Republican Sinn Féin.
1997	The 32 County Sovereignty Movement split from Sinn Féin in response to engagement in the Peace Talks, with the Real IRA as their paramilitary wing.
1999	Democratic Left merged with the Labour Party.
2019	Peadar Tóibín and several other members leave Sinn Féin and found Aontú, a centre-left pro-life party, in response to Sinn Féin's approval of the Health (Regulation of Termination of Pregnancy) Act 2018.

== Bibliography and references ==
=== Contemporary sources ===
- de Blácam, Aodh (1921). What Sinn Féin Stands For. Dublin: Mellifont Press.

=== Secondary sources ===
- Anderson, Brendan (2002). Joe Cahill: A Life in the IRA. Dublin: O'Brien Press. ISBN 0-86278-674-6.
- Bowyer Bell, J (1997). The Secret Army: The IRA (3rd ed.). Ireland: Poolbeg Press Ltd. ISBN 1-85371-813-0.
- Paul Bew & Gordon Gillespie, Northern Ireland: A Chronology of the Troubles 1968–1993, Gill & Macmillan, Dublin 1993, ISBN 0-7171-2081-3
- Coakley, J.; Gallagher, M. (1999). Politics in the Republic of Ireland (3rd ed.). London: Routledge.
- Coogan, Tim Pat (2000). The I.R.A. London: HarperCollins. ISBN 0-00-653155-5.
- Berresford Ellis, Peter (2004). Eyewitness to Irish History. Canada: John Wiley & Sons. ISBN 0-471-26633-7.
- Feeney, Brian (2002). Sinn Féin: A Hundred Turbulent Years. Dublin: The O'Brien Press. ISBN 0-86278-695-9.
- Ferriter, Diarmaid (2015). A Nation and not a Rabble: The Irish Revolutions 1913–1923.
- Ferriter, Diarmaid (2005). The Transformation of Ireland 1900–2000. London: Profile Books. ISBN 978-1-86197-443-3.
- Foster, R.F. (2015). Vivid Faces: The Revolutionary Generation in Ireland, 1890–1923.
- Gallagher, Michael (1985). Political parties in the Republic of Ireland. Manchester University Press ND. ISBN 978-0-7190-1742-1.
- Hanley, Brian; Millar, Scott (2009). The Lost Revolution: The Story of the Official IRA and the Workers' Party. Penguin Ireland. ISBN 978-1-84488-120-8.
- Kee, Robert (2005). Ireland: A History (Revised ed.). London: Abacus. ISBN 0-349-11676-8.
- Kelly, Jim (2013). "Sinn Féin: the Anti-Corruption Party?". History Ireland. 21 (5).
- Knirck, Jason (2014). Afterimage of the revolution: Cumann na nGaedheal and Irish politics, 1922–1932. U of Wisconsin Press.
- Mac Donncha, Mícheál, ed. (2005). Sinn Féin: A Century of Struggle. Dublin: Parnell Publications. ISBN 0-9542946-2-9.
- Murphy, Niall (2014). "'Social Sinn Féin and Hard Labour': the journalism of WP Ryan and Jim Larkin 1907–14". Irish Studies Review. 22 (1): 43–52. doi:10.1080/09670882.2013.871854.
- Noonan, Gerard (2014). The IRA in Britain, 1919-1923: 'in the Heart of Enemy Lines'. Liverpool University Press.
- O'Hegarty, P. S. (1952). A History of Ireland under the Union, 1801 to 1922. London: Methuen.
- Pašeta, Senia (2013). Irish Nationalist women, 1900–1918. Cambridge University Press.
- Shanahan, Timothy (2009). The Provisional Irish Republican Army and the Morality of Terrorism. Edinburgh: Edinburgh University Press. ISBN 978-0-7486-3530-6.

=== External links ===
- Sinn Féin online Umbrella website for Sinn Féin information.
