= President of Sinn Féin =

Irish political party leader

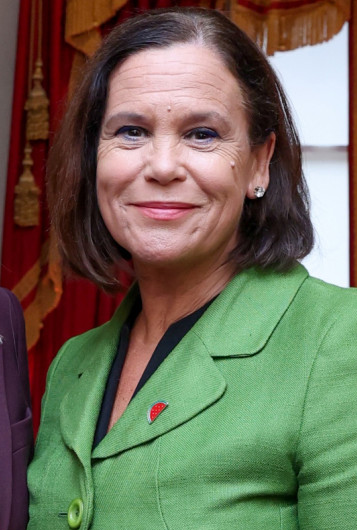
- Incumbent; Mary Lou McDonald since 10 February 2018
- Inaugural holder: Edward Martyn
- Formation: 28 November 1905
- Website: Mary Lou McDonald TD

The president of Sinn Féin (Irish: Uachtarán Shinn Féin) is the most senior politician within the Sinn Féin political party in Ireland. Since 10 February 2018, the office has been held by Mary Lou McDonald, following the decision of Gerry Adams to stand down as leader of the party and not seek re-election again. Unlike other political parties, the president of Sinn Féin does not have the power to dismiss or appoint their deputy and to dismiss or appoint parliamentary party members to front bench positions. These decisions are taken by the Ard Chomhairle (National Executive).

If the president is not a member of Dáil Éireann, then a TD is appointed in their place to act as the leader of the parliamentary party.

The vice president of Sinn Féin is Michelle O'Neill.

== Background ==
Although Sinn Féin was founded in 1905 by Arthur Griffith, Griffith did not initially take the presidency. Edward Martyn, a cultural activist and playwright, was elected president at the party's first annual convention on 28 November 1905. He was succeeded in 1908 by John Sweetman. Griffith served as vice president until he was finally elected president in 1911. At the Ard Fheis of 1917, which followed the Easter Rising, Griffith stepped down in favour of Éamon de Valera.

De Valera is the only one of the fifteen leaders to date to have been head of government while serving as leader. Griffith and de Valera were elected in the 1918 general election and were involved in the creation of the First Dáil. De Valera served as President of the Dáil and Griffith served first as Minister for Home Affairs, then as Minister for Foreign Affairs, and finally, following the Anglo-Irish Treaty, as President of the Dáil. De Valera, as an anti-Treaty republican, did not sit in the 3rd Dáil. He resigned from both the leadership and the party in 1926, when his motion to allow elected members to sit in the Dáil was defeated at the party's Ard Fheis. De Valera's successor John J. O'Kelly was one of four leaders who served for brief periods of time as Sinn Féin's party membership declined in favour of Fianna Fáil and Fine Gael.

In 1937, Margaret Buckley became the first female President of Sinn Féin. During her thirteen years as leader, she vastly improved the relations between the IRA and the party. She was succeeded by Paddy McLogan and Tomás Ó Dubhghaill who both helped rebuild party support in the aftermath of World War II. Tomás Mac Giolla became president in 1962 and served for over eight years as leader of the party. When the party split, Mac Giolla remained leader of Official Sinn Féin. Official Sinn Féin was later renamed the Workers' Party. Ruairí Ó Brádaigh was elected as the new leader of the Provisional Sinn Féin in 1970. Ó Brádaigh's presidency was shaped by relentless violence between republican and loyalist paramilitaries and the British security forces. He was one of the republican representatives which met with the British representatives in hope of ending the Troubles.

Ó Brádaigh resigned in 1983, due to dissatisfaction among party activists in Northern Ireland. Vice President Gerry Adams became the fourteenth President of the party in 1983. He became the longest serving president in the party's history. During his presidency, the IRA declared a ceasefire and the Good Friday Agreement was signed. Party support rose as Sinn Féin became the largest nationalist party in Northern Ireland. In 2011, Gerry Adams left the Northern Ireland Assembly and won a seat in Dáil Éireann. He was the first president since 1926 to also sit in Dáil Éireann. His successor, Mary Lou McDonald, also sits in Dáil Éireann.

== Presidents ==
=== 1905–1926 ===
No.	Name (Birth–death)	Portrait	Term of office		Comments
1	Edward Martyn (1859–1923)		1905	1908	
2	John Sweetman (1844–1936)		1908	1911	
3	Arthur Griffith (1872–1922)		1911	1917	President of Dáil Éireann (1922)
4	Éamon de Valera (1882–1975)		1917	1926	President of Dáil Éireann/President of the Irish Republic (1919–1922)

=== 1926–present ===
No.	Name (Birth–death)	Portrait	Term of office		Comments
5	John J. O'Kelly (1872–1957)		1926	1931	
6	Brian O'Higgins (1882–1963)		1931	1933	
7	Fr. Michael O'Flanagan (1876–1942)		1933	1935	
8	Cathal Ó Murchadha (1880–1958)		1935	1937	
9	Margaret Buckley (1879–1962)		1937	1950	First female leader of an Irish political party
10	Paddy McLogan (1899–1964)		1950	1952	
11	Tomás Ó Dubhghaill (1917–1962)		1952	1954	
(10)	Paddy McLogan (1899–1964)		1954	1962	
12	Tomás Mac Giolla (1924–2010)		1962	1970	Leader of Official Sinn Féin (later the Workers' Party) (1970–1988)
13	Ruairí Ó Brádaigh (1932–2013)		1970	1983	Leader of Republican Sinn Féin (1986–2009)
14	Gerry Adams (born 1948)		1983	2018	
15	Mary Lou McDonald (born 1969)		2018	Incumbent	First female Leader of the Opposition

== Vice presidents ==
Unlike other political party leaders, the president of Sinn Féin does not have the power to appoint or dismiss their deputy. The position is elected by members of the party at the Ardfheis. The vice-president has a seat on the Ard Chomhairle (National Executive) Officer Board.

=== 1905–1983 ===
President	Vice-president (Birth–death)	Portrait	Took office	Left office	Vice-president (Birth–death)	Portrait	Took office	Left office
Edward Martyn	Arthur Griffith (1872–1922)		1905	1911	John Sweetman (1844–1936)		1905	1908
Edward Martyn	Arthur Griffith (1872–1922)		1905	1911	Bulmer Hobson (1883–1969)		1908	1910
Edward Martyn	Arthur Griffith (1872–1922)		1905	1911	Thomas Kelly (1868–1942)		1910	Unknown
Arthur Griffith	Jennie Wyse Power (1858–1941)		1911	Unknown	Thomas Kelly (1868–1942)		1910	Unknown
Éamon de Valera	Fr. Michael O'Flanagan (1876–1942)		1917	1923	Arthur Griffith (1872–1922)		1917	1922
Éamon de Valera	Kathleen Lynn (1874–1955)		1923	1927	P. J. Ruttledge (1892–1952)		1923	1926
John J. O'Kelly	Mary MacSwiney (1872–1942)		1927	Unknown	John Madden (died 1954)		Unknown	
Brian O'Higgins	Mary MacSwiney (1872–1942)		1927	Unknown	Unknown			
Fr. Michael O'Flanagan	Margaret Buckley (1879–1962)		1933	1937	John J. O'Kelly (1872–1957)		1933	1934
Fr. Michael O'Flanagan	Margaret Buckley (1879–1962)		1933	1937	Liam Raul (died 1945)		1934	1935
Cathal Ó Murchadha	Margaret Buckley (1879–1962)		1933	1937	Liam Raul (died 1945) and Tom Maguire (1892–1993)		1935	1937
Margaret Buckley								
Margaret Buckley	Seamus Mitchell		1937	Unknown	Padraig de Paor		1937	Unknown
Margaret Buckley	Criostóir O'Neill		Unknown		Unknown			
Paddy McLogan	Tomás Ó Dubhghaill (1917–1962)		1950	1952	Michael Traynor (born 1917)		1950	1954
Tomás Ó Dubhghaill	Margaret Buckley (1879–1962)		1952	1960	Michael Traynor (born 1917)		1950	1954
Paddy McLogan	Margaret Buckley (1879–1962)		1952	1960	Tomás Ó Dubhghaill (1917–1962)		1954	1962
Paddy McLogan	Tony Magan (1911–1981)		1960	1962	Tomás Ó Dubhghaill (1917–1962)		1954	1962
Tomás Mac Giolla	Michael Traynor (born 1917)		1962		Rory O'Driscoll		1962	1963
Tomás Mac Giolla	Larry Grogan (1899–1979)		1962	1969	Rory O'Driscoll		1962	1963
Tomás Mac Giolla	Larry Grogan (1899–1979)		1962	1969	Seán Caughey (–2010)		1963	1965
Tomás Mac Giolla	Larry Grogan (1899–1979)		1962	1969	None (1965–1966)			
Tomás Mac Giolla	Larry Grogan (1899–1979)		1962	1969	Joe Clarke (1882–1976)		1966	1972
Tomás Mac Giolla	Cathal Goulding (1922–1998)		1969	1970	Joe Clarke (1882–1976)		1966	1972
Ruairí Ó Brádaigh	Larry Grogan (1899–1979)		1970	1971	Joe Clarke (1882–1976)		1966	1972
Ruairí Ó Brádaigh	Dáithí Ó Conaill (1938–1991)		1971	1978	Joe Clarke (1882–1976)		1966	1972
Ruairí Ó Brádaigh	Dáithí Ó Conaill (1938–1991)		1971	1978	Máire Drumm (1919–1976)		1972	1976
Ruairí Ó Brádaigh	Dáithí Ó Conaill (1938–1991)		1971	1978	Joe Cahill (1920–2004)		1976	1978
Ruairí Ó Brádaigh	Gerry Adams (born 1948)		1978	1983	Joe Cahill (1920–2004)		1976	1978
Ruairí Ó Brádaigh	Gerry Adams (born 1948)		1978	1983	Dáithí Ó Conaill (1938–1991)		1978	1983

=== 1983–present ===
Following the election of Gerry Adams as the 14th President of Sinn Féin, the position of co-vice presidents was removed. Instead, a single vice-president was elected at the 1983 Ard Fheis to serve in place of the two former vice-presidents.

President	Vice-president (Birth–death)	Portrait	Constituency	Term of office	
Gerry Adams	Phil Flynn (born 1940)		None	1983	1985
Gerry Adams	John Joe McGirl (1921–1988)		Councillor for Ballinamore (Leitrim County Council)	1985	1988
Gerry Adams	Pat Doherty (born 1945)		MLA for West Tyrone (1998–2012); MP for West Tyrone (2001–2017)	1988	2009
Gerry Adams	Mary Lou McDonald (born 1969)		MEP for Dublin (2004–2009); TD for Dublin Central (2011–present)	2009	2018
Mary Lou McDonald	Michelle O'Neill (born 1977)		MLA for Mid Ulster (2007–present)	2018	Incumbent

== Parliamentary party leaders ==
=== Leader in Dáil Éireann ===
Name of TD (Birth–Death)	Portrait	Constituency	Term of office		Elected (Dáil)
Caoimhghín Ó Caoláin (born 1953)		Cavan–Monaghan	26 June 1997	9 March 2011	1997 (28th)
Caoimhghín Ó Caoláin (born 1953)		Cavan–Monaghan	26 June 1997	9 March 2011	2002 (29th)
Caoimhghín Ó Caoláin (born 1953)		Cavan–Monaghan	26 June 1997	9 March 2011	2007 (30th)
Gerry Adams (born 1948)		Louth	9 March 2011	10 February 2018	2011 (31st)
Gerry Adams (born 1948)		Louth	9 March 2011	10 February 2018	2016 (32nd)
Mary Lou McDonald (born 1969)		Dublin Central	10 February 2018	Incumbent	2016 (32nd)
Mary Lou McDonald (born 1969)		Dublin Central	10 February 2018	Incumbent	2020 (33rd)
Mary Lou McDonald (born 1969)		Dublin Central	10 February 2018	Incumbent	2024 (34th)

=== Leader in Seanad Éireann ===
Name of Senator (Birth–Death)	Portrait	Constituency	Term of office		Elected (Seanad)
Pearse Doherty (born 1977)		Agricultural Panel	13 September 2007	26 November 2010	2007 (23rd)
None			26 November 2010	27 May 2011	2007 (23rd)
None			26 November 2010	27 May 2011	2011 (24th)
David Cullinane (born 1974)		Labour Panel	27 May 2011	27 February 2016	2011 (24th)
None			27 February 2016	13 May 2016	2011 (24th)
Rose Conway-Walsh (born 1969)		Agricultural Panel	13 May 2016	9 February 2020	2016 (25th)
None			9 February 2020	29 June 2020	2016 (25th)
Niall Ó Donnghaile (born 1985)		Administrative Panel	29 June 2020	22 January 2024	2020 (26th)
None			22 January 2024	12 February 2025	2020 (26th)
Conor Murphy (born 1963)		Industrial and Commercial Panel	12 February 2025	Incumbent	2025 (27th)

=== Leader in European Parliament ===
Name of MEP (Birth–Death)	Portrait	Constituency	Term of office		Elected (Parliament)
Mary Lou McDonald (born 1969)		Dublin	2004	2009	2004 (6th)
Bairbre de Brún (born 1954)		Northern Ireland	2009	3 May 2012	2009 (7th)
None			3 May 2012	12 June 2012	2009 (7th)
Martina Anderson (born 1962)		Northern Ireland	12 June 2012	31 January 2020	2009 (7th)
Martina Anderson (born 1962)		Northern Ireland	12 June 2012	31 January 2020	2014 (8th)
Martina Anderson (born 1962)		Northern Ireland	12 June 2012	31 January 2020	2019 (9th)
Matt Carthy (born 1977)		Midlands–North-West	31 January 2020	9 February 2020	2019 (9th)
None			9 February 2020	6 March 2020	2019 (9th)
Chris MacManus (born 1973)		Midlands–North-West	6 March 2020	17 July 2024	2019 (9th)
None			17 July 2024	present	2024 (10th)

== See also ==
- History of Sinn Féin
- Leader of Fianna Fáil
- Leader of Fine Gael
- Leader of the Labour Party
