= Michael Traynor (politician) =

Irish republican politician

Vice-President of Sinn Féin
- In office 1950–1954 Serving with: Tomás Ó Dubhghaill (1950-1952); Margaret Buckley (1952-1954)
- President: Paddy McLogan (1950-1952); Tomás Ó Dubhghaill (1952-1954)
- In office 1962–1962 Serving with Rory O'Driscoll
- President: Tomás Mac Giolla

Personal details
- Born: 1917 Belfast, Ireland
- Party: Sinn Féin (until 1962)

Military service
- Branch/service: Irish Republican Army
- Rank: Adjutant general
- Battles/wars: S-Plan

Michael Traynor (Irish: Miceal Treinfir; 1917 – fl. 1970) was a leading member of Sinn Féin in the 1950s and 1960s.

Born in Belfast in an area with a mix of Protestants and Catholics, at an early age, Traynor saw the dead bodies of three Irish Republican Army (IRA) members, all shot in the head. He joined the IRA himself in the 1930s, and served at least two spells in the Crumlin Road Prison, during which he undertook short hunger strikes. By 1938, when the S-Plan was carried out, he was member of its GHQ staff, and for a time, he served as Adjutant-General. Initially known as a bomb maker, alongside Tony D'Arcy, Jack McNeela and Dom Adams, he led agitation for the IRA in the south to lead guerilla raids on the north. When Tomás Ó Dubhghaill suggested raiding the Magazine Store in Phoenix Park, Traynor was his strongest supporter. This was successful, but soon after Traynor was arrested alongside other leading IRA figures while they were meeting at the Meath Hotel in Dublin. Held at Mountjoy Prison and sentenced to three months, Traynor took part in a hunger strike alongside D'Arcy and McNeela. However, after both D'Arcy and McNeela died on the strike, it was decided to abandon the protest, Stephen Hayes declaring that they had achieved their aims, although this turned out to be a fiction. In 1942, Traynor was again arrested and was interned in the Curragh; this time, he was kept inside until after the war.

In 1948, Traynor was a founder of the United Irishman newspaper, but he resigned the following year, in protest at what he believed was advocacy of force for its own sake. Also in 1948, while the IRA was focused on rebuilding its decimated organisation underground, Traynor was tasked with re-establishing Sinn Féin branches throughout the country.

In 1950, long-term Sinn Féin leader Margaret Buckley was replaced, and Traynor was elected as vice president, alongside Tomás Ó Dubhghaill. In this role, Traynor argued that the IRA should not control Sinn Féin, which should be a democratic body. With Paddy McLogan and Frank McGlynn, he drew up a new constitution for the organisation, and new policies on key issues. In 1951, he gave the main oration at the party's commemoration of the Easter Rising. He soon became General Secretary of Sinn Féin, serving alongside Maire Nic Gabhann, and he relocated to Dublin, where he ran a shop. He stood for the party in South Antrim at the 1955 UK general election, working full-time on the party's election campaign, but won only 9.3% of the votes cast. Speaking in Fermanagh during the campaign Traynor stated that Sinn Fein was a constitutional movement: "We are not asking Irish men and women to go out bearing arms for freedom; we are asking every man to do his duty to his neighbour, the Christian duty of seeing that they are well clothed and well housed."

Although initially critical of the Border Campaign of 1956, believing that the IRA was under-resourced, he accepted that it would happen. In 1957, much of the IRA leadership was arrested, and Traynor was part of a new emergency committee with Eamon Mac Thomais and McLogan which took over. However, later in the year, he was arrested while in the Republic of Ireland and again interned at the Curragh. He stood in South Antrim again at the 1959 UK general election, his vote falling to only 4.9%.

In 1962, Traynor was re-elected as Vice President of Sinn Féin, this time alongside Rory O'Driscoll, but he resigned from the party shortly afterwards, in objection to its support for an IRA motion stating that all its decisions must conform to those of the IRA. He played no further part in the movement, but was interviewed for Tim Pat Coogan's book The IRA, published in 1970.

Party political offices
Preceded by Criostóir O'Neill	Vice President of Sinn Féin with Tomás Ó Dubhghaill (1950–1952); Margaret Buckley (1952–1954); 1950–1954?	Succeeded by Tomás Ó Dubhghaill and Tony Magan
Preceded by Tomás Ó Dubhghaill and Tony Magan	Vice President of Sinn Féin with Rory O'Driscoll; 1962	Succeeded by Seán Caughey and Larry Grogan
