= Tomás Ó Dubhghaill =

Irish military and political activist (1917–1962)

President of Sinn Féin
- In office 1952–1954
- Preceded by: Paddy McLogan
- Succeeded by: Paddy McLogan

Vice President of Sinn Féin
- In office 1950–1952
- In office 1954–1962

Personal details
- Born: Thomas Doyle; 1917
- Died: 10 February 1962 (aged 44–45)
- Party: Sinn Féin

Military service
- Branch/service: Irish Republican Army

Tomás Ó Dubhghaill (Irish pronunciation: [ˈt̪ˠʊmˠaːsˠ oː ˈd̪ˠʊwəl̠ʲ]; born Thomas Doyle, nicknamed Tom; 1917 – 12 March 1962) was President of Sinn Féin from 1952 to 1954 and a Sinn Féin vice-president until his death.

== Background ==
Born in Drimnagh, Dublin, Doyle was educated at St James' Christian Brothers School in James's Street, Dublin. He left school at 16, and commenced employment as a clerk in the Department of Defence. He later obtained a diploma in social and economic science at University College Dublin.

== Member of the Irish Republican Army ==
Although a civil servant, Doyle became an Irish Republican Army activist.

Having devised the plan, in December 1939 he participated in the IRA's Dublin Brigade raid of the Irish Army Magazine Fort in the Phoenix Park, when the entire stock of the Irish Army's ammunition was seized, a quantity of just over one million rounds, and removed in a dozen lorries.

In 1940, he acted as adjutant general to Stephen Hayes, IRA chief of staff.

He was later interned for his activities, losing his position as a result. When he was released in December 1945, he became involved with the Republican Prisoners Release Association (RPRA), of which he was elected secretary in 1947, a position he held until the organisation was disbanded in 1952.

== Leadership roles in Sinn Féin ==
As part of the IRA's restructuring following World War II, the organisation resolved that they should add a political dimension to their previously strictly military only outlook. As part of this plan, they decided to infiltrate and take over Sinn Féin, which they were quickly able to do. By the late 1940s Sinn Féin was a shadow of its former heights, and it did not take long for the IRA to subjugate the party. Ó Dubhghaill was picked by the IRA to be one of those who would now publicly control Sinn Féin.

In 1948, he was elected secretary to the Sinn Féin Organising Committee and later became joint general secretary (along with Jim Russell) of Sinn Féin. In the same year, he joined the staff of the Workers' Union of Ireland.

Along with the RPRA committee, he was involved in the establishment of An Cumann Cabhrach (also known as the Republican Aid Committee) in 1953. He served as secretary of the organisation until his death in 1962.

At the 1951 Sinn Féin Ard Fheis, he was elected vice-president of the party. He was president from 1952 to 1954 and, vice-president again from 1956 to 1962.

In July 1957, along with the leadership of Sinn Féin, he was arrested and later interned in The Curragh.

In the 1957 Irish general election, Ó Dubhghaill stood unsuccessfully as a Sinn Féin candidate in the Dublin South-Central constituency, polling 1,734 first preferences (5.43 per cent of the valid poll). He was a candidate for the same party in the Dublin South-West by-election of 22 July 1959, when he polled 1,341 first preferences (5.37 per cent of the valid poll). His last electoral contest, again unsuccessful, was in the 1961 Irish general election, when he polled 622 votes or 1.94 percent of the valid poll.

He died in St Luke's Hospital on 12 March 1962 and was buried in Glasnevin Cemetery.

== Notes ==
Party political offices
Preceded by Margaret Buckley; Michael Traynor	Vice-President of Sinn Féin; 1954–1962; With: Margaret Buckley (1954–1960); Tony Magan (1960–1962)	Succeeded by Rory O'Driscoll; Michael Traynor
Preceded by Paddy McLogan	President of Sinn Féin; 1952–1954	Succeeded by Paddy McLogan
