= Máire Drumm =

Irish republican politician and military leader (1919-1976)

- Drumm during an interview with the BBC in 1976
- Born: Máire McAteer; 22 October 1919; Newry, Ireland
- Died: 28 October 1976 (aged 57); Belfast, Northern Ireland
- Cause of death: Assassination by gunshots
- Known for: Civil rights leader, public orator and figurehead of the republican movement
- Title: Vice-President of Sinn Féin
- Term: 1972–1976
- Political party: Sinn Féin
- Spouse: Jimmy Drumm (1946–her death)
- Children: Séamus, Seán, Margaret, Catherine and Máire

Máire Drumm (22 October 1919 – 28 October 1976) was the vice-president of Sinn Féin and a commander in Cumann na mBan. She was assassinated by Ulster loyalists while recovering from an eye operation in Belfast's Mater Hospital.

== Early life ==
Máire McAteer was born in Newry, County Down, to a staunchly Irish republican McAteer family, where she became the eldest of four siblings. Drumm's mother, Margaret McAteer (née Brown), had been active in the War of Independence and the Civil War. Drumm grew up in the village of Killeen, County Armagh, right on the border with County Louth. She played camogie for Killeen. The family moved to Dublin in 1940 and soon afterwards Drumm joined Sinn Féin. The family moved again to Liverpool and it was there Drumm joined the Gaelic League. The family returned to Northern Ireland in 1943 and Drumm took up work as a grocer's assistant in Belfast. It was at this point Drumm became an active participant in the Republican movement, taking a particular interest in the welfare of Republican prisoners. It was through this interest she met Jimmy Drumm, a long time Irish Republican who was interned in a Belfast prison, whom she married upon his release in 1947. Starting in the 1930s, Jimmy Drumm spent 13 years in prison for Republican activity including internment on the prison ship HMS Al Rawdah. At least nine of those years of imprisonment were served with no charge ever being filed. Her husband's imprisonment left Máire to do most of the raising of their four children. Despite her family circumstances, Drumm remained an active social figure. She became involved in the National Graves Association, an organisation dedicated to the maintenance of the gravesites and shrines to deceased Republicans. She was also involved in the Gaelic Athletic Association, working to promote the sport of Camogie.

== Political life ==
The onset of the Troubles in Northern Ireland severely ratcheted up the sectarian tensions in the region and forced dramatic responses from Republicans. Both the Irish Republican Army and Sinn Féin split into two parallel camps, the Official IRA and its political counterpart Official Sinn Féin, and the Provisional IRA and its political partner Provisional Sinn Féin. Drumm sided with the provisionals and was subsequently made a high-ranking member of that faction: She served on Ard Comhairle (supreme council) of Provisional Sinn Féin, later become a vice-president of the party. As the violence grew and many people became displaced by the Troubles, Drumm worked to rehouse those people in new areas.

In July 1970, Drumm has been credited as being amongst the women who "broke" the Falls Curfew after she helped organise 3,000 women from Andersonstown, where she lived, to march past the British army with prams loaded up with supplies for the residents. Unwilling to engage or halt unarmed women, the British Army gave up on the curfew.

As Vice-president of Sinn Féin, she often acted as a spokeswoman for the party in the media and was known for her abrasive rhetoric. She openly called for Catholics in Northern Ireland to join the IRA, and she was unafraid to threaten the Northern Irish and British governments with civil unrest as a result of their decisions. This culminated with her arrest for "seditious speech" in July 1971 when she told an audience in Belfast "You should not shout “Up the IRA”, you should join the IRA." Because of her subsequent prison sentence, In 1972 she was denied entry into the United States of America.

In August of 1976, she was once again imprisoned following a speech, this time at a rally in Dunville Park, West Belfast where she suggested the city would be destroyed "stone by stone" by Republicans unless republican prisoners were given Special Category Status. Her 18 days in prison left her health badly impaired.

== Death ==
Drumm's grave in Milltown Cemetery, Belfast

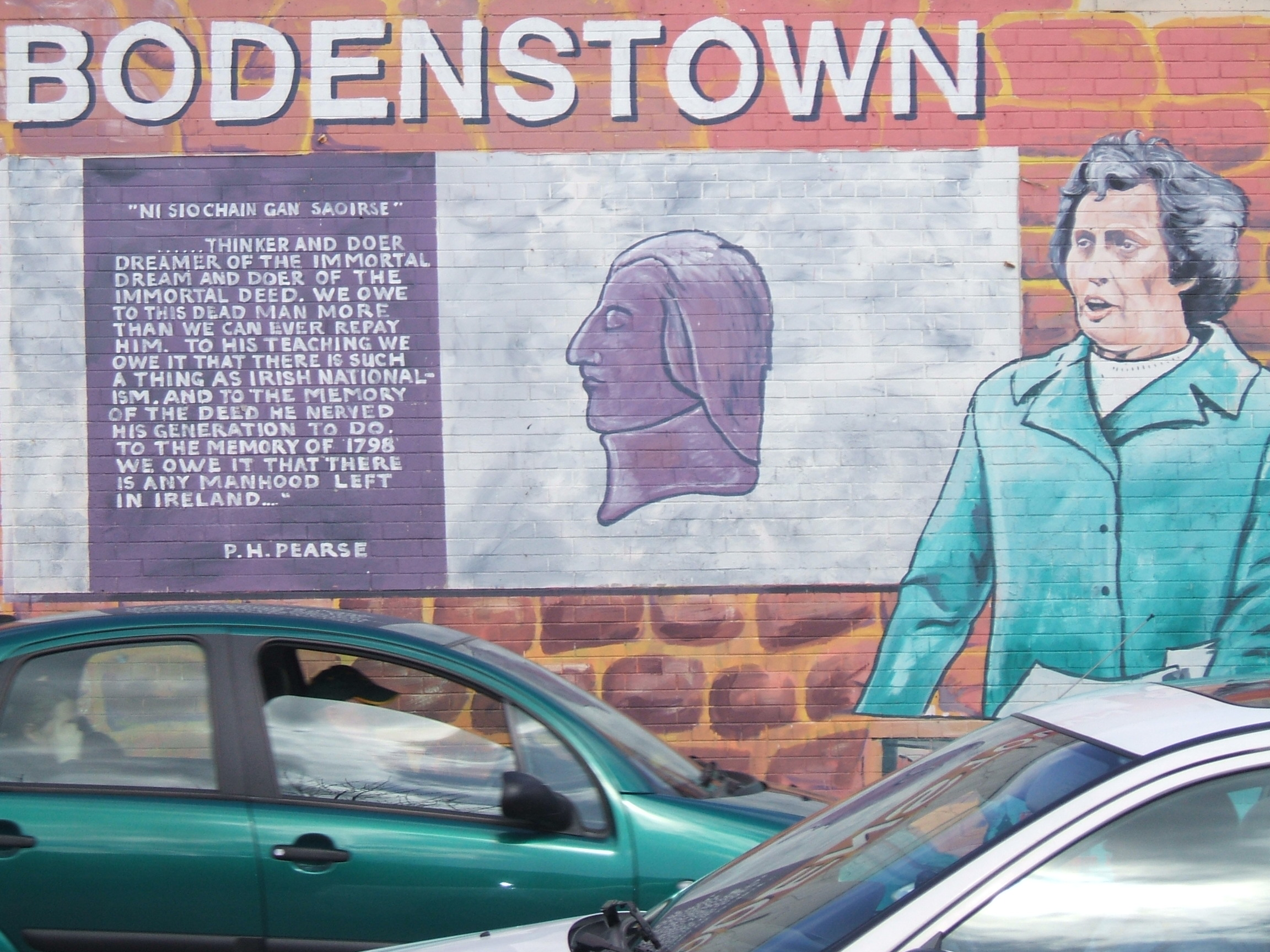
A mural in Belfast showing Drumm at Bodenstown

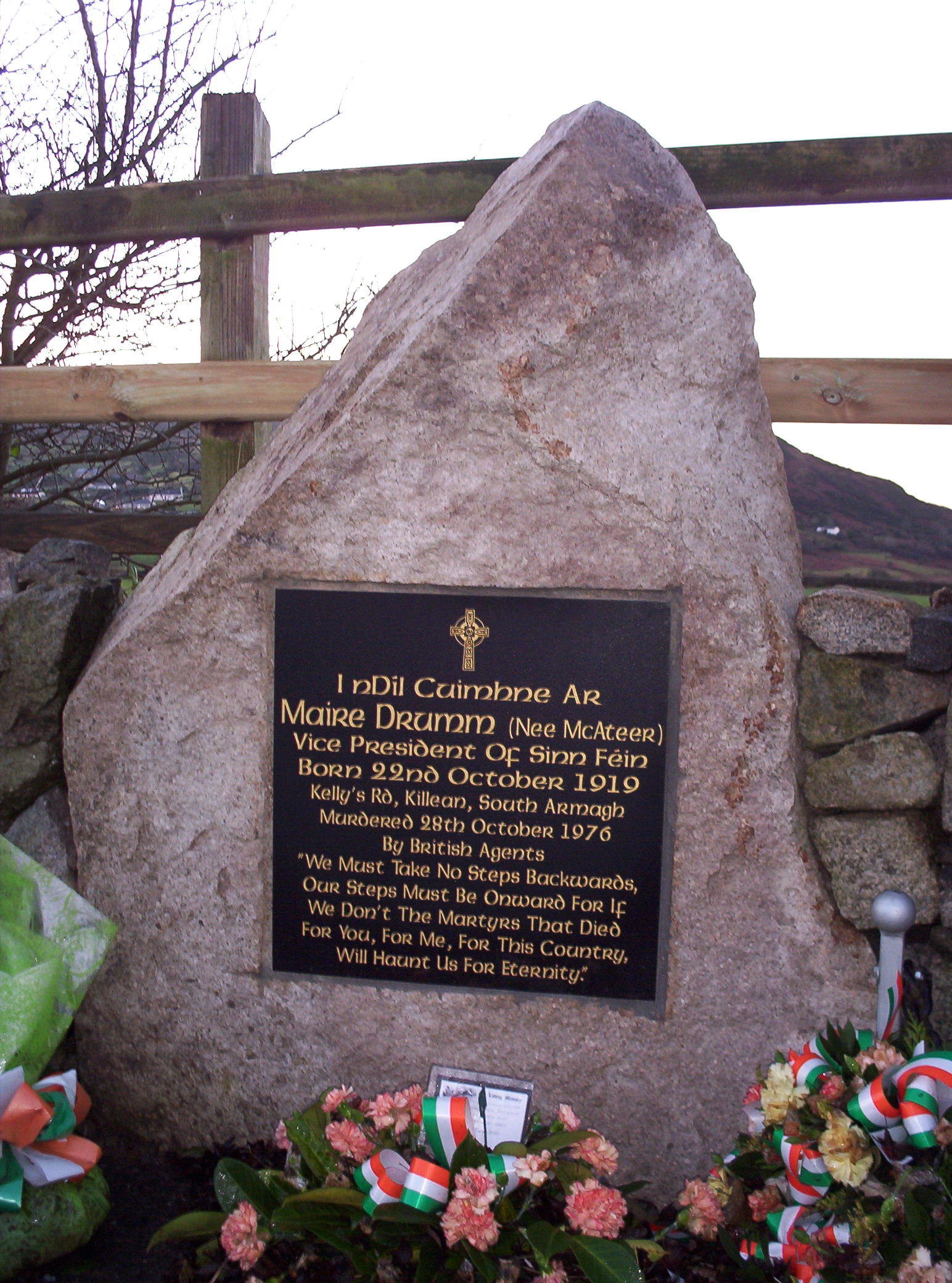
Drumm's memorial in Killean

In September 1976, Drumm entered the Mater Infirmorum Hospital for surgery on one of her eyes amid rumours that post-surgery, she would be departing Northern Ireland to take up residence in Dublin. On 18 October her husband announced that at the next Sinn Féin ard fheis, Drumm would be resigning from her position as vice president on the grounds of ill health, but that she promised to return when recovered.

On 28 October 1976, she was shot to death in her hospital bed by two members of the Red Hand Commando disguised as doctors. In the immediate aftermath, many questioned why her location had been so well publicised as well as criticising the lack of security around the hospital that allowed for her assassins to so easily enter her ward.

Over 30,000 people attended her funeral at Milltown cemetery, her coffin escorted by members of Cumann na mBan. The funeral drew a heavy presence from the British Army, who prevented Sinn Féin President Ruairí Ó Brádaigh and other leaders from attending. Amongst the mourners was actress Vanessa Redgrave, representing the Workers Revolutionary Party of Britain.

== Legacy ==
Republicans praised Drumm as a figurehead of their movement. Gerry Adams has held her up as an icon, penning a biography of her life entitled Máire Drumm: A Visionary: A Rebel Heart, as well as unveiling a portrait of Drumm hung in the Mayor's Parlour in Belfast City Hall in March 2020. Some Unionists suggested that Drumm was a victim of the violent rhetoric which she had sown, and was thus undone by her own hand. Merlyn Rees, a former Secretary of State for Northern Ireland, compared her with Charles Dickens's Madame Defarge, a fictional woman who calls for blood and death during the French Revolution. Ian Paisley described her as the "personification" of the Provisionals, meaning "sinister, bitter and violent".

== Quotes ==
Drumm's speeches and quotations can be found on murals across Northern Ireland. These include:

- "The only people worthy of freedom are those who are prepared to go out and fight for it every day, and die if necessary".
- "We must take no steps backward, our steps must be onward, for if we don't, the martyrs that died for you, for me, for this country will haunt us forever".

Party political offices
Preceded by Dáithí Ó Conaill; Joe Clarke	Vice-President of Sinn Féin; 1972–1976; With: Dáithí Ó Conaill	Succeeded by Dáithí Ó Conaill; Joe Cahill
