= Michael Traynor =

Michael Traynor may refer to:

- Michael Traynor (politician)
- Michael Traynor (actor)
