= Joe Clarke (Irish republican) =

Irish activist

- Clarke in 1966

Vice President of Sinn Féin
- In office 1966–1972
- Preceded by: Seán Caughey
- Succeeded by: Máire Drumm

Personal details
- Born: Joseph Clarke; 22 December 1882
- Died: 22 April 1976 (aged 93)
- Resting place: Glasnevin Cemetery
- Party: Sinn Féin

Military service
- Branch/service: Irish Republican Army; Anti-Treaty IRA
- Battles/wars: Easter Rising; Irish War of Independence

Joe Clarke (Irish: Seosamh Ó Clérigh, 22 December 1882 – 22 April 1976) was an Irish republican politician.

== Life ==
Born in Rush, County Dublin, Clarke worked for the Sinn Féin Bank, and was active in the 1916 Easter Rising. On the Wednesday of Easter week, 26 April, Clarke was one of 13 volunteers who held the Mount Street Bridge for nine hours against the overwhelming forces of the Sherwood Foresters Regiment of the British Army. When captured, he was shot in the head, but survived, and was instead imprisoned in Liverpool Prison, Wakefield Prison and then Frongoch internment camp.

On his return to Ireland, Clarke acted as the courier for the First Dáil and served as an usher at the first meeting of the First Dáil. He was interned from January 1921. Released in 1923, he acted as caretaker of the Sinn Féin headquarters on Harcourt Street, and founded the Irish Book Bureau. Although the Anti-Treaty Sinn Féin rejected participation in the Dáil, they continued to contest local elections, and Clarke sat on Dublin City Council.

Clarke was a founder member of Comhairle na Poblachta in 1929. In 1937, he worked with Brian O'Higgins to establish the Wolfe Tone Weekly as a light-hearted party newspaper. In August 1939, Clarke was interned at Arbour Hill, then later at Cork County Jail.

Clarke was elected as a vice-president of Sinn Féin in 1966. In the split of 1970, he supported the provisional wing, remaining vice-president. The Dublin South West Inner City cumann of Sinn Féin is named for Clarke.

Although Clarke had served under Éamon de Valera during the Easter Rising, the two became implacable opponents. In 1969, during the 50th anniversary commemoration of the First Dáil, Clarke interrupted proceedings in the Mansion House as President de Valera began his address. Declaring the event a "mockery", he drew attention to ongoing social issues, including hunger strikes in Mountjoy Prison and the housing situation. He was then removed from the building by ushers. The incident occurred amid wider protest and criticism surrounding the commemoration, particularly from housing activists such as the Dublin Housing Action Committee who argued that the social commitments of the Democratic Programme had not been fulfilled. Clarke vowed to outlive de Valera, he succeeded in this endeavour by outliving him a year.

Party political offices
Preceded by Seán Caughey; Larry Grogan	Vice President of Sinn Féin; 1966–1972; With: Larry Grogan (1966–1969); Cathal Goulding (1969–1970); Larry Grogan (1970–1971); Dáithí Ó Conaill (1971–1972)	Succeeded by Máire Drumm; Dáithí Ó Conaill
