= Seán Caughey =

Irish republican, later a monarchist and activist

Seán Caughey (Irish: Seán Mac Eachaidh) (died 18 July 2010) was an Irish republican, and later a monarchist and activist.

Based in Belfast, Caughey was the secretary of the local branch of the Gaelic League, He was the founding secretary of the Northern Ireland Council for Civil Liberties, on which he represented the "Six County Election Directorate".

In the late 1950s and early 1960s, he campaigned for the release of 166 internees in D-Wing of Crumlin Road Prison. He was then secretary of the Belfast Council for Civil Liberties.

Caughey was the most prominent Belfast-based member of Sinn Féin, then a banned organisation in the United Kingdom. Considered a member of the conservative wing of the movement, he was known for his advocacy of a "National Liberation Council" to unite various organisations and form a new governing body for Ireland, and the "Éire Nua" concept. He stood as an independent Republican in the 1964 general election in North Antrim, but took less than 10 percent of the vote.

Caughey was elected as a vice-president of Sinn Féin in the early 1960s, but he resigned in June 1965, after the organisation refused to change its policy of abstentionism, and would not recognise the government of the Republic of Ireland. Despite this, after the split of 1970, he rejoined the provisional wing of the party, and became an early editor of Republican News, but came into conflict with the party leadership. He was removed in 1975 and replaced by Danny Morrison. Sean Caughey was interned in Long Kesh 1971-1972. His wife and 10 children aged 1 to 17 endured extreme hardship during his time in Long Kesh. A life long Republican he later left Provisional Sinn Féin. In his final years, Caughey, under the Irish version of his name, was an advocate of re-establishing the Irish high kingship, as well as a "new Catholic Ireland".

Party political offices
Preceded by Rory O'Driscoll and Larry Grogan	Vice President of Sinn Féin with Larry Grogan; 1963?–1965	Succeeded by Larry Grogan and Joe Clarke
Media offices
Preceded by Leo Martin	Editor of Republican News; 1974–1975	Succeeded by Danny Morrison
