= Larry Grogan =

Irish activist

Larry Grogan (Irish: Labhras Ó Gruagáin; 1899–1979) was an Irish republican activist.

Born in Drogheda, Grogan joined the Irish Volunteers at the age of 18, which subsequently became part of the original Irish Republican Army (IRA). He was active in the Irish War of Independence, then in the Irish Civil War in the anti-treaty IRA. He was imprisoned in Mountjoy Prison in 1922, and was subsequently interned in the Curragh Camp, where he kept an autograph book, collecting signatures including that of Michael Hilliard.

Grogan remained an active republican, and was elected to the IRA Army Council in 1938. In this capacity, he signed the ultimatum to the British government declaring that, if major concessions were not made immediately, a Sabotage Campaign would be initiated. On 9 September 1939, he was arrested along with the majority of the IRA Army Council (Matty Tuite, Willy McGuiness, Paedar O'flaherty and Patrick McGrath) at 16 Rathmines Park, Dublin. Grogan was kept at Arbour Hill Prison. The following year, he was transferred to the Curragh, and assumed command of the IRA internees. He decided to organise them in an effort to improve conditions, and in December the group burnt down several wooden huts. This led to a clampdown, including solitary confinement and an incident in which soldiers fired on the inmates, killing one; Grogan was subsequently removed from the camp and given a prison term. Some of his time in gaol was spent with Brendan Behan, and the two remained friends, Behan often visiting Grogan after the war.

Grogan was released in March 1945, and immediately endorsed efforts to rebuild the IRA. By the end of the decade, he had been appointed IRA Quartermaster General. He voted to launch the Border Campaign in 1956, and was arrested and again interned in Mountjoy in January 1957. One year later, he was joined by his son. On this occasion, the internees were led by Dáithí Ó Conaill, but older leaders such as Grogan were regularly consulted. While in gaol, he contested Louth for Sinn Féin at the 1957 Irish general election, taking 9.6% of the first preference votes.

Released before the end of the decade, Grogan became increasingly associated with the conservative wing of the movement. He stood again in Louth at the 1961 Irish general election, managing only 4.5% of the vote, and became a vice-president of Sinn Féin in 1962, serving until 1969. In the split of 1970, Grogan supported the provisional wing, remaining on Sinn Féin's Ard Chomhairle.

Party political offices
Preceded by Rory O'Driscoll and Michael Traynor	Vice President of Sinn Féin with Rory O'Driscoll (1962–1963?); Seán Caughey (1963?–1965); Joe Clarke (1966–1969); 1962–1969	Succeeded by Cathal Goulding and Joe Clarke
Preceded by Cathal Goulding and Joe Clarke	Vice President of Sinn Féin with Joe Clarke; 1970–1971	Succeeded by Joe Clarke and Dáithí Ó Conaill
