= Tony Magan =

Irish republican (1910–1981)

Anthony Magan (15 December 1910 – 4 July 1981) was an Irish republican and chief of staff of the Irish Republican Army (IRA).

== Biography ==
Magan was born on 15 December 1910. He was a son of farmer James Magan and his wife Elizabeth Foley, of Kilmore, Dunshaughlin, County Meath.

Magan took part in the IRAs 1939-1940 sabotage/England Campaign (the S-Plan). The S-Plan was a campaign of bombing and sabotage against the civil, economic and military infrastructure of England. In London, Magan took classes in the construction of bombs to be used in the sabotage campaign. In February 1939 Magan was arrested in connection with bombing attacks in London's Underground subway system.

Magan was interned in the Curragh during the Irish Emergency (during the Second World War). In March 1946, he was arrested along with a number of other IRA men in the Ardee Bar, Dublin. Jailed, he was released in December 1946 along with Micksie Conway. Both men resumed their attempts to reorganise the IRA.

A lifelong bachelor and County Meath farmer, Magan sold his farm and devoted all his time and money to the IRA. He was appointed IRA chief of staff by the IRAs Army convention in September 1949. The IRA had almost been destroyed in the 1940s and Magan immediately set out to reorganise the political and military wings of the Republican Movement, namely the IRA and Sinn Féin, along with Michael Traynor, Paddy McLogan, and Tomás Mac Curtain.

Magan was not a popular choice for the position and several members of his previous IRA Army Council were not impressed by him but did not oppose his nomination outright. Magan drew support chiefly from Dublin delegates, who felt that "the Army needed a steel core and that Magan could supply it".

Magan was a determined physical force traditionalist. According to J. Bowyer Bell, he "wanted to create a new Army, untarnished by the dissent and scandals of the previous decade", with "no shadow of a gangster gunman, no taint of communism, but a band of volunteers solely dedicated to reuniting Ireland by physical force". Tim Pat Coogan describes him as "priest-like - who had given all his money, time and thought to the IRA, a deeply religious man of the old-guard school of Irish Catholicism [and] when he was again interned in the Curragh during the 1950s Border Campaign he organised a flourishing branch of the Legion of Mary".

At the 1950 Sinn Féin Ardfheis, Magan was elected honorary joint secretary of the party. Coogan recounts that Magan's Sinn Féin submitted key political and economic policies for review by friendly clergy, "to ensure that they contained nothing contrary to Catholic teaching". In May 1951, the IRA leadership established a Military Council to draft an overall plan for the Republican Movement as a whole. Its members were Magan (as Chief of Staff), Tomás Mac Curtáin (as chairman of the Army Council), Pádraig Mac Lógáin (as president of Sinn Féin and chairman of the IRA Army Executive), a former British army officer with World War II experience service who was an expert on guerrilla warfare, and one other person.

In 1953, Magan played a role in organising and carrying out the Felstead arms raid on July 25, 1953. This was an IRA arms raid on the Officers Training Corps School at Felstead in County Essex. In that raid, the IRA netted over 108 rifles, ten Bren and eight Stem guns, two mortars and dummy mortar bombs. Unlike Seán Mac Stiofáin, Cathal Goulding, and Manus Canning, later jailed for the raid, Magan evaded arrest and managed to return safely to Ireland.

Magan was chief of staff at the commencement of the IRA's Border Campaign, codenamed Operation Harvest, which began on 11 December 1956.

He resigned from the Republican Movement in 1962 in a dispute over the relationship between the IRA and Sinn Féin.

Magan, who lived at 45 Lower Dodder Road in Rathfarnham, Dublin, subsequently worked as a taxi driver. He died on 4 July 1981 at Meath Hospital. On 8 July 1981 he was buried in Mount Jerome Cemetery, Dublin. A lifelong bachelor, he was survived by his sisters, nieces and nephews.

== Sources ==
"Bodenstown: IRA GHQ reorganised", Saoirse, June 1997.

Party political offices
Preceded by Margaret Buckley and Tomás Ó Dubhghaill	Vice President of Sinn Féin with Tomás Ó Dubhghaill; 1954–1962	Succeeded by Rory O'Driscoll and Mick Traynor
