= Cathal Ó Murchadha =

Irish politician (1880–1958)

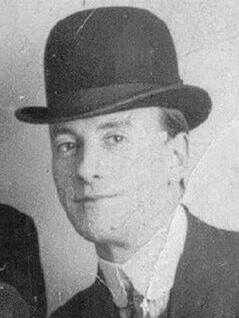
- Ó Murchadha, c.1910s

President of Sinn Féin
- In office 1935–1937
- Preceded by: Michael O'Flanagan
- Succeeded by: Margaret Buckley

Teachta Dála
- In office August 1923 – June 1927
- In office May 1921 – June 1922
- Constituency: Dublin South

Personal details
- Born: Charles Murphy; 16 February 1880 Dublin, Ireland
- Died: 28 April 1958 (aged 78) Dublin, Ireland
- Party: Sinn Féin
- Spouse: Nan Funge
- Children: 5
- Education: Christian Brothers School, Westland Row

Cathal Ó Murchadha (Irish pronunciation: [ˈkahəlˠ oː ˈmˠʊɾˠəxuː]; born Charles Murphy; 16 February 1880 – 28 April 1958) was an Irish politician and republican.

== Early life ==
He was born in 7 Albert Place East, Dublin, and was the third of 7 boys, he was the only one that married. His parents were Charles Murphy, a carpenter, and Mary Cullen.

He attended Westland Row Christian Brothers School, as very many future Irish republicans did, including Patrick and Willie Pearse.

After leaving school in 1897, he took up a career as a solicitor's clerk, an occupation that would train him well for the many administrative and financial positions he would take in the Republican movement.

As an adult he was very involved in St Andrew's Church in Westland Row and St Andrew's Catholic Club, at 4 Sandwith Street, which later moved to 144 Pearse Street. The location would become steeped in Republican history as it was the meeting place on Easter Monday for Ó Murchadha and his comrades in the 3rd battalion ahead of the Easter Rising.

== Republican activity ==
During the Rising, Ó Murchadha spent the week in Boland's Mill as second lieutenant to Commandant Éamon de Valera. In a 1927 issue of An tÓglach, Ó Murchadha is credited with persuading de Valera to reverse his decision to burn Westland Row Station, on the grounds that the fire might spread next door to St Andrew's Church and also to Westland Row CBS.

Ó Murchadha was interned in Frongoch internment camp after the Rising. He was manager of Arthur Griffith's newspaper Nationality and looked after it during Griffith's periods of imprisonment.

He was elected to the Second Dáil at the 1921 Irish elections as a Teachta Dála (TD) for the Dublin South constituency representing Sinn Féin.

Following the Treaty, he sided with the anti-Treaty side. He was imprisoned a number of times and took part in a hunger strike in Mountjoy Prison. He was officer commanding of the republican prisoners in Harepark Internment Camp, Curragh, County Kildare. from where he was transferred to Mountjoy during the hunger strike. He was the subject of questions in Dáil Éireann regarding his torture and ill-treatment by the Irish Army.

He lost his seat at the 1922 election, but was elected to the 4th Dáil at the 1923 general election, defeating Independent candidate Sir Andrew Beattie by 490 votes, but did not take his seat. He was defeated at the June 1927 general election. He was also an unsuccessful candidate at the 1927 Dublin South by-election.

He served as a Sinn Féin member on Dublin City Council. He was president of Sinn Féin from 1935 to 1937. He was one of the seven signatories of the document which purported to transfer the authority of the Second Dáil on 17 December 1938 to the Army Council of the IRA.

== Private life ==
He was married to Nan Funge of Courtown, County Wexford, and they had five children. His brother-in-law had founded the printing firm Elo Press. At the time of his death, on 28 April 1958, he was living at 217 South Circular Road, Dolphin's Barn, Dublin.

== Grandson's protest ==
On 26 May 2016, one of his grandsons, Brian Murphy, a member of the Irish Republican Prisoners Welfare Association, was wrestled by Canadian ambassador Kevin Vickers as he disrupted a commemoration of British soldiers killed in the Easter Rising at Grangegorman Military Cemetery in Dublin.

== See also ==
- Irish republican legitimatism
- List of members of the Oireachtas imprisoned during the Irish revolutionary period

Party political offices
Preceded by Michael O'Flanagan	President of Sinn Féin; 1935–1937	Succeeded by Margaret Buckley

Dáil	Election	Deputy (Party)	Deputy (Party)	Deputy (Party)	Deputy (Party)	Deputy (Party)	Deputy (Party)	Deputy (Party)
2nd	1921	Thomas Kelly (SF)	Daniel McCarthy (SF)	Constance Markievicz (SF)	Cathal Ó Murchadha (SF)	4 seats 1921–1923		
3rd	1922	Thomas Kelly (PT-SF)	Daniel McCarthy (PT-SF)	William O'Brien (Lab)	Myles Keogh (Ind.)	4 seats 1921–1923		
4th	1923	Philip Cosgrave (CnaG)	Daniel McCarthy (CnaG)	Constance Markievicz (Rep)	Myles Keogh (Ind.)	Cathal Ó Murchadha (Rep)	Michael Hayes (CnaG)	Peadar Doyle (CnaG)
4th	1923 by-election	Philip Cosgrave (CnaG)	Daniel McCarthy (CnaG)	Constance Markievicz (Rep)	Myles Keogh (Ind.)	Cathal Ó Murchadha (Rep)	Hugh Kennedy (CnaG)	Peadar Doyle (CnaG)
4th	March 1924 by-election	James O'Mara (CnaG)	Daniel McCarthy (CnaG)	Constance Markievicz (Rep)	Myles Keogh (Ind.)	Cathal Ó Murchadha (Rep)	Hugh Kennedy (CnaG)	Peadar Doyle (CnaG)
4th	November 1924 by-election	James O'Mara (CnaG)	Daniel McCarthy (CnaG)	Constance Markievicz (Rep)	Myles Keogh (Ind.)	Cathal Ó Murchadha (Rep)	Seán Lemass (SF)	Peadar Doyle (CnaG)
4th	1925 by-election	James O'Mara (CnaG)	Thomas Hennessy (CnaG)	Constance Markievicz (Rep)	Myles Keogh (Ind.)	Cathal Ó Murchadha (Rep)	Seán Lemass (SF)	Peadar Doyle (CnaG)
5th	1927 (Jun)	James Beckett (CnaG)	Vincent Rice (NL)	Constance Markievicz (FF)	Myles Keogh (Ind.)	Thomas Lawlor (Lab)	Seán Lemass (FF)	Peadar Doyle (CnaG)
5th	1927 by-election	James Beckett (CnaG)	Vincent Rice (NL)	Thomas Hennessy (CnaG)	Myles Keogh (Ind.)	Thomas Lawlor (Lab)	Seán Lemass (FF)	Peadar Doyle (CnaG)
6th	1927 (Sep)	James Beckett (CnaG)	Robert Briscoe (FF)	Thomas Hennessy (CnaG)	Myles Keogh (CnaG)	Frank Kerlin (FF)	Seán Lemass (FF)	Peadar Doyle (CnaG)
7th	1932	James Beckett (CnaG)	Robert Briscoe (FF)	Thomas Hennessy (CnaG)	Myles Keogh (CnaG)	James Lynch (FF)	Seán Lemass (FF)	Peadar Doyle (CnaG)
8th	1933	James Beckett (CnaG)	Robert Briscoe (FF)	James McGuire (CnaG)	Thomas Kelly (FF)	James Lynch (FF)	Seán Lemass (FF)	Peadar Doyle (CnaG)
9th	1937	Myles Keogh (FG)	Robert Briscoe (FF)	Thomas Lawlor (Lab)	Thomas Kelly (FF)	Joseph Hannigan (Ind.)	Seán Lemass (FF)	Peadar Doyle (FG)
10th	1938	James Beckett (FG)	Robert Briscoe (FF)	James Lynch (FF)	Thomas Kelly (FF)	Joseph Hannigan (Ind.)	Seán Lemass (FF)	Peadar Doyle (FG)
10th	1939 by-election	John McCann (FF)	Robert Briscoe (FF)	James Lynch (FF)	Thomas Kelly (FF)	Joseph Hannigan (Ind.)	Seán Lemass (FF)	Peadar Doyle (FG)
11th	1943	Maurice Dockrell (FG)	Robert Briscoe (FF)	James Lynch (FF)	James Larkin Jnr (Lab)	John McCann (FF)	Seán Lemass (FF)	Peadar Doyle (FG)
12th	1944	Maurice Dockrell (FG)	Robert Briscoe (FF)	James Lynch (FF)	James Larkin Jnr (Lab)	John McCann (FF)	Seán Lemass (FF)	Peadar Doyle (FG)
13th	1948	Constituency abolished. See Dublin South-Central, Dublin South-East and Dublin South-West.						

Dáil	Election	Deputy (Party)	Deputy (Party)	Deputy (Party)	Deputy (Party)	Deputy (Party)
22nd	1981	Niall Andrews (FF)	Séamus Brennan (FF)	Nuala Fennell (FG)	John Kelly (FG)	Alan Shatter (FG)
23rd	1982 (Feb)	Niall Andrews (FF)	Séamus Brennan (FF)	Nuala Fennell (FG)	John Kelly (FG)	Alan Shatter (FG)
24th	1982 (Nov)	Niall Andrews (FF)	Séamus Brennan (FF)	Nuala Fennell (FG)	John Kelly (FG)	Alan Shatter (FG)
25th	1987	Tom Kitt (FF)	Séamus Brennan (FF)	Anne Colley (PDs)	John Kelly (FG)	Alan Shatter (FG)
26th	1989	Tom Kitt (FF)	Séamus Brennan (FF)	Nuala Fennell (FG)	Roger Garland (GP)	Alan Shatter (FG)
27th	1992	Tom Kitt (FF)	Séamus Brennan (FF)	Liz O'Donnell (PDs)	Eithne FitzGerald (Lab)	Alan Shatter (FG)
28th	1997	Tom Kitt (FF)	Séamus Brennan (FF)	Liz O'Donnell (PDs)	Olivia Mitchell (FG)	Alan Shatter (FG)
29th	2002	Tom Kitt (FF)	Séamus Brennan (FF)	Liz O'Donnell (PDs)	Olivia Mitchell (FG)	Eamon Ryan (GP)
30th	2007	Tom Kitt (FF)	Séamus Brennan (FF)	Alan Shatter (FG)	Olivia Mitchell (FG)	Eamon Ryan (GP)
30th	2009 by-election	Tom Kitt (FF)	George Lee (FG)	Alan Shatter (FG)	Olivia Mitchell (FG)	Eamon Ryan (GP)
31st	2011	Shane Ross (Ind.)	Peter Mathews (FG)	Alan Shatter (FG)	Olivia Mitchell (FG)	Alex White (Lab)
32nd	2016	Constituency abolished. See Dublin Rathdown, Dublin South-West and Dún Laoghaire.				
