= Margaret Buckley =

Irish politician

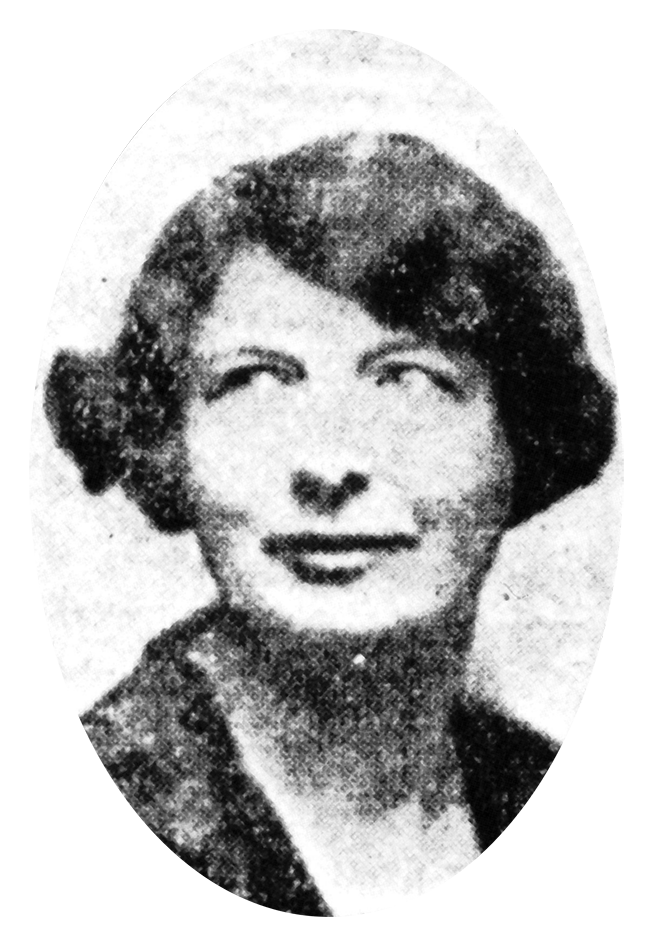

President of Sinn Féin
- In office 1937–1950
- Preceded by: Cathal Ó Murchadha
- Succeeded by: Paddy McLogan

Vice President of Sinn Féin
- In office 1933–1937
- In office 1952–1960

Personal details
- Born: 26 July 1879 Cork, Ireland
- Died: 24 July 1962 (aged 82–83)
- Resting place: St. Finbarr's Cemetery, Cork, Ireland
- Party: Sinn Féin
- Occupation: Trade unionist

Margaret Buckley (née Goulding; Irish: Maighréad Ní Ghabhláin Uí Bhuachalla; July 1879 – 24 July 1962) was an Irish republican, trade unionist and writer who served as president of Sinn Féin from 1937 to 1950. She was the first female leader of Sinn Féin and the first woman to lead a political party in Ireland.

An opponent of the Anglo-Irish Treaty, Buckley was interned during the Irish Civil War, during which she served as officer commanding the republican women prisoners in Kilmainham and led several hunger strikes against the conditions of her and her comrades' detention. Her account of that imprisonment, The Jangle of the Keys (1938), is regarded as the only published memoir by a female anti-Treaty prisoner and was reissued by Sinn Féin in 2022. As president of Sinn Féin she was the principal plaintiff in the Sinn Féin Funds case, an unsuccessful attempt to have the party recognised as the legal successor of the pre-1922 organisation and thus entitled to funds held in trust since the Civil War, a case that also produced a landmark Supreme Court ruling on the separation of powers.

Outside politics, Buckley spent four decades as an organiser with the Irish Women Workers' Union, and, writing under the pen name "Margaret Lee", was a persistent critic of the 1937 Constitution, which she said treated Irish women "as if they were half-wits".

== Early life ==
Buckley was born in July 1879 at Winter's Hill, Cork, the eldest daughter of James Goulding and his wife Ellen. Sources differ slightly on the exact date, with some giving 26 July and others 28 July 1879. Her father worked as a labourer at the time of her birth, and later as a railway porter and then a railway inspector; the family were supporters of Parnell. As a young woman Buckley trained and worked as a teacher on the northside of Cork city.

Buckley was active in Cork's musical and cultural circles, taking part in local choral and operatic societies and in the Gaelic League. She became politically active through the Terence MacSwiney-founded Celtic Literary Society, which she joined in 1901, and was a founding member of An Dún, a theatre and meeting hall on Queen Street that became a centre for nationalist gatherings in Cork. She joined the Cork branch of Inghinidhe na hÉireann, serving first as assistant honorary secretary and later as branch president, and by 1902 was one of only a handful of such branch leaders in the country. As an Inghinidhe activist she campaigned for the establishment of an Irish Industrial Development Society, and took part in protests against the visit of Edward VII to Cork in 1903.

In June 1906 she married Patrick Buckley, a Cork-born civil servant employed by the Inland Revenue and Customs, and the couple set up home in Howth, County Dublin. It was in Dublin that she first became involved in the trade union movement, and her politics grew more radical during the 1913 Dublin Lock-out. Patrick's health deteriorated as a result of tuberculosis, and following his death Margaret moved to a house on Marguerite Road, Glasnevin, Dublin. She later returned to Cork for a period to care for her elderly father.

As secretary of the Irish branch of the Women's Federation, Buckley sought to see the union distance itself from its British roots while retaining independence from the male-dominated Irish unions, and in 1919 opened talks with the Irish Women Workers' Union (IWWU). This resulted in her appointment as an IWWU official with responsibility for the semi-autonomous Domestic Workers' Union; in 1920 she opened its offices on North Great George's Street and campaigned for "good wages, fair conditions, to secure good service". She worked to remove the "skivvy" and "slave labour" stigma attached to domestic service, writing that the relationship between "mistress" and worker was "only an accident, or perhaps the result of a system which makes one woman a mistress and the other a maid". She would remain active in the trade union movement for four decades, retiring as an official only in the late 1950s.

== Revolutionary activity ==
=== War of Independence ===
Accounts differ as to when Buckley joined Sinn Féin: one source places her in a Dublin branch of the party from around 1914, while another records that she was in Cork at Easter 1916 and joined only after the Easter Rising, becoming an active member of the Michael O'Hanrahan cumann in north Dublin. Arrested in the aftermath of the Rising, she was released in the amnesty of June 1917 and played a prominent role in the reorganisation of Sinn Féin. By 1925 she was prominent enough within the party to speak at that year's Ard Fheis, where, responding to concerns that Sinn Féin was losing support for want of a clear social and economic policy, she stressed that rank-and-file republicans wanted to know how their lives would actually be different under a republican government.

She was involved in the War of Independence in Cork. After the death of her father, she returned to Dublin. In 1920, she was appointed a Dáil Court (also known as Republican Courts) judge in the North City circuit, serving alongside Kathleen Clarke and Jennie Wyse Power and earning praise from Austin Stack, the Minister for Home Affairs of the Irish Republic, for her administration of the court; she also served as its treasurer.

=== Civil War and imprisonment ===
Buckley opposed the Anglo-Irish Treaty and allowed her home and trade union office to be used by the anti-Treaty side. She was arrested in January 1923 and interned in Mountjoy, later transferred to the North Dublin Union and Kilmainham, where she went on hunger strike. She was released in October 1923, having spent roughly nine months in custody. During her imprisonment, she was elected Officer Commanding (OC) of the republican prisoners in Mountjoy, Quartermaster (QM) in the North Dublin Union, and OC of B-Wing in Kilmainham. She was an active member of the Women Prisoners' Defence League, founded by Maud Gonne and Charlotte Despard in 1922, though her own writing suggests she also had a hand in its establishment.

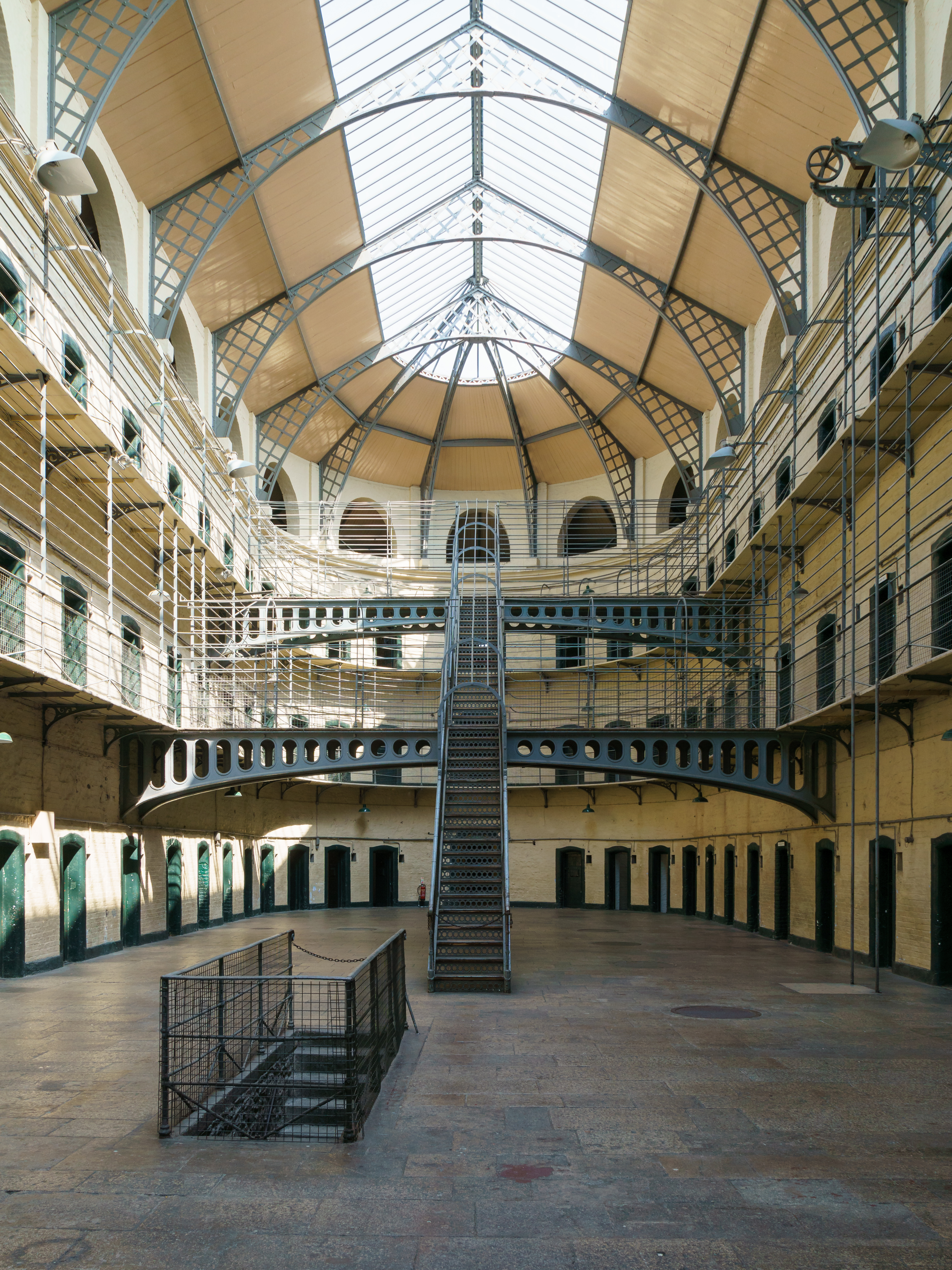
The interior of Kilmainham Jail, where Buckley was imprisoned alongside other anti-treaty women

As OC in Kilmainham, Buckley organised her comrades along lines close to a Cumann na mBan military hierarchy, running daily classes in reading, writing and arithmetic as well as Irish language and history, knitting and needlework, and helped stage a historical pageant to relieve the monotony of prison life. She refused a demand from deputy governor Paudeen O'Keeffe that the women clean the prison's stairs and corridors, on the grounds that this would cast them as "charwomen" rather than political prisoners. Younger prisoners in Kilmainham attempted to dig an escape tunnel, a feat that left Buckley amazed at what "those girls with no tools, with bare hands, and strength of purpose, could accomplish".

Food and furniture became recurring points of conflict with the prison administration, and when negotiations broke down Buckley and her fellow internees resorted to hunger strike, which she later described as "the only weapon we could wield", used because they felt "justified in using it" as women "deprived of the common necessities which are accorded to the most depraved criminal", and inspired by the example of Thomas Ashe, who had died on hunger strike in the same jail in 1917. As spokeswoman for the prisoners, Buckley developed a heart condition after seven days without food; the ensuing negotiations restored the women's food parcels and beds. During the strikes, a prison chaplain refused to hear the women's confessions, a policy Buckley condemned as a betrayal of duty "as ordained by God". She later insinuated, without stating it outright, that fellow prisoner Eithne Coyle may have faced the threat of sexual violence from drunken guards before going on hunger strike for "more human conditions".

Her memoir also recorded lighter moments among her fellow internees, including how Madame Bannard Cogley, a well-known figure in Dublin's musical circles, entertained her husband Fred with song, usually in French, when he appeared at the prison steps each morning.

==== The Jangle of the Keys ====
In 1938, Buckley published The Jangle of the Keys, an account of the experiences of Irish republican women prisoners interned by the Irish Free State. The literary scholar Claire Dubois has described the book as a testimony to the physical and psychological brutality faced by republican women during the Civil War, arguing that it offers "a subversive narrative of the Civil War" that goes against the official silence imposed on women deemed deviant for their activism, and functions, in the terms of the philosopher Jacques Rancière, as a "dissensus" that renders visible what had previously been silenced. Dubois has also characterised the memoir as "a call to continued action", noting that its closing words are "Long live the Republic".

The book documents specific episodes of violence, including a search of the women's wing at Kilmainham in 1923 during which Buckley witnessed Máire Comerford having her hair cut and her head stitched, and Sighle Humphreys dragged from her cell half-conscious, prompting Buckley to threaten a searcher who approached her. She later expressed shame at what she called her "primitive impulse" and "unladylike" conduct in that moment, a reaction the scholar Louise Ryan has linked to contemporary anxieties, shared by many republican women, about being seen as respectable in a period of moral policing by both the Free State and the Catholic Church.

Síobhra Aiken, writing in the Journal of War & Culture Studies, has called The Jangle of the Keys "the only published memoir of an anti-Treaty female prisoner", noting that comparable accounts by women such as Máire Comerford, Eithne Coyle and Hannah Moynihan were never published, and that others, such as Constance Markievicz's prison letters and Kathleen Clarke's memoir, appeared only posthumously. The book was out of print for decades before being reissued by Sinn Féin in 2022 with a foreword by the party's then president, Mary Lou McDonald, as part of the Decade of Centenaries commemorations.

Buckley continued to write about prison conditions after her release, addressing the plight of ordinary, non-political detainees under her pen name Margaret Lee, including in a 1927 newspaper article asking whether the state's prisons were "worthwhile". In 1956, her Short History of Sinn Féin was published.

== President of Sinn Féin ==
At the October 1934 Sinn Féin Ard Fheis, Buckley was elected one of the party's vice-presidents. Three years later, in 1937, she succeeded Cathal Ó Murchadha, a former TD of the second Dáil Éireann, as President of Sinn Féin, at an ardfheis attended by only forty delegates, making her the first Irishwoman to lead a political party. When she assumed the leadership, the party was not supported by the Irish Republican Army (IRA), which had severed its links with Sinn Féin in 1925; by the time she left office in 1950, relations with the IRA had been resolved, and the IRA subsequently took direct control of the party. Historian Séan Ó Duibhir has noted that although her election was a historic first, it brought no immediate electoral gains, and by 1940 the party had become so marginal that the Irish authorities largely ignored it, even as republicans elsewhere were being interned over fears of collusion with Nazi Germany.

She was a vocal critic of the government of the day. In 1938, she published The Jangle of the Keys. In 1937, in her opposition to Éamon de Valera's redrafted Constitution of Ireland, she said that were she "dealing with the Constitution" she would have "something to say about de Valera's treating the women of the country as ... half-wits", a remark repeated in later years both by herself and by commentators discussing her career. Under her presidency in the 1940s, Sinn Féin's activities were largely confined to commemorations, lectures and its annual Ard Fheis, and one of its main visible activities was running free Irish-language classes at its Dublin headquarters. Buckley remained a forceful public speaker, describing Ireland's 1946 application to join the United Nations as "seeking admission to join a thieves' kitchen", and accused Valera of announcing "a Republic from English dictionaries and encyclopaedias" while holding him responsible for executions during the Civil War that had left, in her words, "an indelible stain" on his government.

=== Sinn Féin funds case ===
As President she began the lawsuit Buckley v. Attorney-General, the Sinn Féin Funds case, in which the party sought unsuccessfully to be recognised as owners of money raised by Sinn Féin before 1922 and held in trust in the High Court since 1924. The sum in dispute, originally around £8,610 when lodged in 1924, had grown through accrued interest to roughly £24,000 by the 1940s. In January 1942, Sinn Féin's Standing Committee authorised Buckley, as president, along with vice-presidents Seamus Mitchell and Seamus O'Neill and nine other party officials, to act as plaintiffs, and a summons was issued against the Attorney General and the executor of the late treasurer Jennie Wyse Power.

When de Valera's government attempted to resolve the matter by legislation in 1947, Sinn Féin challenged the constitutionality of the resulting Sinn Féin Funds Act; the Supreme Court found the Act unconstitutional as an unwarranted interference by the Oireachtas in the operation of the courts, a decision still cited as a landmark in Irish constitutional law on the separation of powers. The substantive case was heard in the High Court over two months from April 1948, with witnesses including former Sinn Féin presidents de Valera and John J. O'Kelly ("Sceilg"). Giving evidence, Buckley told the court that the money involved "is not of prime importance to us", and that "establishing the continuity of our organisation comes first with us, not the money. We do not care about it". On 26 October 1948, Judge Kingsmill Moore ruled that although the Sinn Féin of 1948 was the lawful continuation of the organisation reconstituted in 1923, that reorganisation had not been carried out in accordance with the party's own rules, so there was no proven legal continuity back to the pre-Civil War Sinn Féin that had originally raised the funds, and the claim failed. The case, and its loss, prompted Sinn Féin to amend its constitution to bar the party from using the courts of "either partition assembly" for civil actions.

=== Final years as president ===
At the 1950 Ard Fheis, Buckley gave her last presidential address, having decided not to stand for re-election. She told delegates that Sinn Féin "had always drawn our inspiration from past history and the day when Ireland forgets the past, she will have ceased to be a nation", and that "the fundamental principles of Sinn Féin remain unaltered, for though historical circumstances may change, principles never change". A substantial part of the address addressed the ongoing problem of Irish emigration, which she described in terms reflecting the conservative nationalist rhetoric of the period, warning that the "chief export" of the country was now "young women and men". Paddy McLogan succeeded her as president, a change that, according to historian Agnès Maillot, made explicit the IRA's growing control of the party.

== Later life and death ==
Buckley served as honorary vice-president of Sinn Féin from 1950 until her death in 1962, and was the only member of the ardchomhairle of the party not to be arrested during a Garda raid in July 1957. She remained active in Sinn Féin affairs and in trade union work into her late seventies, retiring from her IWWU role only in the late 1950s. Throughout this period she continued to write on social justice issues, and her assessment of the 1937 Constitution as one that treated women "as half-wits" remained a touchstone of her public reputation.

Buckley died on 24 July 1962 at her home on Marguerite Road, Glasnevin, Dublin, and, in keeping with her wishes, was buried in St. Finbarr's Cemetery, Cork, with full honours rendered by Sinn Féin.

== Legacy ==
Buckley's status as the first woman to lead an Irish political party has continued to be noted in Irish public life. Marking the anniversary of her death in 2020, the Irish Examiner observed that Sinn Féin still had a female president, Mary Lou McDonald, and drew a parallel with Catherine Connolly's election that year as the Dáil's first female Leas Cheann Comhairle, describing both as markers of "how much further" Irish politics still had to go on gender representation.

== Sources ==
- "Margaret Buckley, president of Sinn Féin", Saoirse Irish Freedom, July 1998.
- Clarke, Frances, "Buckley (Goulding), Margaret ('Maggie'; 'Margaret Lee')", Dictionary of Irish Biography, Royal Irish Academy, October 2009.
- Dubois, Claire, "Margaret Buckley's The Jangle of the Keys, A Call to Continued Action", Études irlandaises, 49-2, 2024, p. 95-108.
- Maillot, Agnès, In the Shadow of History: Sinn Féin, 1926-70, Manchester University Press, 2015.

Party political offices
Preceded by Mary MacSwiney; John Madden	Vice President of Sinn Féin; 1933–1935?	Succeeded by ?
Preceded by Cathal Ó Murchadha	President of Sinn Féin; 1937–1950	Succeeded by Paddy McLogan
Preceded by Criostóir O'Neill	Vice President of Sinn Féin; 1950–1952; With: Michael Traynor	Succeeded by Tomás Ó Dubhghaill; Michael Traynor
Preceded by Tomás Ó Dubhghaill; Michael Traynor	Vice President of Sinn Féin; 1954–1960; With: Tomás Ó Dubhghaill	Succeeded by Tomás Ó Dubhghaill; Tony Magan
