= Liam Raul =

Irish politician (died 1945)

Laurence Raul (died 28 November 1945) was an Irish republican politician.

Raul joined Sinn Féin in 1916, and soon became a prominent figure in Dublin, one of the first Sinn Féin members elected to Dublin City Council. He took the anti-treaty side during the Irish Civil War. By 1922, he was Chairman of the council's Electric Lighting Committee, when he was arrested and interned.

In the 1930s, Raul elected as the secretary of Sinn Féin, then served as one of its Vice Presidents from late 1933 until 1937.
