= Éire Nua =

1970s–1980s proposal for a federal United Ireland

Provinces of Ireland

Éire Nua, or "New Ireland", was a proposal supported by the Provisional Irish Republican Army and Sinn Féin during the 1970s and early 1980s for a federal United Ireland. The proposal was particularly associated with the Dublin-based leadership group centred on Ruairí Ó Brádaigh and Dáithí Ó Conaill, who were the authors of the policy.

Éire Nua is still supported by the Continuity Irish Republican Army, Republican Sinn Féin, Na Fianna Éireann, and Cumann na mBan.

== Ideology ==
Éire Nua envisaged an all-Ireland republic that would be created after Northern Ireland was no longer part of the United Kingdom. It also involved the dissolution of the existing Republic of Ireland, which many republicans considered an illegitimate entity due to not encompassing all of Ireland. Under Éire Nua, Ireland would become a federal state with parliaments for each of its four historic provinces, as well as a central parliament based in Athlone.

The purpose of the federal structure was twofold. Firstly, it was intended to show unionists in Northern Ireland that they would have a degree of self-government in a united Ireland. This would be achieved by the provision of a parliament, Dáil Uladh, for Ulster. However, by including all of historic Ulster—nine counties instead of the six in Northern Ireland—it was intended that the unionist majority would be slim enough to prevent abuses against the Catholic nationalist population in the province.

Secondly, the federal parliaments were intended to redress the economic imbalance between the eastern and western parts of Ireland, and was hoped to enable prosperity in the poorer west of the country.

== Irish reactions and decline in popularity ==
Many members of Sinn Féin, particularly in Northern Ireland, objected to Éire Nua on the grounds that it would perpetuate the dominance of Protestant unionists in the north of the country. Despite this, Éire Nua committees were established at least in Ulster and Connacht, largely due to the efforts of Desmond Fennell and Emmett O'Connell. Nevertheless, the scheme was dismissed as unworkable by some influential Republicans. When Northern Republicans grouped around Gerry Adams gained control of the IRA and Sinn Féin in the late 1970s, they attacked the policy. In 1982, the Sinn Féin Ard Fheis voted to drop the policy, and the following year all reference to it in the Sinn Féin Constitution and rules was removed, and it was removed as the policy of the Republican movement in favour of the creation of a unitary Irish Republic.

Ó Brádaigh and his supporters walked out of the 1986 Ard Fheis after a motion was passed that ended the Republican policy of abstentionism to the Oireachtas and reconvened the Ard Fheis at the West County Hotel in the village of Chapelizod just west of Dublin. Henceforth referring to itself as Republican Sinn Féin to distinguish itself from former associates, the party still advocates the Éire Nua agenda.

== Foreign reactions ==
=== United States ===
The reaction of the US administration to Éire Nua was mixed. Due in large part to Irish-American pressure at home, a synopsis of Éire Nua was entered into the Congressional Record as a solution that "merits consideration" to the crisis in Ireland. Officials in Ireland were less optimistic, placing more hope in the Sunningdale Agreement.

== See also ==
- Home Rule All Round
