= Paddy McLogan =

Northern Irish politician

- Pádraig Mac Lógáin

President of Sinn Féin
- In office 1950–1952
- Vice President: Tomás Ó Dubhghaill; Michael Traynor
- Preceded by: Margaret Buckley
- Succeeded by: Tomás Ó Dubhghaill
- In office 1954–1962
- Vice President: Margaret Buckley (until 1960) Tony Magan (from 1960) Tomás Ó Dubhghaill
- Preceded by: Tomás Ó Dubhghaill
- Succeeded by: Tomás Mac Giolla

Member of Parliament of Northern Ireland for South Armagh
- In office 1933–1938
- Preceded by: Joe Connellan
- Succeeded by: Paddy Agnew

Personal details
- Born: 1899 Markethill, United Kingdom of Great Britain and Ireland
- Died: July 1964 (aged 64–65) Blanchardstown, Republic of Ireland
- Party: Sinn Féin

Paddy J. McLogan (Irish: Pádraig Mac Lógáin) (1899 – 21/22 July 1964) was President of Sinn Féin from 1950–52 and again from 1954 to 1962.

== Biography ==
Born in Markethill, County Armagh, he spent some time in Scotland. He joined the Irish Republican Brotherhood in 1913 and the Irish Volunteers. The same year he was imprisoned by the British authorities and went on a hunger strike in 1917 with Thomas Ashe. He was in command of the Irish Republican Army in South Armagh during the Irish War of Independence.

After the Irish Civil War, he settled in Portlaoise and became a publican. In 1923 McLogan was chosen to be one of principal organizers of what remained of the anti-treaty IRA. From 1933 to 1938 he was an abstentionist Republican Member of Parliament for South Armagh constituency of the Parliament of Northern Ireland.

He chaired the 1934 IRA Army Convention. In 1936, the IRA set up Cumann Poblachta na hÉireann, with McLogan as chairman and one of many Sinn Féin members of the party.

He was interned from 1940 to 1941. In 1945 he chaired the first IRA Army Convention after the war.

In 1950 he succeeded Margaret Buckley as President of Sinn Féin, until 1952, and resumed that role in 1954 and was to remain in the post until 1962, when he resigned from the party. He was regarded as helping to rebuild the party after World War II. Around this time, he also owned a public house on Main Street in Portlaoise, County Laois, which is now known as the one and only "Ryan's". A plaque commemorates his former proprietorship.

He died on 20 or 21 July 1964, at his home at 11 Herbert Road, Blanchardstown, County Dublin, as a result of an accident involving a 9mm Walther pistol.

Parliament of Northern Ireland
Preceded by Joseph Connellan	MP for South Armagh; 1933–1938	Succeeded by Patrick Agnew
Party political offices
Preceded by Margaret Buckley	President of Sinn Féin; 1950–1952	Succeeded by Tomás Ó Dubhghaill
Preceded by Tomás Ó Dubhghaill	President of Sinn Féin; 1954–1962	Succeeded by Tomás Mac Giolla
