= Dáithí Ó Conaill =

Irish republican politician and military leader (1938–1991)

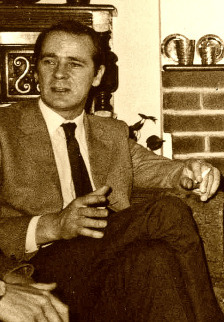
- Ó Conaill in 1974

Chief of Staff of the Continuity Irish Republican Army
- In office 1986–1991

Vice President of Sinn Féin
- In office 1978–1983
- Preceded by: Joe Cahill
- Succeeded by: Gerry Adams

Vice President of Republican Sinn Féin

Personal details
- Born: David O'Connell; May 1938 County Cork, Ireland
- Died: 1 January 1991 (aged 52) Dublin, Ireland
- Party: Republican Sinn Féin
- Other political affiliations: Sinn Féin
- Spouse: Deirdre Caffrey
- Children: 3
- Occupation: Political activist

Military service
- Branch/service: Provisional Irish Republican Army; Continuity Irish Republican Army
- Battles/wars: Border Campaign; The Troubles

Dáithí Ó Conaill (English: David O'Connell; May 1938 – 1 January 1991) was an Irish republican, a member of the IRA Army Council of the Provisional IRA, and vice-president of Sinn Féin and Republican Sinn Féin. He was also the first chief of staff of the Continuity IRA, from its founding in 1986 until his death in 1991. He is recognised as introducing the car bomb to Northern Ireland.

== Joins IRA ==
Ó Conaill was born in Cork in 1938. His uncle Michael O'Sullivan, a member of the 1st Cork Brigade of the Irish Republican Army, was killed by the Black and Tans on 23 March 1921 during the Irish War of Independence. After his vocational school education, he trained as a woodwork teacher in a college in County Wexford. He joined the republican movement at 17 years of age and took part in the IRA Border Campaign. On 1 January 1957 he was second-in-command of the Pearse Column which carried out the raid on Brookeborough Royal Ulster Constabulary (RUC) Barracks in County Fermanagh, in which Seán South and Fergal O'Hanlon were killed. He was arrested by the Garda Síochána and imprisoned in Mountjoy Prison for six months. Upon release, he was interned in the Curragh. On 27 September 1958 he escaped along with Ruairí Ó Brádaigh and went on the run.

With most of the IRA leadership under arrest or interned, Ó Brádaigh (who had been on the Army Council at the start of the campaign) became IRA chief of staff and Ó Conaill became IRA Director of Operations and joined the IRA Army Council.

In an altercation with the RUC and B Specials near Lough Neagh in 1959, he was shot and badly injured and later captured by the RUC. On recovery he received an eight-year sentence and remained in Belfast Prison until he was released unconditionally in September 1963.

In the October 1961 Irish general election, Ó Conaill ran as a Sinn Féin candidate in the Cork Borough constituency. Winning 1,956 first preference votes (a share of 5.24 per cent), he just missed taking the fifth and final seat.

Upon release, Ó Conaill took up residence in Glencolmcille, County Donegal, where he taught. He also married Deirdre Caffrey, Ruairí Ó Brádaigh's cousin. He had a son (Feargal) and two daughters (Ciara and Díóg) with Deirdre. Ó Conaill worked closely with Fr. James McDyer who was active in rural development. During the late 1960s, Ó Conaill played little part in the activities of the IRA or Sinn Féin.

With the outbreak of the Troubles in Northern Ireland in the late 1960s, Ó Conaill would become a prominent spokesperson for the Provisional IRA. He was active in the IRA through the 1960s, and IRA Chief of Staff Cathal Goulding appointed him the Officer Commanding (O/C) of the Donegal unit prior to the IRA's Convention in December 1969; Ó Conaill was also a member of the IRA's Army Council after Goulding expanded that body at the IRA Convention late in 1968. In the autumn of 1969, Ó Conaill, upset with the IRA leadership, walked out of the "unit convention" and was suspended.

== Sides with Provisional IRA ==
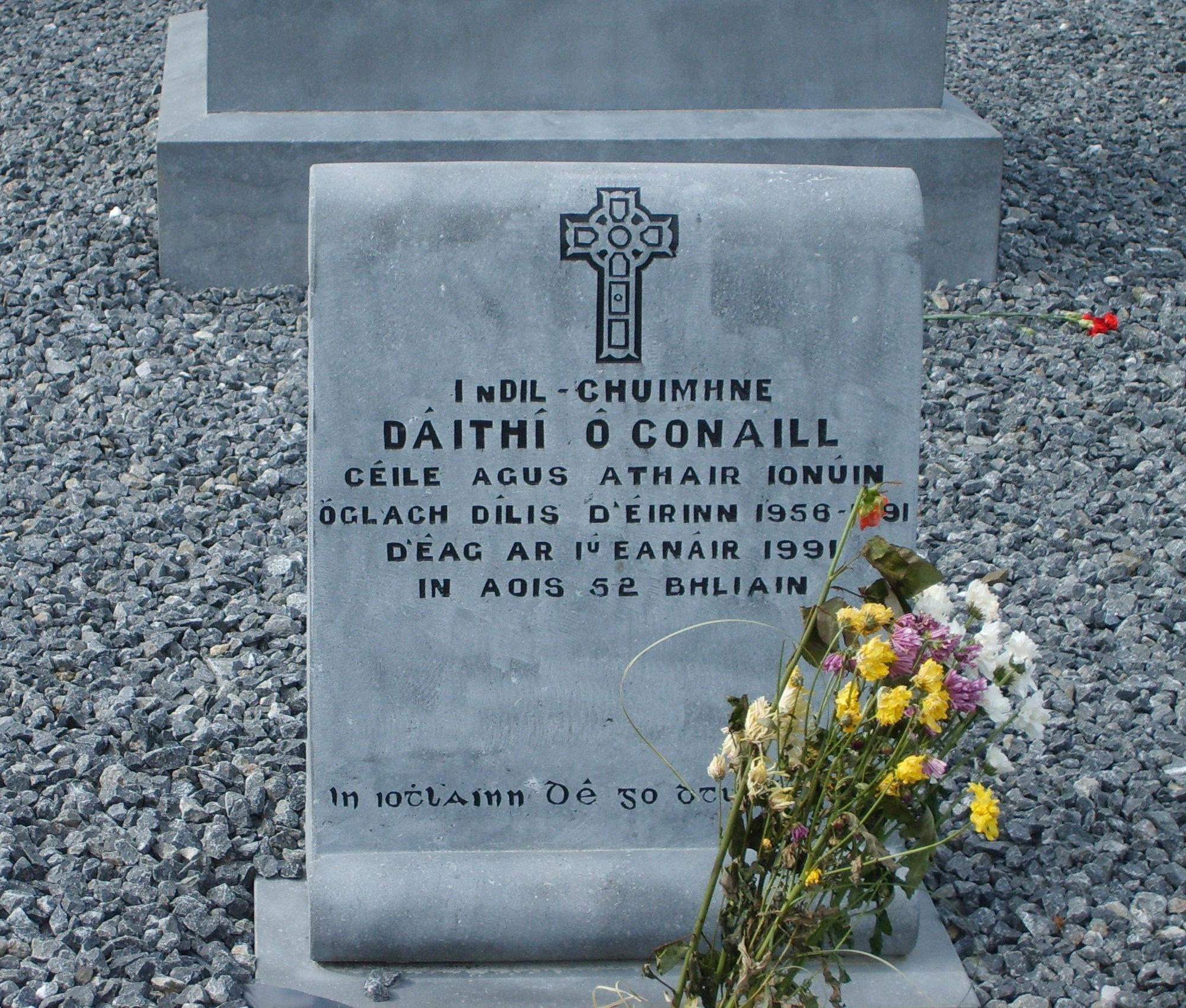
Ó Conaill's gravestone in Glasnevin Cemetery, Dublin.

Ó Conaill helped form the Provisional IRA after the 1969 IRA split, served on the first Provisional IRA Army Council, and was the Provisional IRA's Director of Publicity. In 1970 he travelled to New York and was instrumental in establishing Irish Northern Aid or NORAID, which raised funds for the Provisionals.

In 1971 he travelled to Prague and purchased 4.5 tons of small arms from the Czechoslovakia state arms marketing company, Omnipol. The consignment was later seized in Schiphol Airport, Netherlands.

Despite his belief in the armed campaign, Ó Conaill was not solely a militarist. He was deeply involved in the drafting of the Éire Nua policy, working with Ruairí Ó Brádaigh, which was launched by Sinn Féin in June 1972. He also played a leading role in the truce negotiations between the IRA and the British government in June–July 1972.

On 13 June 1972, he appeared at an IRA press conference in Derry, along with Seán Mac Stiofáin, Seamus Twomey and Martin McGuinness, which announced an IRA cease-fire proposal, and gave William Whitelaw 48 hours to make a decision.

On 20 June 1972, he represented the IRA along with Gerry Adams at secret talks at the home of Colonel Sir Michael McCorkell, Ballyarnett, County Londonderry. The British representatives were Frank Steele, who presented himself as a government official but was an MI6 agent, and Philip John Woodfield of the Northern Ireland Office. The meeting lasted four hours and the British side informed the IRA representatives that while Whitelaw refused to offer political status, he was prepared to suspend arrests of republicans and searches of homes. Both sides then agreed to call a ten-day ceasefire.

In a report, Woodfield noted that "There is no doubt whatever that these two at least genuinely want a ceasefire and a permanent end to violence," and of Ó Conaill and Adams that the "appearance and manner of the men was respectable and respectful". "Their response to every argument was reasonable and moderate. (…) Their behaviour and attitude appeared to bear no relation to the indiscriminate campaigns of bombing and shooting in which they have both been prominent leaders."

On 26 June the IRA called a "bilateral truce". On 7 July 1972 he was part of the IRA delegation which met with representatives of the British government in London (see article on Seán Mac Stiofáin for more details). O Conaill impressed the British, referring to the possibility of a "Protestant Backlash" O Conaill said: "These are our people and we do not desire nor would we welcome a clash with them. But the fact must be faced that they cannot be allowed to intimidate and hold out on the whole people of Ireland."

After the collapse of the IRA-British government contacts, Ó Conaill maintained informal contacts with Sir John Hackett, by then retired and Principal of King's College London, and who had been the commanding officer of British troops in Northern Ireland. In September 1973, Hackett reported to Woodfield of the Northern Ireland Office that Ó Conaill was "losing ground to younger and more impatient operators. To arrest him and remove him from the scene would loosen restraint on those and open the way for more irresponsible action."

In 1974, at a secret meeting arranged by journalist Kevin Myers, Ó Conaill and Brian Keenan had talks with Ulster Volunteer Force (UVF) leaders Billy Mitchell and Jim Hanna in Lough Sheelin, County Cavan. Myers summarised the purpose of the talks: "The IRA simply wished to discuss the terms of the loyalist surrender and the loyalists wished merely to assure the IRA they had no intention of surrendering." The meeting lasted four hours. Mitchell later recalled that "We just wanted to get to know one another. And we thought we could find a way to call an end to everything." "I really liked David. And neither of us accused the other of anything".

In an interview with Mary Holland on London Weekend Television's Weekend World on 17 November 1974, Ó Conaill claimed there would be an escalation of IRA violence. Four days later on 21 November the IRA detonated bombs in two pubs in Birmingham, killing 21 civilians. This was not what Ó Conaill had intended, as the Provisional IRA leadership did not endorse indiscriminate bombing in England. The interview and the attacks led to the introduction of the Prevention of Terrorism Act in the United Kingdom. The interview prompted hostile questions in the Parliament of the United Kingdom.

Although Ó Conaill was on the run for much of the early 1970s, he managed to make some public appearances. In 1973, he gave the oration at the Easter Rising commemoration in Belfast, and the following year he spoke at the funeral of IRA hunger striker Michael Gaughan in Ballina.

While on the run he was prominent in arranging the Feakle talks with Protestant clergymen in December 1974. In 1975 Ó Conaill was regularly consulted by Republican representatives who negotiated a truce with British representatives, including Ruairí Ó Brádaigh and Billy McKee, but he did not meet with the British representatives.

Ó Conaill was Officer Commanding (O/C) of the IRA Southern Command for much of the early 1970s until his arrest in July 1975. (He was replaced by Pat Doherty). He was found guilty of IRA membership and imprisoned in Portlaoise Prison, where in 1977 he was one of 20 men who took part in a 47-day hunger strike in protest at conditions in the jail. Although the hunger strike ended in failure it is said to have contributed to the fall of the ruling Irish government.

On 18 April 1976, he and his son Feargal took part in a parade to commemorate the 1916 Easter Rising in Drumboe, Stranorlar, County Donegal

Soon after the July 1982 bombings that killed 11 soldiers in London, he spoke at a rally in Monaghan and threatened more bombs in Britain.

== Involvement in Sinn Féin electoral campaigns ==
Upon his release from prison, he was active in the Anti H-Block Movement. Contrary to popular opinion, it was Ó Conaill and not Gerry Adams who proposed that Bobby Sands contest the Westminster by-election for Fermanagh and South Tyrone during the 1981 Irish Hunger Strike. This decision was made at the March 1981 Sinn Féin Ard Chomhairle meeting.

He was the director of elections in the June 1981 Irish general election in which two prisoners were elected to Dáil Éireann: hunger striker Kieran Doherty in Cavan–Monaghan and prison protester Paddy Agnew in the Louth constituency.

In 1983, along with Ruairí Ó Brádaigh, he resigned from the position of vice-president of Sinn Féin in opposition to the dropping of the Éire Nua policy.

== Joins Republican Sinn Féin ==
At the 1986 Sinn Féin Ard Fheis, he opposed the decision to drop abstentionism to Leinster House. He joined in the walk out led by Ó Brádaigh and was chairman of Republican Sinn Féin from 1986 to 1987 and subsequently a vice-president of the party.

Three days before his death he wrote a document entitled Towards a Peaceful Ireland, which offered a traditionalist republican solution to Irish partition.

== Death ==
On 1 January 1991, his family found him dead at his home in Raheny, Dublin. He had gone to bed complaining of feeling ill. He is buried in Glasnevin Cemetery where a commemoration is held annually.

== Notes and references ==
Party political offices
Preceded by Larry Grogan; Joe Clarke	Vice-President of Sinn Féin; 1971–1978; With: Joe Clarke (1971–1972); Máire Drumm (1972–1976); Joe Cahill (1976–1978)	Succeeded by Joe Cahill; Gerry Adams
Preceded by Joe Cahill; Gerry Adams	Vice-President of Sinn Féin; 1978?–1983; With: Gerry Adams	Succeeded by Phil Flynn
