= Rory O'Driscoll =

American soccer player

Personal information
- Date of birth: February 16, 2000 (age 26)
- Place of birth: Minneapolis, Minnesota, United States
- Height: 5 ft 10 in (1.78 m)
- Position: Attacking midfielder

Youth career
- –2015: Minneapolis United
- 2015–2019: Minnesota Thunder

College career
Years	Team	Apps	(Gls)
2019–2022	New Hampshire Wildcats	63	(19)

Senior career*
Years	Team	Apps	(Gls)
2019–2020	Minneapolis City		
2021	North Carolina Fusion U23	8	(2)
2022	Minneapolis City	0	(0)
2023–2024	Minnesota United 2	44	(8)
2024	Minnesota United	1	(0)
2025	Las Vegas Lights	16	(0)
- * Club domestic league appearances and goals as of October 28, 2025

Rory O'Driscoll (born February 16, 2000) is an American soccer player who plays as an attacking midfielder.

== Career ==
=== Youth, college and amateur ===
O'Driscoll was a five-time State Tournament champion with Minneapolis United, before going on join the Minnesota Thunder Academy where he played from under-15 to under-19 level.

In 2019, O'Driscoll attended the University of New Hampshire to play college soccer, where he went on to make 63 appearances, scoring 19 goals and tallying seven assists for the Wildcats. He was named to the America East All-Rookie Team in 2019, and was named America East Midfielder of the Year and America East First Team All-Conference for the 2020–21 season.

While at college, O'Driscoll also played with Minneapolis City in the National Premier Soccer League in both 2019 and 2020, helping the team to be named 2019 NPSL North Conference Champions. He also played with the club's under-23 side. He had spells in the USL League Two with North Carolina Fusion U23 in 2021, and returned to Minneapolis City after their move to the league in 2022, but didn't make any appearances due to injury.

=== Professional ===
On December 21, 2022, O'Driscoll was selected 78th overall in the 2023 MLS SuperDraft by Nashville SC. However, he went unsigned by the Major League Soccer side. He signed his first professional contract with MLS Next Pro side Minnesota United FC 2 on March 23, 2023. On June 29, 2024, O'Driscoll signed a short-term deal to appear for the Minnesota United FC first team. He made his debut the same day, appearing as an injury-time substitute during a 3–2 loss away to Portland Timbers. He left Minnesota following their 2024 season.

On February 27, 2025, O'Driscoll signed with USL Championship side Las Vegas Lights. He was released by Las Vegas following their 2025 season.
