= Ardfheis =

Term for annual conferences of Irish political parties

Ardfheis or ard fheis (/ɑːrd ˈɛʃ/ ard ESH, Irish: [ˌaːɾˠd̪ˠ ˈɛʃ]; 'high assembly'; plural ardfheiseanna) is the name used by many Irish political parties for their annual party conference.

== Usage ==
Among the parties who use the term ardfheis or ard fheis are:

- Fine Gael
- Fianna Fáil
- Sinn Féin
- Irish Republican Socialist Party
- Éirígí
- Green Party
- Republican Sinn Féin
- National Party
- Workers' Party
- Aontú
- Connolly Youth Movement

In the Republic of Ireland, the Labour Party, Communist Party, People Before Profit–Solidarity, and the Social Democrats do not use the term ardfheis; however, it is still sometimes used by the media to refer to their annual conventions in an unofficial way.

== Ard chomhairle ==
Many political parties who use the term ard fheis also use the term ard chomhairle which means 'national executive committee' (literally 'high council'), and is the governing body of the party.
