= Proinsias Mac Airt =

Irish republican activist

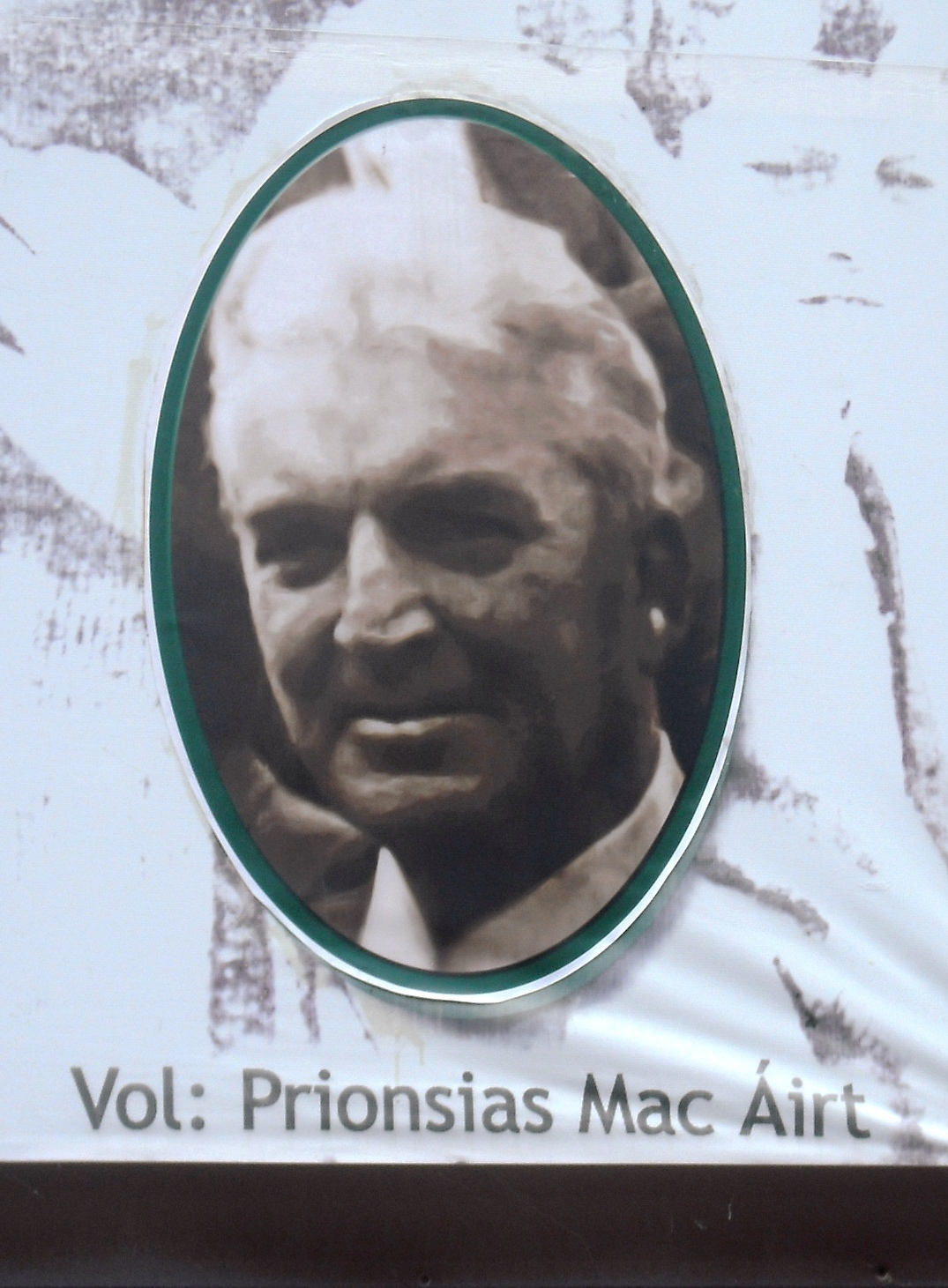
Mac Airt's image as part of a public display of local IRA veterans in the Clonard area of Belfast

Proinsias Mac Airt (English: Frank Card) (18 April 1922 – 8 January 1992) was an Irish republican activist and long-serving member of the Irish Republican Army.

== Early years ==
Mac Airt was born in Belfast in April 1922. He first became involved in Irish republicanism as a boy when he joined the Fianna Éireann. His first imprisonment was in 1942 when the youthful Mac Airt was sent to jail for illegal military foot drilling. Mac Airt was later interned during the Irish Republican Army's Border Campaign of 1956-1962.

== Founding the PIRA ==
Having retired at some earlier point Mac Airt returned to the republican movement in 1969, throwing his lot in with the newly established Provisional Irish Republican Army (PIRA) and their political arm Provisional Sinn Féin. Indeed, in early 1970 his Padraig Pearse cumann, which he set up in the Clonard area of the Falls Road, was the first branch of Provisional Sinn Féin established in Belfast and proved central to the growth of the dissident party in the city. In August 1970 Mac Airt was appointed editor of the Belfast-based Republican News, succeeding Jimmy Steele who had died soon after being appointed editor. Despite his advancing age Mac Airt also became involved in the gun battles that raged between the republicans from Falls and loyalists from the neighbouring Shankill Road. As a consequence Mac Airt became one of the leaders of the nascent PIRA in Belfast. Mac Airt was publicly named as a leading republican by General Anthony Farrar-Hockley who had commanded the British Army present during the clashes and with whom Mac Airt had held failed negotiations at the scene of conflict. He served as Adjutant to Billy McKee, who was first commander of the Provisional IRA Belfast Brigade. According to Brendan Hughes Mac Airt's Kane Street home doubled as Belfast Brigade headquarters at this early stage in the movement's history.

On 15 April 1971 Mac Airt, along with Billy McKee, was arrested by the British Army when found in possession of a handgun. Both men were sentenced under the Explosive Substances Act 1883 and sent to Crumlin Road Gaol. In the prison the two men were recognised as the leaders of the republican prisoners, a role held by Gusty Spence on the loyalist side. Mac Airt and McKee co-operated informally with Spence to maintain order until they agreed to establish an official Camp Council. The make-up of this group saw Mac Airt and McKee representing the PIRA, Spence and an associate identified only as "Robert" representing the Ulster Volunteer Force and Ned McCreery and James Craig as Ulster Defence Association delegates, with members of the Official IRA and Irish National Liberation Army eventually added.

== Later activity ==
Mac Airt was involved in the talks held between republicans and clergymen from various Protestant churches held at Feakle on 12 December 1974. Whilst the talks produced little Mac Airt was one of those who maintained contact with the clergymen. Indeed, on 19 January 1975 one of the ministers, Rev William Arlow of the Irish Council of Churches, even introduced Mac Airt and his ally Jimmy Drumm to British government officials Michael Oatley and James Allan in an attempt to have the republican grievances heard.

Although a new generation of leaders emerged in the PIRA and Sinn Féin Mac Airt remained an influential veteran. He was close to Danny Morrison and Tom Hartley and helped to ensure the removal of Seán Caughey from the editorship of Republican News in 1975 and his replacement by Morrison.

== Irish Songs of Freedom ==
In 1968 Mac Airt recorded two vocal songs; Croppy Boy and Flag of the Fianna on the LP record 'Irish Songs of Freedom' produced for the Outlet Recording Co. Ltd, Belfast.

== Death ==
Mac Airt died in 1992 at the age of 69. Sinn Féin President Gerry Adams delivered the graveside oration at his funeral, describing him as "a radical in the Connolly tradition".

Media offices
Preceded by Jimmy Steele	Editor of Republican News; 1970–1973	Succeeded by Leo Martin
