= John Joe McGirl =

Irish republican (1921–1988)

Teachta Dála
- In office March 1957 – May 1961
- Constituency: Sligo–Leitrim

Chief of Staff of the IRA
- In office October 1958 – 24 October 1958
- Preceded by: Seán Cronin
- Succeeded by: Ruairí Ó Brádaigh

Personal details
- Born: 25 March 1921 Drumany, Aughnasheelin, County Leitrim, Ireland
- Died: 8 December 1988 (aged 67) County Leitrim, Ireland
- Party: Sinn Féin
- Spouse: Bridget McGirl
- Children: 4

John Joe McGirl (25 March 1921 – 8 December 1988) was an Irish republican, a Sinn Féin politician, and the Chief of Staff of the Irish Republican Army.

== Biography ==
=== Anti-Treaty IRA ===
He was born in Drumany, Aughnasheelin, County Leitrim, the son of Joseph McGirl, a farmer, and Bridget McGirl (née Gallagher). McGirl became involved with the Irish Republican Army (IRA) in the 1930s. McGirl was trained for the 1939–1940 sabotage/bombing attack on British soil – the S-Plan. He was arrested along with Cathal Goulding and ten others in April 1946. McGirl was sentenced to 12 months in prison for IRA membership spending his prison time in the Curragh Camp. McGirl was interned again in the 1950s.

McGirl participated in the IRA Border campaign. In January 1957, he was tried and convicted at Ballinamore courthouse and imprisoned in Mountjoy Prison.

Although a prisoner, he was elected as a Sinn Féin Teachta Dála (TD) for the Sligo–Leitrim constituency at the 1957 general election, topping the poll with 7,007 votes (15.7%). Running on an abstentionist ticket, Sinn Féin won four seats at the general election (also Eighneachán Ó hAnnluain, Ruairí Ó Brádaigh and John Joe Rice). McGirl did not retain his seat at the 1961 general election. His share of the vote was halved and he received only 2,487 votes (7.3%).

In November 1957, he delivered the oration at the funerals of some of the "Edentubber martyrs", four IRA members who were killed when a bomb they were preparing accidentally exploded. In 1962, he served on the committee that founded St. Felim's College, Ballinamore.

=== Provisionals ===
When the IRA split in 1969, between Official IRA and Provisional IRA factions, McGirl sided with the Provisionals, who were committed to launching an armed campaign against British rule in Northern Ireland. He was interned in Long Kesh in 1974 and was present when it was burned by internees (15 October 1974).

McGirl contested the February 1982 and 1987 general elections for Sligo–Leitrim. In the former contest, he received 2,772 votes (6.1%) and in the latter, 2,627 votes (5.7%).

McGirl served as vice-president of Sinn Féin. Originally he was opposed to the dropping of the Éire Nua policy and was considered an ally of Ruairí Ó Brádaigh (who later founded Republican Sinn Féin). However, at the 1986 Sinn Féin Ardfheis, McGirl supported the moves of Gerry Adams and Martin McGuinness to drop the policy of abstentionism, greatly angering his contemporaries Ó Brádaigh and Dáithí Ó Conaill.

McGirl was a publican, undertaker and bicycle-repairer in Ballinamore. He was elected a Sinn Féin councillor to Leitrim County Council in 1960, serving as chairperson of that body. He was still a member of the council at the time of his death. After his death, a monument was erected to McGirl in his native town of Ballinamore. It is located on the bridge crossing the Shannon–Erne Waterway. Each August there is a commemoration and march through Ballinamore to the John Joe McGirl monument.

A nephew, Francis McGirl, was charged but acquitted of the murder of Lord Mountbatten, who was killed by the IRA when his boat was bombed off the Sligo coast in 1979. John Joe's son, Liam McGirl, was co-opted on to Leitrim County Council in 1988 after his father's death.

Party political offices
Preceded by Phil Flynn	Vice-President of Sinn Féin; 1985–1988	Succeeded by Pat Doherty

Dáil	Election	Deputy (Party)	Deputy (Party)	Deputy (Party)	Deputy (Party)	Deputy (Party)
13th	1948	Eugene Gilbride (FF)	Stephen Flynn (FF)	Bernard Maguire (Ind.)	Mary Reynolds (FG)	Joseph Roddy (FG)
14th	1951	Eugene Gilbride (FF)	Stephen Flynn (FF)	Patrick Rogers (FG)	Mary Reynolds (FG)	Joseph Roddy (FG)
15th	1954	Eugene Gilbride (FF)	Stephen Flynn (FF)	Bernard Maguire (Ind.)	Mary Reynolds (FG)	Joseph Roddy (FG)
16th	1957	Eugene Gilbride (FF)	Stephen Flynn (FF)	John Joe McGirl (SF)	Mary Reynolds (FG)	Patrick Rogers (FG)
16th	1961 by-election	Eugene Gilbride (FF)	Joseph McLoughlin (FG)	John Joe McGirl (SF)	Mary Reynolds (FG)	Patrick Rogers (FG)
17th	1961	Eugene Gilbride (FF)	Joseph McLoughlin (FG)	James Gallagher (FF)	Eugene Gilhawley (FG)	4 seats 1961–1969
18th	1965	Eugene Gilbride (FF)	Joseph McLoughlin (FG)	James Gallagher (FF)	Eugene Gilhawley (FG)	4 seats 1961–1969
19th	1969	Ray MacSharry (FF)	Joseph McLoughlin (FG)	James Gallagher (FF)	3 seats 1969–1981	
20th	1973	Ray MacSharry (FF)	Joseph McLoughlin (FG)	Eugene Gilhawley (FG)	3 seats 1969–1981	
21st	1977	Ray MacSharry (FF)	James Gallagher (FF)	Eugene Gilhawley (FG)	3 seats 1969–1981	
22nd	1981	Ray MacSharry (FF)	John Ellis (FF)	Joe McCartin (FG)	Ted Nealon (FG)	4 seats 1981–2007
23rd	1982 (Feb)	Ray MacSharry (FF)	John Ellis (FF)	Matt Brennan (FF)	Ted Nealon (FG)	4 seats 1981–2007
24th	1982 (Nov)	Ray MacSharry (FF)	Joe McCartin (FG)	Matt Brennan (FF)	Ted Nealon (FG)	4 seats 1981–2007
25th	1987	Ray MacSharry (FF)	John Ellis (FF)	Matt Brennan (FF)	Ted Nealon (FG)	4 seats 1981–2007
26th	1989	Gerry Reynolds (FG)	John Ellis (FF)	Matt Brennan (FF)	Ted Nealon (FG)	4 seats 1981–2007
27th	1992	Declan Bree (Lab)	John Ellis (FF)	Matt Brennan (FF)	Ted Nealon (FG)	4 seats 1981–2007
28th	1997	Gerry Reynolds (FG)	John Ellis (FF)	Matt Brennan (FF)	John Perry (FG)	4 seats 1981–2007
29th	2002	Marian Harkin (Ind.)	John Ellis (FF)	Jimmy Devins (FF)	John Perry (FG)	4 seats 1981–2007
30th	2007	Constituency abolished. See Sligo–North Leitrim and Roscommon–South Leitrim				

Dáil	Election	Deputy (Party)	Deputy (Party)	Deputy (Party)	Deputy (Party)
32nd	2016	Martin Kenny (SF)	Marc MacSharry (FF)	Eamon Scanlon (FF)	Tony McLoughlin (FG)
33rd	2020	Martin Kenny (SF)	Marc MacSharry (FF)	Marian Harkin (Ind.)	Frank Feighan (FG)
34th	2024	Martin Kenny (SF)	Eamon Scanlon (FF)	Marian Harkin (Ind.)	Frank Feighan (FG)
