= United Irishman (disambiguation) =

The United Irishman was an Irish nationalist newspaper founded in 1899 by Arthur Griffith and William Rooney.

United Irishman may also refer to:

- United Irishman (1848 newspaper), founded by John Mitchel
- The United Irishman (New York), edited and published by Jeremiah O'Donovan Rossa from 1881 to 1910
- United Irishman (1948 newspaper), the official monthly organ of Sinn Féin, and later of Official Sinn Féin
- United Irishman (2000 newspaper), produced by those involved in the Official Republican Movement

== See also ==
- United Ireland (disambiguation)
- Society of United Irishmen, organised the Irish Rebellion of 1798
