= Easter Lily (badge) =

Irish republican badge

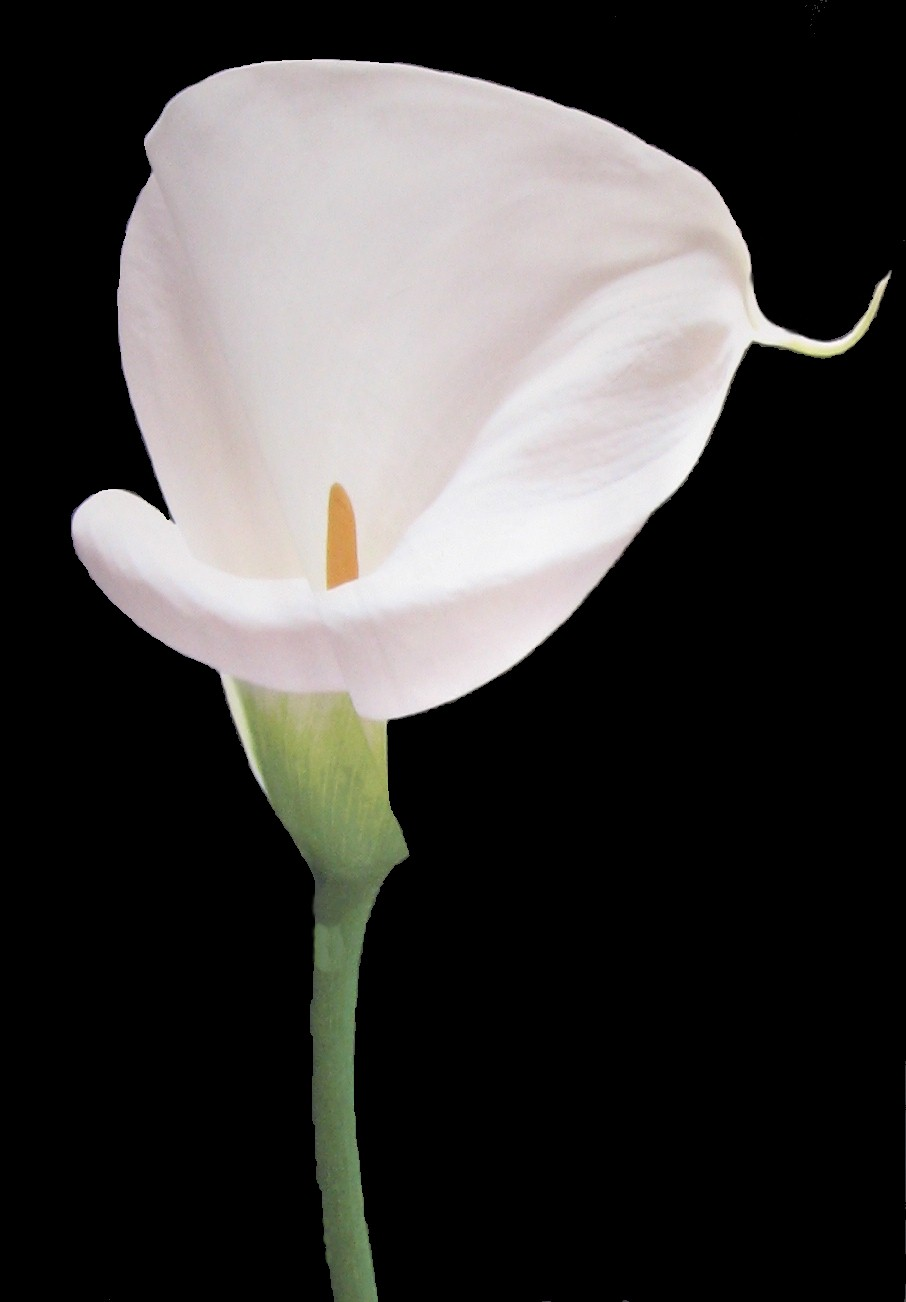
The Easter Lily flower, upon which the designs are based

The Easter Lily (Irish: Lile na Cásca) is a badge in the shape of a calla lily flower, worn during Easter by Irish republicans as a symbol of remembrance for Irish republican combatants who died during or were executed after the 1916 Easter Rising. Depending on the political affiliations of the bearer, it can also commemorate members of the pre-Treaty Irish Republican Army, both post-Treaty Irish Republican Armies, and either the Provisional IRA or the Official IRA. It may also be used to commemorate members of the Irish National Liberation Army (INLA).

The badge has traditionally been made of paper affixed with a pin, though self-adhesive and, from the 1990s, metal versions have also circulated. Coloured in green, white and orange, it was intended by its originators to recall the tricolour flag raised over the General Post Office during the Rising. Proceeds from its sale have historically gone towards republican prisoners' dependants funds and the upkeep of republican graves and memorials, and the badge has been sold both at church gates on Easter Sunday and door-to-door.

Since its introduction, the lily has been a recurring source of political contention. Governments in both the Republic of Ireland and Northern Ireland have, at various points, sought to restrict its sale or display, while its status alongside the British Remembrance poppy has remained a point of dispute in Northern Ireland into the 21st century.

== History ==
=== Introduction (1925–1926) ===
The wearing of ribbons and colours had been used by 19th century Irish nationalists to circumvent laws prohibiting the flying of flags and banners, and the 1916 Rising itself was remembered in the years that followed through similarly furtive and symbolic means, including Mass cards and the singing of songs. The Easter Lily was introduced in 1926 by Cumann na mBan, reputedly conceived by Sighle Humphreys. The republican newspaper The United Irishman later gave 1925 as the year of introduction, though this is not corroborated elsewhere, and most accounts, including Cumann na mBan's own publicity material, tie the badge's launch to the tenth anniversary of the Rising in 1926. The lily was chosen partly because it was seen as a less compromised symbol than the tricolour, which republicans regarded as having been debased by its association with the newly partitioned state. Cumann na mBan publicity explained that the men of 1916 had raised "the banner of complete separation from England", and that although that banner had since been lowered by the state, it was raised again in the Easter Lily.

Proceeds from the sale of the badge went to the Irish Republican Prisoners' Dependents' Fund. Traditionally, they were sold outside church gates on Easter Sunday and worn at republican commemorations. In the early years of their existence, people from a broad political spectrum, from Fianna Fáil to Sinn Féin, wore lilies, which were sold by members of those political parties as well as the Irish Republican Army (IRA), Fianna Éireann, and Conradh na Gaeilge. The youth movement Clan na Gael also sold the badge as part of the same Cumann na mBan fundraising campaign, which was explicitly framed as a republican alternative to the Remembrance poppy appeal for the relief of Irish ex-servicemen. The Easter Lily Committee, which administered the sale of the badge on behalf of Cumann na mBan, was supported financially and administratively by Sinn Féin and the IRA, who recognised its importance in raising funds for both organisations; its early treasurer was Cumann na mBan member Elgin O'Rahilly (née Barry), who had been imprisoned and had gone on hunger strike in 1923.

=== National Graves Association and early growth (1926–1934) ===
Easter Lily poster, c. 1928-1932 by Cumann na mBan

The tenth anniversary of the Rising in 1926 also saw the foundation of the National Graves Association, a republican commemorative body that has erected monuments across Ireland; its founding members included Kathleen Clarke, Joseph Clarke, Seán Fitzpatrick, James Stritch and Lily O'Brennan. The Association unveiled its first monument, at the 1916 plot in Glasnevin Cemetery, in 1929, in a ceremony carried out by An Phoblacht editor Frank Ryan. The lily's early growth took place against the far larger popular commemoration of the First World War in the Irish Free State, particularly Armistice Day, and the emblem was intended in part as a republican riposte to the Royal British Legion's Flanders poppy campaign, which was formally launched in Ireland in October 1925. Sales figures from the period illustrate the disparity: in 1926, its first year, the lily raised only £34, compared with £7,430 raised by the British Legion's poppy appeal in the same year; by 1934 lily sales had risen to just over £900, but the badge remained a minority symbol, sold largely by women and children associated with Cumann na mBan and Fianna Éireann. A letter sent by Cumann na mBan organisers to veteran Madge Daly in February 1930 set out an ambition to produce and sell up to half a million lilies that year, expressing a hope that the collection would "at least, rival in magnitude" the British Legion's poppy campaign. The dependants' fund that the lily supported had originally been intended for the families of republicans imprisoned during the War of Independence, but was redirected towards anti-Treaty internees from 1922, a development the Cumann na nGaedheal government characterised as having been "seized on behalf of the irregulars". By 1932, one English newspaper reported that the lily was worn by the vast majority of those taking part in, and watching, that year's Easter procession.

In Northern Ireland, the government considered banning the lily as an emblem of republicanism as early as 1928, but a draft order was abandoned owing to the difficulty of legally defining the emblem it wished to prohibit. The authorities nonetheless held that the public sale, distribution or wearing of the lily was prejudicial to the preservation of peace, and the police retained the power to remove it.

=== Fianna Fáil "Easter Torch" alternative (1930s) ===
Advertisement featuring Fianna Fáil's "Easter Torch" concept

In the 1930s, relations between Fianna Fáil and the IRA deteriorated considerably. Following the murder by the IRA of Richard More O'Ferrall in February 1935, the Fianna Fáil leadership instructed party members to stop selling the lily, as it was "the symbol of an organisation of whose methods we disapprove". For its Easter commemorations that same year, Fianna Fáil introduced a new symbol called the Easter Torch. This was sold for a number of years but was discontinued as the badge proved unpopular with the party grass roots, many of whom continued to wear the Easter Lily. Accounts of the Torch's origins vary somewhat: The United Irishman later recalled that Fianna Fáil had begun moving away from the lily once it formed a government in 1932, though the more specific link between the Torch's formal launch and the 1935 killing of More O'Ferrall is corroborated by other sources.

=== The Irish diaspora ===
The Easter Lily was also worn by Irish emigrant communities at commemorations in San Francisco in 1952, where one was pinned on each attendee, and Birmingham in 1962, where The United Irishman reported that every marcher wore one.

=== Street and House to House Collections Act (1960s) ===
For much of its history, the sale of the lily represented an important source of income for republicans in the Republic of Ireland, and this was not significantly curtailed until 1962, when the 1962 Street and House to House Collections Act was passed. The Act required that street collectors obtain a permit from the local Garda Chief Superintendent. Irish republicans generally refused to apply for a permit from a state they did not recognise, which allowed the government to arrest lily-sellers without formally banning the sale of the badge itself. The Act also repealed the relevant section of an earlier British-era statute, the Collections Act of 1916, under which lily-sellers had previously been prosecuted, a fact The United Irishman suggested had proven embarrassing to the government owing to the statute's origins. Under the 1962 Act, a permit could be refused where a Chief Superintendent believed the proceeds might, in the words of the legislation, "encourage, whether directly or indirectly, the commission of an unlawful act"; an appeal lay to the District Court, but the Act provided that such an appeal would be disallowed if a Garda inspector swore on oath that the proceeds were likely to be put towards an unlawful purpose, and the resulting decision was final. In a 1962 case at Gorey, County Wexford, in which three men were charged under the older 1916 Act for selling lilies the previous Easter, District Justice Donagh MacDonagh asked the local Garda superintendent whether a permit would have been granted had one been sought; the superintendent replied that it would not.

Prosecutions under the new regime were extensive: by January 1964, more than 100 men and women had been sentenced for selling Easter Lilies without a permit since Easter 1963, of whom twelve had by then served their sentences. Specific cases reported in September 1963 included Peter Albert McGovern of Swanlinbar and Thomas Greenan of Drumalee, both County Cavan, who were each fined £1 at Cavan town, where a picket of six men was held outside the courthouse and a statement was issued explaining that proceeds from lily sales in the county funded Requiem Masses for the republican dead and the annual Easter commemoration. Seán Mac Suibhne and J. J. O'Sullivan of Bantry, County Cork, were each fined £2 at Dunmanway court, while Patrick Quinn of Ballina, County Mayo, was fined £2 or seven days' imprisonment. The United Irishman attributed the tightening of the law to Charles Haughey, then Minister for Justice, linking the Collections Act to a wider body of legislation it argued was aimed at narrowing the scope of republican activity, including the Official Secrets Act 1963, the Local Government (Planning and Development) Act 1963, the Firearms Bill 1963 and the Criminal Justice Bill 1963. Writing in the Sunday Independent in March 1964, the commentator Proinsias Mac Aonghusa observed that while the public did not support the physical force movement, it gave still less support to the harassment of republicans over what he considered minor matters.

=== Easter Rising Golden Jubilee and the Sword of Light (1966) ===
Una Watter's Sword of Light design was used extensively in 1966, but it did not last long in cultural memory

Ahead of the fiftieth anniversary of the Rising in 1966, the Irish government attempted to supplant the Easter Lily with a new official emblem, running a public competition for the design of a commemorative badge. The winning design, known as "An Claidheamh Soluis" or the Sword of Light, was created by the Dublin artist Una Watters, a former National College of Art student who worked as a librarian and exhibited widely in Dublin through the 1950s and 1960s. The image drew on Celtic mythology, referring to the weapon used by King Nuada of the Tuatha Dé Danann, and had earlier been adopted by scholars of the Gaelic revival; Patrick Pearse had edited a Conradh na Gaeilge newspaper of the same name. According to the 1966 Commemoration Committee, the design was chosen because it symbolised "intuitive knowledge, education and progress". The motif appeared on badges, brooches and tie pins, on official publications, in hallmark form on silverware struck by the Assay Office, on first-day cover stamps and adhesive stickers, and on plaques fixed to the fronts of buses, becoming, in the words of Irish Times writer Mary Morrissy, the "signature brand" of the jubilee year. Watters did not live to see the design's widespread use, having died suddenly at the age of forty-seven in 1965; her Arts Council award arrived on the day her coffin left Dublin for burial in Ballinasloe. Writing decades later, Morrissy noted that the Sword of Light, despite its ubiquity in 1966, had by then been almost entirely forgotten, unlike the Easter Lily it had been designed to replace.

The lily proved difficult to displace. The sisters and niece of the executed 1916 leader Seán Mac Diarmada refused to attend an official state commemoration held in his honour in Kiltyclogher, writing to the Minister for Defence that it was hypocritical of the government to honour Mac Diarmada while simultaneously moving against the lily, the emblem of the week in which he had died. In Northern Ireland, the Minister of Home Affairs, Brian McConnell, responded to enquiries from the Stormont Prime Minister's office by clarifying that the lily had not been banned. It remained lawful to wear it at commemorations such as those held annually at Milltown Cemetery, though a street collection required a permit under the Street Collection Regulations (Northern Ireland) 1927, which the police would in practice refuse, while house-to-house collections were unaffected. In Belfast, the IRA saw the jubilee as an opportunity to overwhelm the Flags and Emblems Act; the commemoration committee's organising secretary, Liam McMillen, later recalled that Cumann na mBan and other women had made thousands of tricolour flags and bunting, distributed throughout nationalist areas of the city. Unrest during the Belfast commemorations was often linked to the public display of the lily and the tricolour: three girls wearing tricolour emblems were chased by a crowd at a march organised by Ian Paisley, and a young man wearing a tricolour ribbon and an Easter lily was set upon and had to be rescued by police.

=== "Stickies" versus "Pinheads" (1967–1980s) ===
At the 1967 Sinn Féin Ard Fheis, a motion from the Tipperary Cumann calling for the Easter Lily to be supplied with a self-adhesive backing was passed. After the 1969/70 IRA split, which led to the emergence of the Provisional IRA, the Official IRA and Official Sinn Féin kept the Easter Lily with a self-adhesive backing while the Provisionals reverted to the traditional paper and pin Easter Lily. This led to the members of the Official IRA and Official Sinn Féin being referred to pejoratively as the "Stickies". On the other hand, the Provisionals became known as the "Pinheads", a nickname that did not last.

=== Growth in Provisional circles (1990s–) ===
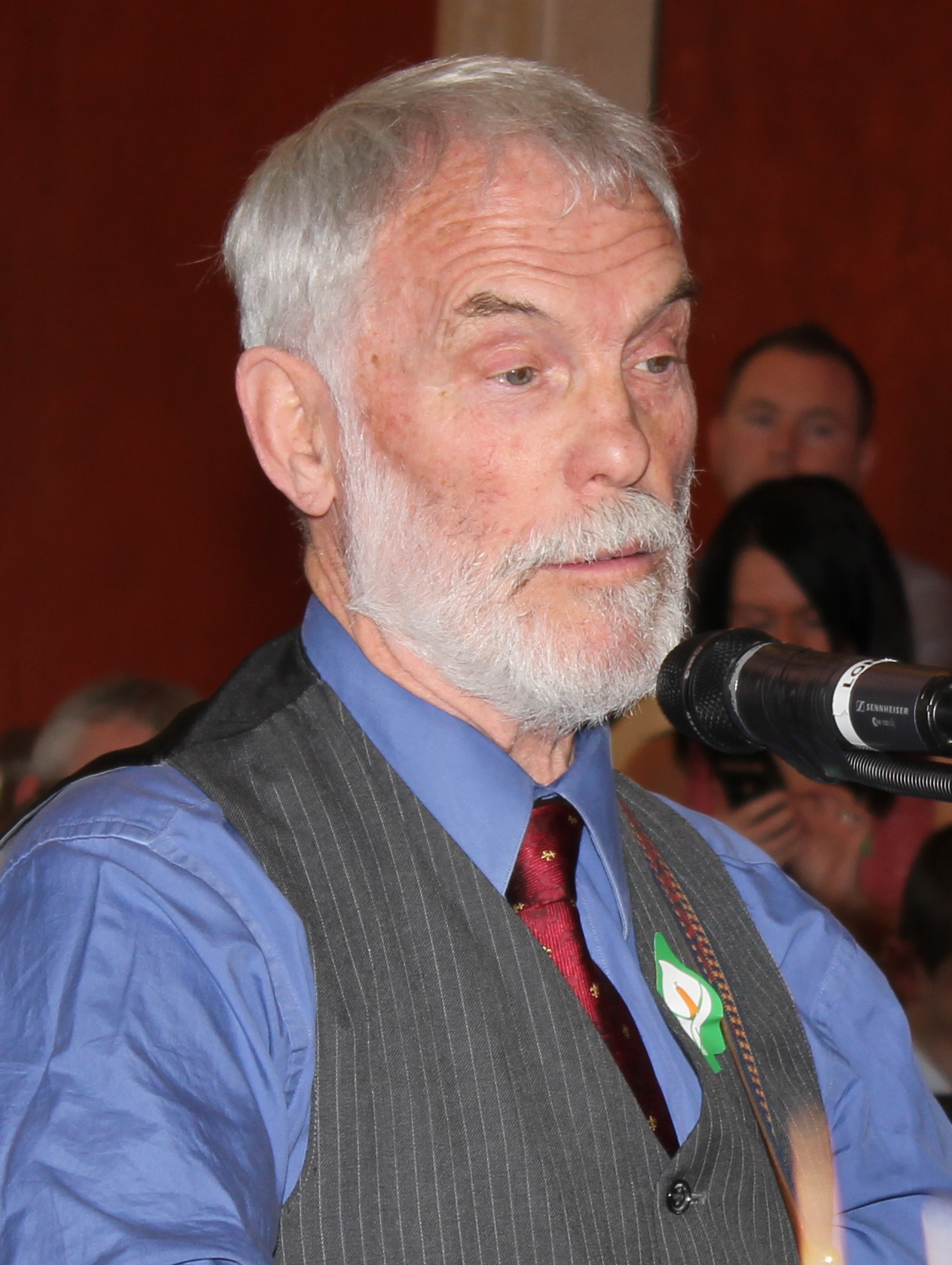
Francie Brolly

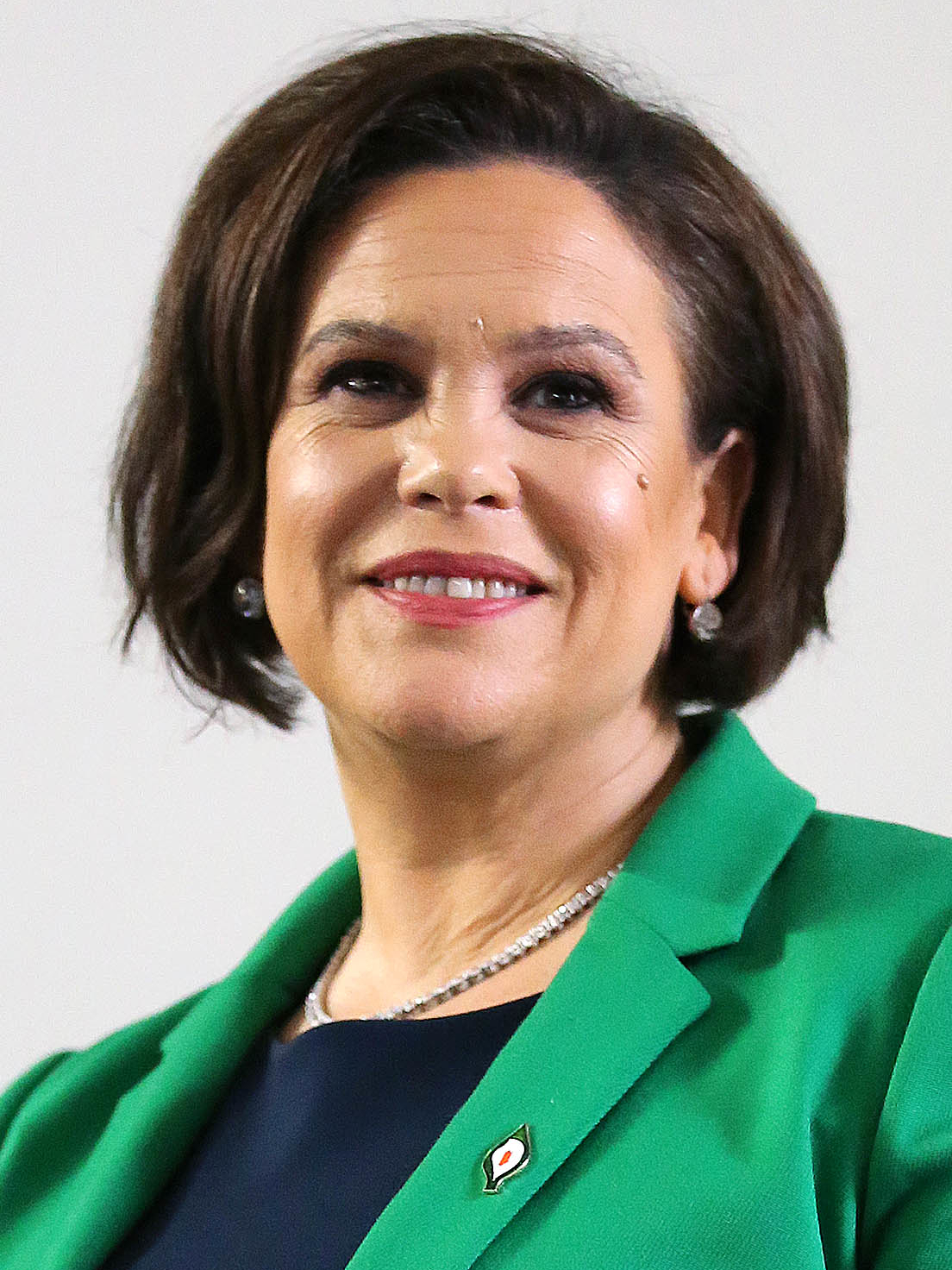
Mary Lou McDonald

Gerry Adams

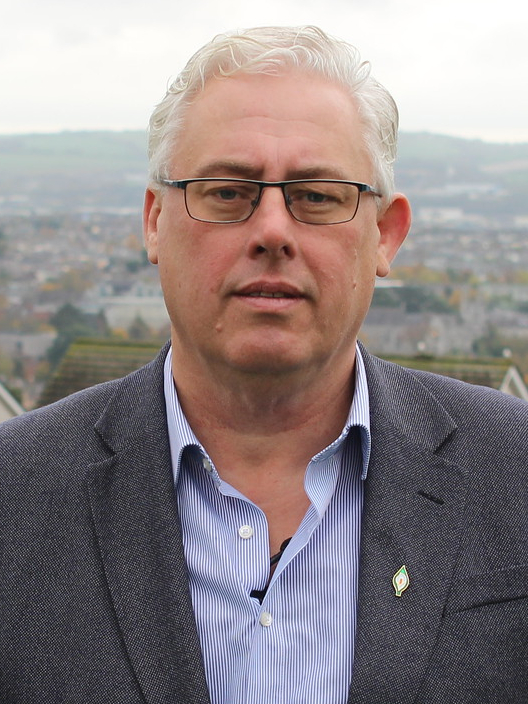
Thomas Gould

Irish Republicans wearing various forms of Easter lily badges/pins

Both the Officials and the Provisionals also saw the Easter Lily as a symbol of remembrance for their members who died on "active service". With the decline in the Official IRA, the Easter Lily became more and more associated with the Provisional Republican Movement, colloquially known as the "Provos".

In the 1990s, metal versions of the Lily became popular and are worn by some at any time of the year. Their sales and usage has increased with the rise in electoral support of Sinn Féin. By the mid 2000s, the paper-and-pin lily had become associated almost exclusively with Sinn Féin, while the self-adhesive "sticky" tradition was carried on by the political lineage that ran from the Workers' Party through Democratic Left and into the Labour Party.

=== Contemporary political controversy (2001–present) ===
The lily's status relative to the British poppy has continued to generate political dispute, particularly in Northern Ireland. In April 2001, the Northern Ireland Assembly Commission voted to display Easter lilies in the Great Hall at Stormont over the Easter recess, prompting an unsuccessful attempt by unionist members to reverse the decision at an emergency Assembly meeting. The Ulster Unionist Party's Billy Armstrong argued that the plant, Lilium longiflorum, could be toxic if eaten by household pets, while the Alliance Party leader Seán Neeson spoke in favour of the display, associating the flower with the Christian meaning of Easter but remarked that it had, in his view, been "hijacked by republicans". The Democratic Unionist Party's Jim Wells described the display as "a front for more sinister activities", while the Social Democratic and Labour Party's Alban Maginness expressed dismay that the Assembly had been reconvened over the matter at all.

In March 2006, Sinn Féin president Gerry Adams launched the party's annual Easter lily campaign on International Women's Day at Fusiliers' Arch on St Stephen's Green in Dublin, with the stated aim of encouraging more women to join the party; a party figure described the initiative as an attempt to make the lily "a fashion statement".

In April 2016, an unauthorised monument featuring an image of the Easter lily was erected at Connolly Avenue in the Mervue area of Galway ahead of that year's Rising centenary commemorations. Fine Gael councillor Pádraig Conneely called for its removal, describing it as "republican propaganda" erected without planning permission. Sinn Féin stated that it had not erected the stone, which was subsequently defaced with paint, and Galway's city manager undertook a review of its status following requests from local residents that it be retained.

Members of Sinn Féin launching their "Wear an Easter Lily" campaign in 2017

In November 2017, Sinn Féin councillor Jim McVeigh called on Belfast City Council to grant the Easter lily equal status with the poppy, so that council staff could wear it at work. The Northern Ireland Equality Commission had classified the lily, unlike the poppy and the shamrock, as an emblem with the potential to create discomfort in the workplace. Ulster Unionist councillor Chris McGimpsey dismissed the proposal as "silly nonsense", arguing that no equivalence existed between the two symbols.

In March 2026, Belfast City Council rejected, by 26 votes to 17, a Traditional Unionist Voice (TUV) proposal to prevent the Belfast National Graves Association's annual Easter lily campaign launch, held at Belfast City Hall since 2024, from proceeding that year. TUV councillor Ron McDowell criticised the event by citing IRA actions during the Troubles, including the killing of Jean McConville and the bombings of Shankill Road and the Bayardo Bar, while Sinn Féin group leader Ciarán Beattie responded that all communities in the city had their own dead to commemorate, pointing to killings carried out by loyalist paramilitaries, the British Army and the Royal Ulster Constabulary.

== In art and culture ==
=== Visual art ===
In June 2016, Foxford-born artist Katie Moore's installation Paper Bloom was exhibited at the Civic Offices in Ballina, County Mayo, as part of an artist's residency commissioned by Mayo County Council's arts office and the Jackie Clarke Collection to mark the Rising's centenary. Reviewing the piece for The Irish Times, critic Aidan Dunne gave it a five-star rating and described it as "exceptionally effective". The installation recreated the dimensions of Patrick Pearse's cell in Kilmainham Gaol, its walls formed from roughly 5,500 fabric Easter lily blooms made by Moore with the help of twenty-two volunteers in Foxford. Moore said she had been drawn to the symbol after discovering a wallet of Easter lily ribbons among the papers of the collector Jackie Clarke, and had set out to design a fabric lily that would function as "an elegant white vessel, a blank slate".

=== Music ===
The Easter Lily is the title of a song by Derek Warfield and the Young Wolfe Tones, set to the Foxhunters Reel, released in their Call of Erin, Vol. 1 album a century to the day of the Easter Rising.

== Sources ==
- An Phoblacht 5 April 2007
- Cumann na mBan
