= Seán Ó Brádaigh =

Irish republican politician and military leader (born 1937)

Seán Ó Brádaigh (IPA: [ˈʃaːn̪ˠ oː ˈbˠɾˠaːd̪ˠiː]; born 1937), sometimes anglicised as Sean Brady, is an Irish republican activist.

Like his brother, Ruairí, Seán joined Sinn Féin at an early age.

From 1958 to 1960, he edited the party newspaper, the United Irishman, and then became the party's Director of Publicity. During the 1960s, he worked with Roy Johnston to develop the Éire Nua policy. Like his brother, Seán sided with the provisional wing in the split of 1970. He became the first editor of the party's new newspaper, An Phoblacht, holding the post for two years, and also continued in his role as Director of Publicity.

In 1972, he was arrested while in the Republic of Ireland, and charged with membership of the Irish Republican Army. He immediately launched a hunger strike, and was soon released due to a lack of evidence. In 1977, he was sent a book bomb, but was on holiday at the time, his brother staying at his house. Ruairí's suspicions led to the package being detonated by the Irish Army.

Seán stood down as Director of Publicity in 1979, following a dispute with Danny Morrison over the content of the merged An Phoblacht and Republican News, and from the party's Officer Board the following year. In 1986, he followed his brother into a new organisation, which accepted his proposal that it should be named Republican Sinn Féin.

Party political offices
Preceded by ?	Sinn Féin Director of Publicity; 1960?–1979	Succeeded by Danny Morrison
Media offices
Preceded by Seán Cronin	Editor of the United Irishman; 1958–1960	Succeeded by Ruairí Ó Brádaigh
Preceded by New position	Editor of An Phoblacht; 1970–1972	Succeeded by Coleman Moynihan
