= Sean Cronin =

Sean Cronin may refer to:

- Seán Cronin (1920–2011), member of the Irish Republican Army
- Sean Cronin (actor) (born 1964), English actor and director
- Seán Cronin (rugby union) (born 1986), Irish rugby union player
