= Teeling Column =

The Teeling Column was one of four armed units created by Seán Cronin for the Border Campaign in the west of Ulster.

On 30 December 1956, the Column's inaugural operation involved an attack on the Royal Ulster Constabulary barracks in Derrylin, County Fermanagh. The object was to obtain the surrender of the garrison. The unit failed to achieve this and, fearing being outflanked by reinforcements, withdrew across the border to County Cavan.

The next day, the column's commander Noel Kavanagh and six others (including Ruairí Ó Brádaigh) were arrested in Cavan by Garda Síochána officers. All members of the Column were eventually imprisoned.

Ó Brádaigh was gaoled for six months in Mountjoy Prison, and the others were sent to Bridewell Prison.

== Members ==
- Noel Kavanagh, Dublin, Column Commander
- Ruairí Ó Brádaigh, 2nd in command.
- Pat MacManus, Kinawley, County Fermanagh
- John Joe Ruane, Athenry, County Galway
- Paddy Hannify, Athenry, County Galway
- Willie Folan, Galway city
- Peadar Murray, Newport, County Mayo
- Joe Daly, Navan, County Meath
- Dermot Blake, Navan, County Meath
- Pat McGirl, Aughavas, County Leitrim
- Paddy Duffy, Derrinacrieve, Tullyhaw, County Cavan
- Leo Collins, Navan, County Meath
- Des Clarke, Navan, County Meath
