= Leo Martin (Irish republican) =

Irish Republican

Leo Martin (1937–2011) was a founder of the Provisional IRA in Belfast and a prominent figure in The Troubles.

== Early life ==
Martin was born in 1937, and had been interned during the Border campaign of 1956–1962. In June 1953 he was sentenced to 30 days' imprisonment for possessing copies of An Phoblacht.

== IRA career ==
In 1966 he narrowly twice avoided assassination by the UVF, who had been actively seeking him out; failing to find him, they shot Matilda Gould—a protestant—and John Scullion. Martin, a prominent republican, was one of only two men from the north who were members of the Pre-split IRA Army Council; the rest were from Dublin or other parts of the Republic. Martin, by now considered a veteran of the movement, attended the meeting of 24 August 1969 at which it was alleged that the Officer Commanding the IRA's Belfast Brigade, Liam McMillen was not defending the city's Catholic community as they expected him to. As a result, he was allowed to remain as OC only on the condition that he broke off contact with the Dublin leadership. Following the split in the republican movement in 1969 between the Official and the Provisional IRAs, Martin was voted onto the first Provisional Army Council that selected Chief of Staff Seán Mac Stíofáin, (Note: Other attendees included Jimmy Steele—at whose house the meeting was held—Billy McKee, John and Billy Kelly, Joe Cahill, Seamus Twomey, Gerry Adams, Dáithí Ó Conaill and Jimmy Drumm.) and in August was despatched with the mission to collect as many arms from the south as possible. In the early 1970s, British Army agents were in contact with Martin and other Provisionals in Clonard in an attempt calm the rioting which was occurring almost every Friday night. Imprisoned in Portlaoise Prison in 1977, he led a mass-hunger strike, along with O'Connaíll and Dan Hoban which lasted 47 days.

== Later life and death ==
Martin left the Provisionals and joined Ruairí Ó Brádaigh's Republican Sinn Fein. In 2014 Loyalist supergrass Gary Haggarty revealed that Martin had been an intended target of the UVF in an attack planned weeks before the organisation called its 1994 ceasefire. Martin died in Belfast in 2011 and was buried in Milltown Cemetery.
