= The Irish People =

The Irish People was the title of a number of mostly political newspapers in Ireland and the United States.

- The Irish People (1863–1865) was an Irish nationalist newspaper of the Fenian movement founded in 1863 by James Stephens. Nationalists Charles Kickham, Thomas Clarke Luby and John O’Leary were editors of this paper. The paper was suppressed by the authorities in 1865 the offices were raided and Luby and Jeremiah O'Donovan Rossa (who was manager of the paper) were arrested.
- The Irish People (Sept. 1899 – Nov. 1903 and 30 September 1905 – 27 March 1909) was a newspaper published in Cork by William O'Brien (Irish nationalist politician), MP (not to be confused with William Smith O'Brien). The paper supported the United Irish League and land reform. The paper was edited by Tim McCarthy, and later by John Herlihy. Other contributors were Nationalist MP D.D. Sheehan. O'Brien went on to publish the Cork Free Press, with Herlihy as editor.
- The Irish People (1944–1948) was the name of a paper published by the Irish Labour Party in Dublin from 1944 (its predecessor was The Torch) until 1948 when it was replaced by The Citizen.
- The Irish People (1973) was a weekly paper published by Sinn Fein the Workers Party initially in mid 1973 named after the earlier Fenian paper and edited by Seamus Ó Tuathail but later in 1980 replacing The United Irishman. The paper was edited by Padraig Yeates from 1977–82, other editors included Peigin Doyle and Des O'Hagan. Starting in 2022 the Workers' Party produces a monthly podcast of the same name.
- The Irish People (1972–2004) was the name of a New York newspaper published and edited by Irish Republican sympathisers, including Martin Galvin and John McDonagh, under the aegis of Noraid, between 1972 and 2004.
