= Danny Morrison (Irish republican) =

Irish republican activist and militant

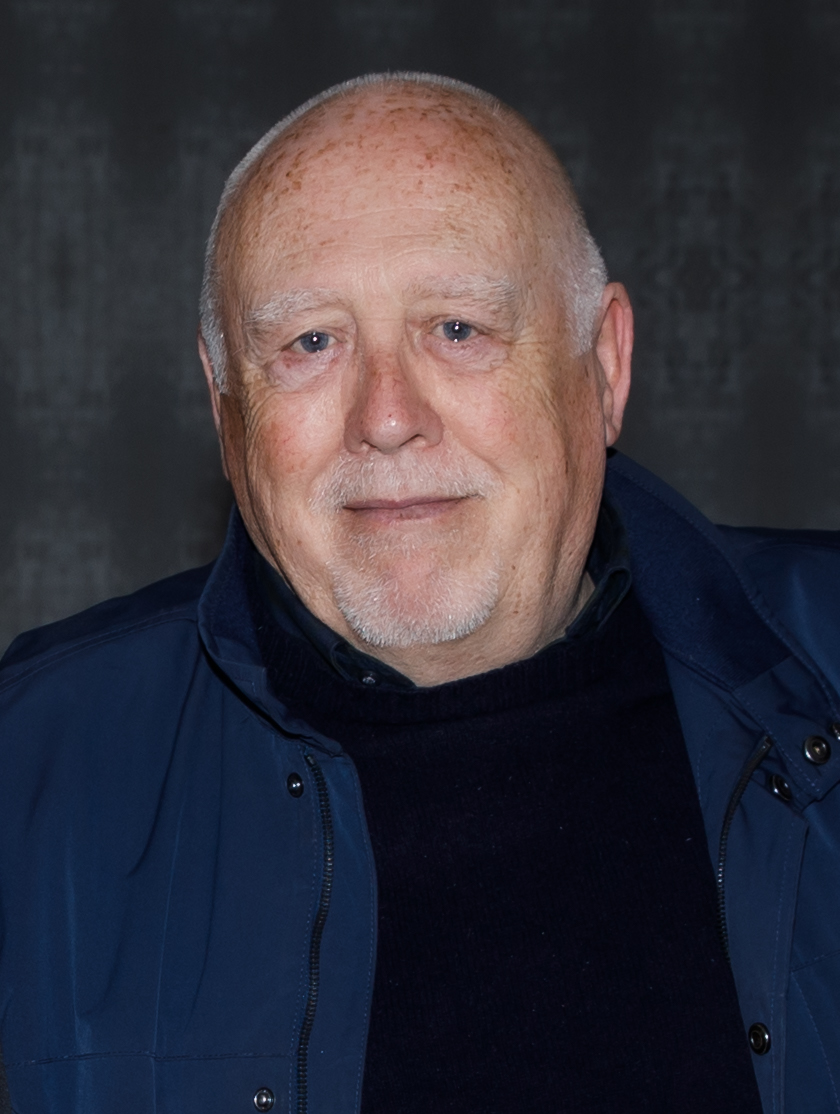
- Morrison in 2026
- Born: Daniel Gerard Morrison; 9 January 1953 (age 73); Belfast, Northern Ireland
- Occupations: Author; Politician; Political Activist
- Writing career
- Notable work: Hunger Strike (editor)
- Website: dannymorrison.com

Daniel Gerard Morrison (born 9 January 1953) is an Irish former Provisional Irish Republican Army (IRA) volunteer, author and activist who played a crucial role in public events during the Troubles in Northern Ireland. An Irish republican, Morrison is also a former Sinn Féin publicity director and editor of Republican News and An Phoblacht. He is the secretary of the Bobby Sands Trust and current chairman of Féile an Phobail, the largest community arts festival in Ireland.

== Biography ==
=== Early life ===
Morrison was born in Andersonstown, a staunchly Irish nationalist district of West Belfast, on 9 January 1953, to Daniel and Susan Morrison. His father worked as a painter at the Harland & Wolff shipyard in East Belfast. The Morrisons were a staunchly republican family originally from Massereene Street in West Belfast. His uncles had been jailed for their part in the IRA's Northern Campaign in the 1940s; one of his uncles was Harry White, a prominent IRA member from a previous generation. Morrison joined Sinn Féin in 1966 and helped to organise 50th anniversary commemorations of the Easter Rising in Belfast. At this time, he later recalled, "as far as we were concerned, there was absolutely no chance of the IRA appearing again. They were something in history books".

=== Provisional IRA ===
After the 1969 Northern Ireland riots, in which nationalist areas of Belfast were attacked and burned, he joined the newly formed Provisional IRA. He believed that "the IRA had been deliberately run down, so that when August 1969 came, there was little or no defence [of nationalist areas]'...[so] a new IRA was built to ensure that nationalists were never left defenceless again". After this, he was engaged in clandestine republican activities, but as late as 1971, was still attending Belfast College of Business Studies and editing a student magazine there. Morrison was interned in Long Kesh in 1972.

=== Political activist ===
Morrison's talents for writing and publicity were quickly recognised within the republican movement and after his release in 1975, Billy McKee, IRA O/C for Belfast, appointed him editor of Republican News. In this journal, he criticised many long-standing policies of the movement, especially the Éire Nua programme which advocated a federal united Ireland with autonomy for Ulster. At this time, he became associated with a grouping of young, left-wing Belfast based republicans, led by Gerry Adams, who wanted to change the strategy, tactics and leadership of the IRA and Sinn Féin. In particular, Morrison believed the IRA's 1975 ceasefire was 'a disaster'. He was especially critical of IRA killings of other republicans and Protestant civilians.

With the rise of Adams' faction in the republican movement in the late 1970s, Morrison succeeded Seán Ó Brádaigh as Director of Publicity for Sinn Féin. During the 1981 Irish hunger strike, Morrison acted as spokesman for the IRA hunger strikers' leader Bobby Sands, who was elected to the British Parliament on an Anti H-Block platform. According to an intermediary between the IRA leadership and the British government, "Danny Morrison, Martin McGuinness and Gerry Adams were the only individuals of sufficient clout to offer the 'persuasion, education and knowledge' to push through any deal" between the strikers and British officials. Blanket protester Richard O'Rawe and others have claimed that Adams, McGuinness and Morrison withheld an offer and subsequent offers from the British which could have ended the hunger strike after the first four deaths, although this is fiercely disputed by Morrison and Sinn Féin.

At the 1981 Sinn Féin Ard Fheis, Morrison made a famous speech in which he called for the party's constitution to be changed. He said: "Who here really believes we can win the war through the ballot box? But will anyone here object if, with a ballot paper in one hand and an Armalite in this hand, we take power in Ireland?" It is from this speech that the term "Armalite and ballot box strategy" derived. The term described the two-pronged approach of the Provisional IRA and Sinn Féin as it sought to advance the republican cause. In reply, Sinn Féin President Ruairí Ó Brádaigh argued that the Ard Fheis should not "swap a slogan for a policy", referring to Éire Nua. Later, at the Ard Fheis in 1982, Morrison said of British Prime Minister Margaret Thatcher, "She's the biggest bastard we have ever known."

Morrison was elected as a Sinn Féin Member for Mid Ulster of a short-lived Northern Ireland Assembly from 1982 to 1986. He also stood unsuccessfully for the European Parliament in 1984, receiving 91,476 votes and again in 1989. He also stood for the Mid Ulster Westminster seat in 1983 and 1986. Morrison, along with Owen Carron, was arrested on 21 January 1982 whilst attempting to enter the United States illegally from Canada by car. Two Canadian supporters also faced charges for trying to smuggle the men in. After spending a week in a federal jail, Morrison was deported and later both men were convicted on a charge of making false statements to US immigration officials.

=== 1990 arrest ===
Morrison was director of publicity for Sinn Féin from 1979 until 1990, when he was charged with false imprisonment, membership of the IRA and conspiracy to murder a double agent in the IRA, Sandy Lynch. He was sentenced to eight years in prison but was released in 1995.

The conviction was referred back to the Court of Appeal by the Criminal Cases Review Commission and the convictions of Morrison and the other defendants were overturned in 2008. According to BBC News, Lord Chief Justice Sir Brian Kerr found the convictions to be unsafe and quashed them. Unusually, the reason was given in a confidential annex, to which Morrison and the others were not allowed access. He claimed that this was because the report contained classified details about double agents working in the IRA and his arrest was a "set-up".

=== Author ===
Since 1989, Morrison has published several novels and plays on themes relating to republicanism and events in the modern history of Belfast. His play, The Wrong Man, opened in London in 2005. It is based on his 1997 book of the same name and deals with the career of an IRA man who is suspected by his colleagues of working for the police.

His first novel, West Belfast, has been described as "significant for its honest portrayal of a conflict which has been written on extensively by outsiders but rarely by the people involved...This is perhaps the first time that a modern Irish Republican has attempted to show in novel form what his community has gone through under British oppression". His second book, On The Back of the Swallow, deals with homosexual relationships, loss and the taboo around such relationships during the conflict in Northern Ireland and the treatment of gay men by the RUC. His latest original work, Rebel Columns, was published in 2004 followed by Hunger Strike, which features contributions, poems and stories from Christy Moore and Ulick O'Connor, with an international view of the hunger strikes from an Iranian man originally published in The Blanket.

The Belfast Telegraph reviewer wrote that his third book, The Wrong Man (1997), "should come to be regarded as one of the most important books of the Troubles", while the Sunday Times called it "a powerful and complex piece of storytelling". The book is discussed in the Oxford Companion to Irish Literature, which describes it as "a powerful evocation of betrayal, deceit and guilt". It was adapted into a play that was produced in London in 2005.

His fourth book, Then the Walls Came Down: A Prison Journal (1999), was described in the Irish Times as "remarkable as a human document" and compared it to Brendan Behan's Borstal Boy. Another review in the same newspaper called it "one of the most important books to emerge from the conflict in Northern Ireland...A vividly humane account of life in prison. The Observer commented that in "post-ceasefire Northern Ireland...the new thinking has come from those involved in the republican war. Danny Morrison's prison memoirs are an honest study of a man seeking fresh solutions to the stalemate the Provos found themselves in at the beginning of the Nineties." The Irish News said it was "invaluable as a rare look at prisoners as human beings."

All the Dead Voices (2002) is a memoir. It was followed by Rebel Columns (2004), a collection of articles. Morrison edited Hunger Strike: Reflections on the 1981 Hunger Strike (2007), which features poems, stories, and reflections on the strike by contributors such as Tony Benn, Edna O'Brien and Christy Moore. The publisher describes the book as follows: "Well-known novelists and poets, former prisoners and activists reflect upon the deaths of the ten republican hunger strikers who died in protest to gain political prisoner status from the British government in Northern Ireland. Their deaths proved a turning point in relations between Britain and Ireland in the early 1980s. Most of the pieces here were specifically commissioned, and while they differ greatly, what they have in common is a sense of the intensity of the experience of the hunger strike at the time, and the intensity of the impression made by it even now."

Morrison lives in West Belfast with his Canadian-born wife, Leslie; he has two sons from his first marriage.

=== The Bobby Sands Trust ===
The Bobby Sands Trust was formed after the 1981 Hunger Strike where ten republican prisoners died due to their hunger strike against the UK Government. The legal firm Madden & Finucane continues to act for the Trust whose original members were Gerry Adams, Danny Morrison, Tom Hartley, Tom Cahill, Marie Moore and Danny Devenny. For a time Sands's two sisters, Marcella and Bernadette, were members of the Trust. Current members are Gerry Adams, Danny Morrison, Tom Hartley, Jim Gibney, Brendan 'Bik' McFarlane, Sile Darragh, Caral Ni Chuilin, and Peter Madden.

The BST claims to hold copyright to all the written works of Bobby Sands. The family of Sands has been critical of the BST and they have called for it to disband. Journalist and author Ed Moloney republished an article he had written for the Sunday Tribune highlighting that Bobby Sands' next of kin wanted to take legal action against the BST. Moloney, with ex-IRA prisoner and journalist Anthony McIntyre, published an open letter to the BST which detailed their challenge to the legality of the trust.

== Select bibliography ==
- 1989 – West Belfast
- 1994 – On the Back of the Swallow
- 1997 – The Wrong Man
- 1999 – Then the Walls Came Down
- 2002 – All the Dead Voices
- 2004 – Rebel Columns
- 2008 – Hunger Strike (editor)
- 2010 – Rudi

== See also ==
- List of Irish writers
- List of writers from Northern Ireland

Northern Ireland Assembly (1982)
New assembly	MPA for Mid-Ulster; 1982–1986	Assembly abolished
Media offices
Preceded by Sean Caughey	Editor of Republican News; 1975–1979	Succeeded by Merged with An Phoblacht
Preceded by Deasún Breathnach	Editor of An Phoblacht; 1979–1982	Succeeded by Mick Timothy
Party political offices
Preceded by Seán Ó Brádaigh	Sinn Féin Director of Publicity; 1979–1990	Succeeded by Rita O'Hare
