= Republican News =

Newspaper/magazine published by Sinn Féin

- Type: Weekly political newspaper
- Publisher: Sinn Féin
- Political alignment: Irish Republican, Socialism
- Language: English, Irish
- Circulation: 20,000

Republican News was a longstanding newspaper/magazine published by Sinn Féin. Following the split in physical force Irish republicanism in the late 1960s between the Officials (Official Sinn Féin — also known as Sinn Féin Gardiner Place — and the Official IRA) and the Provisionals (Provisional Sinn Féin — also known as Sinn Féin Kevin Street and now most commonly simply as Sinn Féin — and the Provisional IRA) Republican News was eclipsed by An Phoblacht, a new magazine launched by Provisional Sinn Féin in 1970. "An Phoblacht" came first and then in early 1970, Joe Graham and Proinsias Mac Airt put together the Republican News and it functioned independently for quite a while. Graham worked on only three issues of it before starting The Vindicator. The magazines merged under the name An Phoblacht/Republican News in 1979.

== Editors ==
1970: Jimmy Steele
1970: Proinsias Mac Airt
1973: Leo Martin
1974: Sean Caughey
1975: Danny Morrison
