= United Ireland (disambiguation) =

A United Ireland is a hypothetical sovereign state comprising the island of Ireland, currently divided between the Republic of Ireland and Northern Ireland.

United Ireland or United Irelander may also refer to

- United Ireland (newspaper) Irish nationalist newspaper (1881–1898) edited by William O'Brien
- United Ireland Party, another name for Fine Gael, an Irish political party founded in 1933. Initially used as its English-language title, it is now a rarely used subtitle.
- United Irish League, Irish nationalist party (1898–1920s) founded by William O'Brien

== See also ==
- United Irishman (disambiguation)
- All-Ireland
- Partition of Ireland
