= Martin Galvin =

American lawyer, publisher, and Irish republican (born 1950)

Martin James Galvin Jr. (born January 8, 1950) is an Irish American lawyer, publisher and activist, and former director of NORAID.

== Background ==
Galvin, the son of Martin James Galvin, a fireman, and Dorothy I. Galvin (née Leonard), attended Catholic schools, Fordham University and Fordham University School of Law. He previously worked as hearing officer for the New York City Department of Sanitation.

== Personal life ==
Galvin and his wife, Carmel, have a son, Martin James Galvin III.

== Political activism ==
Galvin was the publicity director for the New York-based NORAID, an Irish American group fundraising organization which raised money for the families of Irish republican prisoners, but was also accused by the American, British, and Irish governments to be a front for the supply of weapons to the Provisional IRA.

Galvin became a publisher of The Irish People in the 1980s, the American cohort of An Phoblacht. He was banned from Northern Ireland due to a speech endorsing "physical force" Irish republicanism. In August 1984, he defied the ban, and entered Northern Ireland from the Republic of Ireland. The following year, Galvin returned to Northern Ireland to attend a funeral for an IRA volunteer Michael English, who was killed when a makeshift grenade launcher he was trying to fire at a Royal Ulster Constabulary barracks exploded. In 1989 Galvin was arrested and deported for violating the exclusion ban yet again.

Galvin has criticised the Northern Ireland peace process as a betrayal of republican ideals, and characterized the IRA's decision to open up its arms dumps to Independent International Commission on Decommissioning inspectors as a surrender.

On May 28, 2016, he attended a commemoration for PIRA volunteer George McBrearty in Creggan, Derry.
