= Billy McKee =

Founding member and leader of the Provisional IRA

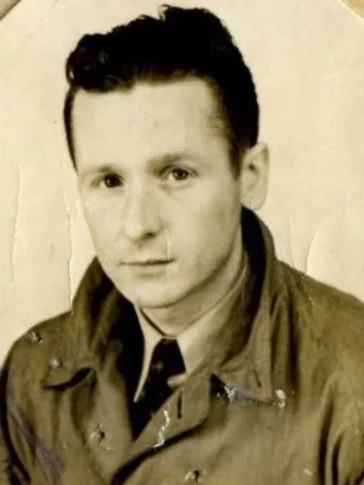
- McKee in 1948

Personal details
- Born: 12 November 1921 Belfast, Northern Ireland
- Died: 11 June 2019 (aged 97) Belfast, Northern Ireland
- Resting place: Milltown Cemetery
- Party: Republican Sinn Féin (from 1986); Sinn Féin (before 1986)
- Known for: Founding and leading the Provisional IRA

Military service
- Allegiance: Irish Republic
- Branch/service: Fianna Éireann (1936–1939) Irish Republican Army (1939–1969) Provisional IRA (1969–1977)
- Rank: Officer Commanding
- Unit: Belfast Brigade
- Battles/wars: Northern Campaign; Border Campaign; The Troubles

Billy McKee (Irish: Liam Mac Aoidh; 12 November 1921 – 11 June 2019) was an Irish republican and a founding member and leader of the Provisional Irish Republican Army.

== Early life ==
McKee was born in Belfast on 12 November 1921, and joined Fianna Éireann in 1936. He was arrested following a raid on a GAA club in 1938, being imprisoned in Crumlin Road Gaol for several months. Following his release from prison, he joined the Irish Republican Army (IRA) in 1939. During the Second World War, the IRA carried out a number of armed actions in Northern Ireland known as the Northern Campaign. McKee was arrested and imprisoned in Crumlin Road Gaol until 1946 for his role in this campaign. In 1956, the IRA embarked on another armed campaign against partition, known as the Border Campaign. McKee was again arrested and interned for the duration of the campaign. He was released in 1962.

Upon release, he became Officer Commanding (OC) of the IRA's Belfast Brigade. However, he resigned this position in 1963, after a dispute with other republicans due to McKee acceding to a Royal Ulster Constabulary (RUC) demand that he not fly an Irish tricolour during a republican march. He was succeeded by Billy McMillen.

As the 1960s went on, McKee drifted away from the IRA. He grew very disillusioned with the organisation's increasing emphasis on socialism and reformist politics over "armed struggle". McKee was a devout Roman Catholic, who attended Mass daily. As a result, he was very uncomfortable with what he felt were "communist" ideas coming into the republican movement.

== IRA split ==
During the Northern Ireland riots of August 1969, severe rioting broke out in Belfast between Irish Catholic nationalists, Protestant loyalists, and the RUC. McKee was highly critical of the IRA's failure to defend Catholic areas during these disturbances. On 14 August 1969 McKee, Joe Cahill and a number of other Irish Republican activists occupied houses at Kashmir Street, however, being poorly armed they failed to prevent Irish Catholics in Bombay Street and parts of Cupar Street and Kashmir Street being driven from their homes in the sectarian rioting that had engulfed parts of the city.

In the aftermath of the riots, McKee accused Billy McMillen, the IRA's Belfast commander, and the Dublin-based IRA leadership, of having failed to direct a clear course of action for the organisation in civil disturbances. On 22 September 1969 McKee and a number of other IRA men arrived with weapons at a meeting called by McMillen and tried to oust him as head of the Belfast IRA. They did not succeed, but announced that they would no longer be taking orders from the IRA leadership in Dublin. In December 1969 the IRA split into the Provisional IRA which was composed of traditional militarists like McKee, and the Official IRA which was composed of the remnants of the pre-split Marxist leadership and their followers. McKee sided with the Provisionals and joined the Army Council in September 1970.

== Provisional IRA ==
McKee became the first OC of the Provisional IRA Belfast Brigade. From the start, there was intermittent feuding between McKee's men and his former comrades in the Official IRA, as they vied for control of nationalist areas. However, the Provisionals rapidly gained the upper hand, due to their projection of themselves as the most reliable defenders of the Catholic community.

McKee himself contributed greatly to this image by an action he undertook on 27 June 1970 (see Battle of St Matthew's). Rioting broke out in the Ardoyne area of north Belfast after an Orange Order parade, and three Protestants were killed in gun battles between the Provisional IRA and loyalists. In response, loyalists prepared to attack the vulnerable Catholic enclave of Short Strand in east Belfast. When McKee heard about this, he drove to Short Strand with some men and weapons and took up position at St Matthew's Church. In the ensuing five-hour gun battle, McKee was wounded and one of his men was killed, along with at least four Protestants.

On 15 April 1971 McKee, along with Proinsias Mac Airt, was arrested by the British Army when found in possession of a hand gun. He was charged and convicted for possession of the weapon and imprisoned in Crumlin Road Prison, and Joe Cahill took over as OC of the Belfast Brigade.

In 1972, McKee led a hunger strike protest in an effort to win recognition of IRA prisoners as political prisoners. Republicans who were interned already had special status, but those convicted of crimes did not. On 19 June (the 35th day of hunger strike) McKee was close to death, William Whitelaw conceded Special Category Status which, although not officially awarding political status, was tacit recognition of the political nature of the incarceration. Prisoners wore their own clothes, had no prison work, could receive one visit and food parcel a week and unlimited letters.

McKee was released on 4 September 1974 and resumed his position as OC of the Belfast Brigade. At this time the Provisional IRA called a ceasefire and McKee was involved, with Ruairí Ó Brádaigh in secret peace talks in Derry with the Northern Ireland Office. He was also involved in talks with Protestant clergy in Feakle, County Clare in December 1974, where he voiced his desire to end the violence.

However, in the same period, McKee authorised a number of sectarian attacks on Protestants as well as renewed attacks on rival republicans in the Official IRA. For this he was heavily criticised by a group of Provisional IRA activists grouped around Gerry Adams.

== Later life ==
A faction led by Adams managed to get McKee voted off the IRA Army Council in 1977, effectively forcing him out of the leadership of the organisation. McKee's health suffered in this period and he did not resume his IRA activities. He joined Republican Sinn Féin after a split in Sinn Féin in 1986. Reflecting on his involvement in the Republican cause at age 89 McKee said: "From the time I was 15 until 65 I was in some way involved. I have had plenty of time since to think if I was right or I was wrong. I regret nothing."

In later years McKee, Brendan Hughes and Tommy McKearney were critical of the Belfast Agreement and of the reformist politics of Sinn Féin. In 2016 he sent a message of support to the launch of the hardline new Republican party Saoradh, reportedly the political wing of the New IRA.

Billy McKee died on 11 June 2019, aged 97. His funeral took place on 15 June 2019 in west Belfast. His coffin was carried on a gun carriage.
