= United Irishman (2000 newspaper) =

The United Irishman was a newspaper published in north Belfast 2000 and produced by those involved in the Official Republican Movement which was a breakaway from The Workers Party in the late 1990s. It included articles by Colm Breathnach and Eamon McCann.
