= Edentubber martyrs =

Five Irish republicans killed in 1957

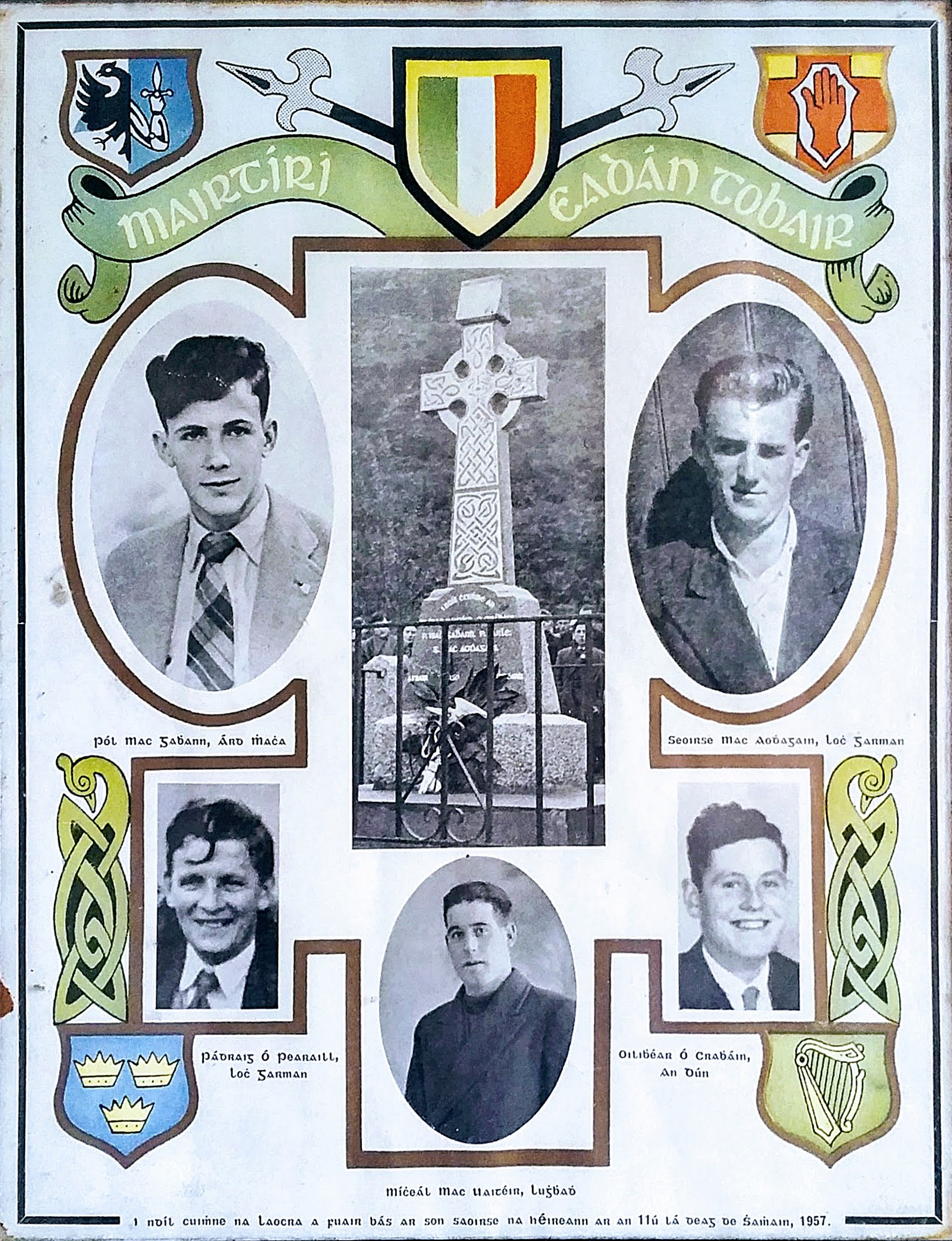
A commemorative print to the five men killed. The Celtic cross in the centre is part of the monument at the site of the explosion in Louth.

The Edentubber Martyrs were five Irish republicans killed on 11 November 1957 during a premature landmine explosion in Edentubber, County Louth, Ireland. According to Tim Pat Coogan, it was the “single biggest disaster of the whole campaign.”

During the Border Campaign, four IRA men were preparing a landmine in a cottage on the side of a hill overlooking the border. The cottage was owned by a fifty-five year-old civilian, Michael Watters, who had allowed them to use his cottage for their operation. The four IRA members were Oliver Craven, Paul Smith, George Keegan and Patrick Parle. The likely cause of the detonation was a malfunction with the timing mechanism, and all five were killed instantly. It was the biggest loss to the IRA since the Irish civil war. Garda Síochána found three Thompson sub-machine guns and magazines at the scene.

They are commemorated annually by Sinn Féin and Republican Sinn Féin.

Prior to the explosion, IRA member Robert Kehoe visited the cottage and told Paul Smith that he thought that the alarm clocks should not be used, but their concerns were dismissed. He said that as they left Paddy Parle was singing “Erin my own lovely land”.

== See also ==
- History of County Louth
