= Seán Cronin =

Irish journalist and IRA chief of staff

Chief of Staff of the IRA
- In office 11 November 1957 – October 1958
- Preceded by: Tony Magan
- Succeeded by: John Joe McGirl
- In office Late May 1959 – June 1960
- Preceded by: Ruairí Ó Brádaigh
- Succeeded by: Ruairí Ó Brádaigh

Personal details
- Born: 29 August 1922 Dublin, Ireland
- Died: 9 March 2011 (aged 88) Washington, D.C., United States
- Occupation: Journalist

Military service
- Branch/service: Defence Forces; Irish Republican Army (1922–1969)
- Battles/wars: Operation Harvest

Seán Cronin (29 August 1922 – 9 March 2011) was a journalist and former Irish Army officer and twice Irish Republican Army chief of staff.

== Biography ==
Cronin was born in Dublin but spent his childhood years in Ballinskelligs, in the County Kerry Gaeltacht.

During the Second World War, Cronin was an officer in the Southern Command in the Irish Defence Forces. He later emigrated to New York City, where he found work as a journalist. In America, he became involved with Clan na Gael and later joined the Irish Republican Army.

In 1955 he returned from the United States and began work as a subeditor in the Evening Press.

He was soon put in charge of training in the IRA. He outlined his ideas in a booklet, Notes on Guerrilla Warfare. He became the chief strategist for the Border Campaign code named Operation Harvest (1956–62), which saw the carrying out a range of military operations from direct attacks on security installations to disruptive actions against infrastructure. Cronin believed that a strong campaign of attacks on police barracks, military installations and government buildings would force the withdrawal of security forces from villages and small towns thereby making large areas of the north ungovernable. He was arrested and imprisoned several times over the course of this campaign.

On two occasions, from 1957 to 1958 and then 1959 to 1960, Cronin was IRA chief of staff. He also served as editor of the Sinn Féin United Irishman newspaper.

Jailed for his activities, he left the IRA in 1962 after his release from prison.

He later became a journalist for The Irish Times, becoming that paper's first Washington, D.C. correspondent, a position he held until 1992.

He was the author of a dozen books and pamphlets, including a biography of republican Frank Ryan, Washington's Irish Policy 1916-1986: Independence, Partition, Neutrality, an authoritative account of Irish-US relations; Our Own Red Blood about the 1916 Easter Rising; and a number of works on guerrilla strategy, including an early Sinn Féin pamphlet Resistance under the pseudonym of J. McGarrity.

After several years of illness, Cronin died in Washington on 9 March 2011. He is survived by his second wife, Reva Rubenstein Cronin.

== Bibliography ==
- Wolfe Tone. Dublin Directory: Wolfe Tone Bi-Centenary, 1963.
- Jemmy Hope: A Man of the People. Scéim na gCeardchumann, 1964.
- The Story of Kevin Barry, with a foreword by Commander-General Tom Barry. The National Publications Committee, 1965. Reprinted by C.F.N. in 1983.
- Our Own Red Blood :The Story of The 1916 Rising. Wolfe Tone Society, 1966 Reprinted 1976 and 2006.
- The Rights of Man in Ireland. Wolfe Tone Society, 1970.
- The Revolutionaries. Republican Publications, 1971.
- Ireland Since The Treaty : fifty years after. Irish Freedom Press, 1971.
- The McGarrity Papers: Revelations of the Irish Revolutionary Movement in Ireland and America, 1900-1940 Anvil Books, 1972.
- Freedom the Wolfe Tone Way Anvil Books, 1973.
- Tone's Republic : The Case Against Sectarianism Wolfe Tone Society, 1975.
- Marx and the Irish Question. Repsol, 1977.
- Frank Ryan : The Search for the Republic. Repsol, 1980.
- Irish Nationalism : a history of its roots and ideology. Academy Press, 1980, US edition, Continuum, 1981.
- Washington's Irish policy 1916-1986 : independence, partition, neutrality. Anvil Books, 1987.
- For Whom the Hangman's Rope was Spun : Wolfe Tone and the United Irishmen. Repsol, 1991.
- James Connolly: Irish Revolutionary. Jefferson, North Carolina: McFarland, 2020

Media offices
Preceded by ?	Editor of the United Irishman ?–1958	Succeeded by Seán Ó Brádaigh
