= United Irishman (1948 newspaper) =

Sinn Féin newspaper

- Front page of the July 1977 edition of the paper
- Type: Monthly newspaper
- Founded: May 1948
- Ceased publication: c. 1980
- Political alignment: Irish republicanism
- Language: English; Irish
- Country: Republic of Ireland; Northern Ireland

The United Irishman/An tÉireannach Aontaithe, first published in May 1948 under Michael Traynor, was the official monthly organ of Sinn Féin sold by its members. At the time of its founding, the paper was strongly supported by prominent Irish Republicans who were no longer active in the Irish Republican Army. After the split in the Irish Republican Movement, the title continued as the organ of Official Sinn Féin, being published from its offices at 30 Gardner Place in Dublin. The Provisional wing published An Phoblacht. The first editor was Seán G. O'Kelly, based in an office at 38 South King Street in Dublin. The historian Éamonn MacThomáis edited the paper for a short while prior to the 1970 split in Sinn Féin.

Other editors of the paper included Seán Cronin, Seán Ó Brádaigh (1958–1960), Ruairí Ó Brádaigh, Eoin Ó Murchú, Jackie Ward, Seamus Ó Tuathail, Denis Foley, and Tony Meade (1967). Contributors to the paper included Eamon McCann, Roy Johnston, Eamon Smullen, Eoghan Harris, and Sean Garland. The United Irishman was replaced with The Irish People and Workers' Weekly in 1980.

It opposed the Republic of Ireland's entry into the European Economic Community.
