= Ruairí Ó Brádaigh =

Irish republican politician and military leader (1932–2013)

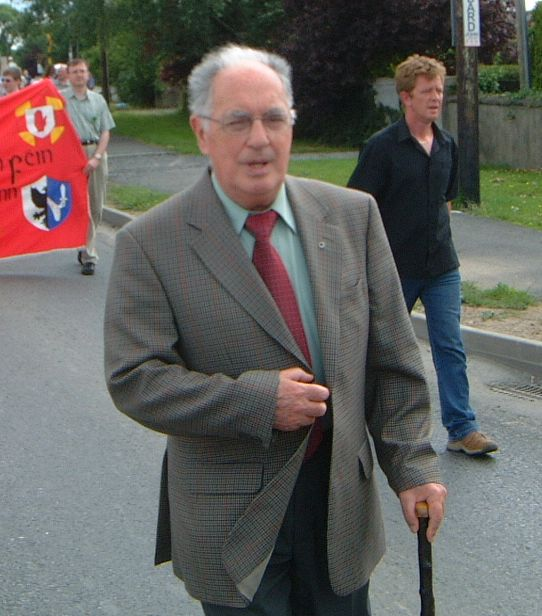
- Ó Bradaigh in 2004

President of Republican Sinn Féin
- In office 1987–2009
- Succeeded by: Des Dalton

President of Sinn Féin
- In office October 1970 – 13 November 1983
- Preceded by: Tomás Mac Giolla
- Succeeded by: Gerry Adams

Teachta Dála
- In office March 1957 – October 1961
- Constituency: Longford–Westmeath

Personal details
- Born: Peter Roger Casement Brady; 2 October 1932 Longford, Ireland
- Died: 5 June 2013 (aged 80) Roscommon, Ireland
- Party: Republican Sinn Féin (after 1986); Sinn Féin (before 1986)
- Spouse: Patsy O'Connor
- Children: 6
- Education: University College Dublin

Military service
- Allegiance: Irish Republic
- Branch/service: Irish Republican Army
- Years of service: 1951–1970
- Rank: Chief of staff
- Battles/wars: Border campaign; The Troubles

Ruairí Ó Brádaigh (IPA: [ˈɾˠuəɾʲiː oː ˈbˠɾˠaːd̪ˠiː]; born Peter Roger Casement Brady; 2 October 1932 – 5 June 2013) was an Irish republican political and military leader. He was Chief of Staff of the Irish Republican Army (IRA) from 1958 to 1959 and again from 1960 to 1962, president of Sinn Féin from 1970 to 1983, and president of Republican Sinn Féin from 1987 to 2009.

== Early life ==
Ó Brádaigh, born Peter Roger Casement Brady, was born into a middle-class republican family in Longford that lived in a duplex home on Battery Road. His father, Matt Brady, was an IRA volunteer who was severely wounded during an attack with the Royal Irish Constabulary in 1919. His mother, May Caffrey, was a Cumann na mBan volunteer and graduate of University College Dublin, class of 1922, with a degree in commerce. His maternal grandmother was a French-speaking Swiss Lutheran.

His father died when he was ten, and was given a paramilitary funeral led by his former IRA colleagues. His mother, prominent as the Secretary for the County Longford Board of Health, lived until 1974. Ó Brádaigh was educated at Melview National School at primary level and attended secondary school at St. Mel's College, leaving in 1950.

In 1954, he graduated from University College Dublin with a commerce degree (BComm), like his mother, and certification in the teaching of the Irish language. That year he took a job teaching Irish at Roscommon Vocational School in Roscommon.

Ó Brádaigh was a deeply religious Catholic who refrained from smoking or drinking.

== Sinn Féin and the Irish Republican Army ==
He joined Sinn Féin in 1950. While at university, in 1951, he joined the Irish Republican Army. In September 1951, he marched with the IRA at the unveiling of the Seán Russell monument in Fairview Park, Dublin. A teacher by profession, he was also a Training Officer for the IRA. In 1954, he was appointed to the Military Council of the IRA, a subcommittee set up by the IRA Army Council in 1950 to plan a military campaign against Royal Ulster Constabulary barracks in Northern Ireland.

On 13 August 1955, Ó Brádaigh led a ten-member IRA group in an arms raid on Hazebrouck Barracks, near Arborfield, Berkshire. It was a depot for the No. 5 Radar Training Battalion of the Royal Electrical and Mechanical Engineers. It was the biggest IRA arms raid in Britain and netted 48,000 rounds of .303 ammunition, 38,000 9 mm rounds, 1,300 rounds for .380 weapons, and 1,300 .22 rounds.

In addition, a selection of arms were seized, including 55 Sten guns, two Bren guns, two .303 rifles and one .38 pistol. Most if not all of the weapons were recovered in a relatively short period of time. A van, travelling too fast, was stopped by the police and IRA personnel were arrested. Careful police work led to weapons that had been transported in a second van and stored in London.

The IRA Border Campaign commenced on 12 December 1956. As an IRA General Headquarters Staff (GHQ) officer, Ó Brádaigh was responsible for training the Teeling Column in the west of Ireland, one of the four armed units prepared for the Campaign. During the Campaign, he served as second-in-command of the Teeling Column.

On 30 December 1956, he partook in the Teeling Column attack on Royal Ulster Constabulary barracks in Derrylin, County Fermanagh. RUC Constable John Scally was killed in the attack. Scally was the first fatality of the new IRA campaign. Ó Brádaigh and others were arrested by the Garda Síochána across the border the day after the attack, in County Cavan. They were tried and jailed for six months in Mountjoy Prison for failing to account for their whereabouts. O'Bradaigh was a leading abstentionist. Upon his arrest he refused to recognize the authority of the Irish government and refused to renounce violence in exchange for his release.

Although a prisoner, he was elected a Sinn Féin Teachta Dála (TD) for the Longford–Westmeath constituency at the 1957 Irish general election, winning 5,506 votes (14.1%). Running on an abstentionist ticket, Sinn Féin won four seats which went to Ó Brádaigh, Eighneachán Ó hAnnluain, John Joe McGirl and John Joe Rice. They refused to recognise the authority of Dáil Éireann and stated they would only take a seat in an all-Ireland parliament—if it had been possible for them to do so. Ó Brádaigh did not retain his seat at the 1961 Irish general election, and his vote fell to 2,598 (7.61%).

Upon completing his prison sentence, he was immediately interned at the Curragh Military Prison, along with other republicans. On 27 September 1958, Ó Brádaigh escaped from the camp with Dáithí Ó Conaill. While a football match was in progress, the pair cut through a wire fence and crept from the camp under a camouflage grass blanket and went "on the run". This was an official escape, authorised by the officer commanding of the IRA internees, Tomás Óg Mac Curtain. He was the first Sinn Féin TD on the run since the 1920s.

That October, Ó Brádaigh became the IRA Chief of Staff, a position he held until May 1959, when an IRA Convention elected Sean Cronin as C/S; Ó Brádaigh became Cronin's adjutant general. Ó Brádaigh was arrested in November 1959, refused to answer questions, and was jailed under the Offences against the State Act in Mountjoy. He was released from Mountjoy in May 1960 and, after Cronin was arrested, he again became C/S. Although he has always emphasised that it was a collective declaration, he was the primary author of the statement ending the IRA Border Campaign in 1962. At the IRA 1962 Convention he indicated that he was not interested in continuing as chief of staff.

After his arrest in December 1956, he took leave from teaching at Roscommon Vocational School. He was re-instated and began teaching again in late 1962, just after he was succeeded by Cathal Goulding in the position of Chief of Staff of the IRA. He remained an active member of Sinn Féin and was also a member of the IRA Army Council throughout the decade.

In the 1966 United Kingdom general election, he ran as an Independent Republican candidate in the Fermanagh and South Tyrone constituency, polling 10,370 votes, or 19.1% of the valid poll. He failed to be elected.

== Leader of Provisional Sinn Féin ==
=== 1970–1973 ===
He opposed the decision of the IRA and Sinn Féin to drop abstentionism and to recognise the Westminster parliament in London, the Stormont parliament in Belfast and the Leinster House parliament in 1969/1970. On 11 January 1970, along with Seán Mac Stíofáin, he led the walkout from the 1970 Sinn Féin Ard Fheis (party conference) after the majority voted to end the policy of abstentionism. The vote to change the Sinn Féin constitution failed as a two-thirds majority was required to do so. The motion only achieved the support of a simple majority of delegates' votes. The delegates who walked out reconvened at the Kevin Barry Hall in Parnell Square, Dublin and established Provisional Sinn Féin.

He was voted chairman of the Caretaker Executive of Provisional Sinn Féin. That October, he formally became president of the party. He held this position until 1983. It is also likely that he served on the Army Council or the executive of the Provisional Irish Republican Army until he was seriously injured in a car accident on 1 January 1984. Among those joining him in Provisional Sinn Féin was his brother, Seán Ó Brádaigh, the first Director of Publicity for Provisional Sinn Féin. Seán Ó Brádaigh continued in this position for almost a decade, when he was succeeded by Danny Morrison, who had been editor of An Phoblacht/Republican News. Sean Ó Brádaigh was the first editor of the paper.

In the 1970s Ó Brádaigh made multiple visits to the Basque Country and considered the Basque independence movement as akin to the Irish situation.

In his presidential address to the 1971 Provisional Sinn Féin Ard Fheis, Ó Brádaigh said that the first step to achieving a United Ireland was to make Northern Ireland ungovernable.

On 31 May 1972 he was arrested under the Offences Against the State Act and immediately commenced a hunger strike. A fortnight later the charges against him were dropped and he was released.

On 3 December 1972, he appeared on the London Weekend Television Weekend World programme. He was arrested by the Gardaí again on 29 December 1972 and charged in the newly established Special Criminal Court with Provisional IRA membership. In January 1973 he was the first person convicted under the Offences Against the State (Amendment) Act 1972 and was sentenced to six months in the Curragh Military Prison.

==== Éire Nua ====
With Dáithí Ó Conaill he developed the Éire Nua (New Ireland) policy, which was launched on 28 June 1972. The policy called for a federal Ireland with a parliament in each of the four Provinces of Ireland with a national parliament to be located in Athlone. Assurances were to be made to Ulster Unionists of a Unionist majority in the Ulster parliament. Initially supported by both the IRA and Sinn Fein, the Eire Nua proposal was dropped in 1982.

=== 1974–1983 ===
In 1974, he testified in person before the United States Senate Committee on Foreign Relations regarding the treatment of IRA prisoners in Ireland. He also had a meeting with prominent Irish-American congressman Tip O'Neill. The same year, the State Department revoked his multiple entry visa and have since refused to allow Ó Brádaigh to enter the country. 1975 Federal Bureau of Investigation documents describe Ó Brádaigh as a "national security threat" and a "dedicated revolutionary undeterred by threat or personal risk" and show that the visa ban was requested by the British Foreign Office and supported by the Dublin government. In 1997, Canadian authorities refused to allow him board a charter flight to Toronto at Shannon Airport.

During the May 1974 Ulster Workers' Council strike, Ó Brádaigh stated that he would like to see "a phased withdrawal of British troops over a number of years, in order to avoid a Congo situation".

On 10 December 1974, he participated in the Feakle talks between the IRA Army Council and Sinn Féin leadership and the leaders of the Protestant churches in Ireland. Although the meeting was raided and broken up by the Gardaí, the Protestant churchmen passed on proposals from the IRA leadership to the British government. These proposals called on the British government to declare a commitment to withdraw, the election of an all-Ireland assembly to draft a new constitution and an amnesty for political prisoners.

The IRA subsequently called a "total and complete" ceasefire intended to last from 22 December to 2 January 1975 to allow the British government to respond to proposals. British government officials also held talks with Ó Brádaigh in his position as president of Sinn Féin from late December to 17 January 1975.

On 10 February 1975, the IRA Army Council, which may have included Ó Brádaigh, unanimously endorsed an open-ended cessation of IRA "hostilities against Crown forces", which became known as the 1975 truce. The IRA Chief of Staff at the time was Seamus Twomey, of Belfast. Another member of the Council at this time was probably Billy McKee, of Belfast. Daithi O'Connell, a prominent Southern Republican, was also a member. It is reported in some quarters that the IRA leaders had mistakenly believed they had persuaded the British Government to withdraw from Ireland and the protracted negotiations between themselves and British officials were the preamble to a public declaration of intent to withdraw.

In fact, as British government papers now show, the British entertained talks with the IRA in the hope that this would fragment the movement further, and scored several intelligence coups during the talks. It is argued by some that by the time the truce collapsed in late 1975 the Provisional IRA had been severely weakened. This bad faith embittered many in the republican movement, and another ceasefire was not to happen until 1994.

In 2005, Ó Brádaigh donated, to the James Hardiman Library of University College, Galway, notes that he had taken during secret meetings in 1975–76 with British representatives. These notes confirm that the British representatives were offering a British withdrawal as a realistic outcome of the meetings. The Republican representatives—Ó Brádaigh, Billy McKee and one other—felt a responsibility to pursue the opportunity, but were also sceptical of British intentions.

In late December 1976, along with Joe Cahill, he met two representatives of the Ulster Loyalist Central Coordinating Committee, John McKeague and John McClure, at the request of the latter body. Their purpose was to try to find a way to accommodate the ULCCC proposals for an independent Northern Ireland with the Sinn Féin's Éire Nua programme. It was agreed that if this could be done, a joint Loyalist-Republican approach could then be made to request the British government to leave Ireland.

Desmond Boal QC and Seán MacBride SC were requested and accepted to represent the loyalist and republican positions. For months they had meetings in various places including Paris. The dialogue eventually collapsed when Conor Cruise O'Brien, then Minister for Posts and Telegraphs and vociferous opponent of the Provisional IRA, became aware of it and condemned it on RTÉ Radio. As the loyalists had insisted on absolute secrecy, they felt unable to continue with the talks as a result.

In the aftermath of the 1975 truce, the Ó Brádaigh/Ó Conaill leadership came under severe criticism from a younger generation of activists from Northern Ireland, headed by Gerry Adams, who became a vice-president of Sinn Féin in 1978. By the early 1980s, Ó Brádaigh's position as president of Sinn Féin was openly under challenge and the Éire Nua policy was targeted in an effort to oust him.

The policy was rejected at the 1981 Sinn Féin Ard Fheis and finally removed from the Sinn Féin constitution at the 1982 Ard Fheis. At the 1983 ard fheis, Ó Brádaigh and Ó Conaill resigned from their leadership positions, voicing opposition to the dropping of the Éire Nua policy by the party.

== Leader of Republican Sinn Féin ==
On 2 November 1986, the majority of delegates to the Sinn Féin Ard Fheis voted to drop the policy of abstentionism if elected to Dáil Éireann, but not the British House of Commons or the Northern Ireland parliament at Stormont, thus ending the self-imposed ban on Sinn Féin elected representatives from taking seats at Leinster House. Ó Brádaigh and several supporters walked out and immediately set up Republican Sinn Féin (RSF); more than 100 people assembled at Dublin's West County Hotel and formed the new organisation. As an ordinary member, he had earlier spoken out against the motion (resolution 162) in an impassioned speech. The Continuity IRA became publicly known in 1996. Republican Sinn Féin's relationship with the Continuity IRA is similar to the relationship between Sinn Féin and the Provisional IRA when Ó Brádaigh was Sinn Féin's president.

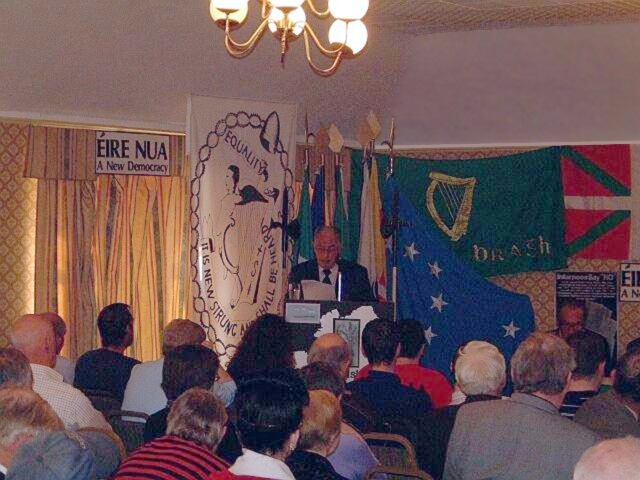
Ruairí Ó Brádaigh speaking at the 2003 RSF Ard Fheis

Ó Brádaigh believed RSF to be the sole legitimate continuation of the pre-1986 Sinn Féin, arguing that RSF has kept the original Sinn Féin constitution. RSF readopted and enhanced Ó Brádaigh's Éire Nua policy between 1988 and 2000. His party has had electoral success in local elections only, although they currently have one elected Councillor in Connemara, County Galway.

He remained a vociferous opponent of the Good Friday Agreement, viewing it as a programme to copperfasten Irish partition and entrench sectarian divisions in the north, condemning his erstwhile comrades in Provisional Sinn Féin and the Provisional IRA for decommissioning weapons while British troops remain in the country. In his opinion, "the Provo sell-out is the worst yet – unprecedented in Irish history". He has condemned the Provisional IRA's decision to seal off a number of its arms dumps as "an overt act of treachery", "treachery punishable by death" under IRA General Army Order Number 11.

In June 2005, he handed over a portion of his personal political papers detailing discussions between Irish Republican leaders and representatives of the British Government during 1974–1975 to the James Hardiman Library, National University of Ireland, Galway.

== Retirement ==
In September 2009, Ó Brádaigh announced his retirement as leader of Republican Sinn Féin. His successor was Des Dalton. Ruairí Ó Brádaigh was also a long-standing member of the Celtic League, an organization which fosters cooperation between the Celtic people and promotes the culture, identity and eventual self-determination for the people, in the form of six sovereign states, for the Celtic nations – Wales, Cornwall, Brittany, Scotland, Isle of Man and Ireland.

== Death ==
After suffering a period of ill-health, Ó Brádaigh died on 5 June 2013 at Roscommon County Hospital. His funeral was attended by 1,800 mourners including Fine Gael TD Frank Feighan and was policed by the Emergency Response Unit and Gardaí in riot gear, for "operational reasons", a show of force believed to have been to deter the republican tradition of firing a three-volley salute of shots over the final place of rest during the graveyard oration. As a result, there was some minor scuffles between gardaí and mourners.

== Writings ==
- Ruairí Ó Brádaigh, What is Irish Republicanism, Dec 1970
- Ruairí Ó Brádaigh, Restore the means of production to the people, Dec 1970
- Ruairí Ó Brádaigh, Our people, our future, Dublin 1973
- Ruairí Ó Brádaigh, Dílseacht – The Story of Comdt General Tom Maguire and the Second (All-Ireland) Dáil, Dublin: Irish Freedom Press, 1997, ISBN 0-9518567-9-0

== See also ==
- List of members of the Oireachtas imprisoned since 1923

== Sources ==
- "Ruairí Ó Brádaigh's speech to the 1986 Sinn Féin Ard Fheis", CAIN Web Service.
- "Transcript of interview" SWR Interview with Ruairi O'Bradaigh
- "Transcript of interview" with Ruairí Ó Brádaigh on the question of the legitimacy of the Republic of Ireland and its institutions on RTÉ Radio 1's News at One programme, 3 March 2002

Media offices
| Preceded by Seán Ó Brádaigh | Editor of the United Irishman; 1958–1960 | Succeeded by Denis Foley |
Party political offices
| Preceded by Tomás Mac Giolla | President of Sinn Féin; 1970–1983 | Succeeded by Gerry Adams |

| Dáil | Election | Deputy (Party) | Deputy (Party) | Deputy (Party) | Deputy (Party) | Deputy (Party) |
|---|---|---|---|---|---|---|
| 2nd | 1921 | Lorcan Robbins (SF) | Seán Mac Eoin (SF) | Joseph McGuinness (SF) | Laurence Ginnell (SF) | 4 seats 1921–1923 |
| 3rd | 1922 | John Lyons (Lab) | Seán Mac Eoin (PT-SF) | Francis McGuinness (PT-SF) | Laurence Ginnell (AT-SF) | 4 seats 1921–1923 |
| 4th | 1923 | John Lyons (Ind.) | Conor Byrne (Rep) | James Killane (Rep) | Patrick Shaw (CnaG) | Patrick McKenna (FP) |
| 5th | 1927 (Jun) | Henry Broderick (Lab) | Michael Kennedy (FF) | James Victory (FF) | Patrick Shaw (CnaG) | Hugh Garahan (FP) |
| 6th | 1927 (Sep) | Henry Broderick (Lab) | Michael Kennedy (FF) | James Killane (FF) | Patrick Shaw (CnaG) | Michael Connolly (CnaG) |
| 6th | 1930 by-election | Henry Broderick (Lab) | Michael Kennedy (FF) | James Geoghegan (FF) | Patrick Shaw (CnaG) | Michael Connolly (CnaG) |
| 7th | 1932 | Francis Gormley (FF) | Michael Kennedy (FF) | James Geoghegan (FF) | Patrick Shaw (CnaG) | Seán Mac Eoin (CnaG) |
| 8th | 1933 | James Victory (FF) | Michael Kennedy (FF) | James Geoghegan (FF) | Charles Fagan (NCP) | Seán Mac Eoin (CnaG) |
| 9th | 1937 | Constituency abolished. See Athlone–Longford and Meath–Westmeath | | | | |

| Dáil | Election | Deputy (Party) | Deputy (Party) | Deputy (Party) | Deputy (Party) | Deputy (Party) |
|---|---|---|---|---|---|---|
| 13th | 1948 | Erskine H. Childers (FF) | Thomas Carter (FF) | Michael Kennedy (FF) | Seán Mac Eoin (FG) | Charles Fagan (Ind.) |
| 14th | 1951 | Erskine H. Childers (FF) | Frank Carter (FF) | Michael Kennedy (FF) | Seán Mac Eoin (FG) | Charles Fagan (Ind.) |
| 15th | 1954 | Erskine H. Childers (FF) | Frank Carter (FF) | Michael Kennedy (FF) | Seán Mac Eoin (FG) | Charles Fagan (FG) |
| 16th | 1957 | Erskine H. Childers (FF) | Ruairí Ó Brádaigh (SF) | Michael Kennedy (FF) | Seán Mac Eoin (FG) | Charles Fagan (FG) |
| 17th | 1961 | Frank Carter (FF) | Joe Sheridan (Ind.) | Michael Kennedy (FF) | Seán Mac Eoin (FG) | 4 seats 1961–1992 |
| 18th | 1965 | Frank Carter (FF) | Joe Sheridan (Ind.) | Patrick Lenihan (FF) | Gerry L'Estrange (FG) | 4 seats 1961–1992 |
| 19th | 1969 | Frank Carter (FF) | Joe Sheridan (Ind.) | Patrick Lenihan (FF) | Gerry L'Estrange (FG) | 4 seats 1961–1992 |
| 19th | 1970 by-election | Frank Carter (FF) | Joe Sheridan (Ind.) | Patrick Cooney (FG) | Gerry L'Estrange (FG) | 4 seats 1961–1992 |
| 20th | 1973 | Frank Carter (FF) | Joe Sheridan (Ind.) | Patrick Cooney (FG) | Gerry L'Estrange (FG) | 4 seats 1961–1992 |
| 21st | 1977 | Albert Reynolds (FF) | Joe Sheridan (Ind.) | Seán Keegan (FF) | Gerry L'Estrange (FG) | 4 seats 1961–1992 |
| 22nd | 1981 | Albert Reynolds (FF) | Patrick Cooney (FG) | Seán Keegan (FF) | Gerry L'Estrange (FG) | 4 seats 1961–1992 |
| 23rd | 1982 (Feb) | Albert Reynolds (FF) | Patrick Cooney (FG) | Seán Keegan (FF) | Gerry L'Estrange (FG) | 4 seats 1961–1992 |
| 24th | 1982 (Nov) | Albert Reynolds (FF) | Patrick Cooney (FG) | Mary O'Rourke (FF) | Gerry L'Estrange (FG) | 4 seats 1961–1992 |
| 25th | 1987 | Albert Reynolds (FF) | Patrick Cooney (FG) | Mary O'Rourke (FF) | Henry Abbott (FF) | 4 seats 1961–1992 |
| 26th | 1989 | Albert Reynolds (FF) | Louis Belton (FG) | Mary O'Rourke (FF) | Paul McGrath (FG) | 4 seats 1961–1992 |
| 27th | 1992 | Constituency abolished. See Longford–Roscommon and Westmeath | | | | |

| Dáil | Election | Deputy (Party) | Deputy (Party) | Deputy (Party) | Deputy (Party) | Deputy (Party) |
|---|---|---|---|---|---|---|
| 30th | 2007 | Willie Penrose (Lab) | Peter Kelly (FF) | Mary O'Rourke (FF) | James Bannon (FG) | 4 seats 2007–2024 |
| 31st | 2011 | Willie Penrose (Lab) | Robert Troy (FF) | Nicky McFadden (FG) | James Bannon (FG) | 4 seats 2007–2024 |
| 31st | 2014 by-election | Willie Penrose (Lab) | Robert Troy (FF) | Gabrielle McFadden (FG) | James Bannon (FG) | 4 seats 2007–2024 |
| 32nd | 2016 | Willie Penrose (Lab) | Robert Troy (FF) | Kevin "Boxer" Moran (Ind.) | Peter Burke (FG) | 4 seats 2007–2024 |
| 33rd | 2020 | Sorca Clarke (SF) | Robert Troy (FF) | Joe Flaherty (FF) | Peter Burke (FG) | 4 seats 2007–2024 |
| 34th | 2024 | Sorca Clarke (SF) | Robert Troy (FF) | Kevin "Boxer" Moran (Ind.) | Peter Burke (FG) | Micheál Carrigy (FG) |
