= Border campaign (Irish Republican Army) =

1956–62 conflict between the IRA and the UK

Border campaign (Operation Harvest)
- Notable sites of conflict during the campaign
Date	12 December 1956 – 26 February 1962 (5 years, 2 months and 2 weeks)
Location	Mainly Irish border
Result	British victory: IRA campaign fails, hundreds of republicans interned

Belligerents
Irish Republican Army	United Kingdom: British Army; Royal Ulster Constabulary; Ulster Special Constabulary

Commanders and leaders
IRA Army Council; Seán Cronin; Ruairí Ó Brádaigh	Insp.-Gen. Sir Richard Pim; Insp.-Gen. Sir Albert Kennedy (from 1961)

Strength
~Around 200 Volunteers	(United Kingdom) Several thousand troops 2,800 12,500+

Casualties and losses
8 IRA men killed, 4 republican civilians killed Over 400 republicans interned in Northern Ireland, ~150 republicans interned in Republic of Ireland	6 RUC constables killed, 32 wounded

The border campaign (12 December 1956 – 26 February 1962) was a guerrilla warfare campaign (codenamed Operation Harvest) carried out by the Irish Republican Army (IRA) against targets in Northern Ireland, with the aim of overthrowing British rule there and creating a united Ireland. It was also referred to as the "resistance campaign" by some Irish republican activists. The campaign was a military failure, but some of its members felt it was justified, as it kept the IRA engaged for another generation.

== Background ==
The border campaign was the first major military undertaking carried out by the IRA since the 1940s, when the harsh security measures of the Republic of Ireland and Northern Ireland governments had severely weakened it. In 1939-40 the IRA carried out a sabotage/bombing campaign in England (the S-Plan) to try to force British withdrawal from Northern Ireland. The final figures resulting from the S-Plan are cited as 300 explosions, ten deaths and 96 injuries. From 1942 to 1944 it also mounted an ineffective campaign in Northern Ireland. Internment on both sides of the border, as well as internal feuding and disputes over future policy, all but destroyed the organisation. These campaigns were officially called off on 10 March 1945. By 1947, the IRA had only 200 activists, according to its own general staff.

In principle, the IRA wished to overthrow both "partitionist" states in Ireland, both Northern Ireland and the Irish Free State, both of which it deemed to be illegitimate entities imposed by Britain at the time of the Anglo-Irish Treaty in 1922. However, in 1948 a General Army Convention issued General Order No. 8, prohibiting "any armed action whatsoever" against the forces of the recently proclaimed Republic of Ireland, amounting to a de facto recognition of the state. Under the new policy, IRA volunteers who were caught with arms in the Republic of Ireland were ordered to dump or destroy them and not to take defensive action.

From then on, armed action was focused on Northern Ireland, which was still part of the United Kingdom and which was dominated by Protestant unionists. The idea of a campaign launched from the Republic against Northern Ireland, first mooted by Tom Barry in the 1930s, gained currency within IRA circles as the 1950s went on. In 1954, after an arms raid at Gough Barracks in Armagh, a speaker at the Wolfe Tone commemoration at Bodenstown repeated that IRA policy was directed solely against British forces in Northern Ireland.

IRA Chief of Staff Tony Magan set out to create "a new Army, untarnished by the dissent and scandals of the previous decade," according to J. Bowyer Bell. One of its advisers was a retired British Major-General, Eric Dorman-Smith. The IRA was officially "apolitical," existing only to overthrow the "British-imposed political institutions" in Ireland. However Magan believed that a degree of political mobilisation was necessary and the relationship with Sinn Féin which had soured during the 30s was improved. At the 1949 IRA Convention, the IRA ordered its members to join Sinn Féin, which would partially become the "civilian wing" of the IRA.

== Re-arming ==
By the middle of this decade, moreover, the IRA had substantially re-armed. This was achieved by means of arms raids launched between 1951 and 1954, on British military bases in Northern Ireland and England. Arms were taken from Derry, Omagh, Essex, Berkshire and Armagh. At the latter raid on Gough barracks in Armagh in June 1954, the IRA seized 250 Lee–Enfield rifles, 37 submachine guns, nine Bren guns and 40 training rifles. On 25 July 1953, there was an IRA arms raid on the armoury of the Officer Training Corps at Felsted, a private school in Essex. In that raid, the IRA netted over 108 rifles, ten Bren and eight Sten guns, two mortars and dummy mortar bombs. The police seized the van carrying the stolen weapons some hours later.

By 1955, splits were occurring in the IRA, as several small groups, impatient for action, launched their own attacks in Northern Ireland. One such activist, Brendan O'Boyle blew himself up with his own bomb in the summer of that year. Another, Liam Kelly founded a breakaway group Saor Uladh ("Free Ulster") and in November 1955, attacked a Royal Ulster Constabulary (RUC) barracks at Roslea in County Fermanagh. One RUC man was badly injured and Saor Uladh volunteer Connie Green was killed in the incident. In August of the following year, Kelly and another IRA dissident, Joe Christle, burned down some customs posts on the border.

In November 1956, the IRA finally began its own border campaign. They were partly motivated by a desire to prevent any more splits in their organisation. They were also encouraged by the results of the UK general election of 1955, when Sinn Féin (since 1949, largely dominated by IRA members) candidates were elected MPs for the Mid-Ulster and Fermanagh and South Tyrone constituencies in Northern Ireland, with a total of 152,310 votes. This appeared to show that there was a substantial Irish republican support base within Northern Ireland. However, as the mainstream Nationalist Party had decided not to take part in the election, its supporters had voted for Sinn Féin instead.

== Planning the campaign ==
The plan for the border campaign – codenamed "Operation Harvest" – was devised by Seán Cronin. It envisaged the use of guerrilla units called flying columns, initially four units of about 50 men each. They were to operate from within the Republic of Ireland and to attack military and infrastructural targets within Northern Ireland. Cronin believed that a strong campaign of attacks on RUC barracks, military installations and government buildings would force the withdrawal of security forces from townlands, villages and small towns, thereby making large parts of the north ungovernable. In addition, another twenty organisers were sent to various locations within Northern Ireland to train new units, gather intelligence and report back to the leadership in Dublin. An IRA document probably seized in Dublin in a raid on Cronin's flat, on 8 January 1957, stated that the aim of the campaign was to: "break down the enemy's administration in the occupied area until he is forced to withdraw his forces. Our method of doing this is guerrilla warfare within the occupied area and propaganda directed at its inhabitants. In time as we build up our forces, we hope to be in a position to liberate large areas and tie these in with other liberated areas – that is areas where the enemy's writ no longer runs".

No actions were to take place in Belfast, the capital and biggest city in Northern Ireland. It was excluded because Paddy Doyle, the Belfast operational commander and a member of the Army Council, was arrested and the unit was disorganised, although Hanley and Millar attribute the non-participation of the Belfast IRA to fears that informers had access to the IRA's plans. There was also a desire not to provoke reprisals by loyalists against the Catholic/nationalist population there. This had happened on a large scale in 1920–22, during and after the Irish War of Independence.

== The campaign ==
=== 1956 ===
On 12 December, the campaign was launched with simultaneous attacks by around 150 IRA members on targets on the Border in the early hours. A BBC relay transmitter was bombed in Derry, a courthouse was burned in Magherafelt by a unit led by an 18-year-old Seamus Costello, as was a B-Specials post near Newry and a half-built Army barracks at Enniskillen was blown up. A raid on Gough barracks in Armagh was beaten off after a brief exchange of fire.

The IRA issued a statement announcing the start of the campaign, "Spearheaded by Ireland's freedom fighters, our people have carried the fight to the enemy...Out of this national liberation struggle a new Ireland will emerge, upright and free. In that new Ireland, we shall build a country fit for all our people to live in. That then is our aim: an independent, united, democratic Irish Republic. For this we shall fight until the invader is driven from our soil and victory is ours". Despite formal condemnation of the IRA by the Roman Catholic hierarchy, many units were given absolution before going out on operation. On 14 December: an IRA column under Seán Garland detonated four bombs (one of which blew in the front wall) outside Lisnaskea RUC station before raking it with gunfire. Further attacks on Derrylin and Roslea RUC barracks on the same day were beaten off. On 21 December: In response to the statement the government of Northern Ireland under Basil Brooke used the Special Powers Act to intern several hundred republican suspects without trial. Over 100 men were arrested on 12 January 1957. This, in time, severely limited the IRA's capacity to build up units within Northern Ireland. On the evening of 30 December, the Teeling Column under Noel Kavanagh attacked the Derrylin RUC barracks again, killing RUC constable John Scally, the first fatality of the campaign. Others involved in that attack included two prominent IRA men, Charlie Murphy and Ruairí Ó Brádaigh.

=== 1957 ===
The year 1957 was the most active year of the IRA's campaign, with 341 incidents recorded.

The most dramatic attack of the whole campaign took place on 1 January: 14 IRA volunteers, including Séan Garland, Alan O Brien, Paddy O'Regan and Dáithí Ó Conaill planned an attack on a joint RUC/B Specials barracks in Brookeborough, County Fermanagh, though they attacked the wrong building. During the attack a number of volunteers were injured including Séan Garland. Fergal O'Hanlon and Seán South died of their wounds as they were making their escape. The remainder of the group were pursued back over the border by 400 RUC, B Specials and British soldiers. The funerals of South and O'Hanlon in the Republic produced a strong emotional reaction among the general public there. The two men are still considered martyrs in Irish Republican circles. Up to 50,000 people attended their funerals.

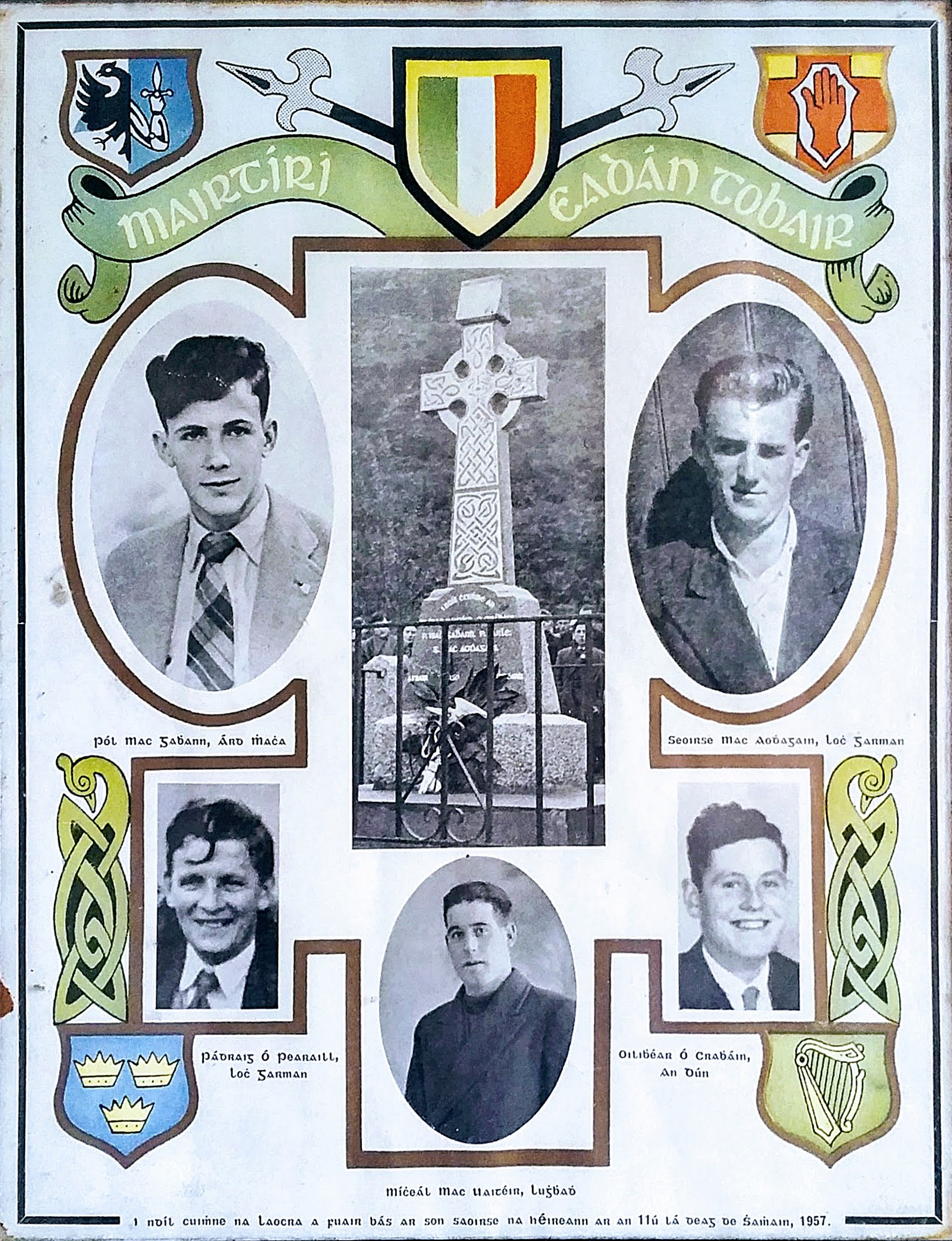
Commemorative plaque to the Edentubber Martyrs, killed in November 1957

Shortly afterwards, the Republic's government, led by John Costello of Fine Gael, feared that the IRA's action would drag it into a diplomatic confrontation with Britain. It used the Offences Against the State Act to arrest most of the IRA's leadership, including its chief of staff, Seán Cronin. The republican Clann na Poblachta party, led by former IRA Chief of Staff Seán MacBride, withdrew its support for the government in protest over this policy. In the ensuing Irish general election, 1957, Sinn Féin won four seats and polled 65,640 votes (c. 5% of those cast), while Clann na Poblachta's vote dropped sharply. However, Clann na Poblachta were very weak originally in the constituencies where Sinn Féin fielded candidates.

The new government, of Fianna Fáil, led by Éamon de Valera proved even more hostile to the IRA than its predecessor. In July 1957, after the killing of an RUC man, de Valera introduced wholesale internment without trial for IRA suspects. The use of internment on both sides of the Irish border made it impossible for the IRA, most of whose leadership was imprisoned, to maintain the momentum of their campaign.

On 11 November: The IRA suffered its worst loss of life in the period when four of its members died preparing a bomb in a farm house at Edentubber, County Louth, which exploded prematurely. The civilian owner of the house was also killed. It is believed they were going to attack an empty customs post and electricity pylons in Northern Ireland. They would later be referred to by republicans as the "Edentubber Martyrs".

=== 1958 – 1960 ===
By 1958, the campaign's initial impetus had largely dissipated. Certain IRA activities produced public hostility and by 1958, there were already many within the IRA in favour of calling the campaign off. The Cork IRA, for instance, had effectively withdrawn. By mid-1958, 500 republicans were in jail or interned, North and South. The decline in activity meant that the Fianna Fáil government in the South felt confident enough to end internment in March 1959. Following their release, some of the interned leaders met Sean Cronin in a farmhouse in County Laois and were persuaded to continue the campaign "to keep the flame alive".

In 1960, the number of incidents fell to just 26. Moreover, many of these actions consisted of minor acts of sabotage, for example the cratering of roads. Wallace Clark recalled that by this stage the campaign resembled a 'phoney war' at times, as 'casualties remained providentially light' and normal life carried on 'almost uninterrupted'.

In the summer of 1958, two IRA men were killed in separate gun battles with the RUC on the border in County Fermanagh, Aloysius Hand in July and James Crossan in August. On 15–17 July 1958 explosions were carried out along the length of the border from counties Down to Londonderry resulting in the destruction of the largest border customs post at Killean, County Armagh on the main Dundalk-Belfast road. The period after the summer of 1958 saw a steep drop in the intensity of the IRA campaign. That the IRA's campaign had run its course by 1960 is testified by the fact that the Republic of Ireland's government closed the Curragh Camp, which housed internees in the South, on 15 March 1959 (judging them to be no further threat). The Northern Irish government followed suit on 25 April 1961.

=== 1961 ===
In November 1961, an RUC officer, William Hunter, was killed in a gun battle with the IRA in south County Armagh. This was the final fatality of the conflict. Minister for Justice, Charles Haughey reactivated the Special Criminal Court, which handed down long prison sentences to convicted IRA men.

== End of the campaign ==
By late 1961, the campaign was over. It had cost the lives of eight IRA men, four republican supporters and six RUC members. In addition, 32 RUC members were wounded. A total of 256 Republicans were interned in Northern Ireland in this period and another 150 or so in the Republic. Of those in Northern Ireland, 89 had signed a pledge to renounce violence in return for their freedom.

Although it had faded away by the late 1950s, the campaign was officially called off on 26 February 1962. In a press release issued that day, drafted by Ruairí Ó Brádaigh who consulted with several other persons including members of the Army Council, the IRA Army Council stated:

The leadership of the Resistance Movement has ordered the termination of the Campaign of Resistance to British occupation launched on 12 December 1956. Instructions issued to Volunteers of the Active Service Units and of local Units in the occupied area have now been carried out. All arms and other matériel have been dumped and all full-time active service volunteers have been withdrawn... Foremost among the factors motivating this course of action has been the attitude of the general public whose minds have been deliberately distracted from the supreme issue facing the Irish people – the unity and freedom of Ireland. The Irish resistance movement renews its pledge of eternal hostility to the British Forces of Occupation in Ireland. It calls on the Irish people for increased support and looks forward with confidence – in co-operation with the other branches of the Republican Movement – to a period of consolidation, expansion and preparation for the final and victorious phase of the struggle for the full freedom of Ireland.

The statement was released by the Irish Republican Publicity Bureau and signed "J. McGarrity, Secretary."

Implicit in the statement was a recognition that the IRA, after a promising start in 1957, had failed to mobilise much popular support behind its campaign.

== In popular culture ==
- In 2007, the campaign was the subject of a TG4 documentary.
- The campaign was referenced in the episode "The Sanctuary" of Danger Man, in John Drake's attempt to uncover an IRA cell.
- In 2020, the campaign formed the backdrop of the crime thriller Blackwatertown by Paul Waters, published by Unbound in paperback and ebook and W.F. Howes now RBMedia in audiobook.
- The 1 January 1957 attack on the joint RUC/B Specials barracks in Brookeborough, County Fermanagh is referenced in the song Sean South of Garyowen.

== Aftermath ==
The border campaign was considered a disaster by some IRA members, not least because it enjoyed practically no support from the nationalist population of Northern Ireland. Even before the campaign ended some within the organisation had begun to consider other avenues in pursuit of the organisation's goals. Many of those involved with the border campaign felt that their lack of support was due to a failure to address the social and economic issues faced by ordinary people. The early seeds of addressing such issues are found in Sinn Féin election materials in the late 1950s and early 1960s.

The larger unionist population in Northern Ireland was further alienated from Irish republicanism by the campaign, and considered that its internment policy had worked. However, the policy was to fail when it was repeated in the 1970s.

Cathal Goulding, who became IRA chief of staff in 1962, tried to move the IRA away from pure militarism and towards left wing and ultimately Marxist politics. This process ended with the 1969/70 split in the republican movement between the Official IRA and Provisional IRA wings. The Officials, under Goulding wanted to transform the movement into a revolutionary party involved in both parliamentary and street politics, while the Provisionals under Ruairí Ó Brádaigh, wanted to maintain the movement's traditional refusal to engage in parliamentary politics. More immediately, the Provisional faction wanted to use armed force to defend the Catholic community in Belfast from loyalist attacks in the civil strife that had broken out in Northern Ireland (the start of "The Troubles"), but the Official IRA, as led by Goulding, also engaged as Belfast defenders. A key difference is that, ultimately, the Provisionals also wanted to re-build the IRA's military capacity to launch a new armed campaign.

The Officials and Provisionals went their separate ways in 1969. The Official IRA maintained armed actions up until 1972, but characterised them as "defensive". Feuds between the two IRAs in the 1970s claimed about twenty lives. The Provisional IRA launched what turned out to be a much more sustained and destructive campaign than the border campaign – the Provisional IRA campaign 1969–1997, which was to claim up to 1,800 lives.
