= Emile Wauters =

Belgian painter

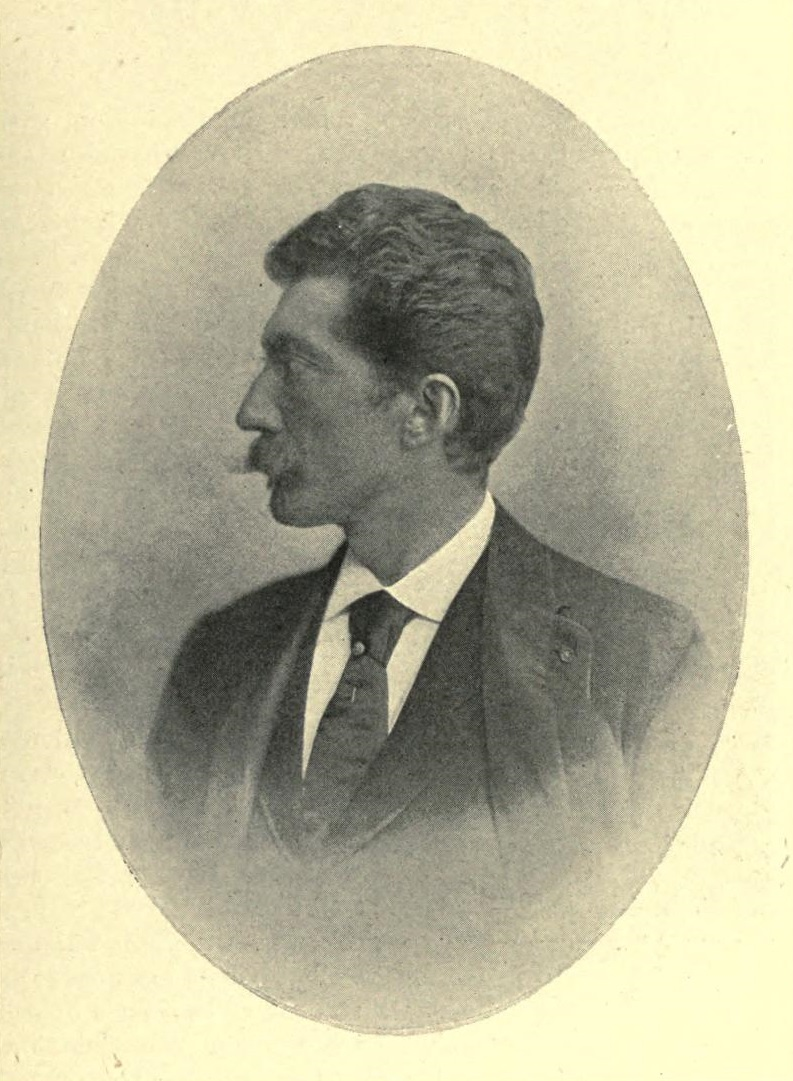
- Emile Wauters, by J. Ganz.
- Born: Emile Wauters; 19 November 1846
- Died: 11 December 1933 (aged 87) n/a
- Occupation: Painter

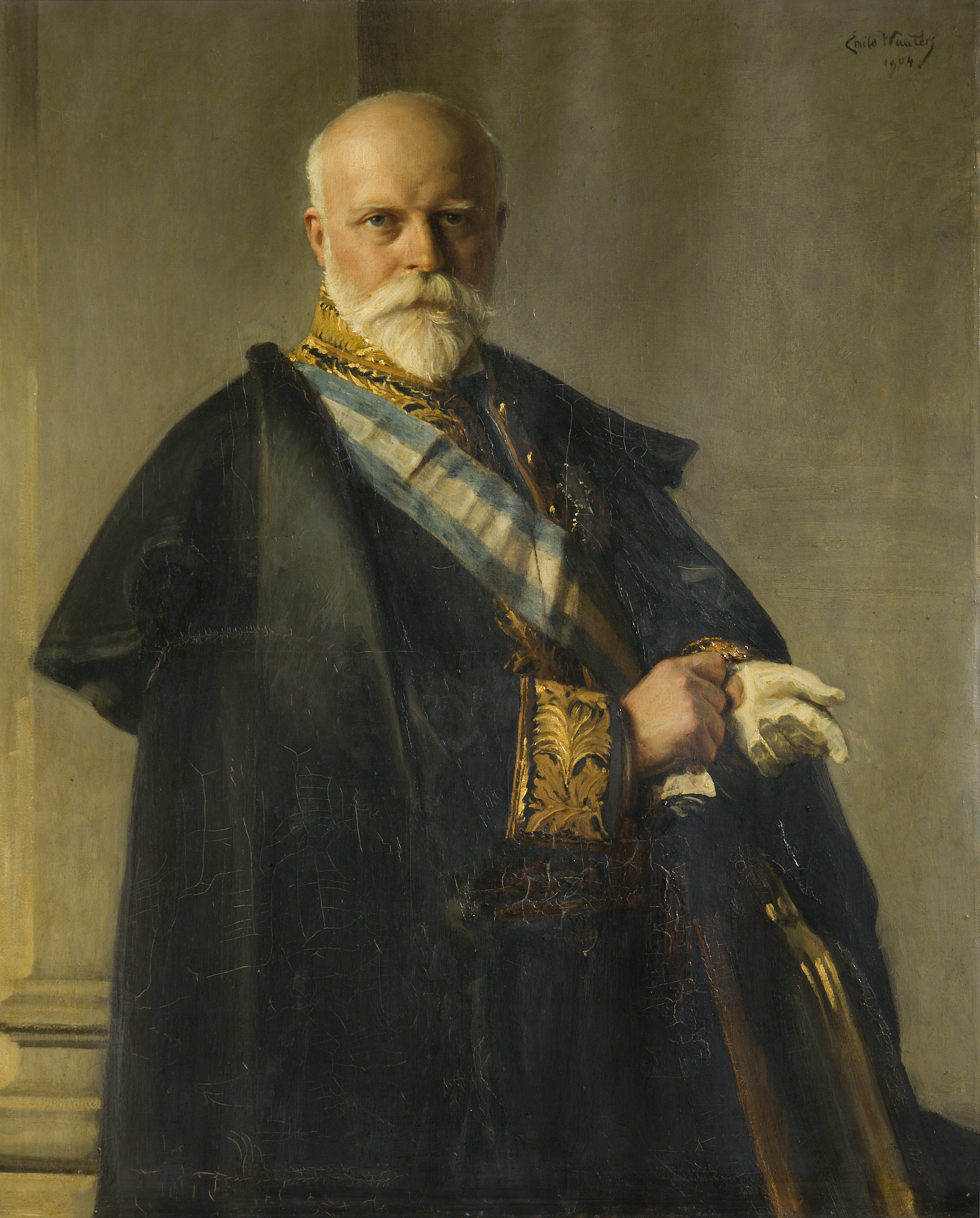
The 6th Duke d'Ursel painted by Emile Wauters, Collection of the Belgian Senate, Brussels.

Emile Wauters (19 November 1846 – 11 December 1933) was a Belgian painter. He was born in Brussels. Successively the pupil of Portaels and Jean-Léon Gérôme, he produced in 1868 The Battle of Hastings: the Finding of the body of Harold by Edith.

== Biography ==
Wauters made a journey to Italy, but that the study of the old masters in no way affected his individuality was proved by The Great Nave of St. Marks (purchased by Leopold II of Belgium). As his youth disqualified him for the medal of the Brussels Salon, which otherwise would have been his, he was sent, by way of compensation, by the minister of fine arts, as artist-delegate to Suez for the opening of the canal, a visit that was fruitful later on.

In 1870, when he was yet only twenty-two years of age, Wauters exhibited his great historical picture of Mary of Burgundy entreating the Sheriffs of Ghent to pardon the Councillors Hugonet and Humbercourt (Liege Museum) which created a veritable furore, an impression which was confirmed the following year at the London International Exhibition. It was eclipsed by the celebrated Madness of Hugo van der Goes (1872, Brussels Museum), a picture which led to the commission for the two large works decorating the Lions staircase of the Hotel de Ville Mary of Burgundy swearing to respect the Communal Rights of Brussels, 1477 and The Armed Citizens of Brussels demanding the Charta from Duke John IV, Duke of Brabant. His other large compositions comprise Sobieski and his Staff before Besieged Vienna (Brussels Museum) and the Harvest of a journey to Spain and Tangiers, The Great Mosque, and Serpent Charmers of Sokko, and a souvenir of his Egyptian travel, Cairo, from the Bridge of Kasr-el-Nil (Antwerp Museum).

His vast panorama Cairo and the Banks of the Nile (1881), 380 ft. by 49 ft., executed in six months, was exhibited with extraordinary success in Brussels, Munich, and The Hague.

== Oeuvre ==
Wauters was also praised as a portraitist, in his earliest period exhibiting, as in his pictures, sober qualities and subtle grip, but later on developing into the whole range of a brilliant, forceful palette, and then into brighter and more delicate colors, encouraged thereto, in his more recent work, by his adoption of pastel as a medium even for life-size portraits, mainly of ladies.

His portraits, numbering over two hundred, depict subjects of great acknowledgement, from countries such as Belgium, France, and America (Wauters having for some years made Paris his chief home). Among these may be named the Baron Goffinet, the Baroness Goffinet, Madame Somze (standing at a piano), Master Somze (on horseback by the sea-shore), the Princess Clementine of Belgium (Brussels Museum), Lady Edward Sassoon, Baron de Bleichroder, Princess de Ligne, Miss Lorillard, a likeness of the artist in the Dresden Museum, and M. Schollaert (president of the Chamber of Deputies).

== Prizes ==
Between 1889 and 1900 the painter contributed to the Royal Academy of London. Few artists have received such a succession of noteworthy distinctions and recognitions. His Hugo van der Goes, the work of a youth of twenty-four, secured the Grand Medal of the Salon. He has been awarded no fewer than six medals of honor at Paris in 1878 and 1889; Munich, 1879; Antwerp, 1885; Vienna, 1888; and Berlin, 1883.

== Honours ==
- 1887: Commander in the Order of Leopold
- 1924: Grand Cross in the Order of the Crown
- Commander in the Order of Saint Michael
- Officer in the Legion of Honour
- Order of Merit of Prussia
- Knight in the Order of Franz Joseph
- Member of the Royal Academy of Science, Letters and Fine Arts of Belgium

He was an honorary member of the Vienna, Berlin, and Munich academies, and corresponding member of the Institut de France and of that of Madrid.

== Sources ==
- P. & V. Berko, "Dictionary of Belgian painters born between 1750 & 1875", Knokke 1981, pp. 789–791.
- M. H. Spielmann, Magazine of Art (1887); A. J. Wauters, Magazine of Art (1894); Joseph Anderson, Pall Mall Magazine (1896); G. Sera (Wauters as a Painter of Architecture) Architectural Record (1901).
