= George Noble Plunkett =

Irish nationalist politician and museum curator (1851–1948)

Count George Noble Plunkett KHS
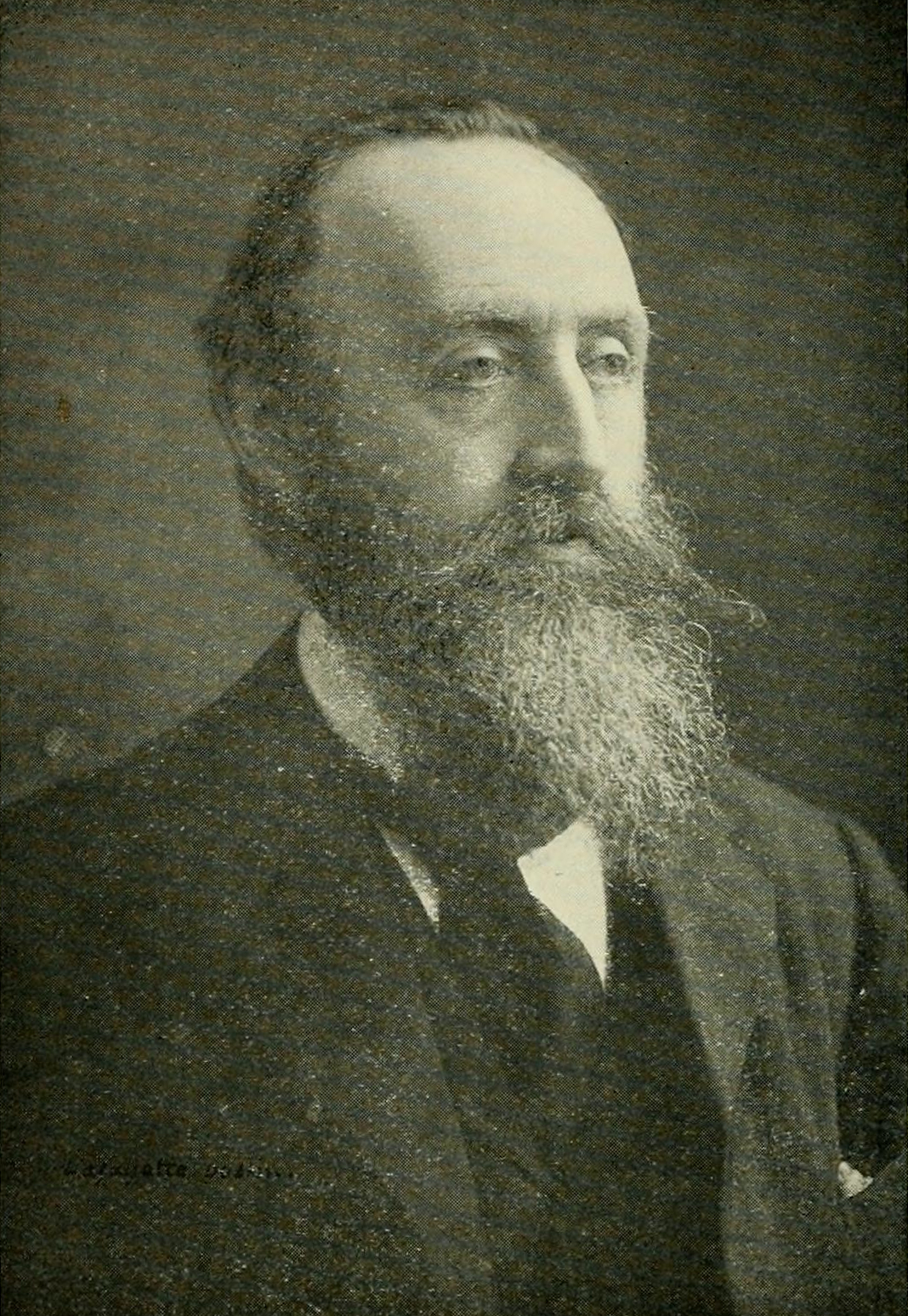
- Plunkett, c. 1915

Minister for Fine Arts
- In office 26 August 1921 – 9 January 1922
- President: Éamon de Valera
- Preceded by: New office
- Succeeded by: Office abolished

Minister for Foreign Affairs
- In office 22 January 1919 – 26 August 1921
- President: Éamon de Valera
- Preceded by: New office
- Succeeded by: Arthur Griffith

Ceann Comhairle of Dáil Éireann
- In office 22 January 1919 – 22 January 1919
- Deputy: John J. O'Kelly
- Preceded by: Cathal Brugha
- Succeeded by: Seán T. O'Kelly

Teachta Dála
- In office August 1923 – June 1927
- Constituency: Roscommon
- In office May 1921 – August 1923
- Constituency: Leitrim–Roscommon North
- In office December 1918 – May 1921
- Constituency: Roscommon North

Member of Parliament
- In office February 1917 – November 1922
- Preceded by: James O'Kelly
- Succeeded by: Office abolished
- Constituency: Roscommon North

Personal details
- Born: George Noble Plunkett; 3 December 1851 Dublin, Ireland
- Died: 12 March 1948 (aged 96) Dublin, Ireland
- Party: Sinn Féin (1917 onwards)
- Other political affiliations: Independent (1917)
- Spouse: Josephine Cranny (m. 1881)
- Children: 7, including Joseph, George, and Fiona
- Education: Trinity College Dublin

Count George Noble Plunkett (3 December 1851 – 12 March 1948) was an Irish nationalist politician, museum director and biographer, who served as Minister for Fine Arts from 1921 to 1922, Minister for Foreign Affairs from 1919 to 1921 and Ceann Comhairle of Dáil Éireann in January 1919. He served as a Teachta Dála (TD) from 1918 to 1927. He was a Member of Parliament (MP) for Roscommon North from 1917 to 1922.

He was the father of Joseph Plunkett, one of the leaders of the Easter Rising of 1916, as well as George Oliver Plunkett, Fiona Plunkett and John (Jack) Plunkett who also fought during the rising and subsequently during the Irish revolutionary period.

== Early life and family ==
Plunkett was part of the prominent Irish Norman Plunkett family, which included Saint Oliver Plunkett (1629–1681). George's relatives included the Earls of Fingall—his great-grandfather George Plunkett (1750–1824) was "in the sixth degree removed in relationship" (fifth cousin) to the 8th Earl of Fingall—and the Barons of Dunsany, whose line had conformed to the Church of Ireland in the eighteenth century. One of that line, Sir Horace Curzon Plunkett, had served as Unionist MP for South Dublin (1892–1900) but became a convinced Home Rule supporter by 1912 as an alternative to the partition of Ireland, and served as a member of the first Irish Free State Senate (1922–1923).

Born in 1851 at 1 Aungier Street, Dublin, Plunkett was the son of Patrick Joseph Plunkett (1817–1918), a builder, and Elizabeth Noble (Plunkett). The family income allowed Plunkett to attend school in Nice in France, then at Clongowes Wood College and Trinity College Dublin. In Dublin he studied Renaissance and medieval art, among other topics, ultimately graduating in 1884. Plunkett spent much time abroad, primarily in Italy.

=== Titles ===
In 1884, he was created a Papal Count by Pope Leo XIII for donating money and property to the Sisters of the Little Company of Mary, a Roman Catholic nursing order. He was a Knight Commander of the Equestrian Order of the Holy Sepulchre.

=== Marriage and children ===
That year he married Josephine Cranny (1858–1944), and they had seven children: Philomena (Mimi, c. 1886), Joseph (1887), Moya (Maria, c. 1889), Geraldine (Gerry, c. 1891), George Oliver (1895), Fiona (c. 1896) and John (Jack, c. 1897). From 1907 to 1916, he was curator of the National Museum in Dublin.

== Political career ==
=== 1890s ===
Plunkett, a Home Rule supporter for many years, took the Parnellite side when that party split. On their behalf he contested the parliamentary constituencies of Mid Tyrone in 1892 and Dublin St Stephen's Green in 1895 and 1898 – missing election in the latter contest by just 138 votes.

=== 1910s ===
Plunkett's interest in politics likely came mostly through his sons Joseph, George and John, and though it was following the execution of Joseph that he became radicalised, it is likely that Joseph swore him into the Irish Republican Brotherhood (IRB) some time before the Rising. His daughter Fiona, in an RTÉ interview in 1966, described how in the months before the Rising he went to Switzerland on behalf of the IRB leaders to try to make contacts with the Germans. Joseph, George and Jack were all sentenced to death following the Easter Rising, but George and Jack had their sentences commuted to 10 years' penal servitude, and both were released in 1917. At least two of his daughters, Philomena and Fiona, were involved in preparations for the Rising. He was expelled from the Royal Dublin Society for his sons' role in the Rising.

Three weeks before the Rising Plunkett was dispatched to the Vatican to seek a private audience with Pope Benedict XV in the hope of getting the Pope's blessings. Plunkett reports that the Pope was moved by the religious symbolism of staging the Rising on Easter Sunday and persuaded him to give his "Apostolic Benediction" upon the rebels. When Plunkett once again travelled to the Vatican in 1920 Benedict XV congratulated Plunkett on his cabinet position.

The new politics was indebted to its youth wing's vocal support: they gathered in numbers at Carrick railway station to cheer on Plunkett's campaign. Amongst the crowds were the women of Cumann na mBan, "a big percentage of youth...large numbers of young men...[and] more curious still for those days, young women."

On 3 February 1917, running as an independent candidate, Plunkett won the seat of Roscommon North in a by-election. At his victory party in Boyle he announced his decision to abstain from Westminster. He called a Convention in the Mansion House in April 1917, where after some debate it was agreed to set up a 'Council of Nine' bringing all nationalists together under one banner. He continued to build up the Liberty League Clubs.

The different groups were merged in October 1917, under the newly elected Éamon de Valera, at the Sinn Féin Convention. The League of Women Delegates protested that there were only 12 women out of 1,000 delegates; and only Countess Plunkett on the Council of Nine. It was de Valera's genius to adopt a flexibility that incorporated Plunkett and other non-republicans. Their common aim was "an Irish government". They intended to be active citizens taking part in the nomination of elections.

He was re-elected in the 1918 general election and joined the First Dáil, in which he served briefly as Ceann Comhairle. At the first public session, during a sober address given by Father Michael O'Flanagan, Plunkett warned the small crowd not to cheer. The Catholicity of the meetings confirmed the divisions to unionist communities.

Nominally Plunkett was given the foreign affairs portfolio, owing to his seniority, but effectively Arthur Griffith conducted policy abroad. De Valera moved him to a Fine Arts portfolio in August 1921, in an effort to create an inner cabinet of only six; so a wholly new ministry was created for the purpose, "giving the appearance of stability and progressiveness to their affairs." De Valera's green modernism marginalized the old nobility, however Catholic and correct.

=== 1920s to 1930s ===
Following the Irish War of Independence, Plunkett joined the anti-treaty side, and continued to support Sinn Féin after the split with Fianna Fáil. He lost his Dáil seat at the June 1927 general election. In a 1936 by-election in the Galway constituency, Plunkett ran as a joint Cumann Poblachta na hÉireann/Sinn Féin candidate. Losing his deposit, he polled only 2,696 votes (2.1%). In 1938, he was one of the former members of the Second Dáil that purported to assign a self-proclaimed residual sovereign power to the IRA, when they signed the statement printed in the 17 December 1938 issue of the Wolfe Tone Weekly (see Irish republican legitimism).

While Dáil minister for foreign affairs, Plunkett wrote a lengthy letter to Éamon de Valera warning him not to develop too close a relationship with "the Jews" on the grounds that, among other things, the British press "was largely owned and controlled by Jews", in Italy, Jews were responsible for the publication of pornography, "for a bad Jew shows his racial hatred of Christians by corrupting them," and "the dirty and ignorant sufferers from Russia and the Balcaus [sic] make very troublesome immigrants." However, he also made some positive remarks on Jews: "Their best men show great distinction in music, are fine linguists, Cosmopolitan, sensitive, enthusiastic about art, genial, charitable, clean living (and) generally large-minded and good employers of Christians".

=== Death ===
He died on 12 March 1948, at the age of 96 in Dublin.

Parliament of the United Kingdom
Preceded by James O'Kelly	Member of Parliament for Roscommon North; 1917–1922	Constituency abolished
Oireachtas
New constituency	Teachta Dála for Roscommon North; 1918–1921	Constituency abolished
Political offices
Preceded by Cathal Brugha	Ceann Comhairle of Dáil Éireann; 22 January 1919	Succeeded by Seán T. O'Kelly
New office	Minister for Foreign Affairs; 1919–1921	Succeeded by Arthur Griffith

Dáil	Election	Deputy (Party)	Deputy (Party)	Deputy (Party)	Deputy (Party)
2nd	1921	Thomas Carter (SF)	James Dolan (SF)	Andrew Lavin (SF)	George Noble Plunkett (SF)
3rd	1922	Thomas Carter (PT-SF)	James Dolan (PT-SF)	Andrew Lavin (PT-SF)	George Noble Plunkett (AT-SF)
4th	1923	Constituency abolished. See Leitrim–Sligo and Roscommon			

Dáil	Election	Deputy (Party)	Deputy (Party)	Deputy (Party)	Deputy (Party)
4th	1923	George Noble Plunkett (Rep)	Henry Finlay (CnaG)	Gerald Boland (Rep)	Andrew Lavin (CnaG)
4th	1925 by-election	George Noble Plunkett (Rep)	Martin Conlon (CnaG)	Gerald Boland (Rep)	Andrew Lavin (CnaG)
5th	1927 (Jun)	Patrick O'Dowd (FF)	Martin Conlon (CnaG)	Gerald Boland (FF)	Michael Brennan (Ind.)
6th	1927 (Sep)	Patrick O'Dowd (FF)	Martin Conlon (CnaG)	Gerald Boland (FF)	Michael Brennan (Ind.)
7th	1932	Daniel O'Rourke (FF)	Martin Conlon (CnaG)	Gerald Boland (FF)	Frank MacDermot (NCP)
8th	1933	Patrick O'Dowd (FF)	Michael Brennan (CnaG)	Gerald Boland (FF)	Frank MacDermot (NCP)
9th	1937	Michael Brennan (FG)	Daniel O'Rourke (FF)	Gerald Boland (FF)	3 seats 1937–1948
10th	1938	Michael Brennan (FG)	Daniel O'Rourke (FF)	Gerald Boland (FF)	3 seats 1937–1948
11th	1943	John Meighan (CnaT)	John Beirne (CnaT)	Gerald Boland (FF)	3 seats 1937–1948
12th	1944	Daniel O'Rourke (FF)	John Beirne (CnaT)	Gerald Boland (FF)	3 seats 1937–1948
13th	1948	Daniel O'Rourke (FF)	John Beirne (CnaT)	Gerald Boland (FF)	Jack McQuillan (CnaP)
14th	1951	John Finan (CnaT)	John Beirne (CnaT)	Gerald Boland (FF)	Jack McQuillan (Ind.)
15th	1954	James Burke (FG)	John Beirne (CnaT)	Gerald Boland (FF)	Jack McQuillan (Ind.)
16th	1957	James Burke (FG)	John Beirne (CnaT)	Gerald Boland (FF)	Jack McQuillan (Ind.)
17th	1961	James Burke (FG)	Patrick J. Reynolds (FG)	Brian Lenihan Snr (FF)	Jack McQuillan (NPD)
17th	1964 by-election	Joan Burke (FG)	Patrick J. Reynolds (FG)	Brian Lenihan Snr (FF)	Jack McQuillan (NPD)
18th	1965	Joan Burke (FG)	Patrick J. Reynolds (FG)	Brian Lenihan Snr (FF)	Hugh Gibbons (FF)
19th	1969	Constituency abolished. See Roscommon–Leitrim			

Dáil	Election	Deputy (Party)	Deputy (Party)	Deputy (Party)
22nd	1981	Terry Leyden (FF)	Seán Doherty (FF)	John Connor (FG)
23rd	1982 (Feb)	Terry Leyden (FF)	Seán Doherty (FF)	Liam Naughten (FG)
24th	1982 (Nov)	Terry Leyden (FF)	Seán Doherty (FF)	Liam Naughten (FG)
25th	1987	Terry Leyden (FF)	Seán Doherty (FF)	Liam Naughten (FG)
26th	1989	Terry Leyden (FF)	Tom Foxe (Ind.)	John Connor (FG)
27th	1992	Constituency abolished. See Longford–Roscommon		
