= North Roscommon =

Former parliamentary constituency in the United Kingdom

- Former county constituency for the House of Commons

1885–1922
- Seats: 1
- Created from: County Roscommon
- Replaced by: Leitrim–Roscommon North

North Roscommon was a UK Parliament constituency in Ireland, returning one Member of Parliament from 1885 to 1922.

Prior to the 1885 general election the area was part of the County Roscommon constituency. From 1922 it was no longer represented in the UK Parliament.

== Boundaries ==
This constituency comprised the northern part of County Roscommon.

1885–1922: The baronies of Ballintober North, Boyle and Frenchpark, and that part of the barony of Roscommon not contained in the constituency of South Roscommon.

== Members of Parliament ==
Election	Member	Party
1885	James Joseph O'Kelly	Nationalist
1892	Matthias McDonnell Bodkin	Anti-Parnellite Nationalist
1895	James Joseph O'Kelly	Parnellite Nationalist (Nationalist from 1900)
1917	George Noble Plunkett	Sinn Féin
1922	Constituency abolished	

== Elections ==
=== Elections in the 1880s ===
1885 general election: North Roscommon
Party	Candidate	Votes	%	±%
Irish Parliamentary	James Joseph O'Kelly	4,664	72.1	
Irish Parliamentary	Patrick Mullany	1,438	22.2	
Irish Conservative	Caleb Robertson	366	5.7	
Majority		3,226	49.9	
Turnout		6,468	74.5	
Registered electors		8,682		
Irish Parliamentary win (new seat)				

1886 general election: North Roscommon
Party	Candidate	Votes	%	±%
Irish Parliamentary	James Joseph O'Kelly	Unopposed		
Registered electors		8,682		
Irish Parliamentary hold				

=== Elections in the 1890s ===
1892 general election: North Roscommon
Party	Candidate	Votes	%	±%
Irish National Federation	Matthias McDonnell Bodkin	3,251	50.4	N/A
Irish National League	James Joseph O'Kelly	3,199	49.6	N/A
Majority		52	0.8	N/A
Turnout		6,450	68.8	N/A
Registered electors		9,730		
Irish National Federation gain from Irish Parliamentary		Swing	N/A	

1895 general election: North Roscommon
Party	Candidate	Votes	%	±%
Irish National League	James Joseph O'Kelly	3,411	53.8	+4.2
Irish National Federation	Thomas Condon	2,935	46.2	−4.2
Majority		476	7.6	N/A
Turnout		6,346	65.2	−3.6
Registered electors		9,739		
Irish National League gain from Irish National Federation		Swing		

=== Elections in the 1900s ===
1900 general election: North Roscommon
Party	Candidate	Votes	%	±%
Irish Parliamentary	James Joseph O'Kelly	Unopposed		
Registered electors		8,995		
Irish Parliamentary hold				

1906 general election: North Roscommon
Party	Candidate	Votes	%	±%
Irish Parliamentary	James Joseph O'Kelly	Unopposed		
Registered electors		8,627		
Irish Parliamentary hold				

=== Elections in the 1910s ===
January 1910 general election: North Roscommon
Party	Candidate	Votes	%	±%
Irish Parliamentary	James Joseph O'Kelly	Unopposed		
Registered electors		8,528		
Irish Parliamentary hold				

December 1910 general election: North Roscommon
Party	Candidate	Votes	%	±%
Irish Parliamentary	James Joseph O'Kelly	Unopposed		
Registered electors		8,528		
Irish Parliamentary hold				

O'Kelly dies, prompting a by-election.

By-election, 1917: North Roscommon
Party	Candidate	Votes	%	±%
Ind. Nationalist	George Noble Plunkett	3,022	55.8	New
Irish Parliamentary	Thomas Devine	1,708	31.5	N/A
Independent	Jasper Tulley	687	12.7	New
Majority		1,314	24.3	N/A
Turnout		5,417	67.7	N/A
Registered electors		7,997		
Ind. Nationalist gain from Irish Parliamentary		Swing	N/A	

1918 general election: North Roscommon
Party	Candidate	Votes	%	±%
Sinn Féin	George Noble Plunkett	Unopposed		
Registered electors		21,258		
Sinn Féin gain from Irish Parliamentary				
