= 1917 North Roscommon by-election =

UK Parliamentary by-election

The 1917 North Roscommon by-election was held on 3 February 1917. The by-election was held due to the death of the incumbent Irish Parliamentary MP, James Joseph O'Kelly. The election took place nine months after the 1916 Rising. The election was contested by Thomas Devine, standing for the Irish Parliamentary Party, who was expected to win comfortably, and Jasper Tully, a local newspaper owner who was running as an independent.

An outsider candidate was proposed as an Independent candidate: Count George Noble Plunkett; the father of Joseph Plunkett, who had been executed for his role in the Easter Rising. Count Plunkett was proposed by John J. O'Kelly (Sceilg), P. T. Keohane and Fr. Michael O'Flanagan, the curate of Crossna in North Roscommon. Fr. O'Flanagan was main organiser of the election, assisted by Larry Ginnell, and many others who came from Dublin to take on the Irish Parliamentary Party.

Though often credited as Sinn Féin's first victory in a Parliamentary election, Plunkett was not a member of Sinn Féin.

== Result ==
North Roscommon by-election, 1917
Party	Candidate	Votes	%	±%
Ind. Nationalist	George Noble Plunkett	3,022	55.8	New
Irish Parliamentary	Thomas Devine	1,708	31.5	N/A
Independent	Jasper Tully	687	12.7	New
Majority		1,314	24.3	N/A
Turnout		5,417	67.7	N/A
Ind. Nationalist gain from Irish Parliamentary		Swing	N/A	
