= Michael O'Flanagan =

Roman Catholic priest and Irish scholar (1876–1942)

The Reverend Michael O'Flanagan
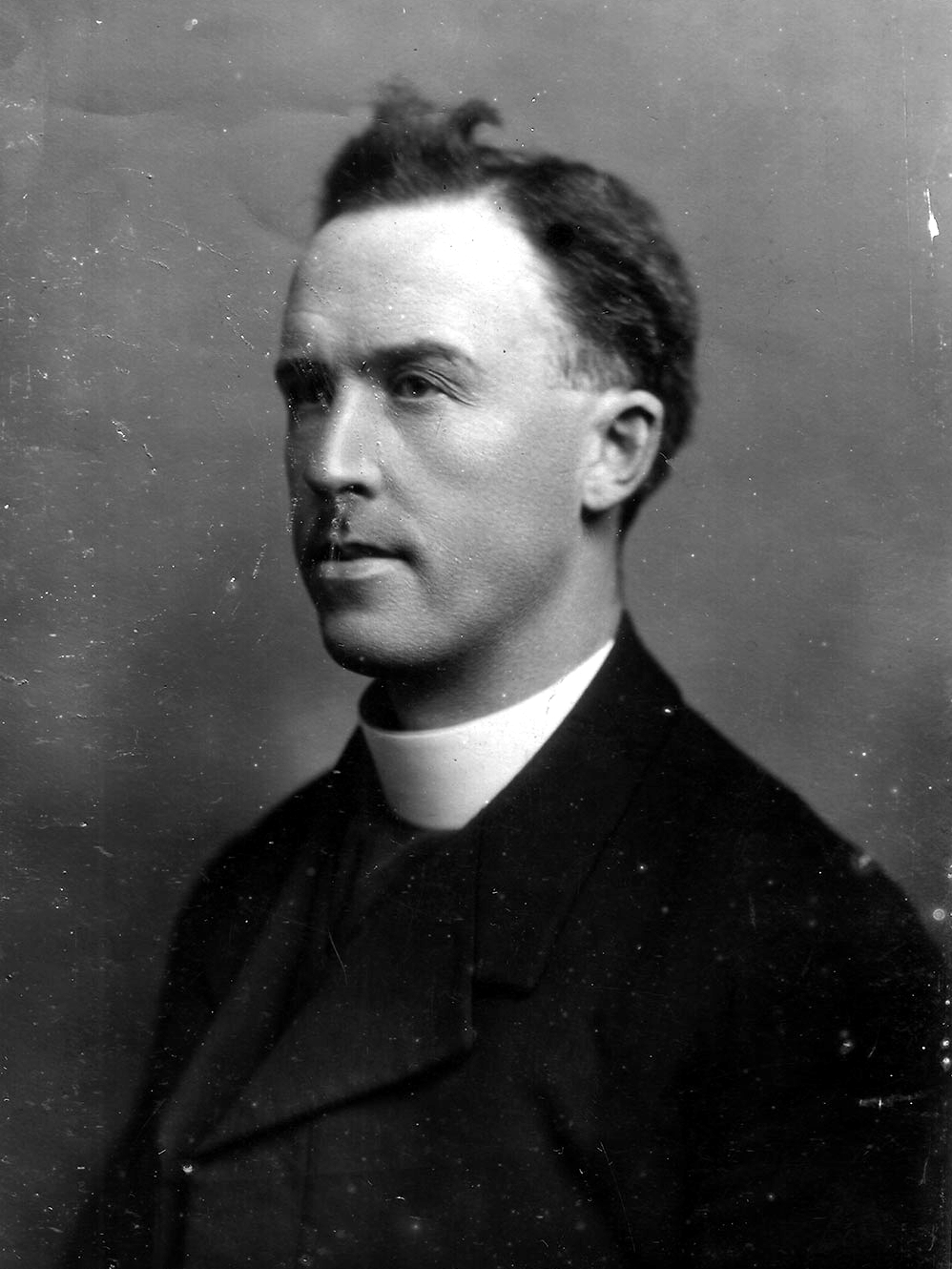
- O'Flanagan, c. 1912

President of Sinn Féin
- In office 1933–1935
- Preceded by: Brian O'Higgins
- Succeeded by: Cathal Ó Murchadha

Chaplain of the First Dáil
- In office 1919–1921

Vice President of the Gaelic League
- In office 1920–1921

Vice President of Sinn Féin
- In office 1917–1923
- In office 1930–1931

Personal details
- Born: 13 August 1876 Cloonflower, County Roscommon, Ireland
- Died: 7 August 1942 (aged 65) Dublin, Ireland
- Party: Sinn Féin
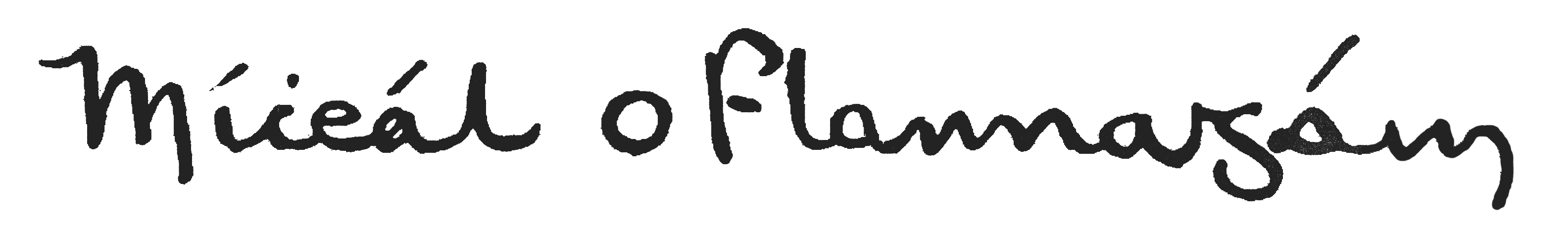
- Signature
- Website: frmichaeloflanagan.com
- Nickname: The Sinn Féin Priest

Michael O'Flanagan (Irish: Mícheál Ó Flannagáin; 13 August 1876 – 7 August 1942) was a Roman Catholic priest, Irish language scholar, inventor and historian. He was a popular, socialist Irish republican; "a vice-president of the Irish Agricultural Organisation Society, he was a proponent of land redistribution." He was Gaelic League envoy to the United States from 1910 to 1912, and he supported the striking dockers in Sligo in 1913.

O'Flanagan was friends with many of the leaders of the 1916 Easter Rising and was vocal in his admiration for the sacrifice made by the men of Easter Week. He was active in reorganising the Sinn Féin party after the Rising. He was the main driving force behind the Election of the Snows in North Roscommon in February 1917, when Count Plunkett won a by-election as an independent candidate.

At the Sinn Féin Convention in October 1917, Éamon de Valera was elected president. Along with Arthur Griffith, O'Flanagan was elected joint vice-president, a position he held from 1917 to 1923 and again from 1930 to 1931. He campaigned for the imprisoned Griffith in the East Cavan by-election in 1918, and was instrumental in securing the seat. For this O'Flanagan was suspended by the Bishop; he went on to work full-time for Sinn Féin and was the main platform speaker and campaigner during the 1918 election.

While O'Flanagan was Acting President of Sinn Féin in 1920, he corresponded publicly with David Lloyd George about peace moves, to the upset of his colleagues. He went on to hold meetings with Lloyd George and Edward Carson in January 1921, and reported British terms to Éamon de Valera on his return. He was President of Sinn Féin from 1933 to 1935.

O'Flanagan travelled extensively throughout his lifetime, spending many years in the United States, and several months in Rome. After five months as Republican envoy to Australia he was deported in 1923. O'Flanagan, James Larkin and Frank Ryan were considered the best open-air orators of the twentieth century.

He was suspended from the priesthood for many years because of his political beliefs and attitudes. In later years he edited the 1837 Ordnance Survey letters and prepared sets for institutions and universities; in the 1930s he worked on a series of County Histories, and ten volumes were published by the time of his death. He died in 1942, was given a state funeral, and is buried in the Republican Plot in Glasnevin Cemetery.

== Early life and education ==
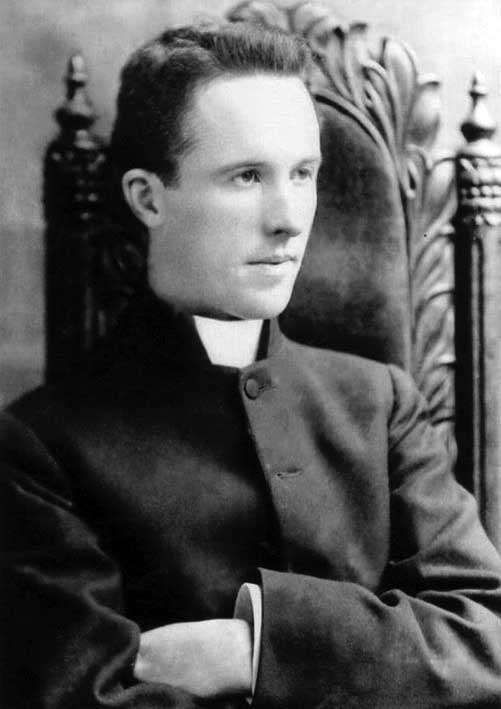
Young Michael O'Flanagan, photo possibly taken at his ordination in 1900.

Michael Flanagan was born on 13 August 1876 at Cloonfower in the parish of Kilkeeven, close to Castlerea in County Roscommon. He was the fourth of eight children born to Edward Flanagan (born 1842) and Mary Crawley (born 1847); the children in order of birth were Maire, Luke, Patrick, Michael, Brigid, Edmund, Kate and Joseph. Both parents were fluent speakers of Irish and English, living on a small farm in what was known as a breac or speckled gaeltacht. When he was three years old, the 1879 famine swept through the west of Ireland. While conditions were not as severe as thirty years earlier, there was great fear among the people who had survived the earlier starvation, expressed in a wave of religious fervour, as for example, the apparitions at Knock in 1879. The Flanagan family were staunch supporters of the Fenian movement. As a young man Michael lived through the evictions, boycotts and shootings of the Land War. His parents were members of the Land League, and he was fascinated by politics, avidly following the rise and fall of Charles Stewart Parnell. O'Flanagan attended the local national school at Cloonboniffe, known as the Don School, where his teacher was Michael O'Callaghan. In 1890 O'Flanagan went on to attend secondary school at Summerhill College in Sligo. He entered St Patrick's College, Maynooth in the autumn of 1894 where he had an excellent academic record, winning prizes in theology, scripture, canon law, Irish language, education, and natural science.

O'Flanagan was ordained a priest of the Third Order of St. Francis for the Diocese of Elphin in Sligo Cathedral on 15 August 1900 at the age of 24. It was around this time that he began to use the Irish form of his surname.

While working in Sligo O'Flanagan was active in his promotion of the Irish culture and language, and he gave evening language classes in Sligo Town Hall. He was a founding member and secretary of the Sligo Feis, which was first held in 1903, when Padraig Pearse was invited to give a lecture titled "The Saving of a Nation" in Sligo Town Hall. Both Pearse and Douglas Hyde were the judges of the Irish language competitions in 1903 and again in 1904.

== Fundraising in the United States ==
O'Flanagan was a keen supporter rural development and Irish self-reliance, with practical knowledge and point of view, having grown up on a small farm. He was a skilled public speaker and communicator and was vocal in agitating for radical social and political change. In 1904 he was invited by his Bishop John Joseph Clancy and Horace Plunkett to travel to the United States on a speaking and fundraising tour. Douglas Hyde wrote to him on 3 November to say that he had read O'Flanagan's work on Irish Phonetics with great interest and that he was sorry to see him go to America.

His mission was to promote Irish industry, in particular the lace industry, and to find investment and collect donations for agricultural and industrial projects in the west of Ireland. The diocese of Elphin had purchased the Dillon estate at Loughglynn in County Roscommon and had established a dairy industry there, managed by nuns of the Franciscan Missionaries of Mary. Part of O'Flanagan's mission was to pay off the outstanding debt on the venture.

O'Flanagan was a fundraiser who disliked simply asking for donations and preferred to use other more practical methods to raise funds. He returned to Ireland in 1905 and procured a trio of lace and craftworkers, Mary O'Flanagan Rose Egan and Kate Davoren, and set up a travelling industrial and cultural exhibition. The trio would give public demonstrations and show samples of various regional styles of Irish lace while O'Flanagan curated the exhibition and gave lectures and interviews. The group travelled across the United States from coast to coast and held exhibitions in fifty-one cities over ninety-six weeks.

In another example of his innovative approach to fundraising, O'Flanagan brought a sod clay from every county with him; these sods were arranged into a map of Ireland during the exhibitions, and the public were charged a dollar to step on the soil of their native county. O'Flanagan was an excellent publicist and placed notices in regional newspapers to advertise his industrial exhibition. He gave countless interviews to newspapers and many public lectures during his travels, and forged many connections within the Irish-American community.

Apart from trips home in 1905 and again in 1908, O'Flanagan remained in the United States until he was recalled to Ireland in 1910.

=== Sinn Féin ===
In June 1910 O'Flanagan returned to Ireland. He joined Sinn Féin, the party with which his name would become synonymous, and was elected to the standing committee. The party had evolved from the National Council, a loose umbrella group of nationalists originally founded by Arthur Griffith in 1905. When O'Flanagan, fresh from his travels and keen to participate, joined Sinn Féin the party was in its "Monarchist" phase. Griffith's working model for Irish independence was based on the Austro-Hungarian Compromise of 1867, where Ireland would regain her sovereignty and share power as an equal member of the Commonwealth.

Griffith believed Irish MP's should begin by boycotting English Parliament and setting up a native Parliament in Dublin. Sinn Féin's policies were beginning to appear irrelevant after 1910 when John Redmond's Irish Parliamentary Party won enough seats to put Home Rule and the Irish question firmly on the new Government's agenda. O'Flanagan's radical influence and energy would help transform and reorganise the party after the Election of the Snows in 1917.

== Gaelic League Envoy ==
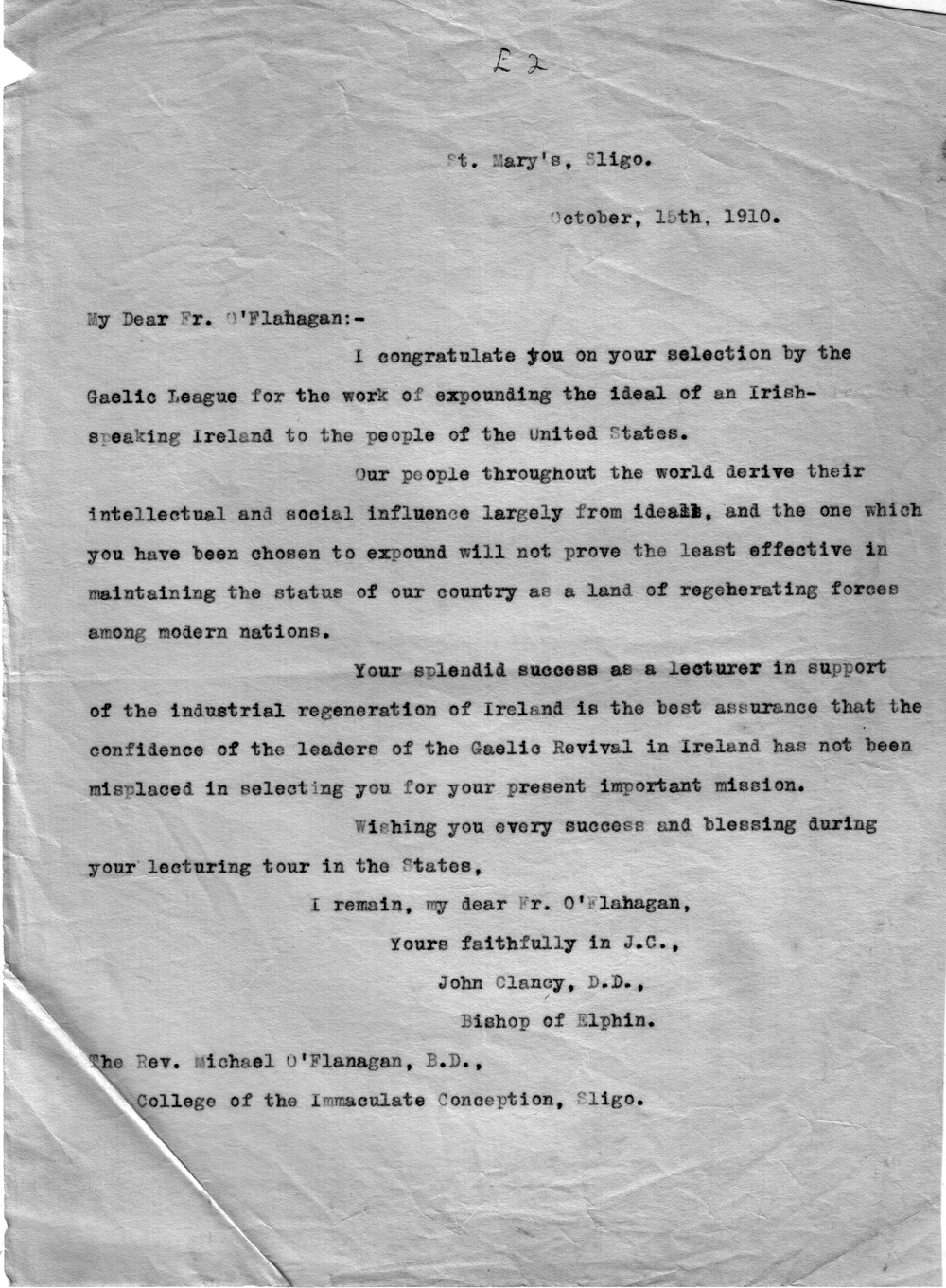
Letter from bishop Clancy to Michael O'Flanagan, 1910, congratulating him on his selection as an envoy for the Gaelic League in the United States.

In August 1910, after attending a meeting of the Gaelic League O'Flanagan was elected to the standing committee. He reported "the existence in every part of the States of an Irish population that is ever anxious to hear of home progress and to meet any representatives of any Irish movement." Within a few weeks of his appointment to the standing committee the Gaelic League asked him to return to United States with Fionan MacColum on a fundraising mission to repair the League's dwindling finances. O'Flanagan advised Douglas Hyde to seek permission from Bishop Clancy, who not only agreed, but published a letter congratulating O'Flanagan on his selection. O'Flanagan and MacColum arrived on 1 October 1910 and set up an office at 624 Madison Avenue in New York. Problems arose with American funders over the alleged association with the staging of John Millington Synge's controversial play "Playboy of the Western World". John Devoy threatened to withdraw his support from the Gaelic League, if this was the kind of Irish culture American money was supporting. O'Flanagan, after consultation with Hyde in Dublin, issued a statement in the New York Times on 4 December 1911 disassociating the work of the Gaelic League from anything to do with William Butler Yeats, Lady Gregory or the Abbey players.

=== Return to Ireland ===
O'Flanagan returned to Ireland where Bishop Clancy appointed him curate in Roscommon in 1912. On 19 October Bishop Clancy died, and his successor, Bernard Coyne was a conservative who seems to have resented O'Flanagan's perceived modernism and independence, and their relationship was to be a poor one.

In 1912 O'Flanagan was invited to Rome to give a series of lectures for Advent, and was a guest preacher in San Silvestro for four weeks. While in Rome he spent time with his good friend John Hagan who was director of the Irish College, and there is a large collection of letters between the two in the Hagan archive there. O'Flanagan is often referred to as "Brosna'" in the letters.

In March 1913 a protracted strike broke out at the Sligo Docks. In May O'Flanagan visited the strikers to show his solidarity and advised them to continue insisting for their rights. It has been suggested that this display of socialism prompted the Bishop to move O'Flanagan to Cliffoney. When the advanced nationalist Keating Branch took control of the Gaelic League, O'Flanagan was elected to the Standing Committee for two years. A recently discovered photograph shows O'Flanagan in a large group, many of whom were advanced nationalists at a meeting of the Gaelic League outside Galway Town Hall in August 1913.

O'Flanagan was active in attempting to reorganise and popularise the Sinn Féin party. On 22 February 1914 while staying in Crossna, he wrote a letter to Count Plunkett, then head of the National Museum in Dublin, hoping to encourage the Count to join Sinn Féin:

I enclose my rough outline of plan of organisation. It will need a good deal of criticism in regard to detail. My object was to get money in as quickly as possible so that we might get on with the work to hand. You would need somebody who has made a study of organisation methods to consider it carefully before adoption. I think myself that the Sinn Féin organisation will now spread through the country if vigorously pressed from headquarters. Get the Sinn Féin Executive to send out copies of the rules to the principal men amongst the local committees of North Roscommon. If Sinn Féin spreads rapidly the Irish Alliance will not be needed. However, there is no time to lose.

In 1914 O'Flanagan was invited back to Rome to give a series of Lenten lectures, and he spent six weeks, again preaching in San Silvestro's. At the end of his course of lectures he received a medal from the pope, Benedict XV. While preparing to leave Rome, O'Flanagan was informed he was to be removed from Roscommon and was to proceed to Cliffoney in County Sligo.

== Cliffoney ==
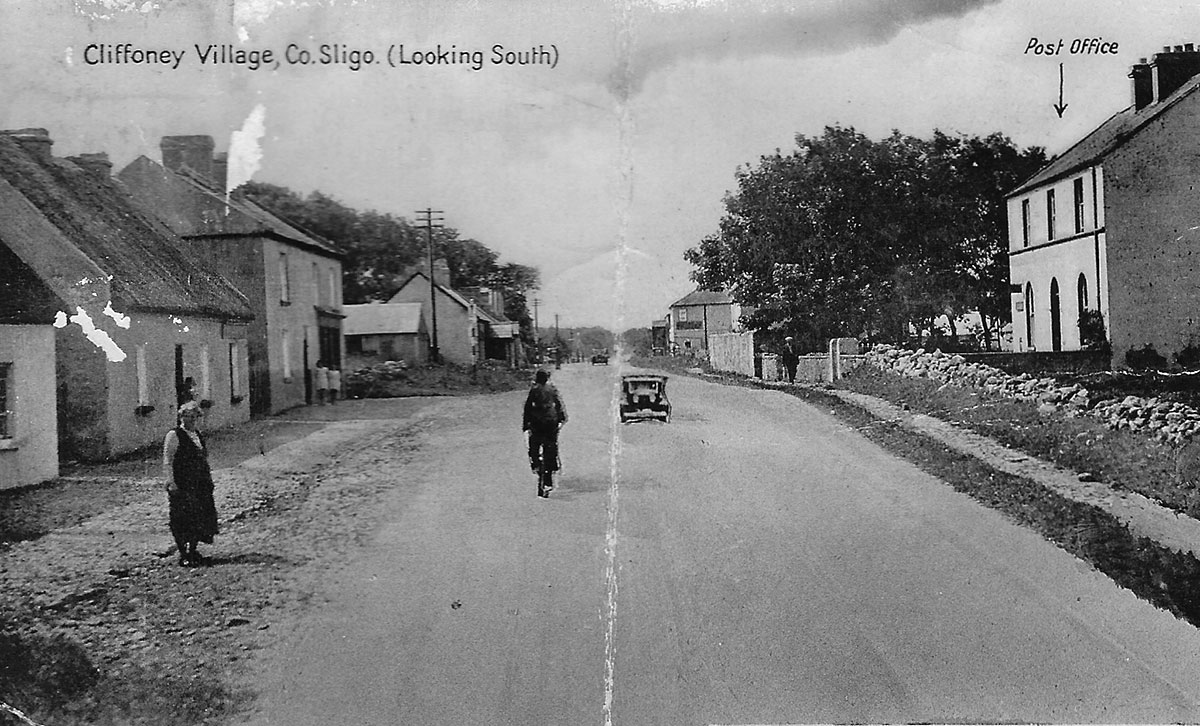
An old postcard of Cliffoney Village.

In late July 1914 the Bishop Bernard Coyne transferred O'Flanagan to Cliffoney, a small village in the parish of Ahamlish in north County Sligo. He had instructions from the bishop to assist the ailing priest, help the faltering lace industry in Cliffoney, and to look for land or a building for a village hall. Initially he rented a Lodge in Mullaghmore before eventually moving up to Cliffoney where he rented a cottage from Mrs. Hannan.

While living in Cliffoney he actively campaigned against recruitment in the British army. His sermons were noted down by the RIC from the barracks next to the church who often occupied the front pew with notebooks to hand. Along with his old pupil from Summerhill, Alec McCabe, O'Flanagan was instrumental in re-organising the company of the Irish Volunteers in the Cliffoney area after the split with Redmond's National Volunteers. "At that time we had a Catholic Curate, the late Father Michael O'Flanagan, a great Irishman and strong supporter of the Republican Movement. He gave us every assistance and encouragement and advised the young men of the parish to join the Irish Volunteers. In all, forty men joined the Cliffoney Company." O'Flanagan was actively opposed to the conscription of young Irishmen into the British army. O'Flanagan condemned the export of food from the area, and demanded a fair and proper distribution of turbary rights. In newspaper pieces he contrasted Irish opinion-makers' outrage against Germany's contemporary treatment of Belgium with their indifference to England's ongoing treatment of Ireland.

=== The Cloonerco Bog Fight ===
While living in Cliffoney, O'Flanagan discovered that the villagers were being denied access to the local bogs by the Congested Districts Board, the public body in charge of land redistribution. After a protracted and fruitless correspondence with the CDB he eventually took action, coincidentally on the day O'Donovan Rossa died in New York.

On 30 June 1915 O'Flanagan led some 200 of his parishioners up to Cloonerco bog where they commenced cutting turf, an incident which became known as "The Cloonerco Bog Fight". When the RIC constables, who had followed the marchers to the bog, intervened and threatened to arrest anyone who cut turf, O'Flanagan stepped forward and began cutting. A large quantity of turf was harvested and distributed, despite police interference and an injunction being served on six of the turf-cutters. The surplus turf was stacked outside the Fr. O'Flanagan Hall and opposite the R.I.C barracks. The stack was draped with a tricolour, and a banner inscribed by O'Flanagan, saying Ár Moin Féin, "Our Own Turf" was attached, and attracted much attention from passers-by. The affair simmered on over the summer of 1915; eventually the locals in Cliffoney were granted access to the bogs.

=== The Father O'Flanagan Hall ===
The villagers of Cliffoney had no church hall or communal gathering place, and meetings were generally held on the main street at the crossroads, outside the R.I.C barracks at Speaker's Corner. Shortly after O'Flanagan's arrival in Cliffoney, a new national school was opened. He wrote to the owner of the old school, Colonel Ashley of Classiebawn castle and asked him to give the building to the villagers. Ashley complied and handed over the building, which was erected in 1824 by Lord Palmerston. In gratitude the villagers named their new hall the Father O'Flanagan Hall and it soon became the home of the Cliffoney Sinn Féin club. During the Cloonerco Bog protest a large stack of turf, draped with a tricolour, was built outside the hall. The Father O'Flanagan Hall was used for drilling by the Cliffoney Volunteers, who also held dances, concerts and plays. It was burned by the Auxiliaries at the end of October 1920 in reprisal for the Moneygold ambush a few days earlier.

=== O'Donovan Rossa funeral ===
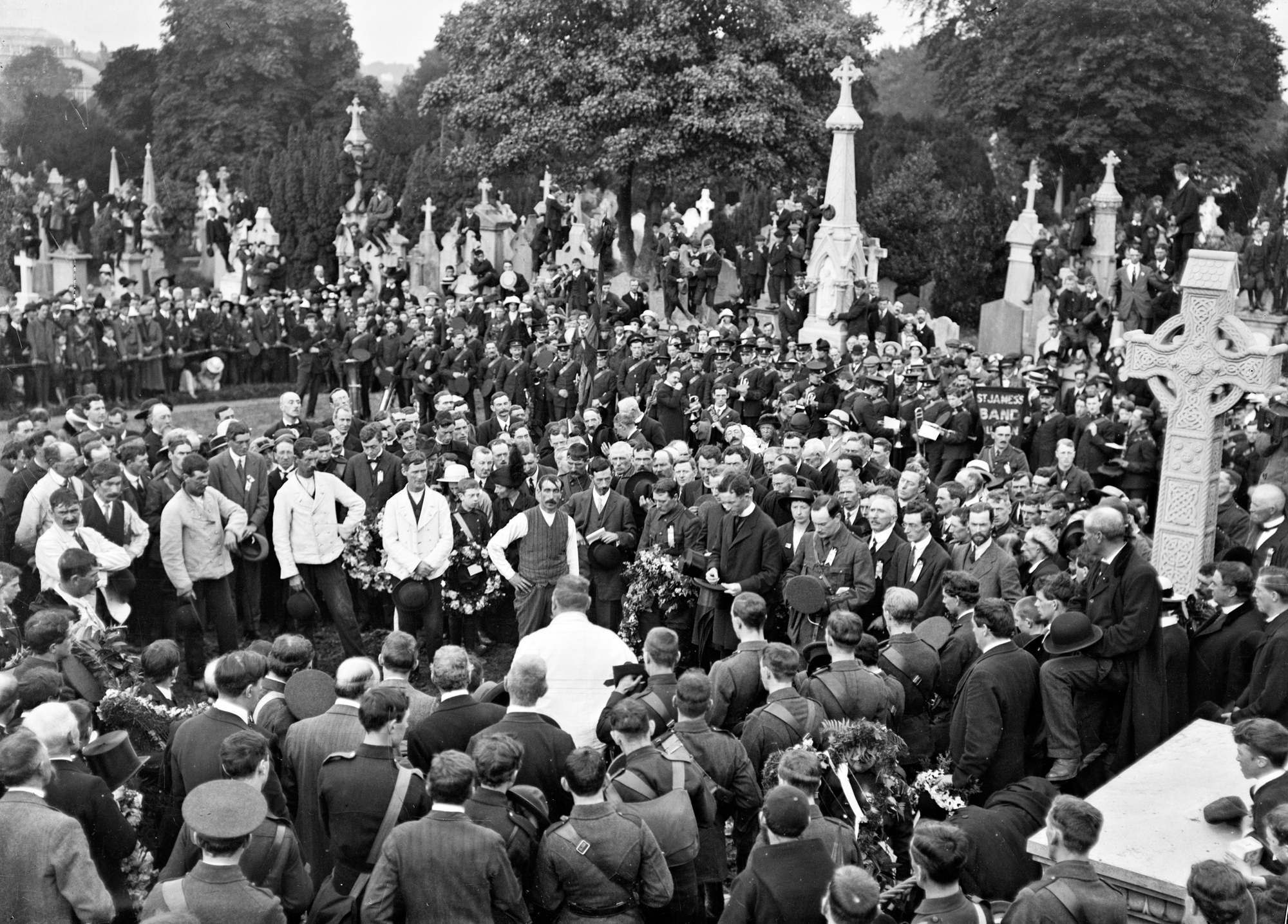
O'Flanagan and Padraig Pearse at the O'Donovan Rossa funeral, 1 August 1915.

At the end of July O'Flanagan was invited, at the request of Mary Jane O'Donovan Rossa, to speak at the funeral of her husband the veteran Fenian Jeremiah O'Donovan Rossa. O'Flanagan had visited the O'Donovan Rossa family during his travels in America. O'Flanagan posed for a photograph with Mary Jane and Eileen O'Donovan Rossa, and Tom Clarke, the notoriously camera-shy organiser of the funeral and subsequent Easter Rising. O'Flanagan then delivered a passionate oration to a select group of Irish Volunteers and nationalists at the reception of O'Donovan Rossa's remains to the lying-in-state in Dublin City Hall. Countess Markievicz was so profoundly moved by his speech that she began to consider converting to Catholicism. The following day O'Flanagan accompanied the O'Donovan Rossa family to Glasnevin Cemetery where he recited the final prayers in Irish by the graveside standing beside Patrick Pearse who then made his iconic speech.

=== Sligo Tillage meeting ===
On 9 October 1915 O'Flanagan attended a "tillage meeting" in Sligo court house. "Chaired by Canon Doorley, later bishop of Elphin, the meeting was packed with official personages such as the crown solicitor for Sligo T. H. Williams and the RIC district inspector, O'Sullivan." A campaign was under way to encourage increased tillage cultivation to support the war effort. The main speaker was T. W. Russell, the Minister of Agriculture, who proposed a motion to that effect. O'Flanagan proposed a counter-motion to the effect that Russell's motion should be rejected without radical land reform, and went on to denounce the war and conscription. He said that Irish people should stay out of the war not of their making, and to raise plenty of crops to be kept at home to feed the many native people in want. His motion was ignored. His speech was reported in the local papers and the following morning the RIC visited Bishop Coyne at his residence in St. Mary's.

=== The Cliffoney Rebellion ===
Within days of the Sligo meeting O'Flanagan was transferred to Crossna, County Roscommon. The people of Cliffoney responded to his removal by locking the church, an incident which became known as the "Cliffoney Rebellion". On the morning of 17 October, the key of the sacristy was taken; the door of the church was nailed shut from the inside and the new priest, C. McHugh was denied entry.

The villagers began kneeling outside the church door each evening to say the Rosary for the return of O'Flanagan. They marched en masse into Sligo to interview the Bishop, who made himself absent. They also as sent a petition to the Pope, but nothing came of this. The Bishop refused to back down, or to meet the villagers and the rebellion continued through the autumn of 1915. Eventually the church was opened after ten weeks, when O'Flanagan intervened in the dispute and appealed to the villagers to open the church for Christmas as a present to him. The door was unlocked on Christmas Eve 1915.

== Crossna ==
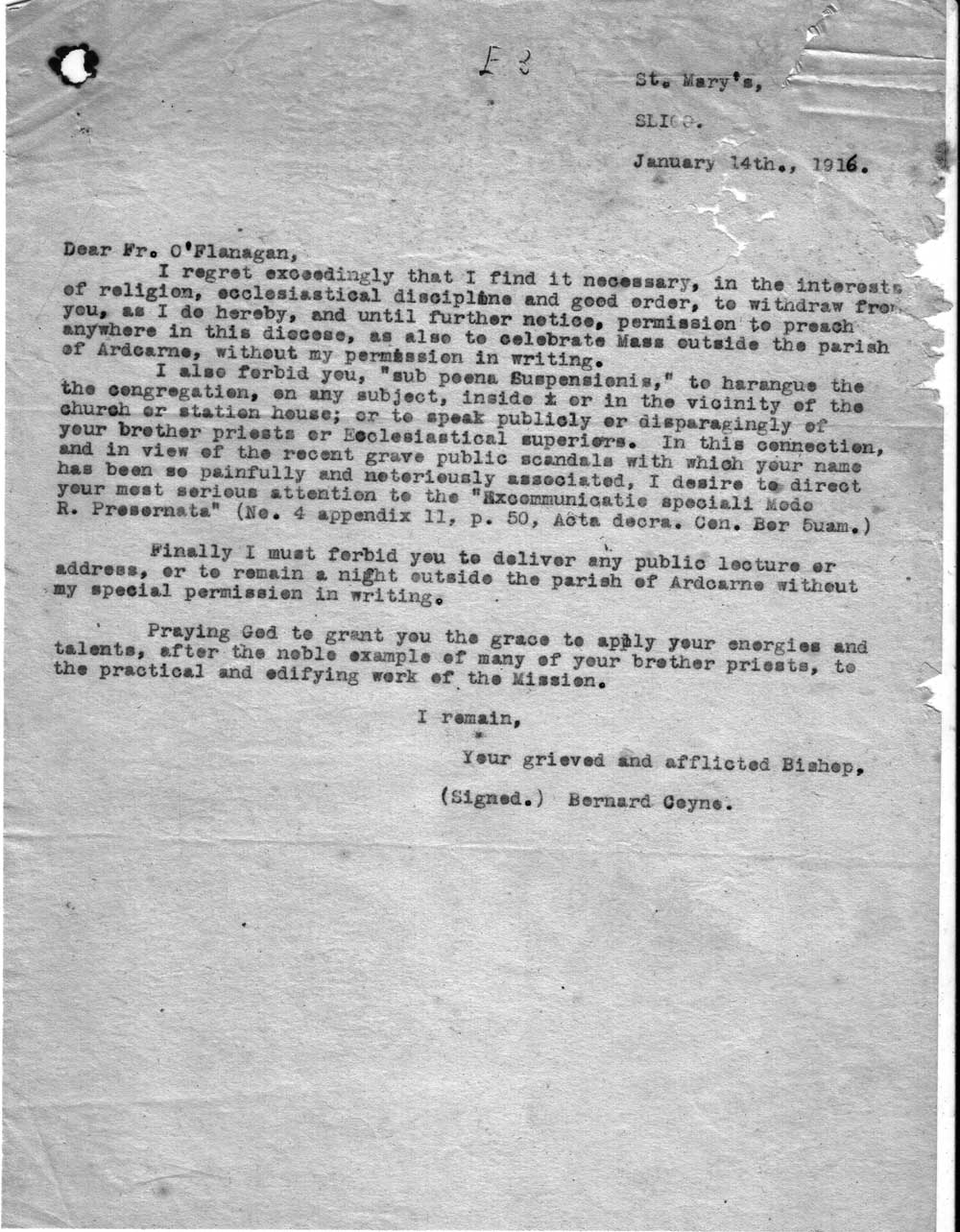
A letter from Bishop Coyne dated 14 January 1916, forbidding Michael O'Flanagan to speak at public meetings on pain of suspension.

On 25 November 1915, O'Flanagan delivered a lecture entitled "God Save Ireland" to a packed audience in St. Mary's Hall, Belfast at a commemoration for the Manchester Martyrs.

In January 1916 he took the train to Cork where he spoke to a monster crowd at an anti-conscription meeting chaired by Thomás MacCurtáin – later assassinated by Crown forces – and policed by Terence MacSwiney who would die in 1920 after a 74-day hunger strike.

O'Flanagan's fiery speech was recorded by the RIC and widely reported in the national press. Upon his return to Crossna he was sanctioned by Bishop Coyne, who sent O"Flanagan a letter on 14 January 1916 stating:

I regret exceedingly that I find it necessary – in the interests of religion, ecclesiastical discipline and good order – to withdraw from you as I do hereby and until further notice, permission to preach anywhere in this diocese: – as also to celebrate mass outside the parish of Ardcarne without my permission in writing...... (Note: Letter from bishop Bernard Coyne to Michael O'Flanagan forbidding him from spending a night outside the parish or from speaking at political events. St. Mary's, Sligo. 14 January 1916. Dear Father O'Flanagan, I regret exceedingly that I find it necessary – in the interests of religion, ecclesiastical discipline and good order – to withdraw from you as I do hereby and until further notice, permission to preach anywhere in this diocese: – as also to celebrate mass outside the parish of Ardcarne without my permission in writing. I also forbid you "sub poena suspensiouis" – to harangue the congregation, on any subject, inside or in the vicinity of the church or station house; or to speak publicly and disparagingly of your brother priests or ecclesiastical superiors. In this connection and in view of the recent grave public scandals with which your name has been so painfully and notoriously associated, I desire to direct your most serious attention to the Eccommunicto speciali modo R. P. reservata (No. 4. Appendix II. P. 50 aeta et deciu Con. Prov. Tuam.) Finally I must forbid you to deliver any public lecture or address, or to remain a night outside the parish of Ardcarne without my special permission in writing. Praying to God to grant you the grace to apply your energies and talents – after the noble example of so many of your brother priests – to the practical and edifying work of the mission. I remain your grieved and afflicted Bishop, Signed Bernard Coyne.)

The letter concluded, "I remain your grieved and afflicted Bishop, signed Bernard Coyne."

He was invited to speak at a gathering of the Volunteers in Dundalk, but declined, sending a copy of the Bishop's letter to illustrate his problem. O'Flanagan, sometimes ignored the Bishop's orders, and presided over meetings at Ringsend and Donnybrook in Dublin on Thursday 6 April 1916, shortly before the Rising. The meetings were in protest against the deportation of Ernest Blythe and Liam Mellows. Among the speakers were The O'Rahilly and Thomas McDonagh; some 100 recruits were signed up for the Irish Volunteers.

O'Flanagan spent the summer of 1916 in North Roscommon, and did his best to obey the Bishop's instructions. While living in Crossna he became friends with Patrick Moran. When a company of Volunteers was formed in the area, Moran, a member of the Volunteers procured sixteen rifles which were transferred from Dublin to Carrick-on-Shannon by O'Flanagan.

He wrote and published many articles in the papers and journals, and outraged nationalists with a letter to the Freeman's Journal in June 1916 where he considered the implications of David Lloyd George's proposal to implement the 1914 Home Rule Act outside the six counties. Though he was ridiculed by fellow nationalists, who threw this letter back at O'Flanagan many times over the following years, another vice-president of Sinn Féin, Martin McGuinness eventually came to the same conclusion in 1998.

=== Easter Week ===
O'Flanagan was in great demand as a speaker at events and meetings: "Invitations poured in upon me from all over Ireland. I was getting tired of trying to explain how the Bishop had forbidden me, and why I continued to act in obedience to his prohibition." He was taken by surprise by the events of Easter Week, when many of his friends from the Irish Volunteers and the Gaelic League launched an armed insurrection in Dublin.

He had been invited to Athenry in County Galway to review a parade of Volunteers on Sunday 23 April 1916. However he did not feel he could make the journey there and back without drawing the Bishop's censure and so he stayed in Crossna, where he remained for the week.

O'Flanagan was friends with many of the leaders of the Easter Rising, and had met with many of them at the O'Donovan Rossa funeral, where he was photographed with both Tom Clarke and Padraig Pearse. "Fr. O'Flanagan realised that unless something was done immediately to exploit the inspiration of the men of Easter Week, and the abhorrence of the executions, the drift into political normality, as shown in West Cork, would be unstoppable."

In a letter to Alice Stopford Green dated 30 July 1916, containing signatures collected for the petition to reprieve Sir Roger Casement, O'Flanagan expressed his admiration for "the men of Easter Week," commenting:

Some of us do not like the quasi apology for the execution of the Irish Volunteer Leaders, insinuated in the fourth paragraph but we are willing to waive that point for the purpose of doing our part for Roger Casement. The men who were executed in Dublin are to us martyrs & heroes, & the Government that ordered their execution are guilty of a great crime.

=== One nation or two? ===
Two months after the rising in Dublin, in June 1916, O'Flanagan published a letter to Lloyd George. In Belfast, the Irish News was later to claim that as an "eloquent exposition of Ireland’s ‘dual nationhood'", it made the Prime Minister's "partitionist case" for the 1920 Government of Ireland Act. Since described by former Taoiseach, John Bruton, as "the only Irish nationalist who took Ulster unionist concerns seriously", O'Flanagan had argued that while "geography has worked hard to make one nation out of Ireland; history has worked against it", and that force could not, or should not, be used to overcome the division that endured:

The island of Ireland and the national unit of Ireland simply do not coincide. In the last analysis the test of nationality is the wish of the people… The Unionists of Ulster have never transferred their love and allegiance to Ireland. They may be Irelanders, using Ireland as a geographical term, but they are not Irish in the national sense… We claim the right to decide what is to be our nation. We refuse them the same right. After three hundred years England has begun to despair of making us love her by force. And so we are anxious to start where England left off. And we are going to compel Antrim and Down to love us by force.

O'Flanagan remained committed to the Sinn Féin programme of an Ireland independent and united, but was suggesting that it could only be achieved by openly acknowledging the complications that Protestant Ulster presented. (Citing O'Flanagan, in advance of India's partition the Indian nationalist Babasaheb Ambedkar was to make the same argument in respect of sub-continent's Muslim minority).

=== Election of the Snows ===
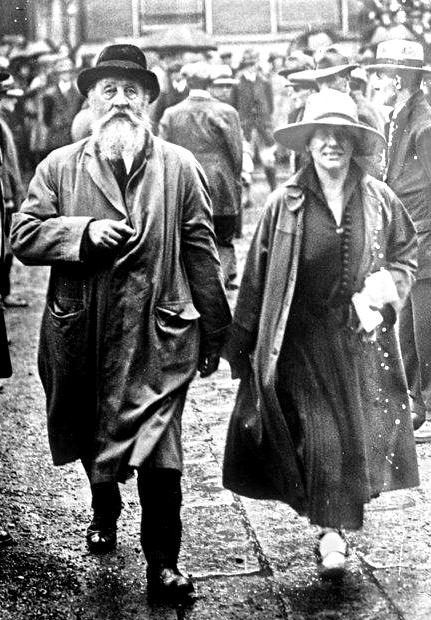
Count and Countess Plunkett

In December 1916, the Irish Parliamentary Party member for North Roscommon, the old fenian James O'Kelly died and his seat became vacant. A by-election was scheduled for February 1917 and O'Flanagan, forbidden to leave North Roscommon took full advantage of the situation.

Along with John J. O'Kelly and P. T. Keohane, O'Flanagan proposed Count George Noble Plunkett, father of the executed 1916 leader as a candidate, as "the passport to the situation at the time," and they wrote to the Count, then under house arrest in Oxford, inviting him to stand for the North Roscommon seat.

Noting these preparations Bishop Coyne issued a warning by letter to O'Flanagan on 21 January 1917, beginning "In view of the present political unrest in part of the country, and to prevent any misunderstanding in the future, I would like to call your attention to the following statute on the national Synod of Maynooth (p. 121, no. 379)." Citing four statutes in Latin the Bishop's letter concludes: "Non-compliance with the terms of these statutes will mean, in your case, an "ipso facto" suspension, and deprivation of the ordinary faculties of the diocese. I am, B. Coyne." (Note: Letter from Bishop Bernard Coyne to Michael O'Flanagan citing four paragraphs in latin from statute 397 of the National Synod of Maynooth. The letter is dated 21 January 1917 and is a warning to O'Flanagan to keep away from public events and meetings in the forthcoming North Roscommon by-election.)

O'Flanagan, meanwhile, was busy organising and coordinating the campaign as events unfolded. He wrote to his friend John Silke of Castlerea, asking him to "kindly get as much money as you can and send it to me for deposit with sheriff on behalf of Count Plunkett. It must be deposited with sheriff in Boyle before 2 o'clock on Friday 25th inst." On 27 January O'Flanagan wrote twice, sending a letter-card to both Oxford and Dublin, with arrangements for Count Plunkett to speak in Boyle and Ballaghdereen: "I have written to you in Oxford asking you to come to Boyle by the train that leaves Broadstone at 9 a.m. on Thursday & to speak there and at the fair in Ballaghadereen next, lest you might have left Oxford I am also writing this to Dublin." Indicating the importance of the Catholic church in elections, he adds that they are planning to hold meetings at some 25 churches the following day.

The campaign became known as the Election of the Snows on account of the adverse weather conditions which saw snow drifts of up to ten feet high blocking the roads. O'Flanagan, though forbidden to speak outside the boundaries of the parish, was at the forefront in running the campaign for the Count, which included the organisation of clearing the snow off the roads so that supporters could get out to vote. Count Plunkett only arrived two days before election day. O'Flanagan was joined by Seamus O'Doherty, a native of Derry, who became director of elections for the Count and Laurence Ginnell, the rebellious independent MP for Westmeath, who became Plunkett's election agent. They were joined by workers from Dublin and other parts, such as Michael Collins, Arthur Griffith, Larry Nugent, Rory O'Connor, Darrell Figgis, William O'Brien, Kevin O'Shiel, Joseph McGrath and Count Plunkett's daughter Geraldine with her husband Thomas Dillon.

After the election the Irish Times commented "For twelve days and nights he was up and down the constituency like a whirlwind and talking to people at every village and street corner and crossroads where he could get people to listen to him."

The winner was Count Plunkett, who took the seat by a large majority, the tally being Plunkett: 3,022; Devine: 1,708; Tully: 687. Count Plunkett and O'Flanagan were "chaired" from the courthouse to a celebration where Plunkett surprised his audience by announcing he would abstain from Westminster.

=== Count Plunkett's Convention ===
On 19 April 1917 Count Plunkett chaired a Convention of advanced nationalists at the Mansion House in Dublin in an attempt to seek common ground in the aftermath of the North Roscommon election victory. There were tensions between Count Plunkett and Arthur Griffith, as to the form and direction the movement should take and who should be in charge. Count Plunkett wanted to establish branches of his Liberty Clubs throughout the country, while others present felt they should more usefully continue to use the name and organisation of Sinn Féin. A split seemed imminent.

Robert Fullerton proposed that O'Flanagan to mediate between the two groups and prevent a split. O'Flanagan reached an agreement with Griffith, and they proceeded with the meeting, though later that evening O'Flanagan had to break up a row between Michael Collins and Arthur Griffith at a post convention gathering at Count Plunkett's residence.

A compromise "rainbow" committee was formed represented by members from all sides: Plunkett, O'Flanagan, Cathal Brugha and Thomas Dillon representing the republican wing, Arthur Griffith and Seán Milroy for Sinn Féin, Thomas Kelly and William O'Brien representing the Labour movement and Stephen O'Mara for the Irish Nation League. O'Flanagan proposed Countess Plunkett to represent the women of Ireland. This group became known as the Mansion House Committee.

The authorities of both Church and State were concerned by O'Flanagan's activities and the RIC kept notes of his movements and speeches.

=== Sinn Féin revival 1917 ===
The Mansion House Committee met five times. Their brief was to plan the forthcoming by-elections and organise a deputation to plead Ireland's case at the Paris Peace Conference at the end of the war. They also issued a statement rejecting any contact with Lloyd George's proposed Irish Convention chaired by Sir Horace Plunkett. As the 1916 prisoners were released over the summer of 1917, a number were co-opted onto an expanded committee.

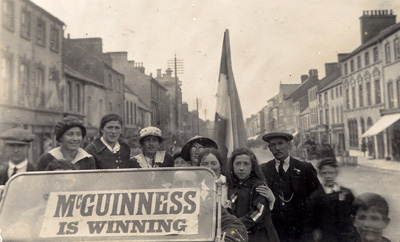
South Longford by-election, May 1917.

Another by-election was held in South Longford in May 1917 and republican prisoner Joseph McGuinness was put forward. Neither McGuinness nor Éamon de Valera, who was leader of the prisoners were keen on contesting, being wary of constitutional politics. The election was under the slogan "Put him in to get him out".

O'Flanagan was forbidden by the Bishop's restrictions to participate in the election campaign, which he found profoundly frustrating. "I did not think the time had come to break the muzzle and had to stay away from Longford," he remarked later in December 1918. McGuinness won by the narrow margin of thirty-seven votes after a recount. Successes in North Roscommon and South Longford persuaded de Valera to go forward in East Clare and he too was successful. Another by-election in Kilkenny was then won by another volunteer, William T. Cosgrave, who had been preferred to Arthur Griffiths as a candidate.

Thomas Ashe, arrested for making a seditious speech, died while being force-fed in Mountjoy Prison on 25 September. Requiem Mass was celebrated at the Pro-Cathedral by O'Flanagan on Friday morning before removal to City Hall where his body lay in state for two days. Ashe's remains were followed by a procession of 30,000 who marched to Glasnevin cemetery where Michael Collins gave the graveside oration.

=== Vice-President of Sinn Féin ===
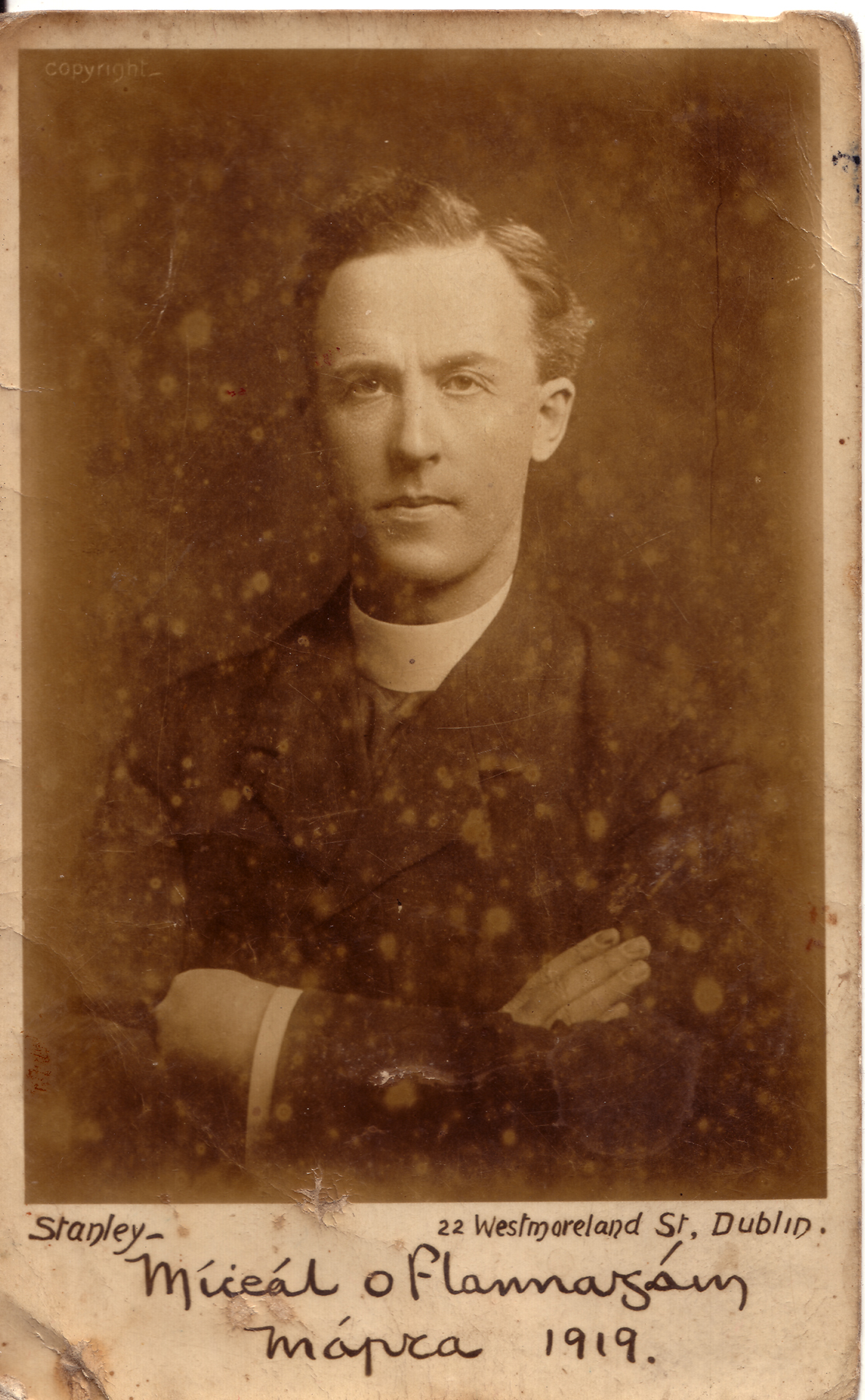
O'Flanagan in 1919

A convention was held at the end of October 1917, where the Easter Rising veterans and other supporting groups merged with Arthur Griffith's older organisation and adopted the name of Sinn Féin. Despite expectations of a split, Arthur Griffith and Count Plunkett stepped aside allowing de Valera to become president, with Griffith and O'Flanagan elected vice-presidents for a three-year term. "Long-term friends of Griffith in Sinn Féin, such as Alderman Tom Kelly, Robert Brennan and Jennie Wyse Power, remained the party's directors of elections, but this responsibility was taken on more by newcomers such as O'Flanagan who, in the absence of a chief whip (this was not a parliamentary party), was effectively the party's chief organiser." O'Flanagan proved a highly effective organiser and party manager.

On the same day the Irish Convention published their report the British Government decided to impose conscription on Ireland. The resulting backlash brought all the diverse nationalist strands together, including the Catholic church leaders and the Irish Party, united in a massive anti-conscription protest campaign. When the Military Service Act was passed in the House of Commons on 16 April 1918, John Dillon led the IPP members out in protest and they returned to Ireland to join the campaign. O'Flanagan had a long record of protesting against conscription dating back to his time in Cliffoney at the start of the war. He spoke at the conclusion of the monster rally in Ballaghadereen on 5 May, where John Dillon and Eamon de Valera shared a platform for the first and only time. In response to this wave of protest, Lord French's German Plot was set in motion, when old letters belonging to Sir Roger Casement were resurrected and used as flimsy propaganda. On 16 and 17 May sixty-nine Sinn Féin leaders were arrested and imprisoned by Crown forces, or went on the run if they had been tipped off by Michael Collins. O'Flanagan was exempted because he was a priest, and was left as the acting-president of the party.

=== East Cavan By-election ===
A political cartoon showing Arthur Griffith (left) and John Dillon (right).

In early 1918 Sinn Féin contested and failed to win three by-elections in South Armagh, Waterford and Tyrone. Another important by-election occurred on 20 June 1918 in East Cavan. With most of the leading Sinn Féin members in prison as a result of the German Plot, seasoned campaigners were in short supply. O'Flanagan was approached by Andy Lavin and asked to canvas for Arthur Griffith, then incarcerated in Gloucester prison.

He broke the Bishop's "muzzle" and delivered a vitriolic speech to 10,000 people at Ballyjamesduff on Sunday 26 May. The oration, which was suppressed by the censor, was printed and distributed widely as by Sinn Féin as "Father O'Flanagan's Suppressed Speech." O'Flanagan put terrific energy into the contest, and featured widely in both RIC and newspaper reports, always helpful for propaganda: "it was reported from Ballyjamesduff that a victim of paralysis has been visited by O'Flanagan and that, a few days after receiving the priest's blessing, the man was able to walk a short distance. With such advantages Sinn Féin could not lose." O'Flanagan had the satisfaction of seeing his fellow vice-president win by a comfortable majority. As a result of his appearance in Ballyjamesduff, O'Flanagan was suspended from his clerical duties by Bishop Coyne. "Father O'Flanagan has in fact, been more harshly treated by his own Bishop than the other Sinn Féin leaders have been treated by the British Government." When the people of Crossna discovered his suspension, they promptly followed the example set the Cliffoney villagers and locked Crossna church in protest. The Crossna Rebellion received widespread newspaper coverage. The villagers wrote a strongly-worded remonstrance in censure of the Bishop's actions, which was published in local newspapers. However, as with the Cliffoney Rebellion, the Bishop refused to negotiate or reinstate O'Flanagan. The church was opened after three weeks at O'Flanagan's request.

=== Freedom of Sligo ===
In late on Sunday 23 June O'Flanagan was awarded the Freedom of Sligo in recognition of his contribution to the nationalist cause. He made a public speech before a massive crowd on the steps of Sligo Town Hall. The RIC recorded his speech and estimated that there were at least 2,000 people in attendance.

As a result of his suspension O'Flanagan threw his time into his Sinn Féin work, residing in Dublin. He had no income at this time and a group of supporters in Crossna raised a subscription called the Father O'Flanagan Fund which was widely advertised in the national and regional newspapers.

== 1918 general election ==
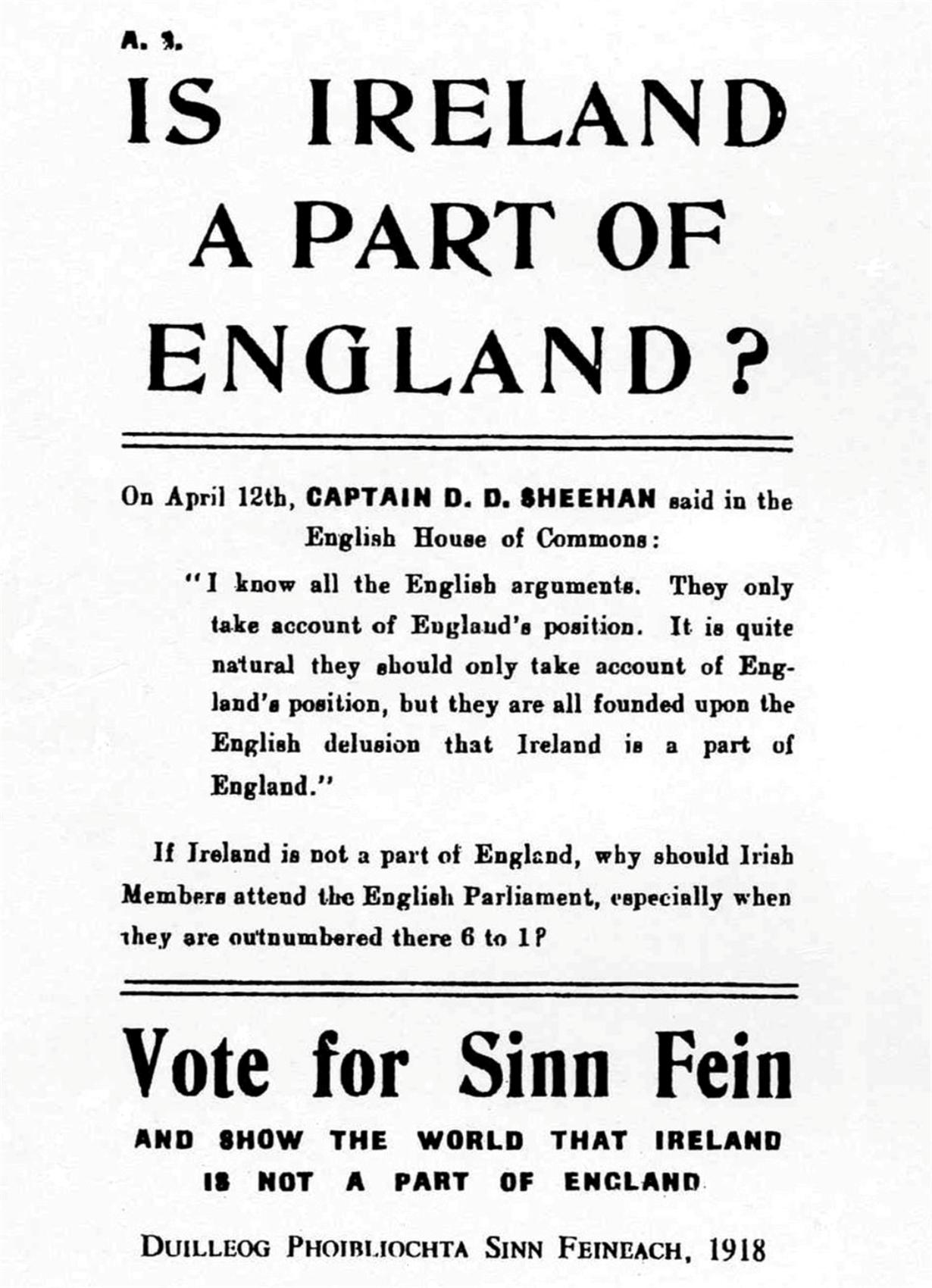
An election poster from 1918.

The Sinn Féin Ard Feis took place in the Mansion House on 29 October. With most of the leadership in prison, O'Flanagan chaired the meeting and gave the main address. As expected, when the war ended the first general election since 1910 was called.

On 11 November, coinciding with Armistice Day, Sinn Féin convened again to launch their general election campaign.

O'Flanagan toured the length and breadth of the country as one of the main and most popular public speakers for Sinn Féin. There are numerous accounts of his speeches and journeys scattered throughout the Bureau of Military History witness statements. He was usually accompanied by members of the Irish Volunteers for bodyguards. The campaign coincided with an outbreak of influenza, and many people died throughout Ireland. The 1918 election was fought under a franchise tripled in size, allowing women and many younger men to vote for the first time. O'Flanagan spoke at Ballaghadereen where he spoke of the sacrifice of the men of 1916 and castigated the leadership of the Irish Party for encouraging conscription. When the polling took place in December, Sinn Féin swept the boards, completing the process begun in North Roscommon, decimating the Irish Parliamentary party by taking 73 of the 105 seats available.

At the end of the 1918 election O'Flanagan remarked that "the people have voted Sinn Féin. What we have to do now is explain to them what Sinn Féin is."

=== Chaplain to the First Dáil ===
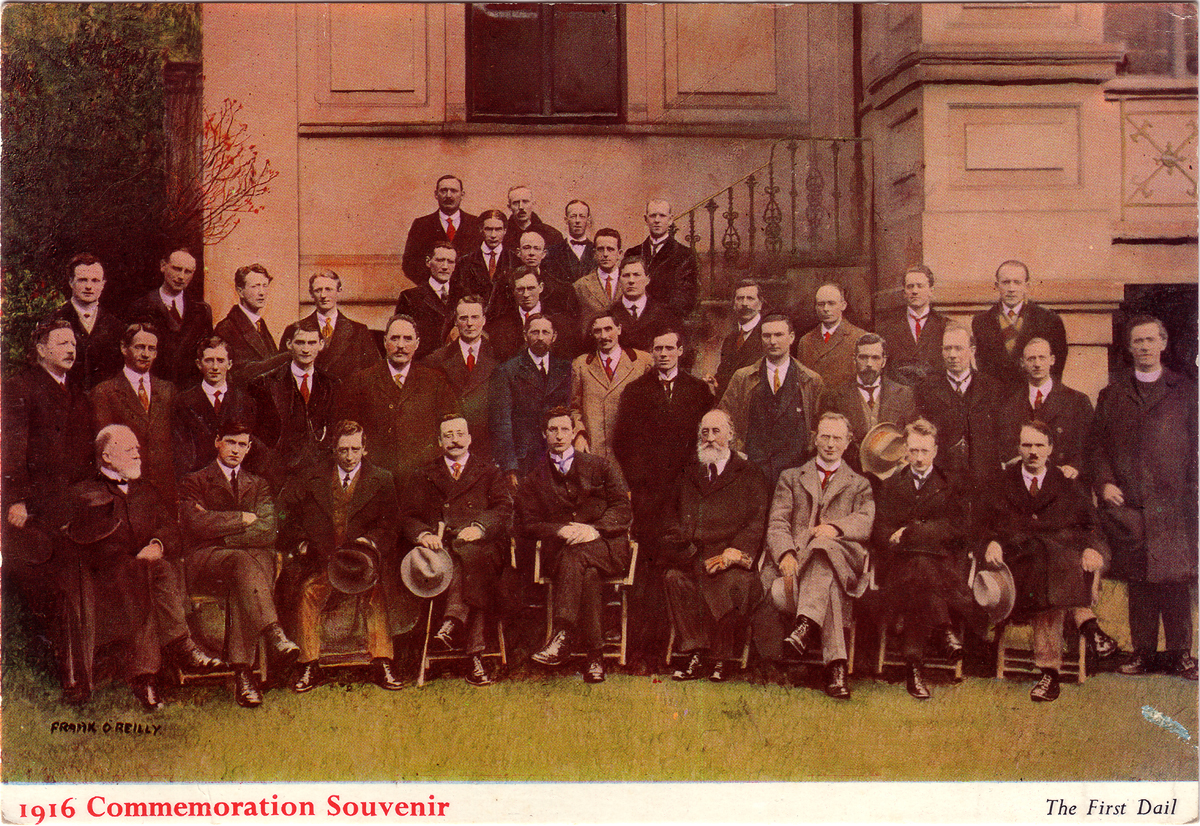
A postcard of the First Dáil, April 1919, with the chaplain Michael O'Flanagan standing to the right.

The successful Sinn Féin candidates abstained from Westminster and instead proclaimed an Irish Republic with Dáil Éireann as its parliament.

The First Dáil's inauguration took place in the Mansion House in Dublin on 21 January 1919. "The majority of the 103 members returned in the 1918 election were not present – some by choice, others through force of circumstance, their absences recorded in the recurring phrase of that day 'faoi ghlas ag Gallaibh.'" Harry Boland and Michael Collins were absent, having travelled to England to engineer de Valera's escape from Lincoln prison.

O'Flanagan was appointed chaplain to the First Dáil. He was introduced by the chairman Cathal Brugha as "the Staunchest Priest who ever lived in Ireland," and invited to open the proceedings with a prayer. He duly read a prayer in both Irish and English calling for guidance from the holy spirit. The opening of the First Dáil coincided with the outbreak of the War of Independence when two policemen were shot dead in Tipperary that afternoon.

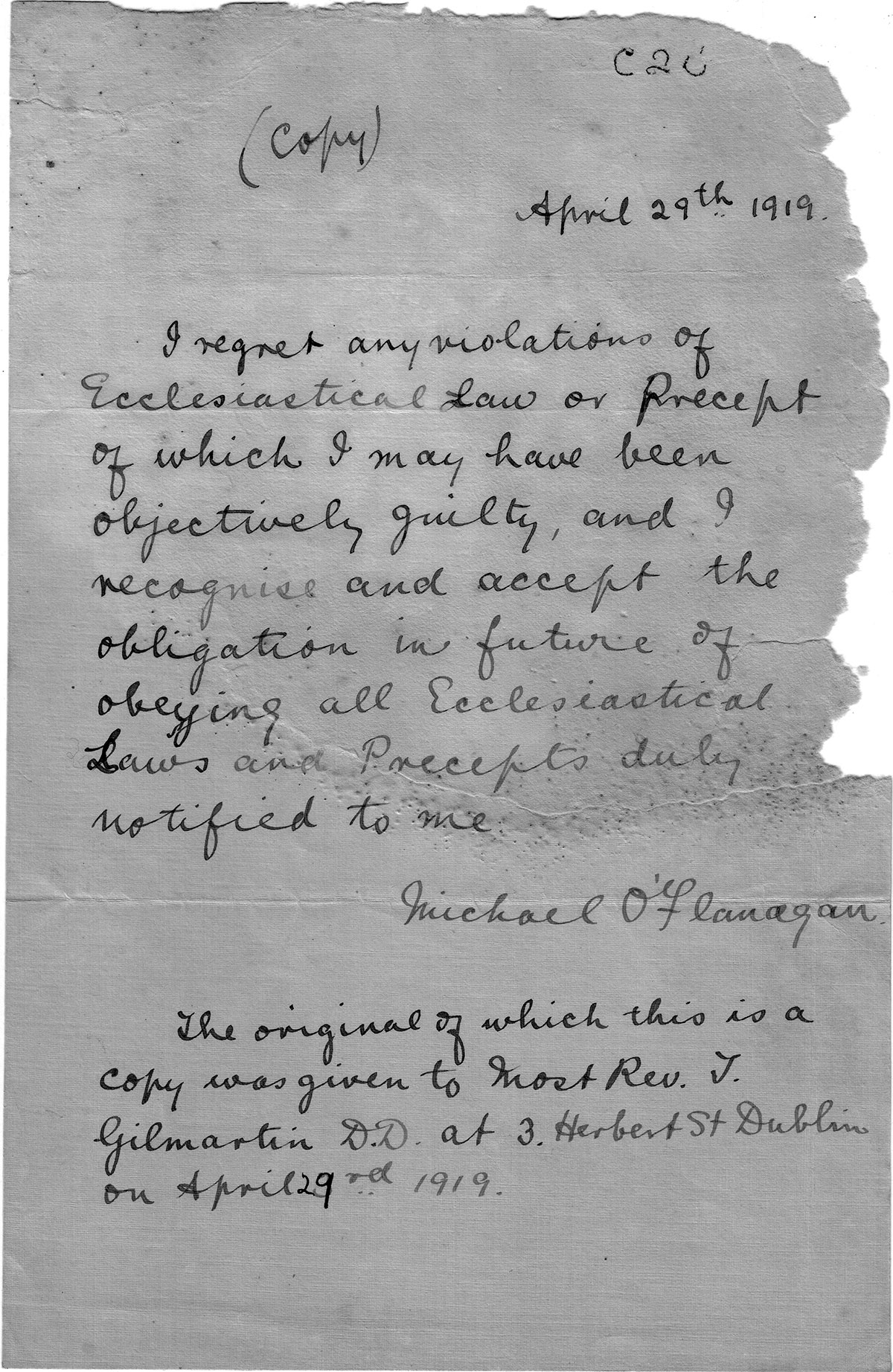
Draft copy of a letter from O'Flanagan to Bishop Coyne, 29 April 1919.

O'Flanagan attended a meeting of the Dáil in early April, attended by a larger number of TDs including escapee de Valera, Collins and Boland. The event was photographed for publicity and was printed as a poster and postcard.

In early May the Irish American delegation visited Dublin on their return from a fruitless mission to the Paris Peace Conference. The delegates, Michael F. Ryan, Edward Dunne and Frank P. Walsh posed for a photograph with senior members of Sinn Féin. O'Flanagan is standing with Count Plunkett and Arthur Griffith, accompanied by Éamon de Valera, Lawrence O'Neill the Lord Mayor of Dublin, and possibly W. T. Cosgrave, on the steps of the Mansion House.

On 19 May 1919, after a protracted period of negotiations involving the intercession of Archbishop Gilmartin of Tuam, O'Flanagan was restored to his full status as a priest. He was sent to Roscommon Town to resume his clerical duties. As a member of the Dáil's Land Executive he was responsible for propaganda and agriculture in County Roscommon. A Frank Leah illustration in the National Library of Ireland shows him attending a meeting the Dáil, chaired by Count Plunkett, on 21 June 1919.

=== Raid on O'Flanagan's rooms ===
Violence and reprisals continued to escalate throughout the country in late 1920. On 11 October O'Flanagan was arrested by Crown forces on his way to a meeting of the Ballinasloe Asylum Committee, but was released within a few hours.

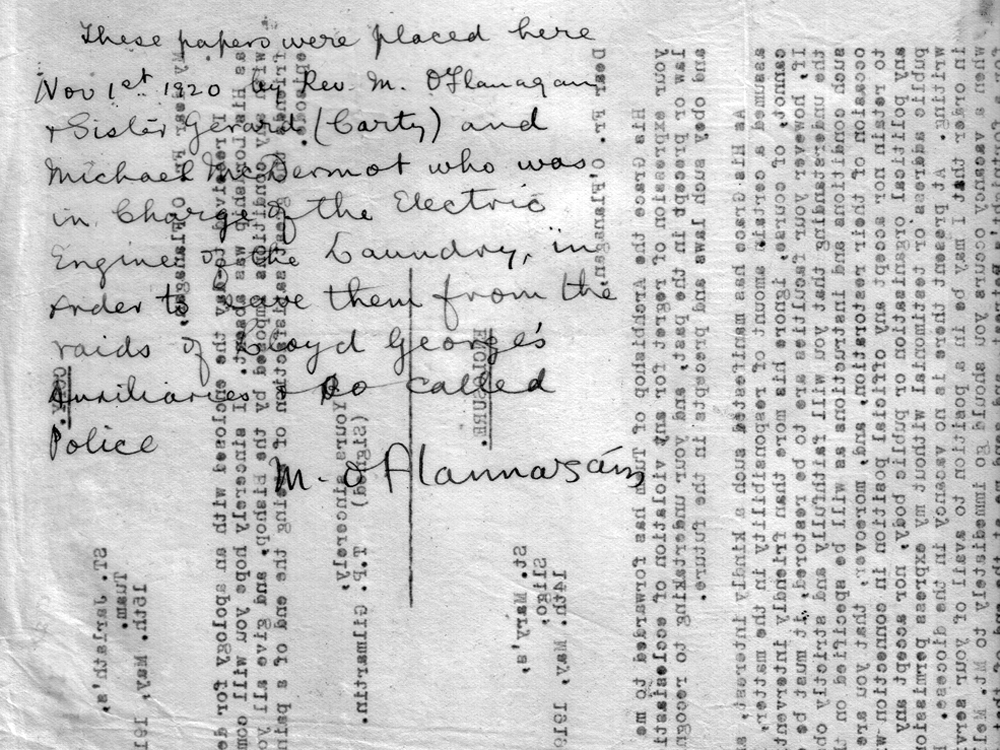
A note dated 1 November by O'Flanagan on the back of a letter from bishop Coyne, explaining why he was hiding his papers at Loughglynn.

On Friday 22 October, O'Flanagan's rooms in Roscommon were raided by two members of the Auxiliaries, accompanied by two RIC officers. They took books, papers, confiscated his typewriter, chopped up a suitcase of vestments, and stole a £5 note. The incident is recounted in the witness statement of John Duffy, one of the R. I. C. constables present. O'Flanagan's secretary and typist Vera McDonnell also left a record of the raid.

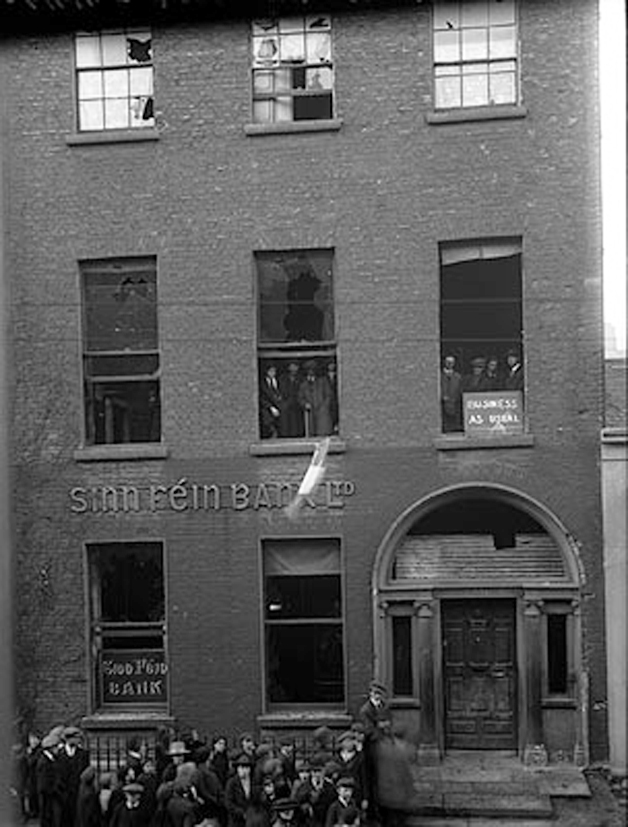
Sinn Féin Bank, 6 Harcourt Street, Dublin after a raid by Crown forces, 1 December 1920.

Three nights later on 25 October the Moneygold ambush took place three miles south of Cliffoney. The local Volunteers, many of whom were friends of O'Flanagan, attacked a nine-man RIC patrol from Cliffoney barracks and shot four dead including the sergeant, close to Ahamlish graveyard.

Cliffoney and the surrounding area was raided on several subsequent nights at the end October as a company of Auxiliaries based at Coolavin came to north Sligo for reprisals. Several houses in Cliffoney were burned along with Grange Temperance Hall and Ballintrillick Creamery. Also burned in reprisal was the Sinn Féin hall at Cliffoney, named after Father Michael O'Flanagan. Painted on the ruined walls of the latter was a message for local republicans: 'Vacated home of murder gang.'" On 1 November, the day of Kevin Barry's execution and Terence MacSwiney's funeral, O'Flanagan took his personal papers and hid them in the laundry room at the convent in Loughglynn. Bloody Sunday took place on 21 November when thirteen members of the Crown forces, sixteen civilians and three republican prisoners, including Dick McKee and Conor Clune, were killed.

=== Telegrams to Lloyd George ===
O'Flanagan was Acting-President of Sinn Féin while de Valera was in the United States and Arthur Griffith was in prison. On 6 December, responding to comments about peace made in the press by Prime Minister Lloyd George, O'Flanagan began a public dialogue through the medium of telegrams and newspapers. The first message ran "you state that you are willing to make peace at once without waiting for Christmas. Ireland is also waiting. What first step do you propose?"

These unexpected and unsanctioned moves caught his colleagues in Sinn Féin by surprise and they were quick to distance themselves from his comments. His critics, including Michael Collins, who was conducting his own secret peace moves through Archbishop Clune, was not impressed. "Collins made certain that the press was informed that O'Flanagan had acted unilaterally, writing in disgust, 'We must not allow ourselves to be rushed by these foolish productions or foolish people, who are tumbling over themselves to talk about a truce, when there is no truce.'" Collins and Griffith had been holding meetings with Archbishop Clune, who had been sent over by Lloyd George to negotiate terms of a truce. Lloyd George took O'Flanagan's messages as a sign of disunity among the leaders of Sinn Féin, and promptly changed the terms of his deal with Clune to include a surrender of weapons.

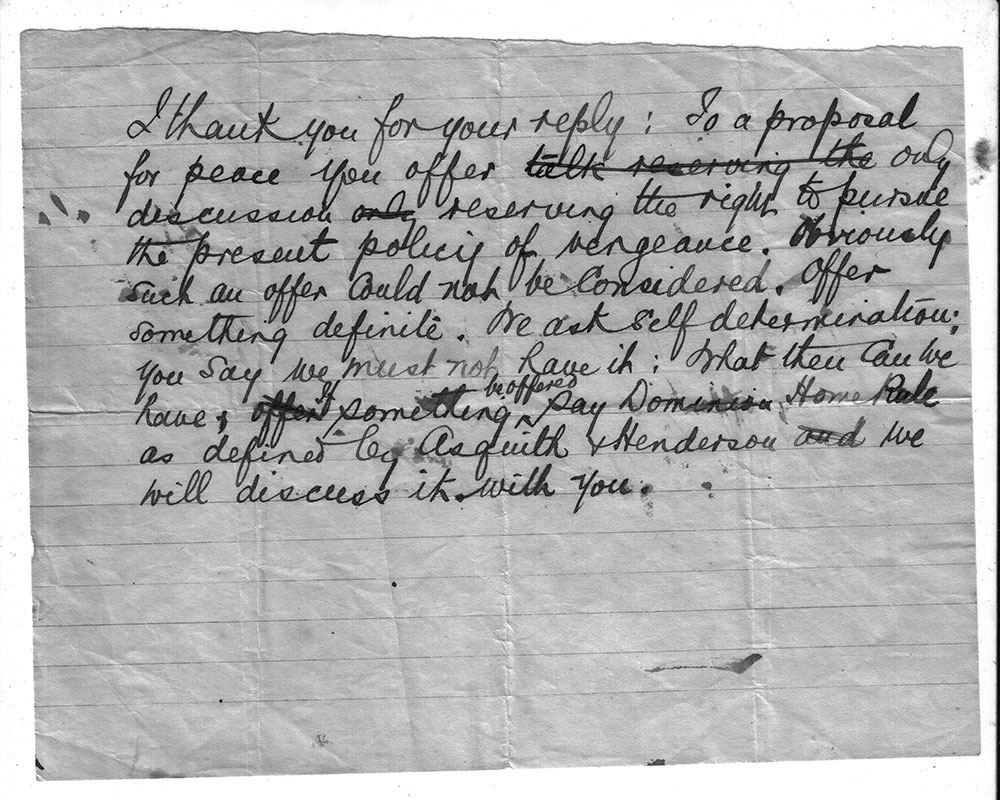
Hand-written draft of a telegram from O'Flanagan to Lloyd George, December 1920.

"A later comment by O'Flanagan suggests that his cable was a deliberate attempt to sabotage Clune's efforts, which he held to be too much influenced by Dublin Castle." He continued his dialogue with the British Prime Minister until de Valera's return from America on 23 December. De Valera arrived back in Ireland on 23 December, the day the Government of Ireland Act was passed, dividing the country in two. It was "because de Valera anticipated that the British government would soon attempt to resolve the Irish situation through placing an emphasis on church diplomatic channels that he considered that the Dáil had to be fully prepared for this eventuality by having as strong a rapport with the church as possible. For this reason, although de Valera dissuaded O'Flanagan from continuing the peace negotiations, he only censured rather than expelled him from Sinn Féin for having bypassed the authority of the Dáil."

De Valera used O'Flanagan to hold informal talks with Lloyd George in early January, where they discovered that Dominion status for Southern Ireland was the most that the British were prepared to offer. In late January 1921, O'Flanagan and judge James O'Connor met informally in London with Sir Edward Carson to discuss a peaceful solution to the conflict, but without success. O'Flanagan's movements and meetings were recorded and reported by detectives from the RIC. His importance as a peacemaker at this point was recognised by Lloyd George, who suggested confidential meetings by:

(1) a meeting between de Valera, O'Flanagan, O'Connor, Carson and Craig, to be followed by a meeting between the above five and the Prime Minister and Bonar Law; or, at de Valera's option, (2) a meeting between de Valera, O'Flanagan, O'Connor, the Prime Minister and Bonar Law in the first instance.

However these options were not taken up by De Valera.

Lloyd George and his cabinet then intensified the conflict and the last six months of the War of Independence were the most violent. On Monday 14 March 1921 O'Flanagan's friend, Patrick Moran from Crossna, was executed in Mountjoy Jail for several murders. "The next challenge which faced the Sinn Féin party came in May 1921, and it consisted of general elections for two separate 'devolved' parliaments in Dublin and Belfast."

== Republican Envoy ==
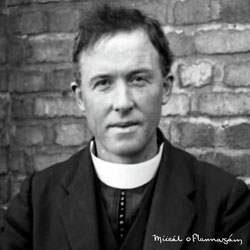
A photograph of O'Flanagan taken in New York in 1921.

At the Sinn Féin Ard-Feis at the end of October 1921, O'Flanagan was selected to travel to America as a Republican Envoy. After some difficulties about his passport and status, he landed in the United States in November. He was filmed and interviewed by British Pathé on his arrival in New York.

O'Flanagan was touring the east coast giving lectures and getting plenty of newspaper coverage in his mission "to help in raising the second external bond certificate loan of Dáil Éireann," when the Anglo-Irish Treaty was signed on 6 December 1921. By January 1922 Sinn Féin had divided on the issue of the Treaty. O'Flanagan and his friend and fellow envoy John J. O'Kelly (Sceilg) were strongly opposed to the Treaty, and refused to accept the validity or authority of the Free State.

In 1922 an article by O'Flanagan titled "Co-operation" was published as a sixteen-page booklet by Cumann Leigheacht an Phobail in Dublin. The article discusses the economic and human value of Co-operative Societies for Ireland.

=== Australia ===
When O'Flanagan and O'Kelly arrived in Australia they met the Archbishop of Melbourne, Daniel Mannix. The Archbishop had been one of O'Flanagan's teachers in Maynooth and he was politically sympathetic to their mission. Before long they were arrested for making seditious speeches, and incarcerated for several weeks in "Botany Bay" before eventually being deported on 16 July. They were sent to France before making their way back to the United States.

Though he was absent from the country, O'Flanagan was re-elected as one of four Vice Presidents of Sinn Féin and as one of the nine members of the Officer Board at the Ard-Feis in early November 1924.

== Return to Ireland 1925 ==
On 21 February 1925 O'Flanagan arrived home from the United States to help the third incarnation of Sinn Féin contest a number of by-elections. Reformed in 1923 by de Valera, the third Sinn Féin "was a coalition of different elements, and while it no longer included any non-republicans it remained an uneasy combination of extremists and (relative) moderates, of ideologues and politicians, of fundamentalists and realists." Sinn Féin had won 44 seats in the August 1923 general election, but abstained from taking their seats in the Dáil.

O'Flanagan was vocal in his dismay about the state of the country after the Civil War, governed by the pro-treaty Free State with the support of the Catholic church.

He expressed equally radical views on the abuse of power within the Catholic church and was highly critical of ecclesiastical interference and control over temporal affairs. "During several by-election campaigns in 1925 O'Flanagan heaped abuse on Ireland's bishops for their extreme political partisanship. He denounced attempts to turn 'churches into political meeting places by making stupid, ill-informed political speeches from the altar.'" O'Flanagan was outraged that the Sacraments were being used as a weapon, and that republicans were being harassed from the pulpits. Increasingly disillusioned with Sinn Féin's policy of abstention he began to consider other means to enter the Free State parliament. In a clandestine visit to Rome to visit Monsignor John Hagan, de Valera worked out his formula to bypass the Oath. In April O'Flanagan was suspended from clerical duties by Bishop Coyne and forbidden to say mass, because of his outspoken nationalist activities and the anti-clerical speeches he had made in America and for delivering "dis-edifying harangues to excited mobs at five places in the diocese of Elphin." His opinions, especially his views on the Catholic church alarmed some of the more devout and politically ambitious members of Sinn Féin. Silenced again, he maintained his radical stance on social issues writing a series of articles in the republican journal An Phoblacht between June and December 1925.

In September "Fr. Michael O'Flanagan and Eamonn Donnelly TD and Republican MP for Armagh, were arrested by the RUC, at a concert at Derrymacash, near Lurgan, on September 26. Held overnight, they were put, next day upon a train for Dublin."

=== Sinn Féin split 1926 ===
On 9–11 March 1926, an extraordinary Ard-Fheis was summoned by de Valera. There he tabled a proposal that Sinn Féin members should be free to enter the Free State Oireachtas if the Oath of Allegiance were removed. "He was prepared to 'take the risks and go after the people'; he would take 'the bog road' instead of 'the High road.'" O'Flanagan possibly expected this, since rumours that "a number of Irregulars are in favour of entry to the Dáil" had been circulating since January. O'Flanagan tabled a counter motion stating:

That it is incompatible with the fundamental principles of Sinn Féin as it is injurious to the honour of Ireland, to send representatives into any usurping legislature set up by English law in Ireland.

De Valera left to found Fianna Fáil, and the majority of the more talented members of Sinn Féin followed him, leaving behind the rump Sean Lemass referred to as a "galaxy of cranks."

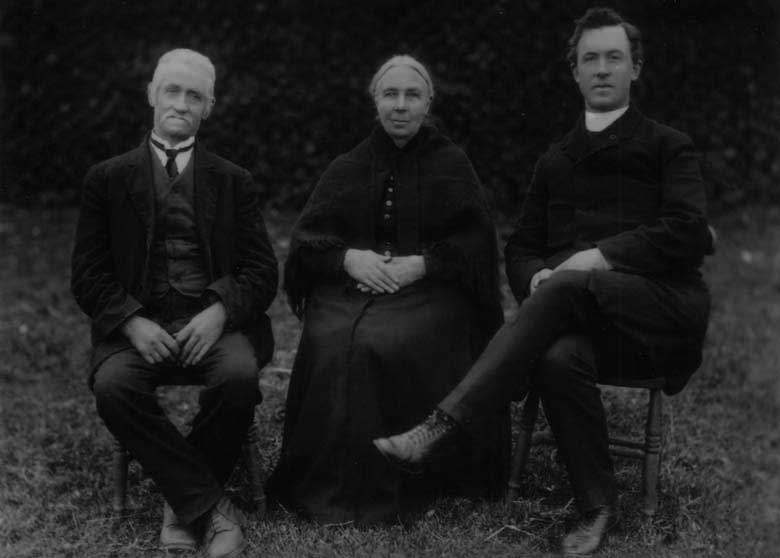
An undated photograph of Michael O'Flanagan with his parents Edward and Mary.

Bishop Coyne died of a seizure July 1926, and was replaced by Edward Doorly. On 20 October 1927 when his father Edward O'Flanagan died, the ban on O'Flanagan's ministry was revoked by Fr. Harte, allowing him to celebrate the funeral mass. Harte was vicar general while bishop Doorly was away in Rome.

O'Flanagan considered his ban removed, though he did not celebrate mass in public and was never promoted within the hierarchy. O'Flanagan remained with the reduced "galaxy of cranks" in Sinn Féin. From this time onwards he began to turn his attention towards his inventions and historical research.

De Valera's new party quickly eclipsed Sinn Féin at the June 1927 election. It became obvious, with hindsight, that de Valera had engineered the split to suit his needs.

O'Flanagan remained friends with union leader James Larkin and though he expressed some Marxist sentiment, never joined any left-wing group. Having no clerical income while he was suspended, O'Flanagan travelled to the United States for a number of months each year, giving lectures on his historical work and the Irish political situation. He produced a brochure in 1926 advertising lectures such as: Ireland Today, Political and Economic; Irish Literature, Gaelic and English; Ireland's Ancient Leadership in Europe. Illustrated with slides. A lecture he gave at Tara Halls in New York, Thursday evening, 30 June 1927 titled "Church and Politics" was printed as a pamphlet and sold.

=== Inventions ===
O'Flanagan had an interest in inventions and over the years filed patents for many of them. He applied for a patent for a gyroscopic travel bed designed for long-distance ocean voyages (of which he had plenty of experience) in 1923. In 1936 he patented his design for a cavity wall insulation product. O'Flanagan was a keen open-water swimmer, and describes in his memoir his habit of nightly swimming while living in Mullaghmore.

He filed patents for his most famous invention, a set of protective swimming goggles known as Suil and Ron, or the Seal's Eye, in 1926 and again in 1930. By the late 1920s, when he had no income from the Church, he was selling his goggles by mail order from his home in Bray, County Wicklow, advertising them in the Catholic Bulletin and on his lecture tours in the USA. The Father O'Flanagan Patent Goggles were the first real replacement for motorcycle goggles. They became popular for long-distance swimmers such as International Marathon Swimming Hall of Fame Honor Swimmer Abilio Alvaro Da Costa Couto of Brazil. Four months after his death, in November 1942, O'Flanagan was awarded a prize for his goggles at an exhibition of scientific inventions held in the Mansion House in Dublin.

=== Ordnance Survey letters ===
O'Flanagan became immersed in academic work from the mid-1920s. He undertook the task of editing the many hand-written volumes of letters by John O'Donovan and other collectors in Ordnance Survey of Ireland notebooks, a project of colossal scope. Some of the papers had been stored at the Ordnance Survey depot in the Phoenix Park, and members of the Gaelic League, concerned that the papers might be destroyed, had been attempting to make copies under the cover of Michael O'Rahlly's Irish Topographical Society.

O'Flanagan revived, funded and managed the project, editing the handwritten letters into typed transcripts, making multiple copies for each county. These records are invaluable, and are still being used by Irish archaeologists, and O'Flanagan's name appears in the notes of countless papers as Ordnance Survey editor. In his 1927 lecture, Church and Politics, O'Flanagan describes how he funded the massive undertaking using a donation from supporters in America, and mentions the vast amounts of documents destroyed in the Four Courts bombardments. The first instalment was used to hire a typist who worked on the letters for the next two years. O'Flanagan placed copies in the National Library of Ireland, University College, Dublin and the Public Library of Belfast, and another set in the Public Library in New York.

In the 1930s he undertook further historical work when he was commissioned by the government to write a series of county histories in the Irish language for use in National schools; five of the ten parts were published in his lifetime.

== President of Sinn Féin ==
O'Flanagan was elected president of Sinn Féin in October 1933 and held that position until 1935. Brian O'Higgins resigned from the party in protest at O'Flanagan's presidency. For his presidential address at the annual Sinn Féin Ard-Fheis on 14 October 1934, O'Flanagan gave a speech titled "The Strength of Sinn Féin," where he traced the evolution of the party through several incarnations and splits from his unique perspective. O'Flanagan was an active member of the National Graves Association, and in 1935 he unveiled the Moore's Bridge memorial in Kildare in memory of seven republican volunteers executed by the Free State in December 1922. Sinn Féin lacked energy and vision in the mid-1930s. The 1935 Árd Fhéis of Sinn Féin, held in Wynn's Hotel, Dublin, was chaired by O'Flanagan, back after a recent illness. In his address he "stated that Sinn Féin would have contested the recent Galway by-election had they had a candidate of personality. "Sceilg," Count Plunkett and Tom Maguire had each been asked but had refused." "In a statement on the Sunday resumption, Father O'Flanagan expressed the opinion that behind the war in Abyssinia lay the threat of Italy breaking Britain's hold upon the Mediterranean."

In January 1936, after 26 years of membership O'Flanagan was expelled from the Sinn Féin party. Purists in the party such as Brian O'Higgins and Mary MacSwiney had long resented O'Flanagan, and they dismissed him because he took part in a radio re-enactment of the opening of the First Dáil.

=== Spanish Civil War ===
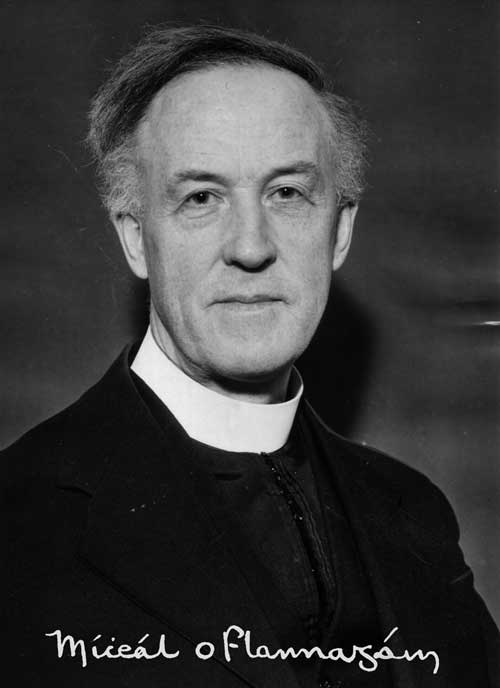
1937 Portrait of O'Flanagan, taken in America while he was fund-raising during the Spanish Civil War.

When the Spanish Civil War broke out on 18 July 1936, O'Flanagan was one of the only Irish Catholic priests, and indeed one of the only members of Sinn Féin, to defend the legitimacy of the Spanish Republic. While de Valera and the Irish Government retained a policy of neutrality and non-intervention, the Irish Catholic Bishops were almost violently pro-Franco, and sanctioned church gate collections to raise money for the national cause. Eoin O'Duffy, former Free State chief of police and leader of the Blueshirts, sailed from Galway taking some 800 men with him to fight for the national cause. Some sixty Irish socialists and republicans led by Frank Ryan went to fight with the International Brigades in what became known as the Connolly Column.

O'Flanagan threw himself into the campaign against Franco. On 3 December 1936 he chaired a meeting in the engineers hall in Dublin, where George Gilmore, recently back from Spain, Hanna Sheehy-Skeffington and Frank Ryan presented alternate views to the raging pro-Franco propaganda. On 17 January 1937 O'Flanagan and Basque priest Fr. Ramon Laborda spoke at a packed meeting in the Gaiety Theatre.

On 17 April O'Flanagan set off once again for America, where he spent a month lecturing and raising funds for the republican cause and collecting donations for food, clothing and medical supplies. However, Irish Catholics in America were strongly pro-Franco, who was seen as opposing Communism, and O'Flanagan's month-long visit was opposed by many members of the North American hierarchy, who questioned his credentials and warned people not to be taken in nor to contribute funds to his cause. An Irish Foodship for Spain, chaired by O'Flanagan, was set up in Dublin in 1938.

On the second anniversary of the beginning of the Spanish conflict, O'Flanagan was invited to America again as a keynote speaker at a huge rally, held on 19 July 1938 in Madison Square Garden, organised by the Confederated Spanish Societies to Aid Spain. The content of his speech again aroused the fury of the North American hierarchy.

In September 1938 the International Brigades were disbanded and sent home. Forty-four members of the Connolly Column had died in combat, while their leader Frank Ryan had been captured and was in prison in Burgos. When the last members of the Connolly Column arrived back in Dublin on 10 December 1938, they were met at Abbey Street and welcomed home by O'Flanagan. At a commemorative meeting in Molesworth Hall, Dublin, after speeches by Roddy Connolly, Terry O'Flanagan and Jim Prendergast, both of whom had fought in the conflict, O'Flanagan unveiled a banner remembering the men who had died in Spain. At the end of December O'Flanagan travelled to Spain where he spoke at meetings in Barcelona and Madrid, and also met with representatives of the Republican government.

On 3 April 1939, after much lobbying by his friends and supporters, O'Flanagan was restored to his full clerical faculties by the Bishop of Elphin, Edward Doorly. In retirement he lived in Sandyford, Dublin, and acted as chaplain at the Carmelite Convents in Kilmacud and Roebuck, and the Convalescent Home of the Sisters of Charity in Kilternan. Asked about his beliefs in later years, he replied:

I've been thinking recently where the Catholic Church has failed. It seems to me we have omitted the whole of Christ's teaching. We are introduced to Christ as a babe, absolutely overshadowed by His mother. Then you hear almost nothing about Him until His death. If I were to write a biography of a mere man, his birth and then his death, what kind of biography would that be – nothing about the object of his life?

== Death and funeral ==
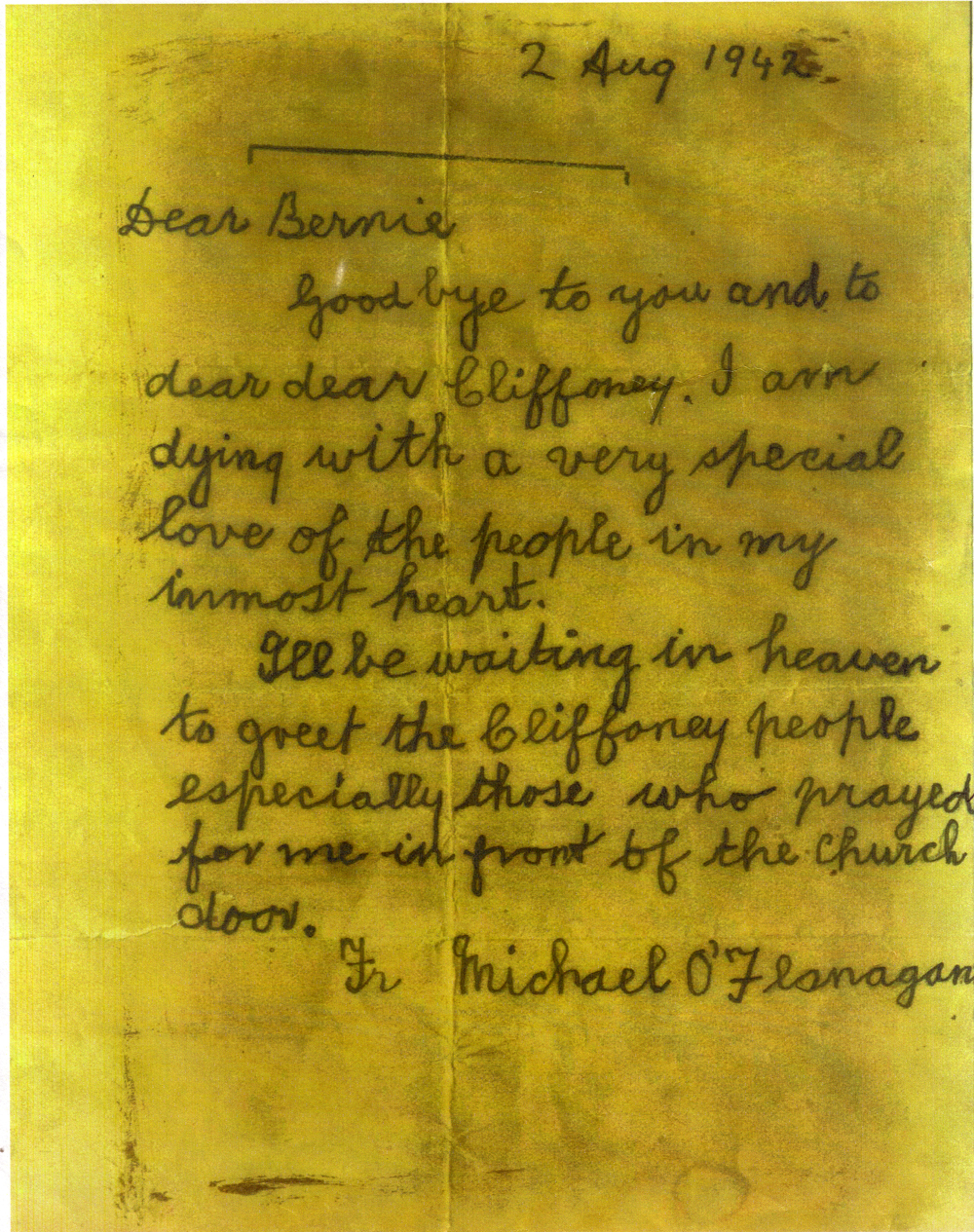
Michael O'Flanagan's last letter, sent to his old friend Bernie Conway in Cliffoney, 2 August 1942.

After a short illness in the nursing home at 7 Mount Street Crescent, Dublin, O'Flanagan died of stomach cancer on at 4.30 pm on Friday 7 August 1942, within a few days of his sixty-sixth birthday.

His last letter was to Bernie Conway of Cliffoney, dated 2 August 1942:

Dear Bernie, Good bye to you and to dear dear Cliffoney. I am dying with a very special love of the people in my inmost heart. I'll be waiting in heaven to greet the Cliffoney people, especially those who prayed for me in front of the church door. —Michael O'Flanagan.

O'Flanagan was given a state funeral, organised by Sean Fitzpatrick of the ITGWU. His remains lay in state in the Round Room in City Hall, where he had made his speech at O'Donovan Rossa's funeral in 1915. His remains were laid out in an open coffin and guarded by veterans of the War of Independence and 21,000 people, including Éamon de Valera came to pay their respects.

O'Flanagan is buried in the Republican Plot in Glasnevin Cemetery, between Maude Gonne and Austin Stack. The graveside oration, given by his old friend Sceilg, was later printed and published by the National Aid Auxiliary Committee, Dublin, 1942. This pamphlet, titled "Fr. Michael O'Flanagan: Sceilg's Graveside Oration, August 10, 1942," has become a collector's item.

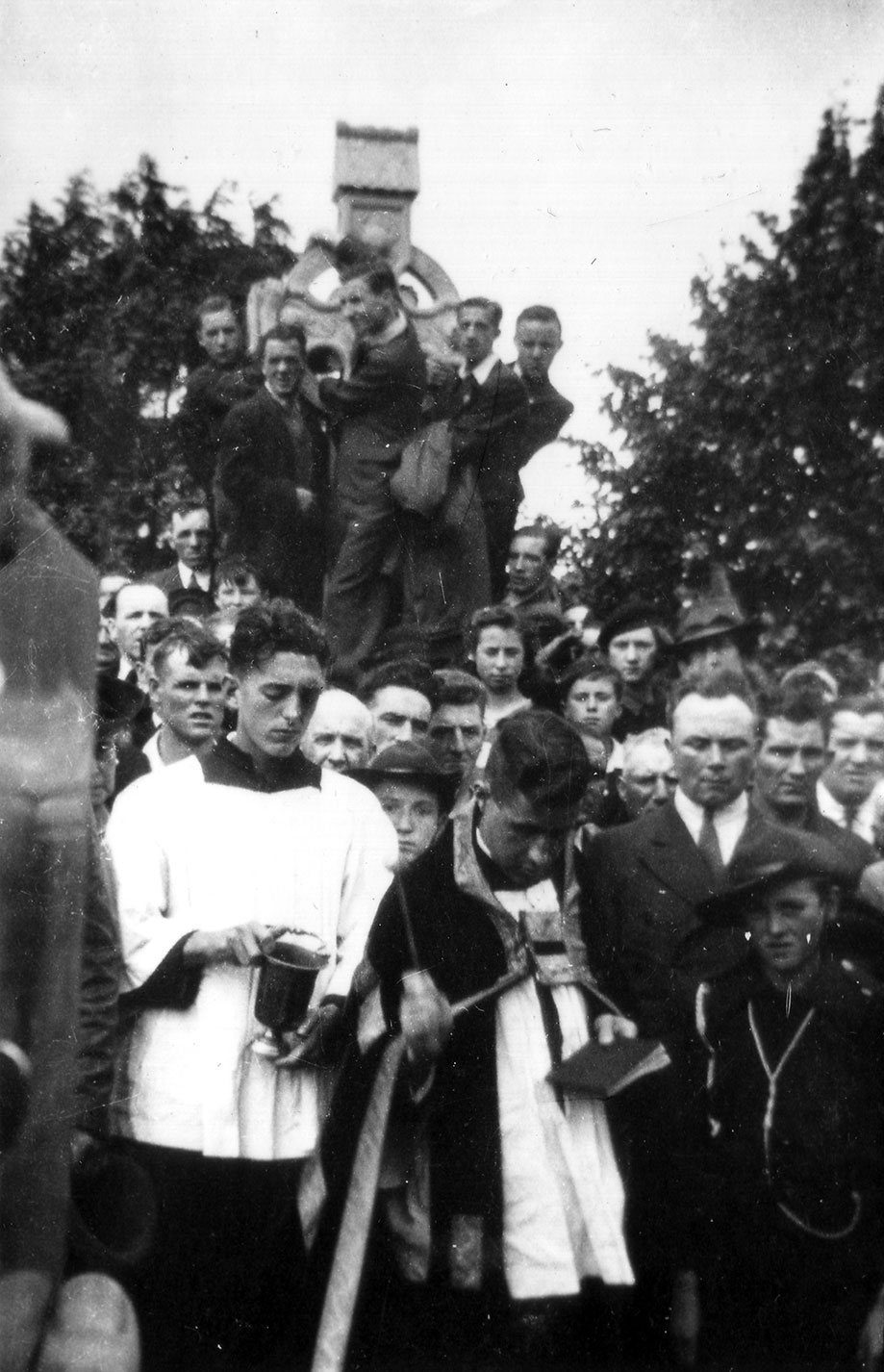
O'Flanagan's funeral, Republican Plot, Glasnevin cemetery, 10 August 1942.

A memorial font was placed in the porch of Cliffoney church, but the Catholic Church would not allow Fr. O'Flanagan's name to be added, so the font was adorned with a plain Latin cross and the date 1943. O'Flanagan was described in a memoir by Sean O'Casey as "An unselfish man, a brilliant speaker, with a dangerous need of more respect for bishops dressed in a little brief authority; a priest spoiled by too many good qualities." In 1954 C. Desmond Greaves, editor of the Irish Democrat, fearing O'Flanagan's memory was becoming lost to the younger generation, published a booklet titled "Father Michael O'Flanagan: Republican Priest." In 1992 a plaque with O'Flanagan's name was finally permitted by the Catholic church. The unveiling was attended by Pat O'Flanagan, a grand-nephew of O'Flanagan, and Thomas Hargadon, the last living member of the 1942 memorial committee. A memorial was placed on his grave by the National Graves Association in 1992 to mark the 50th anniversary of his death. A memorial commemoration organised by the National Graves Association was held at O'Flanagan's grave in Glasnevin cemetery on 25 August 2019. After an oration delivered by Tommy McKearney a new Celtic cross headstone was unveiled.

Party political offices
Preceded by Thomas Kelly (1910–?); Jennie Wyse Power (1911–?)	Vice President of Sinn Féin; 1917–1923; With: Arthur Griffith (1917–1922)	Succeeded by Kathleen Lynn; P. J. Ruttledge
Preceded by Brian O'Higgins	President of Sinn Féin; 1933–1935	Succeeded by Cathal Ó Murchadha
