= Minister for Fine Arts =

Former Irish government cabinet minister

The minister for fine arts was a position in the Ministry of Dáil Éireann, the government of the Irish Republic, a self-declared state which was established in 1919 by Dáil Éireann, the parliamentary assembly made up of the majority of Irish MPs elected in the 1918 general election. The post was in existence only in the ministry formed at the beginning of the Second Dáil, being abolished when Plunkett resigned in protest of the Anglo-Irish Treaty.

== Minister for Fine Arts ==
Name	Term of office		Political party	Government
George Noble Plunkett	26 August 1921	9 January 1922	Sinn Féin	3rd DM
