= 1922 Seanad =

Members of the Seanad from 1922 to 1925

1925 Seanad	→

Overview
- Legislative body: Seanad Éireann
- Jurisdiction: Irish Free State
- Meeting place: Leinster House
- Term: 11 December 1922 – 5 December 1925
- Government: 1st Executive Council (1922–1923); 2nd Executive Council (1923–1927)
- Members: 60
- Cathaoirleach: Lord Glenavy (Ind)
- Leas-Chathaoirleach: James G. Douglas (Ind)

The 1922 Seanad was the part of the Seanad of the Irish Free State (1922–1936) in office from the establishment of the Seanad in 1922 to the 1925 Seanad election. Elections to the Seanad, the Senate of the Oireachtas (parliament of the Irish Free State), took place on a triennial basis, with senators elected in stages. The 1922 Seanad included 30 members nominated by the President of the Executive Council and the 30 members elected by the Dáil in the 1922 Seanad election. It was first constituted on 8 December 1922.

It sat as a second chamber to 3rd Dáil elected at the 1922 general election and the 4th Dáil elected at the 1923 general election. The Seanad of the Irish Free State was not numbered after each election, with the whole period later considered the First Seanad.

== Initial membership ==
During the negotiations in 1921 of the Anglo-Irish Treaty, Arthur Griffith gave assurances to southern unionists and the British government that unionists would have adequate representation in the new parliament to safeguard their interests. Griffith himself died in August 1922, and was succeeded as President of Dáil Éireann by W. T. Cosgrave. The 3rd Dáil, elected in June 1922 as a "provisional parliament" or "constituent assembly", approved the Constitution of the Irish Free State in September, and continued as the Dáil of the new Free State when the Constitution came into force on 6 December 1922.

Article 12 of the Constitution established the Oireachtas as a bicameral legislature consisting of a Chamber of Deputies called Dáil Éireann and a Senate called Seanad Éireann. The Constitution specified a 60-seat Seanad, with senators serving 12-year terms and divided into four cohorts with one cohort re-elected every three years.

Article 82 of the Constitution provided that the composition of the 1922 Seanad was to be 30 elected by the Dáil and 30 nominated by the President of the Executive Council who should "have special regard to the providing of representation for groups or parties not then adequately represented in Dáil Éireann". Those elected by the Dáil would provide the first and third, for re-election in 1925 and 1931; while those nominated by the President would provide the second and fourth cohorts, for re-election in 1928 and 1934. In October 1922, the provisional parliament passed a resolution moved by W. T. Cosgrave which stated that the President should "consult with representative persons and bodies, including the following: Chamber of Commerce, the Royal College of Physicians of Ireland, the Royal College of Surgeons in Ireland, the benchers of the Honourable Society of King's Inns, Dublin, the Incorporated Law Society of Ireland, Councils of the County Boroughs of the Irish Free State". Cosgrave announced his selection in the Dáil on 6 December 1922, immediately after his election as president had been ratified by the Governor-General. The 15 who would serve 12-year terms were selected by lot. The 1922 Seanad election by members of the Dáil took place on 7 December.

Of the sixty members of the 1922 Seanad, 36 were Catholic, 20 were Protestant, 3 were Quakers and 1 was Jewish. It contained 7 peers, a dowager countess (Ellen, Countess of Desart, who was Jewish), 5 baronets and several knights. The New York Times remarked that the first senate was "representative of all classes". It was described in 2008 as "the most curious political grouping in the history of the Irish state".

On 26 November 1924, Alice Stopford Green presented to the Seanad a vellum parchment signed by all but one (Note: The exception was Eamonn Mansfield, who resigned before taking his seat. Signatories included Thomas MacPartlin (died 1923) and later Douglas Hyde and John O'Neill (elected in 1925).) member of the 1922–1925 Seanad, in an ornate casket commissioned from Mia Cranwill based on Gallarus Oratory. After the abolition of the Seanad in 1936, the casket was donated to the Royal Irish Academy.

== Cathaoirleach ==
When the Seanad first convened on 11 December 1922, Sir Thomas Esmonde proposed that George Sigerson, as the oldest member, sit as temporary chairman. This was seconded by Alice Stopford Green and agreed by the Seanad. Sigerson sat again as temporary chairman on the following day. Later on 12 December, Lord Glenacy was proposed by John MacLoughlin and seconded by Henry Guinness for the position of chairman for one year. This was agreed without a vote, but with Maurice George Moore and Jennie Wyse Power speaking against. On the same day, James Douglas was proposed by Edward MacLysaght and seconded by James Moran for the position of vice-chairman for one year, and this was agreed by the Seanad. Their positions were confirmed on 12 December 1923.

== Party composition ==
The following table shows the composition by party when the 1922 Seanad first met on 11 December 1922.

Party	Seats
Cumann na nGaedheal	13
Labour	4
Farmers' Party	1
Independent	42
Total	60

== List of senators ==
1922 Seanad
Term	Name	Party
Elected for 3 years	Henry Barniville	Cumann na nGaedheal
Elected for 3 years	Thomas Westropp Bennett	Cumann na nGaedheal
Elected for 3 years	Richard A. Butler	Independent
Elected for 3 years	John Counihan	Independent
Elected for 3 years	Peter de Loughry	Cumann na nGaedheal
Elected for 3 years	Cornelius Irwin	Cumann na nGaedheal
Elected for 3 years	Thomas Linehan	Farmers' Party
Elected for 3 years	Joseph Clayton Love	Cumann na nGaedheal
Elected for 3 years	Edward McEvoy	Cumann na nGaedheal
Elected for 3 years	Edward MacLysaght	Independent
Elected for 3 years	Eamonn Mansfield	Independent
Elected for 3 years	George Nesbitt	Independent
Elected for 3 years	Michael O'Dea	Cumann na nGaedheal
Elected for 3 years	J. T. O'Farrell	Labour
Elected for 3 years	James Parkinson	Cumann na nGaedheal
Nominated for 6 years	John Philip Bagwell	Independent
Nominated for 6 years	Henry Givens Burgess	Independent
Nominated for 6 years	Lord Glenavy	Independent
Nominated for 6 years	Sir Nugent Everard	Independent
Nominated for 6 years	Edmund W. Eyre	Independent
Nominated for 6 years	Oliver St. John Gogarty	Cumann na nGaedheal
Nominated for 6 years	James Perry Goodbody	Independent
Nominated for 6 years	Henry Greer	Independent
Nominated for 6 years	Benjamin Haughton	Independent
Nominated for 6 years	Earl of Wicklow	Independent
Nominated for 6 years	Arthur Jackson	Independent
Nominated for 6 years	Andrew Jameson	Independent
Nominated for 6 years	Sir Bryan Mahon	Independent
Nominated for 6 years	Marquess of Headfort	Independent
Nominated for 6 years	W. B. Yeats	Independent
Elected for 9 years	William Barrington	Independent
Elected for 9 years	Eileen Costello	Independent
Elected for 9 years	James G. Douglas	Independent
Elected for 9 years	Michael Duffy	Labour
Elected for 9 years	Thomas Farren	Labour
Elected for 9 years	Alice Stopford Green	Independent
Elected for 9 years	Sir John Griffith	Independent
Elected for 9 years	Patrick W. Kenny	Cumann na nGaedheal
Elected for 9 years	James J. MacKean	Cumann na nGaedheal
Elected for 9 years	John MacLoughlin	Independent
Elected for 9 years	Thomas MacPartlin	Labour
Elected for 9 years	William Molloy	Independent
Elected for 9 years	Maurice George Moore	Independent
Elected for 9 years	Brian O'Rourke	Cumann na nGaedheal
Elected for 9 years	William O'Sullivan	Cumann na nGaedheal
Nominated for 12 years	Earl of Mayo	Independent
Nominated for 12 years	Countess of Desart	Independent
Nominated for 12 years	James Charles Dowdall	Independent
Nominated for 12 years	Sir Thomas Esmonde	Independent
Nominated for 12 years	Martin Fitzgerald	Independent
Nominated for 12 years	Earl of Granard	Independent
Nominated for 12 years	Henry Guinness	Independent
Nominated for 12 years	Sir John Keane	Independent
Nominated for 12 years	James Moran	Independent
Nominated for 12 years	Earl of Kerry	Independent
Nominated for 12 years	Sir Horace Plunkett	Independent
Nominated for 12 years	Sir Hutcheson Poë	Independent
Nominated for 12 years	George Sigerson	Independent
Nominated for 12 years	Earl of Dunraven and Mount-Earl	Independent
Nominated for 12 years	Jennie Wyse Power	Independent

== Changes ==
Date	Term	Loss	Gain	Note
12 December 1922	Elected for 3 years	Independent		Resignation of Eamonn Mansfield
21 February 1923	Elected till 1925		Labour	William Cummins elected at a by-election
20 October 1923	Elected for 9 years	Labour		Death of Thomas MacPartlin
28 November 1923	Elected till 1925		Labour	Thomas Foran elected at a by-election
20 November 1923	Nominated for 12 years	Independent		Resignation of Sir Horace Plunkett (Note: Plunkett submitted his resignation on 14 November 1923, but it was not accepted until 28 November.)
12 December 1923	Elected till 1925		Independent	Samuel Lombard Brown elected at a by-election
9 December 1924	Nominated for 12 years	Independent		Resignation of Sir Hutcheson Poë
4 February 1925	Elected till 1925		Independent	Douglas Hyde elected at a by-election
17 February 1925	Nominated for 12 years	Independent		Death of George Sigerson
5 March 1925	Elected till 1925		Cumann na nGaedheal	John O'Neill elected at a by-election

== Sources ==
- Constitution of the Irish Free State
- "1922 Seanad". Oireachtas Members Database. Archived from the original on 7 April 2010.
- "Seanad Debates: 1922 Seanad". Oireachtas.
- Department of Local Government (February 1923). Report on the conduct of the first election to Seanad Éireann (PDF). Official publications. Vol. P.Pro 2/1923.
