= 1922 Seanad election =

The 1922 Seanad comprised 30 nominated members and 30 elected members. An election to 30 of the 60 seats in Seanad Éireann, the senate of the Irish Free State, was held on 7 December 1922. The electorate consisted of the members of Dáil Éireann (TDs) who had taken the Oath of Allegiance.

The election was required by Article 82 of the Constitution of the Irish Free State, one of the transitory provisions to bring the state's institutions into being. Article 82 specified that 30 of the first senators would be elected by the Free State's Dáil and the other 30 nominated by the President of the Free State's Executive Council. The procedure to be used was specified in a resolution of 1 November made by the 3rd Dáil (sitting as a Provisional Parliament) and published in Iris Oifigiúil on 7 November. The Dáil debated whether the election should be before or after the President's nominations and resolved on the latter course. On 6 December, the day the Constitution came into force, the President, W. T. Cosgrave, announced his 30 appointees to the 3rd Dáil (now sitting as the 1st Free State Dáil). The election of senators by TDs was conducted on 7 December 1922 by single transferable vote as a single 30-member contest. A candidate for election had to be nominated and seconded by a TD; many were nominated by Cosgrave from among those submissions from various public bodies whom he had not included in his 30 appointees. Nominations closed at midday on 7 December; ballots were distributed at 3 p.m., the poll closed at 5 p.m., and counting began immediately. At 8 p.m., the Ceann Comhairle, who was also the returning officer, announced the result would not be known for some time, and the Dáil was adjourned. Cosgrave had announced the assassination of Seán Hales. Eighty-one TDs voted; none of the abstentionist TDs were eligible to vote or nominate candidates. (Note: Not having subscribed to the Oath of Allegiance, they could not sign the roll, which was required by regulations 2 (nomination) and 11 (voting).) To facilitate transfer of fractions of votes, each initial vote's value was multiplied by 1000, giving a quota of 2,613. (Note: 2,613 = floor(81,000/(30 + 1)) + 1.) Eighteen candidates were elected on the first count: one with four (4,000) first-preference votes and 17 others with three (3,000) each. The report on the conduct of the election speculated that groups of three TDs had coordinated their votes to ensure a candidate exceeded the quota. Candidates with equal numbers of first-preference votes were ranked by the number of second preferences and so on. The remaining twelve Senators were elected in 34 subsequent counts. Counting was completed after midnight, the results were announced next afternoon, and the Seanad first assembled on 11 December 1922.

== Result ==
There were 35 counts and 112 candidates, of whom:

- 18 received three or four first-preference votes and were elected on the first count
- 11 received two first-preference votes and were elected on subsequent counts
- 4 received one first-preference vote, of whom one was elected on the final count
- 8 received no first-preference votes but some later-preference transfers; none was elected
- 71 accrued no votes and were eliminated on count 24

1922 Seanad election: 30 seats
Party	Candidate	FPv%	%	Seat	Count
Independent	Alice Stopford Green	4,000	4.94	1	1
Independent	Sir John Griffith	3,000	3.70	2	1
Independent	James G. Douglas	3,000	3.70	3	1
Cumann na nGaedheal	Brian O'Rourke	3,000	3.70	4	1
Independent	Maurice George Moore	3,000	3.70	5	1
Independent	William Molloy	3,000	3.70	6	1
Cumann na nGaedheal	James J. MacKean	3,000	3.70	7	1
Independent	Eileen Costello	3,000	3.70	8	1
Cumann na nGaedheal	William O'Sullivan	3,000	3.70	9	1
Independent	John MacLoughlin	3,000	3.70	10	1
Cumann na nGaedheal	Patrick W. Kenny	3,000	3.70	11	1
Independent	William Barrington	3,000	3.70	12	1
Labour	Michael Duffy	3,000	3.70	13	1
Labour	Thomas MacPartlin	3,000	3.70	14	1
Independent	Thomas Farren	3,000	3.70	15	1
Farmers' Party	Thomas Linehan	3,000	3.70	16	1
Labour	J. T. O'Farrell	3,000	3.70	17	1
Independent	Richard A. Butler	3,000	3.70	18	1
Cumann na nGaedheal	Thomas Westropp Bennett	2,000	2.47	19	2
Cumann na nGaedheal	Henry Barniville	2,000	2.47	20	6
Cumann na nGaedheal	Peter de Loughry	2,000	2.47	21	9
Cumann na nGaedheal	Cornelius Irwin	2,000	2.47	22	9
Independent	Eamonn Mansfield	2,000	2.47	23	15
Independent	Edward MacLysaght	2,000	2.47	24	26
Cumann na nGaedheal	Edward MacEvoy	2,000	2.47	25	35
Independent	George Nesbitt	1,000	1.23	26	35
Cumann na nGaedheal	Joseph Clayton Love	2,000	2.47	27	35
Cumann na nGaedheal	James Parkinson	2,000	2.47	28	35
Independent	John Counihan	2,000	2.47	29	35
Cumann na nGaedheal	Michael O'Dea	2,000	2.47	30	35
	Bryan Cooper	1,000	1.23		35
	James McNeill	0	0		34
	Denis McCullough	1,000	1.23		33
	Capt. Bernard Daly	1,000	1.23		32
	Michael Francis O'Brien	0	0		31
	Sir William Goulding	0	0		30
	Sir Henry McLaughlin	0	0		29
	Sir Simon Maddock	0	0		28
	Thomas Patrick McKenna	0	0		27
	P. F. Doyle	0	0		25
	Bulmer Hobson	0	0		24 (Note: Hobson was the only candidate eliminated on count 24 who had more than 0 votes; his 32 votes were distributed on count 25.)
	Edward Andrews	0	0		24
	Walter Baird	0	0		24
	David Barry	0	0		24
	Sir Andrew Beattie	0	0		24
	Sir Edward Bellingham	0	0		24
	Henry T. Bewley	0	0		24
	Alexander Findlater Blood	0	0		24
	P. J. Brady	0	0		24
	Henry Brien	0	0		24
	Col. Loftus A. Bryan	0	0		24
	James Marmion Gilmor Carroll	0	0		24
	Arthur Chance	0	0		24
	Henry J. Concannon	0	0		24
	Henry D. Conner	0	0		24
	Robert Cutlar	0	0		24
	Sir Maurice Dockrell	0	0		24
	Patrick C. Dolan	0	0		24
	Barry Egan	0	0		24
	Godfrey Fetherstonhaugh	0	0		24
	William Field (Note: Before the election, the Ceann Comhairle announced that Field had asked for his name to be withdrawn.)	0	0		24
	Sir Henry J. Forde	0	0		24
	Charles Gamble	0	0		24
	John Garvey	0	0		24
	J. Harold Goodbody	0	0		24
	Michael Gough	0	0		24
	Sir Stanley Harrington	0	0		24
	William M. Hatte	0	0		24
	Maurice Healy	0	0		24
	Richard Hearne	0	0		24
	Sir Andrew J. Horne	0	0		24
	John J. Horgan	0	0		24
	William Ireland	0	0		24
	R. J. Kelly	0	0		24
	John Coleman Kiernan	0	0		24
	Patrick Leonard	0	0		24
	Thomas B. Lillis	0	0		24
	Marie Lynch	0	0		24
	Peter Lynch	0	0		24
	G. Lyons	0	0		24
	Sir Thomas Macardle	0	0		24
	W. McCarthy	0	0		24
	Joseph MacDermott	0	0		24
	Martin McDonogh	0	0		24
	David McDonald	0	0		24
	Joseph McLoughlin	0	0		24
	Patrick Mahon	0	0		24
	Thomas Spring Rice, 2nd Baron Monteagle of Brandon	0	0		24
	M. J. Moran	0	0		24
	Patrick John Munden	0	0		24
	Dr W. Lombard Murphy	0	0		24
	Sir Walter Nugent	0	0		24
	Laurence O'Brien	0	0		24
	The O'Conor Don	0	0		24
	Sean O'Farrell	0	0		24
	Stephen O'Mara	0	0		24
	Charles St. George Orpen	0	0		24
	Thomas Power	0	0		24
	Thomas George Quirke	0	0		24
	Thomas McClintock-Bunbury, 2nd Baron Rathdonnell	0	0		24
	Capt. P. D. Reavey	0	0		24
	G. R. Ryan	0	0		24
	James Shanks	0	0		24
	William Shannon	0	0		24
	M. D. Shaw	0	0		24
	John Smyth	0	0		24
	Patrick Tallon	0	0		24
	James Walsh	0	0		24
	Alexander Weir	0	0		24
	William de Courcy Wheeler	0	0		24
	James Whelan	0	0		24
	Joseph Withrington	0	0		24

== Sources ==
- "Seanad Éireann election result sheet" (PDF). Oireachtas. December 1922.
- Department of Local Government (February 1923). Report on the conduct of the first election to Seanad Éireann (PDF). Official publications. Vol. P.Pro 2/1923.
