= 1925 Seanad election =

- 17 September 1925

19 of 60 seats in Seanad Éireann 31 seats were needed for a majority
- Turnout: 23.4%
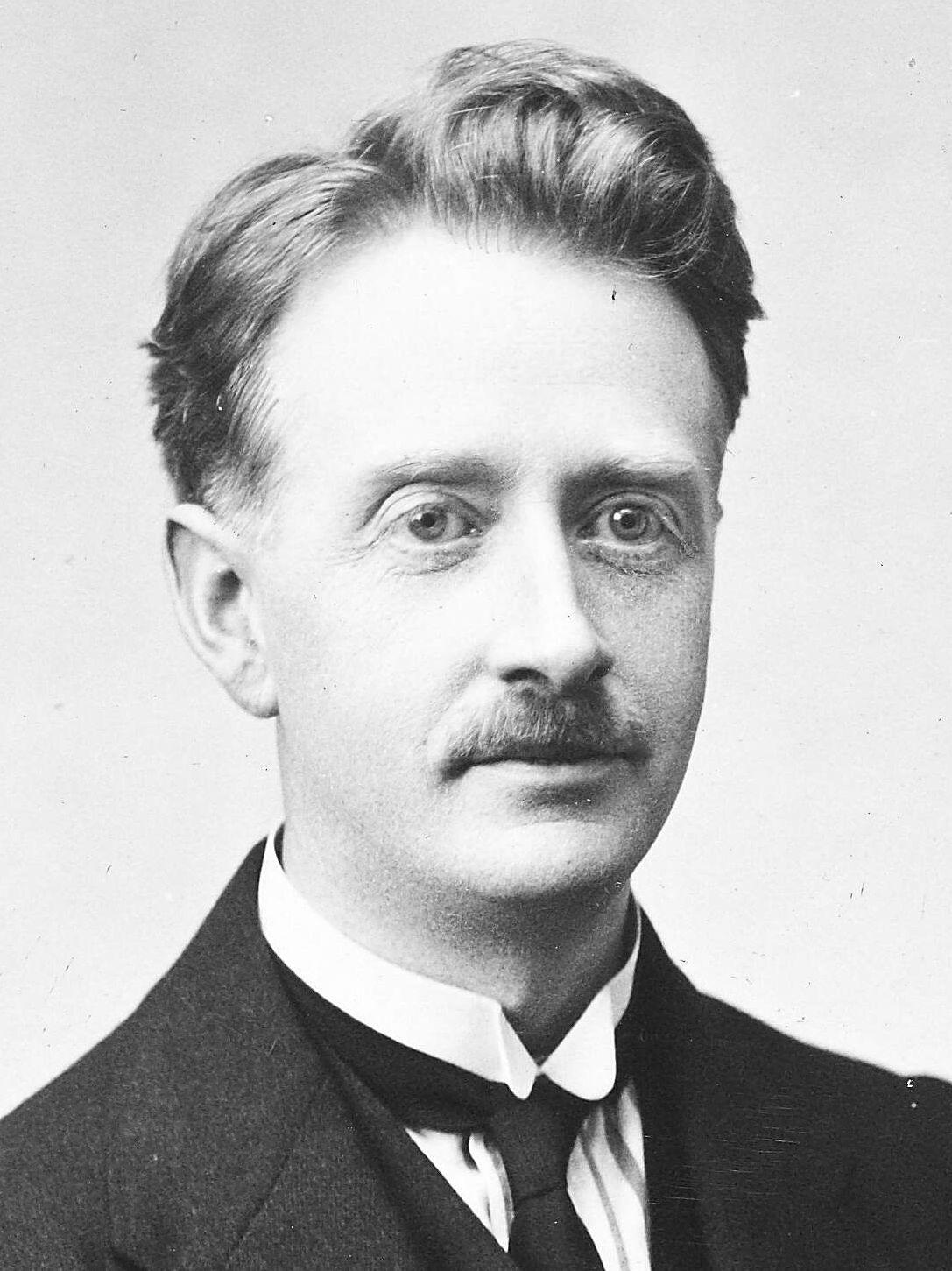

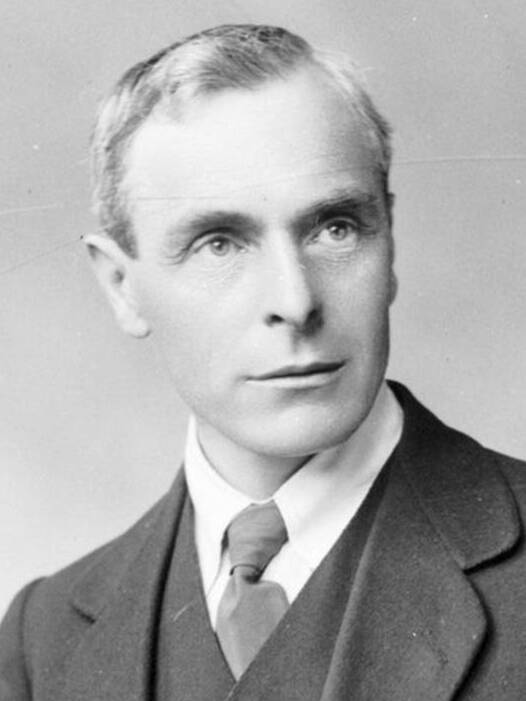

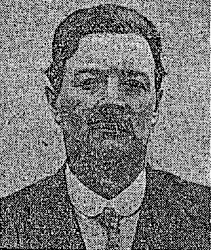
| | First party | Second party | Third party |
|---|---|---|---|
| Leader | W. T. Cosgrave | Thomas Johnson | Denis Gorey |
| Party | Cumann na nGaedheal | Labour | Farmers' Party |
| Leader since | April 1923 | 1922 | 1922 |
| Last election | 14 seats, 23.3% | 6 seats, 10% | 1 seats, 1.7% |
| Seats before | 14 | 6 | 1 |
| Seats won | 15 | 5 | 3 |
| Seat change | ▲1 | ▼1 | ▲2 |
| Popular vote | 126,218 | 46,776 | 42,785 |
| Percentage | 41.3% | 15.3% | 8.9% |

An election for 19 of the 60 seats in Seanad Éireann, the senate of the Irish Free State, was held on 17 September 1925. The election was by single transferable vote, with the entire country being used as a 19-seat constituency. These 19 joined the 41 continuing members of the 1922 Seanad to form the 1925 Seanad. The election saw eight Cumann na nGaedheal members elected (an advance of one compared to its pre-election representation), as well as three Labour Party (a drop of one seat), three Farmers' Party (an advance of two seats), and five others (a drop from seven previous to the election).

There were 76 candidates on the ballot paper. Voters ranked candidates by preference at least a few, but did not have to rank all of them. Although bearing multiple marked preferences, each vote was to be used to elect just one member in the end. Of the two main political parties, the larger (Cumann na nGaedheal) did not formally endorse any candidates, while the other (Sinn Féin, whose TDs were abstentionist) boycotted the election. Voter turnout was low, and the outcome was considered unsatisfactory by some.

In subsequent elections, senators were elected by the members of the Oireachtas rather than by the electorate.

== Vacancies ==
The 1922 Constitution of the Irish Free State provided for a Seanad of 60 members directly elected. Members would serve 12-year terms, with one-quarter of the house elected every three years. The members would be elected under the system of proportional representation by means of the single transferable vote in a single, nationwide, 15-seat contest. As well as this cohort up for election in 1925, four additional Senators were required to vacate their seats: these had been temporarily co-opted to fill casual vacancies that had arisen in previous years.

The 60 Senators were divided into four cohorts of 15, and an at-large election held every three years for one of the cohorts.

As part of the initial transitional measures, 30 of the first 60 senators were nominated by W. T. Cosgrave in his capacity of President of the Executive Council, and the other 30 were elected by the non-abstentionist TDs (members of the 3rd Dáil). The 1922 election was by single transferable vote from a single panel of candidates nominated by Cosgrave and the other TDs. The first 15 elected had a term of nine years and the other 15 a term of three years. It was the latter cohort whose seats were to be vacated for the 1925 election.

== Candidates ==
There were three methods of being included on the ballot. Outgoing Senators could nominate themselves for re-election, and all 19 did so. The Seanad could nominate a number of candidates equal to the number of vacancies (19), and the Dáil could nominate twice the number of vacancies (38). The Dáil and Seanad nominations were by single transferable vote and secret ballot. The minimum age for Senators was 35 years.

The Seanad resolved on 30 April to form a committee to decide procedure for its nominations; the committee drafted a resolution in June, which was amended and passed by the Seanad on 19 June. 29 applicants contested the Seanad nominations on 1 July. Apart from two Labour Party members, the candidates were Independents. 47 of the 60 Senators voted, including 18 of the 19 who were themselves standing for re-election. Donal O'Sullivan, clerk of the Seanad throughout its existence, suggests that these 18 had an incentive to vote for less popular candidates since the nominees would be rivals in the ensuing election. O'Sullivan describes the results as "a very great disappointment ... the list [of successful nominees] could not compare with the list of the ten rejected." Oliver St. John Gogarty made a similar remark in the Seanad itself after the results were announced.

The rejected ten were: David Barry, general manager of the British and Irish Steam Packet Company; Sir Laurence Grattan Esmonde, brother of Senator Thomas Grattan Esmonde, Bart; Lady Gregory; John Horgan; Hugh Law; John McCann, a stockbroker; The McGillicuddy of the Reeks; William Lombard Murphy, son of William Martin Murphy and proprietor of the Irish Independent; Sir John Harley Scott, a Unionist former Mayor of Cork; and J.J. Stafford, a County Wexford businessman.

Cumann na nGaedheal, the party which backed the incumbent government, decided not to formally support any candidates as a result of internal divisions. There was tension between ministers, backbenchers, and grassroots members, and between factions of Kevin O'Higgins and W. T. Cosgrave. The 1924 Army Mutiny had shaken the year-old party, and the appointment of public servants to lead the new state's institutions created resentment among those passed over. The parliamentary party held two selection conventions, on 2 and 6 July 1925, and when the leadership's candidates did badly a free vote was offered in the Dáil with all candidates nominally endorsed by the party.

The Dáil nominations were decided on 8 July. 57 candidates contested; 101 TDs voted, with one ballot deemed ineligible. 52 TDs did not vote, including all 44 abstentionist Sinn Féin TDs, who were ineligible to vote as they had not taken the Oath of Allegiance. TDs supported candidates on party lines. Of the 38 successful nominees, O'Sullivan classifies 21 as supporters of the Cumann na nGaedheal Government, 9 as Independent, 5 as in the Farmers' Party, and 3 as in the Labour Party. Four of the ten candidates rejected by the Seanad were also among the Dáil candidates, with John J. Horgan securing a nomination at the second attempt.

== Campaign ==
The usual Irish local, personal canvassing strategy was impractical across a nationwide constituency, leading to a relatively quiet campaign. While the Farmers' Party and Labour produced newspaper advertisements for their respective slates of candidates, Cumann na nGaedheal did not at a national level formally endorse candidates, even those its TDs had nominated. It presented the election as nonpartisan. It published a booklet, Who's who in the 1925 Senate Election, and did not oppose candidates "put forward by any of the elements that accept the State and Constitution", i.e. other than republicans opposed to the Anglo-Irish Treaty.

Numerous interest groups produced lists of approved candidates, including doctors, publicans, motorists, ex-servicemen's associations, and the livestock trade. Candidates endorsed by temperance groups fared badly. The Catholic Truth Society circulated, to little effect, a list of outgoing Senators it condemned for not having opposed a controversial motion pertaining to divorce.

Sinn Féin, under the leadership of Éamon de Valera, called for a boycott of the election. Sinn Féin had not boycotted the 1923 Dáil election, but rather contested it on an abstentionist platform. De Valera later led the new Fianna Fáil party, founded in 1926, into the Oireachtas after the June 1927 Dáil election.

== Election ==
The election was by single transferable vote, with the entire Irish Free State forming a single, 19-seat constituency. All citizens over 30 had a vote. Since the voting age for Dáil and local elections was 21, a separate electoral roll was maintained for the Seanad election.

The 76 candidates were arranged alphabetically on a ballot paper 22 inches (56 cm) long and 16 inches (41 cm) wide. The Electoral (Seanad Elections) Act 1925 was passed to allow the ballot to be presented as four parallel columns of 19 names rather than a single long column of all 76.

The low voter turnout was blamed on the Sinn Féin boycott, wet weather across the country, and the shorter than usual hours of polling. Turnout varied widely, from 8.2% in Mayo North to 43% in Monaghan. Another factor was the large, intimidating ballot paper; O'Sullivan described it as "a fiasco", saying it was unreasonable to expect voters to "make an intelligent choice of nineteen persons from a list containing seventy-six names, most of which they had never seen or heard of before." (though voters were not required to mark 19 choices.)

== Results ==
| Party | FP votes | % | Seats won |
|---|---|---|---|
| Cumann na nGaedheal supporters | 126,218 | 41.3 | 8 |
| Labour | 46,776 | 15.3 | 3 |
| Farmers' Party | 42,785 | 14.0 | 3 |
| Independent | 65,230 | 21.3 | 5 |
| Unknown affiliation | 24,692 | 8.1 | |
| Spoilt votes | 9,466 | – | |
| Total | 315,167 | 100 | |
| Electorate/Turnout | 1,347,195 | 23.4 | |
Source: Nohlen & Stöver

=== Counting ===
The ballots were initially collected to one centre within each Dáil constituency to count and sort the first-preference votes. This took almost a week. On 25 September, the ballots were sent to Dublin, the totals checked centrally, and redistribution of transfers begun. Initially there were 10 count officials, rising to 40 by the end. On 5 October, the first candidate was returned, on the 45th count. Counting continued until 19 October.

Harold Gosnell wrote that there was more news coverage of the count than of the preceding campaign: "the counting of the ballots under [STV] applied on a national scale attracts wide attention, and the results are sure to reflect the opinions (or lack of them) manifested by the electors".

=== Details ===
Although the election was national, many of the candidates relied on local support: 23 gained more than half their first preferences from their own constituency. Thus, STV proved itself both able to elect those with local support and those with thinly-spread dispersed support.

About 12% (37,714) of valid ballots were exhausted, found to be non-transferable when eligible for transfer. (One or more of the preferences marked on the ballots may have been elected, just without the help of that particular vote). Less than 3 percent of the ballots cast were spoiled.

About 260,000 of the 315,000 votes cast were used in the end to elect the 19 winners, an 85 percent rate of effective votes.

Candidates of the two parties contesting the election, the Labour Party and the Farmers' Party, did relatively well. Some interest groups also did well – vintners, ex-servicemen. Others did not — doctors, academics, women, and especially Irish language revivalists: all four candidates supported by the Gaelic League lost, including outgoing Senator and future president Douglas Hyde. The Irish Times (Sept. 24, 1925) reported that licensed liquor dealers, ex-soldiers, farmers, doctors and businessmen received their due in the election.

Ex-Unionist candidates did not fare well, even though the original design of the Seanad was intended in part to provide enhanced representation for the Unionist minority.

The quota (the amount guaranteed to secure election) was 15,286.

Thirteen were elected at the end, when the field of candidates was thinned to the number of remaining open seats in the 65th count, some of them were elected with less than the quota.

Results of the 1925 Seanad election
| Name | County | Occupation (Note: As listed on the official notice of election) | Nomination | First-preference votes | Final result | Final count | Party (Note: (pro-CnaG) indicates candidates identified by Coakley as unofficially pro-Cumann na nGaedheal) | Notes |
|---|---|---|---|---|---|---|---|---|
| Charles Austin | Galway | Director of various public companies and chairman of the Irish Branch of British Shareholders' Trust | Seanad | 734 | Eliminated | 7 | | Baron ffrench |
| Henry Barniville | Dublin | Surgeon | Outgoing | 8,279 | Elected w/o quota | 65 | | |
| Sir Edward Bellingham | Louth | Baronet | Seanad | 8,043 | Elected | 65 | | |
| Thomas Westropp Bennett | Limerick | Farmer | Outgoing | 7,117 | Elected w/o quota | 65 | (pro-CnaG) | |
| Sir Edward Coey Bigger | Dublin | Medical Doctor | Seanad | 5,658 | Elected w/o quota | 65 | | |
| P. J. Brady | Dublin | Solicitor | Seanad | 4,328 | Eliminated | 63 | | |
| Samuel Lombard Brown | Dublin | Barrister-at-law | Outgoing | 2,787 | Eliminated | 33 | | |
| Kathleen Browne | Wexford | Farmer | Seanad | 2,044 | Eliminated | 25 | (pro-CnaG) | Sought women's vote |
| Richard A. Butler | Dublin | Farmer | Outgoing | 5,943 | Eliminated | 61 | Farmers' Party | |
| Laurence Patrick Byrne | Dublin | Journalist | Dáil | 1,612 | Eliminated | 20 | Labour Party | Wrote under the pen name "Andrew E. Malone" |
| Francis Cahill | Dublin | Teacher | Dáil | 1,057 | Eliminated | 11 | (pro-CnaG) | |
| Sir Arthur Chance | Dublin | Surgeon | Seanad | 3,792 | Eliminated | 57 | | |
| Walter L. Cole | Dublin | Fruit merchant | Seanad | 1,393 | Eliminated | 19 | | |
| John Counihan | Dublin | Farmer | Outgoing | 6,431 | Elected w/o quota | 65 | (pro-CnaG) | Supporter of livestock trade |
| George Crosbie | Cork | Journalist | Dáil | 2,056 | Eliminated | 32 | (pro-CnaG) | |
| John Patrick Cuffe | Dublin | Farmer | Dáil | 3,180 | Eliminated | 35 | | Supporter of livestock trade |
| William Cummins | Kildare | National school teacher | Outgoing | 10,693 | Elected | 51 | Labour Party | |
| Peter de Loughry | Kilkenny | Iron founder and manufacturer | Outgoing | 5,938 | Eliminated | 60 | (pro-CnaG) | |
| Liam de Róiste | Cork | Secretary-director of public company | Dáil | 2,993 | Eliminated | 42 | (pro-CnaG) | |
| James Dillon | Kilkenny | Farmer | Dáil | 7,499 | Elected | 62 | Farmers' Party | |
| John Charles Eason | Dublin | Merchant | Dáil | 2,621 | Eliminated | 30 | (pro-CnaG) | Of Eason & Son newsagents. |
| Michael Fanning | Dublin | Grocer and vintner | Dáil | 9,024 | Elected w/o quota | 65 | | Licensed vintners' lobby |
| Darrell Figgis | Dublin | Author and Independent TD | Dáil | 512 | Eliminated | 4 | | Died by suicide on 27 October 1925 |
| Edward John Fitzgerald | Cork | Joiner | Seanad | 5,754 | Eliminated | 64 | Labour Party | |
| Thomas Foran | Dublin | Trade union official | Outgoing | 6,844 | Elected | 65 | Labour Party | |
| John William Garvey | Dublin | Solicitor | Dáil | 2,799 | Eliminated | 38 | | |
| Henry Harrison | Dublin | Journalist | Dáil | 2,000 | Eliminated | 22 | (pro-CnaG) | |
| Sir William Hickie | Tipperary | Major-General (retired) | Dáil | 9,712 | Elected | 45 | | Ex-servicemen's lobby |
| Patricia Hoey | Dublin | Journalist and industrial organiser | Seanad | 334 | Eliminated in 2nd Count | 1 | | Sought women's vote |
| Patrick Hooper | Dublin | Journalist and barrister-at-law | Seanad | 3,346 | Eliminated | 40 | | |
| John J. Horgan | Cork | Solicitor | Dáil | 2,037 | Eliminated | 23 | (pro-CnaG) | |
| Denis Houston | Dublin | Trade union organiser | Dáil | 4,828 | Eliminated | 50 | Labour Party | |
| Charles Howard-Bury | Westmeath | Lt.-Colonel (retired) | Seanad | 785 | Eliminated | 8 | | Ex-servicemen's lobby |
| Douglas Hyde | Dublin | Dean of the Celtic Faculty in the National University of Ireland | Outgoing | 1,721 | Eliminated | 28 | (pro-CnaG) | |
| Owen Hynes | Dublin | General secretary | Seanad | 1,273 | Eliminated | 18 | Labour Party | |
| Cornelius Irwin | Wexford | Farmer and businessman | Outgoing | 2,884 | Eliminated | 37 | (pro-CnaG) | |
| Joseph Johnston | Dublin | Fellow and tutor of Trinity College | Dáil | 1,168 | Eliminated | 14 | (pro-CnaG) | |
| Michael Jordan | Wexford | Farmer | Dáil | 4,777 | Eliminated | 49 | Farmers' Party | |
| Cornelius Kennedy | Wicklow | Merchant and farmer | Dáil | 11,857 | Elected | 54 | (pro-CnaG) | Licensed vintners' lobby |
| Denis Kennedy | Dublin | Surgeon | Dáil | 3,202 | Eliminated | 36 | (pro-CnaG) | Hospitals' lobby |
| Thomas Linehan | Cork | Farmer | Outgoing | 6,624 | Elected w/o quota | 65 | Farmers' Party | |
| Joseph Clayton Love | Cork | Merchant | Outgoing | 2,249 | Eliminated | 27 | (pro-CnaG) | |
| Anthony MacBride | Mayo | Surgeon | Dáil | 2,059 | Eliminated | 26 | (pro-CnaG) | |
| Alexander McCabe | Dublin | Estate agent | Dáil | 4,034 | Eliminated | 46 | | |
| Patrick McCartan | Dublin | Surgeon | Seanad | 626 | Eliminated | 5 | | |
| Seán Pádraig Mac Énrí | Galway | Medical doctor and university professor (Note: In Irish: "Dochtúir leighis agus ollamh ollsgoile") | Dáil | 1,636 | Eliminated | 21 | (pro-CnaG) | |
| Edward MacEvoy | Laois | Wholesale merchant | Outgoing | 5,423 | Eliminated | 56 | (pro-CnaG) | |
| Francis McGuinness | Longford | Merchant | Dáil | 7,662 | Elected w/o quota | 65 | (pro-CnaG) | |
| Thomas Patrick McKenna | Cavan | Farmer | Dáil | 5,768 | Eliminated | 55 | (pro-CnaG) | Grandfather of actor T. P. McKenna |
| Edward Patrick McLoughlin | Dublin | Medical profession | Dáil | 1,183 | Eliminated | 15 | (pro-CnaG) | |
| Edward MacLysaght | Clare | Proprietor of the Raheen Rural Industries | Outgoing | 4,025 | Eliminated | 48 | | |
| Patrick MacSwiney | Dublin | Gentleman | Dáil | 789 | Eliminated | 9 | (pro-CnaG) | Created a marquis in the Papal nobility by pope Leo XIII. |
| Jeremiah McVeagh | Dublin | Barrister-at-law | Dáil | 3,601 | Eliminated | 43 | | |
| Sir Simon Maddock | Dublin | Secretary and director of public companies | Dáil | 3,876 | Eliminated | 44 | | Business candidate |
| Seán Milroy | Dublin | Journalist | Dáil | 1,697 | Eliminated | 24 | (pro-CnaG) | |
| Mary Josephine Mulcahy | Dublin | Married woman | Seanad | 2,659 | Eliminated | 39 | | Wife of Richard Mulcahy, and sister of James Ryan |
| Daniel Nealon | Tipperary | National school teacher (retired) | Dáil | 1,278 | Eliminated | 16 | | |
| George Nesbitt | Dublin | Merchant and manufacturer | Outgoing | 1,210 | Eliminated | 17 | (pro-CnaG) | |
| Liam Ó Briain | Galway | Professor of Romance Languages in University College Galway | Seanad | 1,056 | Eliminated | 13 | | |
| Conor O'Brien | Dublin | Architect | Seanad | 497 | Eliminated | 3 | | |
| Joseph O'Connor | Kildare | Cattle salesman and farmer | Dáil | 6,740 | Elected w/o quota | 65 | (pro-CnaG) | Supporter of livestock trade |
| Michael O'Dea | Dublin | Merchant | Outgoing | 4,011 | Eliminated | 58 | (pro-CnaG) | |
| J. T. O'Farrell | Dublin | Irish Secretary Railway Clerks' Association | Outgoing | 12,336 | Elected | 51 | Labour Party | Railwaymen's candidate |
| Ristéard Ó Foghludha | Dublin | Manager (Note: In Irish: "Bainisteoird") | Dáil | 660 | Eliminated | 6 | (pro-CnaG) | |
| Michael F. O'Hanlon | Dublin | General secretary | Dáil | 8,238 | Elected | 59 | Farmers' Party | |
| Stephen O'Mara, Snr | Limerick | Merchant | Dáil | 6,205 | Elected w/o quota | 65 | (pro-CnaG) | |
| Seán Ó Murthuile | Dublin | Gentleman | Dáil | 1,022 | Eliminated | 10 | (pro-CnaG) | Caught up in the 1924 Irish Army Mutiny |
| John O'Neill | Wicklow | Cycle manufacturer and motor trader | Outgoing | 2,448 | Eliminated | 31 | (pro-CnaG) | |
| James Parkinson | Kildare | Veterinary surgeon and bloodstock breeder | Outgoing | 6,248 | Elected w/o quota | 65 | (pro-CnaG) | |
| Patrick Phelan | Kildare | Farmer | Dáil | 5,423 | Eliminated | 53 | Farmers' Party | |
| John Henry Pigot | Dublin | Barrister-at-law | Seanad | 413 | Eliminated | 2 | | Nephew of John Edward Pigot, and brother of Edward Pigot |
| John Ryan | Limerick | Farmer | Dáil | 4,281 | Eliminated | 41 | Farmers' Party | |
| Thomas Ryan | Waterford | Insurance agent | Dáil | 3,436 | Eliminated | 34 | Labour Party | |
| Michael Staines | Dublin | Wholesale merchant | Seanad | 2,028 | Eliminated | 29 | | |
| Frederick Summerfield | Dublin | Managing director | Seanad | 1,123 | Eliminated | 12 | | Motorists' lobby |
| Thomas Toal | Monaghan | Farmer | Dáil | 14,082 | Elected | 47 | (pro-CnaG) | |

== Legacy ==
The shortcomings of the 1925 election created a consensus that a single national constituency was unworkable. Political scientist Harold Foote Gosnell wrote of the election, "the ballot is a confusing one and the size of the constituency makes electioneering difficult."

In 1928, in the lead-up to the next triennial Seanad election, the Oireachtas formed a joint committee to change the selection procedures. While some members favoured retaining some form of voting by the general electorate, Fianna Fáil in particular wanted to ensure the Seanad was subordinate to the Dáil by restricting the franchise to Oireachtas members. This was effected by a constitutional amendment enacted on 23 July and an electoral act on 25 October. Thus, the 1925 election remains the only Seanad popular election.
