= Joseph Love =

Joseph Love may refer to:

- Joseph Clayton Love (died 1925), Irish politician
- Joseph Robert Love (1839–1914), Bahamian-born doctor, journalist and politician in Jamaica
