= John Horgan (academic) =

Irish politician and academic (born 1940)

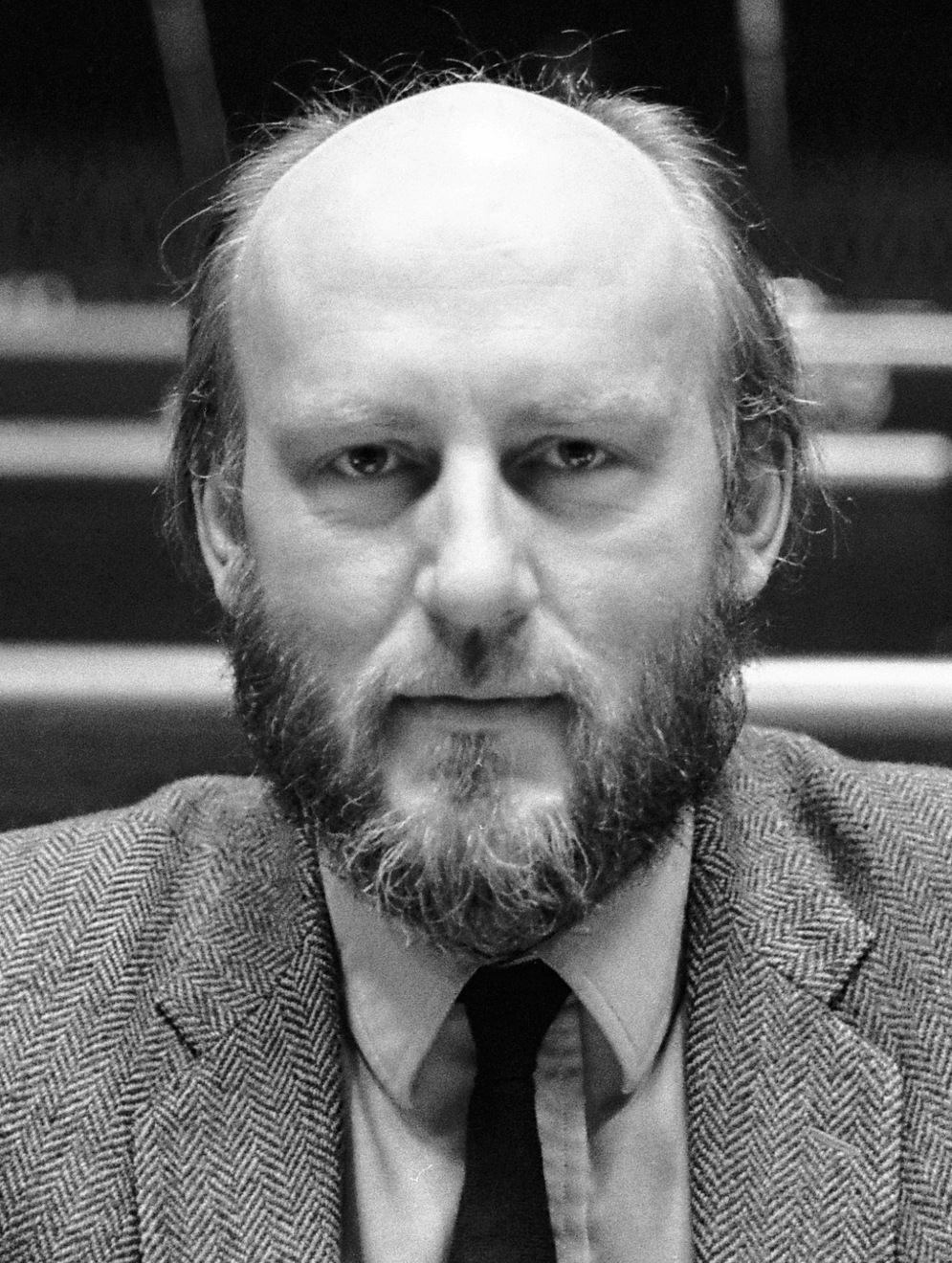
- Horgan in 1981

Member of the European Parliament
- In office 21 October 1981 – 2 March 1983
- Constituency: Dublin

Teachta Dála
- In office June 1977 – June 1981
- Constituency: Dublin County South

Senator
- In office 5 November 1969 – 16 June 1977
- Constituency: National University

Personal details
- Born: 26 October 1940 (age 85) Tralee, County Kerry, Ireland
- Party: Labour Party
- Spouse: Mary Jones
- Children: 5
- Relatives: John J. Horgan (grandfather)
- Education: University College Dublin; University College Cork

John S. Horgan (born 26 October 1940) is a former Labour Party politician, professor of journalism at Dublin City University and, from 2007 to 2014. the first Press Ombudsman in Ireland.

== Early life and family ==
Horgan is the grandson of John J. Horgan, a solicitor and politician associated with both the Irish Parliamentary Party and the Irish Volunteers. The son of doctors he was brought up in County Kerry, his mother Gwen (Jane) Richards was an English born Methodist whose father was also a doctor. He graduated in 1962 from University College Dublin. Horgan's Ph.D. thesis was supervised by Professor J. J. Lee and became the book Seán Lemass: The Enigmatic Patriot. Horgan is married to Mary Jones, their daughter Jane Horgan-Jones was a Dublin City Councilor for the Labour Party.

== Political career ==
Horgan began his career in 1962 as a journalist on the Evening Press. He later worked as a staff journalist on the Catholic Herald and The Irish Times, where he wrote about religion and education.

In 1969 Horgan was elected as a member of the 12th Seanad Éireann, representing the National University. He was re-elected in 1973, to the 13th Seanad. At the general election in 1977 he was elected to Dáil Éireann as a TD for Dublin County South. After boundary changes for the general election of 1981 he was not re-elected in the new constituency of Dublin South and he was also unsuccessful at the general election in February 1982. He did not stand again.

After John O'Connell resigned as one of the two Labour Party Members of the European Parliament (MEPs) for Dublin Horgan was appointed to replace him on 21 October 1981. He served in the European Parliament only until March 1983, when he resigned to take up an academic post.

== After politics ==
Horgan was appointed in 1983 as a lecturer in what was then the National Institute for Higher Education in Dublin. In 1989 it became Dublin City University (DCU) and he was appointed Professor of Journalism, a position he held until his retirement in 2006. He was also a member of the Interim Radio Commission, the Commission on the Newspaper Industry and the Forum on Broadcasting.

=== Press Ombudsman ===
In August 2007 the newly formed Press Council of Ireland appointed Horgan as Ireland's first-ever Press Ombudsman. The Press Council began operations on 11 January 2008. Its Code of Practice sets out the standards expected from newspapers and periodicals published in Ireland, and members of the public can raise complaints about articles that directly affect or involve them, and that may breach the Code. The Ombudsman's role is to mediate and, if necessary, adjudicate on cases where a complainant has not reached agreement with a publisher. More complex cases may be referred to the full Press Council.

The new system was launched partly to provide an alternatively to increasingly costly litigation and to head off the threat of a new privacy law. On 9 January 2008 the Minister for Justice, Brian Lenihan, announced that a proposed new privacy law would be postponed for two years to give the Press Ombudsman "an opportunity to establish himself and the credibility of his office".

On 28 March 2014, Horgan announced that he would step down as Press Ombudsman on 1 September 2014. Peter Feeney succeeded Horgan in the post.

== Published works ==
Books by Horgan include:

- Great Irish Reportage (editor). Dublin: Penguin Ireland. ISBN 978-1844883219
- Broadcasting and Public Life: RTÉ News and Current Affairs 1926–1997. Dublin: Four Courts Press, 2004. ISBN 1-85182-839-7
- Irish Media: A Critical History Since 1922, London: Routledge, 2001. ISBN 0415216400
- Noel Browne: Passionate Outsider, Dublin: Gill & Macmillan, 2000. ISBN 0717128091
- Seán Lemass: The Enigmatic Patriot, Dublin: Gill & Macmillan, 1997. ISBN 0717120791
- Mary Robinson: An Independent Voice, Dublin: O'Brien Press, 1997. ISBN 978-0-86278-540-6
- Labour: The Price of Power, Dublin: Gill & Macmillan, 1986. ISBN 0717114422
- Humanae Vitae and the Bishops: The Encyclical and the Statements of the National Hierarchies, Shannon: Irish University Press, 1972. ISBN 071650328X
- The Church Among the People, Ohio: Pflaum Press, 1969. OCLC 3135844
- The Last Revolution: The Destiny of Over- and Under-Developed Nations, (translator) by Louis-Joseph Lebret, Dublin: Gill & Son, 1965. OCLC 1430125

| Dáil | Election | Deputy (Party) | Deputy (Party) | Deputy (Party) |
|---|---|---|---|---|
| 19th | 1969 | Kevin Boland (FF) | Tom O'Higgins (FG) | Richard Burke (FG) |
| 19th | 1970 by-election | Larry McMahon (FG) | Tom O'Higgins (FG) | Richard Burke (FG) |
| 20th | 1973 | Larry McMahon (FG) | Ruairí Brugha (FF) | Richard Burke (FG) |
| 21st | 1977 | John Kelly (FG) | Niall Andrews (FF) | John Horgan (Lab) |
| 22nd | 1981 | Constituency abolished. See Dublin South | | |
