= Benjamin Haughton =

Benjamin Haughton may refer to:

- Benjamin Haughton (politician) (1855–1932), Irish businessman and politician
- Benjamin Haughton (artist) (1865–1924), English landscape painter
