= Simon Maddock =

Irish businessman and civic figure

Sir Simon William Maddock (died 1927) was an Irish businessman and civic figure in Dublin.

== Biography ==
Maddock was a member of the Dublin County Council, a governor of the Meath Hospital, the National Children's Hospital Ireland and the Royal Hibernian Military School. He was a director of Johnston, Mooney & O'Brien, Ltd and of James H. Webb & Co, Ltd. Maddock was a deputy lieutenant and justice of the peace for the City of Dublin. He was knighted in the 1922 New Year Honours "for public services". Following the establishing of the Irish Free State on 6 December 1922, he contested the 1922 Seanad election but was not elected. He also contested the 1925 Seanad election as a business candidate; he secured 3,876 votes and was eliminated. Maddock was a member of the Royal Dublin Society. He died in December 1927.
