= Edward MacEvoy =

Irish politician (1873–1926)

Senator
- In office 11 December 1922 – 12 December 1928

Personal details
- Born: 22 April 1873 County Laois, Ireland
- Died: 1926 (aged 52–53)
- Party: Cumann na nGaedheal

Edward MacEvoy (22 April 1873 – 1926) was an Irish politician. A wholesale merchant, from County Laois, he was a Cumann na nGaedheal member of Seanad Éireann from 1922 to 1925. He was defeated at the 1925 Seanad election.
