= Macardle Moore Brewery =

MacArdle Moore Brewery was a brewery in Dundalk, Ireland, formed in 1850 from the merger of two older breweries, McAllisters and Wynnes. Over the years it was to become almost synonymous with brewing in Dundalk. It joined the Guinness empire in the late 1960s.

It gave its name to MacArdle's Traditional Ale, an Irish red ale, which is still produced by Diageo, at their St. James's Gate facility in Dublin.

It was announced in 2000 that the brewery and a packing facility on the site were to be closed.

Brewing resumed on the site by the beverages division of Alltech in 2018, with the move of their brewing from Newry

== See also ==
- Thomas Macardle
- Dorothy Macardle
