= William Cummins (Irish politician) =

Irish politician (1874–1943)

Senator
- In office 7 September 1938 – 27 July 1943
- Constituency: Labour Panel

Senator
- In office 21 February 1923 – 29 May 1936

Personal details
- Born: 1874
- Died: 27 July 1943 (aged 68–69)
- Party: Labour Party

William Cummins (1874 – 27 July 1943) was an Irish Labour Party politician.

== Biography ==
A national school teacher by profession, he was first elected to the Free State Seanad at a by-election on 21 February 1923 to fill the vacancy caused by the resignation of Eamonn Mansfield.

He was re-elected for a 12-year term at the 1925 Seanad election and served until the Free State Seanad was abolished in 1936. He was elected to the 3rd Seanad Éireann in 1938 by the Labour Panel.
