= William Molloy (Irish politician) =

Irish politician (1884–1965)

Senator
- In office 11 December 1922 – 9 December 1931

Personal details
- Born: 1884 County Mayo, Ireland
- Died: 1965 (aged 80–81)
- Party: Independent

William John Molloy (1884–1965) was an Irish politician. He was an independent member of Seanad Éireann from 1922 to 1931. He was elected at the 1922 Seanad election for a term of 9 years, and lost his seat in the 1931 Seanad election.

Molloy left the U.S. in 1920, and lived in Carrowroe Park in Roscommon.

He was the father of Niall Molloy, who was murdered in Clara, County Offaly in July 1985.
