= Thomas Macardle =

Irish brewer and businessman

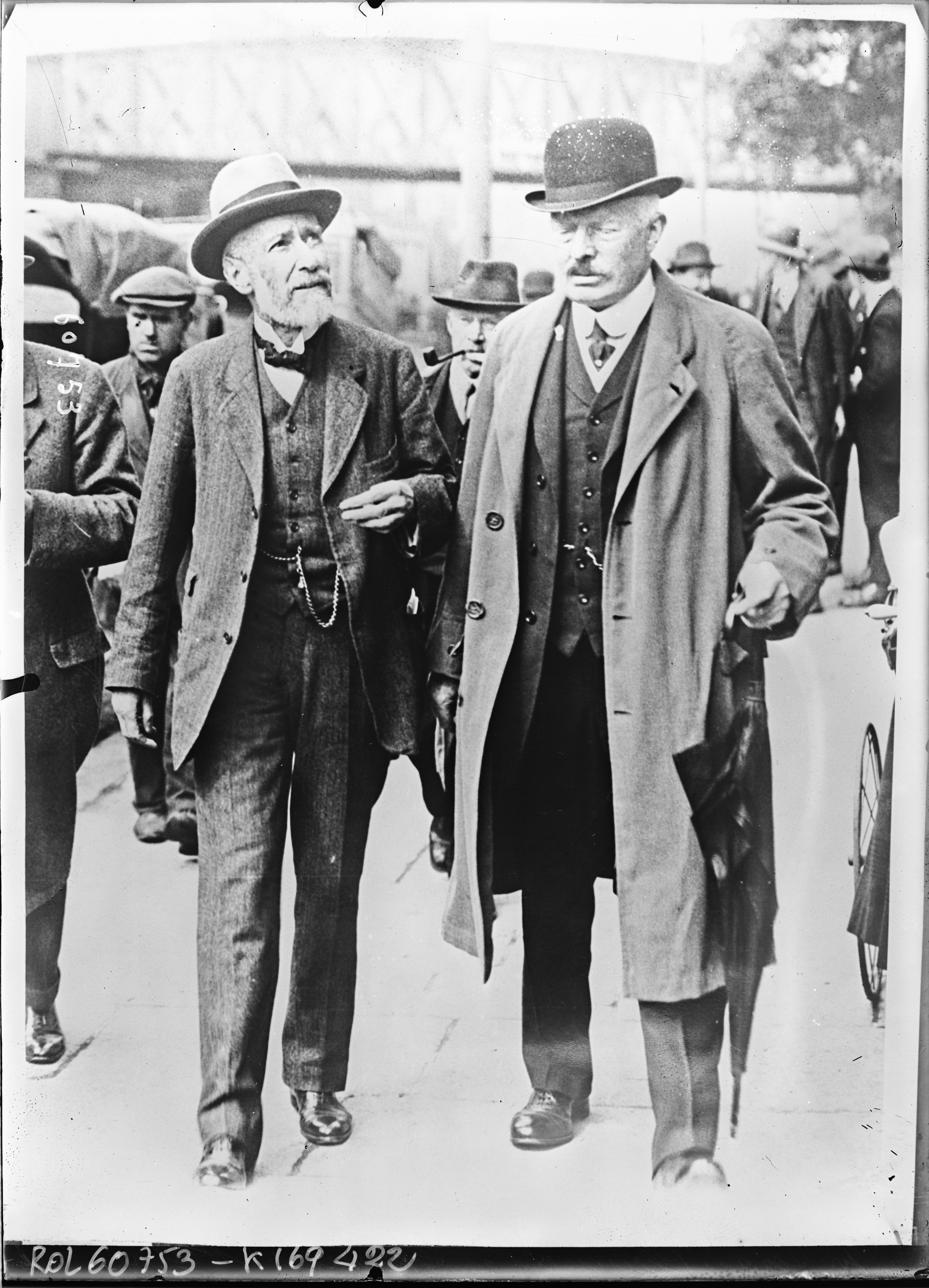
Sir Thomas Macardle (right) entering the 1920 Irish Peace Conference in Dublin alongside Sir Horace Plunkett

Sir Thomas Callan Macardle KBE (1856–1925) was an Irish brewer and businessman who ran the Macardle Moore Brewery.

== Biography ==
Macardle was the son of Edward Henry Macardle and Margaret, née Callan. He was born into a prominent Roman Catholic family in Dundalk, County Louth. He was educated at St Mary's College, Dundalk, before spending time in England with his cousin's family.

He took over running the Macardle Moore Brewery shortly before his father's death. In addition to brewing, Macardle was a director of several other businesses, including Eagle Star Insurance and the Dundalk and Newry Steampacket company. He was also a significant civic figure in County Louth; he was a justice of the peace and deputy lieutenant for the county and served as High Sheriff of Louth in 1917.

Under Macardle's ownership, the brewery demonstrated strong family and business support for the British war effort in the First World War; the firm's letterhead described it "Irish Army Brewers, Contractors to HM Forces". He supported Irish enlistment into the British armed forces, serving as Chairman of the Louth Recruiting Committee, and arranged the supply of grain to the military. His son, Kenneth, was killed while serving in the British Army in 1916.

Macardle was honoured in the 1920 New Year Honours when he was created a Knight Commander of the Order of the British Empire. On 24 August 1920, he was a delegate at the Irish Peace Conference in Dublin, which brought together moderate political figures to seek a negotiated settlement to the escalating Irish War of Independence.

Following the establishment of the Irish Free State on 6 December 1922, he contested the 1922 Seanad election but was not elected.

Macardle married Minnie Lucy Ross on 24 April 1888 in the Church of the Holy Family, Dublin; together they had five children, including Dorothy Macardle.
