= Samuel Lombard Brown =

Irish politician and barrister (1856–1939

Senator
- In office 10 February 1926 – 29 May 1936
- In office 12 December 1923 – 17 September 1925

Personal details
- Born: 10 January 1856 County Meath, Ireland
- Died: 14 December 1939 (aged 83) Dublin, Ireland
- Party: Independent
- Education: University College Cork; King's Inns

Samuel Lombard Brown (10 January 1856 – 14 December 1939) was an Irish politician and barrister.

He studied at University College Cork (UCC), graduating MA, and at King's Inns. He also attended lectures in feudal and English law at Trinity College Dublin (TCD) from 1876 to 1877. He was Barrington lecturer in political economy at UCC from 1879 to 1883, and was called to the bar in 1881. In 1905 he was elected a bencher of the King's Inns and a member of the bar council. The acknowledged leader of the bar, he appeared in many of the important chancery cases of his day. He was to the fore of the campaign in 1915 to secure the Hugh Lane bequest for Dublin. He retired from practice in 1926.

He was an independent member of Seanad Éireann from 1923 to 1925 and from 1926 to 1936. He was elected at a by-election on 12 December 1923, replacing Horace Plunkett, but lost his seat at the 1925 Seanad election. He was re-elected at a by-election on 10 February 1926, replacing Windham Wyndham-Quin. He was re-elected at the 1934 Seanad election and served until the Free State Seanad was abolished in 1936.

A member of the largely ex-unionist independent group in the Seanad, Brown was a supporter of Cumann na nGaedheal and raised funds for the party. As president of the Irish Society for the Protection of Birds, he introduced a bill for the protection of wild birds in 1927. Although initially rejected by the Dáil, it was passed two years later in a considerably enlarged form.

Brown accepted appointment as regius professor of laws (1934–1939) at TCD. He never married, and died on 14 December 1939 at his home, in Merrion Square, Dublin.
