= John O'Neill (Irish senator) =

Irish politician (died 1941)

Senator
- In office 30 March 1925 – 17 September 1925

Personal details
- Born: County Wicklow, Ireland
- Died: c. 1 December 1941
- Party: Cumann na nGaedheal

John O'Neill (died c. 1 December 1941) was an Irish businessman who was an Irish Free State senator in 1925. He was formally independent, but took a pro-Cumann na nGaedheal line. In 1925 he was living in Delgany, County Wicklow, and described himself as a "cycle manufacturer and motor trader". He owned O'Neill Motors, a Dublin garage acquired in 1959 by Ryan's Car Hire.

O'Neill served on several committees and commissions on industry and commerce. During World War I he chaired the All-Ireland Munitions and Government Supplies Committee, which tried with limited success to secure war-related contracts for Irish firms. He served on Lord Balfour of Burleigh's 1916–1917 Committee on Commercial and Industrial Policy, dissenting from its final report in particular due to Ireland-specific issues. He chaired the First Dáil's Commission of Inquiry into the Resources and Industries of Ireland, and served on the Economic Relations Committee established in 1921 by Robert Barton, the Dáil's Minister for Economic Affairs, to advise on the economic aspects of the negotiations for the Anglo-Irish Treaty. After independence, he advocated protectionism, and served on a 1923 committee planning the takeover of the dockyard at Haulbowline. In 1931 he was one of three members of the advisory committee under the Trade Loans (Guarantee) Act, 1931. He was on the 1934–1938 Banking Commission which led to the creation of the Central Bank of Ireland, attending 94 of its 150 meetings and subscribing to the majority report.

O'Neill was elected to the Seanad at a by-election on 30 March 1925 to fill the vacancy created by the death of George Sigerson, finishing one vote ahead of Patrick McCartan. That September, he was defeated in the 1925 Seanad election. He stood unsuccessfully in the 1927 by-election to fill the vacancy created by the death of Stephen O'Mara, finishing fifth behind P. J. Brady.
