= Michael Fanning =

Michael or Mike Fanning may refer to:

== Sports ==
- Mike Fanning (American football) (1953–2022), American football player
- Michael Fanning (Gaelic footballer), Irish Gaelic footballer
- Mick Fanning (born 1981), Australian surfer

== Others ==
- Michael Fanning (politician) (c. 1865 – 1950), Irish politician
- Mike Fanning (politician) (born 1967), American politician
