= Eamonn Mansfield =

Irish schoolteacher and public servant (1878–1954)

Senator
- In office 11 December 1922 – 12 December 1922

Personal details
- Born: 1878 County Tipperary, Ireland
- Died: 1954 (aged 75–76) County Tipperary, Ireland
- Party: Independent

Eamonn (or Eamon; also Edward) Mansfield (1878–1954) was an Irish schoolteacher and public servant, and briefly a member of the Free State Seanad.

Mansfield's father was a tenant farmer who was evicted. The son became principal of the national school in Cullen, County Tipperary, where his wife was also a teacher. He was president of the Irish National Teachers' Organisation (INTO) from 1910 to 1911, and later its first full-time general secretary. He was dismissed as principal in October 1912 after his 1911 INTO president's address criticised W. H. Welpy, a school inspector who was reputed to give poor assessments to keep salaries down. Thomas O'Donnell and other Irish Parliamentary Party MPs campaigned for his reinstatement; Mansfield and his wife continued to teach without pay until this was achieved in 1915. He was later Chairman of the Wages Board c. 1921.

On 7 December 1922, the day after the Irish Free State came into existence, the members of the 3rd Dáil (TDs) voted to choose 30 members of the newly created Seanad. With Labour Party support, Mansfield was elected in 23rd place, thereby securing a three-year term to expire at the 1925 election. The Irish Civil War was in progress, and the same day, two pro-Treaty TDs were shot, one fatally. The following day, four imprisoned anti-Treaty leaders were executed in reprisal. On 12 December, Mansfield sent a telegram resigning from the Seanad "on account of Friday's reprisal" and stating that "peace is Ireland's only hope". Ernest Blythe suggested later that Mansfield had resigned in panic at anti-Treaty commander Liam Lynch's order to assassinate all Senators.

Mansfield was later a member of the Commission of Agriculture, and was consulted in the drafting of the Land Acts of 1923 and 1933. In 1935, he was a member of a commission of inquiry into the sale of cottages and plots to agricultural labourers, as representative of the Cottier Tenants' and Rural Workers' Association. He was a lay commissioner on the Appeals Tribunal of the Irish Land Commission from 1934 to 1950. When Kathleen Browne complained in the Seanad about his appointment, his expertise and impartiality were commended by minister Joseph Connolly and senators Michael Comyn, James Charles Dowdall, and William Cummins. As commissioner, he was an influential advocate of land division, and the rights of evicted tenants.

Trade union offices
| Preceded by Michael Doyle | General Secretary of the Irish National Teachers' Organisation; 1913–1916 | Succeeded by Thomas J. O'Connell |
