= Sir William Goulding, 1st Baronet =

Irish businessman and politician (1856–1925)

Sir William Joshua Goulding, 1st Baronet (7 March 1856 – 12 July 1925) was an Anglo-Irish business magnate, Irish unionist politician and rugby player. He was a member of the short-lived Senate of Southern Ireland.

== Early life and family ==
Goulding was born in Cork, the son of William Goulding, Conservative Member of Parliament for Cork City, and his second wife Maria Heath Manders. He was educated in Cork before attending St John's College, Cambridge, graduating with a masters in 1883. In 1875 Goulding's father employed John Pentland Mahaffy to take his son on a Grand Tour to Italy and Greece, for part of which they travelled with Oscar Wilde. His younger brother, Edward Goulding, was raised to the peerage as Baron Wargrave in 1922.

In 1881 he married Ada Stokes, daughter of Charles Lingard Stokes of Pauntley, Worcester. He had property in Dublin and County Kildare.

== Business career ==
After graduating Goulding returned to Ireland and joined the family fertilizer and phosphates firm, W. & H. M. Goulding. He became chairman of the company on his father's death in 1884 and moved the company headquarters from Cork to Dublin in 1885. He made several acquisitions of other Irish fertilizer businesses, and by 1902 the company's annual production was 119,337 tons.

In 1907, Goulding became chairman of the Great Southern and Western Railway. He was chairman of the Irish railway committee from 1806 to 1909. After the Irish Free State government's amalgamation of southern Irish railway companies, Goulding was appointed chairman of the newly organised board. He was a director of the Irish National Bank Ltd. Goulding was on the council of the Dublin Chamber of Commerce.

== Political activity ==
Like his father, Goulding was an active Irish unionist, but despite two requests he never stood in a Parliamentary election. He was a member of the Irish Unionist Alliance (IUA) and served as chairman of the city of Dublin and south county Dublin Unionist Representative Associations. On 22 August 1904 he was created a baronet, of Millicent and Roebuck Hill in the Baronetage of the United Kingdom. Goulding was Sheriff of County Dublin in 1900 and High Sheriff of Kildare in 1907. He was chairman of the Property Losses (Ireland) Committee from 1916 to 1917. He was made a member of the Privy Council of Ireland in the 1917 Birthday Honours, and was subsequently appointed by the British government to join the Irish Convention of 1917–1918. Following the split of the IUA in 1919, Goulding joined the Unionist Anti-Partition League. In March 1921 he led a deputation of southern unionists formed to persuade Roman Catholic bishops to act as intermediaries between Sinn Féin and the British government. That month he also founded the Irish Businessmen's Conciliation Committee alongside Andrew Jameson, which aimed to galvanise the support of businesses against the partition of Ireland.

In 1921, Goulding was nominated to be an inaugural member of the short-lived Senate of Southern Ireland. He took the oath of office, but did not attend either of the Senate's two meetings. On 12 May 1922 he participated in a Church of Ireland deputation with Archbishop John Gregg and Bishop Robert Miller to W. T. Cosgrave and Michael Collins to ensure the rights Irish Protestants were secure in the Irish Free State. Following the establishing of the Irish Free State on 6 December 1922, he contested the 1922 Seanad election but was not elected.

== Irish Rugby Football Union ==
Goulding played rugby for Ireland, gaining an international cap against Scotland in 1879. He was the fourth president of the Irish Rugby Football Union from 1880 to 1881, and also served as the organisation's vice-president, honorary secretary and honorary treasurer.

Baronetage of the United Kingdom
New creation	Baronet (of Millicent and Roebuck Hill); 1904–1925	Succeeded by William Goulding
