= Harold Foote Gosnell =

American political scientist and author (1896-1997)

Harold Foote Gosnell (December 24, 1896 – January 8, 1997) was an American political scientist and writer, known for his research and writings on American politics, elections, and political parties.

Gosnell attended the University of Rochester, graduating summa cum laude in 1918. He went on to the University of Chicago, where in 1922 he received his doctorate. He became a professor at Chicago and taught there until 1941. During World War II, he went to Washington, D.C., as a budget analyst and later as an operations officer for the United States Department of State, while he continued to study and write on politics. He served in the federal government until 1960, and was on the faculty at American University. From 1962 to 1972, he was a professor of political science at Howard University.

A student of political scientist Charles Edward Merriam, Gosnell published work in the 1920s that pioneered new approaches using psychology to examine voting and political behavior. His dissertation on New York politics, Thomas C. Platt ("Boss" Platt) and Theodore Roosevelt was published, and then Non-voting, Causes and Methods of Control (1924, with Merriam) and Getting out the Vote: An Experiment in the Stimulation of Voting (1927). In 1936, Gosnell won the first Anisfield-Wolf Book Award for Negro Politicians: Rise of Negro Politics in Chicago. In the 1930s, he also wrote about machine politics in Chicago, and then in the 1960s revised his work in this area. During the Cold War, Gosnell studied the Soviet Union.

== Gosnell Prize for Excellence in Political Methodology ==
Each year in honor of Gosnell's work, the Society for Political Methodology awards the Gosnell Prize for Excellence in Political Methodology. The prize is given to the author(s) of the best work in political methodology, which has been presented at the political science conferences during the preceding year.

== Works ==
- Boss Platt and His New York Machine: A Study of the Political Leadership of Thomas C. Platt, Theodore Roosevelt, and Others (University of Chicago Press, 1924; repr. 1969).
- Getting out the vote: an experiment in the stimulation of voting. (University of Chicago Press, 1927)
- Machine Politics: Chicago Model (University of Chicago Press, 1937; 2d ed. 1969).
- Negro Politicians: The Rise of Negro Politics in Chicago (University of Chicago Press, 1935; 2d ed. 1968).
- Champion Campaigner: Franklin D. Roosevelt (Macmillan, 1952).
- Truman's Crises: A Political Biography of Harry S. Truman (Praeger, 1980).
