= Benjamin Haughton (politician) =

Irish businessman and politician (1855–1932)

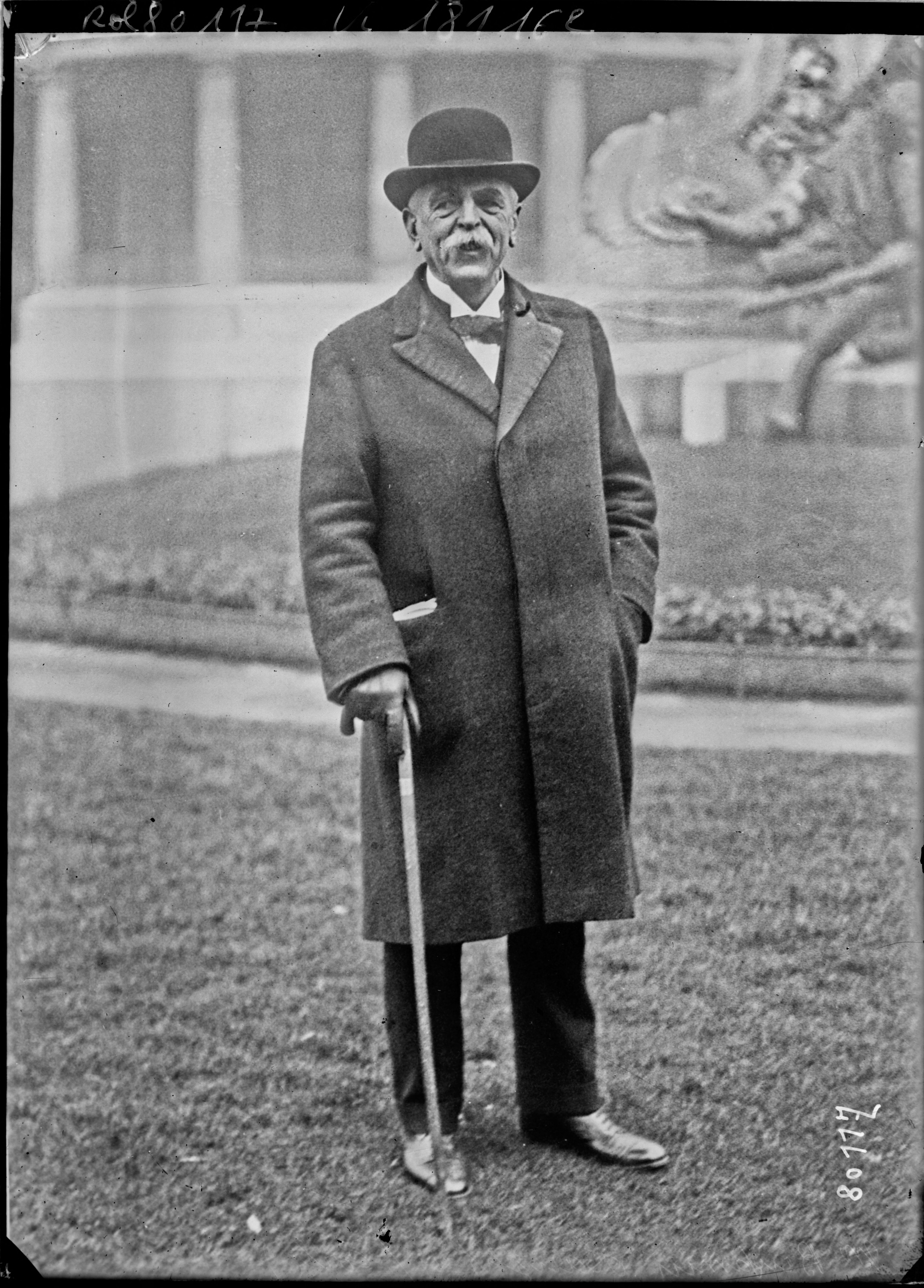
- Haughton in 1922

Senator
- In office 11 December 1922 – 12 December 1928

Personal details
- Born: 1855 Cork, Ireland
- Died: 1932 (aged 76–77) Cork, Ireland
- Party: Independent
- Spouse: Margaret Goodbody
- Children: 5

Benjamin Haughton (1855–1932) was an Irish businessman from Cork city, who was an independent member of Seanad Éireann from 1922 to 1928. He was from the Cork branch of a Quaker family whose Carlow branch included social reformer James Haughton and scientist Samuel Haughton. Benjamin was head of Haughton's timber and iron merchants in Cork and a supporter of the local YMCA.

During the Irish War of Independence he was involved with the Irish White Cross and among a group of liberal Southern unionists who sought conciliation with Sinn Féin in Cork in the lead-up to the 1921 truce. Upon the coming into force of the Constitution of the Irish Free State in 1922, W. T. Cosgrave as the President of the Executive Council nominated 30 of the initial 60 senators, including Haughton. These were subsequently divided by lottery into two cohorts of 15, serving terms of six and twelve years respectively, with Haughton drawing a six-year term. He lost his seat at the 1928 Seanad election.

He and his wife Margaret Elizabeth Goodbody had five children.
