= John MacLoughlin =

Irish politician (1871–1943)

Senator
- In office 27 April 1938 – 8 September 1943
- Constituency: Industrial and Commercial Panel

Senator
- In office 11 December 1922 – 29 May 1936

Personal details
- Born: 8 September 1871 Buncrana, County Donegal, Ireland
- Died: 11 September 1943 (aged 72)
- Party: Independent; Cumann na nGaedheal; Fine Gael
- Education: University College Dublin

John MacLoughlin (8 September 1871 – 11 September 1943) was an Irish politician. Born in Buncrana, County Donegal to a nationalist, middle-class business family, MacLoughlin was educated at St Columb's College, Derry and University College Dublin. His business interests included media publishing.

He was a member of the Free State Seanad Éireann from 1922 to 1936. He was first elected at the 1922 Seanad election as an independent candidate. He joined Cumann na nGaedheal in 1931. He was elected to the 2nd Seanad in 1938 on the Industrial and Commercial Panel as a Fine Gael member. He was re-elected to the 3rd Seanad and served until he lost his seat at the 1943 Seanad election.
