= Cornelius Irwin =

Irish politician (1876–1955)

Senator
- In office 11 December 1922 – 17 September 1925

Personal details
- Born: 6 June 1876 Galway, Ireland
- Died: 22 April 1955 (aged 78) County Wexford, Ireland
- Party: Cumann na nGaedheal

Cornelius Joseph Irwin (6 June 1876 – 22 April 1955) was an Irish politician. He was a Cumann na nGaedheal member of Seanad Éireann from 1922 to 1925. He was defeated at the 1925 Seanad election.

Irwin was born in Galway in 1876, and moved to Enniscorthy, County Wexford, in the 1890s. He was one of the founders of the Enniscorthy Echo in 1902 and was managing director until his death. Identified with Conradh na Gaeilge and Sinn Féin he was interned in Stafford Prison and Frongoch internment camp after the Easter Rising.

A farmer and a ship owner he died at his home, Kilcannon House, Enniscorthy, on 22 April 1955, aged 78.
