= Michael O'Dea (Irish politician) =

Irish politician (died 1932)

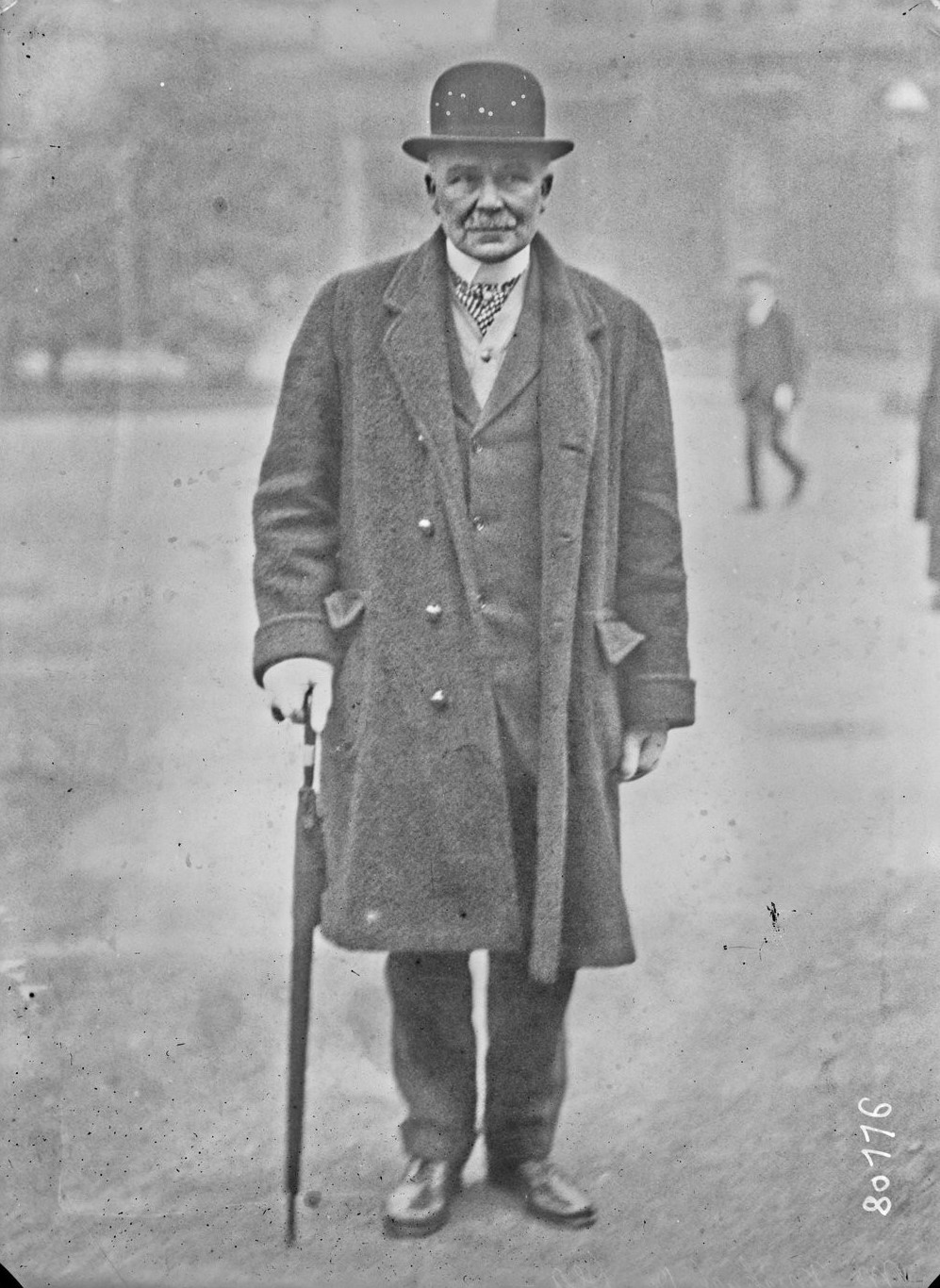
- O'Dea in 1922

Senator
- In office 11 December 1922 – 17 September 1925

Personal details
- Died: 25 September 1932
- Party: Cumann na nGaedheal

Michael O'Dea (died 25 September 1932) was an Irish politician. He was a Cumann na nGaedheal member of Seanad Éireann from 1922 to 1925. He was defeated at the 1925 Seanad election.

A bedding and furniture manufacturer, O'Dea was an active member of the Council of Dublin Industrial Development Association and the Council of the Dublin Chamber of Commerce. He was also a member of the Railway and Canal Commission.
