= Thomas Linehan =

Irish politician (1859–1938)

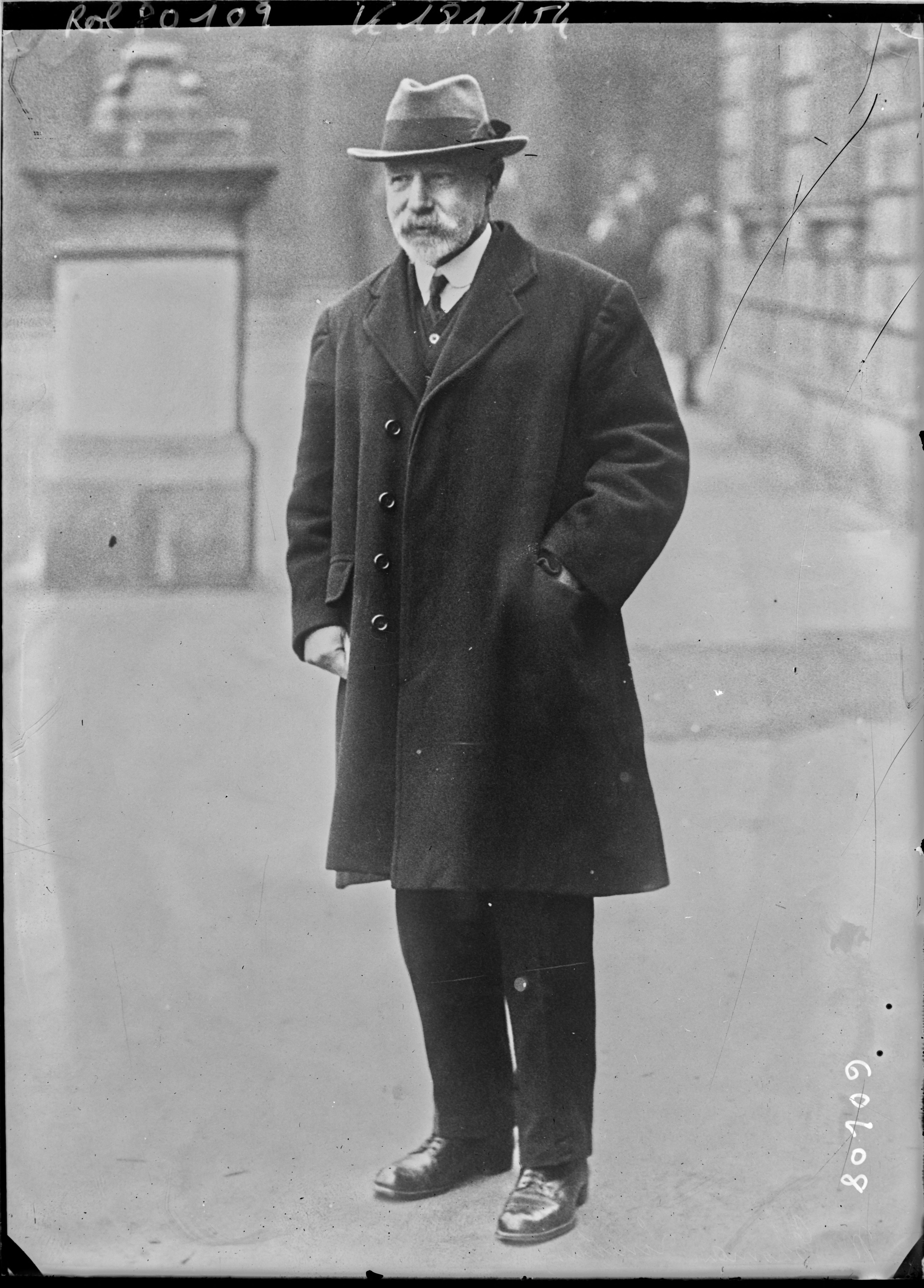
- Linehan in 1922

Senator
- In office 11 December 1922 – 29 May 1936

Personal details
- Born: c. 1859 County Cork, Ireland
- Died: 15 October 1938 (aged 78–79) County Cork, Ireland
- Party: Independent (1928–1936)
- Other political affiliations: Farmers' Party (1922–1928)

Thomas Linehan (c. 1859 – 15 October 1938) was an Irish politician. He was a member of Seanad Éireann from 1922 to 1936. He was first elected to the Seanad in 1922 as a Farmers' Party candidate. He was re-elected at the 1925 Seanad election for 12 years and served until the Free State Seanad was abolished in 1936. He was an independent member from 1928 onwards.

Linehan was born in County Cork and farmed for many years at Ballinvarrig House, Whitechurch, County Cork, where he died on 15 October 1938, aged 79. He was the first secretary of the Irish National Land League in the county, vice-chairman of Cork County Council and a president and trustee of the Irish Farmers' Union.

He had a son, William Linehan, who became a colonial administrator of Malaya.
