= William Barrington (Irish politician) =

Irish politician (1857–1937)

Senator
- In office 11 December 1922 – 9 December 1931

Personal details
- Born: 1857 County Limerick, Ireland
- Died: 1937 (aged 79–80)
- Party: Independent

William Barrington (1857–1937) was an Irish politician. He was an independent member of Seanad Éireann from 1922 to 1931. He was elected at the 1922 Seanad election and served until he lost his seat at the 1931 Seanad election.
