= Oireachtas (Irish Free State) =

Legislature of the Irish Free State

Coordinates: 53°20′30″N 6°15′17″W

Oireachtas of the Irish Free State Oireachtas Shaorstát Éireann
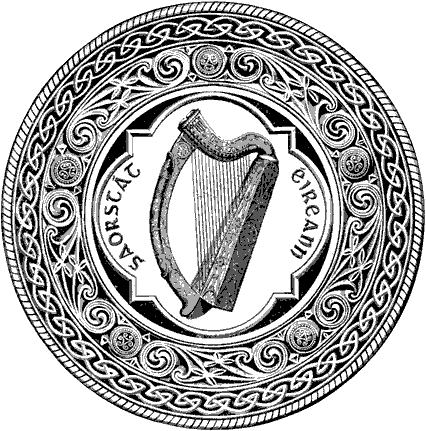
- Great Seal of the Irish Free State

Type
- Type: Bicameral (1922–1936); Unicameral (1936–1937)
- Houses: Dáil Éireann; Seanad Éireann (1922–1936)

History
- Established: 1922
- Disbanded: 1937
- Preceded by: Dáil Éireann
- Succeeded by: Oireachtas Éireann
- Seats: 188–213; 60 Senators; 128–153 Teachtaí Dála (TDs)

Elections
- Dáil voting system: STV
- Seanad voting system: Appointment by the Dáil and President of the Executive Council; Direct election (1925); Election by members of Dáil and Seanad
- Last Dáil election: 1937 general election

Meeting place
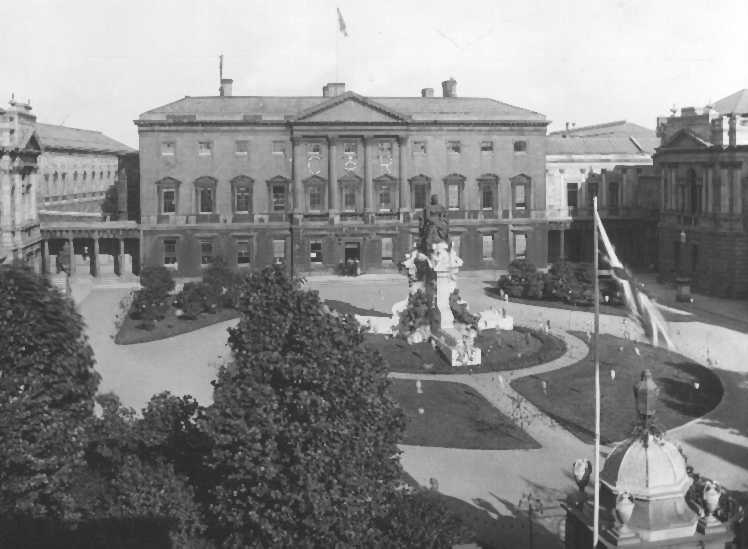
- Leinster House, Dublin

The Oireachtas of the Irish Free State (Irish: Oireachtas Shaorstát Éireann) was the legislature of the Irish Free State from 1922 until 1937. It was established by the 1922 Constitution of Ireland which was based from the Anglo-Irish Treaty. It was the first internationally recognised independent Irish Parliament since the historic Parliament of Ireland which was abolished with the Acts of Union 1800.

The Parliament was bicameral, consisting of Dáil Éireann (the lower house, also known as the Dáil) with 153 seats and Seanad Éireann (the upper house; also known as the Seanad) with 60 seats). The Seanad was abolished on 29 May 1936, and from then until its abolition the Oireachtas was unicameral. The King, who was officially represented by the Governor-General, was also a constituent part of the Oireachtas. The Oireachtas of the Irish Free State was disbanded by the 1937 Constitution of Ireland which created the modern Oireachtas.

Like the modern Oireachtas, the Free State legislature was dominated by the directly elected Dáil. Unlike the modern body, the Free State Oireachtas had de facto authority to amend the constitution as it saw fit, without recourse to a referendum. During the Free State it was also the Oireachtas as a whole, rather than the Dáil, that had authority to commit the state to war, although this distinction was not significant in practice.

== History ==
The earliest parliament in Ireland was the Parliament of Ireland, which was founded in the thirteenth century as the supreme legislative body of the lordship of Ireland and was in existence until 1801. This parliament governed the English-dominated part of Ireland, which at first was limited to Dublin and surrounding cities, but later grew to include the entire island. But the Parliament of Ireland was, from the passage of Poynings' Law (1494) until its repeal in 1782, subordinate to the Parliament of England, and later Parliament of Great Britain. This Parliament consisted of the King of Ireland, who was the same person as the King of England, a House of the Lords and a House of Commons. Under the Act of Union 1800 the separate Kingdoms of Ireland and Great Britain were merged on 1 January 1801, to form the United Kingdom of Great Britain and Ireland and the Parliament of the United Kingdom. Throughout the 19th century Irish opposition to the Union was strong, occasionally erupting in violent insurrection.

The next legislature to exist in Ireland only came into being in 1919. This was an extra-legal, unicameral parliament established by Irish republicans, known simply as Dáil Éireann and thus existed outside of British law. The Dáil was notionally a legislature for the whole island of Ireland. The First Dáil and the Second Dáil did not therefore have any recognised legal authority outside Ireland. The 3rd Dáil was elected under the terms of the Anglo-Irish Treaty as a constituent assembly to approve the Constitution of the Irish Free State and pave the way for the creation of the new state. Once the Constitution of the Irish Free State was in effect the 3rd Dáil served as the lower house of the Oireachtas. Under the terms of the constitution, however, the 3rd Dáil merely carried out the functions of the Dáil during this period until a new chamber could be elected. The First Dáil of the Irish Free State was therefore officially the 4th Dáil, which was elected in 1923.

In 1920, in parallel to the extra-legal Dáil, the British Government created the Parliament of Southern Ireland, a Home Rule legislature during the Irish War of Independence under the Fourth Home Rule Bill. It was designed to legislate for Southern Ireland, a political entity which was created by the British Government to solve the issue of rising Irish nationalism and the issue of partitionism, whilst retaining Ireland as part of the United Kingdom. It was made up of the King, the House of Commons of Southern Ireland and the Senate of Southern Ireland. The Parliament of Southern Ireland was formally abolished in 1922 by the Irish Free State (Agreement) Act 1922, as per the Anglo-Irish Treaty which was the basis of the Constitution of the Irish Free State which established the Oireachtas.

== Powers ==
Under the constitution the Oireachtas had exclusive authority to:

- Legislate, including approving the budget.
- Create subordinate legislatures.
- Amend the Constitution.
- Permit the state to participate in a war.
- Raise and control armed forces.

There were however also a number of limitations to the Oireachtas power:

- Laws or constitutional amendments were invalid if they violated the Anglo-Irish Treaty.
- It could not retrospectively criminalise acts that were not illegal at the time they were committed.
- Until the 1931 Statute of Westminster, the British Parliament retained the power, in theory, to legislate for the Irish Free State without its consent.
- The Oireachtas could only legislate for the Irish Free State (defined as the area which had previously been known as Southern Ireland), and not for Northern Ireland.

=== 1936–1937 ===
A series of constitutional amendments in 1936 substantially altered the functioning of the Oireachtas:

- The King ceased to be a part of the Oireachtas, and the responsibility for signing bills into law became a formality exercised by the Ceann Comhairle.
- The Seanad was abolished so the Irish Free State Oireachtas consisted solely of the Dáil.
- The original oath was abolished.
- The requirement for laws and constitutional amendments to comply with the Anglo-Irish Treaty was removed.
- The power to dissolve the legislature was exercised by the Ceann Comhairle when instructed to do so by the President of the Executive Council.

== Dáil Éireann ==
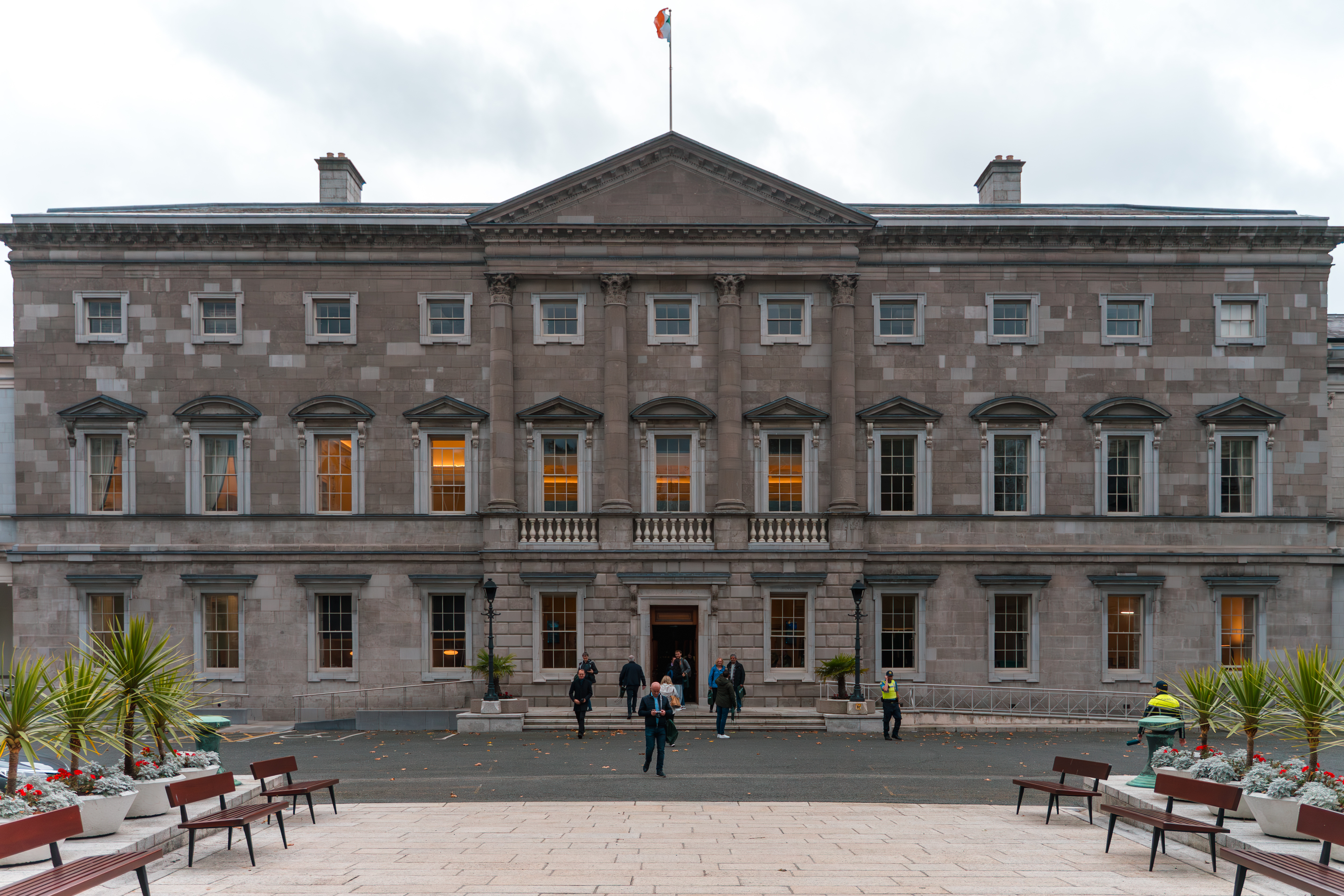
Leinster House, the parliament house of the Free State.

Dáil Éireann from 1922 to 1936 served as the directly elected lower house of the Oireachtas of the Irish Free State, and from 1936 to 1937 the sole chamber. The Constitution of the Irish Free State described the role of the house as one of a "Chamber of Deputies". It sat in Leinster House. Like the modern Dáil, the Dáil was the dominant component of the legislature; and effectively had authority to enact almost any law it chose, and to appoint and dismiss the President of the Executive Council. Under the terms of the 1937 Constitution of Ireland, the Dáil of the Irish Free State became the modern Dáil Éireann.

=== Composition and elections ===
Under the Constitution of the Irish Free State membership of the Dáil was open to all citizens who had reached the age of twenty-one. However those who were legally disqualified or who were members of the Seanad were excluded. For most of the period of the Irish Free State the constitution also contained a controversial requirement that all members of the Oireachtas swear an oath of fidelity to the King, as well as an Oath of Allegiance to the constitution of the Free State. The oath was, however, abolished by a constitutional amendment in 1936.

The Dáil was elected on the basis of universal adult suffrage by "proportional representation" and the single transferable vote. The franchise was restricted to those over twenty-one. As adopted, the constitution required that term of a Dáil would last for four years, unless the law specified a shorter period or the house was dissolved early. However, after changes to the constitution and the law in 1927, the constitutional maximum became six years, and the legal maximum five.

While every Irish Government since 1937 has restricted Dáil constituencies to a maximum of five seats, during the Irish Free State there were several six-, seven- and eight-seat constituencies. During the Irish Free State Galway was a single nine-seat constituency. As well as geographical constituencies, there were two university constituencies: Dublin University and the National University. The franchise for the university constituencies was open to all those who had been awarded degrees from either institution. However anyone voting in a university constituency was excluded from voting in their geographical district. The constitution required that each return three TDs, regardless of population. Because these constituencies had much lower populations that the ordinary geographical constituencies this resulted in malapportionment. The university constituencies were abolished in 1936 under the Constitution (Amendment No. 23) Act 1936 and the Electoral (University Constituencies) Act. However, in 1937 university constituencies would be revived for the newly created Seanad.

The following general elections took place to the Free State Dáil during its existence:

- 1922 general election
- 1923 general election
- 1927 general election (June)
- 1927 general election (September)
- 1932 general election
- 1933 general election
- 1937 general election

=== Powers ===
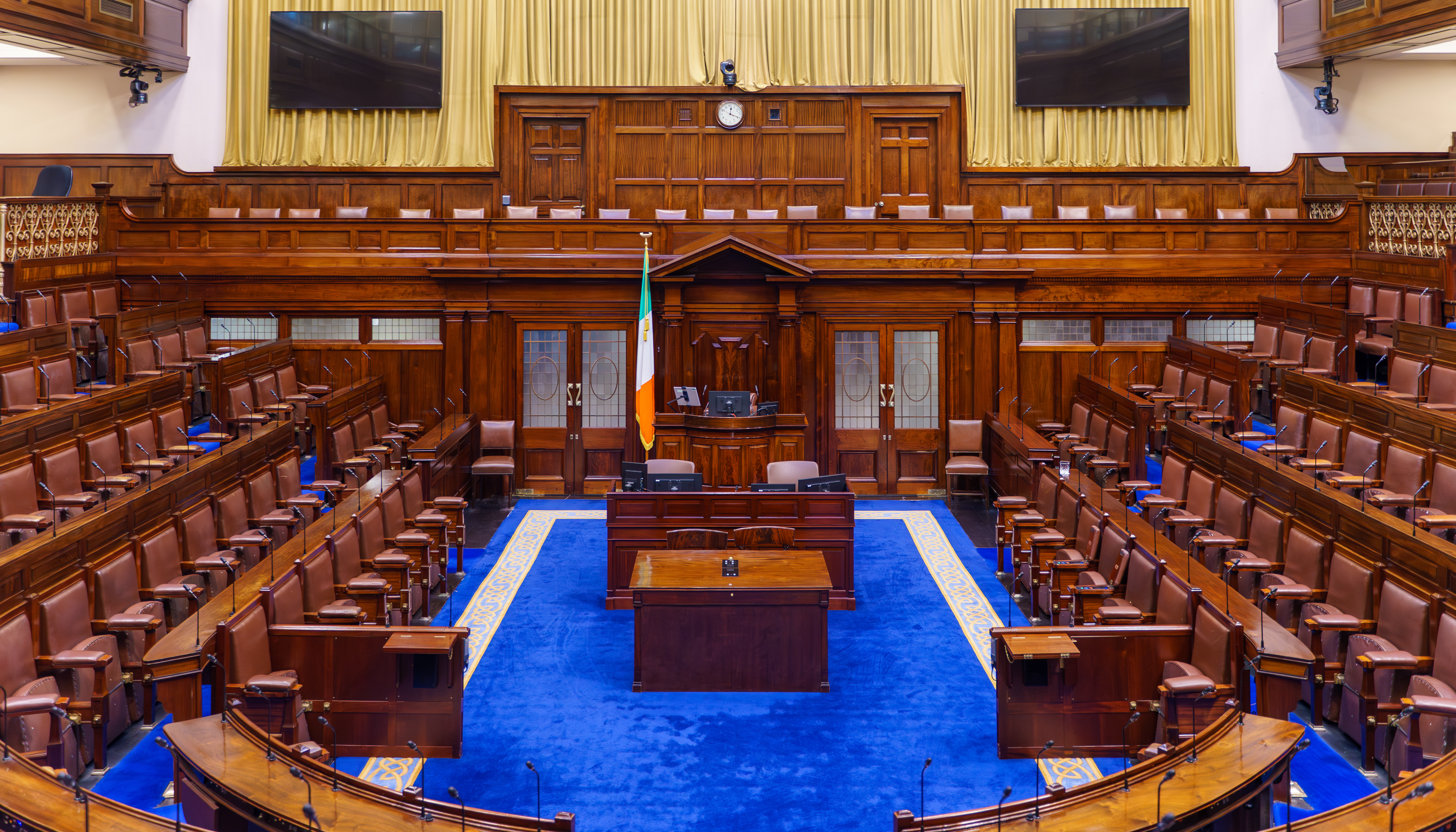
The Dáil Chamber as it currently stands. Unusually, the government sits on the Speaker's left, unlike the norm in most Westminster system parliaments, where the government sits on the speaker's right.

The Constitution of the Irish Free State provided that the President of the Executive Council would be appointed by the King "on the nomination of" the Dáil and that the Executive Council as a whole had to resign en bloc if it lost the confidence of the lower house. In practice these provision meant that the President was chosen by the Dáil, which could bring down his cabinet by a vote of no confidence, or failure to approve a vote of confidence. A constitutional amendment passed in 1936 removed the role of the King entirely and provided that, in the final months of the Free State, the President would be elected by the Dáil directly, rather than merely being 'nominated' by the lower house.

Technically a bill had to be approved by both Houses of the Oireachtas and to receive the Royal Assent to become law. However, in practice it was the Dáil that decided what laws would be enacted and repealed. Before its complete abolition the Free State Seanad merely had power to delay legislation.

While during the early years of the Irish Free State there existed a theoretical possibility that the King, or the Governor-General acting on his behalf, might veto an act of the Oireachtas or dismiss the Executive Council against the wishes of the Dáil. With the passage of the Royal and Parliamentary Titles Act 1927 the British Government lost the right to formally advise the King in relation to the Irish Free State and so the possibility of the Governor-General taking any action without the approval of the other institutions of government was a remote possibility.

Unlike its modern successor, the Dáil did not have authority to declare war, this power being reserved for the Oireachtas as a whole. However, in practice this distinction was not important. During the later days of the Irish Free State the Dáil, as the dominant component of the Oireachtas, had the effective authority to amend the constitution in any way it chose. Today this is a level of authority that no Dáil has had since 1941.

== Seanad Éireann ==
Seanad Éireann ("Senate of Ireland") was the upper house of the Oireachtas of the Irish Free State from 1922 until 1936. It is sometimes referred to as the 'First Seanad'. The Seanad was established under the 1922 Constitution of the Irish Free State but a number of constitutional amendments were subsequently made to change the manner of its election and it powers. It was abolished in 1936 when it attempted to obstruct constitutional reforms favoured by the government. It sat in Leinster House.

=== Powers ===
The Seanad was subordinate to Dáil and could delay but not veto decisions of that house. Nonetheless, the Seanad had more power than its successor, the modern Seanad, which can only delay normal legislation for three months. As originally adopted the constitution provided that the Seanad had power to delay a money bill for 21 days and delay any other bill for 270 days. The Constitution (Amendment No. 13) Act, passed on 23 July 1928 extended the Seanad's power of delay over (non-money) legislation from 9 months to 20 months.

=== Composition and elections ===
The 1922 version of the Constitution provided for a Seanad of 60 members directly elected. Members would serve 12-year terms, with one quarter of the house elected every three years. The members would be elected under the system of proportional representation by means of the single transferable vote in a single, nationwide, 15 seat constituency.

However, to get the house started, the body's initial membership would be appointed by Dáil and the President of the Executive Council. To complicate matters even further, after the holding of the first direct election, the constitution was amended by the Constitution (Amendment No. 6) Act, passed on 23 July 1928, so that the final three elections to the Seanad occurred by a method of indirect election. Therefore, in the 5 elections to the Seanad to occur before its abolition, 3 different systems were used.

It was originally required that membership of the Seanad be limited to those who were over 35 who would serve 12-year terms. The Constitution (Amendment No. 8) Act, passed on 25 October 1928, reduced the minimum age of eligibility for Seanad members to 30 and the Constitution (Amendment No. 7) Act, passed on 30 October 1928, reduced the term of office of senators to 9 years.

Today incarnations of the modern Seanad are given a new number after each Seanad election. Thus, the Seanad elected in 2020 is known as the 26th Seanad. This was not the custom during the Irish Free State because the Seanad was elected in stages and therefore considered to be in permanent session. However, as a gesture of continuity with its predecessor, the first Seanad elected after 1937 is numbered as the Second Seanad. The Seanad, despite the occurrence of three senatorial elections before its abolition, is considered to have been a single Seanad for the duration of its existence and is thus referred for that whole period as the First Seanad.

==== 1922 election ====
Half the initial membership of the Seanad was elected by the Dáil under the single transferable vote. The remaining half was appointed by the President of the Executive Council (prime minister), W. T. Cosgrave. Those elected by the Dáil were divided into two equal groups by lot, one assigned terms of three years and the other terms of nine years. Those appointed by the president were similarly divided and assigned terms of 6 years and 12 years. The President agreed to use his appointments in 1922 to grant extra representation to the Protestant minority in the state, most of whom were former Southern Unionists, to promote inclusiveness in the new Free State. As a result, of the sixty members of the first Seanad, as well as 36 Catholics, there were 20 Protestants, 3 Quakers and 1 Jew. It contained 7 peers, a dowager countess, 5 baronets and several knights. The New York Times remarked that the first Seanad was "representative of all classes", though it has also been described as, "the most curious political grouping in the history of the Irish state". Members included William Butler Yeats, Oliver St. John Gogarty and General Sir Bryan Mahon.

The opponents of the Anglo-Irish Treaty also opposed the new Seanad, and 37 of the senators' homes were burnt to the ground. Others were intimidated, kidnapped or almost assassinated. Nevertheless, the first Seanad greatly influenced the guiding principles and legislative foundations of the new state.

The first Cathaoirleach was Lord Glenavy, formerly the Lord Chief Justice of Ireland in 1916–21.

==== 1925 election ====
The 15 original 3-year seats came up for election in 1925, as did four other seats which had been filled temporarily by co-option. The 19 retiring members were automatically eligible for re-election; another 19 candidates were nominated by the Seanad (by the single transferable vote from a list of 29); the Dáil nominated 38 candidates (from a list of 57, again by the single transferable vote). The 76 candidates were then put to the public electorate on 17 September 1925, but without partisan campaigning, turnout was less than a quarter of the 1,345,000 potential voters. The count took two weeks. Only 8 of the former senators were re-elected, with particularly poor results for the Gaelic League and Douglas Hyde.

==== Subsequent elections ====
After the amendment of the constitution in 1928, future members of the Seanad were to be elected from a single constituency consisting of the combined membership of the outgoing Seanad and the Dáil, and the system was changed so that a third rather than a quarter of the Seanad would be replaced at each election. The elections were still held by secret ballot and under the single transferable vote. Elections took place under the new system in 1928, 1931, and 1934 before the Seanad was abolished in 1936.

The system for nominating candidates was also changed. After 1928, it was provided that the number of nominees would be equal to twice the number of seats to be filled and that half would be elected by the Dáil and the other half by the Seanad. Both houses used the single transferable vote for this purpose. The right of outgoing senators to nominate themselves was removed.

==== By-elections ====
The constitution originally provided that premature vacancies would be filled by a vote of the Seanad. However, a candidate elected in this way would serve only until the next senatorial election, when the seat would come up for election along with the others scheduled to be filled. The system was changed by the Constitution (Amendment No. 11) Act, passed on 17 December 1929, so that vacancies were filled by members of both houses voting together.

=== Direct democracy ===
As adopted the Constitution of the Irish Free State contained a number of provisions for direct democracy, which included a special role for the Seanad. Most importantly it was provided that the Seanad could, if three-fifths of its members agreed, demand a binding referendum on any bill. This was to allow the Seanad to appeal to voters directly if there was a disagreement between the two houses and if the Dáil attempted to override the Seanad. However, this power was taken from the Seanad in 1928 before it had been put into use. It was in compensation for this loss that the Seanad's powers of delay were increased in the same year.

Before it was removed, the Seanad's right to demand a referendum was contained in Article 47, which provided for voters to veto legislation directly in certain circumstances. The article provided that once a bill had been approved by both houses of the Oireachtas (or just by the Dáil, if it had over-ridden the Seanad), its enactment into law could be suspended if, within seven days, either a majority of the Seanad or three-fifths of all members of the Dáil so requested.

There would then be a further period of ninety days within which either 5% of all registered voters or 60% of the Seanad could demand a referendum on the bill. The referendum would be decided by a majority of votes cast and if rejected the bill would not become law. Article 47 did not apply to money bills or bills declared by both houses to be "necessary for the immediate preservation of the public peace, health or safety". The Constitution (Amendment No. 10) Act, passed on 12 July 1928, repealed Article 47 in its entirety, along with Article 48 which provided for an initiative process.

A similar power given to the Free State Seanad by Article 47 is granted to the modern Seanad by the 1937 Constitution of Ireland. Under the current constitution, a simple majority of senators (with the agreement of one-third of the Dáil) can request that the President of Ireland refer a bill to the people. The President can thus refuse to sign it until it has been approved either in an ordinary referendum or by the Dáil after it has reassembled after a general election. This power has never been used because the modern Seanad is designed in such a way as to have a permanent government majority.

=== Abolition ===
The Seanad was abolished entirely in 1936 after it delayed some Government proposals for constitutional changes by the Constitution (Amendment No. 24) Act which was passed on 29 May 1936. Éamon de Valera had seen its delay of his proposals as illegitimate; the continuing opposition majority had stemmed from a combination of his earlier boycott of the Free State Oireachtas and the provision for the Seanad's self-election. The abolition was highly controversial at the time and the last chairman Thomas Westropp Bennett played a key role. It opposed its own abolition, but this decision was over-ridden by the Dáil.

In the 1937 Constitution of Ireland de Valera created a new modern Seanad, Seanad Éireann. This new Seanad was considered to be the direct successor of the Free State Seanad.

== Role of the monarchy ==
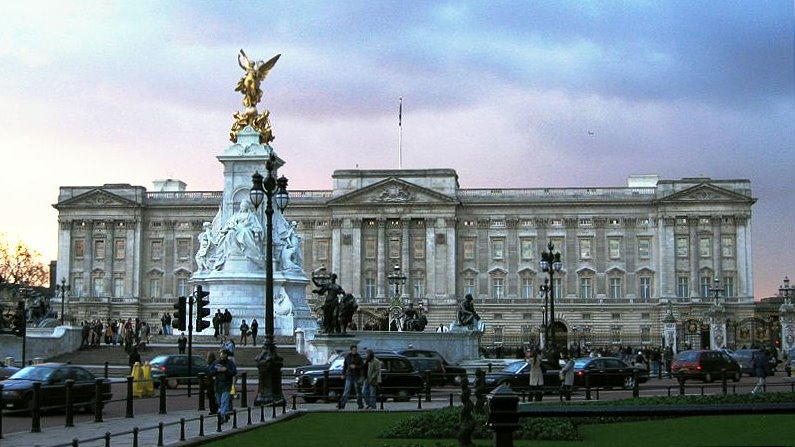
Buckingham Palace, official residence of the King, the third tier of the Free State Oireachtas.

The King was the same individual who held the position of King of the United Kingdom. Until 1927 he reigned in the Irish Free State as "King in Ireland". However, from 1927 onwards he technically reigned in the Irish Free State on a separate throne as "King of Ireland". The Oireachtas was dissolved by the King acting on the "advice" of the Executive Council. Members of either house had to take an oath of fidelity to the King known as the Oath of Allegiance before taking their seats. The King was the third component and constitute part of the Oireachtas in the same manner as in the Parliament of the United Kingdom

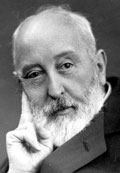
Tim Healy, The first Governor-General of the Irish Free State.

The King was represented in the Irish Free State by the Governor-General of the Irish Free State (Irish: Seanascal) who was the viceregal representative of the Monarch and carried out the duties and roles officially assigned to the monarch.

The Governor-General's Address or Governor-General's Speech was a formal address delivered by the Governor-General to Dáil Éireann, modelled on the speech from the throne given in other Dominions of the British Commonwealth. The address was a brief, businesslike event, lacking the pomp and ceremony of the State Opening of Parliament reflecting the general lack of enthusiasm for the Monarchy in the Irish Free State. It was written by the Executive Council and outlined the bills it intended to introduce. Technically the address was only to the Dáil, not to a joint session of both Houses of the Oireachtas. However, members of Seanad Éireann were invited into the Dáil chamber to attend the address, and subsequently discussed it after returning to their own chamber. Only the first two sessions of the Free State Oireachtas, in 1922 and 1923, had such an address.

The Governor-General was also the official who granted Royal Assent to Bills. A Bill, having duly passed or having been deemed to pass, in the Dáil and the Seanad, would be presented to the Governor-General by the President of the Executive Council of the Irish Free State. Unlike in the United Kingdom, no parliamentary ceremony was invoked to confirm that the Royal Assent had been given. Its details would instead be published in Iris Oifigiúil.

The process of Royal Assent was abolished by the Constitution (Amendment No. 27) Act 1936. The Act was the last to receive Royal Assent. The new Act instead required that the Ceann Comhairle sign bills into law. Under the new 1937 Constitution of Ireland, which came into force almost exactly one year later, the role of signing bills into law was given to the President of Ireland. This in particular is one of the reasons why there is some confusion in who was the Irish head of state from 1922 to 1949.

== Disbandment ==
On 29 December 1937 the Constitution of Ireland came into force and the Irish Free State was succeeded by a state known today as Ireland. The new constitution had been adopted by plebiscite on 1 July of that year, and on the same day the Ninth Dáil was elected. The Ninth Dáil was therefore elected as the lower house of the Free State Oireachtas but in December its role changed to that of lower house of a new legislature.

== See also ==
- History of the Republic of Ireland
