= George Nesbitt (Irish politician) =

Irish politician (1870s–1954)

Senator
- In office 11 December 1922 – 17 September 1925

Personal details
- Born: c.1870/1871 Kimmage, Dublin, Ireland
- Died: 1954 (aged 82–83) Dublin, Ireland
- Party: Independent
- Spouse: Enid Nesbitt

George J. Nesbitt (c. 1870/1871–1954) was an Irish businessman and Free State senator from Kimmage, Dublin.

He was educated at Synge Street CBS and University College Dublin. He was manager of Kernan & Co, a mineral water producer in Camden Street. He married Enid (b.1880/81) in 1906 or 1907. He was a member of the National Literary Society and a founding member of the Irish National Theatre (now the Abbey Theatre). He was among those who left the Theatre in 1906 to form the Theatre of Ireland (Cluithcheoirí na hÉireann), where he served as stage manager.

In 1916, he was active in the Irish National Aid Association, which supported republicans killed or imprisoned after the Easter Rising and their dependents. In 1918 he was appointed co-treasurer of Sinn Féin, alongside Jennie Wyse Power, after the previous board were arrested during the "German Plot" scare. During the Irish War of Independence, he was interned in Ballykinler camp, where he staged a play on Easter Sunday 1921. In 1922, he was among the founders of Irish Photoplays, which financed three feature films.

He was a member of the Seanad of the Irish Free State from its creation in 1922, being 26th of the 30 senators elected by the 3rd Dáil. He was an independent, though generally supportive of the government of Cumann na nGaedheal. He nominated himself for re-election in the 1925 Seanad election, finishing 59th of 76 candidates for 19 seats.

He died in 1954.

== Sources ==
- Matthews, Ann (2010). Renegades: Irish Republican Women 1900-1922. Mercier Press Ltd. ISBN 9781856356848.
- Vandevelde, Karen (2005). The Alternative Dramatic Revival In Ireland: 1887–1913. Maunsel & Company. ISBN 9781930901940.
