= Brian O'Rourke (politician) =

Irish politician and businessman (1874–1956)

Senator
- In office 27 April 1938 – 7 September 1938
- Constituency: Industrial and Commercial Panel

Senator
- In office 11 December 1922 – 29 May 1936

Personal details
- Born: Bernard Brian O'Rourke; 3 November 1874 County Monaghan, Ireland
- Died: 1 July 1956 (aged 81) Portobello, Dublin, Ireland
- Party: Fine Gael; Cumann na nGaedheal; Irish Parliamentary Party
- Spouse: Clare Clinton (m. 1907)
- Children: 7

Bernard Brian O'Rourke (Note: Called "Bernard" in some sources and "Brian" in others.) (3 November 1874 – 1 July 1956) was an Irish politician and businessman from Inniskeen, County Monaghan.

O'Rourke inherited a farm and corn mill outside Inniskeen and acquired a larger mill in Dundalk. He bought Belleek Pottery in 1918 and co-founded Arklow Pottery in 1934. Initially a supporter of the Irish Parliamentary Party (IPP), he was elected to Carrickmacross urban district council in 1899 and Monaghan County Council in 1905, and made a justice of the peace (JP) in 1906. He broke with the IPP when the Irish Volunteers split on the outbreak of World War I and IPP leader John Redmond advocated supporting the British war effort. For endorsing the 1916 Easter Rising, O'Rourke was interned and dismissed as a JP. During the Irish War of Independence he was a magistrate in the Dáil Courts. He supported the 1921 Anglo-Irish Treaty. Several of his properties were damaged by anti-Treaty forces in the Irish Civil War.

After the 1922 creation of the Irish Free State, O'Rourke was the fourth of 30 members of Seanad Éireann elected by members of the 3rd Dáil, serving a nine-year term and being re-elected in 1931 for another nine years, cut short by the Seanad's 1936 abolition. He was a member of Cumann na nGaedheal and its successor Fine Gael, for which he stood unsuccessfully in the Monaghan constituency in the 1937 general election. He returned to the reconstituted Seanad at the April 1938 election on the Industrial and Commercial Panel. Except for a gap from 1925 to 1929, he remained a county councillor until 1945.

O'Rourke married Clare Clinton in 1907; they had four daughters and three sons. His papers from the Irish revolutionary period were deposited at University College Dublin in 1993.
