= James Marmion Gilmor Carroll =

James Marmion Gilmor Carroll (23 October 1884 – 1 September 1962) was a prominent Anglo-Irish Roman Catholic and a businessman.

Carroll was educated at St. Augustine's College, Ramsgate, Kent. He married Helena Hearn on 21 June 1916 and the couple had one daughter, Grace Carroll.

He became chairman of P. J. Carroll & Company Ltd (once Ireland's oldest tobacco manufacturer and now a subsidiary of British American Tobacco plc) and of T. P. & R Goodbody (1929) Ltd., another Irish tobacco company, itself a subsidiary of Carroll's.

== Awards and decorations ==
- Knight of Honour and Devotion of the Sovereign Military Order of Malta (1947)
- Cross of Merit, 1st class with Crown (1953)
- Knight of the Order of St. Gregory the Great (1955)
- Bailiff Knight Grand Cross of Honour and Devotion of the Sovereign Military Order of Malta (1957)
