= James Parkinson (Irish politician) =

Irish politician and racehorse trainer (1869–1948)

Senator
- In office 27 April 1938 – 31 July 1947
- Constituency: Cultural and Educational Panel

Senator
- In office 11 December 1922 – 29 May 1936

Personal details
- Born: 15 November 1869 County Waterford, Ireland
- Died: 16 September 1948 (aged 78) County Kildare, Ireland
- Party: Fine Gael; Cumann na nGaedheal
- Spouse: Margaret Brophy
- Children: 8
- Education: Royal College of Veterinary Surgeons

James Joseph Parkinson (15 November 1869 – 16 September 1948) was an Irish politician. He was a member of Seanad Éireann from 1922 to 1936 and from 1938 to 1947. A veterinary surgeon, racehorse trainer, bloodstock breeder and company director, he was first elected to the Free State Seanad as a Cumann na nGaedheal member in 1922. From 1938 onwards, he was elected by the Cultural and Educational Panel as a Fine Gael member. He resigned from the Seanad on 31 July 1947 due to poor health.

"J.J." Parkinson was born at Tramore, County Waterford, and qualified as a veterinary surgeon (MRCVS) in London. From 1892 he briefly practised on the Curragh but soon moved into racing. After a short spell in the United States he settled at Maddenstown Lodge also on the Curragh which remained his home for forty-five years. He trained the winners of 2,577 races in Ireland, including two in the Irish Derby before his death after several years of ill-health at Maddenstown Lodge. Parkinson's total of race wins by a trainer was a record in Ireland until beaten by Dermot Weld in 2000, and he was champion trainer in Ireland by number of races won 23 times between 1904 and 1939.
