= Eileen Costello =

Irish politician and writer (1870–1962)

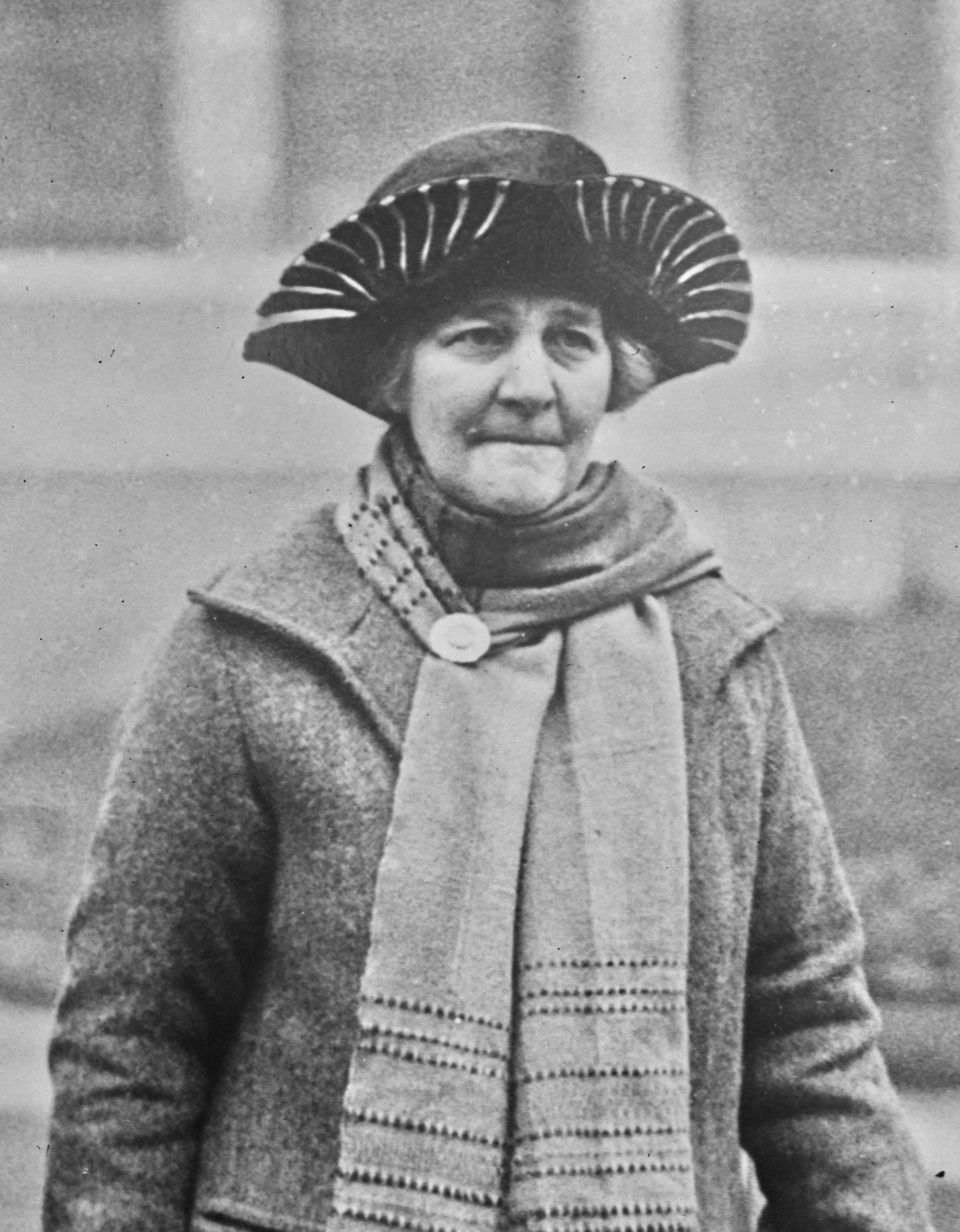
- Costello in 1922

Senator
- In office 11 December 1922 – 12 December 1934

Personal details
- Born: Edith Drury; 27 June 1870 London, England
- Died: 4 March 1962 (aged 91) County Galway, Ireland
- Party: Independent
- Spouse: Thomas Bodkin Costello (m. 1903; died 1956)
- Children: 1
- Occupation: Politician, writer, teacher, folklorist

Eileen (Ellen) Costello (Irish: Eibhlín Bean Uí Choisdealbha; née Edith Drury; 27 June 1870 – 4 March 1962) was an English-born Irish politician, writer, teacher and folklorist.

== Family ==
She was born Edith Drury on 27 June 1870 in St Pancras workhouse in London. Some accounts state her father, who worked as an attendant at the workhouse, was Michael Drury, a native of County Limerick, and her mother Agnes (Hopton) was Welsh, while others claim that her father was Welsh and her mother was from Limerick. It is likely that a charitable society assisted with her education.

Edith Drury became a teacher at St Michael's Church of England school, Buckingham Palace Road, London. She was a member of the various Irish organisations in London and became a member of the Gaelic League when it formed. It was there she learned Irish. A member of the committee, she was a representative on behalf of the London Branch at the Ardfheis in May 1902.

She began collecting Irish language songs in London (she first collected "Neillí Bhán" on a train coming from Woolwich). She converted to Roman Catholicism and, in 1903, she married Thomas Bodkin Costello (1864–1956), a medical doctor, historian, and fellow Gaelic Leaguer. They had one child, a daughter, writer Nuala Costello. The family lived in Tuam, County Galway, Ireland.

== Life in Ireland ==
Costello's collecting work really began in Tuam. Although she supplied extensive source-notes to the songs and information on their backgrounds (with English translations mainly by others), her motivation was not academic. She intended her volume primarily 'for popular use in the schools and Gaelic League classes of Connacht'.

Costello was involved in the Irish War of Independence in Tuam. She was elected to the Irish Free State Seanad Éireann as an independent member in December 1922. She was one of four women elected or appointed to the first Seanad in 1922. She was re-elected until she lost her seat in the 1934 Seanad election. Of the four women in the Senate, Costello was the only one who spoke to any notable extent. She was one of only two of the women senators who spoke against the Civil Service Regulation Bill, which would make it legal for the government to confine certain jobs to specific sexes and the Juries Bill which would require women to volunteer for jury service instead of it being a standard part of citizenship.

In 1919, Costello published a compilation of traditional folk-songs from County Galway and County Mayo, titled Amhráin Muighe Seola: Traditional folk-songs from Galway and Mayo.

== Literature ==
- Amhráin Muighe Seola, Eileen Costello, (London: Irish Folk Song Society; Dublin : Candle Press, 1919).
