= Joseph Clayton Love =

Irish politician (1872–1925)

Senator
- In office 11 December 1922 – 17 September 1925

Personal details
- Born: 14 February 1872 County Cork, Ireland
- Died: 1925 (aged 52–53)
- Party: Cumann na nGaedheal

Joseph Clayton Love (14 February 1872 – 1925) was an Irish politician. He was a Cumann na nGaedheal member of Seanad Éireann from 1922 to 1925. He was defeated at the 1925 Seanad election. Love was a fishmonger and fruit merchant in Cobh.
