= John Horgan (Irish nationalist) =

Irish politician, solicitor, and author

John Joseph Horgan (26 April 1881 – 21 July 1967) was an Irish, Cork-born active nationalist politician, solicitor and author. He supported and was closely associated with the Irish Parliamentary Party as well as the Irish Volunteers movement. He was a member of the Cork Harbour Commission for many decades and for a time chairman of the Cork Opera House.

== Background ==
The son of a Cork solicitor, he was educated at Clongowes Wood College, County Kildare, before becoming a solicitor in 1902. Through his father, who was Coroner for Cork City and County, he came to know Charles Stewart Parnell after his father nominated Parnell for Cork city in the 1880 general election and acted as his agent until his death. Horgan (jn.) supported the Irish Parliamentary Party founded by Parnell, later fostering an allegiance with its leaders, John Redmond and John Dillon. He took a close interest in matters relating to the Conradh na Gaeilge. Also keen on the arts, he was for many years chairman of the Cork Opera House. John Horgan was encouraged in his literary interests by Canon Sheehan of Doneraile. During the inquest in Kinsale for the victims of the Lusitania disaster in 1915 he presided as coroner, after which he joined the Coast Patrol service at Millcove near Rosscarbery witnessing the sinking of several cargo vessels during the following years. He sat on the board of the Cork Harbour Commission for the unusually long period of forty-nine years.

== National Politics ==
From 1913 Horgan was associated with the Irish Volunteers movement in Cork, after its split in 1914 was Captain in the National Volunteers. In regular contact with Eoin Mac Neill and Roger Casement, he exchanged frequent correspondence with both. Casement, in a long revealing reply to Horgan from February 1914, assured that . . . "freedom may come far sooner than you think. Go on with the Volunteers. . . . I’ll get you arms – if you get the men ready". However, when Casement landed in County Kerry in April 1916 on his hapless return from Germany, he was determined if possible to prevent a rebellion taking place. After his arrest, the Dublin Evening Mail published the fact that he had given a statement to a priest imploring the Volunteer leaders to cancel all plans for an insurrection.

Horgan defended Austin Stack in 1917 when charged under the Defence of the Realm Acts, but from 1918 became firmly convinced that the approach taken by constitutionalists was the only path that would have ensured the unity of Ireland. He wrote that following the tragic incident at Soloheadbeg in January 1919 the extremists triumphed, but likewise divided Ireland. Apart from his works, he published many articles, including a series of seven articles contributed to The Leader during June and July 1917 entitled An Irish Constitution as a prelude to the meeting of the Irish Convention.

Horgan had a major impact on municipal management in Ireland.In 1920 and 1923 he wrote articles for the journal Studies on a possible new city management system. When Cork corporation was dissolved in 1925, he was invited to draft a new system for municipal management. This led to the Cork city management act of 1929 creating the post of city manager. Fianna Fáil later extended this to the whole country.

He died in Cork, on 21 July 1967 aged 86 and was buried in St. Finbarr's Cemetery, Cork, his headstone sculpted by Séamus Murphy. A life size bronze bust sculpture was cast by Marshall J. Hutson in 1938. Horgan's Quay in Cork is named after him.

== Works ==
- Great Catholic Laymen (1908)
- Home Rule, a Critical Consideration (1911)
- The Complete Grammar of Anarchy (1918)
- From Parnell to Pearse Brown & Nolan Ltd., Dublin (1948)
