= Seanad Éireann (Irish Free State) =

Senate of the parliament (1922–1936)

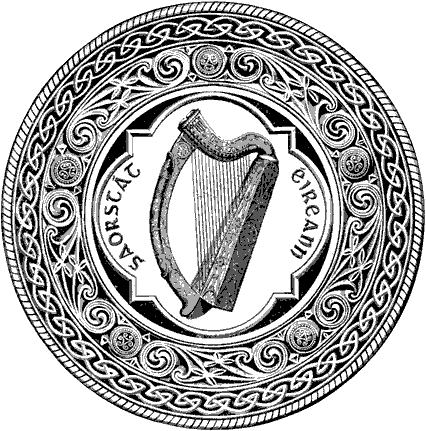
- Great Seal of the Irish Free State

Type
- Type: Upper house of Irish Free State

History
- Established: 11 December 1922
- Disbanded: 29 May 1936
- Preceded by: Senate of Southern Ireland
- Succeeded by: Seanad Éireann

Leadership
- Cathaoirleach: Lord Glenavy (1922–28); Thomas Westropp Bennett (1928–1936)

Structure
- Seats: 60
- Length of term: 3, 6, 9 or 12 years

Elections
- Voting system: Appointment by Dáil Éireann and President of the Executive Council; Direct election (1925); Election by members of Dáil and Seanad

Meeting place
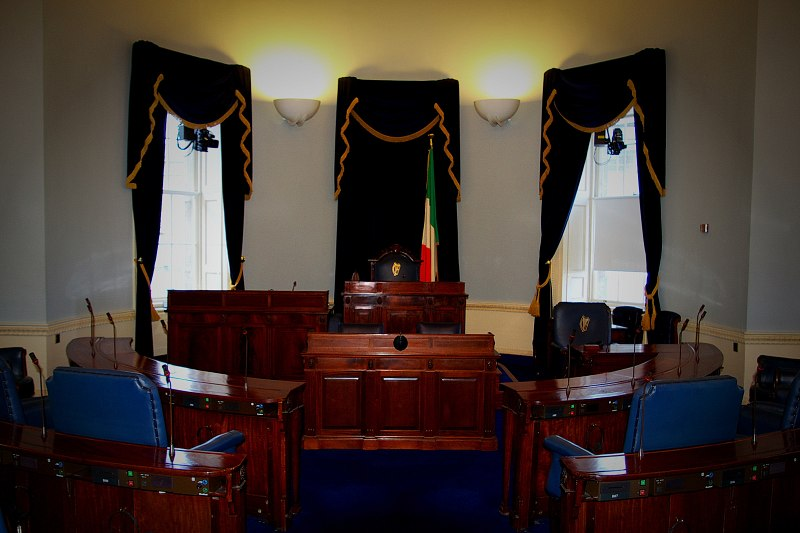
- Seanad Chamber, Leinster House, Dublin

Constitution
- Constitution of the Irish Free State

Seanad Éireann (Irish pronunciation: [ˈʃan̪ˠəd̪ˠ ˈeːɾʲən̪ˠ]; Senate of Ireland) was the upper house of the Oireachtas (parliament) of the Irish Free State from 1922 to 1936. It has also been known simply as the Senate, First Seanad, Free State Senate or Free State Seanad. The Seanad was established under the 1922 Constitution of the Irish Free State. A number of constitutional amendments were made to change the manner of its election and its powers. It was eventually abolished in 1936 when it attempted to obstruct constitutional reforms favoured by the government. It sat, like its modern successor, in Leinster House.

== Powers ==
The Seanad was subordinate to Dáil Éireann (the lower house) and could delay but not veto decisions of that house. Nonetheless, the Free State Senate had more power than its successor, the modern Seanad Éireann, which can only delay normal legislation for 90 days. As originally adopted the constitution provided that the Free State Seanad had power to delay a money bill for 21 days (three weeks) and delay any other bill for 270 days (approximately nine months)—with the potential for a further 9 months' delay if the Seanad voted to suspend a bill just passed into law in order to initiate a referendum on it. In 1928, this second period was extended so that the Seanad could delay a non-money bill for 20 months.

== Composition and election ==
The 1922 Constitution provided for a Seanad of 60 members directly elected. Members would serve 12-year terms, with one-quarter of the house elected every three years. The members would be elected under the system of proportional representation by means of the single transferable vote in a single, nationwide, 15-seat contest. However, the body's initial membership would be appointed by Dáil Éireann (the lower house) and the President of the Executive Council.

After the 1925 Seanad election, a direct election, the constitution was amended, so that further elections to the Seanad occurred by a method of indirect election. Therefore, in the five elections to the Seanad to occur before its abolition, three different systems were used.

The 1925 Seanad election was notable in that 19 were elected in a single contest using STV. This was the largest district magnitude used under STV anywhere in the world until 1995. The next time an Irish election used the whole country as a single district was for the 1945 presidential election.

Seanad membership was initially restricted to those who were over 35. Constitutional amendments made in 1928 reduced the minimum age to 30 and the term of office from 12 years to 9 years.

Seanad Éireann, established by the Constitution of Ireland in 1937 is considered to be a successor of the Free State Seanad. Each Seanad elected under the 1937 Constitution is numbered, beginning with the 2nd Seanad elected in 1938. The entire period of the Seanad of the Irish Free State was considered to have been the First Seanad.

=== 1922 election ===
Half the initial membership of the Seanad were appointed by the President of the Executive Council (prime minister), W. T. Cosgrave; the other half were elected by the Dáil under the single transferable vote. The first 15 elected by the Dáil were assigned a term of nine years, the other 15 a term of three years. Cosgrave's nominees were divided by lot, 15 to serve for twelve years and 15 for six years. The President agreed to use his appointments in 1922 to grant extra representation to the Protestant minority in the state, most of whom were former Southern Unionists, to promote inclusiveness in the new Free State.

As a result, of the sixty members of the first Seanad, as well as 36 Catholics, there were 20 Protestants, 3 Quakers and 1 Jew. It contained 7 peers, a dowager countess (Ellen, Countess of Desart, who was Jewish), 5 baronets and several knights. The New York Times remarked that the first senate was "representative of all classes", though it has also been described as, "the most curious political grouping in the history of the Irish state". Members included W. B. Yeats, Oliver St. John Gogarty, General Sir Bryan Mahon and Jennie Wyse Power.

Also included was the Earl of Kerry, heir to the 5th Marquess of Lansdowne. Lord Kerry succeeded his father in the peerage in June 1927, thus becoming the 6th Marquess of Lansdowne in his own right. This gave the new Lord Lansdowne an hereditary seat in the British House of Lords. Thus he had the unique distinction for a time of being a member of both the Oireachtas in Dublin and the British Parliament at Westminster.

The opponents of the Anglo-Irish Treaty also opposed the new Seanad, and 37 of the senators' homes were burnt to the ground. Others were intimidated, kidnapped or almost assassinated. Nevertheless, the first Seanad greatly influenced the guiding principles and legislative foundations of the new state.

The first Cathaoirleach (chairman) was Lord Glenavy. Lord Glenavy had formerly served as the Lord Chief Justice of Ireland from 1916 to 1918 and had served as Lord Chancellor of Ireland from 1918 to 1921.

George Sigerson served as chairman briefly from 11 to 12 December 1922 before the election of Lord Glenavy.

=== 1925 election ===
The 15 original 3-year seats came up for election in 1925, as did four other seats which had been filled temporarily by co-option. The 19 retiring members were automatically eligible for re-election; another 19 candidates were nominated by the Seanad (by the single transferable vote from a list of 29); the Dáil nominated 38 candidates (from a list of 57, again by the single transferable vote). The 76 candidates were then put to the public electorate on 17 September 1925, but without partisan campaigning, turnout was less than a quarter of the 1,345,000 potential voters. The count took two weeks. Only 8 of the former senators were re-elected, with particularly poor results for the Gaelic League and Douglas Hyde.

=== Subsequent elections ===
After the amendment of the constitution in 1928, future members of the Seanad were to be elected from a single constituency consisting of the combined membership of the outgoing Seanad and the Dáil, and the system was changed so that a third (20 seats) rather than a quarter (15 seats) of the Seanad would be replaced at each election. The elections were still held by secret ballot and under the single transferable vote. Elections took place under the new system in 1928, 1931, and 1934 before the Seanad was abolished in 1936.

The system for nominating candidates was also changed. After 1928, it was provided that the number of nominees would be equal to twice the number of seats to be filled and that half would be elected by the Dáil and the other half by the Seanad. Both houses used the single transferable vote for this purpose. The right of outgoing senators to nominate themselves was removed.

=== By-elections ===
The constitution originally provided that premature vacancies would be filled by a vote of the Seanad. However, a candidate elected in this way would serve only until the next senatorial election, when the seat would come up for election along with the others scheduled to be filled. In 1929, the system was changed so that vacancies were filled by members of both houses voting together.

=== Abolition ===
The Free State Seanad was abolished entirely by the Constitution (Amendment No. 24) Act 1936 after it delayed some Government proposals for constitutional changes. Éamon de Valera had seen its delay of his proposals as illegitimate, although the continuing opposition majority had been a result of his own earlier boycott of the Free State Oireachtas (combined with the provision for the Seanad's self-election). The abolition was highly controversial at the time and the last chairman Thomas Westropp Bennett played a key role. It opposed its own abolition, but this decision was over-ridden by the Dáil. De Valera later created a new Senate in the 1937 Constitution of Ireland.

== Direct democracy role ==
As adopted, the Free State constitution contained a number of provisions for direct democracy, which included a special role for the Seanad. Most importantly it was provided that the Seanad could, if three-fifths of its members agreed, demand a binding referendum on any bill. This was to allow the Seanad to appeal to voters directly if there was a disagreement between the two houses and if the Dáil attempted to override the Seanad. However, this power was taken from the Seanad in 1928 without having been put to use. It was in compensation for this loss that the Seanad's powers of delay were increased in the same year.

Before it was removed, the Seanad's right to demand a referendum was contained in Article 47, which provided for voters to veto legislation directly in certain circumstances. The article provided that once a bill had been approved by both houses of the Oireachtas (or just by the Dáil, if it had over-ridden the Seanad), its enactment into law could be suspended if, within seven days, either a majority of the Seanad or three-fifths of all members of the Dáil so requested.

There would then be a further period of ninety days within which either 5% of all registered voters or 60% of the Seanad could demand a referendum on the bill. The referendum would be decided by a majority of votes cast and if rejected the bill would not become law. Article 47 did not apply to money bills or bills declared by both houses to be "necessary for the immediate preservation of the public peace, health or safety". In 1928, Article 47 was repealed in its entirety, along with Article 48 which provided for an initiative process.

A similar power given to the Free State Seanad by Article 47 is granted to the modern Seanad by the 1937 Constitution of Ireland. Under the current constitution, a simple majority of senators (with the agreement of one-third of the Dáil) can request that the President of Ireland refer a bill to the people. The president can thus refuse to sign it until it has been approved either in an ordinary referendum or by the Dáil after it has reassembled after a general election. This power has never been used because the modern Seanad is designed in such a way as to have a permanent government majority.

== List of constitutional amendments ==
During the Irish Free State there were at least 12 constitutional amendments relating to the Seanad. The value n where the amending act had the short title "Constitution (Amendment No. n) Act year"

No.	Date	Effect
1	11 July 1925	Made changes relating to the terms of office of senators and to the date on which senatorial elections were to be held.
10	12 July 1928	Removed a number of provisions for direct democracy from the constitution such as the right of the Seanad to force a referendum on certain bills.
6	23 July 1928	Replaced the direct election of the Seanad with the system of indirect election.
13	23 July 1928	Extended the Seanad's power of delay over legislation from 9 months to 20 months.
8	25 October 1928	Reduced the age of eligibility for senators from 35 to 30.
9	25 October 1928	Removed the existing provisions for the nomination of Seanad candidates and empowered the Oireachtas to make alternative arrangements by law. The new system of nomination was then introduced by the Seanad Electoral Act 1928 (enacted on the same day).
7	30 October 1928	Reduced the term of office of senators from 12 years to 9 years.
14	14 May 1929	Clarified a technical matter relating to the relationship between the two houses of the Oireachtas.
15	14 May 1929	Permitted one member of the Executive Council (cabinet) to be a senator, as previously it had been required that all be members of the Dáil. The President, the Vice-President, and the Minister for Finance still had to hold seats in the Dáil.
11	17 December 1929	Altered the method for the filling of premature vacancies in the Seanad.
12	24 March 1930	Altered provisions relating to the Committee of Privileges that had the authority to resolve disputes between the two Houses of the Oireachtas over the definition of a money bill.
24	29 May 1936	Abolished the Seanad.

== Notable members ==
- Thomas Westropp Bennett
- Kathleen Browne
- Kathleen Clarke
- Eileen Costello
- Ellen Cuffe
- Sir Thomas Esmonde
- James Campbell
- Oliver St. John Gogarty
- Alice Stopford Green
- Henry Guinness
- Sir William Hickie
- Douglas Hyde
- Thomas Johnson
- Henry Petty-Fitzmaurice
- Edward MacLysaght
- Sir Bryan Mahon
- Maurice George Moore
- Sir Horace Plunkett
- George Sigerson
- Jennie Wyse Power
- Windham Wyndham-Quin
- W. B. Yeats

== See also ==
- History of the Republic of Ireland
- Parliament of Southern Ireland
- Category:Members of Seanad Éireann by term
