= Records of members of the Oireachtas =

This is a list of records relating to the Oireachtas, the national parliament of Ireland, which consists of the President of Ireland, and two Houses, Dáil Éireann, a house of representatives whose members are known as Teachtaí Dála or TDs, and Seanad Éireann, a senate whose members are known as senators.

The First Dáil consisted of the Sinn Féin MPs who were elected in the United Kingdom general election of 14 December 1918. They refused to attend the British House of Commons and instead assembled for the first time on 21 January 1919 in the Mansion House in Dublin as the revolutionary unicameral Dáil Éireann.

1,292 TDs have served in the Dáil between 1919 and 2018. The title Father of the Dáil is usually and unofficially conferred on the longest-serving member.

== Longest-serving former TDs ==
This is a list of former TDs who have served at least 30 years in the Dáil. Unless otherwise specified, start and end dates given are those of the relevant general election. Unless stated, the TD listed did not stand in the end-date election.

Name	Party	Elected b – by-election	Vacated seat	Dáil Service	Notes
Paddy Smith	Anti-Treaty Sinn Féin; Fianna Fáil	1923	1977	53y 11m	Cabinet minister
Frank Aiken	Anti-Treaty Sinn Féin; Fianna Fáil	1923	1973	49y 6m	Longest-serving cabinet minister (1932–1948, 1951–1954, 1957–1969)
Neil Blaney	Fianna Fáil; Independent Fianna Fáil	1948 b	Died on 8 November 1995	46y 11m	Cabinet minister
Thomas McEllistrim	Anti-Treaty Sinn Féin; Fianna Fáil	1923	1969	45y 10m	
Séamus Pattison	Labour	1961	2007	45y 8m	Ceann Comhairle (1997–2002)
Seán MacEntee	Sinn Féin; Fianna Fáil	1918	1969	45y 6m	Did not hold office between the 1922 and June 1927 elections
James Ryan	Sinn Féin; Fianna Fáil	1918	1965	45y 2m	Long-serving cabinet minister. Did not hold office between the 1922 and 1923 elections (1y 2m)
Seán Lemass	Anti-Treaty Sinn Féin; Fianna Fáil	1924 b	1969	44y 7m	Taoiseach (1959–1966)
James Everett	Labour; National Labour	1923	Died on 18 December 1967	44y 4m	Cabinet minister; leader of the breakaway National Labour (1944–1950)
Enda Kenny	Fine Gael	1975 b	2020	44y 2m	Taoiseach (2011–2017)
Oliver J. Flanagan	Fine Gael	1943	1987	43y 8m	Cabinet minister
Bernard Durkan	Fine Gael	1981	2024	43y 5m	TD, Senator from February 1982 to November 1982
Richard Bruton	Fine Gael	1981	2024	43y 1m	Cabinet minister; senator from October 1981 to February 1982
Martin Corry	Fianna Fáil	June 1927	1969	41y 10m	
Patrick McGilligan	Cumann na nGaedheal; Fine Gael	1923 b	1965	41y 5m	Attorney General (1954–1957)
Richard Mulcahy	Sinn Féin; Cumann na nGaedheal; Fine Gael	1918	1961	41y	Did not hold office between the 1937 and 1938 elections, nor between those of 1943 and 1944
Éamon de Valera	Sinn Féin; Fianna Fáil	1918	Elected President in 1959	40y 6m	Taoiseach and President of Ireland; first elected to Westminster at the June 1917 by-election
Cormac Breslin	Fianna Fáil	1937	1977	40y	Ceann Comhairle (1967–1973)
Patrick Hogan	Labour	1923	Died on 24 January 1969	39y 8m	Did not hold office between the 1938 and 1943 elections, nor between those of 1944 and 1948
Michael Noonan	Fine Gael	1981	2020	38y 7m	Cabinet minister. Leader of Fine Gael (2001–2002)
Gerald Boland	Anti-Treaty Sinn Féin; Fianna Fáil	1923	1961	38y 2m	Long-serving cabinet minister
Liam Cosgrave	Fine Gael	1943	1981	38y	Taoiseach (1973–1977)
Dan Spring	Labour; National Labour	1943	1981	38y	Member of the breakaway National Labour (1944–1950)
Ruairi Quinn	Labour	1977	2016	38y	Senator from 1981 to February 1982
Michael Kennedy	Fianna Fáil	June 1927	1965	37y 10m	
Brendan Howlin	Labour	1987	2024	37y 8m	Cabinet minister; leader of Labour (2016–2020); senator from 1983 to 1987
Seán Brady	Fianna Fáil	September 1927	1965	37y 7m	
Bob Briscoe	Fianna Fáil	September 1927	1965	37y 7m	
James Dillon	National Centre Party; Fine Gael; Independent	1932	1969	37y 4m	Leader of Fine Gael (1959–1965)
David Andrews	Fianna Fáil	1965	2002	37y 1m	
Ben Briscoe	Fianna Fáil	1965	2002	37y 1m	
Bobby Molloy	Fianna Fáil; Progressive Democrats	1965	2002	37y 1m	Joined Progressive Democrats in 1986; previously Fianna Fáil
Brendan Corish	Labour	1945 b	February 1982	36y 2m	Tánaiste (1973–1977)
Dan Breen	Anti-Treaty Sinn Féin; Fianna Fáil	1923	1965	35y 11m	Did not hold office between the June 1927 and 1932 elections
Paddy Harte	Fine Gael	1961	1997	35y 8m	Father of the Dáil (1997–2007)
Charles Haughey	Fianna Fáil	1957	1992	35y 8m	Taoiseach (1979–1981, 1982, 1987–1992)
Seán Treacy	Labour; Independent	1961	1997	35y 8m	Ceann Comhairle (1987–1997)
John A. Costello	Fine Gael	1933	1969	35y 7m	Did not hold office between the 1943 and 1944 elections. Taoiseach (1948–1951, 1954–1957)
Vivion de Valera	Fianna Fáil	1945 b	1981	35y 7m	Son of Éamon de Valera
John Bruton	Fine Gael	1969	Resigned on 31 October 2004	35y 4m	Taoiseach (1994–1997). Resigned as TD to become EU Ambassador to the United States
Erskine H. Childers	Fianna Fáil	1938	Elected President in 1973	35y	Tánaiste (1969–1973) and President of Ireland (1973–1974)
Frank Fahy	Sinn Féin; Fianna Fáil	1918	Died on 14 July 1953	34y 10m	Ceann Comhairle (1932–1951)
Mícheál Ó Móráin	Fianna Fáil	1938	1973	34y 8m	Cabinet minister
Maurice E. Dockrell	Fine Gael	1943	1977	34y 1m	
Desmond O'Malley	Fianna Fáil; Progressive Democrats	1968 b	2002	34y	Founder of the Progressive Democrats and cabinet minister
Dinny McGinley	Fine Gael	February 1982	2016	34y	
Bertie Ahern	Fianna Fáil	1977	2011	33y 8m	Taoiseach (1997–2008)
Rory O'Hanlon	Fianna Fáil	1977	2011	33y 8m	Ceann Comhairle (2002–2007)
Jim O'Keeffe	Fine Gael	1977	2011	33y 8m	Cabinet minister
Michael Woods	Fianna Fáil	1977	2011	33y 8m	Cabinet minister
Daniel Morrissey	Cumann na nGaedheal; Fine Gael	1923	1957	33y 7m	Cabinet minister
Jack Lynch	Fianna Fáil	1948	1981	33y 4m	Taoiseach (1966–1973, 1977–1979)
Seán Barrett	Fine Gael	1981	2020	33y 4m	Did not hold office between the 2002 and 2007 elections. Ceann Comhairle (2011–2016) and cabinet minister.
John Browne	Fianna Fáil	November 1982	2016	33y 3m	
Séamus Kirk	Fianna Fáil	November 1982	2016	33y 3m	Ceann Comhairle (2009–2011)
Gerald Bartley	Fianna Fáil	1932	1965	33y 2m	Cabinet minister
Seán Mac Eoin	Cumann na nGaedheal; Fine Gael	1932	1965	33y 2m	Cabinet minister
Michael P. Kitt	Fianna Fáil	1975 b	2016	32y 11m	Senator from 1977 to 1981, and from 2002 to 2007
Charles Flanagan	Fine Gael	1987	2024	32y 8m	Cabinet minister; did not hold office between the 2002 and 2007 elections
Noel Davern	Fianna Fáil	1969	2007	32y 4m	Did not hold office between the 1981 and 1987 elections
Éamon Ó Cuív	Fianna Fáil	1992	2024	31y 11m	Cabinet minister; senator from 1989 to 1992
Róisín Shortall	Social Democrats; Labour; Independent	1992	2024	31y 11m	Co-leader of the Social Democrats (2015–2023); longest-serving female TD
Michael Ring	Fine Gael	1994 b	2024	30y 5m	Cabinet minister
Michael Creed	Fine Gael	1989	2024	30y 4m	Cabinet minister; did not hold office between the 2002 and 2007 elections

== Shortest-serving former TDs ==
This is a list of former TDs who served for less than 1 year in the Dáil. Unless otherwise specified, start and end dates given are those of the relevant general election.

Name	Party	Elected b = by-election	Vacated seat	Months	Notes
Kieran Doherty	Anti H-Block	1981	Died on 2 August 1981	2m	Died after 73 days on hunger strike; was a TD for 52 days
Pierce McCan	Sinn Féin	1918	Died in prison of influenza, 6 March 1919	3m	The Westminster election was on 14 December 1918, but the First Dáil did not sit until 21 January 1919
Michael Carter	Farmers' Party	June 1927	Lost seat in September 1927	3m	
Arthur Clery	Independent	June 1927	Did not contest September 1927	3m	
Denis Cullen	Labour	June 1927	Lost seat in September 1927	3m	
William Duffy	National League	June 1927	Did not contest September 1927	3m	
Thomas Falvey	Farmers' Party	June 1927	Lost seat in September 1927	3m	
Hugh Garahan	Farmers' Party	June 1927	Lost seat in September 1927	3m	
John Gill	Labour	June 1927	Lost seat in September 1927	3m	
Gilbert Hewson	Independent	June 1927	Lost seat in September 1927	3m	
John Horgan	National League	June 1927	Lost seat in September 1927	3m	
John Jinks	National League	June 1927	Lost seat in September 1927	3m	
Gilbert Lynch	Labour	June 1927	Lost seat in September 1927	3m	
Eugene Mullen	Fianna Fáil	June 1927	Lost seat in September 1927	3m	
David O'Gorman	Farmers' Party	June 1927	Lost seat in September 1927	3m	
Timothy Quill	Labour	June 1927	Lost seat in September 1927	3m	
James Shannon	Labour	June 1927	Lost seat in September 1927	3m	
Thomas Tynan	Fianna Fáil	June 1927	Lost seat in September 1927	3m	
Frank Drohan	Sinn Féin	1921	Resigned on 5 January 1922	7m	Returned unopposed on 24 May 1921; the Second Dáil convened on 16 August 1921.
George Lee	Fine Gael	June 2009 b	Resigned on 8 February 2010	8m	
Carrie Acheson	Fianna Fáil	1981	Lost seat in February 1982	9m	
Paddy Agnew	Anti H-Block	1981	Did not contest February 1982	9m	
Carey Joyce	Fianna Fáil	1981	Lost seat in February 1982	9m	
Seán Dublin Bay Loftus	Independent	1981	Lost seat in February 1982	9m	
Hugh Kennedy	Cumann na nGaedheal	October 1923 b	Resigned on 25 June 1924	9m	Resigned to become Chief Justice of the Irish Free State
Thomas Bellew	Fianna Fáil	February 1982	Lost seat in November 1982	10m	
Gerry Brady	Fianna Fáil	February 1982	Lost seat in November 1982	10m	
Ned Brennan	Fianna Fáil	February 1982	Lost seat in November 1982	10m	
Jim Corr	Fine Gael	February 1982	Did not contest November 1982	10m	
Henry Coyle	Cumann na nGaedheal	1923	Disqualified on 9 May 1924	10m	Sentenced to three years' imprisonment for bouncing cheques
Alexis FitzGerald Jnr	Fine Gael	February 1982	Lost seat in November 1982	10m	
Patrick Gallagher	Sinn Féin The Workers' Party	February 1982	Lost seat in November 1982	10m	
Thomas O'Mahony	Cumann na nGaedheal	1923	Died on 20 July 1924	11m	
Richard Stapleton	Labour	1943	Lost seat in 1944	11m	

The following were eligible for membership of the Dáil, but as Unionists, they did not recognise it. Those elected to Westminster in 1918 were eligible for the First Dáil.

Name	Party	Elected	Vacated Westminster seat	Months	Notes
Hugh Anderson	Irish Unionist	1918	Resignation in 1919	< 3m	By-election was held on 4 March 1919
Robert McCalmont	Irish Unionist	1918	Appointment as Commander of the Irish Guards in 1919	< 6m	By-election was held on 27 May 1919
Arthur Samuels	Irish Unionist	1918	Appointment to the King's Bench in 1919	< 8m	By-election was held on 28 July 1919

== Current office-holders, longest service in the Oireachtas ==
This is a list of current members of the Oireachtas who have served for at least 20 years, with continuous or broken service. Unless otherwise specified, start dates given are those of the relevant election.

Name	Party	Office	First elected/appointed b = by-election	Years/Months (as of 18 November 2026)	Notes
Willie O'Dea	Fianna Fáil	TD	February 1982	44 years, 9 months	Father of the Dáil
Michael Lowry	Independent	TD	1987	39 years, 9 months	
Micheál Martin	Fianna Fáil	TD	1989	37 years, 5 months	Leader of Fianna Fáil
Brendan Smith	Fianna Fáil	TD	1992	33 years, 11 months	
John McGuinness	Fianna Fáil	TD	1997	29 years, 5 months	
Michael Moynihan	Fianna Fáil	TD	1997	29 years, 5 months	
Seán Fleming	Fianna Fáil	TD	1997	29 years, 5 months	
Pat "the Cope" Gallagher	Fianna Fáil	TD	1981	28 years, 8 months (as of July 2026)	TD from 1981 to 1997, 2002 to 2009, 2016 to 2020, and from 2024.
Seán Ó Fearghaíl	Fianna Fáil	Senator; TD	2000 b	26 years, 5 months	Senator from 2000 to 2002
Noel Grealish	Independent	TD	2002	24 years, 6 months	
Aengus Ó Snodaigh	Sinn Féin	TD	2002	24 years, 6 months	
Frank Feighan	Fine Gael	TD; Senator	2002	23 years, 10 months (as of July 2026)	Senator from 2002 to 2007, and 2016 to 2020. TD from 2007 to 2016 and from 2020.
Timmy Dooley	Fianna Fáil	TD; Senator	2002	23 years, 5 months (as of July 2026)	Senator from 2002 to 2007, and 2020 to 2024. TD from 2007 to 2020 and from 2024.
Michael McDowell	Independent	TD; Senator	1987	21 years, 11 month (as ofJuly 2026)	Did not hold office between 1989 and 1992, 1997 and 2002, 2007 and 2016. Senator from 2016.

== Longest-serving Senators ==
This is a list of current and former senators who have served for at least 20 years in the Seanad, including both the Free State Seanad and the Seanad established under the 1937 Constitution. There was a 22-month gap between the abolition of the Free State Seanad in 1936 and the inauguration in 1938 of the 2nd Seanad, the first incarnation of the new body.

- denotes serving senator

Name	Party	First elected	Vacated seat	Years/Months	Notes
David Norris	Independent	25 April 1987	22 January 2024	36 years, 8 months	Resigned seat
Henry Barniville	Fine Gael	6 December 1922	23 September 1960	35 years, 11 months	Service interrupted by the abolition of the Free State Seanad
Paddy Burke	Fine Gael	17 February 1993	30 January 2025	31 years, 11 months	
Margaret Mary Pearse	Fianna Fáil	27 April 1938	7 November 1968	30 years, 6 months	
Denis O'Donovan	Fianna Fáil	1 November 1989	30 January 2025	30 years, 3 months	Did not serve in 20th or 22nd Seanad
Eoin Ryan Snr	Fianna Fáil	22 May 1957	3 April 1987	29 years, 10 months	
Liam Ó Buachalla	Fianna Fáil	7 October 1939	24 July 1969	29 years, 9 months	
Shane Ross	Independent	8 October 1981	26 February 2011	29 years, 4 months	
James G. Douglas	Independent	6 December 1922	16 September 1954	28 years, 9 months	Service interrupted by the abolition of the Free State Seanad; Did not serve in 4th Seanad
Rory Kiely	Fianna Fáil	27 October 1977	22 July 2007	28 years, 9 months	Did not serve in 16th Seanad
Patrick McGowan	Fianna Fáil	23 June 1965	3 October 1999	28 years, 5 months	Did not serve in 15th, 16th and 17th Seanad
Des Hanafin	Fianna Fáil	5 November 1969	26 June 2002	27 years, 10 months	Did not serve in 20th Seanad
William Ryan	Fianna Fáil	14 December 1961	5 July 1989	27 years, 6 months	
Michael Hayes	Fine Gael	27 April 1938	28 April 1965	27 years	
Charles McDonald	Fine Gael	14 December 1961	17 December 1992	26 years, 4 months	Did not serve in 13th Seanad
Paschal Mooney	Fianna Fáil	25 April 1987	April 2016	26 years, 4 months	Did not serve 2y, 6m from July 2007 to January 2010
John Counihan	Independent	6 December 1922	25 July 1951	26 years, 3 months	Did not serve in 2nd Seanad
Thomas Ruane	Fianna Fáil	6 December 1934	28 April 1965	25 years, 9 months	Service interrupted by the abolition of the Free State Seanad; Did not serve in 4th and 6th Seanad
Patrick O'Reilly	Fianna Fáil	18 August 1944	24 July 1969	24 years, 11 months	
Seán O'Donovan	Fianna Fáil	27 April 1938	24 July 1969	24 years, 10 months	Did not serve in 6th and 8th Seanad
Mick Lanigan	Fianna Fáil	27 October 1977	26 June 2002	24 years, 7 months	
Diarmuid Wilson	Fianna Fáil	12 September 2002	Incumbent	24 years, 2 months	
Joe O'Toole	Independent	25 April 1987	29 April 2011	24 years	
Donie Cassidy	Fianna Fáil	13 May 1982	29 April 2011	24 years	Did not serve in 22nd Seanad from 2002 to 2007
Feargal Quinn	Independent	17 February 1993	April 2016	23 years, 2 months	
James Parkinson	Fine Gael	6 December 1922	31 July 1947	22 years, 9 months	Service interrupted by the abolition of the Free State Seanad
Paul Coghlan	Fine Gael	20 September 1997	27 March 2020	22 years, 6 months	
Patrick Baxter	Clann na Talmhan	6 December 1934	3 April 1959	22 years, 5 months	Service interrupted by the abolition of the Free State Seanad
John Butler	Labour	27 April 1938	28 April 1965	22 years, 3 months	Did not serve in 9th Seanad
Seán Hayes	Fianna Fáil	27 April 1938	28 April 1965	22 years, 2 months	Did not serve in 4th and 6th Seanad
William O'Callaghan	Independent	27 April 1938	1 September 1961	22 years, 2 months	Did not serve in 4th Seanad
James Tunney	Labour	27 April 1938	1 September 1961	22 years, 2 months	Did not serve in 4th Seanad
Thomas Foran	Labour	28 November 1923	12 March 1948	22 years	Did not serve in 2nd Seanad
Patrick Fitzsimons	Independent	21 April 1948	30 March 1973	22 years	Did not serve in 8th Seanad
Peter Lynch	Independent	7 September 1938	1 September 1961	22 years	
Sir John Keane	Independent	6 December 1922	12 March 1948	21 years, 10 months	Did not serve in 1934–1936 Seanad
Francis O'Brien	Fianna Fáil	1 October 1989	29 April 2011	21 years, 7 months	
William Quirke	Independent	6 December 1931	5 March 1955	21 years, 4 months	Service interrupted by the abolition of the Free State Seanad
William Bedell Stanford	Independent	21 April 1948	24 July 1969	21 years, 3 months	
Michael Yeats	Fianna Fáil	14 August 1951	12 March 1980	21 years	Did not serve in 8th and 9th Seanad
James Dooge	Fine Gael	14 December 1961	3 April 1987	20 years, 10 months	Did not serve in 14th Seanad
Micheál Prendergast	Fine Gael	22 July 1954	26 May 1977	20 years, 9 months	Did not serve from March 1973 to April 1975
Brian Mullooly	Fianna Fáil	8 October 1981	26 June 2002	20 years, 8 months	
Brendan Ryan	Independent	13 May 1982	22 July 2007	20 years, 5 months	Did not serve in 20th Seanad
Eddie Bohan	Fianna Fáil	25 April 1987	22 July 2007	20 years, 2 months	
Don Lydon	Fianna Fáil	25 April 1987	22 July 2007	20 years, 2 months	
Bernard McGlinchey	Fianna Fáil	14 December 1961	21 December 1982	20 years, 2 months	Did not serve in 15th Seanad
Patrick Quinlan	Independent	22 May 1957	26 May 1977	20 years	

== Oldest living former office-holders ==
Aged 85 or older:

Name	Office(s) held	Date of birth	Age	Year retired
Tom Fitzpatrick	TD	29 July 1926	100 years, 3 months	1982
Patrick Norton	TD / Senator	1928	97 years, 10 months+	1973
Eileen Lemass	TD / MEP	7 July 1932	94 years, 4 months	1989
Roger Garland	TD	February 1933	93 years, 8 months+	1992
Liam Hyland	TD / Senator / MEP	23 April 1933	93 years, 6 months	2004
Tom Raftery	Senator / MEP	15 August 1933	93 years, 3 months	1993
Catherine McGuinness	Senator	14 November 1934	92 years	1987
Ann Ormonde	Senator	20 January 1935	91 years, 9 months	2011
Bríd Rodgers	Senator	20 February 1935	91 years, 8 months	2002
Brian Mullooly	Senator	21 February 1935	91 years, 8 months	2002
Barry Desmond	TD	15 May 1935	91 years, 6 months	1994
Charles McDonald	TD / Senator / MEP	11 June 1935	91 years, 5 months	1993
Brendan Griffin	TD	28 August 1935	91 years, 2 months	1989
Michael Woods	TD	8 December 1935	90 years, 11 months	2011
Camilla Hannon	Senator	21 July 1936	90 years, 3 months	1982
Barry Cogan	TD / Senator	27 September 1936	90 years, 1 month	1982
Matt Brennan	TD	16 October 1936	90 years, 1 month	2002
Jim Fitzsimons	TD / MEP	16 December 1936	89 years, 11 months	2004
John Donnellan	TD	27 March 1937	89 years, 7 months	1989
Mick Lanigan	Senator	30 January 1938	88 years, 9 months	2002
Ray MacSharry	TD	29 April 1938	88 years, 6 months	1988
Joe Jacob	TD	1 April 1939	87 years, 7 months	2007
Pádraig Flynn	TD	9 May 1939	87 years, 6 months	1999
Labhrás Ó Murchú	Senator	14 August 1939	87 years, 3 months	2016
Tom Gildea	TD	September 1939	87 years, 2 months	2004
Tom Moffatt	TD	January 1940	86 years, 10 months	2002
John Dennehy	TD	22 March 1940	86 years, 7 months	1992
Lorcan Allen	TD	27 March 1940	86 years, 7 months	1982
Denis Cregan	Senator	4 May 1940	86 years, 6 months	2002
Proinsias De Rossa	TD / MEP	15 May 1940	86 years, 6 months	2012
Ciarán Murphy	TD	30 May 1940	86 years, 5 months	1982
John McCoy	TD	1 July 1940	86 years, 4 months	1989
Tom Enright	TD / Senator	26 July 1940	86 years, 3 months	2002
John Horgan	TD / Senator / MEP	26 October 1940	86 years	1983
Michael Smith	TD / Senator	8 November 1940	86 years	2007
Brendan Toal	TD	1 December 1940	85 years, 11 months	1977

== Oldest ever office-holders ==
Office holders aged 75 or older:

Name	Office	Age	Year retired
Éamon de Valera	President	Retired aged 90	1973
Michael D. Higgins	President	Retired aged 84	2025
Gerald Boland	Senator	Retired aged 84	1969
Seán MacEntee	TD	Retired aged 80	1969
Maurice Hayes	Senator	Retired aged 80	2007
Charles Fagan	TD	Retired aged 80	1961
David Norris	Senator	Retired aged 79	2024
Jackie Healy-Rae	TD	Retired aged 79	2011
Feargal Quinn	Senator	Retired aged 79	2016
Bernard Durkan	TD	Lost seat aged 79	2024
Pat "the Cope" Gallagher	TD	In office aged 78 years, 8 months	—
James Ryan	Senator	Retired aged 77	1969
Seán T. O'Kelly	President	Retired aged 77	1959
P. J. Sheehan	TD	Retired aged 77	2011
Rory O'Hanlon	TD	Retired aged 77	2011
Séamus Healy	TD	In office aged 76 years, 3 months	—
Paddy Smith	TD	Retired aged 76	1977
Ann Ormonde	Senator	Lost seat aged 76	2011
Labhrás Ó Murchú	Senator	Retired aged 76	2016
Michael Noonan	TD	Retired aged 76	2020
Paul Coghlan	Senator	Retired aged 75	2020
Seán Barrett	TD	Retired aged 75	2020
Michael McDowell	Senator	In office aged 75 years, 6 months	—

== Youngest ever office-holders ==
Name	Office	Age on election	Year elected
William J. Murphy	TD	21y 1m	1949
Joseph Sweeney	TD	21y 6m	1918
Lorcan Allen	TD	21y 6m	1961
Kathleen O'Connor	TD	21y 7m	1956
Ivan Yates	TD	21y 8m	1981
Mary Coughlan	TD	21y 9m	1987
John Bruton	TD	22y 1m	1969
Paddy Smith	TD	22y 2m	1923
Miriam Kearney	Senator	22y 3m	1981
Myra Barry	TD	22y 4m	1979
Síle de Valera	TD	22y 6m	1977
Kathryn Reilly	Senator	22y 7m	2011
James O'Connor	TD	22y 7m	2020
Oliver J. Flanagan	TD	23y 1m	1943
Liam Cosgrave	TD	23y 2m	1943

== Longest surviving cabinet members ==
Government	Members
Brugha (1919)	Richard Mulcahy (died 1971)
De Valera (1919–1921)	Éamon de Valera (died 1975)
De Valera (1921–1922)	Éamon de Valera (died 1975)
Griffith (1922)	Michael Hayes (died 1976)
Collins (1922)	Michael Hayes (died 1976)
Cosgrave (1922)	Ernest Blythe (died 1975)
Cosgrave (1922–1923)	Ernest Blythe (died 1975)
Cosgrave (1923–1927)	Patrick McGilligan (died 1979)
Cosgrave (1927)	Patrick McGilligan (died 1979)
Cosgrave (1927–1930)	Patrick McGilligan (died 1979)
Cosgrave (1930–1932)	Patrick McGilligan (died 1979)
De Valera (1932–1933)	Seán MacEntee (died 1984)
De Valera (1933–1937)	Seán MacEntee (died 1984)
De Valera (1937)	Seán MacEntee (died 1984)
De Valera (1937–1938)	Seán MacEntee (died 1984)
De Valera (1938–1943)	Seán MacEntee (died 1984)
De Valera (1943–1944)	Seán MacEntee (died 1984)
De Valera (1944–1948)	Seán MacEntee (died 1984)
Costello (1948–1951)	Noël Browne (died 1997)
De Valera (1951–1954)	Seán MacEntee (died 1984)
Costello (1954–1957)	Liam Cosgrave (died 2017)
De Valera (1957–1959)	Kevin Boland (died 2001)
Lemass (1959–1961)	Patrick Hillery (died 2008)
Lemass (1961–1965)	Patrick Hillery (died 2008)
Lemass (1965–1966)	Patrick Hillery (died 2008)
Lynch (1966–1969)	Pádraig Faulkner (died 2012)
Lynch (1969–1973)	Gerry Collins (died 2026)
Cosgrave (1973–1977)	Patrick Cooney (died 2025)
Lynch (1977–1979)	Gerry Collins (died 2026)
Haughey (1979–1981)	Ray Burke, Máire Geoghegan-Quinn, Ray MacSharry, Michael Woods
FitzGerald (1981–1982)	Alan Dukes
Haughey (1982)	Ray Burke, Pádraig Flynn, Ray MacSharry, Michael Woods
FitzGerald (1982–1987)	Alan Dukes, Barry Desmond, Michael Noonan, Ruairi Quinn, Dick Spring

== Longest surviving Dáil members ==
Dáil	Election	Members
1st Dáil	1918	Seán MacEntee (died 1984)
2nd Dáil	1921	Tom Maguire (died 1993)
3rd Dáil	1922	Tom Maguire (died 1993)
4th Dáil	1923	Tom Maguire (died 1993)
5th Dáil	1927 (June)	Seán MacEntee (died 1984)
6th Dáil	1927 (Sept)	Seán MacEntee (died 1984)
7th Dáil	1932	James Dillon (died 1986)
8th Dáil	1933	James McGuire (died 1989)
9th Dáil	1937	James Dillon (died 1986)
10th Dáil	1938	James Dillon (died 1986)
11th Dáil	1943	Liam Cosgrave (died 2017)
12th Dáil	1944	Liam Cosgrave (died 2017)
13th Dáil	1948	William J. Murphy (died 2018)
14th Dáil	1951	Liam Cosgrave (died 2017)
15th Dáil	1954	Patrick Byrne (died 2021)
16th Dáil	1957	Brigid Hogan (died 2022)
17th Dáil	1961	Lorcan Allen, John Donnellan
18th Dáil	1965	Lorcan Allen, John Donnellan, Thomas J. Fitzpatrick, Patrick Norton

== Longest lived former office-holders ==
Aged 90 or more at time of death:

Name	Date of birth	Date of death	Age
Philip Brady	10 June 1893	6 January 1995	101 years, 6 months
Eddie Filgate	16 September 1915	19 January 2017	101 years, 4 months
Tom Maguire	28 March 1892	5 July 1993	101 years, 3 months
Tom Fitzpatrick	29 July 1926		100 years, 3 months
T. K. Whitaker	8 December 1916	9 January 2017	100 years, 1 month
Edward MacLysaght	6 November 1887	4 March 1986	98 years, 3 months
Seán Ó Ceallaigh	17 April 1896	15 June 1994	98 years, 1 month
Patrick Norton	1928		97 years, 10 months
Domhnall Ua Buachalla	5 February 1866	30 October 1963	97 years, 8 months
Liam Cosgrave	13 April 1920	4 October 2017	97 years, 5 months
Matthew Stafford	1852	12 June 1950	97 years, 5 months+
Patrick Byrne	2 April 1925	19 October 2021	96 years, 6 months
George Noble Plunkett	3 December 1851	12 March 1948	96 years, 3 months
Séamus Dolan	10 December 1914	10 August 2010	95 years, 8 months
Thomas Finlay	17 September 1922	3 December 2017	95 years, 2 months
John A. Murphy	17 January 1927	28 February 2022	95 years, 1 month
Thomas Westropp Bennett	30 January 1867	1 February 1962	95 years
Jimmy Leonard	5 June 1927	13 April 2022	94 years, 10 months
Patrick Cooney	2 March 1931	6 December 2025	94 years, 9 months
Seán Treacy	23 September 1923	23 March 2018	94 years, 6 months
Gerard Lynch	15 June 1931	20 December 2025	94 years, 6 months
Kathleen Clarke	11 April 1878	29 September 1972	94 years, 5 months
Robert Barton	4 March 1881	10 August 1975	94 years, 5 months
Joseph Farrell	1 July 1905	24 November 1999	94 years, 4 months
Seán MacEntee	22 August 1889	10 January 1984	94 years, 4 months
William McMullen	22 July 1888	12 December 1982	94 years, 4 months
Eileen Lemass	7 July 1932		94 years, 4 months
Pádraig Faulkner	12 March 1918	1 June 2012	94 years, 2 months
Jack Harte	10 December 1920	9 March 2015	94 years, 2 months
Tom O'Donnell	30 August 1926	8 October 2020	94 years, 1 month
Hugh Conaghan	6 May 1926	25 March 2020	93 years, 10 months
Tras Honan	4 January 1930	25 November 2023	93 years, 10 months
Roger Garland	February 1933		93 years, 9 months
Richard Barry	4 September 1919	28 April 2013	93 years, 7 months
Tony Herbert	9 August 1920	6 March 2014	93 years, 6 months
Liam Hyland	23 April 1933		93 years, 6 months
Patrick Finucane	5 December 1890	10 April 1984	93 years, 4 months
Tom Raftery	15 August 1933		93 years, 3 months
Denis Cullen	23 September 1878	26 November 1971	93 years, 2 months
Peadar O'Donnell	22 February 1893	13 May 1986	93 years, 2 months
Donal Creed	7 September 1924	23 November 2017	93 years, 2 months
Sam McAughtry	24 March 1921	28 March 2014	93 years
Kit Ahern	13 January 1915	27 December 2007	92 years, 11 months
Éamon de Valera	14 October 1882	29 August 1975	92 years, 10 months
William Sheldon	18 January 1907	1 November 1999	92 years, 9 months
Jim Corr	25 January 1934	18 November 2026	92 years, 9 months
Charles Fagan	1 October 1881	8 May 1974	92 years, 7 months
Ted Russell	1 April 1912	28 November 2004	92 years, 7 months
Joseph Dowling	2 February 1922	31 May 2014	92 years, 3 months
Rory O'Hanlon	7 February 1934	31 March 2026	92 years, 1 month
Patrick O'Reilly	1911	March 2003	92 years+
Catherine McGuinness	14 November 1934		92 years
Patrick Shanahan	10 March 1908	1 February 2000	91 years, 10 months
Andy O'Brien	21 January 1915	4 December 2006	91 years, 10 months
Kieran Crotty	30 August 1930	22 July 2022	91 years, 10 months
Ann Ormonde	20 January 1935		91 years, 9 months
Eileen Costello	27 June 1870	4 March 1962	91 years, 8 months
Bríd Rodgers	20 February 1935		91 years, 8 months
Brian Mullooly	21 February 1935		91 years, 8 months
John N. Ross	17 May 1920	24 December 2011	91 years, 7 months
Robert Malachy Burke	1 March 1907	20 September 1998	91 years, 6 months
Barry Desmond	15 May 1935		91 years, 6 months
Peter Sands	1 May 1924	17 October 2015	91 years, 5 months
Séamus de Brún	1 October 1911	5 March 2003	91 years, 5 months
Charles McDonald	11 June 1935		91 years, 5 months
Hugh Gibbons	6 July 1916	13 November 2007	91 years, 4 months
Thomas Meaney	11 August 1931	26 December 2022	91 years, 4 months
David Andrews	15 March 1935	27 June 2026	91 years, 3 months
Brendan Griffin	28 August 1935		91 years, 2 months
Jackie Fahey	23 January 1928	18 March 2019	91 years, 1 month
Conor Cruise O'Brien	3 November 1917	18 December 2008	91 years, 1 month
Edward McGuire	28 August 1901	27 October 1992	91 years, 1 month
Richard Conroy	12 September 1933	14 October 2024	91 years, 1 month
Michael Woods	8 December 1935		90 years, 11 months
Bryan Cusack	2 August 1882	24 May 1973	90 years, 9 months
Thomas Johnson	17 May 1872	17 January 1963	90 years, 8 months
Brigid Hogan-O'Higgins	10 March 1932	2 November 2022	90 years, 7 months
Patrick McGilligan	12 April 1889	15 November 1979	90 years, 7 months
Dominick Murphy	1918	1 June 2009	90 years, 5 months+
Maurice Hayes	8 July 1927	23 December 2017	90 years, 5 months
William J. Murphy	17 May 1928	18 September 2018	90 years, 4 months
Camilla Hannon	21 July 1936		90 years, 3 months
Margaret Mary Pearse	24 August 1878	7 November 1968	90 years, 2 months
Michael D'Arcy	7 March 1934	1 May 2024	90 years, 1 month
Richie Ryan	27 February 1929	17 March 2019	90 years
John Griffith	5 October 1848	21 October 1938	90 years
Patrick Lalor	21 July 1926	29 July 2016	90 years

== Shortest lived office-holders ==
Aged 40 or younger at time of death:

Name	Date of birth	Date of death	Age	Cause of death
Kieran Doherty	16 October 1955	2 August 1981	25y	Hunger strike
Liam Mellows	25 May 1895	8 December 1922	27y 6m	Execution during the Irish Civil War
Michael Collins	16 October 1890	22 August 1922	31y 10m	Shot during the Irish Civil War
Don Davern	4 March 1935	2 November 1968	33y 7m	Sudden illness
Michael Derham	1889	20 November 1923	34y 10m-	Sudden illness
Kevin O'Higgins	7 June 1892	10 July 1927	35y 1m	Assassinated by former Civil War opponents
Séamus Dwyer	15 November 1886	20 December 1922	36y 1m	Assassinated during the Irish Civil War
Billy Fox	3 January 1939	12 March 1974	35y 2m	Assassinated during the Troubles
Harry Boland	27 April 1887	31 July 1922	35y 3m	Shot during the Irish Civil War
Frank Carney	25 April 1896	19 October 1932	36y 5m	Ill-health
Pierce McCan	2 August 1882	6 March 1919	36y 7m	Influenza epidemic
Séamus Ryan	6 December 1895	30 June 1933	37y 6m	Sudden illness
Thomas A. Finlay	11 October 1893	22 November 1932	39y 1m	Typhoid fever
A. P. Byrne	12 June 1913	26 July 1952	39y 1m	
Sir Osmond Esmonde	4 April 1896	22 July 1936	40y 3m	Sudden illness
Clement Coughlan	14 August 1942	1 February 1983	40y 5m	Traffic accident

== Longest-serving cabinet ministers (in same office) ==
Name	Office	Years
Seán Lemass	Minister for Industry and Commerce	19 years, 2 months
Éamon de Valera	Minister for External Affairs	15 years, 11 months
Frank Aiken	Minister for External Affairs	15 years, 3 months
James Ryan	Minister for Agriculture	14 years, 10 months
Thomas Derrig	Minister for Education	14 years, 1 month
Gerald Boland	Minister for Justice	11 years, 4 months
Oscar Traynor	Minister for Defence	11 years, 4 months
Seán MacEntee	Minister for Finance	10 years, 5 months

== Shortest-serving cabinet ministers ==
This table lists the shortest periods that a member of government held a particular ministerial office. In some of these cases, the minister held it as well as another ministerial office, being appointed after the resignation of another member of government. Acting Ministers are not listed. Jim McDaid, who was proposed as Minister for Defence on 13 November 1991, but whose name was withdrawn later that day, is not included.

Name	Office	Length	Term of Office		Notes
Bertie Ahern	Minister for Industry and Commerce	8 days	4 January 1993	12 January 1993	Following nomination of Pádraig Flynn as European Commissioner
Brian Cowen	Minister for Energy	11 days	12 January 1993	20 January 1993	Prior to reconfiguration of government departments
Frank Aiken	Minister for Agriculture	11 days	16 November 1957	27 November 1957	Following death of Seán Moylan
Barry Cowen	Minister for Agriculture, Food and the Marine	17 days	27 June 2020	14 July 2020	Sacked as minister
Kevin O'Higgins	Minister for Foreign Affairs	17 days	23 June 1927	10 July 1927	Died in office
Arthur Griffith	Minister for Foreign Affairs	17 days	26 July 1922	12 August 1922	Died in office
Thomas Derrig	Minister for Posts and Telegraphs	19 days	8 September 1939	27 September 1939	
Seán T. O'Kelly	Minister for Education	19 days	8 September 1939	27 September 1939	
Paddy Power	Minister for Trade, Commerce and Tourism	20 days	7 October 1982	27 October 1982	Following resignation of Desmond O'Malley
Erskine Childers	Director of Propaganda	20 days	12 February 1921	8 March 1921	
John Wilson	Minister for Communications	27 days	10 March 1987	31 March 1987	Prior to reconfiguration of government departments
Bertie Ahern	Minister for Arts, Culture and the Gaeltacht	27 days	18 November 1994	15 December 1994	Following resignation of Michael D. Higgins
Charlie McCreevy	Minister for Enterprise and Employment	27 days	18 November 1994	15 December 1994	Following resignation of Ruairi Quinn
Máire Geoghegan-Quinn	Minister for Equality and Law Reform	27 days	18 November 1994	15 December 1994	Following resignation of Mervyn Taylor
Michael Smith	Minister for Education	27 days	18 November 1994	15 December 1994	Following resignation of Niamh Bhreathnach
Michael Woods	Minister for Health	27 days	18 November 1994	15 December 1994	Following resignation of Brendan Howlin
Dara Calleary	Minister for Agriculture, Food and the Marine	38 days	15 July 2020	21 August 2020	Resignation

== People appointed to cabinet at the start of their first term as TD ==
Name	Office	Date
Noël Browne	Minister for Health	February 1948
Kevin Boland	Minister for Defence	March 1957
Martin O'Donoghue	Minister for Economic Planning and Development	July 1977
Alan Dukes	Minister for Agriculture	June 1981
Niamh Bhreathnach	Minister for Education	January 1993
Katherine Zappone	Minister for Children and Youth Affairs	May 2016
Norma Foley	Minister for Education	June 2020
Roderic O'Gorman	Minister for Children, Equality, Disability, Integration and Youth	June 2020

== People appointed as Minister of State at the start of their first term as TD ==
Name	Office (Note: The office was called Parliamentary Secretary until 1978.)	Date
John O'Donovan	Parliamentary Secretary to the Government	June 1954
John M. Kelly	Government Chief Whip; Parliamentary Secretary to the Minister for Defence	March 1973
Mary Flaherty	Minister of State for Poverty and the Family	June 1981
Dick Spring	Minister of State for Law Reform	June 1981
Ted Nealon	Minister of State for Western Development	June 1981
Joan Burton	Minister of State for Poverty	January 1993
Eithne FitzGerald	Minister of State for the National Development Plan	January 1993
Tim O'Malley	Minister of State for Mental Health Services and Food Safety	June 2002
Ciarán Cannon	Minister of State for Training and Skills	March 2011
Alan Kelly	Minister of State for Public and Commuter Transport	March 2011
Seán Canney	Minister of State for the Office of Public Works and Flood Relief	May 2016
Ossian Smyth	Minister of State for Public Procurement and eGovernment	July 2020
Malcolm Noonan	Minister of State for Heritage and Electoral Reform	July 2020

== Senators appointed to cabinet ==
Name	Office	Date	Government
Joseph Connolly	Minister for Posts and Telegraphs	March 1932	6th Exec. Council
Joseph Connolly	Minister for Lands and Fisheries	February 1933	7th Exec. Council
Seán Moylan	Minister for Agriculture	May 1957	8th government
James Dooge	Minister for Foreign Affairs	October 1981	17th government

== Oldest person currently in office ==
Politicians born before 1956:

Name	Office	Date of birth	Age as of 18 November 2026
Pat "the Cope" Gallagher	TD	10 March 1948	78 years, 8 months
Séamus Healy	TD	9 August 1950	76 years, 3 months
Michael McDowell	Senator	1 May 1951	75 years, 6 months
Willie O'Dea	TD	1 November 1952	74 years
Michael Lowry	TD	13 March 1953	73 years, 8 months
Dessie Ellis	TD	23 September 1953	73 years, 1 month
Gerard Craughwell	Senator	22 November 1953	72 years, 11 months
Marian Harkin	TD	26 November 1953	72 years, 11 months
Danny Healy-Rae	TD	16 July 1954	72 years, 4 months
Eamon Scanlon	TD	20 September 1954	72 years, 1 month
John McGuinness	TD	15 March 1955	71 years, 8 months
Joe O'Reilly	Senator	1 April 1955	71 years, 7 months

== Youngest person currently in office ==
Politicians born since 1986:

Name	Office	Date of birth	Age as of 18 November 2026
Eoghan Kenny	TD	February 2000	26 years, 8 months
Albert Dolan	TD	1 December 1998	27 years, 11 months
James O'Connor	TD	20 June 1997	29 years, 4 months
Barry Heneghan	TD	1997	29 years, 10 months
Louis O'Hara	TD	1997	29 years, 10 months
Paul Lawless	TD	1996	30 years, 10 months
Ryan O'Meara	TD	1994	32 years, 10 months
Conor Sheehan	TD	15 June 1993	33 years, 5 months
Claire Kerrane	TD	24 April 1992	34 years, 6 months
Jack Chambers	TD	21 November 1990	35 years, 11 months
Mairéad Farrell	TD	6 January 1990	36 years, 10 months
Eileen Flynn	Senator	1990	36 years, 10 months
Pádraig Rice	TD	1990	36 years, 10 months
Holly Cairns	TD	4 November 1989	37 years
Donnchadh Ó Laoghaire	TD	8 February 1989	37 years, 9 months
John Cummins	TD	29 June 1988	38 years, 4 months
Naoise Ó Cearúil	TD	1988	38 years, 10 months
Eoin Hayes	TD	15 October 1987	39 years, 1 month
Gary Gannon	TD	18 February 1987	39 years, 9 months
Simon Harris	TD	17 October 1986	40 years, 1 month
Helen McEntee	TD	8 June 1986	40 years, 5 months
Aidan Farrelly	TD	1986	40 years, 10 months

== Members of the current government by age ==
Name	Date of birth	Age as of 18 November 2026
Micheál Martin	1 August 1960	66 years, 3 months
Jim O'Callaghan	5 January 1968	58 years, 10 months
Norma Foley	1970	56 years, 10 months
Dara Calleary	10 May 1973	53 years, 6 months
Darragh O'Brien	8 July 1974	52 years, 4 months
James Browne	15 October 1975	51 years, 1 month
James Lawless	19 August 1976	50 years, 2 months
Patrick O'Donovan	21 March 1977	49 years, 7 months
Hildegarde Naughton	1 May 1977	49 years, 6 months
Martin Heydon	9 August 1978	48 years, 3 months
Jennifer Carroll MacNeill	5 September 1980	46 years, 2 months
Peter Burke	22 October 1982	44 years
Helen McEntee	8 June 1986	40 years, 5 months
Simon Harris	17 October 1986	40 years, 1 month
Jack Chambers	21 November 1990	35 years, 11 months

== Longest service (cumulative) ==
Name	Office(s)	Years
Éamon de Valera	TD / President	55
Paddy Smith	TD	54
Frank Aiken	TD	50
James Ryan	TD / Senator	50
Neil Blaney	TD / MEP	47
Michael D. Higgins	Senator / TD / President	47
Gerald Boland	TD / Senator	46

== Married couples/Domestic partners in the same Oireachtas ==
Couple		Oireachtas	Notes (Note: David Cullinane and Kathleen Funchion were both elected to the Dáil in 2016. They had been married from 2007 to 2013.)
Michael O'Higgins	Brigid Hogan-O'Higgins	16th, 17th and 18th Dáil	Married in 1958 when both were members of the 16th Dáil
Alexis FitzGerald Jnr	Mary Flaherty	23rd Dáil and 15th Seanad; 24th Dáil and 17th Seanad	Married couple
Joe McHugh	Olwyn Enright	29th Dáil and 22nd Seanad; 30th Dáil	Married in 2005 when they were a Senator and TD respectively
Paul Bradford	Lucinda Creighton	24th Seanad and 31st Dáil	Married in 2013 when they were a Senator and TD respectively
Martin McAleese	Mary McAleese	24th Seanad and President of Ireland	Married couple
Francis Noel Duffy	Catherine Martin	33rd Dáil	Married couple
Eoin Ó Broin	Lynn Boylan	33rd Dáil and 26th Seanad	Domestic partners
Colm Brophy	Maeve O'Connell	34th Dáil	Married couple

== Members of both the British Parliament and of the Oireachtas ==
This lists those with a separate mandate to the Oireachtas and the Parliament of the United Kingdom, and therefore does not include members of the 1st Dáil.

Name	Parliament of the United Kingdom	Oireachtas
Gerry Adams	MP 1983–1992	TD 2011–2020
Gerry Adams	MP 1997–2011	TD 2011–2020
Dermot Bourke, 7th Earl of Mayo	Peer 1890–1927^{R}	Senator 1922–1927
P. J. Brady	MP 1910–1918	Senator 1927–1928
Alfie Byrne	MP 1915–1918	TD 1922–1928
Alfie Byrne	MP 1915–1918	TD 1932–1956
Alfie Byrne	MP 1915–1918	Senator 1928–1931
James Campbell, later Lord Glenavy	MP 1898–1900	Senator 1922–1928 (Cathaoirleach)
James Campbell, later Lord Glenavy	MP 1903–1917	Senator 1922–1928 (Cathaoirleach)
James Campbell, later Lord Glenavy	Peer 1921–1931^{H}	Senator 1922–1928 (Cathaoirleach)
Bryan Cooper	MP 1910	TD 1923–1930
James Cosgrave	MP 1914–1918	TD 1923–1927
William Duffy	MP 1900–1918	TD 1927
Sir John Esmonde	MP 1915–1918	TD 1937–1944
Sir Thomas Esmonde	MP 1885–1918	Senator 1922–1934
Bernard Forbes, 8th Earl of Granard	Peer 1889–1948^{H}	Senator 1922–1934
Laurence Ginnell	MP 1906–1918	TD 1918–1923
Benjamin Guinness, 3rd Earl of Iveagh	Peer 1967–1992^{H}	Senator 1973–1977 (Nominated by the Taoiseach)
Edward Haughey, later Lord Ballyedmond	Peer 2004–2014^{L}	Senator 1994–2002 (Nominated by the Taoiseach)
Ralph Howard, 7th Earl of Wicklow	Peer 1905–1946^{R}	Senator 1922–1928
Hugh Law	MP 1902–1918	TD 1927–1932
Elisha McCallion	MP 2017–2019	Senator 2020 (Industrial and Commercial Panel)
Seamus Mallon	MP 1986–2005	Senator 1982–1983 (Nominated by the Taoiseach)
James O'Mara	MP 1900–1907	TD 1918–1921
James O'Mara	MP 1900–1907	TD 1924–1927
Stephen O'Mara	MP 1886	Senator 1925–1926
Earl of Kerry, later Marquess of Lansdowne	MP 1908–1918	Senator 1922–1929
Earl of Kerry, later Marquess of Lansdowne	Peer 1927–1936^{H}	Senator 1922–1929
Horace Plunkett	MP 1892–1900	Senator 1922–1923
William Redmond	MP 1910–1922	TD 1923–1932
Geoffrey Taylour, 4th Marquess of Headfort	Peer 1894–1943^{H}	Senator 1922–1928
Windham Wyndham-Quin, 4th Earl of Dunraven and Mount-Earl	Peer 1871–1926^{H}	Senator 1922–1926

Notes:

^{R} Sat as an Irish representative peer under the Act of Union 1800
^{H} Sat as a hereditary peer
^{L} Sat as a life peer

== Diversity records ==
=== Women ===
- First female TD – Constance Markievicz, elected to the First Dáil in 1918
- First female minister – Constance Markievicz was appointed as Minister for Labour in the Ministry of Dáil Éireann from 1919 to 1922
- First female Senators – Eileen Costello, Ellen Cuffe, Alice Stopford Green and Jennie Wyse Power, elected or nominated in 1922
- First female Minister of State – Máire Geoghegan-Quinn was appointed Parliamentary Secretary to the Minister for Industry, Commerce and Energy in 1977 (becoming Minister of State in 1978 when the position was reformed)
- First female cabinet minister since independence – Máire Geoghegan-Quinn was appointed Minister for the Gaeltacht in 1979
- First female party leader in the Dáil – Mary Harney (Progressive Democrats), 1993
- First female President of Ireland – Mary Robinson, who was elected in 1990 and served until 1997
- First female Tánaiste – Mary Harney, appointed in 1997
- First female Leader of the Opposition – Mary Lou McDonald – 2020
- First female Ceann Comhairle – Verona Murphy – 2024

=== Religion ===
- First Jewish Senator – Ellen Cuffe, appointed to the Irish Free State Seanad Éireann as an independent member (1922–1931)
- First Jewish TD – Robert Briscoe, Fianna Fáil TD for Dublin South (1932–1948) and Dublin South-West (1948–1961)
- First openly atheist TD – Jim Kemmy, Democratic Socialist Party/Labour Party TD for Limerick East 1981–1982 and 1987–1997
- First Muslim TD – Moosajee Bhamjee, Labour Party TD for Clare from 1992 to 1997
- First Quaker Senator – James G. Douglas, Independent Senator from 1922 to 1936 and 1938 to 1954

=== LGBT people ===
==== Seanad ====
- First openly gay Oireachtas member – David Norris, independent senator for Dublin University from 1987 to 2024.
- First openly lesbian Oireachtas member – Katherine Zappone, independent senator from 2011 to 2016.
- First member of the Oireachtas in a recognised same-sex relationship – Katherine Zappone, who married Ann Louise Gilligan in British Columbia, Canada in 2003. This was recognised in Irish law as a civil partnership from 2010 and as marriage from 2015.
- First serving member of the Oireachtas to enter into a same-sex marriage – Jerry Buttimer (Fine Gael senator) in December 2017.
- First serving member of the Oireachtas to come out as bisexual – Annie Hoey, (Labour Party senator) in 2020.
- First openly gay Cathaoirleach – Jerry Buttimer from December 2022 to November 2024

==== Dáil ====
- First openly gay TDs – John Lyons (Labour Party TD) and Dominic Hannigan (Labour Party TD), both elected in 2011.
- First serving member of the Oireachtas to come out – Jerry Buttimer (Fine Gael), Senator 2007–2011, 2016–2024, TD 2011–2016 and since 2024, came out in April 2012.
- First openly lesbian TD – Katherine Zappone, Independent TD from 2016 to 2020.
- First openly gay TD elected in a by-election, and first openly gay Fianna Fáil TD – Malcolm Byrne, elected in November 2019, served until February 2020, and again from November 2024.
- First openly gay Social Democrats TD – Cian O'Callaghan, TD since February 2020. Previously first openly gay mayor of a city or county council in Ireland. Mayor of Fingal County Council in 2012.
- First openly gay Green Party TD – Roderic O'Gorman, TD since February 2020.
- First openly gay Independent Ireland TD – Ken O'Flynn, TD since November 2024.
- First openly gay TD to be elected the leader of a political party in Dáil Eireann – Leo Varadkar (leader of Fine Gael from June 2017 to March 2024). (Roderic O'Gorman became the second openly gay TD to be elected leader of a political party in the Dáil when he was elected leader of the Green Party in July 2024).
- First openly gay deputy leader of Fianna Fáil – Jack Chambers, since June 2024.
- First Dáil constituency to elect two openly gay TDs in the same election – Dublin West since February 2020, with Roderic O'Gorman and Leo Varadkar. A third TD for Dublin West, Jack Chambers, came out as gay in January 2024. This made the four-seater Dublin West constituency the first constituency to be represented by a majority of openly gay TDs in the same Dáil.
- First serving TD to enter into a same-sex marriage – Roderic O'Gorman (Green Party TD) in August 2023.

==== Government ====
- First serving cabinet minister to come out – Leo Varadkar (Fine Gael TD), first elected in 2007, became a minister in 2011, came out in 2015. Pat Carey (Fianna Fáil) who was a TD from 1997 to 2011, and served as a minister from 2010 to 2011, came out in 2015 after his retirement.
- First openly lesbian serving cabinet minister – Katherine Zappone, Minister from 2016 to 2020.
- First openly gay Taoiseach – Leo Varadkar (Fine Gael TD), Taoiseach from June 2017 to June 2020.
- First openly gay Tánaiste – Leo Varadkar (Fine Gael TD), Tánaiste from June 2020 to December 2022.
- First constituency to have two openly gay cabinet ministers – Dublin West from 2020 to 2024; Leo Varadkar and Roderic O'Gorman, and again from June 2024 to January 2025, Jack Chambers and Roderic O'Gorman.
- First serving cabinet minister to enter into a same-sex marriage – Roderic O'Gorman (Green Party TD) in August 2023.

=== Ethnic minorities ===
- First Indian South African/Irish of Indian descent in the Oireachtas – Moosajee Bhamjee, Labour TD for Clare 1992–1997.
- First Irish of Indian descent to be a government minister (2011), Taoiseach (2017–2020, 2022–2024) and Tánaiste (2020–2022) – Leo Varadkar, Fine Gael TD elected in 2007 for Dublin West.
- First Irish of Czech descent member of the Oireachtas – Ivana Bacik, elected to the Seanad in 2007 for the Labour Party.
- First person of Traveller descent member of the Oireachtas – Pádraig Mac Lochlainn, Sinn Féin TD elected to the Dáil in 2011 for Donegal.
- First Traveller member of the Oireachtas – Eileen Flynn, appointed to the Seanad in 2020.

== Party leaders ==
Party leaders serving 10 years or more:

Leader	Tenure	Party	Period	Constituency
Éamon de Valera	42y	Sinn Féin	1917–1926	East Clare; Clare
Éamon de Valera	42y	Fianna Fáil	1926–1959	East Clare; Clare
Ruairí Ó Brádaigh	39y	Sinn Féin	1970–1983	Longford–Westmeath
Ruairí Ó Brádaigh	39y	Republican Sinn Féin	1986–2009	Longford–Westmeath
Gerry Adams	35y	Sinn Féin	1983–2018	Belfast West; Louth
William Norton	28y	Labour	1932–1960	Kildare
Tomás Mac Giolla	26y	Sinn Féin	1962–1970	Dublin West
Tomás Mac Giolla	26y	Sinn Féin	1970–1977	Dublin West
Tomás Mac Giolla	26y	Sinn Féin The Workers' Party	1977–1982	Dublin West
Tomás Mac Giolla	26y	Workers' Party	1982–1988	Dublin West
Joseph Blowick	21y	Clann na Talmhan	1944–1965	Mayo South
W. T. Cosgrave	20y	Cumann na nGaedheal	1923–1933	Kilkenny City; North Kilkenny; Carlow–Kilkenny; Cork Borough
W. T. Cosgrave	20y	Fine Gael	1934–1944	Kilkenny City; North Kilkenny; Carlow–Kilkenny; Cork Borough
Seán MacBride	19y	Clann na Poblachta	1946–1965	Dublin County
John Redmond	18y	Irish Parliamentary	1900–1918	Waterford City
Brendan Corish	17y	Labour	1960–1977	Wexford
Micheál Martin	15y	Fianna Fáil	2011–present	Cork South-Central
Richard Mulcahy	15y	Fine Gael	1944–1959 (Note: While Mulcahy was a member of the Seanad in 1944, Tom O'Higgins acted as parliamentary party leader.) (Note: Between 1948 and 1959, John A. Costello served as parliamentary leader.)	Tipperary
Dick Spring	15y	Labour	1982–1997	Kerry North
Enda Kenny	15y	Fine Gael	2002–2017	Mayo West; Mayo
Mary Harney	14y	Progressive Democrats	1993–2006; 2007–2008	Dublin South-West; Dublin Mid-West
Bertie Ahern	13y	Fianna Fáil	1994–2008	Dublin Finglas; Dublin Central
Jack Lynch	13y	Fianna Fáil	1966–1979	Cork City
Charles Haughey	13y	Fianna Fáil	1979–1992	Dublin North-Central
Margaret Buckley	13y	Sinn Féin	1937–1950	None
Eamon Ryan	13y	Green	2011–2024	Dublin Bay South
Liam Cosgrave	12y	Fine Gael	1965–1977	Dún Laoghaire
John Bruton	11y	Fine Gael	1990–2001	Meath
Garret FitzGerald	10y	Fine Gael	1977–1987	Dublin South-East

== See also ==
- Families in the Oireachtas
- Father of the Dáil
- List of female cabinet ministers of the Republic of Ireland
- List of female members of Dáil Éireann
- List of female members of Seanad Éireann
- List of first women holders of political offices in Ireland
- List of Irish politicians
- List of Irish politicians who changed party affiliation
- List of members of Dáil Éireann who died in office
- List of members of Seanad Éireann who died in office
- List of members of the Oireachtas imprisoned during the Irish revolutionary period
- List of members of the Oireachtas imprisoned since 1923
- Records of Irish heads of government since 1922
