= Davern =

Davern is both a surname and a given name. Notable people with the name include:

Surname:

- Brett Davern (born 1992), American actor
- Don Davern (1935–1968), Irish politician
- Kenny Davern (1935–2006), American jazz clarinetist
- Michael Davern (1900–1973), Irish politician
- Noel Davern (1945–2013), Irish politician

Given name:

- Davern Williams (born 1980), American football player

== See also ==
- Davern Nunatak, nunatak of Mac. Robertson Land, Antarctica
