= List of imprisoned members of the Oireachtas =

List of imprisoned members of the Oireachtas may refer to:

- List of members of the Oireachtas imprisoned during the Irish revolutionary period (1916–23)
- List of members of the Oireachtas imprisoned since 1923
