= List of members of the Oireachtas imprisoned since 1923 =

This is a list of members of the Oireachtas (National Parliament of Ireland) who served a prison sentence or were interned since 1923 in any jurisdiction before, during or after their time as a Teachta Dála (TD) or Senator.

Name	Party	Term of office		Prison time	Prison(s)	Reason	Notes
Henry Coyle	Cumann na nGaedheal	1923	May 1924	1924–27	?	Fraud (Bouncing cheques)	Disqualified from the Oireachtas as a result
Seán McGuinness	Republican	1923	October 1925	1925–26	Mountjoy	Assaulting a Garda Sergeant	Disqualified from the Oireachtas as a result
Dominick Cafferky	Clann na Talmhan	1943	1954	early 1940s	Sligo Gaol	1940s land agitation in Mayo	Later became a leading Dáil spokesman on penal reform
Bernard Commons	Clann na Talmhan	Dec 1945	1957	early 1940s	Sligo Gaol	1940s land agitation in Mayo	
James Larkin	Labour Party	1927	1944	1940s	?	Bankruptcy	
John Joe McGirl	Sinn Féin	1957	1961	1946	?	IRA membership	
John Joe McGirl	Sinn Féin	1957	1961	1957–62	Mountjoy	Actions during the IRA Border Campaign	
Tomás Mac Giolla	Workers' Party	Nov 1982	1992	1956–62	Mountjoy	IRA membership and actions during the IRA Border Campaign	
Proinsias De Rossa	Sinn Féin, Workers' Party, Democratic Left, Labour Party	Feb 1982	2002	1956–59	Mountjoy, Curragh Camp	IRA membership and actions during the IRA Border Campaign	
Bernard Durkan	Fine Gael	1981		1967	Mountjoy, Portlaoise	Contempt of Court for activities relating to a farmers protest	
Ruairí Ó Brádaigh	Sinn Féin, Republican Sinn Féin	1957	1961	Jan–Jun 1957	Mountjoy	Failing to account for his activities and actions during the IRA Border Campaign	
Ruairí Ó Brádaigh	Sinn Féin, Republican Sinn Féin	1957	1961	Jun 1957–Sep 1958	Curragh Camp	Interned	Escaped in September 1958
Ruairí Ó Brádaigh	Sinn Féin, Republican Sinn Féin	1957	1961	Nov 1959–May 1960	Mountjoy	Imprisoned under the Offences against the State Act	
Ruairí Ó Brádaigh	Sinn Féin, Republican Sinn Féin	1957	1961	Jan–Jun 1973	Curragh Camp	Membership of the Provisional IRA	
Gerry Adams	Sinn Féin	2011	2020	1972, 1973–76	HMS Maidstone, Long Kesh	Membership of the Provisional IRA	Interned, but imprisoned for attempted escape
Paddy Agnew	Anti H-Block	1981	1982	1973–76, 1977–86	Portlaoise, Mountjoy, Crumlin Road, Maze	Illegal importation of arms on behalf of the Provisional IRA and membership of same	Elected to Dáil Éireann at the 1981 general election while in prison
Kieran Doherty	Anti H-Block	Jun 1981	Aug 1981	1976–81	Maze	Possession of firearms and explosives, and hijacking	Died on hunger strike in August 1981
Martin Ferris	Sinn Féin	2002	2020	1984–94	Portlaoise	Illegal importation of arms on behalf of the Provisional IRA and membership of the same	
Dessie Ellis	Sinn Féin	2011		1982–90	Portlaoise	Provisional IRA membership	
Tony Gregory	Independent	Feb 1982	Jan 2009	1986	Mountjoy	For activities during a campaign in support of Dublin inner city street traders	Spent 2 weeks in prison
Joe Costello	Labour	Nov 1982	Feb 2016	1986	Mountjoy	For activities during a campaign in support of Dublin inner city street traders	Spent one week in prison
Luke 'Ming' Flanagan	Independent	2011	2014	1998	Loughan House	Non payment of fines related to the Litter Pollution Act	Spent 3 weeks in prison
Liam Lawlor	Fianna Fáil	1977	2002	Jan 2001, Jan 2002, Feb 2002	Mountjoy	Failure to cooperate with the Mahon Tribunal	
Joe Higgins	Socialist Party	1997	2016	Sep–Oct 2003	Mountjoy	Actions during the Anti-Bin Tax Campaign	
Clare Daly	Socialist Party	2011	2019	Sep–Oct 2003	Mountjoy	Actions during the Anti-Bin Tax Campaign	
Clare Daly	United Left	2011	2019	7–9 pm, 9 December 2015	Limerick Prison	Non-payment of fines	Fined €2,000 on 22 April 2015 for entering a restricted area at Shannon Airport on 22 July 2014 when protesting against U.S. Air Force landings. Sentenced to 30 days' imprisonment.
Ray Burke	Fianna Fáil	1973	1998	Jan–Jun 2005	Arbour Hill	Falsifying tax returns	Mahon Tribunal stated that Burke was unambiguously "corrupt"
Francis O'Brien	Fianna Fáil	1989	2011	2013–15	Castlerea Prison	Demanding money with menaces	
Ned O'Keeffe	Fianna Fáil	1982	2011	2014	–	Falsifying expense claims	7-month suspended sentence
Ivor Callely	Fianna Fáil	1989	2011	2014–15	Wheatfield Prison	Falsifying expense claims	5 months
Mick Wallace	Independent	2011	2019	2–4 pm, 9 December 2015	Limerick Prison	Non-payment of fines	Same crimes and sentence as Clare Daly.
James Heffernan	Labour Party	2011	April 2016	April–July 2019	Cork Prison	Drunken assault on three gardaí	
James Heffernan	Social Democrats	2011	April 2016	April–July 2019	Cork Prison	Drunken assault on three gardaí	

== See also ==
- List of members of the Oireachtas imprisoned during the Irish revolutionary period (1916–1923)
- Records of members of the Oireachtas
