= Father of the Dáil =

In Ireland, the term Father of the Dáil (Irish: Athair na Dála) is an unofficial title applied to the current member of Dáil Éireann with the longest unbroken period of service in the Dail, regardless of their position. The 'Father' has no official role in the business of the House as the title is honorific.

On a number of occasions two or more men have shared the position of Father of the Dáil; there has never been a female holder of the title. However, the term "Mother of the Dáil" is used on occasion to refer to the current female member of Dáil Éireann with the longest unbroken period of service.

James Everett was joint Father of the Dáil at his death in 1967. Oliver J. Flanagan's death occurred two months after his retirement in 1987. Neil Blaney's death in 1995 occurred while he was Father of the Dáil.

The current Father of the Dáil is Willie O'Dea who was first elected to the Dáil at the February 1982 general election, while the current Mother of the Dáil is Mary Lou McDonald who was first elected at the 2011 general election.

== Fathers of the Dáil ==
Name	Entered Dáil	Became Father	Left Dáil	Party
Frank Fahy	1918 election	4 February 1948	12 July 1953	Fianna Fáil
Éamon de Valera	1918 election	4 February 1948	23 June 1959	Fianna Fáil
Gerald Boland	1923 election	23 June 1959	4 October 1961	Fianna Fáil
James Ryan	1923 election	23 June 1959	7 April 1965	Fianna Fáil
Patrick McGilligan	1923 election	23 June 1959	7 April 1965	Fine Gael
James Everett	1923 election	23 June 1959	18 December 1967	Labour
Thomas McEllistrim	1923 election	23 June 1959	18 June 1969	Fianna Fáil
Frank Aiken	1923 election	23 June 1959	28 February 1973	Fianna Fáil
Paddy Smith	1923 election	23 June 1959	5 July 1977	Fianna Fáil
Liam Cosgrave	1943 election	5 July 1977	11 June 1981	Fine Gael
Dan Spring	1943 election	5 July 1977	11 June 1981	Labour
Oliver J. Flanagan	1943 election	5 July 1977	17 February 1987	Fine Gael
Neil Blaney	Dec. 1948 by-election	17 February 1987	8 November 1995	Independent Fianna Fáil
Paddy Harte	1961 election	8 November 1995	6 June 1997	Fine Gael
Seán Treacy	1961 election	8 November 1995	6 June 1997	Labour
Séamus Pattison	1961 election	8 November 1995	14 June 2007	Labour
Enda Kenny	Nov. 1975 by-election	14 June 2007	14 January 2020	Fine Gael
Richard Bruton	Feb. 1982 election	14 January 2020	8 November 2024	Fine Gael
Willie O'Dea	Feb. 1982 election	14 January 2020	Incumbent	Fianna Fáil

== Mothers of the Dáil ==
Name	Entered Dáil	Became Mother	Left Dáil	Party
Constance Markievicz	1918 election	14 December 1918	15 July 1927	Sinn Féin
Constance Markievicz	1918 election	14 December 1918	15 July 1927	Fianna Fáil
Caitlín Brugha	1923 election	15 July 1927	15 September 1927	Sinn Féin
Margaret Collins-O'Driscoll	1923 election	15 July 1927	24 January 1933	Cumann na nGaedheal
Helena Concannon	1933 election	24 January 1933	1 July 1937	Fianna Fáil
Margaret Mary Pearse	1933 election	24 January 1933	1 July 1937	Fianna Fáil
Bridget Redmond	1933 election	24 January 1933	3 May 1952	Cumann na nGaedheal
Bridget Redmond	1933 election	24 January 1933	3 May 1952	Fine Gael
Mary Reynolds (Note: Mary Reynolds was first elected to Dáil Éireann at the 1932 election but subsequently lost her seat at the 1933 election, therefore her continuous time as a TD is measured from 1937, when she regained her seat.)	1932 election	3 May 1952	4 October 1961	Cumann na nGaedheal
Mary Reynolds	1932 election	3 May 1952	4 October 1961	Fine Gael
Honor Crowley	Dec. 1945 by-election	4 October 1961	18 October 1966	Fianna Fáil
Celia Lynch	1954 election	18 October 1966	6 June 1977	Fianna Fáil
Joan Burke	Jul. 1964 by-election	6 June 1977	11 June 1981	Fine Gael
Máire Geoghegan-Quinn	Mar. 1975 by-election	11 June 1981	6 June 1997	Fine Gael
Mary Harney	1981 election	6 June 1997	25 February 2011	Fianna Fáil
Mary Harney	1981 election	6 June 1997	25 February 2011	Progressive Democrats
Mary Harney	1981 election	6 June 1997	25 February 2011	Independent
Róisín Shortall	1992 election	25 February 2011	29 November 2024	Labour
Róisín Shortall	1992 election	25 February 2011	29 November 2024	Independent
Róisín Shortall	1992 election	25 February 2011	29 November 2024	Social Democrats
Mary Lou McDonald	2011 election	29 November 2024	Incumbent	Sinn Féin

== See also ==
- Father of the House
- Baby of the Dáil
- Records of members of the Oireachtas
