= Patrick Smith (politician) =

Irish politician (1901–1982)

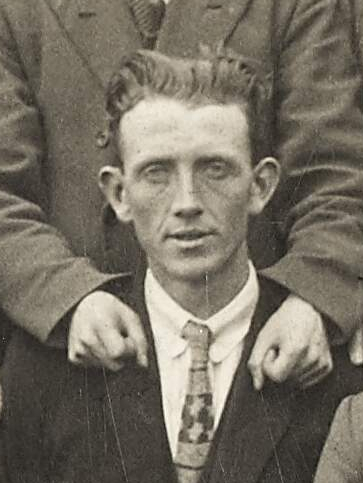
- Smith in 1927

Minister for Agriculture
- In office 27 November 1957 – 8 October 1964
- Taoiseach: Éamon de Valera; Seán Lemass
- Preceded by: Frank Aiken
- Succeeded by: Charles Haughey
- In office 21 January 1947 – 18 February 1948
- Taoiseach: Éamon de Valera
- Preceded by: James Ryan
- Succeeded by: James Dillon

Minister for Social Welfare
- In office 20 March 1957 – 27 November 1957
- Taoiseach: Éamon de Valera; Seán Lemass
- Preceded by: Brendan Corish
- Succeeded by: Seán MacEntee

Minister for Local Government
- In office 20 March 1957 – 27 November 1957
- Taoiseach: Éamon de Valera; Seán Lemass
- Preceded by: Patrick O'Donnell
- Succeeded by: Neil Blaney
- In office 13 June 1951 – 2 June 1954
- Taoiseach: Éamon de Valera
- Preceded by: Michael Keyes
- Succeeded by: Patrick O'Donnell

Parliamentary Secretary
- 1947: Agriculture
- 1943–1946: Finance
- 1939–1943: Government Chief Whip

Teachta Dála
- In office August 1923 – June 1977
- Constituency: Cavan

Personal details
- Born: 17 July 1901 Bailieboro, County Cavan, Ireland
- Died: 18 March 1982 (aged 80) Castleblaney, County Monaghan, Ireland
- Party: Fianna Fáil
- Spouse: Mary Theresa Ward (m. 1936)
- Children: 6
- Relatives: Niamh Smyth (grand-niece)

Patrick Smith (17 July 1901 – 18 March 1982) was an Irish Fianna Fáil politician, who served as a Teachta Dála (TD) from 1923 until 1977, a tenure of 53 years, and the longest in the state. He held a number of ministerial positions within the governments of Éamon de Valera and Seán Lemass.

== Early life ==
Smith was born on 17 July 1901 in the town of Bailieborough, County Cavan, the eighth and youngest child of Terence Smith, a farmer, and Ellen Smith (née MacManus).

He joined the Irish Republican Brotherhood (IRB), and he played a small role in the Easter Rising of 1916. By 1920, he was involved with the Irish Republican Army (IRA) and was one of its youngest commandants, at the age of 19. He was captured by British forces in 1921, along with Seán Moylan, who would go on to become a government colleague. He was interned, put on trial for treason but he was spared after a truce was called between the British Army and the IRA during the Irish War of Independence.

After the signing of the Anglo-Irish Treaty, Smith sided with Éamon de Valera and the Anti-Treaty side during the Irish Civil War. Smith had felt that the Irish negotiators did not test the British delegation enough; this sentiment would last with him well into his political career, Smith being said to have shouted across the floor of Dáil Éireann, "They gave us stepping-stones, but they [state forces in 1922] would not walk on them" (a quote from Irish revolutionary leader Michael Collins).

== Political career ==
Smith entered the Dáil in September 1923, as a Republican candidate. In 1926, Éamon de Valera, the Leader of Anti-Treaty Sinn Fein party, approached Smith and persuaded him to join his newly-founded political party, Fianna Fáil. Fianna Fáil abandoned the abstentionist policy of Anti-Treaty Sinn Fein and its elected members took their seats in Dáil Éireann. De Valera and Smith had a strong personal and professional relationship; Smith had a strong loyalty for Fianna Fáil and by extension, de Valera, whom he often defended from allegations of totalitarian-style policies. Smith rebutted these criticisms, saying that he felt de Valera had always given a voice to members of the party. He worked as Parliamentary Secretary at the Department of the Taoiseach (Government Chief Whip). Smith identified this time during World War II as his most fulfilling period in Irish politics.

He was appointed as Parliamentary Secretary to the Minister for Finance in 1943. He served under Seán T. O'Kelly and Frank Aiken during his tenure in the department. He was briefly Parliamentary Secretary to the Minister for Agriculture in January 1947, before his appointment as Minister for Agriculture later that month during which time he oversaw the introduction of legislation on arterial drainage. He held this position until the collapse of the Fianna Fáil government which had been in power for nearly 16 years. The party was in opposition until the 1951 Irish general election. Smith was then appointed as Minister for Local Government. Smith focused on many social issues, especially the tuberculosis issue in Ireland. He advocated for the reduction of overcrowding in the slums of Dublin. He also oversaw the doubling of the car license fee to ensure the government had enough cashflow for the upkeep of urban and rural roads. The improvement of roads also facilitated unemployment programs by offering recruitment opportunities to work on the roads. The fund for road improvement soon amounted to £3 million, and work began on surfacing the 34,000 miles of road which remained below standard. The Fianna Fáil government collapsed in 1954 and was replaced by the Second Inter-Party Government, led by John A. Costello; Smith returned to the position of Minister for Local Government when Fianna Fáil were re-elected at the 1957 Irish general election.

Smith was appointed again as Minister for Agriculture in 1957 when Fianna Fáil returned to government. His main objectives while in this office were to eliminate tuberculosis in cattle, which proved to be a serious issue for Irish farmers at the time. He also encouraged greater productivity from the primary economic sector, specifically farming and also aimed to improve grassland quality across the island. Outside of agriculture, Smith continued to serve as Minister for Local Government. He also was part of a group of ministers who supervised the First Programme for Economic Expansion, an economic development plan by T. K. Whitaker, Secretary at the Department of Finance, that has been heavily praised as the programme that helped kickstart Ireland's economic growth which would take full form in the mid-1990s. He also had a spell as Minister for Social Welfare.

Smith continued to serve under Seán Lemass, but became disillusioned with the taoiseach about the direction of his economic policy. Smith felt Lemass was too easily influenced by trade unions and in protest he resigned from all his ministerial positions in 1964. On that same day, Lemass appointed his Parliamentary Secretary, Charles Haughey, as Minister for Agriculture in his place. As Lemass predicted, the media focused on the new appointment rather than the resignation. It is a point, however, that Seán MacEntee tendered several resignation letters to de Valera during the course of his ministerial career which were not enacted but were dealt with among the cabinet of the day. It is possible that Smith may have felt that he was challenging Lemass with his resignation but he enacted it and he remained in the parliamentary party which he had founded. Accordingly Smith was not appointed to cabinet by Jack Lynch upon his succession as Taoiseach in 1966 and would spend the remainder of his parliamentary career on the Fianna Fáil backbenches. During the Arms Crisis, together with Aiken and almost all of the founding members of Fianna Fáil, Smith sided with Lynch against Charles Haughey and Neil Blaney

Smith retired from politics in 1977 at the age of 75. At the time of his retirement from the Dáil his record of 54 unbroken years of service for his constituents has been unsurpassed by any TD before or since.

== Death ==
Smith died on 18 March 1982, aged 80, at his home in Castleblayney, County Monaghan. He was survived by his wife, Mary Ward and his six children. His body was returned to his ancestral parish of Knockbride, a townland outside of Bailieborough, County Cavan. He was buried in West Knockbride Chapel, with his graveside oration given by Charles Haughey, who had been appointed taoiseach a number of days earlier.

Political offices
Preceded by Patrick Little	Government Chief Whip; 1939–1943	Succeeded by Eamon Kissane
Preceded by Seán Moylan	Parliamentary Secretary to the Minister for Finance; 1943–1946	Succeeded by Seán O'Grady
New office	Parliamentary Secretary to the Minister for Agriculture; Jan. 1947	Office abolished
Preceded by James Ryan	Minister for Agriculture; 1947–1948	Succeeded by James Dillon
Preceded by Michael Keyes	Minister for Local Government; 1951–1954	Succeeded by Patrick O'Donnell
Preceded by Patrick O'Donnell	Minister for Local Government; Mar–Nov 1957	Succeeded by Neil Blaney
Preceded by Brendan Corish	Minister for Social Welfare; Mar–Nov 1957	Succeeded by Seán MacEntee
Preceded by Frank Aiken	Minister for Agriculture; 1957–1964	Succeeded by Charles Haughey
Honorary titles
Preceded by Frank Aiken	Father of the Dáil; 1973–1977	Succeeded by Liam Cosgrave

Dáil	Election	Deputy (Party)	Deputy (Party)	Deputy (Party)	Deputy (Party)
2nd	1921	Arthur Griffith (SF)	Paul Galligan (SF)	Seán Milroy (SF)	3 seats 1921–1923
3rd	1922	Arthur Griffith (PT-SF)	Walter L. Cole (PT-SF)	Seán Milroy (PT-SF)	3 seats 1921–1923
4th	1923	Patrick Smith (Rep)	John James Cole (Ind.)	Seán Milroy (CnaG)	Patrick Baxter (FP)
4th	1925 by-election	Patrick Smith (Rep)	John James Cole (Ind.)	John Joe O'Reilly (CnaG)	Patrick Baxter (FP)
5th	1927 (Jun)	Patrick Smith (FF)	John O'Hanlon (Ind.)	John Joe O'Reilly (CnaG)	Patrick Baxter (FP)
6th	1927 (Sep)	Patrick Smith (FF)	John O'Hanlon (Ind.)	John Joe O'Reilly (CnaG)	John James Cole (Ind.)
7th	1932	Patrick Smith (FF)	John O'Hanlon (Ind.)	John Joe O'Reilly (CnaG)	Michael Sheridan (FF)
8th	1933	Patrick Smith (FF)	Patrick McGovern (NCP)	John Joe O'Reilly (CnaG)	Michael Sheridan (FF)
9th	1937	Patrick Smith (FF)	Patrick McGovern (FG)	John James Cole (Ind.)	Michael Sheridan (FF)
10th	1938	Patrick Smith (FF)	Patrick McGovern (FG)	John James Cole (Ind.)	Michael Sheridan (FF)
11th	1943	Patrick Smith (FF)	Patrick O'Reilly (CnaT)	John James Cole (Ind.)	Michael Sheridan (FF)
12th	1944	Patrick Smith (FF)	Patrick O'Reilly (CnaT)	Tom O'Reilly (Ind.)	Michael Sheridan (FF)
13th	1948	Patrick Smith (FF)	John Tully (CnaP)	Patrick O'Reilly (Ind.)	Michael Sheridan (FF)
14th	1951	Patrick Smith (FF)	John Tully (CnaP)	Patrick O'Reilly (FG)	Michael Sheridan (FF)
15th	1954	Patrick Smith (FF)	John Tully (CnaP)	Patrick O'Reilly (FG)	Michael Sheridan (FF)
16th	1957	Patrick Smith (FF)	John Tully (CnaP)	Patrick O'Reilly (FG)	Michael Sheridan (FF)
17th	1961	Patrick Smith (FF)	Séamus Dolan (FF)	Patrick O'Reilly (FG)	3 seats 1961–1977
18th	1965	Patrick Smith (FF)	John Tully (CnaP)	Tom Fitzpatrick (FG)	3 seats 1961–1977
19th	1969	Patrick Smith (FF)	Patrick O'Reilly (FG)	Tom Fitzpatrick (FG)	3 seats 1961–1977
20th	1973	Patrick Smith (FF)	John Wilson (FF)	Tom Fitzpatrick (FG)	3 seats 1961–1977
21st	1977	Constituency abolished. See Cavan–Monaghan			
