= Ned O'Keeffe =

Irish former politician (born 1942)

Minister of State
- 1999–2001: Agriculture, Food and Rural Development
- 1997–1999: Agriculture and Food

Teachta Dála
- In office November 1982 – February 2011
- Constituency: Cork East

Senator
- In office 13 May 1982 – 24 November 1982
- Constituency: Nominated by the Taoiseach

Personal details
- Born: Edward O'Keeffe; 1 August 1942 (age 84) County Cork, Ireland
- Party: Fianna Fáil
- Spouse: Anna Buckley (m. 1965; died 2017)
- Children: 5, including Kevin
- Education: University College Cork

Ned O'Keeffe (born 1 August 1942) is an Irish former Fianna Fáil politician who served as a Minister of State from 1997 to 2001. He served as a Teachta Dála (TD) for the Cork East constituency from 1982 to 2011. He was a Senator from May 1982 to November 1982, after being nominated by the Taoiseach.

== Early life ==
O'Keeffe was born in Mitchelstown, County Cork in 1942. He was educated at Darra College, Clonakilty, where he received a diploma in Social and Rural Science. O'Keeffe was a pig farmer before becoming involved in politics.

== Political career ==
Prior to electoral politics, O'Keeffe served as chairman of the County Cork Irish Farmers' Association executive.

In 1982, he was nominated by the Taoiseach, Charles Haughey, to the 16th Seanad. He was first elected to the Dáil at the November 1982 general election for Cork East. He retained his seat at each general election until his retirement in 2011. He was also a member of Cork County Council for the local electoral area of Mallow from 1985 to 1997.

O'Keeffe served in a number of frontbench positions. He was Fianna Fáil Spokesperson on Industry from 1982 until 1987. While Fianna Fáil was in government between 1987 and 1994, O'Keeffe remained on the backbenches.

Following an incident with RTÉ political correspondent Una Claffey in the Dáil bar in 1991, O'Keeffe apologised and said he had no option to resign but was persuaded to stay in order to prevent the government losing its majority.

When Bertie Ahern became party leader in 1994, O'Keeffe was appointed deputy Spokesperson on Enterprise and Employment, with responsibility for Commerce, Science, Technology and Small Business. After the 1997 general election, he was appointed as Minister of State at the Department of Agriculture and Food with responsibility for Food. He resigned as a minister of state in February 2001 after it emerged that he had voted on a Dáil motion without declaring that he had a beneficial interest in the subject matter.

On 28 November 2007, O'Keeffe resigned the Fianna Fáil party whip as he refused to support a motion of confidence in the Minister for Health and Children Mary Harney. On 26 February 2008, he was re-admitted to the Fianna Fáil parliamentary party.

He was an unsuccessful candidate at the 2009 European Parliament election for the South constituency. In the pre-election debate on Today FM he voiced his support for the use of nuclear power and an incinerator in Cork Harbour. He retired from politics at the 2011 general election.

== Arrest ==
He was arrested on 27 April 2012, by members of the Garda Bureau of Fraud Investigation (GBFI) on suspicion of using a false invoice to claim for mobile phone expenses while he was a member of the Oireachtas. He was held for a number of hours at Cobh Garda station under section 26 of the Criminal Justice (Theft and Fraud Offences) Act 2001.

On the 1 December 2014, O'Keeffe was found guilty of fraudulently claiming in excess of €3,700 in mobile phone usage expenses. He was fined €3,500 and given a seven month suspended prison sentence for his crime.

== Family ==
O'Keeffe's son, Kevin, was a member of Cork County Council and was an unsuccessful candidate at the 2011 general election. Both Kevin and his other son, Ciarán, a solicitor based in Mitchelstown, sought to be added to the Fianna Fáil party ticket for Cork East in 2015. However, Ciarán later withdrew his attempt. News that they were going head to head surprised party supporters in the constituency and it was seen in some quarters as being a potentially divisive battle which could have undermined the party. Kevin O’Keeffe was elected to Dáil Éireann in the 2016 general election, but lost his seat at the 2020 general election.

His wife, Anna O'Keeffe, died in 2017.

Political offices
Preceded by Jimmy Deenihan	Minister of State at the Department of Agriculture and Food (Agriculture, Food and Rural Development from 1999); 1997–2001; With: Noel Davern	Succeeded by Éamon Ó Cuív; Noel Davern

Dáil	Election	Deputy (Party)	Deputy (Party)	Deputy (Party)	Deputy (Party)	Deputy (Party)
4th	1923	John Daly (Ind.)	Michael Hennessy (CnaG)	David Kent (Rep)	John Dinneen (FP)	Thomas O'Mahony (CnaG)
4th	1924 by-election	John Daly (Ind.)	Michael Hennessy (CnaG)	David Kent (Rep)	John Dinneen (FP)	Michael K. Noonan (CnaG)
5th	1927 (Jun)	John Daly (Ind.)	Michael Hennessy (CnaG)	David Kent (SF)	David O'Gorman (FP)	Martin Corry (FF)
6th	1927 (Sep)	John Daly (CnaG)	Michael Hennessy (CnaG)	William Kent (FF)	Edmond Carey (CnaG)	Martin Corry (FF)
7th	1932	John Daly (CnaG)	William Broderick (CnaG)	Brook Brasier (Ind.)	Patrick Murphy (FF)	Martin Corry (FF)
8th	1933	Patrick Daly (CnaG)	William Broderick (CnaG)	William Kent (NCP)	Patrick Murphy (FF)	Martin Corry (FF)
9th	1937	Constituency abolished				

Dáil	Election	Deputy (Party)	Deputy (Party)	Deputy (Party)
13th	1948	Martin Corry (FF)	Patrick O'Gorman (FG)	Seán Keane (Lab)
14th	1951	Martin Corry (FF)	Patrick O'Gorman (FG)	Seán Keane (Lab)
14th	1953 by-election	Martin Corry (FF)	Patrick O'Gorman (FG)	Richard Barry (FG)
15th	1954	Martin Corry (FF)	John Moher (FF)	Richard Barry (FG)
16th	1957	Martin Corry (FF)	John Moher (FF)	Richard Barry (FG)
17th	1961	Constituency abolished		

Dáil	Election	Deputy (Party)	Deputy (Party)	Deputy (Party)	Deputy (Party)
22nd	1981	Carey Joyce (FF)	Myra Barry (FG)	Patrick Hegarty (FG)	Joe Sherlock (SF–WP)
23rd	1982 (Feb)	Michael Ahern (FF)	Myra Barry (FG)	Patrick Hegarty (FG)	Joe Sherlock (SF–WP)
24th	1982 (Nov)	Michael Ahern (FF)	Myra Barry (FG)	Patrick Hegarty (FG)	Ned O'Keeffe (FF)
25th	1987	Michael Ahern (FF)	Joe Sherlock (WP)	Patrick Hegarty (FG)	Ned O'Keeffe (FF)
26th	1989	Michael Ahern (FF)	Joe Sherlock (WP)	Paul Bradford (FG)	Ned O'Keeffe (FF)
27th	1992	Michael Ahern (FF)	John Mulvihill (Lab)	Paul Bradford (FG)	Ned O'Keeffe (FF)
28th	1997	Michael Ahern (FF)	David Stanton (FG)	Paul Bradford (FG)	Ned O'Keeffe (FF)
29th	2002	Michael Ahern (FF)	David Stanton (FG)	Joe Sherlock (Lab)	Ned O'Keeffe (FF)
30th	2007	Michael Ahern (FF)	David Stanton (FG)	Seán Sherlock (Lab)	Ned O'Keeffe (FF)
31st	2011	Sandra McLellan (SF)	David Stanton (FG)	Seán Sherlock (Lab)	Tom Barry (FG)
32nd	2016	Pat Buckley (SF)	David Stanton (FG)	Seán Sherlock (Lab)	Kevin O'Keeffe (FF)
33rd	2020	Pat Buckley (SF)	David Stanton (FG)	Seán Sherlock (Lab)	James O'Connor (FF)
34th	2024	Pat Buckley (SF)	Noel McCarthy (FG)	Liam Quaide (SD)	James O'Connor (FF)
