= Michael Davern =

Irish politician (1900–1973)

Teachta Dála
- In office February 1948 – April 1965
- Constituency: Tipperary South

Personal details
- Born: 23 July 1900 Cashel, County Tipperary, Ireland
- Died: 25 July 1973 (aged 73) County Tipperary, Ireland
- Party: Fianna Fáil
- Children: Don, Noel

Military service
- Branch/service: Irish Volunteers; Irish Republican Army
- Rank: Staff captain
- Battles/wars: Irish War of Independence

Michael J. Davern (23 July 1900 – 25 July 1973) was an Irish Fianna Fáil politician who served as Teachta Dála (TD) for the Tipperary South constituency from 1948 to 1965.

He was born 23 July 1900 in Ballymore, Cashel, County Tipperary, son of Owen Davern, a shopkeeper, who was a member for many years of South Tipperary County Council, and Johanna Davern (née Ryan). After attending national school locally, Michael Davern joined the Irish Volunteers at the age of 17 along with his brother Patrick. He was arrested for possession of gelignite and was imprisoned in Cork Prison and Mountjoy Prison, Dublin, where he went on a 21 day hunger strike. He served in the Irish War of Independence with the 3rd Tipperary brigade of the IRA, attaining the rank of Staff captain. He suffered wounds during an engagement with Black and Tans at Ballagh, County Tipperary. Despite anti-Treaty sympathies, he took no active part in the Irish Civil War.

He was elected to Dáil Éireann at the 1948 general election, and was re-elected at the 1951, 1954, 1957 and 1961 general elections.

Davern did not contest the 1965 general election and was succeeded by his son Don Davern. After Don's death in 1968, another son Noel Davern was elected for Tipperary South at the 1969 general election.

For many years he operated a family-owned licensed business, Davern's Bar, on Main Street, Cashel. He died 25 July 1973 in Cashel, and was buried with military honours in St Cormac's cemetery.

== See also ==
- Families in the Oireachtas

Dáil	Election	Deputy (Party)	Deputy (Party)	Deputy (Party)	Deputy (Party)
13th	1948	Michael Davern (FF)	Richard Mulcahy (FG)	Dan Breen (FF)	John Timoney (CnaP)
14th	1951	Michael Davern (FF)	Richard Mulcahy (FG)	Dan Breen (FF)	Patrick Crowe (FG)
15th	1954	Michael Davern (FF)	Richard Mulcahy (FG)	Dan Breen (FF)	Patrick Crowe (FG)
16th	1957	Michael Davern (FF)	Richard Mulcahy (FG)	Dan Breen (FF)	Frank Loughman (FF)
17th	1961	Michael Davern (FF)	Patrick Hogan (FG)	Dan Breen (FF)	Seán Treacy (Note: Treacy served as Ceann Comhairle in the 20th Dáil from 1973 to 1977, and was returned automatically at the 1977 election. He lost the Labour party whip in February 1985.) (Lab)
18th	1965	Don Davern (FF)	Patrick Hogan (FG)	Jackie Fahey (FF)	Seán Treacy (Lab)
19th	1969	Noel Davern (FF)	Patrick Hogan (FG)	Jackie Fahey (FF)	Seán Treacy (Lab)
20th	1973	Noel Davern (FF)	Brendan Griffin (FG)	Jackie Fahey (FF)	Seán Treacy (Lab)
21st	1977	Noel Davern (FF)	Brendan Griffin (FG)	3 seats 1977–1981	Seán Treacy (Lab)
22nd	1981	Carrie Acheson (FF)	Brendan Griffin (FG)	Seán McCarthy (FF)	Seán Treacy (Lab)
23rd	1982 (Feb)	Seán Byrne (FF)	Brendan Griffin (FG)	Seán McCarthy (FF)	Seán Treacy (Lab)
24th	1982 (Nov)	Seán Byrne (FF)	Brendan Griffin (FG)	Seán McCarthy (FF)	Seán Treacy (Lab)
25th	1987	Noel Davern (FF)	Brendan Griffin (FG)	Seán McCarthy (FF)	Seán Treacy (Note: Treacy served as Ceann Comhairle in the 25th, 26th and 27th Dáil from 1987 to 1997, and was returned automatically at the 1989 and 1992 elections.) (Ind.)
26th	1989	Noel Davern (FF)	Theresa Ahearn (FG)	Michael Ferris (Lab)	Seán Treacy (Ind.)
27th	1992	Noel Davern (FF)	Theresa Ahearn (FG)	Michael Ferris (Lab)	Seán Treacy (Ind.)
28th	1997	Noel Davern (FF)	Theresa Ahearn (FG)	Michael Ferris (Lab)	3 seats from 1997
28th	2000 by-election	Noel Davern (FF)	Theresa Ahearn (FG)	Séamus Healy (Ind.)	3 seats from 1997
28th	2001 by-election	Noel Davern (FF)	Tom Hayes (FG)	Séamus Healy (Ind.)	3 seats from 1997
29th	2002	Noel Davern (FF)	Tom Hayes (FG)	Séamus Healy (Ind.)	3 seats from 1997
30th	2007	Mattie McGrath (FF)	Tom Hayes (FG)	Martin Mansergh (FF)	3 seats from 1997
31st	2011	Mattie McGrath (Ind.)	Tom Hayes (FG)	Séamus Healy (WUA)	3 seats from 1997
32nd	2016	Constituency abolished. See Tipperary			

Dáil	Election	Deputy (Party)	Deputy (Party)	Deputy (Party)
34th	2024	Mattie McGrath (Ind.)	Michael Murphy (FG)	Séamus Healy (Ind.)
