= Rory O'Hanlon =

Irish politician (1934–2026)

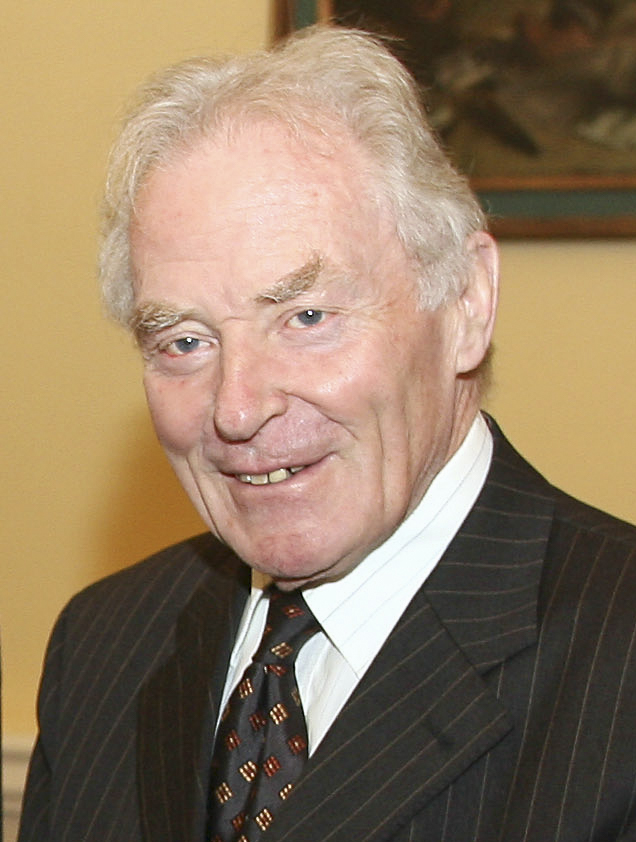
- O'Hanlon in 2006

Ceann Comhairle of Dáil Éireann
- In office 6 June 2002 – 14 June 2007
- Deputy: Séamus Pattison
- Preceded by: Séamus Pattison
- Succeeded by: John O'Donoghue

Leas-Cheann Comhairle of Dáil Éireann
- In office 9 July 1997 – 6 June 2002
- Ceann Comhairle: Séamus Pattison
- Preceded by: Joe Jacob
- Succeeded by: Séamus Pattison

Minister for the Environment
- In office 14 November 1991 – 14 February 1992
- Taoiseach: Charles Haughey
- Preceded by: John Wilson
- Succeeded by: Michael Smith

Minister for Health
- In office 10 March 1987 – 14 November 1991
- Taoiseach: Charles Haughey
- Preceded by: John Boland
- Succeeded by: Mary O'Rourke

Minister of State
- Oct.–Dec. 1982: Social Welfare

Teachta Dála
- In office June 1977 – February 2011
- Constituency: Cavan–Monaghan

Personal details
- Born: 7 February 1934 Dublin, Ireland
- Died: 31 March 2026 (aged 92)
- Party: Fianna Fáil
- Spouse: Teresa Ward (m. 1960)
- Children: 6, including Ardal
- Education: University College Dublin

Rory O'Hanlon (7 February 1934 – 31 March 2026) was an Irish Fianna Fáil politician who served as Ceann Comhairle of Dáil Éireann from 2002 to 2007, Leas-Cheann Comhairle of Dáil Éireann from 1997 to 2002, Minister for the Environment from 1991 to 1992, Minister for Health from 1987 to 1991, and Minister of State for Social Welfare Claims in 1982. He served as a TD for Cavan–Monaghan from 1977 to 2011.

== Early life ==
Born in Dublin on 7 February 1934, O'Hanlon was brought up in a family that had a strong association with the republican tradition. His father, Michael ('Mick') O'Hanlon, who studied medicine at University College, Dublin (UCD), after boarding at Blackrock College, was from Mullaghbawn in South Armagh and was a member of the Fourth Northern Division of the Irish Republican Army (IRA) during the War of Independence; Mick took the Republican side (Anti-Treaty) during the Irish Civil War. As is made clear during a personal interview with Tim Pat Coogan for his biography of Michael Collins, O'Hanlon confirmed his father's military service on Bloody Sunday in Dublin in November 1920, where Mick O'Hanlon assisted members of Michael Collins's 'Squad' in the killing of known British agents in the Cairo Gang, who were placing a stranglehold on Collins's Intelligence war at the time. His father was a close friend of Frank Aiken and was imprisoned in the Old Gaol in Dundalk from where members of the Fourth Northern Division escaped during the famous Hole-In-The-Wall breakout.

O'Hanlon was educated at Mullaghbawn Primary School in the south of County Armagh, before later attending St. Mary's College, Dundalk, and Blackrock College, a private school in Dublin. He subsequently studied medicine, like his father, at UCD, and qualified as a doctor. In 1965, he was appointed to Carrickmacross in the south of County Monaghan as the local general practitioner (GP) and was the medical representative on the North Eastern Health Board from its inception in 1970 until 1987.

== Political career ==
=== Beginnings ===
O'Hanlon entered his first electoral contest when he was the Fianna Fáil candidate in the 1973 Monaghan by-election caused by the election of Erskine Childers to the Presidency. He was unsuccessful on this occasion but was elected at the 1977 general election in Cavan–Monaghan. O'Hanlon was one of a handful of new Fianna Fáil deputies who were elected in that landslide victory for the party and, as a new TD, he remained on the backbenches. Two years later he became a member of Monaghan County Council, serving on that authority until 1987.

In 1979, Jack Lynch suddenly resigned as Taoiseach and leader of Fianna Fáil. The subsequent leadership election resulted in a straight contest between Charles Haughey and George Colley. The latter had the backing of the majority of the existing cabinet, however, a backbench revolt saw Haughey become Taoiseach. O'Hanlon had supported Colley and was thus overlooked for appointment to the new ministerial and junior ministerial positions. Despite this, he did become a member of the powerful Public Accounts Committee in the Oireachtas.

When Fianna Fáil returned to power after a short-lived Fine Gael-Labour Party government in 1982, O'Hanlon was once again overlooked for ministerial promotion. An extensive cabinet reshuffle towards the end of the year saw O'Hanlon become Minister of State for Social Welfare Payments. His tenure was short-lived as the government fell a few weeks later and Fianna Fáil were out of power.

=== Government minister ===
In early 1983, Charles Haughey announced a new front bench and O'Hanlon was promoted to the position of spokesperson on Health and Social Welfare.

Following the 1987 general election, Fianna Fáil were back in power, albeit with a minority government, and O'Hanlon became Minister for Health. Immediately after taking office, he was confronted with several controversial issues, including the resolution of a radiographers' dispute and the formation of an HIV/AIDS awareness campaign. While Fianna Fáil campaigned on a platform of not introducing any public spending cuts, the party committed a complete u-turn once in government. The savage cuts about healthcare earned O'Hanlon the nickname "Dr. Death". Despite earning this reputation, O'Hanlon also introduced a law to curb smoking in public places.

O'Hanlon's handling of the Department of Health meant that he was one of the names tipped for promotion as a result of Ray MacSharry's departure as Minister for Finance. In the end, he was retained as Minister for Health and was disappointed not to be given a new portfolio following the 1989 general election.

In 1991, O'Hanlon became Minister for the Environment. This was following Albert Reynolds's failed leadership challenge against Charles Haughey. He succeeded Pádraig Flynn who had been part of the challenge to Haughey.

When Reynolds succeeded as Taoiseach in 1992, O'Hanlon was one of several high-profile members of the cabinet who lost their ministerial positions.

=== Post-cabinet career ===
In 1995, O'Hanlon became chair of the Fianna Fáil parliamentary party before being elected Leas-Cheann Comhairle (deputy chair) of Dáil Éireann in 1997. Following the 2002 general election, O'Hanlon became Ceann Comhairle of Dáil Éireann. In this position, he was required to remain neutral and, as such, he was no longer classed as a representative of any political party. He was an active chair of the Dáil; however, on occasion, he was criticised, most notably by Labour's Pat Rabbitte, for allegedly stifling debate and being overly protective of the government. Following the 2007 general election, he was succeeded as Ceann Comhairle by John O'Donoghue. He was the vice-chair of the Joint Oireachtas Committee on Foreign Affairs.

He retired from politics at the 2011 general election.

== Personal life and death ==
He was the father of actor and comedian Ardal O'Hanlon. Paddy O'Hanlon, a founder member of the SDLP, was Rory's first cousin.

O'Hanlon died on 31 March 2026, aged 92.

Political offices
Preceded by Denis Gallagher	Minister of State at the Department of Social Welfare; Oct.–Dec. 1982	Succeeded by Fergus O'Brien
Preceded by John Boland	Minister for Health; 1987–1991	Succeeded by Mary O'Rourke
Preceded by John Wilson (acting)	Minister for the Environment; 1991–1992	Succeeded by Michael Smith
Preceded by Joe Jacob	Leas-Cheann Comhairle of Dáil Éireann; 1997–2002	Succeeded by Séamus Pattison
Preceded by Séamus Pattison	Ceann Comhairle of Dáil Éireann; 2002–2007	Succeeded by John O'Donoghue
Party political offices
Preceded by Joe Jacob	Chair of the Fianna Fáil parliamentary party 1995–2002	Succeeded by Séamus Kirk

Dáil	Election	Deputy (Party)	Deputy (Party)	Deputy (Party)	Deputy (Party)	Deputy (Party)
21st	1977	Jimmy Leonard (FF)	John Wilson (FF)	Thomas J. Fitzpatrick (FG)	Rory O'Hanlon (FF)	John Conlan (FG)
22nd	1981	Kieran Doherty (AHB)	John Wilson (FF)	Thomas J. Fitzpatrick (FG)	Rory O'Hanlon (FF)	John Conlan (FG)
23rd	1982 (Feb)	Jimmy Leonard (FF)	John Wilson (FF)	Thomas J. Fitzpatrick (FG)	Rory O'Hanlon (FF)	John Conlan (FG)
24th	1982 (Nov)	Jimmy Leonard (FF)	John Wilson (FF)	Thomas J. Fitzpatrick (FG)	Rory O'Hanlon (FF)	John Conlan (FG)
25th	1987	Jimmy Leonard (FF)	John Wilson (FF)	Thomas J. Fitzpatrick (FG)	Rory O'Hanlon (FF)	Andrew Boylan (FG)
26th	1989	Jimmy Leonard (FF)	John Wilson (FF)	Bill Cotter (FG)	Rory O'Hanlon (FF)	Andrew Boylan (FG)
27th	1992	Jimmy Leonard (FF)	Brendan Smith (FF)	Seymour Crawford (FG)	Rory O'Hanlon (FF)	Andrew Boylan (FG)
28th	1997	Caoimhghín Ó Caoláin (SF)	Brendan Smith (FF)	Seymour Crawford (FG)	Rory O'Hanlon (FF)	Andrew Boylan (FG)
29th	2002	Caoimhghín Ó Caoláin (SF)	Brendan Smith (FF)	Seymour Crawford (FG)	Rory O'Hanlon (FF)	Paudge Connolly (Ind.)
30th	2007	Caoimhghín Ó Caoláin (SF)	Brendan Smith (FF)	Seymour Crawford (FG)	Rory O'Hanlon (FF)	Margaret Conlon (FF)
31st	2011	Caoimhghín Ó Caoláin (SF)	Brendan Smith (FF)	Heather Humphreys (FG)	Joe O'Reilly (FG)	Seán Conlan (FG)
32nd	2016	Caoimhghín Ó Caoláin (SF)	Brendan Smith (FF)	Heather Humphreys (FG)	Niamh Smyth (FF)	4 seats 2016–2020
33rd	2020	Matt Carthy (SF)	Brendan Smith (FF)	Heather Humphreys (FG)	Niamh Smyth (FF)	Pauline Tully (SF)
34th	2024	Matt Carthy (SF)	Brendan Smith (FF)	David Maxwell (FG)	Niamh Smyth (FF)	Cathy Bennett (SF)
