= Séamus Pattison =

Irish politician (1936–2018)

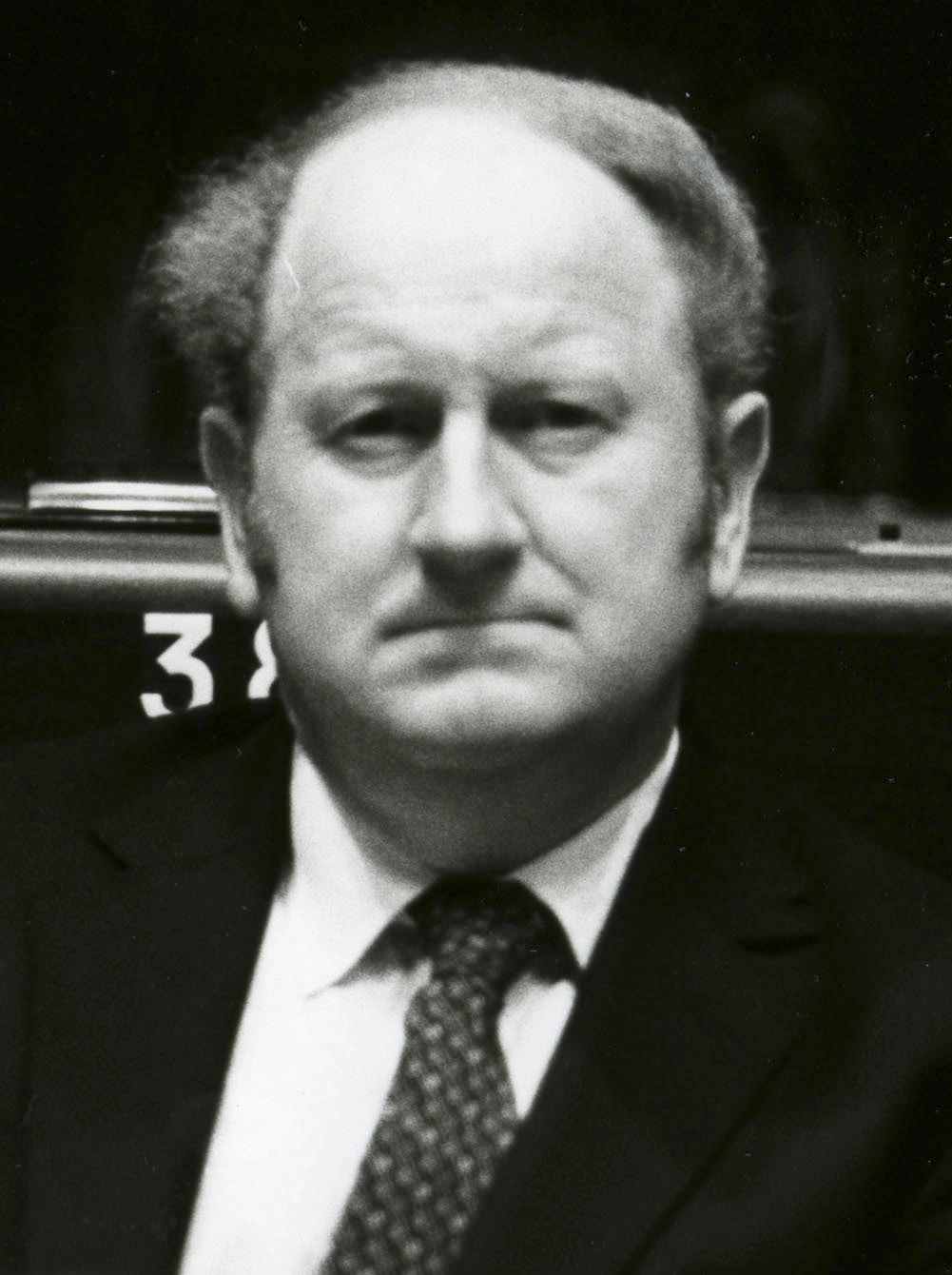
- Pattison in 1982

Leas-Cheann Comhairle of Dáil Éireann
- In office 18 June 2002 – 14 June 2007
- Ceann Comhairle: Rory O'Hanlon
- Preceded by: Rory O'Hanlon
- Succeeded by: Brendan Howlin

Ceann Comhairle of Dáil Éireann
- In office 26 June 1997 – 6 June 2002
- Deputy: Rory O'Hanlon
- Preceded by: Seán Treacy
- Succeeded by: Rory O'Hanlon

Minister of State
- 1983–1987: Social Welfare

Teachta Dála
- In office October 1961 – June 2007
- Constituency: Carlow–Kilkenny

Member of the European Parliament
- In office 1 July 1981 – 17 December 1983
- Constituency: Leinster

Personal details
- Born: 19 April 1936 Kilkenny, Ireland
- Died: 4 February 2018 (aged 81) Kilkenny, Ireland
- Party: Labour Party
- Parent: James Pattison (father)
- Education: University College Cork

Séamus Pattison (19 April 1936 – 4 February 2018) was an Irish Labour Party politician who served as Leas-Cheann Comhairle of Dáil Éireann from 2002 to 2007, Ceann Comhairle of Dáil Éireann from 1997 to 2002, Minister of State for Social Welfare from 1983 to 1987 and Father of the Dáil from 1995 to 2007. He served as a Teachta Dála (TD) for the Carlow–Kilkenny constituency from 1961 to 2007. He was a Member of the European Parliament (MEP) for the Leinster constituency from 1981 to 1983.

== Early life and education ==
Séamus Pattison was born in Kilkenny in 1936. His father was Labour Party TD James Pattison, who represented Carlow–Kilkenny from 1933 to 1957. After his education at University College Cork, Pattison became a full-time trade union official, serving with the Irish Transport and General Workers' Union (ITGWU).

== Career ==
Pattison unsuccessfully contested the Carlow–Kilkenny by-election for Labour in June 1960, but was elected at the 1961 general election to the 17th Dáil, and held the seat at eleven further general elections.

He served as Mayor of Kilkenny on three occasions; 1967, 1976 and 1992. He became an MEP for Leinster in 1981, to replace Liam Kavanagh who became Minister for Labour following the 1981 general election. Pattison resigned as an MEP in 1983, following his appointment as Minister of State at the Department of Social Welfare, in which position he served until Labour left the government in January 1987.

He was unanimously elected Ceann Comhairle of Dáil Éireann on 26 June 1997, serving for the 28th Dáil. When the 29th Dáil assembled after the 2002 general election he was succeeded by Rory O'Hanlon, but was appointed as Leas-Cheann Comhairle (deputy chairperson) for the 29th Dáil.

Pattison was also a member of the Parliamentary Assembly of the Council of Europe.

In September 2005, he announced he would retire at the following general election, and his nephew Eoin Pattison unsuccessfully sought the nomination. Labour county councillor Michael O'Brien was selected in February 2006 to contest the seat, but was unsuccessful in the 2007 general election.

== Later life and death ==
When Pattison retired from politics at the 2007 election he had served in Dáil Éireann for 45 years and 7 months, making him the fifth-longest serving TD ever, and the longest-ever-serving Labour Party TD. He was the longest-serving sitting TD from 1995 to 2007, and had the informal title of Father of the Dáil.

Pattison died from Parkinson's disease at his home in Kilkenny on 4 February 2018, aged 81.

== See also ==
- Families in the Oireachtas

Political offices
Preceded by Seán Treacy	Ceann Comhairle of Dáil Éireann; 1997–2002	Succeeded by Rory O'Hanlon
Preceded by Rory O'Hanlon	Leas-Cheann Comhairle of Dáil Éireann; 2002–2007	Succeeded by Brendan Howlin
Honorary titles
Preceded by Neil Blaney	Father of the Dáil; 1995–2007	Succeeded by Enda Kenny

Dáil	Election	Deputy (Party)	Deputy (Party)	Deputy (Party)	Deputy (Party)	Deputy (Party)
2nd	1921	Edward Aylward (SF)	W. T. Cosgrave (SF)	James Lennon (SF)	Gearóid O'Sullivan (SF)	4 seats 1921–1923
3rd	1922	Patrick Gaffney (Lab)	W. T. Cosgrave (PT-SF)	Denis Gorey (FP)	Gearóid O'Sullivan (PT-SF)	4 seats 1921–1923
4th	1923	Edward Doyle (Lab)	W. T. Cosgrave (CnaG)	Denis Gorey (FP)	Michael Shelly (Rep)	Seán Gibbons (CnaG)
4th	1925 by-election	Edward Doyle (Lab)	W. T. Cosgrave (CnaG)	Denis Gorey (FP)	Michael Shelly (Rep)	Thomas Bolger (CnaG)
5th	1927 (Jun)	Edward Doyle (Lab)	W. T. Cosgrave (CnaG)	Denis Gorey (CnaG)	Thomas Derrig (FF)	Richard Holohan (FP)
6th	1927 (Sep)	Edward Doyle (Lab)	W. T. Cosgrave (CnaG)	Peter de Loughry (CnaG)	Thomas Derrig (FF)	Richard Holohan (FP)
6th	1927 by-election	Edward Doyle (Lab)	Denis Gorey (CnaG)	Peter de Loughry (CnaG)	Thomas Derrig (FF)	Richard Holohan (FP)
7th	1932	Francis Humphreys (FF)	Denis Gorey (CnaG)	Desmond FitzGerald (CnaG)	Thomas Derrig (FF)	Seán Gibbons (FF)
8th	1933	James Pattison (Lab)	Richard Holohan (NCP)	Desmond FitzGerald (CnaG)	Thomas Derrig (FF)	Seán Gibbons (FF)
9th	1937	Constituency abolished. See Kilkenny and Carlow–Kildare				

Dáil	Election	Deputy (Party)	Deputy (Party)	Deputy (Party)	Deputy (Party)	Deputy (Party)
13th	1948	James Pattison (NLP)	Thomas Walsh (FF)	Thomas Derrig (FF)	Joseph Hughes (FG)	Patrick Crotty (FG)
14th	1951	Francis Humphreys (FF)	Thomas Walsh (FF)	Thomas Derrig (FF)	Joseph Hughes (FG)	Patrick Crotty (FG)
15th	1954	James Pattison (Lab)	Thomas Walsh (FF)	Thomas Derrig (FF)	Joseph Hughes (FG)	Patrick Crotty (FG)
15th	1956 by-election	James Pattison (Lab)	Martin Medlar (FF)	Thomas Derrig (FF)	Joseph Hughes (FG)	Patrick Crotty (FG)
16th	1957	Francis Humphreys (FF)	Martin Medlar (FF)	Jim Gibbons (FF)	Joseph Hughes (FG)	Patrick Crotty (FG)
16th	1960 by-election	Patrick Teehan (FF)	Martin Medlar (FF)	Jim Gibbons (FF)	Joseph Hughes (FG)	Patrick Crotty (FG)
17th	1961	Séamus Pattison (Lab)	Martin Medlar (FF)	Jim Gibbons (FF)	Desmond Governey (FG)	Patrick Crotty (FG)
18th	1965	Séamus Pattison (Lab)	Tom Nolan (FF)	Jim Gibbons (FF)	Desmond Governey (FG)	Patrick Crotty (FG)
19th	1969	Séamus Pattison (Lab)	Tom Nolan (FF)	Jim Gibbons (FF)	Desmond Governey (FG)	Kieran Crotty (FG)
20th	1973	Séamus Pattison (Lab)	Tom Nolan (FF)	Jim Gibbons (FF)	Desmond Governey (FG)	Kieran Crotty (FG)
21st	1977	Séamus Pattison (Lab)	Tom Nolan (FF)	Jim Gibbons (FF)	Liam Aylward (FF)	Kieran Crotty (FG)
22nd	1981	Séamus Pattison (Lab)	Tom Nolan (FF)	Desmond Governey (FG)	Liam Aylward (FF)	Kieran Crotty (FG)
23rd	1982 (Feb)	Séamus Pattison (Lab)	Jim Gibbons (FF)	Desmond Governey (FG)	Liam Aylward (FF)	Kieran Crotty (FG)
24th	1982 (Nov)	Séamus Pattison (Lab)	M. J. Nolan (FF)	Dick Dowling (FG)	Liam Aylward (FF)	Kieran Crotty (FG)
25th	1987	Séamus Pattison (Lab)	M. J. Nolan (FF)	Martin Gibbons (PDs)	Liam Aylward (FF)	Kieran Crotty (FG)
26th	1989	Séamus Pattison (Lab)	M. J. Nolan (FF)	Phil Hogan (FG)	Liam Aylward (FF)	John Browne (FG)
27th	1992	Séamus Pattison (Lab)	M. J. Nolan (FF)	Phil Hogan (FG)	Liam Aylward (FF)	John Browne (FG)
28th	1997	Séamus Pattison (Lab)	John McGuinness (FF)	Phil Hogan (FG)	Liam Aylward (FF)	John Browne (FG)
29th	2002	Séamus Pattison (Lab)	John McGuinness (FF)	Phil Hogan (FG)	Liam Aylward (FF)	M. J. Nolan (FF)
30th	2007	Mary White (GP)	John McGuinness (FF)	Phil Hogan (FG)	Bobby Aylward (FF)	M. J. Nolan (FF)
31st	2011	Ann Phelan (Lab)	John McGuinness (FF)	Phil Hogan (FG)	John Paul Phelan (FG)	Pat Deering (FG)
31st	2015 by-election	Ann Phelan (Lab)	John McGuinness (FF)	Bobby Aylward (FF)	John Paul Phelan (FG)	Pat Deering (FG)
32nd	2016	Kathleen Funchion (SF)	John McGuinness (FF)	Bobby Aylward (FF)	John Paul Phelan (FG)	Pat Deering (FG)
33rd	2020	Kathleen Funchion (SF)	John McGuinness (FF)	Jennifer Murnane O'Connor (FF)	John Paul Phelan (FG)	Malcolm Noonan (GP)
34th	2024	Natasha Newsome Drennan (SF)	John McGuinness (FF)	Jennifer Murnane O'Connor (FF)	Catherine Callaghan (FG)	Peter "Chap" Cleere (FF)
