= List of members of the Oireachtas imprisoned during the Irish revolutionary period =

This is a list of members of the Oireachtas (National Parliament of Ireland) who served a prison sentence or were interned during the Irish revolutionary period (1916–23) in any jurisdiction before, during or after their time as a Teachta Dála (TD) or Senator.

Many were imprisoned as a result of their actions against the British Government in the lead-up to the formation of the Irish Free State in 1922. The list is ordered by first term of imprisonment.

Name	Party	Term of office		Prison time	Prison(s)	Reason	Notes
Liam Mellows	Anti-Treaty Sinn Féin	1918	1922	–1916	Reading	Arrested under the Defence of the Realm Act 1914	
Liam Mellows	Anti-Treaty Sinn Féin	1918	1922	1917–1918	The Tombs	Attempting to aid the German side in World War I	
Liam Mellows	Anti-Treaty Sinn Féin	1918	1922	Jun–Dec 1922	Mountjoy	Actions during the Irish Civil War	Executed in December 1922
Gerald Boland	Anti-Treaty Sinn Féin, Fianna Fáil	1923	1969	1916–1917	Frongoch	Interned for participating in 1916 Easter Rising	
Con Collins	Anti-Treaty Sinn Féin	1918	1923	1916–1917	Frongoch	Interned for participating in 1916 Easter Rising	
Michael Collins	Pro-Treaty Sinn Féin	1918	Aug 1922	1916–1917	Frongoch	Interned for participating in 1916 Easter Rising	
Éamon de Valera	Anti-Treaty Sinn Féin, Fianna Fáil	Jul 1917	Jun 1959	1916–1917	Dartmoor, Maidstone, Lewes	Interned for participating in 1916 Easter Rising	Sentenced to death, commuted to life imprisonment because of his U.S. citizenship
Éamon de Valera	Anti-Treaty Sinn Féin, Fianna Fáil	Jul 1917	Jun 1959	May 1918–Feb 1919	Lincoln	Sedition	Escaped in February 1919
Éamon de Valera	Anti-Treaty Sinn Féin, Fianna Fáil	Jul 1917	Jun 1959	1923–1924	Arbour Hill	Actions during the Irish Civil War	
Éamon de Valera	Anti-Treaty Sinn Féin, Fianna Fáil	Jul 1917	Jun 1959	1924	Crumlin Road	Illegally entering Northern Ireland	Held for 1 month in Solitary confinement
Arthur Griffith	Pro-Treaty Sinn Féin	Jun 1918	Aug 1922	1916–1917	Frongoch	Interned for participating in 1916 Easter Rising	
Diarmuid Lynch	Sinn Féin	1918	1921	1916–1917	Pentonville	Interned for participating in 1916 Easter Rising	Sentenced to death, commuted to life imprisonment because of his U.S. citizenship
Pierce McCan	Sinn Féin	1918	Mar 1919	1916–1917	Reading	Interned for participating in 1916 Easter Rising	
Pierce McCan	Sinn Féin	1918	Mar 1919	May 1918–Mar 1919	Gloucester	Suspected involvement in the German Plot	Died in prison from influenza
Patrick O'Keeffe	Pro-Treaty Sinn Féin	1918	1922	ca. 1918		Anti-British activity	Listed on the roll of the First Dáil as "imprisoned abroad".
Bryan Cusack	Anti-Treaty Sinn Féin, Fianna Fáil	1918	1923	ca. 1918			
Seán McGarry	Pro-Treaty Sinn Féin, Cumann na nGaedheal	1921	Oct 1924	1916–1917	Frongoch	Interned for participating in 1916 Easter Rising	
Seán McGarry	Pro-Treaty Sinn Féin, Cumann na nGaedheal	1921	Oct 1924	May 1918–Feb 1919	Lincoln	Conspiring with the German enemy	Escaped in February 1919
Constance Markievicz	Sinn Féin, Fianna Fáil	1918	Jul 1927	1916–1917	Kilmainham	Interned for participating in 1916 Easter Rising	Sentenced to death, commuted to life imprisonment on account of her gender
Constance Markievicz	Sinn Féin, Fianna Fáil	1918	Jul 1927	May 1918–Mar 1919	Holloway	Suspected involvement in the German Plot	
Richard Mulcahy	Pro-Treaty Sinn Féin, Cumann na nGaedheal, Fine Gael	1918	1961	Apr–Dec 1916	Frongoch	Interned for participating in 1916 Easter Rising	
Cathal Ó Murchadha	Sinn Féin	1921	Jun 1927	1916–1917	Frongoch	Interned for participating in 1916 Easter Rising	
Cathal Ó Murchadha	Sinn Féin	1921	Jun 1927	1922–1923	Curragh Camp	Actions during the Irish Civil War	
Alexander McCabe	Sinn Féin	1918	1925	1919		Anti-British activity	Listed on the roll of the First Dáil as "imprisoned abroad"
Art O'Connor	Sinn Féin	1918	1923	1919		Anti-British activity	Listed on the roll of the First Dáil as "imprisoned abroad"
Austin Stack	Sinn Féin	1918	1927	1919		Anti-British activity	Listed on the roll of the First Dáil as "imprisoned abroad"
Brian O'Higgins	Sinn Féin	1918		1919		Anti-British activity	Listed on the roll of the First Dáil as "imprisoned abroad"
Desmond FitzGerald	Sinn Féin	1918		1919		Anti-British activity	Listed on the roll of the First Dáil as "imprisoned abroad"
Ernest Blythe	Sinn Féin	1918		1919		Anti-British activity	Listed on the roll of the First Dáil as "imprisoned abroad"
Fionán Lynch	Sinn Féin	1918		1919		Anti-British activity	Listed on the roll of the First Dáil as "imprisoned abroad"
Frank Fahy	Sinn Féin	1918		1919		Anti-British activity	Listed on the roll of the First Dáil as "imprisoned abroad"
Frank Lawless	Sinn Féin	1918		1919		Anti-British activity	Listed on the roll of the First Dáil as "imprisoned abroad"
J. J. Clancy	Sinn Féin	1918		1919		Anti-British activity	Listed on the roll of the First Dáil as "imprisoned abroad"
James Crowley	Sinn Féin	1918		1919		Anti-British activity	Listed on the roll of the First Dáil as "imprisoned abroad"
James Dolan	Sinn Féin	1918		1919		Anti-British activity	Listed on the roll of the First Dáil as "imprisoned abroad"
James Lennon	Sinn Féin	1918		1919		Anti-British activity	Listed on the roll of the First Dáil as "imprisoned abroad"
Joseph MacBride	Sinn Féin	1918		1919		Anti-British activity	Listed on the roll of the First Dáil as "imprisoned abroad"
Joseph MacDonagh	Sinn Féin	1918		1919		Anti-British activity	Listed on the roll of the First Dáil as "imprisoned abroad"
Joseph McGrath	Sinn Féin	1918		1919		Anti-British activity	Listed on the roll of the First Dáil as "imprisoned abroad"
Joseph McGuinness	Sinn Féin	1918		1919		Anti-British activity	Listed on the roll of the First Dáil as "imprisoned abroad"
Laurence Ginnell	Sinn Féin	1918		1919		Anti-British activity	Listed on the roll of the First Dáil as "imprisoned abroad"
Michael Colivet	Sinn Féin	1918		1919		Anti-British activity	Listed on the roll of the First Dáil as "imprisoned abroad"
Peter Paul Galligan	Sinn Féin	1918		1919		Anti-British activity	Listed on the roll of the First Dáil as "imprisoned abroad"
Richard Hayes	Sinn Féin	1918		1919		Anti-British activity	Listed on the roll of the First Dáil as "imprisoned abroad"
Seán Etchingham	Sinn Féin	1918		1919		Anti-British activity	Listed on the roll of the First Dáil as "imprisoned abroad"
Seán MacEntee	Sinn Féin	1918		1919		Anti-British activity	Listed on the roll of the First Dáil as "imprisoned abroad"
Seán O'Mahony	Sinn Féin	1918		1919		Anti-British activity	Listed on the roll of the First Dáil as "imprisoned abroad"
Thomas Hunter	Sinn Féin	1918		1919		Anti-British activity	Listed on the roll of the First Dáil as "imprisoned abroad"
William Sears	Sinn Féin	1918		1919		Anti-British activity	Listed on the roll of the First Dáil as "imprisoned abroad"
Robert Barton	Sinn Féin	1918	1923	Feb–Mar 1919, Jan 1920–Jul 1921	Mountjoy	Sedition	Escaped in March 1919
Ada English	Sinn Féin	1921	1922	1920	Galway Gaol	Actions during the Irish War of Independence	Six months, released early
Frank Carty	Sinn Féin; Fianna Fáil	1921	1942	1920, 1921	Sligo Gaol, Derry Gaol	Actions during the Irish War of Independence	Escaped from both prisons
Terence MacSwiney	Sinn Féin	1918	Oct 1920	1919; Aug–Oct 1920	Brixton	Possession of seditious articles and documents	Died on hunger strike in October 1920
Linda Kearns MacWhinney	Fianna Fáil	Apr 1938	Jul 1938	Nov 1920–Apr 1921	Walton, Mountjoy	Possession of guns	Escaped in April 1921
Seán Mac Eoin	Pro-Treaty Sinn Féin, Cumann na nGaedheal, Fine Gael	1921	1965	Mar–Aug 1921	Mountjoy	Actions during the Irish War of Independence	Sentenced to death but later commuted
Seán MacBride	Clann na Poblachta	Oct 1947	1957	1922–1923	?	Actions during the Irish Civil War	
Peadar O'Donnell	Sinn Féin	1923	Jun 1927	1922–1924	Mountjoy	Actions during the Irish Civil War	

== See also ==
- List of members of the Oireachtas imprisoned since 1923
- Records of members of the Oireachtas
