= Don Davern =

Irish politician (1935–1968)

Parliamentary Secretary
- 1966–1968: Agriculture and Fisheries

Teachta Dála
- In office April 1965 – 2 November 1968
- Constituency: Tipperary South

Personal details
- Born: Owen Don Bosco Davern; 4 March 1935 Cashel, County Tipperary, Ireland
- Died: 2 November 1968 (aged 33) County Tipperary, Ireland
- Party: Fianna Fáil
- Spouse: Joan Hannigan
- Parent: Michael Davern (father)
- Relatives: Noel Davern (brother)

Donal Davern (4 March 1935 – 2 November 1968) was an Irish Fianna Fáil politician.

He was elected to Dáil Éireann as a Fianna Fáil Teachta Dála (TD) for the Tipperary South constituency at the 1965 general election succeeding his father, Michael Davern. In November 1966, he was appointed Parliamentary Secretary to the Minister for Agriculture and Fisheries.

He died suddenly before completing his first term in Dáil Éireann. His brother Noel Davern was elected at the subsequent general election.

== See also ==
- Families in the Oireachtas

Political offices
Preceded by Patrick Lalor	Parliamentary Secretary to the Minister for Agriculture and Fisheries; 1966–1968	Office abolished

Dáil	Election	Deputy (Party)	Deputy (Party)	Deputy (Party)	Deputy (Party)
13th	1948	Michael Davern (FF)	Richard Mulcahy (FG)	Dan Breen (FF)	John Timoney (CnaP)
14th	1951	Michael Davern (FF)	Richard Mulcahy (FG)	Dan Breen (FF)	Patrick Crowe (FG)
15th	1954	Michael Davern (FF)	Richard Mulcahy (FG)	Dan Breen (FF)	Patrick Crowe (FG)
16th	1957	Michael Davern (FF)	Richard Mulcahy (FG)	Dan Breen (FF)	Frank Loughman (FF)
17th	1961	Michael Davern (FF)	Patrick Hogan (FG)	Dan Breen (FF)	Seán Treacy (Note: Treacy served as Ceann Comhairle in the 20th Dáil from 1973 to 1977, and was returned automatically at the 1977 election. He lost the Labour party whip in February 1985.) (Lab)
18th	1965	Don Davern (FF)	Patrick Hogan (FG)	Jackie Fahey (FF)	Seán Treacy (Lab)
19th	1969	Noel Davern (FF)	Patrick Hogan (FG)	Jackie Fahey (FF)	Seán Treacy (Lab)
20th	1973	Noel Davern (FF)	Brendan Griffin (FG)	Jackie Fahey (FF)	Seán Treacy (Lab)
21st	1977	Noel Davern (FF)	Brendan Griffin (FG)	3 seats 1977–1981	Seán Treacy (Lab)
22nd	1981	Carrie Acheson (FF)	Brendan Griffin (FG)	Seán McCarthy (FF)	Seán Treacy (Lab)
23rd	1982 (Feb)	Seán Byrne (FF)	Brendan Griffin (FG)	Seán McCarthy (FF)	Seán Treacy (Lab)
24th	1982 (Nov)	Seán Byrne (FF)	Brendan Griffin (FG)	Seán McCarthy (FF)	Seán Treacy (Lab)
25th	1987	Noel Davern (FF)	Brendan Griffin (FG)	Seán McCarthy (FF)	Seán Treacy (Note: Treacy served as Ceann Comhairle in the 25th, 26th and 27th Dáil from 1987 to 1997, and was returned automatically at the 1989 and 1992 elections.) (Ind.)
26th	1989	Noel Davern (FF)	Theresa Ahearn (FG)	Michael Ferris (Lab)	Seán Treacy (Ind.)
27th	1992	Noel Davern (FF)	Theresa Ahearn (FG)	Michael Ferris (Lab)	Seán Treacy (Ind.)
28th	1997	Noel Davern (FF)	Theresa Ahearn (FG)	Michael Ferris (Lab)	3 seats from 1997
28th	2000 by-election	Noel Davern (FF)	Theresa Ahearn (FG)	Séamus Healy (Ind.)	3 seats from 1997
28th	2001 by-election	Noel Davern (FF)	Tom Hayes (FG)	Séamus Healy (Ind.)	3 seats from 1997
29th	2002	Noel Davern (FF)	Tom Hayes (FG)	Séamus Healy (Ind.)	3 seats from 1997
30th	2007	Mattie McGrath (FF)	Tom Hayes (FG)	Martin Mansergh (FF)	3 seats from 1997
31st	2011	Mattie McGrath (Ind.)	Tom Hayes (FG)	Séamus Healy (WUA)	3 seats from 1997
32nd	2016	Constituency abolished. See Tipperary			

Dáil	Election	Deputy (Party)	Deputy (Party)	Deputy (Party)
34th	2024	Mattie McGrath (Ind.)	Michael Murphy (FG)	Séamus Healy (Ind.)
