= Noel Davern =

Irish politician (1945–2013)

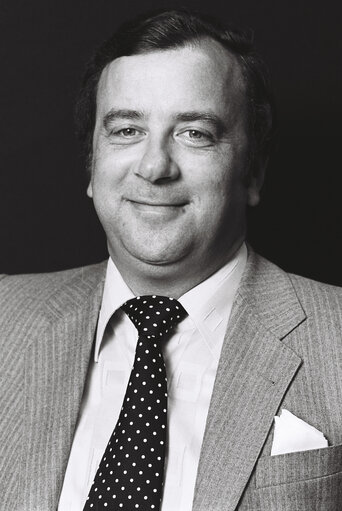
- Davern, c. 1979

Minister of State
- 1997–2002: Agriculture and Food

Minister for Education
- In office 14 November 1991 – 11 February 1992
- Taoiseach: Charles Haughey
- Preceded by: Mary O'Rourke
- Succeeded by: Séamus Brennan

Teachta Dála
- In office February 1987 – May 2007
- In office June 1969 – May 1981
- Constituency: Tipperary South

Member of the European Parliament
- In office 24 June 1979 – 25 June 1984
- Constituency: Munster

Personal details
- Born: Michael Christopher Noel Davern; 24 December 1945 Cashel, County Tipperary, Ireland
- Died: 27 October 2013 (aged 67) Waterford, Ireland
- Party: Fianna Fáil
- Spouse: Anne-Marie Davern (m. 1975)
- Children: 3
- Relatives: Michael Davern (father); Don Davern (brother)

Noel Davern (24 December 1945 – 27 October 2013) was an Irish Fianna Fáil politician who served as Minister of State from 1997 to 2002 and Minister for Education from 1991 to 1992. He served as a Teachta Dála (TD) for the Tipperary South constituency from 1969 to 1981 and 1987 to 2007. He served as a Member of the European Parliament (MEP) for the Munster constituency from 1979 to 1984.

== Career ==
Davern was born in Cashel, County Tipperary, in 1945. He was educated at CBS Cashel and at Franciscan College in County Meath. His family had a long political tradition. His father Michael Davern was a Fianna Fáil TD from 1948 to 1965, when he was succeeded in Dáil Éireann by Noel's brother Don Davern. After Don's sudden death in 1968, the seat remained vacant until Noel was elected to Dáil Éireann at the 1969 general election.

At the 1979 European Parliament election he was elected as an MEP for the Munster constituency. He did not contest the 1981 general election so as to concentrate his time as an MEP. However, he lost his seat at the European Parliament at the 1984 European Parliament election.

Davern was again elected to the Dáil at the 1987 general election. In 1991, he was appointed to cabinet as Minister for Education in a reshuffle that followed a failed attempt of Albert Reynolds and Pádraig Flynn to oust Charles Haughey as taoiseach. Davern's term in office was short-lived; when Reynolds succeeded as taoiseach in early 1992, Davern returned to the backbenches. In 1995, he became Opposition Spokesman on European Affairs when Bertie Ahern named his new front bench. Fianna Fáil were returned to government and Davern was appointed as Minister of State at the Department of Agriculture and Food. He served in that position until 2002.

Davern was one of only three members of the 29th Dáil who had first been elected in the 1960s, the others being Séamus Pattison, elected at the 1961 general election and Michael Smith, also elected at the 1969 general election.

He died on 27 October 2013.

== See also ==
- Families in the Oireachtas

Political offices
Preceded by Mary O'Rourke	Minister for Education; 1991–1992	Succeeded by Séamus Brennan

Dáil	Election	Deputy (Party)	Deputy (Party)	Deputy (Party)	Deputy (Party)
13th	1948	Michael Davern (FF)	Richard Mulcahy (FG)	Dan Breen (FF)	John Timoney (CnaP)
14th	1951	Michael Davern (FF)	Richard Mulcahy (FG)	Dan Breen (FF)	Patrick Crowe (FG)
15th	1954	Michael Davern (FF)	Richard Mulcahy (FG)	Dan Breen (FF)	Patrick Crowe (FG)
16th	1957	Michael Davern (FF)	Richard Mulcahy (FG)	Dan Breen (FF)	Frank Loughman (FF)
17th	1961	Michael Davern (FF)	Patrick Hogan (FG)	Dan Breen (FF)	Seán Treacy (Note: Treacy served as Ceann Comhairle in the 20th Dáil from 1973 to 1977, and was returned automatically at the 1977 election. He lost the Labour party whip in February 1985.) (Lab)
18th	1965	Don Davern (FF)	Patrick Hogan (FG)	Jackie Fahey (FF)	Seán Treacy (Lab)
19th	1969	Noel Davern (FF)	Patrick Hogan (FG)	Jackie Fahey (FF)	Seán Treacy (Lab)
20th	1973	Noel Davern (FF)	Brendan Griffin (FG)	Jackie Fahey (FF)	Seán Treacy (Lab)
21st	1977	Noel Davern (FF)	Brendan Griffin (FG)	3 seats 1977–1981	Seán Treacy (Lab)
22nd	1981	Carrie Acheson (FF)	Brendan Griffin (FG)	Seán McCarthy (FF)	Seán Treacy (Lab)
23rd	1982 (Feb)	Seán Byrne (FF)	Brendan Griffin (FG)	Seán McCarthy (FF)	Seán Treacy (Lab)
24th	1982 (Nov)	Seán Byrne (FF)	Brendan Griffin (FG)	Seán McCarthy (FF)	Seán Treacy (Lab)
25th	1987	Noel Davern (FF)	Brendan Griffin (FG)	Seán McCarthy (FF)	Seán Treacy (Note: Treacy served as Ceann Comhairle in the 25th, 26th and 27th Dáil from 1987 to 1997, and was returned automatically at the 1989 and 1992 elections.) (Ind.)
26th	1989	Noel Davern (FF)	Theresa Ahearn (FG)	Michael Ferris (Lab)	Seán Treacy (Ind.)
27th	1992	Noel Davern (FF)	Theresa Ahearn (FG)	Michael Ferris (Lab)	Seán Treacy (Ind.)
28th	1997	Noel Davern (FF)	Theresa Ahearn (FG)	Michael Ferris (Lab)	3 seats from 1997
28th	2000 by-election	Noel Davern (FF)	Theresa Ahearn (FG)	Séamus Healy (Ind.)	3 seats from 1997
28th	2001 by-election	Noel Davern (FF)	Tom Hayes (FG)	Séamus Healy (Ind.)	3 seats from 1997
29th	2002	Noel Davern (FF)	Tom Hayes (FG)	Séamus Healy (Ind.)	3 seats from 1997
30th	2007	Mattie McGrath (FF)	Tom Hayes (FG)	Martin Mansergh (FF)	3 seats from 1997
31st	2011	Mattie McGrath (Ind.)	Tom Hayes (FG)	Séamus Healy (WUA)	3 seats from 1997
32nd	2016	Constituency abolished. See Tipperary			

Dáil	Election	Deputy (Party)	Deputy (Party)	Deputy (Party)
34th	2024	Mattie McGrath (Ind.)	Michael Murphy (FG)	Séamus Healy (Ind.)
