= Eoin Ryan Jnr =

Irish former politician (born 1953)

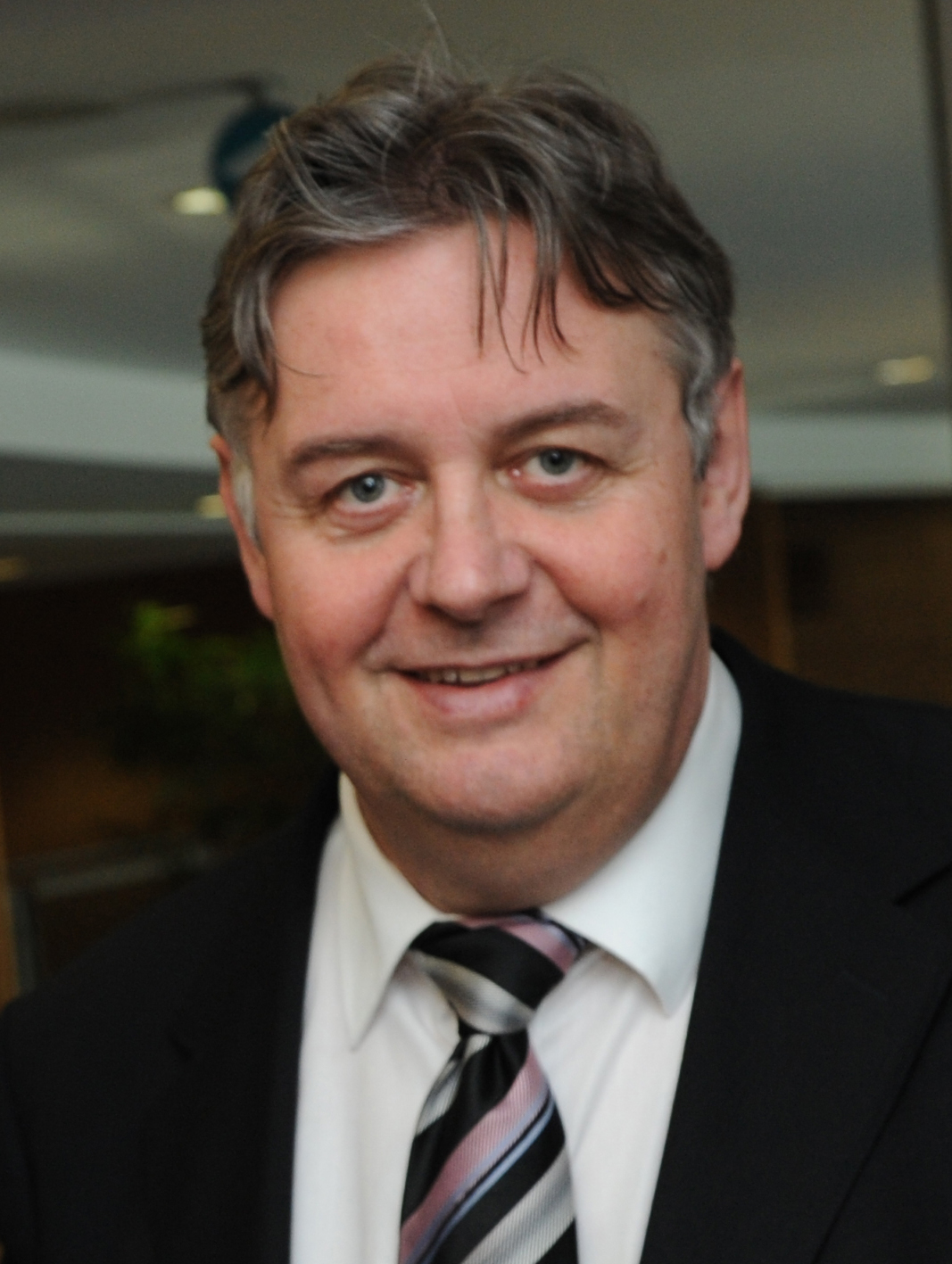
- Ryan in 2009

Member of the European Parliament
- In office June 2004 – June 2009
- Constituency: Dublin

Minister of State
- 2000–2002: Tourism, Sport and Recreation

Teachta Dála
- In office November 1992 – May 2007
- Constituency: Dublin South-East

Senator
- In office 1 November 1989 – 25 November 1992
- Constituency: Nominated by the Taoiseach

Personal details
- Born: 24 February 1953 (age 73) Dublin, Ireland
- Party: Fianna Fáil
- Parent: Eoin Ryan Snr (father)
- Relatives: James Ryan (grandfather)

Eoin Ryan (born 24 February 1953) is an Irish former Fianna Fáil politician. He was a Member of the European Parliament (MEP) for Dublin from 2004 to 2009, and also was a Teachta Dála (TD) for Dublin South-East from 1992 to 2007.

== Personal life and background ==
Ryan was born in Dublin in 1953 and educated at St. Mary's College, Rathmines; College of Commerce, Rathmines; and Kildalton Horticulture College, County Kilkenny.

Ryan comes from an Irish political family. His father, Eoin Ryan Snr, was a senator in Seanad Éireann for a number of years. Ryan's grandfather was James Ryan, a founding-member of Fianna Fáil and a long-serving cabinet minister. His great-aunts, language teacher Josephine Ryan and chemist Phyllis Ryan served in the GPO during the 1916 Easter Rising, and married respectively general and Fine Gael politician Richard Mulcahy and president of Ireland and Fianna Fáil politician Seán T. O'Kelly (who was the widower of his great-aunt Mary Kate Ryan); and his great-aunt Agnes McCullough, also an activist and member of Cumann na mBan, married Denis McCullough, Cumann na nGaedheal TD and musical entrepreneur.

== Political career ==
In 1985 he was elected to Dublin City Council. In 1989 he was nominated to Seanad Éireann by then Taoiseach Charles Haughey. Ryan was elected to Dáil Éireann for the first time at the 1992 general election. He was re-elected at the 1997 general election, topping the poll in the Dublin South-East constituency.

In February 2000 Ryan was appointed Minister of State at the Department of Tourism, Sport and Recreation. He was not re-appointed in 2002. In 2004 he was elected to the European Parliament for the Dublin constituency, sitting in the Union for Europe of the Nations group.

Ryan retired from national politics at the 2007 general election, opting to concentrate on European politics. He lost his seat at the 2009 European Parliament election.

Dáil	Election	Deputy (Party)	Deputy (Party)	Deputy (Party)	Deputy (Party)
13th	1948	John A. Costello (FG)	Seán MacEntee (FF)	Noël Browne (CnaP)	3 seats 1948–1981
14th	1951	John A. Costello (FG)	Seán MacEntee (FF)	Noël Browne (Ind.)	3 seats 1948–1981
15th	1954	John A. Costello (FG)	Seán MacEntee (FF)	John O'Donovan (FG)	3 seats 1948–1981
16th	1957	John A. Costello (FG)	Seán MacEntee (FF)	Noël Browne (Ind.)	3 seats 1948–1981
17th	1961	John A. Costello (FG)	Seán MacEntee (FF)	Noël Browne (NPD)	3 seats 1948–1981
18th	1965	John A. Costello (FG)	Seán MacEntee (FF)	Seán Moore (FF)	3 seats 1948–1981
19th	1969	Garret FitzGerald (FG)	Noël Browne (Lab)	Seán Moore (FF)	3 seats 1948–1981
20th	1973	Garret FitzGerald (FG)	Fergus O'Brien (FG)	Seán Moore (FF)	3 seats 1948–1981
21st	1977	Garret FitzGerald (FG)	Ruairi Quinn (Lab)	Seán Moore (FF)	3 seats 1948–1981
22nd	1981	Garret FitzGerald (FG)	Gerard Brady (FF)	Seán Moore (FF)	Richie Ryan (FG)
23rd	1982 (Feb)	Garret FitzGerald (FG)	Gerard Brady (FF)	Ruairi Quinn (Lab)	Alexis FitzGerald Jnr (FG)
24th	1982 (Nov)	Garret FitzGerald (FG)	Gerard Brady (FF)	Ruairi Quinn (Lab)	Joe Doyle (FG)
25th	1987	Garret FitzGerald (FG)	Gerard Brady (FF)	Ruairi Quinn (Lab)	Michael McDowell (PDs)
26th	1989	Garret FitzGerald (FG)	Gerard Brady (FF)	Ruairi Quinn (Lab)	Joe Doyle (FG)
27th	1992	Frances Fitzgerald (FG)	Eoin Ryan Jnr (FF)	Ruairi Quinn (Lab)	Michael McDowell (PDs)
28th	1997	Frances Fitzgerald (FG)	Eoin Ryan Jnr (FF)	Ruairi Quinn (Lab)	John Gormley (GP)
29th	2002	Michael McDowell (PDs)	Eoin Ryan Jnr (FF)	Ruairi Quinn (Lab)	John Gormley (GP)
30th	2007	Lucinda Creighton (FG)	Chris Andrews (FF)	Ruairi Quinn (Lab)	John Gormley (GP)
31st	2011	Lucinda Creighton (FG)	Eoghan Murphy (FG)	Ruairi Quinn (Lab)	Kevin Humphreys (Lab)
32nd	2016	Constituency abolished. See Dublin Bay South.			
