= List of members of the Irish Republican Brotherhood =

The following is a partial list of prominent members of the Irish Republican Brotherhood (IRB), circa 1858-1922.

- Maurice Ahern, member of the Cork branch.
- William O'Mera Allen
- Thomas Ashe, President of the Irish Republican Brotherhood from 1916 to 1917
- Michael Barrett
- Piaras Béaslaí
- James Bermingham
- Gerald Boland
- Harry Boland
- James Boland
- Hugh Brady (1896-1977), Paradise Ballynacally Clare Brigade, sentenced to death by firing squad Killadysert, escaped
- Patrick William Nally
- Éamonn Ceannt, a.k.a. Eamonn Kent
- Thomas J. Clarke, Treasurer at the time of the Easter Rising
- Cornelius Colbert
- Michael Collins
- James Connolly, socialist and labour leader, joined prior to the Easter Rising
- Patrick Curran, police informant
- Ned Daly
- Michael Davitt
- Éamon de Valera
- Seamus Deakin, President of the Irish Republican Brotherhood from 1913 to 1914
- Timothy Deasy
- John Devoy
- Charles Guilfoyle Doran
- Edward Duffy
- Thomas McCarthy Fennell
- William Goold
- Arthur Griffith
- Michael Grimes, Irish scientist and first Professor of Microbiology at University College Cork
- Bulmer Hobson
- Martin Hogan, member of the IRB who deserted from the British Army to join the Fenian uprising
- Thomas J. Kelly, President of the Irish Republican Brotherhood during 1866 and 1867.
- Luke Kennedy, joined 1898
- Charles Joseph Kickham, President of the Irish Republican Brotherhood from 1873 to 1882
- Michael Larkin
- Diarmuid Lynch
- Seán Mac Diarmada, a.k.a. Sean MacDermott, Secretary at the time of the Easter Rising
- Thomas MacDonagh
- Seán MacEoin, joined 1914. Minister for Justice 1948-1951, Minister for Defence 1953-1956.
- Eamon Martin
- Patrick McCartan
- Denis McCullough, President of the Irish Republican Brotherhood from 1915 to 1916
- Seán McGarry, President of the Irish Republican Brotherhood from 1917 until 1919
- Liam Mellows
- Michael McHugh, father of Maureen O'Carroll
- Denis Dowling Mulcahy
- John Mulholland, President of the Irish Republican Brotherhood from 1910 to 1912
- Neal O'Boyle, President of the Irish Republican Brotherhood from 1907 until 191.
- James Francis Xavier O'Brien, President of the Irish Republican Brotherhood from around 1869 until 1872
- John O'Connor, President of the Irish Republican Brotherhood from around 1882 to 1891
- Jeremiah O'Donovan Rossa
- John O'Leary, President of the Irish Republican Brotherhood from around 1891 to 1907
- John O'Mahony
- Garrett O'Shaughnessy
- Gearoid O'Sullivan
- Ted O'Sullivan
- Charles Stewart Parnell
- Patrick Pearse
- Joseph Mary Plunkett
- John O'Connor Power
- James Stephens
- James Wilson
- W. B. Yeats
