= Neillí Mulcahy =

Irish designer (1925 – 2012)

- Born: 27 February 1925; Dublin, Ireland
- Died: 6 May 2012 (aged 87); Dublin, Ireland
- Spouse: Tommy Bacon
- Children: 7 daughters
- Parent(s): Richard Mulcahy; Josephine Ryan

Neillí Mulcahy (27 February 1925 – 6 May 2012) was an Irish designer. In 1962, Mulcahy co-founded the Irish Haute Couture Group with Ib Jorgensen and Irene Gilbert.

== Family and education ==
Neillí Mulcahy was born in Dublin on 27 February 1925. She was the second youngest of the six children of General Richard Mulcahy, who was a commander-in-chief of the Irish army and a government minister for Fine Gael and Mary Josephine "Min" Ryan, a founding member of Cumann na mBan. She had two sisters and three brothers. On her maternal side she was related to a number of prominent figures in early Irish independence. Her aunts academic Mary Kate Ryan and chemist Phyllis Ryan were the first and second wives of Seán T. O'Kelly, second President of Ireland and her uncle was politician James Ryan. Mulcahy was educated at Loreto College, St Stephen's Green. She attended University College Dublin for a year, studying science, but left to attend dressmaking classes in St Mary's College of Domestic Science, Cathal Brugha Street. Having graduated from the Grafton Academy of Dress Designing, she went to Paris in 1951 to study at an academy there. She then spent six months training in the salon and workrooms of Jacques Heim.

Neillí married Tommy Bacon, a Dublin solicitor, on 28 April 1956. The couple had seven daughters.

== Career ==
Mulcahy returned to Dublin in 1952 and opened a couture workshop in South Frederick Street with three employees whom she trained. She received an award from Elsa Schiaparelli in 1953 as part of the National Agricultural and Industrial Development Association show (NAIDA). In 1955 she presented her first collection in the drawing room of her family home in Lissenfield, Rathmines, launching her career to great acclaim. Her clothes were denoted by her reworking of traditional Irish fabrics like wool and tweed, a common theme in Irish couture of the 1950s. Mulcahy worked with William McNutt of the McNutt Weaving Company and Emily Wynne of Avoca Handweavers on new colours, finishes, and techniques of linen and tweed. She designed tailored wool suits which were known for being easy to wear and had simple designs. Mulcahy insisted that like men, women's suits needed pockets. She used fine knitted or woven woollen materials by Michael McInerny, London, using bright colours that were more popular in the United States than Ireland.

Her aunt, Phyllis Ryan wore Mulcahy's dresses and ballgowns while accompanying her husband Seán T. O'Kelly at events in Ireland and abroad during the time he served as President of Ireland. One such time was at the first visit of the Irish President to the United States in 1959. Mulcahy also benefited from the success in the United States of fellow Irish designer, Sybil Connolly, with her exporting most of her output to American and German markets. Mulcahy presented her 1967 collection on a transatlantic liner, and at a society luncheon fashion event in Chicago in 1968 her designs were exhibited. She founded the Irish Haute Couture Group with Irene Gilbert and Ib Jorgensen in 1962 to promote Irish fashion to foreign markets. Mulcahy won a number of contracts to supply women's uniform suits, including Great Southern Hotels, Allied Irish Banks staff, CIÉ train hostesses, and Shannon Duty Free shop staff. Many of these suits were made by the ready-made department of Mulcahy Redmond, which were of no family relation. One of her most celebrated uniforms was her 1963 Aer Lingus air hostesses, made in Kelly green tweed.

By the 1960s couture became old-fashioned and was seen as too expensive, and Mulcahy's company was unable to adapt to off the hanger clothes. Even her use of Irish fabrics became a sign that her designs were dated, and ultimately unappealing to younger women. She was critical of the government for not supporting the Irish fashion industry, which was subject to extra heavy duties when exported. On 1 July 1969, she closed her workshop. She continued as a designer, working with at least one retailer designing tweed garments, and was an adviser on fashion and garment production to the government. She maintained her links with the Grafton Academy, judging graduating student collections, aiding in the development of a large number of upcoming designers.

== Death and legacy ==
Mulcahy donated her archive to the National Museum of Ireland. In 1996, her work was featured in an exhibition in the Ulster Museum curated by Elizabeth McCrum. The National Museum exhibited a retrospective of her work in 2007. She died on 6 May 2012 in Dublin and is buried in Mount Venus cemetery.
