= Nell Ryan =

Irish nationalist (1881–1959)

- Born: Ellen Ryan; 5 July 1881; Tomcoole, Wexford, Ireland
- Died: 8 December 1959 (aged 78); Wexford, Ireland
- Relatives: James Ryan (brother); Josephine Ryan (sister); Mary Kate Ryan (sister); Agnes McCullough (sister); Phyllis Ryan (sister)

Ellen Ryan (5 July 1881 – 8 December 1959) was an Irish nationalist, Cumann na mBan organiser and County Councillor. She was a member of the republican Ryan family of Tomcoole. Despite not being involved in the 1916 Rising, she was arrested and imprisoned. On release she joined Sinn Féin and was a regional organiser for Cumann na mBan in Wexford. She was arrested for anti-Treaty activity during the Civil War and went on hunger strike with other female prisoners. She was the first woman elected to Wexford County Council.

== Early life and family ==
Ellen "Nell" Ryan was born on 5 July 1881 in Tomcoole, County Wexford to John and Eliza (née Sutton) Ryan. She was one of twelve siblings, all of whom received secondary school education and nine went on to university. Nell was educated as a boarder at Loreto College, Dublin. She became a teacher and taught in San Sebastián, Spain and Fulda, Germany for some years before returning to Ireland.

Ryan and her family "played an important role in revolutionary politics and helped shape the new Free State." Her sister Josephine was a founding member and secretary of Cumann na mBan and her sisters Phyllis, Mary Kate and Agnes were also members. Their brother James joined the Irish Volunteers. He later became a politician, serving as a Minister in successive Fianna Fáil governments, and was later elected to Seanad Éireann. He married Máirín Cregan, a member of Cumann na mBan. Josephine married Richard Mulcahy, commander in chief of the Irish Republican Army and later a Minister in the Fine Gael government. Agnes married Denis McCullough, president of the Irish Republican Brotherhood. Kit married Seán T. O'Kelly, future President of Ireland, who went on to marry Phyllis after Mary Kate's death at 55. Ryan was a "friend and confidant of practically every leader in the Republican movement."

== 1916 Rising ==
Ryan joined Cumann na mBan in 1914 and was a regional organiser in Wexford. She was in Wexford when the Easter Rising began. Her siblings Min, Phyllis and Jim were stationed at the GPO in Dublin. Despite not being involved herself, Nell was arrested in Enniscorthy along with other Cumann na mBan members after the Rising. She was held initially in Waterford Barracks with Kathleen Browne and subsequently moved to Richmond Barracks in Dublin.

Ryan was one of the few women who were subsequently deported to Lewes Prison, England, along with Winifred Carney, Helena Molony, Marie Perotz-Flanagan, Bríd Foley and Countess Markievicz. She was one of the longest serving prisoners and was eventually released on 13 October 1916. A later profile of her suggests that "her character with Dublin Castle even then, must not have been good". On her return to Ireland, Ryan resumed her activities with Cumann na mBan, where she reorganised and expanded branches in Wexford. She also joined Sinn Féin.

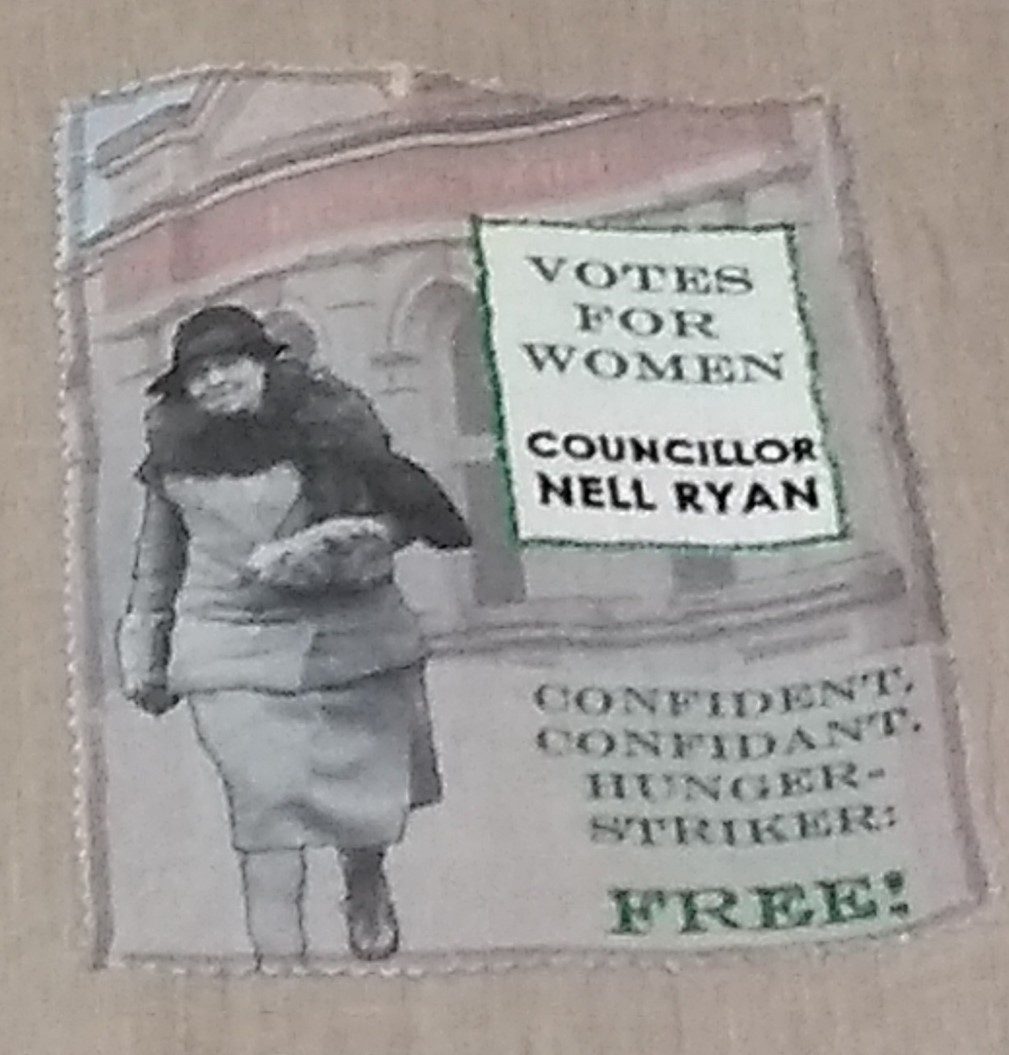
Panel from the 77 Women commemoration quilt depicting Nell Ryan. Taken in Richmond Barracks, 2019.

Ryan is commemorated in the 77 Women commemoration quilt created by The Yarn Project in honour of the women arrested and held in Richmond Barracks after the Rising.

== War of Independence ==
Ryan was living in Tomcoole during the War of Independence and the family home became a headquarters for the Irish Volunteers.

== Civil War ==
During the Civil War that followed the partition of Ireland, WT Cosgrave, then President of the Executive of the Free State Government, recognised the role of the Cumann na mBan women in propaganda and communication and arrested hundreds of them, saying that it was “not possible to consider these women as ordinary females”.

Ryan was a dispatch rider during the war and was among those arrested for anti-Treaty activities. She was transferred from Wexford to Kilmainham Gaol. Although her sister Min was married to General Richard Mulcahy, Chief of Staff of the National Army, she did not receive preferential treatment. With other members of Cumann na mBan, she began a hunger strike in March 1923. The Free State authorities did not want any women to die on hunger strike, so she was released on 24 April, the 34th day of her strike.

"Nell Ryan and Miss [Annie] O'Neill were released, a few days later Madame [Maud Gonne] MacBride was gone. That same night Kitty Costello was told by the doctor that she was unconditionally released."

The Civil War had a huge impact on the Ryan family as Min backed her husband's support of the Treaty, as did her sister Agnes, but Nell and the other siblings were anti-Treaty. Unlike some families divided by the Civil War, the Ryans later managed to heal the division. Her friendship with Kathleen Browne, who had been arrested with Ryan after the Rising and who later supported the Treaty, did not survive the Civil War.

== Later life ==
Ryan became a member of Fianna Fáil when it was established in 1926 and served on its national executive, representing south Wexford. She was active in local politics and joined the Wexford Harbour Board, Wexford Vocational Educational Committee and the Wexford Board of Health. As Chair of the Board of Health, she had responsibility for managing social services and hospitals. She was the first women elected to Wexford County Council and served as Councillor from 1928 to 1954.

She also served on the council of Uí Cinsealaigh Historical Society.

She died aged 78 in a nursing home in Wexford on 8 December 1959. At her funeral, members of Cumann na mBan formed a guard of honour and her coffin was draped in the tricolour of the Irish Republic. She is buried in Glynn Cemetery.
