= Eoin Ryan =

Eoin Ryan may refer to:

- Eoin Ryan Snr (1920–2001), Irish Fianna Fáil politician, senator 1957–1987
- His son Eoin Ryan Jnr (born 1953), Irish Fianna Fáil politician, Member of the European Parliament, former Teachta Dála (TD)
