= Kathleen Browne =

Irish politician and writer (1878–1943)

Senator
- In office 20 June 1929 – 29 May 1936

Personal details
- Born: Kathleen Anne Browne; 1 October 1878 Bridgetown, County Wexford, Ireland
- Died: 9 October 1943 (aged 65) County Wexford, Ireland
- Party: Cumann na nGaedheal

Kathleen Anne Browne (1 October 1878 – 9 October 1943) was an Irish politician, farmer, writer, historian and archaeologist. She was arrested after the Easter Rising and held in Kilmainham Gaol. During the Civil War, she was Pro-Treaty and joined Cumann na nGaedheal. She was a member of Seanad Éireann from 1929 to 1936. She was a fluent speaker of Yola, an Anglic language of Wexford.

== Early life ==
Browne was born on 1 October 1878 to Michael Browne, a farmer, shopkeeper and local politician, and Mary Eleanor Stafford. She was the eldest of five children. Her father's family was of Norman extraction and had lived at Rathcronan Castle since the 13th century. Her mother's family lived in Baldwinstown Castle, County Wexford. Michael Browne was a poor law guardian and a member of Wexford's first County Council. He supported Home Rule and had worked with Charles Stewart Parnell.

Browne was educated at a convent school in Wexford. As a child, she shared her father's interest in politics and was a young member of the Kilmore branch of the Ladies' Land League. She was a romantic nationalist and loved to dress in Celtic clothing and pose with an Irish wolfhound. she was secretary of the county committee of the Gaelic League.

Browne became an agriculturist and expert in dairy management. She lectured with the Department of Agriculture and Technical Instruction for Ireland. She was one of the first farmers in Ireland to grow sugar beet and was on the executive of the Beet Growers Association, as well as the Loch Garman Cooperative Society, the Wexford Agricultural Society and the Irish Farmers' Union. She took over the management of the family farm when her father died in 1912.

== Political activity ==
Browne joined Sinn Féin in 1912 and the Irish Volunteers in 1914 and flew a tricolour from her family home, Rathronan Castle, during the Easter Rising. She was arrested and imprisoned in Kilmainham and Mountjoy prisons, along with her friend Nell Ryan. She took the Pro-Treaty side during the Civil War, joining Cumann na nGaedheal. Ryan was Anti-Treaty and their friendship did not survive the Civil War.

She was elected to Seanad Éireann of the Irish Free State as a Cumann na nGaedheal member, at a by-election on 20 June 1929. The by-election was caused by the death of Alice Stopford Green. She was re-elected for three years in 1931 and was re-elected for nine years in 1934.

She joined the Army Comrades Association, known as the Blueshirts, in 1933. Partly because she wore her blue blouse (the garb of the ACA) in the Seanad and the Dáil during this period, the wearing of political uniforms was banned in both houses. Browne claimed not be a fascist, but had joined ranks with the ACA because she shared their Anti-Communist and Republican viewpoints. Following the merger of the Blueshirts into Fine Gael, she remained a part of the Fine Gael faction rather than continuing to follow O'Duffy's ventures such as the National Corporate Party.

At this point she seemed to gravitate more towards the new Fine Gael leader W. T. Cosgrave, who she became personal friends with. She served as a senator until 29 May 1936 when the Free State Seanad was abolished.

== Historical and conservation activity ==
Browne was a member of the Wexford Library committee, the Royal Society of Antiquaries of Ireland, the Society for the Preservation of the Memorials of the Dead, and the Uí Cinnsealaigh Historical Society. She wrote widely on the history and antiquities of County Wexford, with a particular interest in the Norman period and the castles of County Wexford. Her Short History of County Wexford was approved as a textbook for schools by the Department of Education in 1927.

Browne was also a naturalist and was instrumental in having the Great Saltee Island conserved as a bird sanctuary in 1938.

=== Yola ===
Browne was a fluent speaker of Yola, an extinct English dialect once commonly spoken in parts of Wexford. She wrote a number of articles about it, including The Ancient Dialect of the Baronies of Forth and Bargy in 1927.

== Death ==
Browne died in a nursing home on 9 October 1943, eight days after her 65th birthday. The Kathleen Browne Festival is held every year to honour Browne in her hometown of Bridgetown.
