= Agnes McCullough =

Irish teacher, philanthropist and activist (1888–1967)

- Born: Agnes Ryan; 24 December 1888; Tomcoole, Wexford, Ireland
- Died: 31 March 1967 (aged 78); Ranelagh, Dublin, Ireland
- Spouse: Denis McCullough
- Children: 6
- Relatives: James Ryan (brother); Phyllis Ryan (sister); Mary Kate Ryan (sister); Josephine Ryan (sister); Nell Ryan (sister)

Agnes McCullough (née Ryan, 24 December 1888 – 31 March 1967) was an Irish teacher, philanthropist and activist.

== Early life and family ==
She was born in 1888 at Tomcoole, County Wexford. She was the ninth child and sixth daughter of John Ryan, strong farmer, and Elizabeth (née Sutton). She attended schools at Glynn, County Wexford, Loreto Abbey in Gorey, and Darmstadt, Germany, going on to spend some time in Belgium. She went on to attend University College Dublin (UCD) graduating with a BA in modern languages, and an MA in Old Irish under the supervision of Osborn Bergin in 1913. Along with other members of her family, McCullough was active in Sinn Féin and the Gaelic League. She moved to Belfast to teach at St Mary's Training College for teachers in 1913. In 1914 she founded a Belfast branch of Cumann na mBan.

While in Belfast, she met Denis McCullough, with the couple marrying on 16 August 1916 after his release from detention for his role in the Easter Rising. It was a double wedding, with Christina Mary "Chris" Ryan marrying Michael O'Malley in Tomcoole. They lived in Belfast initially, with McCullough remaining active in Cumann na mBan and running the family's musical instrument business while her husband was repeatedly imprisoned. They had four sons, Donal, Mairtín, Donnacha and Seosamh, and two daughters, Máiread and Úna Patricia. Their correspondence from this period is included in the McCullough papers in the UCD archives. McCullough also served as a Belfast poor law guardian, and participated in the September 1921 anti-partition delegation of Belfast nationalists who met with Éamon de Valera in the Mansion House, Dublin. Due to the Belfast boycott, their business suffered, leading to family moving to Dublin in December 1921 following Denis' release from Ballykinlar internment camp. Setting up their music shop on Dawson Street.

== Activism ==
Once in Dublin, McCullough was active in a number of charities such as Saor an Leanbh (the Irish Save the Children fund) and the Catholic Social Services Council. She was appointed vice-chairman of the statutory trade boards in 1941, a board that was composed of employer and employee representatives, fixing rates for particular industries. She also volunteered for the Dublin Rheumatism Clinic, the Incorporated Orthopaedic Hospital of Ireland, and Coombe Hospital Linen Guild. She was an active member of the women's section of the National Agricultural and Industrial Development Association. She ran unsuccessfully for the NUI Seanad Éireann constituency in 1954. The McCulloughs had been pro-treaty in 1922, which lead to them being closer to her brother-in-law Seán T. O'Kelly than some other members of the extended Ryan family. The couple attended O'Kelly's second presidential inauguration in 1952, and accompanied the president on a visit to Rome in March 1957. McCullough spoke about her concern of the effect of television on children at a meeting of Saor an Leanbh in 1962.

== Death and legacy ==
McCullough died suddenly at home in Ranelagh, Dublin on 31 March 1967. Her Irish Times obituary commented "She believed that women should take part in public affairs, but she was womanly to the core in her actions and in her feelings." Papers relating to McCullough are included in the Ryan family papers in the National Library of Ireland.
