= 1924 Donegal by-election =

By-election to the 4th Dáil

- 20 November 1924
- Turnout: 43,290 (44.7%)
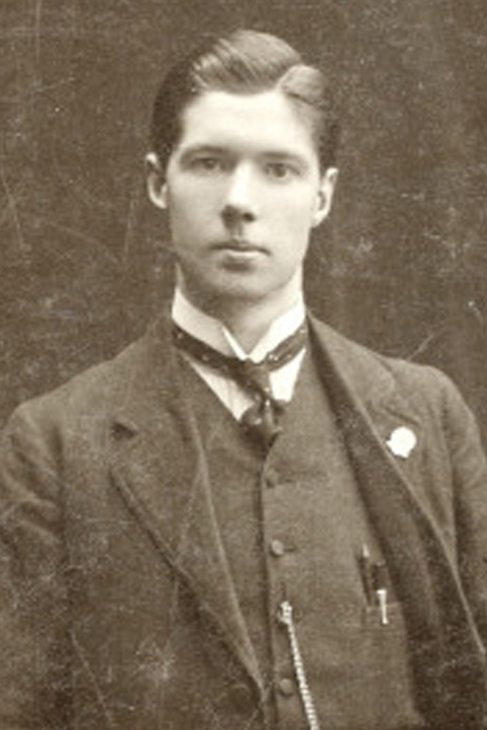
		Daly
Nominee	Denis McCullough	Thomas Daly
Party	Cumann na nGaedheal	Republican
First preferences	24,919	18,371
Percentage	57.6%	42.4%
TD before election
Peter J. Ward
Cumann na nGaedheal
TD after election
Denis McCullough
Cumann na nGaedheal

A Dáil by-election was held in the constituency of Donegal in the Irish Free State on Thursday, 20 November 1924, to fill a vacancy in the 4th Dáil. Donegal was an eight seat constituency consisting of the administrative county of County Donegal.

Cumann na nGaedheal TD Peter J. Ward resigned on 1 August 1924. The writ of election to fill the vacancy was agreed by the Dáil on 28 October 1924. It was one of five by-elections agreed that day. The Cumann na nGaedheal candidate, Denis McCullough, was a former president of the Irish Republican Brotherhood who had unsuccessfully contested the 1918 general election and the 1921 election.

== Result ==
The by-election was held on 20 November 1924. It was the fifth by-election held that week, following the November 1924 Dublin South by-election, the 1924 Mayo North by-election, the 1924 Cork East by-election, and the 1924 Cork Borough by-election. It was won by Denis McCullough.

1924 Donegal by-election
Party	Candidate	FPv%	Count
Party	Candidate	FPv%	1
Cumann na nGaedheal	Denis McCullough	57.6	24,919
Republican	Thomas Daly	42.4	18,371
Electorate: 96,977 Valid: 43,290 Quota: 21,646 Turnout: 44.7%

McCullough took his seat in Dáil Éireann on 26 November, after taking the Oath of Allegiance required under Article 17 of the Constitution of the Irish Free State. McCullough did not contest the June 1927 general election and did not stand for election again.
