= Máirín Cregan =

Irish nationalist and writer

- Born: Mary Ellen Cregan; 27 March 1891; Killorglin, County Kerry, Ireland
- Died: 9 November 1975 (aged 84); Greystones, County Wicklow, Ireland
- Occupations: Nationalist, Writer
- Spouse: James Ryan (m. 1919)
- Children: 3, including Eoin
- Writing career
- Pen name: Máirín Ní Chriagáin, Máirín Cregan, Mrs James Ryan, Máirín Ryan

Máirín Cregan (27 March 1891 – 9 November 1975) was an Irish nationalist who was involved in the 1916 Easter Rising and Irish War of Independence. She later made her name writing for children, as well as writing plays and novels for adults.

== Early life ==
Mary Ellen Cregan was born on 27 March 1891 in Killorglin, County Kerry to Morgan Cregan and Ellen O'Shea. Her father was a stonemason from Limerick. The family were strong believers in the Gaelic revival movement and Cregan herself learned Irish and performed songs at Gaelic League concerts. Although she went to primary school locally, she went away to secondary school to St. Louis Convent in Carrickmacross, County Monaghan. After finishing school, Cregan became a teacher, working in Goresbridge, County Kilkenny from 1911 to 1914.

== Republican involvement ==
In September 1914 she went to Dublin to study music in the Leinster School of Music, under Madame Coslett Heller. It was while she was in Dublin that she became friends with the Ryan family, who were strong nationalists as well as interested in the Gaelic League and Sinn Féin. She began to sing for concerts which were fundraisers for the Irish Volunteers. The last concert was just two weeks before the Easter Rising.

During Easter week she was sent to Tralee with "automatics and ammunition" by Seán Mac Diarmada. While she was carrying a violin case of munitions, Cregan was also carrying details for the wireless technology needed for communicating with the Aud, the boat which was carrying more weapons for the rebellion. The communications with the Aud went wrong when the car carrying the Volunteers went off a pier and the occupants were drowned. Cregan was still in the area to assist with the surviving Volunteer, who unfortunately knew nothing of the details for the Aud. She wasn't easily able to get back to Dublin, because owing to the Rising the city was cut off. By the time she got back, her friends had been arrested.

Like many of the teachers, she lost her job after the rising because of her connection to the rebels. However, she was able to get new positions over the next few years in both Ballyshannon and Portstewart until she married. In Ballyshannon she experienced the early expressions of support and sympathy, but Portstewart was a Unionist enclave with many houses flying union flags on polling day in 1918.

Cregan was a member of Cumann na mBan and with them was active during the Irish War of Independence. She was given a medal for her participation. In July 1919 she married James Ryan whose whole family had been deeply involved in the Easter Rising, as well as the Irish War of Independence and the Irish Civil War. They had three children, Eoin who became a Senator, Nuala (Colgan) and Seamus.

The family was initially based in Wexford during the War. The house was often raided when the British soldiers were looking for her husband and Cregan herself was arrested in February 1921 for refusing to put up Martial law posters. Later the family sold the house, and remained mobile while she worked for the Sinn Féin Government and her husband was in prison. It was during this time that she worked as a courier to the continent and to London.

After the war, they bought Kindlestown House in Delgany, County Wicklow where they remained.

== Writing ==
Cregan worked as a journalist for The Irish Press and The Sunday Press. Her political awareness and involvement meant that her work there was on political articles.

Her first book for children was Old John and gained Cregan considerable international success and attention. Sean Eoin was also published in Irish, and was illustrated by Jack Butler Yeats. Her work was also aired on the BBC and RTÉ. Rathina won the Downey Award in the United States in 1943.

== Bibliography ==
=== Novels for children ===
- Old John ( Published as Sean-Eoin in the Irish language Version, 1938) Reprinted 1974.
- Rathina

=== Children's plays ===
- Seamus and the Robber
- Seamus and the Tinker

=== Plays for adults ===
- Hunger Strike (1933)
- Curlew’s Call (1940)
