= Mary Kate Ryan =

Irish academic (1878–1934)

- Born: 31 October 1878; Taghmon, County Wexford, Ireland
- Died: 18 July 1934 (aged 55); Bad Nauheim, Germany
- Education: Royal University of Ireland; Girton College, Cambridge
- Spouse: Seán T. O'Kelly (m. 1918–1934)
- Relatives: James Ryan (brother); Josephine Ryan (sister); Phyllis Ryan (sister); Agnes McCullough (sister); Nell Ryan (sister)

Mary Kate Ryan (31 October 1878 – 18 July 1934) was an Irish academic and the first woman lecturer in University College Dublin's French Department as well as being a political activist who was involved in Ireland's Easter Rising, War of Independence, and Civil War.

== Early life and education ==
Mary Kate Ryan was born on 31 October 1878, in the townland of Tomcoole, near Taghmon, County Wexford. Her parents were John Ryan, who was a farmer, and his wife Elizabeth Sutton. There were twelve children and Ryan was the second oldest. Ryan was often called 'Kit', or 'Cáit' by those who knew her well. Her eldest sibling was Joanna who went to join the Loreto nuns and was known as Mother Stanislaus. She was known for ensuring girls were given the opportunity to attend university and had a place to live. Ryan was a supporter, with her family, of both the Gaelic League and Sinn Féin. One of Ryan's brothers, Fr Martin Ryan, was exposed to the ideas while studying in Maynooth and brought them home. A close friend was Seán T. O'Kelly who was another influence on her nationalism.

Ryan got her primary education locally and attended the Loreto Abbey in Gorey, County Wexford, before going to Dublin to study in the Loreto College, St Stephen's Green. Ryan joined the Loreto Hall Literary and Debating Society and was a prominent member there. She got her degree in modern languages from the Royal University of Ireland in 1902. Ryan then continued her studies in Girton College, Cambridge where she qualified as a teacher. After completing her education Ryan taught languages in a number of schools in Great Britain. These included High School at St Andrews, Scotland, at a school in Bedford, and in a school in London. While in London, Ryan was an acquaintance of Tom Kettle. She returned to Ireland in 1909. Ryan became a lecturer in languages at University College Dublin.

== Activism ==
While living in Dublin and working in UCD, Ryan's house became a centre for nationalists and Irish cultural supporters. She was an active member during the Easter Rising in Dublin, serving in the General Post Office during the week, and was jailed in Mountjoy Prison before being released on health grounds. UCD indicated they were concerned that she was using her lectures and time as a lecturer on campus to spread her beliefs among the students.

Ryan married Seán T. O'Kelly on 1 April 1918 in Rathmines. She began working for Dáil Éireann during the War of Independence. She worked as a translator and interpreter for her husband on his diplomatic trip to the 1919 Paris Peace Conference. She travelled to Germany in 1921. Ryan was in Germany when the Anglo-Irish Treaty was signed. The Ryan family did not agree with each other on the treaty and Mary Kate Ryan was strongly against it. She fell out with her sister Min Ryan as her husband, Richard Mulcahy, was part of the Pro-Treaty government.

== Later life ==
After the Irish Civil War ended, Ryan was vice-president of the UCD Republican Club. Despite the earlier concerns of the administration Ryan had continued to work for the university. In fact, in addition to her other activities, from 1913 to 1918, Ryan had been acting Professor of her department after the death of a Professor Cadic.

In the 1930s, she developed rheumatic heart disease. She retired from work and began using a wheelchair in 1934. Ryan looked for treatments for her illness and travelled to Bad Nauheim, Germany. She was there with her husband and some friends when she died on 18 July 1934. In 1936, Seán O'Kelly married his late wife's younger sister, Phyllis Ryan, after gaining a papal dispensation to do so.
