= James Ryan (Irish politician) =

Irish politician (1892–1970)

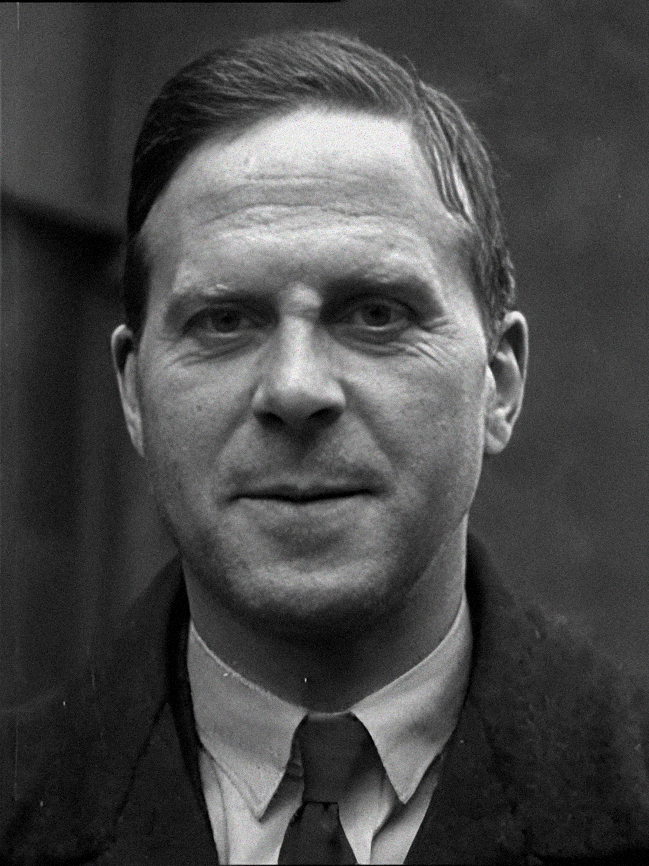
- Ryan in 1933

Minister for Finance
- In office 20 March 1957 – 21 April 1965
- Taoiseach: Éamon de Valera; Seán Lemass
- Preceded by: Gerard Sweetman
- Succeeded by: Jack Lynch

Minister for Health
- In office 13 June 1951 – 2 June 1954
- Taoiseach: Éamon de Valera
- Preceded by: John A. Costello
- Succeeded by: Tom O'Higgins
- In office 22 January 1947 – 18 February 1948
- Taoiseach: Éamon de Valera
- Preceded by: New office
- Succeeded by: Noël Browne

Minister for Social Welfare
- In office 13 June 1951 – 2 June 1954
- Taoiseach: Éamon de Valera
- Preceded by: William Norton
- Succeeded by: Brendan Corish
- In office 22 January 1947 – 18 February 1948
- Taoiseach: Éamon de Valera
- Preceded by: New office
- Succeeded by: William Norton

Minister for Agriculture
- In office 9 March 1932 – 21 January 1947
- Taoiseach: Éamon de Valera
- Preceded by: Patrick Hogan
- Succeeded by: Paddy Smith

Senator
- In office 23 June 1965 – 5 November 1969
- Constituency: Nominated by the Taoiseach

Teachta Dála
- In office August 1923 – April 1965
- In office May 1921 – June 1922
- Constituency: Wexford
- In office December 1918 – May 1921
- Constituency: South Wexford

Personal details
- Born: 6 December 1892 Taghmon, County Wexford, Ireland
- Died: 25 September 1970 (aged 77) Greystones, County Wicklow, Ireland
- Party: Fianna Fáil
- Other political affiliations: Sinn Féin (to 1926)
- Spouse: Máirín Cregan (m. 1919–1970)
- Children: 2, including Eoin
- Relatives: Mary Kate Ryan (sister); Josephine Ryan (sister); Phyllis Ryan (sister); Agnes Ryan (sister); Nell Ryan (sister); James Ryan (great-grandson)
- Education: University College Dublin

Military service
- Branch/service: Irish Volunteers; Irish Republican Brotherhood; Irish Republican Army
- Battles/wars: Easter Rising; Irish Civil War

British Army intelligence file for James Ryan

James Ryan (6 December 1892 – 25 September 1970) was an Irish medical doctor, revolutionary and politician who served in every Fianna Fáil government from 1932 to 1965, successively as Minister for Agriculture (1932–1947), Health and Social Welfare (1947–1948 and 1951–1954), and Finance (1957–1965). He served as a Teachta Dála (TD) for Wexford from 1918 to 1922 and 1923 to 1965, and as senator from 1965 to 1969. He was a member of Sinn Féin until he joined Fianna Fáil upon that party's foundation in 1926.

== Early and private life ==
Ryan was born on the family farm at Tomcoole, near Taghmon, County Wexford, in 1892. The second-youngest of twelve children, he was educated at St Peter's College, Wexford, and Ring College, Waterford. In 1911, he won a county council scholarship to University College Dublin where he studied medicine.

In March 1917 Jim Ryan, as he was always known by his comrades, passed his final medical examinations; that June he set up medical practice in Wexford town. In 1921 Ryan moved to Dublin where he opened a doctor's practice at Harcourt Street, specialising in skin diseases at the Skin and Cancer Hospital on Holles Street. He left medicine in 1925, after he bought Kindlestown, a large farm near Delgany, County Wicklow. Ryan lived there and it remained a working farm until his death.

In July 1919, Ryan married Máirín Cregan, originally from County Kerry and a close friend of Sinéad de Valera throughout her life. Cregan, like her husband, had also fought in the Easter Rising and was subsequently an author of children's stories in Irish. They had three children together.

One of Ryan's sisters, Mary Kate, married Seán T. O'Kelly, one of Ryan's future cabinet colleagues and a future President of Ireland. Following her death O'Kelly married her sister, Phyllis Ryan. Another of Ryan's sisters, Josephine ('Min') Ryan, married Richard Mulcahy, a future leader of Fine Gael. Another sister, Agnes, married Denis McCullough, a Cumann na nGaedheal TD from 1924 to 1927. He is also the great-grandfather of Ireland and Leinster Rugby player James Ryan

== Revolutionary career ==
While studying at university in 1913 Ryan joined the Gaelic League at Clonmel. The company commander recruited the young Catholic nationalist, who became a founder-member of the Irish Volunteers and was sworn into the Irish Republican Brotherhood the following year. In 1916 he went first to Cork to deliver a message from Seán Mac Diarmada to Tomás Mac Curtain that the Easter Rising was due to happen on Easter Sunday, then to Cork again in a 12-hour journey in a car driven by MacNeill's brother James to deliver Eoin MacNeill's cancellation order, which attempted to stop the Easter Rising, but then, from when he arrived back on Tuesday, served as the medical officer in the General Post Office (GPO) and treated many wounds, including James Connolly's shattered ankle, a wound which gradually turned gangrenous. He was, along with Connolly, one of the last people to leave the GPO when the evacuation took place. Following the surrender of the garrison Ryan was deported to HM Prison Stafford in England and subsequently Frongoch internment camp. He was released in August 1916.

Ryan rejoined the Volunteers immediately after his release from prison, and in June 1917, he was elected Commandant of the Wexford Battalion. His political career began the following year when he was elected as a Sinn Féin candidate for the constituency of Wexford South in the 1918 general election. Like his fellow Sinn Féin MPs, Ryan refused to attend the Westminster Parliament. Instead he attended the proceedings of the First Dáil on 21 January 1919. As the War of Independence went on, Ryan became Brigade Commandant of South Wexford and was also elected to Wexford County Council, serving as chairman on one occasion. In September 1919, he was arrested by the British and interned on Spike Island and later Bere Island. In February 1921, Ryan was imprisoned at Kilworth Internment Camp, County Cork. He was later moved on Ballykinlar Barracks in Co Down and released in August 1921.

In the 1922 "pact election" Ryan and one of the other two anti-Treaty Wexford TDs lost their seats to pro-Treaty candidates. During the Civil War, Jim Ryan was arrested and held in Mountjoy Prison before being transferred to Tintown Camp, The Curragh where he embarked on a 36-day hunger strike. Whilst interned he won back his Dáil seat as an abstentionist at the 1923 general election. He was released from prison in December 1923.

== Political career ==
In 1926, Ryan was among the Sinn Féin TDs who followed leader Éamon de Valera out of the party to found Fianna Fáil. They entered the Dáil in 1927 and spent five years on the opposition benches.

=== Minister for Agriculture ===
Following the 1932 general election, Fianna Fáil came to office and Ryan was appointed as Minister for Agriculture, a position he held for fifteen years. In agriculture, the government's policy was based on the idea of self-sufficiency or autarky. "Irish farmers should have always been looking for prosperity from the towns of Britain. If they got people working in our own towns they would consume Irish produce," he declared at Blackwater, County Wexford calling it the idea of a cyclical arrangement.

Ryan was given the task of implementing the following policies: imports of wheat, sugar and other agricultural produce were restricted; farmers were given a guaranteed price for wheat; farmers were forced to use home-produced grain in animal feed and bakers had to use a certain percentage of Irish flour in their bread; and the sugar beet industry was expanded with the opening of new factories.

While these policies saw increases in sugar-beet and wheat production, the small farmers of Munster and Connacht gained little, while the large farmers were the real beneficiaries. Ryan faced severe criticism over the Economic War with Britain: serious harm was done to the cattle trade, Ireland's main export earner. The government tried to compensate by giving bounties equal to the British duties, however, these had to be paid for by the taxpayer. The economic war ended in 1938 with the signing of the Anglo-Irish Trade Agreement between both governments, after a series of talks in London between the British Prime Minister Neville Chamberlain, de Valera, Ryan and Seán Lemass.

During World War II, self-sufficiency in food became essential. The Department of Agriculture ordered every farmer to till one-eighth of his land. This was raised to three-eighths in 1944. In spite of strict rationing and severe shortages, basic foodstuffs remained available. At the war's end, farmers discontent emerged once again. A new political party, Clann na Talmhan, had been established in the late 1930s to represent the interests of smaller farmers in the west of Ireland. Also, much of the country's land had become exhausted due to increased wartime productivity and a shortage of fertilisers.

As Minister for Agriculture, Ryan was also involved the handover of Johnstown Castle estate, County Wexford in 1945. The facility became an important soil research centre initially under the Department for Agriculture and later as An Foras Talúntais (now Teagasc).

=== Minister for Health and Social Welfare ===
In 1947, after spending fifteen years as Minister for Agriculture, Ryan was appointed to the newly created positions of Minister for Health and Minister for Social Welfare. The minister brought the draft Health Bill to the cabinet's attention later that year. This legislation proposed to modernise the health service into two aspects – mother and child welfare and infectious diseases. De Valera was anxious about accepting these measures as government policy due to opposition from the Catholic Church. In fact, much of the legislation was enacted by Noel Browne, Ryan's successor as Minister from 1948 to 1951. Following Fianna Fáil's return to power at the 1951 general election, Ryan returned as Minister for Health and Social Welfare. During his second period in office he clashed with the Church once again over the implementation of the remaining aspects of the Mother and Child Scheme. Following negotiations with the hierarchy, adjustments on such issues as means testing and medical inspections were made and the legislation was passed in the Dáil. Following the 1954 general election, Fianna Fáil lost power and Ryan moved to the backbenches once again.

=== Minister for Finance ===
Following the 1957 general election, Fianna Fáil were back in office and de Valera's cabinet had a new look to it. In a clear message that there would be a change to economic policy Ryan, a close ally of Seán Lemass, was appointed Minister for Finance, replacing the conservative Seán MacEntee. The first sign of a new economic approach came in 1958, when Ryan brought the First Programme for Economic Development to the cabinet table. This plan, the brainchild of T. K. Whitaker, recognised that Ireland would have to move away from self-sufficiency towards free trade. It also proposed that foreign firms should be given grants and tax breaks to set up in Ireland.

When Seán Lemass succeeded de Valera as Taoiseach in 1959, Ryan was re-appointed as Minister for Finance. Lemass wanted to reward him for his loyalty by also naming him Tánaiste; however, the new leader felt obliged to appoint Seán MacEntee, one of the party elders to the position. Ryan continued to implement the First Programme throughout the early 1960s, achieving a record growth rate of 4 per cent by 1963. That year an even more ambitious Second Programme was introduced; however, it overreached and had to be abandoned. In spite of this, the annual growth rate averaged five per cent, the highest achieved since independence.

== Retirement and death ==
Ryan did not stand in the 1965 general election, after which he was nominated by the Taoiseach to Seanad Éireann, where he joined his son, Eoin Ryan Snr. At the 1969 dissolution he retired to his farm at Kindlestown in County Wicklow, where he died at age 77 on 25 September 1970. His grandson Eoin Ryan Jnr served in the Oireachtas from 1989 to 2007 and later in the European Parliament from 2004 to 2009. His great-grandson, also called James Ryan, is a professional rugby player who has represented Ireland and Leinster.

Parliament of the United Kingdom
Preceded by Peter Ffrench	Member of Parliament for South Wexford; 1918–1922	Constituency abolished
Oireachtas
New constituency	Teachta Dála for South Wexford; 1918–1921	Constituency abolished
Political offices
Preceded by Patrick Hogan	Minister for Agriculture; 1932–1947	Succeeded by Paddy Smith
New office	Minister for Health; 1947–1948	Succeeded by Noël Browne
New office	Minister for Social Welfare; 1947–1948	Succeeded by Tom O'Higgins
Preceded by John A. Costello	Minister for Health; 1951–1954	Succeeded by Tom O'Higgins
Preceded by William Norton	Minister for Social Welfare; 1951–1954	Succeeded by Brendan Corish
Preceded by Gerard Sweetman	Minister for Finance; 1957–1965	Succeeded by Jack Lynch

Dáil	Election	Deputy (Party)	Deputy (Party)	Deputy (Party)	Deputy (Party)	Deputy (Party)
2nd	1921	Richard Corish (SF)	James Ryan (SF)	Séamus Doyle (SF)	Seán Etchingham (SF)	4 seats 1921–1923
3rd	1922	Richard Corish (Lab)	Daniel O'Callaghan (Lab)	Séamus Doyle (AT-SF)	Michael Doyle (FP)	4 seats 1921–1923
4th	1923	Richard Corish (Lab)	James Ryan (Rep)	Robert Lambert (Rep)	Michael Doyle (FP)	Osmond Esmonde (CnaG)
5th	1927 (Jun)	Richard Corish (Lab)	James Ryan (FF)	James Shannon (Lab)	Michael Doyle (FP)	John Keating (NL)
6th	1927 (Sep)	Richard Corish (Lab)	James Ryan (FF)	Denis Allen (FF)	Michael Jordan (FP)	Osmond Esmonde (CnaG)
7th	1932	Richard Corish (Lab)	James Ryan (FF)	Denis Allen (FF)	John Keating (CnaG)	Osmond Esmonde (CnaG)
8th	1933	Richard Corish (Lab)	James Ryan (FF)	Patrick Kehoe (FF)	John Keating (CnaG)	Osmond Esmonde (CnaG)
8th	1936 by-election	Richard Corish (Lab)	James Ryan (FF)	Patrick Kehoe (FF)	John Keating (CnaG)	Denis Allen (FF)
9th	1937	Richard Corish (Lab)	James Ryan (FF)	John Keating (FG)	John Esmonde (FG)	Denis Allen (FF)
10th	1938	Richard Corish (Lab)	James Ryan (FF)	John Keating (FG)	John Esmonde (FG)	Denis Allen (FF)
11th	1943	Richard Corish (Lab)	James Ryan (FF)	John O'Leary (Lab)	John Esmonde (FG)	Denis Allen (FF)
12th	1944	Richard Corish (Lab)	James Ryan (FF)	John O'Leary (NLP)	John Keating (FG)	Denis Allen (FF)
12th	1945 by-election	Brendan Corish (Lab)	James Ryan (FF)	John O'Leary (NLP)	John Keating (FG)	Denis Allen (FF)
13th	1948	Brendan Corish (Lab)	James Ryan (FF)	John O'Leary (NLP)	John Esmonde (FG)	Denis Allen (FF)
14th	1951	Brendan Corish (Lab)	James Ryan (FF)	John O'Leary (Lab)	Anthony Esmonde (FG)	Denis Allen (FF)
15th	1954	Brendan Corish (Lab)	James Ryan (FF)	John O'Leary (Lab)	Anthony Esmonde (FG)	Denis Allen (FF)
16th	1957	Brendan Corish (Lab)	James Ryan (FF)	Seán Browne (FF)	Anthony Esmonde (FG)	Denis Allen (FF)
17th	1961	Brendan Corish (Lab)	James Ryan (FF)	Lorcan Allen (FF)	Anthony Esmonde (FG)	4 seats 1961–1981
18th	1965	Brendan Corish (Lab)	James Kennedy (FF)	Lorcan Allen (FF)	Anthony Esmonde (FG)	4 seats 1961–1981
19th	1969	Brendan Corish (Lab)	Seán Browne (FF)	Lorcan Allen (FF)	Anthony Esmonde (FG)	4 seats 1961–1981
20th	1973	Brendan Corish (Lab)	Seán Browne (FF)	Lorcan Allen (FF)	John Esmonde (FG)	4 seats 1961–1981
21st	1977	Brendan Corish (Lab)	Seán Browne (FF)	Lorcan Allen (FF)	Michael D'Arcy (FG)	4 seats 1961–1981
22nd	1981	Brendan Corish (Lab)	Ivan Yates (FG)	Lorcan Allen (FF)	Michael D'Arcy (FG)	Hugh Byrne (FF)
23rd	1982 (Feb)	Seán Browne (FF)	Ivan Yates (FG)	Lorcan Allen (FF)	Michael D'Arcy (FG)	Hugh Byrne (FF)
24th	1982 (Nov)	Avril Doyle (FG)	Ivan Yates (FG)	John Browne (FF)	Michael D'Arcy (FG)	Hugh Byrne (FF)
25th	1987	Avril Doyle (FG)	Ivan Yates (FG)	John Browne (FF)	Brendan Howlin (Lab)	Hugh Byrne (FF)
26th	1989	Michael D'Arcy (FG)	Ivan Yates (FG)	John Browne (FF)	Brendan Howlin (Lab)	Séamus Cullimore (FF)
27th	1992	Avril Doyle (FG)	Ivan Yates (FG)	John Browne (FF)	Brendan Howlin (Lab)	Hugh Byrne (FF)
28th	1997	Michael D'Arcy (FG)	Ivan Yates (FG)	John Browne (FF)	Brendan Howlin (Lab)	Hugh Byrne (FF)
29th	2002	Paul Kehoe (FG)	Liam Twomey (Ind.)	John Browne (FF)	Brendan Howlin (Lab)	Tony Dempsey (FF)
30th	2007	Paul Kehoe (FG)	Michael W. D'Arcy (FG)	John Browne (FF)	Brendan Howlin (Lab)	Seán Connick (FF)
31st	2011	Paul Kehoe (FG)	Liam Twomey (FG)	John Browne (FF)	Brendan Howlin (Lab)	Mick Wallace (Ind.)
32nd	2016	Paul Kehoe (FG)	Michael W. D'Arcy (FG)	James Browne (FF)	Brendan Howlin (Lab)	Mick Wallace (I4C)
32nd	2019 by-election	Paul Kehoe (FG)	Michael W. D'Arcy (FG)	James Browne (FF)	Brendan Howlin (Lab)	Malcolm Byrne (FF)
33rd	2020	Paul Kehoe (FG)	Verona Murphy (Ind.)	James Browne (FF)	Brendan Howlin (Lab)	Johnny Mythen (SF)
34th	2024	4 seats since 2024	Verona Murphy (Ind.)	James Browne (FF)	George Lawlor (Lab)	Johnny Mythen (SF)
