= Eoin Ryan Snr =

Irish politician (1920–2001)

Senator
- In office 14 December 1961 – 25 April 1987
- Constituency: Industrial and Commercial Panel
- In office 22 May 1957 – 14 December 1961
- Constituency: Labour Panel

Personal details
- Born: 12 June 1920 Dublin, Ireland
- Died: 14 December 2001 (aged 81) Dublin, Ireland
- Party: Fianna Fáil
- Spouse: Joan Dowd (m. 1949)
- Children: 4, including Eoin Jnr
- Parents: James Ryan (father); Máirín Cregan (mother)
- Education: University College Dublin; King's Inns

Military service
- Allegiance: Ireland
- Branch/service: Defence Forces
- Years of service: 1940–1943
- Rank: Captain

Eoin David Ryan (12 June 1920 – 14 December 2001) was an Irish Fianna Fáil politician, and a Senator for thirty years.

Ryan was born in Dublin. When Ryan was born, his father and mother were actively engaged in the War of Independence. His mother Máirín Cregan was arrested when he was a baby in February 1921 and held in prison for a short time at the same time as his father. She later made her name as a writer. His father, James Ryan, was a founder member of Fianna Fáil and a member of successive governments. Eoin Ryan was educated at Presentation College, Bray, and later at Mount St. Joseph Abbey, Roscrea. He joined the Defence Forces during the emergency years of World War II and rose to the rank of captain between 1940 and 1943. He later returned to his studies at University College Dublin, achieving a Bachelor of Arts in economics and a diploma in public administration. He went on to study at King's Inns and was called to the bar in 1945.

Throughout this time, Ryan had an intense interest in politics although, unlike his father, who was a Minister for most of his 30 years in the Dáil, the young Ryan was reluctant to enter full-time politics. He preferred putting his views forward on the governing bodies of the party, where he served for many years on the national executive and as vice president of Fianna Fáil. Ryan was first elected to Seanad Éireann in 1957, winning a seat on the Labour Panel, although he switched to the Industrial and Commercial Panel in 1961. For four of his years in the upper house, 1965 to 1969, his father was also a Senator serving after his retirement from the Dáil. He was Leader of the Seanad from 1977 to 1981 and leader of the Fianna Fáil group from 1973 to 1977.

He married Joan Dowd in 1949; and they had four children. One son, also called Eoin Ryan, was also a member of Seanad Éireann, Dáil Éireann, and was a Member of the European Parliament for Dublin.

Eoin Ryan Snr died on 14 December 2001.
