= Free Stater (Ireland) =

Free Stater, or pro-Treatyite, were terms, often used by opponents, to describe those in Ireland who supported the Anglo-Irish Treaty of 1921 that led to the creation of the Irish Free State in 1922. The pro-Treaty side included members of the Old IRA who had fought the British during the recent Irish War of Independence. Led by Michael Collins and Richard Mulcahy, it soon became the nucleus of the new (regular) Irish National Army that overcame their anti-Treaty IRA opponents during the often-bitter Irish Civil War of 1922–1923.

The term is sometimes heard anachronistically in Northern Ireland for anyone from the Republic of Ireland, occasionally as a pejorative term when used to refer to partitionists.

== See also ==
- The Sniper
