= Josephine Ryan =

Irish nationalist (1884–1977)

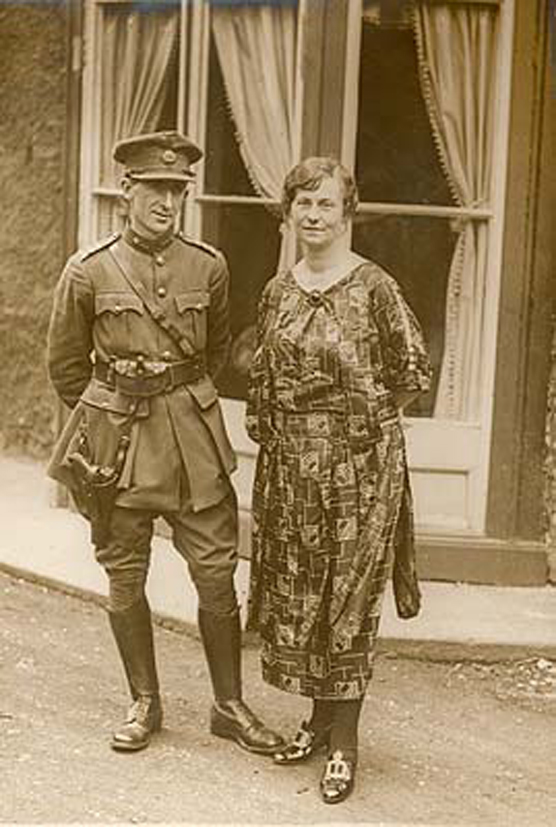
- Ryan and husband Richard Mulcahy
- Born: Mary Josephine Ryan; 29 December 1884; Tomcoole, Wexford, Ireland
- Died: 11 April 1977 (aged 92); Dublin, Ireland
- Other name: Josephine Mulcahy
- Spouse: Richard Mulcahy
- Children: 6, including Neillí
- Relatives: James Ryan (brother); Phyllis Ryan (sister); Mary Kate Ryan (sister); Agnes McCullough (sister); Nell Ryan (sister)

Mary Josephine Ryan (29 December 1884 – 16 April 1977) was an Irish Nationalist. A member of Cumann na mBan and the honorary secretary of the executive committee, she took part in the 1916 Easter Rising and the War of Independence.

== Background ==
Born Mary Josephine Ryan in Tomcoole, near Taghmon in County Wexford to John Ryan and Eliza Sutton, she was better known as Min to her friends. She was educated in both the Loreto Abbey in Gorey and Dublin and attended boarding school in Thurles called The Ursuline. After leaving secondary-level education, she attended the Royal University of Ireland, taking English, German and French. She graduated in 1908 from the National University after she had spent some time in both France and Germany.

Ryan was a teacher in Germany for two years and taught English, she then taught in London for a further four years. After they graduated, each of Ryan's sisters taught English in Germany or France. As they were all in different countries, the sisters used a different method of communication. They sent around a large notebook, on which each sister contributed to the notebook by writing a letter. The notebook ended up being a great method of communication between the Ryan sisters and travelled around Europe.

While Ryan was in London, she stayed in contact with the Irish Nationalist diaspora. Following the end of World War I, Ryan returned to Ireland.

== Personal life ==
Before she married, she lived with her sister for a few years in Ranelagh. All twelve children from the Ryan family had secondary education, and eleven of them went on to the old Catholic University or to University College Dublin. Ryan was one of the last students to attend the institution. Her family was very much a nationalist house, with several of her 11 siblings involved in the Easter Rising and subsequent wars. Her brother James went on to become a politician, her sister Nell was the first woman elected to Wexford County Council, while two other sisters, Mary Kate and Phyllis, were married (at different times) to Seán T. O'Kelly, second President of Ireland.

She met Seán Mac Diarmada, who later became one of the leaders of the Easter Rising, while she was in college. After graduation, she moved to London to attend the London University and gain her teacher certification. In 1914, she founded the local Cumann na mBan branch there. In 1915, she returned to Dublin to teach German at the Rathmines Technical School. Mac Diarmada asked her to go to Germany because of her facility with the language, but on her sisters' advice, she didn't go. Joseph Plunkett was sent instead.

Ryan was engaged to Seán Mac Diarmada, he described her as the woman he would have married had he lived. She was one of the last people to visit him before he was executed by the British after the Rising.

== 1916 involvement ==
Early in the morning before Seán Mac Diarmada was executed, she outlined her visit in an article with her sister Phyllis to him. Ryan was present at the house where some of the leaders of the planned insurrection met, and it was decided, by them, to call off the event for Easter 1916. Ryan was sent to Wexford by Eoin MacNeill with the message that there would be no rising. She delivered the message but hoping that in fact the rising would still take place, she told the men in Wexford her opinion and returned to Dublin to see what would happen. Despite being involved with one of the leaders of the Rising, Ryan was unaware of the plans, only that she could tell something was to happen and that her fiancée was extremely busy and stressed.

During the Rising itself, Ryan transported messages to the wives of three captured British officers and to other members of the rebellion. She witnessed The O'Rahilly giving orders to treat the captives in the GPO with dignity and fairness. The prisoners confirmed that later by telling how he had ensured their good treatment and safety.

After the surrender, Ryan was not arrested as she was not present in any of the locations. She had returned home when a sniper had shot a dog in front of her while she was headed back to the GPO and passing the College of Surgeons. She and Louise Gavan Duffy went to Jacob's Factory on the Sunday morning to witness the final surrender of the men there. Again, none of the women in that location were arrested. The British officer on the site was not interested in the women.

A conversation was recorded on RTE for the 50th anniversary of the Rising between Ryan and Mulcahy. The conversation entails Ryan's encounters and experiences in the week of the Rising, followed by a discussion which gave a good understanding of the week.

== Later life ==
After the Easter Rising, Ryan went to America to give John Devoy (the leader of the American based Irish republican organization Clan na Gael) a first-hand account of the Rising. She married General Richard Mulcahy on 2 June 1919 in Dublin. They had six children: Padraic, Seán, Risteárd, Elizabeth, Neillí, and Maura. At the beginning of their marriage, they lived in a flat, which was regularly raided by the British military; Ryan had her first child there.

During the Irish War of Independence, Mulcahy spends a significant amount of time on the run, and the family lived in the old buildings used by Pearce for St Enda's School. Eventually, his mother asked them to leave since the frequent Black and Tan raids on them caused damage to the house. In September 1920, Ryan went to stay with her sister Agnes in Belfast for some months.

After Michael Collins's death, they moved to Lissenfield House, next to Portobello barracks because Collins had held meetings in several of their previous addresses, and it was not considered safe to remain there. Mulcahy then took over leadership of the army. Mulcahy later became commander-in-chief of the Irish Army and leader of Fine Gael from 1944 to 1948.

Many times throughout Ryan's life, she was uprooted by the raids carried out by the Black and Tans. Because her husband was constantly fleeing and could visit her only in secret, it was a very difficult time in her life. In September 1920, Ryan moved to Belfast for a few months to live with her sister.

Ryan was acknowledged in the Wounded Soldiers’ Comforts Fund after the Civil War. She worked alongside her sister Phyllis for the Army Benevolent Fund, even though they had been on opposite sides during the war. Ryan was a treasurer of the ladies' committee of the 43rd Battalion, which was chaired by Kathleen Lemass. The committee knitted pullovers and socks for the local Defence Force. She was said to be a possible candidate for the Seanad in 1925. She did some fundraising for the Central Catholic Library by organising bridge tournaments. She also helped with fundraising for the building of a new Catholic Church in Cabra.

She was the president of the Loreto Past Pupils Union. She was also a part of the fundraising committee for the Meath Hospital. Ryan and her family remained in residence in Portobello until 1966, where they brought up six of their children, three sons and three daughters. With her managerial skills, she maintained a well-operated household with the help of servants. On the few acres that were attached to the house, they kept fowl and dairy cattle and grew fruits and vegetables.

Mulcahy died at the age of 85 in 1971. After his death, Ryan lived with another woman from Wexford, Maggie, in the house of her son Seán.

Eventually, Ryan was admitted to Our Lady's Hospice in Harold's Cross, Dublin, with dementia. Ryan died there a few days later on 11 April 1977 at the age of 92. Mr and Mrs Mulcahy were remembered by their children as a loving couple, but that may not have been visible to the public eye.

In June 2020, a newly constructed public park in her home county of Wexford was named in her honour. The park includes a playground, picnic area, dog park, memorial garden, walking track, water features, multi-use events area, play spaces, wildflower meadows and art/sculpture displays. There are also benches dedicated to each of the Ryan siblings.

== Sources ==
- "Min and Mary-Kate Ryan". County Wexford 1916 Commemorative website.
- Feeney, Brian (2 May 2014). Seán MacDiarmada: 16 Lives. O'Brien Press. ISBN 978-1-84717-653-0.
- Siggins, Gerard (26 November 2015). "Min Ryan, the woman who 'would have been my wife'". Irish Independent.
- Foy, Michael T.; Barton, Brian (21 October 2011). The Easter Rising. History Press. ISBN 978-0-7524-7272-0.
- O’Shea, Maria, ed. (2010). "Seán T. Ó Ceallaigh and The Ryans of Tomcoole" (PDF). National Library of Ireland.
- "Statement by Witness:Mrs Richard Mulcahy" (PDF).
