= Denis McCullough =

Irish nationalist political activist (1883–1968)

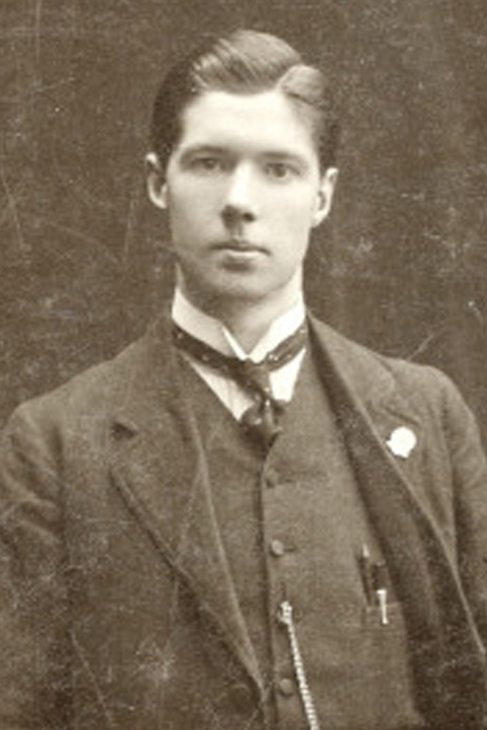
- McCullough, c. 1900s

President of the Irish Republican Brotherhood
- In office c. 1915 – c. 1916
- Preceded by: Seamus Deakin
- Succeeded by: Thomas Ashe

Teachta Dála
- In office November 1924 – June 1927
- Constituency: Donegal

Personal details
- Born: 24 January 1883 Belfast, Ireland
- Died: 11 September 1968 (aged 85) Dublin, Ireland
- Party: Sinn Féin; Cumann na nGaedheal
- Spouse: Agnes Ryan (m. 1916)
- Children: 6

Military service
- Allegiance: Irish Republican Brotherhood; Irish Volunteers; Irish Republican Army
- Battles/wars: Irish War of Independence; Irish Civil War

Denis McCullough (24 January 1883 – 11 September 1968) was a prominent Irish nationalist political activist in the early 20th century, who served as President of the Irish Republican Brotherhood (IRB) from 1915 to 1916.

== Early career – IRB activist ==
McCullough was born at 1 Barrack Street, Belfast, on 24 January 1883, to Daniel McCullough, a publican, and Margaret Magee.

McCullough was a separatist nationalist from an early age. Both his father and grandfather were in the Irish Republican Brotherhood (IRB), as was his brother. When he was 17, his father had him inducted into the IRB at the side door of a pub by a man who seemed to view the ritual as an unpleasant distraction to a night of drinking. The event disillusioned McCullough with the IRB, and he took it upon himself to revitalise the organisation, with assistance from, among others, Bulmer Hobson and Seán Mac Diarmada. The trio founded the Dungannon Clubs as a non-sectarian, republican, separatist organisation (it was later absorbed into Sinn Féin), for recruitment. They worked to remove "armchair republicans" from positions of power. Their cause prospered with the return of veteran Fenian Tom Clarke to Ireland in 1907.

== President of IRB and Easter Rising ==
McCullough was elected to fill the vacant seat of the President of the IRB late in 1915, a position he held during the 1916 Easter Rising, though he took no active role in the rising itself. He was not a member of the Military Committee that was responsible for its planning. It is likely that the other members of the three-man IRB executive, Clarke and MacDermott (the treasurer and secretary) supported his nomination as president because, as he was isolated in Belfast, he would be in no position to interfere with their plans. Nevertheless, during Holy Week he got word of what was afoot and travelled to Dublin to question Clarke and MacDermott, who avoided him as long as they could. Eventually, they informed him of their plans, which he came to support. Although McCullough was an officer of the Irish Volunteers, in charge of 200 men in Belfast, it was decided that Belfast would not take part in the rising, given that the dominance of the Ulster Volunteers in the northeast could lead to sectarian civil war.

McCullough stated in his application for an Irish military pension in 1937 that, "I brought out my men in Belfast and mobilised them at Coalisland to cooperate with the Tyrone Volunteers in accordance with orders from Pearse and Connolly received by me. Their orders were to bring all available men and arms across Ulster to Connaught to join Mellows there. They were insistent, especially James Connolly, that we were to 'fire no shot in Ulster'. I thought these orders were mad ones but determined to carry out [the] orders if possible."

McCullough led Volunteers in his area to Dungannon, County Tyrone, from where they would link up with Liam Mellows in Connacht. Although the Volunteer's Chief of Staff Eoin MacNeill issued a countermanding order, cancelling orders for the rising, McCullough took 150 Volunteers and Cumman na mBan by train from Belfast to Dungannon, where he found the local volunteers under Patrick McCartan did not want to leave their home area. McCullough, therefore, decided to return to Belfast. During the abortive Rising, he accidentally shot himself in the hand. He was arrested that week and taken to Richmond Barracks, Dublin. He spent several months interned at Frongoch internment camp and was imprisoned in Reading Gaol.

On his release, he married Agnes Ryan, a sister of politician James Ryan and of Josephine Ryan and Phyllis Ryan, and sister-in-law to Seán T. O'Kelly and Richard Mulcahy.

It has been argued that as president of the Irish Republican Brotherhood at the time of the Easter Rising, the title President of the Irish Republic was by rights his, and not Patrick Pearse's. However, as he had no real role in the planning of the insurrection and was not in the vicinity of Dublin, where it was clear the leadership would need to be, it is understandable that Pearse was given the title instead. McCullough's decision not to fight in the Easter Rising cost him his pre-eminent position among Belfast republicans. One, Sean Cusack, later said that he told McCullough, "we all felt he had, to some extent, let us down".

== War of Independence and Treaty ==
Plaque in Divis Street, Belfast

McCullough felt he was sidelined during the Rising and left the IRB. He was an ordinary volunteer in the Irish War of Independence (1919–1921), during which he was arrested and imprisoned by the British several times and held for long periods. He was imprisoned from May 1918 to March 1919 and again from September 1920 to January 1921 and finally from late January to December 1921. McCullough contested Tyrone South for Sinn Féin at the 1918 general election, losing to the Unionist candidate William Coote. He also unsuccessfully contested the 1921 election to the new Northern Ireland Parliament for Sinn Féin in the 4-seat Belfast West constituency. In early 1922, he was sent by Michael Collins to America to liaise between the IRB and its American sister organisation Clan na Gael.

In 1922, he supported the Anglo-Irish Treaty, despite its acceptance of the partition of Ireland, as a way of keeping the republican movement united and focused on the north. He later said of the split in the southern movement, "while they were making up their minds about the Treaty, their people in the north were being killed day by day. They could not stand up the terror in Ulster unless they had a united organisation behind them". He was reportedly unaware that Michael Collins was continuing to covertly arm the IRA in Ulster until August 1922, partly to protect nationalists there and partly to try to bring down the Northern Irish state. After the Treaty, he was sent by George Gavan Duffy to the United States to make contact with Irish republican organisations there. He later settled in Dublin in the new Irish Free State.

== Business and later political career ==
McCullough's political activity went alongside maintaining and developing an instrument-making and retail music business in Belfast's Howard Street, generated from his original trade as a piano tuner. Francis J. Bigger, a solicitor, antiquarian, nationalist, and cultural revivalist, and friend of Roger Casement, encouraged its growth with orders for bagpipes for his boy bands. In time, after he moved to Dublin, this became McCullough Pigott of Suffolk Street and marked the beginning of a highly successful and influential Free State business career. He distinguished himself in forming the New Ireland Assurance Company. A director of Clondalkin Paper Mills, he also had a role in the Irish Army School of Music, and the Gate Theatre. While in the U.S. as Special Commissioner for the Free State (leaving his wife in charge of the music business), McCullough's new premises in Dawson Street were destroyed by an Anti-Treaty IRA land mine as a reprisal during the Irish Civil War.

On 20 November 1924, McCullough was elected to the 4th Dáil for Cumann na nGaedheal at the 1924 Donegal by-election which following the resignation of Peter Ward. He did not contest the subsequent general election, held in June 1927.

Political offices
Preceded by Seamus Deakin	President of the Irish Republican Brotherhood; 1915–1916	Succeeded by Thomas Ashe

Dáil	Election	Deputy (Party)	Deputy (Party)	Deputy (Party)	Deputy (Party)	Deputy (Party)	Deputy (Party)	Deputy (Party)	Deputy (Party)
2nd	1921	Joseph O'Doherty (SF)	Samuel O'Flaherty (SF)	Patrick McGoldrick (SF)	Joseph McGinley (SF)	Joseph Sweeney (SF)	Peter Ward (SF)	6 seats 1921–1923	
3rd	1922	Joseph O'Doherty (AT-SF)	Samuel O'Flaherty (AT-SF)	Patrick McGoldrick (PT-SF)	Joseph McGinley (PT-SF)	Joseph Sweeney (PT-SF)	Peter Ward (PT-SF)	6 seats 1921–1923	
4th	1923	Joseph O'Doherty (Rep)	Peadar O'Donnell (Rep)	Patrick McGoldrick (CnaG)	Eugene Doherty (CnaG)	Patrick McFadden (CnaG)	Peter Ward (CnaG)	James Myles (Ind.)	John White (FP)
4th	1924 by-election	Joseph O'Doherty (Rep)	Peadar O'Donnell (Rep)	Patrick McGoldrick (CnaG)	Eugene Doherty (CnaG)	Patrick McFadden (CnaG)	Denis McCullough (CnaG)	James Myles (Ind.)	John White (FP)
5th	1927 (Jun)	Frank Carney (FF)	Neal Blaney (FF)	Daniel McMenamin (NL)	Eugene Doherty (CnaG)	Michael Óg McFadden (CnaG)	Hugh Law (CnaG)	James Myles (Ind.)	John White (FP)
6th	1927 (Sep)	Frank Carney (FF)	Neal Blaney (FF)	Archie Cassidy (Lab)	Eugene Doherty (CnaG)	Michael Óg McFadden (CnaG)	Hugh Law (CnaG)	James Myles (Ind.)	John White (FP)
7th	1932	Frank Carney (FF)	Neal Blaney (FF)	Brian Brady (FF)	Eugene Doherty (CnaG)	Daniel McMenamin (CnaG)	James Dillon (Ind.)	James Myles (Ind.)	John White (CnaG)
8th	1933	Joseph O'Doherty (FF)	Neal Blaney (FF)	Brian Brady (FF)	Hugh Doherty (FF)	Daniel McMenamin (CnaG)	James Dillon (NCP)	James Myles (Ind.)	Michael Óg McFadden (CnaG)
9th	1937	Constituency abolished. See Donegal East and Donegal West							

Dáil	Election	Deputy (Party)	Deputy (Party)	Deputy (Party)	Deputy (Party)	Deputy (Party)
21st	1977	Hugh Conaghan (FF)	Joseph Brennan (FF)	Neil Blaney (IFF)	James White (FG)	Paddy Harte (FG)
21st	1980 by-election	Hugh Conaghan (FF)	Clement Coughlan (FF)	Neil Blaney (IFF)	James White (FG)	Paddy Harte (FG)
22nd	1981	Constituency abolished. See Donegal North-East and Donegal South-West				

Dáil	Election	Deputy (Party)	Deputy (Party)	Deputy (Party)	Deputy (Party)	Deputy (Party)
32nd	2016	Pearse Doherty (SF)	Pat "the Cope" Gallagher (FF)	Thomas Pringle (Ind.)	Charlie McConalogue (FF)	Joe McHugh (FG)
33rd	2020	Pearse Doherty (SF)	Pádraig Mac Lochlainn (SF)	Thomas Pringle (Ind.)	Charlie McConalogue (FF)	Joe McHugh (FG)
34th	2024	Pearse Doherty (SF)	Pádraig Mac Lochlainn (SF)	Charles Ward (100%R)	Charlie McConalogue (FF)	Pat "the Cope" Gallagher (FF)
