= Phyllis Ryan =

Irish chemist & nationalist (1895–1983)

- Ryan in 1964
- Born: Philomena Frances Ryan; 28 February 1895; Taghmon, County Wexford, Ireland
- Died: 19 November 1983 (aged 88); Dublin, Ireland
- Resting place: Glasnevin Cemetery, Dublin, Ireland
- Education: University College Dublin; National University of Ireland
- Spouse: Seán T. O'Kelly (m. 1936; died 1966)
- Relatives: James Ryan (brother); Josephine Ryan (sister); Mary Kate Ryan (sister); Agnes McCullough (sister); Nell Ryan (sister)

Philomena Frances Ryan (28 February 1895 – 19 November 1983) was an Irish chemist and nationalist and the second wife of President of Ireland, Seán T. O'Kelly.

== Early life and family ==
Philomena Frances Ryan was born on 28 February 1895 to John Ryan and Elizabeth (née Sutton), farmers in Tomcoole, near Taghmon, County Wexford. Ryan was the youngest of six sisters and five brothers. They were a nationalist family who "played an important role in revolutionary politics and helped shape the new Free State." Their home was used as a headquarters in the War of Independence. Her brother, James Ryan was an Irish Volunteer who became a senior Fianna Fáil Minister. Ryan and her sisters were involved in Cumann na mBan, two of whom were arrested and imprisoned after the Easter Rising. Three of her sisters went on to marry Seán T. O'Kelly, Richard Mulcahy, and Denis McCullough respectively.

Ryan was educated in the small nearby national school at Caroreigh and in the Loreto Abbey in Gorey. For third level she went to University College Dublin, where she graduated with a B.Sc. in chemistry in 1916, followed by her master's degree the following year. She was the only woman in her year and only the fifth female scientist to have graduated from the National University of Ireland.

== Nationalism ==
During her time in college, the Easter rising took place. Ryan reported for duty at the General Post Office, Dublin with her sisters, where they acted as messengers. The Ryan sisters also attempted to get the British army to stop firing on Red Cross locations. In the lead up to the events she and her sisters had acted as cover for the men meeting up, accompanying them to make it look like they were out with their girlfriends.

Between 1919 and 1921, during the War of Independence she divided her time between her work as a chemist and her political and military activities. Ryan was a member of, and at one point a captain in, Cumann na mBan. She managed to escape arrest and worked with the organisations supporting those who did get arrested.

When the Irish Civil War began, Ryan agreed with the anti-Treaty side. She wrote to her sister Min severing ties with herself and her husband Richard Mulcahy, a general in the Free State army, for the duration.

== Career ==
Ryan worked with Professor Hugh Ryan and published papers. Some of their research was funded by Nobels Ltd. Ryan went to London to train as a public analyst. When she came back to Dublin she worked in the college laboratory. In 1925, she set up a laboratory in Dawson Street, Dublin where she worked as a public analyst. She chose to employ female graduates. Eventually Ryan was the public analyst for 12 county councils. For many years she was the only female public analyst in Ireland.

Ryan was a founder member of the Irish Chemical Association (1922–36). She was on the committee of the Irish Chemical Association (1936–7), then vice-president (1938–40) and president (1940–41). In 1934, Ryan became a member of the first industrial research council.

== Later life ==
In September 1936, Ryan married Seán T. O'Kelly. He was the widower of her sister Mary Kate (Kit) who had died in 1934 at the age of 55. The couple received a papal dispensation in order to marry. They had no children. Her husband became President of Ireland in 1945, at which point Ryan gave up her career. Her hobbies included flower arranging and bridge. In June 1946, Ryan organised a reunion event at Áras an Uachtaráin for members of Cumann na mBan,

Her husband served two terms as President of Ireland before retiring in 1959, at which point the couple moved to Roundwood, County Wicklow. O'Kelly died in 1966. Ryan died on 19 November 1983 aged 88 in Our Lady's Hospice at Harold's Cross, Dublin. They are both buried in Glasnevin Cemetery.
