= Seamus Deakin =

Irish republican (1874–1952

- Born: James Aubrey Deakin; 19 June 1874; Mount Auburn, Drumcondra, Dublin
- Died: 10 December 1952 (aged 78); Drumcollogher, County Limerick, Ireland
- Occupation: Pharmacist
- Known for: Presidency of the Irish Republican Brotherhood (IRB)

James Aubrey "Seamus" Deakin (19 June 1874 – 10 December 1952) was an Irish republican who was president of the Irish Republican Brotherhood (IRB) from 1913 to 1914.

== Biography ==
He was born James Aubtey Deakin at Mount Auburn, Richmond Road, Drumcondra, Dublin, the son of James Deakin, a travelling salesman, and Mary Anne Tate. His family was Church of Ireland.

By 1901, he was living at 27 Millmount Avenue, Drumcondra, with his wife, Catherine, a Scottish-born Presbyterian. Ten years later, the couple were living at 37 Thomond Terrace, Inn's Quay, Dublin, with their three children.

Deakin worked as a chemist in Hoyt's pharmacy in O'Connell Street and later owned his own shop in Phibsborough. Deakin became involved in the Irish nationalist movement during the early 1900s, along with other Protestant nationalists such as George Irvine, Ernest Blythe and Seán O'Casey, and within a short time became a high-ranking member in the Drumcondra branch of the Irish Republican Brotherhood. In 1913, he succeeded John Mulholland as president of the IRB before acceding to Denis McCullough the following year. Deakin resigned from the Supreme Council and from the IRB about August 1914.

He retired as a pharmacist in 1946, moving to Drumcollogher, County Limerick, where his daughter ran a pharmacy. He died of a coronary thrombosis on 10 December 1952 in Drumcollogher, and was buried in the local cemetery.

Political offices
Preceded by John Mulholland	President of the Irish Republican Brotherhood; 1913-1914	Succeeded by Denis McCullough
