= John Mulholland (Irish republican) =

Irish republican

John Mulholland was president of the Irish Republican Brotherhood from 1910 to 1912. He was also the leader of the IRB in Scotland.

Political offices
Preceded by Neal O'Boyle	President of the Irish Republican Brotherhood; 1910-1912	Succeeded by Seamus Deakin
