= Seán Mac Diarmada =

Irish republican and revolutionary (1883–1916)

Seán Mac Diarmada Seán MacDermott
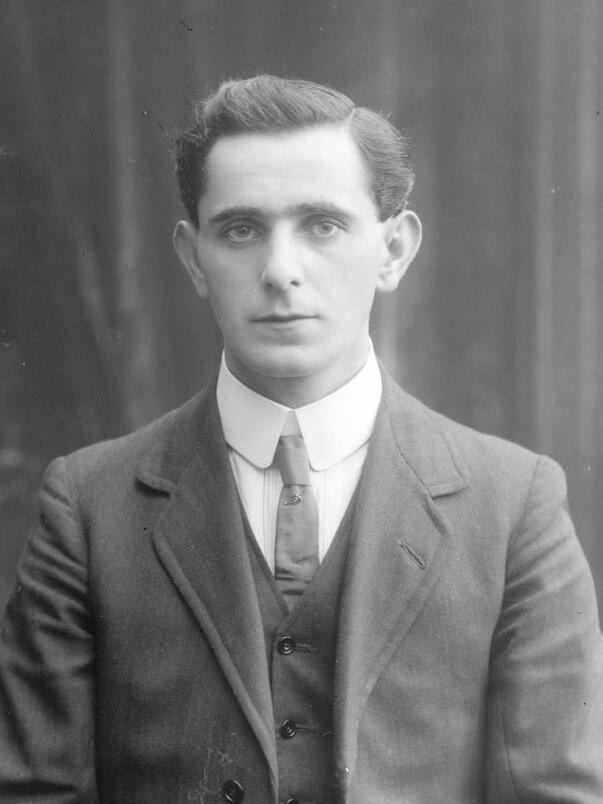
- Born: 27 January 1883; Kiltyclogher, County Leitrim, Ireland
- Died: 12 May 1916 (aged 33); Kilmainham Gaol, Dublin, Ireland
- Cause of death: Execution by firing squad
- Military career
- Allegiance: Irish Republic
- Branch: Irish Volunteers
- Service years: 1913–1916
- Conflicts: Easter Rising
- Memorials: Sligo Mac Diarmada railway station
- Other work: Educator, principal, barrister, republican activist, poet

Seán Mac Diarmada (27 January 1883 – 12 May 1916), also known as Seán MacDermott, was an Irish republican political activist and revolutionary leader. He was one of the seven leaders of the Easter Rising of 1916, which he helped to organise as a member of the Military Committee of the Irish Republican Brotherhood (IRB) and was the second signatory of the Proclamation of the Irish Republic. He was executed for his part in the Rising at age 33.

Brought up in County Leitrim (Kiltyclogher, Glenfarne), he was a member of many associations which promoted the cause of the Irish language, Gaelic revival and Irish nationalism in general, including the Gaelic League and (early in his career) the Irish Catholic fraternity the Ancient Order of Hibernians. He was the national organiser for Sinn Féin, and later manager of the newspaper Irish Freedom, started in 1910 by Bulmer Hobson and others.

== Early life ==
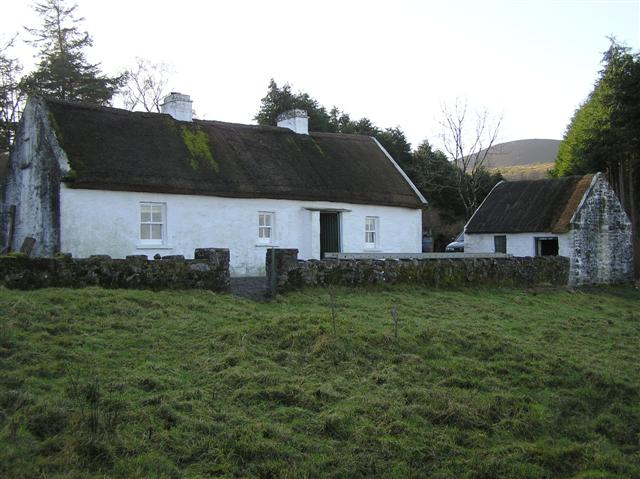
Seán Mac Diarmada's birthplace near Kiltyclogher

Mac Diarmada was born John MacDermott, in County Leitrim, an area where the landscape was marked by reminders of poverty and oppression. His father Donald McDermott was a member of the IRB and a friend of John Daly.

Surrounding Mac Diarmada in rural Leitrim, there were signs of Irish history throughout the area. There was an ancient sweat-house, Mass rocks from the penal times and the persecutions of the 17th and 18th centuries, and deserted abodes as an aftermath of the hunger of the 1840s.

He was educated at Corradoona national school. In 1908 he moved to Dublin, by which time he already had a long involvement in several Irish nationalist and cultural organisations, including Sinn Féin, the Irish Republican Brotherhood (IRB), the Ancient Order of Hibernians and the Gaelic League. He was soon promoted to the Supreme Council of the IRB and eventually elected secretary. He originally refused to join the IRB as it was condemned by the Catholic church but Bulmer Hobson convinced him otherwise.

In 1910 he became manager of the radical newspaper Irish Freedom, which he founded along with Bulmer Hobson and Denis McCullough. He also became a national organiser for the IRB and was taken under the wing of veteran Fenian Tom Clarke. Indeed, over the year the two became nearly inseparable. Shortly thereafter Mac Diarmada contracted polio and needed a cane to walk.

MacDiarmada along with Clarke supported the workers during the 1913 Dublin Lockout.

In November 1913 Mac Diarmada was one of the original members of the Irish Volunteers, and continued to work to bring that organisation under IRB control. In May 1915 Mac Diarmada was arrested in Tuam, County Galway, under the Defence of the Realm Act 1914 for giving a speech against enlisting into the British Army during the First World War.

== Easter Rising ==
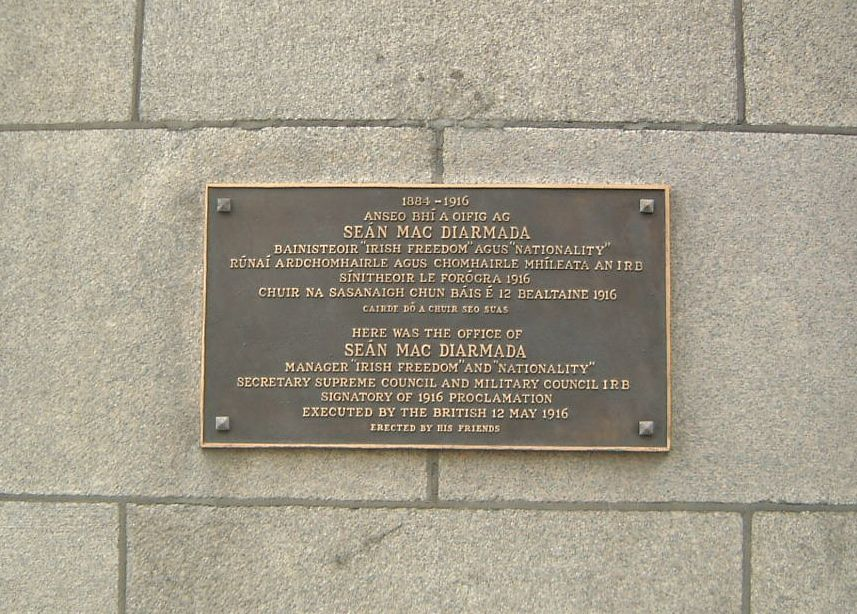
Plaque outside offices in Dublin once used by Seán MacDiarmada

Following his release in September 1915, he joined the secret Military Committee of the IRB, which was responsible for planning the rising. Indeed, Mac Diarmada and Clarke were the people most responsible for it. In 1914 he said "the Irish patriotic spirit will die forever unless a blood sacrifice is made in the next few years".

Due to his disability, Mac Diarmada took little part in the fighting of Easter week, but was stationed at the headquarters in the General Post Office (GPO), as one of the Provisional Republican Government. Following the surrender, he nearly escaped execution by blending in with the large body of prisoners. He was eventually recognised by Daniel Hoey of G Division. Following a court-martial on 9 May, Mac Diarmada was executed by firing squad in Kilmainham Gaol on 12 May at the age of 33.

In September 1919 Hoey was shot dead by Michael Collins's Squad. Likewise, the British Officer Lee-Wilson, who ordered Mac Diarmada be shot, rather than imprisoned, was also killed in Gorey, County Wexford on Collins's order during the Irish War of Independence.

Mac Diarmada had been in regular correspondence with Nell Ryan. In his final letter he wrote: "Miss Ryan, she who in all probability, had I lived, would have been my wife". "Min" Josephine Ryan and her sister, Phyllis, had been couriers to the GPO. They also visited Kilmainham Gaol, before his execution, and managed to evade arrest. Min, a founder of Cumann na mBan, managed to escape from Ireland to America; she later married Richard Mulcahy.

Before his execution, Mac Diarmada shared a cell with the Irish Volunteers leader from Wexford Robert Brennan who asked MacDiarmada if he was satisfied with the rising. MacDiarmada said: "I am, we put up a great fight. The lads were grand. We have awakened the old spirit. You'll see." Referring to his execution he wrote, "I feel happiness the like of which I have never experienced. I die that the Irish nation might live!”

== Commemoration ==
Seán McDermott Street (formerly Gloucester Street) in Dublin is named in his honour. So too is Sligo Mac Diarmada railway station in Sligo, and Páirc Seán Mac Diarmada, the Gaelic Athletic Association stadium in Carrick-on-Shannon, County Leitrim. MacDiarmada Road, Athlone Co.Westmeath & Sean MacDermott tower in Ballymun, demolished in 2005, were both named in honour of him. In his hometown of Kiltyclogher a statue inscribed with his final written words – see above – was erected in the village centre, and his childhood home has become a National Monument. The building which holds the national bus station (Busáras) and the Department of Social Protection is known as Áras Mhic Dhiarmada.

== Cultural legacy ==
Leitrim native Seán Fox portrayed Mac Diarmada in RTÉ's 2016 series Rebellion.

Mick Blake, a Leitrim singer/songwriter, wrote "Sean MacDiarmada (the Pride of Corranmore)" to commemorate the centenary of the 1916 Rising. The song was commissioned by New York businessman Joseph Mc Manus.

== See also ==
- List of people on the postage stamps of Ireland
- List of members of the Irish Republican Brotherhood
