= Taghmon =

Village in County Wexford, Ireland

Taghmon Teach Munna (Irish)
- Village
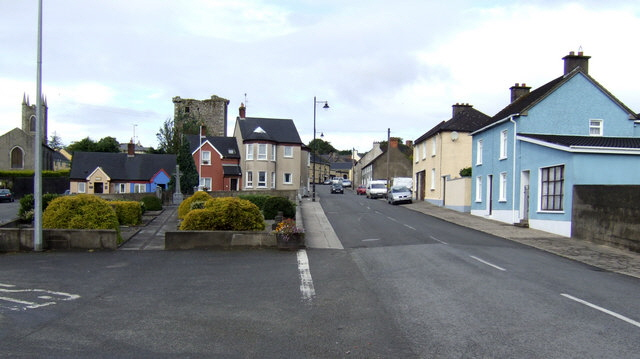

- Location in Ireland
- Coordinates: 52°19′N 6°40′W
- Country: Ireland
- Province: Leinster
- County: County Wexford

Government
  - Dáil constituency: Wexford

Population (2016)
  - Total: 585
- Time zone: UTC±0 (WET)
  - Summer (DST): UTC+1 (IST)
- Eircode: Y35
- Area codes: +353(0)53

Taghmon (/tæˈmʊn/; Irish: Teach Munna, meaning 'house of Munn') is a village in County Wexford, Ireland. It lies on the R738 regional road, 14 km (9 mi) west of Wexford town and 25 km (16 mi) east-southeast of New Ross. The village is in a townland and civil parish of the same name.

== History ==
It can be established, from historical records, that the area now comprising the village of Taghmon has been inhabited since at least as early as 595 AD. Saint Fintan Munnu was granted land there in circa 597 by a chieftain, Dímma mac Áeda Croin who later became a cleric and was buried among the monks at the monastery. His followers, were residing in the area then known as 'Achadh Liathdrom', which translates as 'the grey field on (or near) the ridge of a hill'.

== Geography ==
Many Irish place names are topographically descriptive, and 'Achadh Liathdrom' is no exception. From the western side of the Forth Mountain, as it slopes down towards Ballintlea, a succession of gradual hills and valleys undulate their way across this part of County Wexford towards Camross, Bree and Carrigbyrne Hills. It is on one of these hills or ridges that the village of Taghmon is situated.

== Sport ==
The local Gaelic Athletic Association club, Tagmon Camross GAA, was founded in 1886. In 2011 the club won U14 hurling and football premier county finals as well as representing Wexford in the Féile Na nGael reaching the division 1 semi final. in 2015, the club's adult hurling team won the Junior County Championship to be promoted to Intermediate A. In 2016, they won the Intermediate Football Championship to be promoted to the Senior grade. Their most recent win was in 2018 when they won the Intermediate A hurling title to be promoted to Intermediate grade.

== Transport ==
'Local Link Wexford', formerly 'The Rural Bus', provides links with Wexford town, and a taxi company is situated in the village. Bus Éireann route 372 serves Taghmon on Mondays only. Route 373 use to serve Taghmon on Tuesdays only providing a link to Wexford town, Wellingtonbridge and New Ross but this service was cut in May 2026.

== Notable people ==
- James Ryan, the politician, was born at Tomcoole near Taghmon in 1891. Two of his sisters, Mary Kate and Phyllis, also from Tomcoole, were married to the Irish President Seán T. O'Kelly, while a third sister married Richard Mulcahy, Chief of Staff of the Irish Republican Army. Other members of the family were active in public life.

== See also ==
- List of towns and villages in Ireland
