= Richard Mulcahy =

Irish politician and army general (1886–1971)

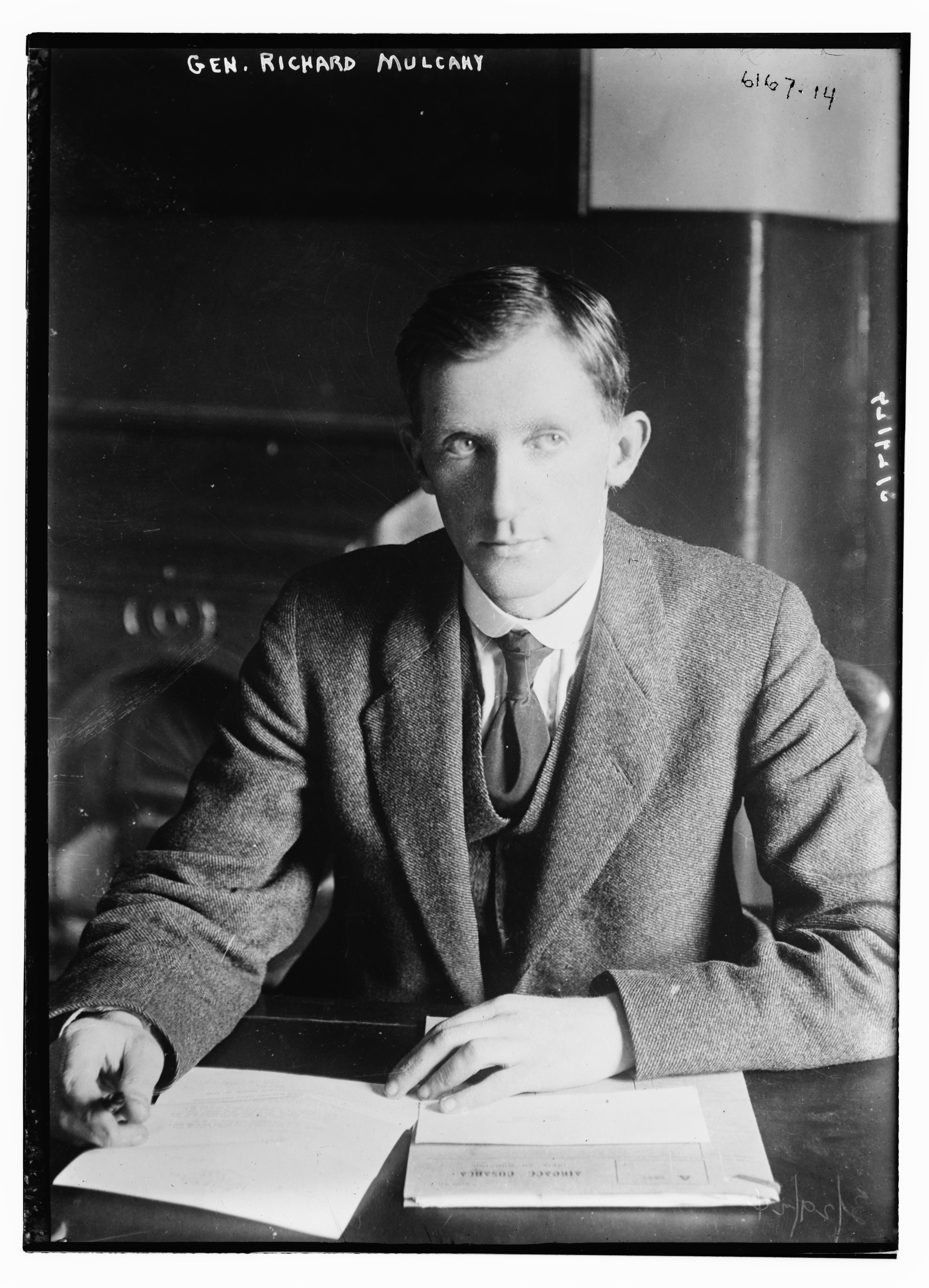
- Mulcahy, c. early 1920s

Leader of the Opposition
- In office 9 June 1944 – 18 February 1948
- Taoiseach: Éamon de Valera
- Preceded by: Thomas F. O'Higgins
- Succeeded by: Éamon de Valera

Leader of Fine Gael
- In office 2 June 1944 – 21 March 1959
- Preceded by: W. T. Cosgrave
- Succeeded by: James Dillon

President of the Irish Republican Brotherhood
- In office 14 August 1922 – 19 May 1924
- Preceded by: Michael Collins
- Succeeded by: Office abolished
Ministries
Minister for Education
In office 2 June 1954 – 20 March 1957
Taoiseach	John A. Costello
Preceded by	Seán Moylan
Succeeded by	Jack Lynch
In office 18 February 1948 – 13 June 1951
Taoiseach	John A. Costello
Preceded by	Thomas Derrig
Succeeded by	Seán Moylan
Minister for the Gaeltacht
In office 2 June 1956 – 24 October 1956
Taoiseach	John A. Costello
Preceded by	New office
Succeeded by	Patrick Lindsay
Minister for Local Government and Public Health
In office 23 June 1927 – 9 March 1932
President	W. T. Cosgrave
Preceded by	Séamus Burke
Succeeded by	Seán T. O'Kelly
Minister for Defence
In office 10 January 1922 – 19 March 1924
President	W. T. Cosgrave
Preceded by	Cathal Brugha
Succeeded by	W. T. Cosgrave (acting)
In office 22 January 1919 – 1 April 1919
President	W. T. Cosgrave
Preceded by	New office
Succeeded by	Cathal Brugha
Constituencies represented
Teachta Dála
In office February 1948 – October 1961
Constituency	Tipperary South
In office May 1944 – February 1948
Constituency	Tipperary
In office June 1938 – June 1943
Constituency	Dublin North-East
In office August 1923 – July 1937
Constituency	Dublin North
In office May 1921 – August 1923
Constituency	Dublin North-West
In office December 1918 – June 1922
Constituency	Dublin Clontarf
Senator
In office 8 September 1943 – 30 May 1944
Constituency	Labour Panel
In office 27 April 1938 – 17 June 1938
Constituency	Administrative Panel

Personal details
- Born: 10 May 1886 Waterford, Ireland
- Died: 16 December 1971 (aged 85) Dublin, Ireland
- Resting place: Littleton, County Tipperary, Ireland
- Party: Fine Gael
- Spouse: Josephine Ryan (m. 1920–1971)
- Children: 6, including Neillí
- Education: University College Dublin

Military service
- Allegiance: Irish Republic; Irish Free State
- Service: Irish Volunteers; Irish Republican Army; National Army; Irish Army
- Years of service: 1913–1924
- Rank: General
- Commands: Chief of Staff (IRA); Chief of Staff (National Army); Commander-in-Chief
- Conflicts: Easter Rising; Irish War of Independence; Irish Civil War

Military intelligence file for Richard Mulcahy

Richard James Mulcahy (10 May 1886 – 16 December 1971) was an Irish Fine Gael politician and army general who served as Minister for Education from 1948 to 1951 and 1954 to 1957, Minister for the Gaeltacht from June 1956 to October 1956, Leader of the Opposition from 1944 to 1948, Leader of Fine Gael from 1944 to 1959, Minister for Local Government and Public Health from 1927 to 1932 and Minister for Defence from January to April 1919 and 1922 to 1924. He served as a Teachta Dála (TD) from 1918 to 1938 and from 1943 to 1961 and a Senator from March 1938 to June 1938 and 1943 to 1944. He served in the cabinets of W. T. Cosgrave and John A. Costello.

He fought in the 1916 Easter Rising, served as chief of staff of the Irish Republican Army during the War of Independence and became commander-in-chief of the National Army in the Irish Civil War after the death of Michael Collins. Mulcahy earned notoriety through his order that anti-Treaty activists captured carrying arms were liable for execution and for his failure to punish Free State army soldiers for atrocities. In later years this legacy prevented him from becoming Taoiseach in a coalition government.

== Early life and 1916 Rising ==
Richard Mulcahy was born in Manor Street, Waterford, in 1886, the son of post office clerk Patrick Mulcahy and Elizabeth Slattery. He was educated at Mount Sion Christian Brothers School and later in Thurles, County Tipperary, where his father was the postmaster. One of his grandmothers was a Quaker who was disowned by her wealthy family for marrying a Catholic.

Mulcahy joined the Royal Mail (Post Office Engineering Dept.) in 1902 and worked in Thurles, Bantry, Wexford and Dublin. He was a member of the Gaelic League and joined the Irish Volunteers at the time of their formation in 1913. He was also a member of the Irish Republican Brotherhood.

He was second-in-command to Thomas Ashe (who later died on hunger strike) in an encounter with the armed Royal Irish Constabulary (RIC) at Ashbourne, County Meath during the Easter Rising in 1916—one of the few stand-out victories won by republicans in that week, and generally credited to Mulcahy's grasp of tactics. In his book on the Rising, Charles Townshend principally credits Mulcahy with the defeat of the RIC at Ashbourne, for conceiving and leading a flanking movement on the RIC column that had engaged with the Irish Volunteers. Arrested after the Rising, Mulcahy was interned at Knutsford and at the Frongoch internment camp in Wales until his release on 24 December 1916.

== War of Independence and Civil War ==
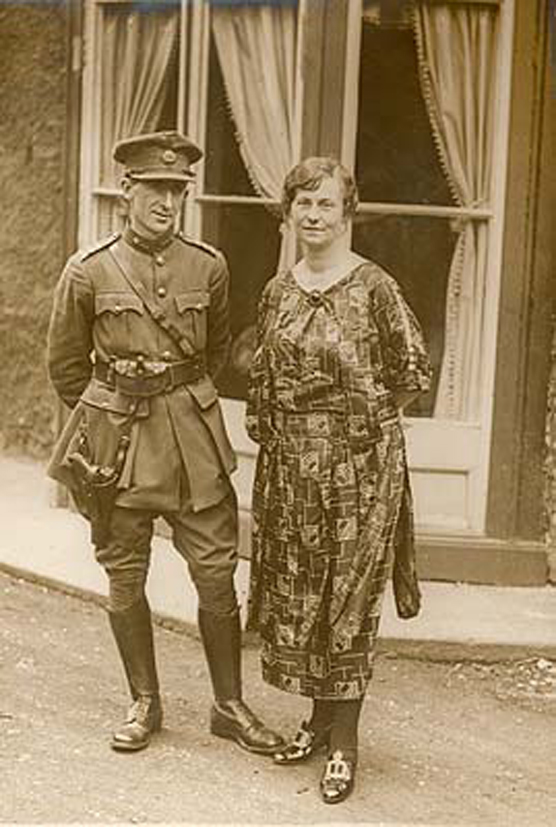
Mulcahy and his wife Min in 1922

On his release, Mulcahy immediately rejoined the republican movement and became commandant of the Dublin Brigade of the Irish Volunteers. He was elected to the First Dáil in the 1918 general election for Dublin Clontarf. He was then named Minister for Defence in the new (alternative) government and later Assistant Minister for Defence. In March 1918, he became IRA chief of staff, a position he held until January 1922.

He and Michael Collins were largely responsible for directing the military campaign against the British during the War of Independence. During this period of upheaval in 1919, he married Mary Josephine (Min) Ryan, sister of Kate and Phyllis Ryan, the successive wives of Seán T. O'Kelly; her brother was James Ryan. O'Kelly and James Ryan both later served in Fianna Fáil governments.

Mulcahy supported the Anglo-Irish Treaty of December 1921. Archive film shows that Mulcahy, as Minister of Defence, was the Irish officer who raised the Irish tricolour at the first hand-over of a British barracks to the National Army in January 1922. He was defence minister in the Provisional Government on its creation and succeeded Collins, after the latter's death, as Commander-in-Chief of the Provisional Government's forces during the subsequent Civil War.

He earned notoriety through his order that anti-Treaty activists captured carrying arms were liable for execution. A total of 77 anti-Treaty prisoners were executed by the Provisional Government. He also took almost no action against Free State troops implicated in the murder of Anti-Treaty IRA prisoners, most notably in County Kerry where men under the command of Paddy Daly carried out atrocities. Mulcahy served as Minister for Defence in the new Free State government from January 1924 until March 1924, but resigned in protest because of the sacking of the Army Council after criticism by the Executive Council over the handling of the 'Army Mutiny', when some National Army War of Independence officers almost revolted after Mulcahy demobilised many of them at the end of the Civil War. He re-entered the cabinet as Minister for Local Government and Public Health in 1927.

== Post-independence politician ==
During his period on the backbenches of Dáil Éireann his electoral record fluctuated. He was elected as TD for Dublin North-West at the 1921 and 1922 general elections. He moved to Dublin North for the election the following year, and was re-elected there in four further elections: June 1927, September 1927, 1932 and 1933.

Dublin North was abolished for the 1937 election, at which Mulcahy was defeated in the new constituency of Dublin North-East. However, he secured election to Seanad Éireann as a Senator, the upper house of the Oireachtas, representing the Administrative Panel. The 2nd Seanad sat for less than two months, and at the 1938 general election he was elected to the 10th Dáil as a TD for Dublin North-East. Defeated again in the election of 1943, he secured election to the 4th Seanad by the Labour Panel.

== Leader of Fine Gael ==
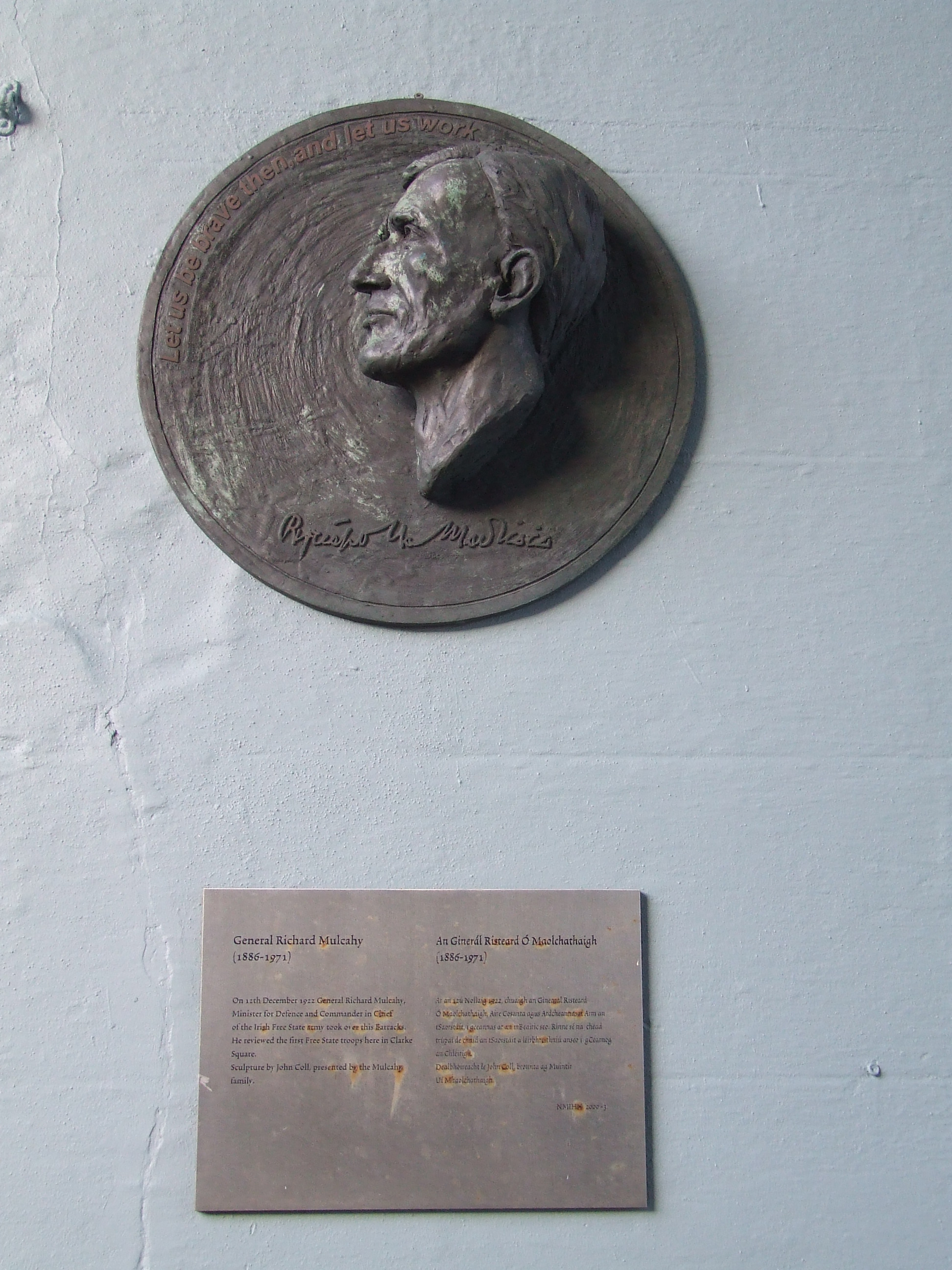
Commemorative relief of General Richard Mulcahy at Collins Barracks, Dublin

After the resignation of W. T. Cosgrave as Leader of Fine Gael in 1944, Mulcahy became party leader while still a member of the Seanad. Thomas F. O'Higgins was the parliamentary leader of the party in the Dáil at the time and Leader of the Opposition. Facing his first general election as party leader, Mulcahy drew up a list of 13 young candidates to contest seats for Fine Gael. Of the eight who ran, four were elected. He was returned to the 12th Dáil as a TD for Tipperary at the 1944 general election. While Fine Gael's decline had been slowed, its future was still in doubt.

Following the 1948 general election—at which, following boundary changes, Mulcahy was elected for Tipperary South, the dominant Fianna Fáil party finished six seats short of a majority. However, it was 37 seats ahead of Fine Gael, and conventional wisdom suggested that Fianna Fáil was the only party that could form a government. Just as negotiations got underway, however, Mulcahy realised that if Fine Gael, the Labour Party, the National Labour Party, Clann na Poblachta and Clann na Talmhan banded together, they would have only one seat fewer than Fianna Fáil—and that if they could get support from seven independents, they would be able to form a government. He played a leading role in persuading the other parties to put aside their differences and join forces to consign the Taoiseach and Fianna Fáil leader Éamon de Valera, to the opposition benches.

Since Fine Gael was by far the largest party in the prospective coalition, Mulcahy initially seemed set to become Taoiseach in a coalition government. However, he was not acceptable to Clann na Poblachta's leader, Seán MacBride. Many Irish republicans had never forgiven Mulcahy for his role in the Civil War executions carried out under the Cosgrave government in the 1920s. Consequently, MacBride let it be known that he and his party would not serve under Mulcahy. Without Clann na Poblachta, the other parties would have had 57 seats between them—17 seats short of a majority in the 147-seat Dáil. Mulcahy stepped aside and encouraged his party colleague John A. Costello, a former Attorney General, to become the parliamentary leader of Fine Gael and the coalition's candidate for Taoiseach. According to Mulcahy, the suggestion that another person serve as Taoiseach came from Labour leader William Norton. For the next decade, Costello served as the party's parliamentary leader while Mulcahy remained the nominal leader of the party.

Mulcahy went on to serve as Minister for Education under Costello from 1948 until 1951. Another coalition government came to power at the 1954 election, with Mulcahy once again stepping aside to become Minister for Education in the Second Inter-Party Government. The government fell in 1957, but Mulcahy remained as Fine Gael leader until October 1959. In October of the following year, he told his Tipperary constituents that he did not intend to contest the next election.

== Family ==
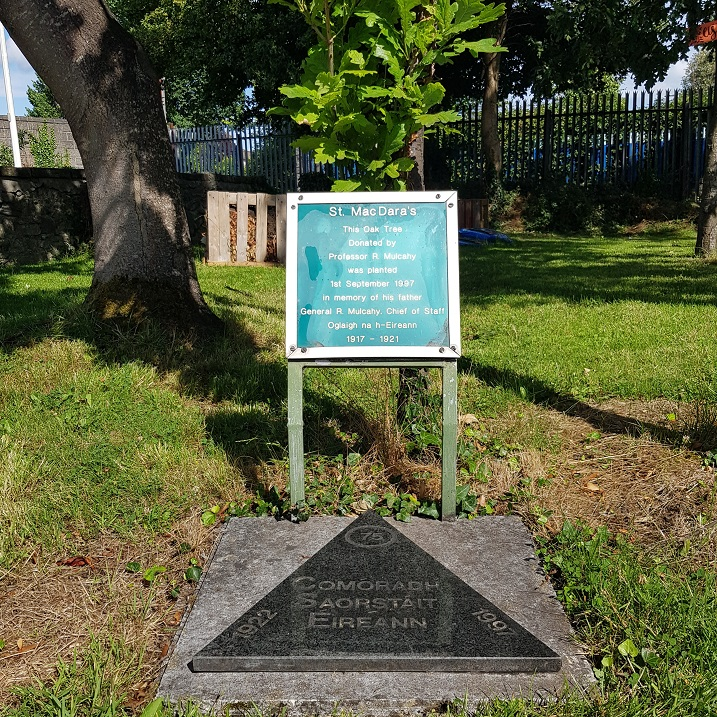
Richard Mulcahy commemorated on the grounds of Dublin secondary school Saint MacDara's in Templeogue

Richard Mulcahy married Min Ryan, the former fiancée of Seán Mac Diarmada, in 1920, and lived in a flat in Oakley House, Ranelagh. Min, a member of the Cumann na mBan Executive, had herself been involved in nationalist activity at the time of the Rising. One of his sons, Risteárd Mulcahy (1922–2016), was for many years a cardiologist in Dublin. His daughter Neillí Mulcahy (1925–2012) was one of Ireland's leading fashion designers. She designed the uniforms for Aer Lingus in 1962. Another son was the structural engineer and visual artist Seán Mulcahy (1926–2018). Another daughter, Elizabeth married Gerard Berney, and lived to the age of 105, dying in Dublin on 13 January 2026.

Richard Mulcahy died of cancer in Dublin on 16 December 1971, at the age of 85.

== See also ==
- List of members of the Oireachtas imprisoned during the Irish revolutionary period

== Bibliography ==
- 'Portrait of a Revolutionary: General Richard Mulcahy and the Founding of the Irish Free State' by Maryann Gialanella Valiulis
- 'My Father, the General: Richard Mulcahy and the Military History of the Revolution' by Risteárd Mulcahy

Parliament of the United Kingdom
New constituency	Member of Parliament for Dublin Clontarf; 1918–1922	Constituency abolished
Oireachtas
New constituency	Teachta Dála for Dublin Clontarf; 1918–1921	Constituency abolished
Political offices
New office	Minister for Defence; Jan–Apr 1919	Succeeded by Cathal Brugha
Preceded by Cathal Brugha	Minister for Defence; 1922–1924	Succeeded by W. T. Cosgrave
Preceded by Ernest Blythe	Minister for Local Government and Public Health; 1927–1932	Succeeded by Seán T. O'Kelly
Preceded by Thomas Derrig	Minister for Education; 1948–1951	Succeeded by Seán Moylan
Preceded by Seán Moylan	Minister for Education; 1954–1957	Succeeded by Jack Lynch
New office	Minister for the Gaeltacht; 1956	Succeeded by Patrick Lindsay
Party political offices
Preceded by W. T. Cosgrave	Leader of Fine Gael; 1944–1959	Succeeded by James Dillon
Preceded by Thomas F. O'Higgins (acting)	Leader of the Opposition; 1944–1948	Succeeded by Éamon de Valera
Military offices
Preceded by Eoin O'Duffy	Chief of Staff of the Defence Forces; July–August 1922	Succeeded by Seán Mac Mahon

Dáil	Election	Deputy (Party)	Deputy (Party)	Deputy (Party)	Deputy (Party)
2nd	1921	Philip Cosgrave (SF)	Joseph McGrath (SF)	Richard Mulcahy (SF)	Michael Staines (SF)
3rd	1922	Philip Cosgrave (PT-SF)	Joseph McGrath (PT-SF)	Richard Mulcahy (PT-SF)	Michael Staines (PT-SF)
4th	1923	Constituency abolished. See Dublin North			

Dáil	Election	Deputy (Party)	Deputy (Party)	Deputy (Party)	Deputy (Party)	Deputy (Party)
9th	1937	Seán T. O'Kelly (FF)	A. P. Byrne (Ind.)	Cormac Breathnach (FF)	Patrick McGilligan (FG)	Archie Heron (Lab)
10th	1938	Seán T. O'Kelly (FF)	A. P. Byrne (Ind.)	Cormac Breathnach (FF)	Patrick McGilligan (FG)	Eamonn Cooney (FF)
11th	1943	Seán T. O'Kelly (FF)	A. P. Byrne (Ind.)	Cormac Breathnach (FF)	Patrick McGilligan (FG)	Martin O'Sullivan (Lab)
12th	1944	Seán T. O'Kelly (FF)	John S. O'Connor (FF)	Cormac Breathnach (FF)	Patrick McGilligan (FG)	Martin O'Sullivan (Lab)
12th	1945 by-election	Vivion de Valera (FF)	John S. O'Connor (FF)	Cormac Breathnach (FF)	Patrick McGilligan (FG)	Martin O'Sullivan (Lab)
13th	1948	Mick Fitzpatrick (CnaP)	A. P. Byrne (Ind.)	Cormac Breathnach (FF)	3 seats from 1948 to 1969	
14th	1951	Declan Costello (FG)	A. P. Byrne (Ind.)	Cormac Breathnach (FF)	3 seats from 1948 to 1969	
14th	1952 by-election	Declan Costello (FG)	Thomas Byrne (Ind.)	Cormac Breathnach (FF)	3 seats from 1948 to 1969	
15th	1954	Declan Costello (FG)	Thomas Byrne (Ind.)	Richard Gogan (FF)	3 seats from 1948 to 1969	
16th	1957	Declan Costello (FG)	Thomas Byrne (Ind.)	Richard Gogan (FF)	3 seats from 1948 to 1969	
17th	1961	Declan Costello (FG)	Michael Mullen (Lab)	Richard Gogan (FF)	3 seats from 1948 to 1969	
18th	1965	Declan Costello (FG)	Michael Mullen (Lab)	Richard Gogan (FF)	3 seats from 1948 to 1969	
19th	1969	Hugh Byrne (FG)	Jim Tunney (FF)	Richard Gogan (FF)	David Thornley (Lab)	4 seats from 1969 to 1977
20th	1973	Hugh Byrne (FG)	Jim Tunney (FF)	Richard Gogan (FF)	David Thornley (Lab)	4 seats from 1969 to 1977
21st	1977	Constituency abolished. See Dublin Finglas and Dublin Cabra				

Dáil	Election	Deputy (Party)	Deputy (Party)	Deputy (Party)	Deputy (Party)
22nd	1981	Jim Tunney (FF)	Michael Barrett (FF)	Mary Flaherty (FG)	Hugh Byrne (FG)
23rd	1982 (Feb)	Jim Tunney (FF)	Michael Barrett (FF)	Mary Flaherty (FG)	Proinsias De Rossa (WP)
24th	1982 (Nov)	Jim Tunney (FF)	Michael Barrett (FF)	Mary Flaherty (FG)	Proinsias De Rossa (WP)
25th	1987	Jim Tunney (FF)	Michael Barrett (FF)	Mary Flaherty (FG)	Proinsias De Rossa (WP)
26th	1989	Jim Tunney (FF)	Michael Barrett (FF)	Mary Flaherty (FG)	Proinsias De Rossa (WP)
27th	1992	Noel Ahern (FF)	Róisín Shortall (Lab)	Mary Flaherty (FG)	Proinsias De Rossa (DL)
28th	1997	Noel Ahern (FF)	Róisín Shortall (Lab)	Pat Carey (FF)	Proinsias De Rossa (DL)
29th	2002	Noel Ahern (FF)	Róisín Shortall (Lab)	Pat Carey (FF)	3 seats from 2002
30th	2007	Noel Ahern (FF)	Róisín Shortall (Lab)	Pat Carey (FF)	3 seats from 2002
31st	2011	Dessie Ellis (SF)	Róisín Shortall (Lab)	John Lyons (Lab)	3 seats from 2002
32nd	2016	Dessie Ellis (SF)	Róisín Shortall (SD)	Noel Rock (FG)	3 seats from 2002
33rd	2020	Dessie Ellis (SF)	Róisín Shortall (SD)	Paul McAuliffe (FF)	3 seats from 2002
34th	2024	Dessie Ellis (SF)	Rory Hearne (SD)	Paul McAuliffe (FF)	3 seats from 2002

Dáil	Election	Deputy (Party)	Deputy (Party)	Deputy (Party)	Deputy (Party)	Deputy (Party)	Deputy (Party)	Deputy (Party)	Deputy (Party)
4th	1923	Alfie Byrne (Ind.)	Francis Cahill (CnaG)	Margaret Collins-O'Driscoll (CnaG)	Seán McGarry (CnaG)	William Hewat (BP)	Richard Mulcahy (CnaG)	Seán T. O'Kelly (Rep)	Ernie O'Malley (Rep)
4th	1925 by-election	Alfie Byrne (Ind.)	Patrick Leonard (CnaG)	Margaret Collins-O'Driscoll (CnaG)	Oscar Traynor (Rep)	William Hewat (BP)	Richard Mulcahy (CnaG)	Seán T. O'Kelly (Rep)	Ernie O'Malley (Rep)
5th	1927 (Jun)	Alfie Byrne (Ind.)	John Byrne (CnaG)	Margaret Collins-O'Driscoll (CnaG)	Oscar Traynor (SF)	Denis Cullen (Lab)	Richard Mulcahy (CnaG)	Seán T. O'Kelly (FF)	Kathleen Clarke (FF)
6th	1927 (Sep)	Alfie Byrne (Ind.)	John Byrne (CnaG)	Margaret Collins-O'Driscoll (CnaG)	Patrick Leonard (CnaG)	James Larkin (IWL)	Richard Mulcahy (CnaG)	Seán T. O'Kelly (FF)	Eamonn Cooney (FF)
6th	1928 by-election	Alfie Byrne (Ind.)	John Byrne (CnaG)	Margaret Collins-O'Driscoll (CnaG)	Patrick Leonard (CnaG)	Vincent Rice (CnaG)	Richard Mulcahy (CnaG)	Seán T. O'Kelly (FF)	Eamonn Cooney (FF)
6th	1929 by-election	Thomas F. O'Higgins (CnaG)	John Byrne (CnaG)	Margaret Collins-O'Driscoll (CnaG)	Patrick Leonard (CnaG)	Vincent Rice (CnaG)	Richard Mulcahy (CnaG)	Seán T. O'Kelly (FF)	Eamonn Cooney (FF)
7th	1932	Alfie Byrne (Ind.)	John Byrne (CnaG)	Margaret Collins-O'Driscoll (CnaG)	Oscar Traynor (FF)	Cormac Breathnach (FF)	Richard Mulcahy (CnaG)	Seán T. O'Kelly (FF)	Eamonn Cooney (FF)
8th	1933	Alfie Byrne (Ind.)	Patrick Belton (CnaG)	Vincent Rice (CnaG)	Oscar Traynor (FF)	Cormac Breathnach (FF)	Richard Mulcahy (CnaG)	Seán T. O'Kelly (FF)	Eamonn Cooney (FF)
9th	1937	Constituency abolished. See Dublin North-East and Dublin North-West							

Dáil	Election	Deputy (Party)	Deputy (Party)	Deputy (Party)	Deputy (Party)
22nd	1981	Ray Burke (FF)	John Boland (FG)	Nora Owen (FG)	3 seats 1981–1992
23rd	1982 (Feb)	Ray Burke (FF)	John Boland (FG)	Nora Owen (FG)	3 seats 1981–1992
24th	1982 (Nov)	Ray Burke (FF)	John Boland (FG)	Nora Owen (FG)	3 seats 1981–1992
25th	1987	Ray Burke (FF)	John Boland (FG)	G. V. Wright (FF)	3 seats 1981–1992
26th	1989	Ray Burke (FF)	Nora Owen (FG)	Seán Ryan (Lab)	3 seats 1981–1992
27th	1992	Ray Burke (FF)	Nora Owen (FG)	Seán Ryan (Lab)	Trevor Sargent (GP)
28th	1997	Ray Burke (FF)	Nora Owen (FG)	G. V. Wright (FF)	Trevor Sargent (GP)
28th	1998 by-election	Seán Ryan (Lab)	Nora Owen (FG)	G. V. Wright (FF)	Trevor Sargent (GP)
29th	2002	Seán Ryan (Lab)	Jim Glennon (FF)	G. V. Wright (FF)	Trevor Sargent (GP)
30th	2007	James Reilly (FG)	Michael Kennedy (FF)	Darragh O'Brien (FF)	Trevor Sargent (GP)
31st	2011	James Reilly (FG)	Alan Farrell (FG)	Brendan Ryan (Lab)	Clare Daly (SP)
32nd	2016	Constituency abolished. See Dublin Fingal			

Dáil	Election	Deputy (Party)	Deputy (Party)	Deputy (Party)	Deputy (Party)	Deputy (Party)
9th	1937	Alfie Byrne (Ind.)	Oscar Traynor (FF)	James Larkin (Ind.)	3 seats 1937–1948	
10th	1938	Alfie Byrne (Ind.)	Oscar Traynor (FF)	Richard Mulcahy (FG)	3 seats 1937–1948	
11th	1943	Alfie Byrne (Ind.)	Oscar Traynor (FF)	James Larkin (Lab)	3 seats 1937–1948	
12th	1944	Alfie Byrne (Ind.)	Oscar Traynor (FF)	Harry Colley (FF)	3 seats 1937–1948	
13th	1948	Alfie Byrne (Ind.)	Oscar Traynor (FF)	Harry Colley (FF)	Jack Belton (FG)	Peadar Cowan (CnaP)
14th	1951	Alfie Byrne (Ind.)	Oscar Traynor (FF)	Harry Colley (FF)	Jack Belton (FG)	Peadar Cowan (Ind.)
15th	1954	Alfie Byrne (Ind.)	Oscar Traynor (FF)	Harry Colley (FF)	Jack Belton (FG)	Denis Larkin (Lab)
15th	1956 by-election	Patrick Byrne (FG)	Oscar Traynor (FF)	Harry Colley (FF)	Jack Belton (FG)	Denis Larkin (Lab)
16th	1957	Patrick Byrne (FG)	Oscar Traynor (FF)	Charles Haughey (FF)	Jack Belton (FG)	Denis Larkin (Lab)
17th	1961	Patrick Byrne (FG)	George Colley (FF)	Charles Haughey (FF)	Jack Belton (FG)	Eugene Timmons (FF)
17th	1963 by-election	Patrick Byrne (FG)	George Colley (FF)	Charles Haughey (FF)	Paddy Belton (FG)	Eugene Timmons (FF)
18th	1965	Patrick Byrne (FG)	George Colley (FF)	Charles Haughey (FF)	Paddy Belton (FG)	Denis Larkin (Lab)
19th	1969	Conor Cruise O'Brien (Lab)	Eugene Timmons (FF)	Charles Haughey (FF)	Paddy Belton (FG)	4 seats 1969–1977
20th	1973	Conor Cruise O'Brien (Lab)	Eugene Timmons (FF)	Charles Haughey (FF)	Paddy Belton (FG)	4 seats 1969–1977
21st	1977	Constituency abolished				

Dáil	Election	Deputy (Party)	Deputy (Party)	Deputy (Party)	Deputy (Party)
22nd	1981	Michael Woods (FF)	Liam Fitzgerald (FF)	Seán Dublin Bay Rockall Loftus (Ind.)	Michael Joe Cosgrave (FG)
23rd	1982 (Feb)	Michael Woods (FF)	Maurice Manning (FG)	Ned Brennan (FF)	Michael Joe Cosgrave (FG)
24th	1982 (Nov)	Michael Woods (FF)	Maurice Manning (FG)	Liam Fitzgerald (FF)	Michael Joe Cosgrave (FG)
25th	1987	Michael Woods (FF)	Pat McCartan (WP)	Liam Fitzgerald (FF)	Michael Joe Cosgrave (FG)
26th	1989	Michael Woods (FF)	Pat McCartan (WP)	Liam Fitzgerald (FF)	Michael Joe Cosgrave (FG)
27th	1992	Michael Woods (FF)	Tommy Broughan (Lab)	Liam Fitzgerald (FF)	Seán Kenny (Lab)
28th	1997	Michael Woods (FF)	Tommy Broughan (Lab)	Martin Brady (FF)	Michael Joe Cosgrave (FG)
29th	2002	Michael Woods (FF)	Tommy Broughan (Lab)	Martin Brady (FF)	3 seats from 2002
30th	2007	Michael Woods (FF)	Tommy Broughan (Lab)	Terence Flanagan (FG)	3 seats from 2002
31st	2011	Seán Kenny (Lab)	Tommy Broughan (Lab)	Terence Flanagan (FG)	3 seats from 2002
32nd	2016	Constituency abolished. See Dublin Bay North			

Dáil	Election	Deputy (Party)	Deputy (Party)	Deputy (Party)	Deputy (Party)	Deputy (Party)	Deputy (Party)	Deputy (Party)
4th	1923	Dan Breen (Rep)	Séamus Burke (CnaG)	Louis Dalton (CnaG)	Daniel Morrissey (Lab)	Patrick Ryan (Rep)	Michael Heffernan (FP)	Seán McCurtin (CnaG)
5th	1927 (Jun)	Seán Hayes (FF)	Séamus Burke (CnaG)	John Hassett (CnaG)	Daniel Morrissey (Lab)	William O'Brien (Lab)	Michael Heffernan (FP)	Andrew Fogarty (FF)
6th	1927 (Sep)	Seán Hayes (FF)	Séamus Burke (CnaG)	John Hassett (CnaG)	Daniel Morrissey (Lab)	Timothy Sheehy (FF)	Michael Heffernan (FP)	Andrew Fogarty (FF)
7th	1932	Seán Hayes (FF)	Séamus Burke (CnaG)	John Hassett (CnaG)	Daniel Morrissey (Ind.)	Timothy Sheehy (FF)	Dan Breen (FF)	Andrew Fogarty (FF)
8th	1933	Seán Hayes (FF)	Séamus Burke (CnaG)	Richard Curran (NCP)	Daniel Morrissey (CnaG)	Martin Ryan (FF)	Dan Breen (FF)	Andrew Fogarty (FF)
9th	1937	William O'Brien (Lab)	Séamus Burke (FG)	Jeremiah Ryan (FG)	Daniel Morrissey (FG)	Martin Ryan (FF)	Dan Breen (FF)	Andrew Fogarty (FF)
10th	1938	Frank Loughman (FF)	Richard Curran (FG)	Jeremiah Ryan (FG)	Daniel Morrissey (FG)	Martin Ryan (FF)	Dan Breen (FF)	Andrew Fogarty (FF)
11th	1943	Richard Stapleton (Lab)	William O'Donnell (CnaT)	Jeremiah Ryan (FG)	Daniel Morrissey (FG)	Martin Ryan (FF)	Dan Breen (FF)	Andrew Fogarty (FF)
12th	1944	Frank Loughman (FF)	William O'Donnell (CnaT)	Richard Mulcahy (FG)	Daniel Morrissey (FG)	Mary Ryan (FF)	Dan Breen (FF)	Andrew Fogarty (FF)
12th	1947 by-election	Frank Loughman (FF)	Patrick Kinane (CnaP)	Richard Mulcahy (FG)	Daniel Morrissey (FG)	Mary Ryan (FF)	Dan Breen (FF)	Andrew Fogarty (FF)
13th	1948	Constituency abolished. See Tipperary North and Tipperary South						

Dáil	Election	Deputy (Party)	Deputy (Party)	Deputy (Party)	Deputy (Party)	Deputy (Party)
32nd	2016	Séamus Healy (WUA)	Alan Kelly (Lab)	Jackie Cahill (FF)	Michael Lowry (Ind.)	Mattie McGrath (Ind.)
33rd	2020	Martin Browne (SF)	Alan Kelly (Lab)	Jackie Cahill (FF)	Michael Lowry (Ind.)	Mattie McGrath (Ind.)
34th	2024	Constituency abolished. See Tipperary North and Tipperary South				

Dáil	Election	Deputy (Party)	Deputy (Party)	Deputy (Party)	Deputy (Party)
13th	1948	Michael Davern (FF)	Richard Mulcahy (FG)	Dan Breen (FF)	John Timoney (CnaP)
14th	1951	Michael Davern (FF)	Richard Mulcahy (FG)	Dan Breen (FF)	Patrick Crowe (FG)
15th	1954	Michael Davern (FF)	Richard Mulcahy (FG)	Dan Breen (FF)	Patrick Crowe (FG)
16th	1957	Michael Davern (FF)	Richard Mulcahy (FG)	Dan Breen (FF)	Frank Loughman (FF)
17th	1961	Michael Davern (FF)	Patrick Hogan (FG)	Dan Breen (FF)	Seán Treacy (Note: Treacy served as Ceann Comhairle in the 20th Dáil from 1973 to 1977, and was returned automatically at the 1977 election. He lost the Labour party whip in February 1985.) (Lab)
18th	1965	Don Davern (FF)	Patrick Hogan (FG)	Jackie Fahey (FF)	Seán Treacy (Lab)
19th	1969	Noel Davern (FF)	Patrick Hogan (FG)	Jackie Fahey (FF)	Seán Treacy (Lab)
20th	1973	Noel Davern (FF)	Brendan Griffin (FG)	Jackie Fahey (FF)	Seán Treacy (Lab)
21st	1977	Noel Davern (FF)	Brendan Griffin (FG)	3 seats 1977–1981	Seán Treacy (Lab)
22nd	1981	Carrie Acheson (FF)	Brendan Griffin (FG)	Seán McCarthy (FF)	Seán Treacy (Lab)
23rd	1982 (Feb)	Seán Byrne (FF)	Brendan Griffin (FG)	Seán McCarthy (FF)	Seán Treacy (Lab)
24th	1982 (Nov)	Seán Byrne (FF)	Brendan Griffin (FG)	Seán McCarthy (FF)	Seán Treacy (Lab)
25th	1987	Noel Davern (FF)	Brendan Griffin (FG)	Seán McCarthy (FF)	Seán Treacy (Note: Treacy served as Ceann Comhairle in the 25th, 26th and 27th Dáil from 1987 to 1997, and was returned automatically at the 1989 and 1992 elections.) (Ind.)
26th	1989	Noel Davern (FF)	Theresa Ahearn (FG)	Michael Ferris (Lab)	Seán Treacy (Ind.)
27th	1992	Noel Davern (FF)	Theresa Ahearn (FG)	Michael Ferris (Lab)	Seán Treacy (Ind.)
28th	1997	Noel Davern (FF)	Theresa Ahearn (FG)	Michael Ferris (Lab)	3 seats from 1997
28th	2000 by-election	Noel Davern (FF)	Theresa Ahearn (FG)	Séamus Healy (Ind.)	3 seats from 1997
28th	2001 by-election	Noel Davern (FF)	Tom Hayes (FG)	Séamus Healy (Ind.)	3 seats from 1997
29th	2002	Noel Davern (FF)	Tom Hayes (FG)	Séamus Healy (Ind.)	3 seats from 1997
30th	2007	Mattie McGrath (FF)	Tom Hayes (FG)	Martin Mansergh (FF)	3 seats from 1997
31st	2011	Mattie McGrath (Ind.)	Tom Hayes (FG)	Séamus Healy (WUA)	3 seats from 1997
32nd	2016	Constituency abolished. See Tipperary			

Dáil	Election	Deputy (Party)	Deputy (Party)	Deputy (Party)
34th	2024	Mattie McGrath (Ind.)	Michael Murphy (FG)	Séamus Healy (Ind.)
