= 1928 Seanad =

Members of the Seanad from 1928 to 1931

←	1925 Seanad	1931 Seanad	→

Overview
- Legislative body: Seanad Éireann
- Jurisdiction: Irish Free State
- Meeting place: Leinster House
- Term: 6 December 1928 – 5 December 1931
- Government: 4th Executive Council (1927–1930); 5th Executive Council (1930–1932)
- Members: 60
- Cathaoirleach: Thomas Westropp Bennett (CnaG)
- Leas-Chathaoirleach: Patrick Kenny (CnaG) (1928–1931); Patrick Hooper (Ind) (1931)

The 1928 Seanad was the part of the Seanad of the Irish Free State (1922–1936) in office from the 1928 Seanad election to the 1931 Seanad election. It sat as a second chamber to the 6th Dáil elected at the September 1927 general election. Elections to the Seanad, the Senate of the Oireachtas (parliament of the Irish Free State), took place on a triennial basis, with senators elected in stages. The Seanad of the Irish Free State was not numbered after each election, with the whole period later considered the First Seanad.

== Cathaoirleach ==
On 12 December 1928, Thomas Westropp Bennett (CnaG) was proposed as Cathaoirleach by James MacKean (CnaG) and seconded by William O'Sullivan (CnaG). James G. Douglas (Ind) was proposed by John Philip Bagwell (Ind) and seconded by Sir John Griffith (Ind). Bennett was elected by a vote of 41 to 12.

J. T. O'Farrell (Lab) was proposed as Leas-Chathaoirleach by James Charles Dowdall (FF) and seconded by Thomas Farren (Lab). Patrick Kenny was proposed by Brian O'Rourke (CnaG) and seconded by Thomas Toal (CnaG). Maurice George Moore (FF) was proposed by Michael Comyn (FF) and seconded by Joseph O'Doherty (FF). In the first ballot, in which senators could cast two votes, the votes cast were 31 to O'Farrell, 28 to Kenny, and 18 to Moore. In the second ballot, Kenny was elected with 27 votes to 21 votes for O'Farrell.

Kenny died on 22 April 1931. On 6 May 1931, Maurice George Moore (FF) was proposed by Michael Comyn (FF) and seconded by Joseph Connolly (FF). Michael O'Hanlon (CnaG) was proposed by Richard Butler and seconded by James MacKean (CnaG). Patrick Hooper (Ind) was proposed by Sir Thomas Esmonde (Ind) and seconded by Samuel Lombard Brown (Ind). In the first ballot, in which senators could cast two votes, the votes cast were 36 for Hooper, 22 for O'Hanlon, and 10 for Moore. In the second ballot, Hooper was elected with 28 votes to 18 for O'Hanlon. Hooper died on 6 September 1931. No election was held to fill the office for the remainder of the period.

== Composition of the 1928 Seanad ==
The 1928 Seanad included members nominated in 1922, and members elected at the 1922, 1925 and 1928 Seanad elections. There were a total of 60 seats in the Free State Seanad. In 1928, 19 Senators were elected.

In 1922, 30 Senators had been elected by Dáil Éireann, and 30 had been nominated by the President of the Executive Council, W. T. Cosgrave. 19 Senators had been elected at the 1925 Seanad election. The 1925 Seanad election was a popular election. Under the Constitution (Amendment No. 6) Act 1928, effective at the 1928 election and subsequent Seanad elections, the electorate for the Seanad was altered to members of the Oireachtas only.

The following table shows the composition by party when the 1928 Seanad first met on 12 December 1928.

Party	Seats
Cumann na nGaedheal	19
Fianna Fáil	8
Labour	6
Independent	27
Total	60

Fianna Fáil entered the Seanad in 1928, with six senators elected for the first time, and two sitting senators, James Charles Dowdall and Maurice George Moore, joining the parliamentary party.

== List of senators ==
1928 Seanad
Term	Name	Party
Elected in 1922 for 9 years	William Barrington	Independent
Elected in 1922 for 9 years	Eileen Costello	Independent
Elected in 1922 for 9 years	James G. Douglas	Independent
Elected in 1922 for 9 years	Michael Duffy	Labour
Elected in 1922 for 9 years	Thomas Farren	Labour
Elected in 1922 for 9 years	Alice Stopford Green	Independent
Elected in 1922 for 9 years	Sir John Griffith	Independent
Elected in 1922 for 9 years	Patrick W. Kenny	Cumann na nGaedheal
Elected in 1922 for 9 years	James J. MacKean	Cumann na nGaedheal
Elected in 1922 for 9 years	John MacLoughlin	Independent
Elected in 1922 for 9 years	William Molloy	Independent
Elected in 1922 for 9 years	Maurice George Moore	Independent
Elected in 1922 for 9 years	Brian O'Rourke	Cumann na nGaedheal
Elected in 1922 for 9 years	William O'Sullivan	Cumann na nGaedheal
Nominated in 1922 for 12 years	Countess of Desart	Independent
Nominated in 1922 for 12 years	James Charles Dowdall	Independent
Nominated in 1922 for 12 years	Sir Thomas Esmonde	Independent
Nominated in 1922 for 12 years	Earl of Granard	Independent
Nominated in 1922 for 12 years	Henry Guinness	Independent
Nominated in 1922 for 12 years	Sir John Keane	Independent
Nominated in 1922 for 12 years	Earl of Kerry	Independent
Nominated in 1922 for 12 years	James Moran	Independent
Nominated in 1922 for 12 years	Jennie Wyse Power	Independent
Elected in 1925 for 6 years	John Counihan	Cumann na nGaedheal
Elected in 1925 for 9 years	Thomas Westropp Bennett	Cumann na nGaedheal
Elected in 1925 for 9 years	Sir Edward Coey Bigger	Independent
Elected in 1925 for 9 years	Francis McGuinness	Cumann na nGaedheal
Elected in 1925 for 12 years	Henry Barniville	Cumann na nGaedheal
Elected in 1925 for 12 years	Sir Edward Bellingham	Independent
Elected in 1925 for 12 years	William Cummins	Labour
Elected in 1925 for 12 years	James Dillon	Farmers' Party
Elected in 1925 for 12 years	Michael Fanning	Cumann na nGaedheal
Elected in 1925 for 12 years	Thomas Foran	Labour
Elected in 1925 for 12 years	Sir William Hickie	Independent
Elected in 1925 for 12 years	Cornelius Kennedy	Cumann na nGaedheal
Elected in 1925 for 12 years	Thomas Linehan	Farmers' Party
Elected in 1925 for 12 years	Joseph O'Connor	Cumann na nGaedheal
Elected in 1925 for 12 years	J. T. O'Farrell	Labour
Elected in 1925 for 12 years	Michael F. O'Hanlon	Farmers' Party
Elected in 1925 for 12 years	James Parkinson	Cumann na nGaedheal
Elected in 1925 for 12 years	Thomas Toal	Cumann na nGaedheal
Elected in 1926 till 1934	Samuel Lombard Brown	Independent
Elected in 1927 till 1934	Patrick Hooper	Independent
Elected in 1928 for 3 years	Michael Comyn	Fianna Fáil
Elected in 1928 for 3 years	Seán MacEllin	Fianna Fáil
Elected in 1928 for 3 years	Ross McGillycuddy	Independent
Elected in 1928 for 3 years	Sir Walter Nugent	Independent
Elected in 1928 for 6 years	John Philip Bagwell	Independent
Elected in 1928 for 6 years	Alfie Byrne	Independent
Elected in 1928 for 6 years	Oliver St. John Gogarty	Cumann na nGaedheal
Elected in 1928 for 6 years	Andrew Jameson	Independent
Elected in 1928 for 6 years	Thomas Johnson	Labour
Elected in 1928 for 6 years	Sir Bryan Mahon	Independent
Elected in 1928 for 6 years	Richard Wilson	Cumann na nGaedheal
Elected in 1928 for 9 years	Kathleen Clarke	Fianna Fáil
Elected in 1928 for 9 years	Joseph Connolly	Fianna Fáil
Elected in 1928 for 9 years	Seán Milroy	Cumann na nGaedheal
Elected in 1928 for 9 years	Joseph O'Doherty	Fianna Fáil
Elected in 1928 for 9 years	Séumas Robinson	Fianna Fáil
Elected in 1928 for 9 years	William Sears	Cumann na nGaedheal

== Changes ==
Date	Term	Loss	Gain	Note
23 March 1929	Elected in 1928 for 9 years	Cumann na nGaedheal		Death of William Sears
10 April 1929	Elected for 9 years		Independent	Sir Nugent Everard elected to replace William Sears
28 May 1929	Elected in 1922 for 9 years	Independent		Death of Alice Stopford Green
5 June 1929	Nominated in 1922 for 12 years	Independent		Resignation of the Marquess of Lansdowne
20 June 1929	Elected till 1931		Cumann na nGaedheal	Kathleen Browne elected to replace Alice Stopford Green
20 June 1929	Elected till 1931		Independent	Laurence O'Neill elected to replace the Marquess of Lansdowne
12 July 1929	Elected for 9 years	Independent		Death of Sir Nugent Everard
23 October 1929	Elected till 1931		Independent	Richard Butler elected to replace Sir Nugent Everard
24 September 1930	Elected in 1928 for 6 years	Independent		Death of Sir Bryan Mahon
12 December 1930	Elected till 1931		Cumann na nGaedheal	Michael Staines elected to replace Sir Bryan Mahon
22 April 1931	Elected in 1922 for 9 years	Independent		Death of Patrick W. Kenny
28 May 1931	Elected till 1931		Independent	Arthur Vincent elected to replace Patrick W. Kenny
6 September 1931	Elected in 1927 till 1934	Independent		Death of Patrick Hooper
5 November 1931	Elected till 1931		Cumann na nGaedheal	George Crosbie elected to replace Patrick Hooper
