= 1931 Seanad =

Members of the Seanad from 1931 to 1934

←	1928 Seanad	1934 Seanad	→

Overview
- Legislative body: Seanad Éireann
- Jurisdiction: Irish Free State
- Meeting place: Leinster House
- Term: 6 December 1931 – 5 December 1934
- Government: 5th Executive Council (1930–1932); 6th Executive Council (1932–1933); 7th Executive Council (1933–1937)
- Members: 60
- Cathaoirleach: Thomas Westropp Bennett (CnaG)
- Leas-Chathaoirleach: Michael F. O'Hanlon (CnaG)

The 1931 Seanad was the part of the Seanad of the Irish Free State (1922–1936) in office from the 1931 Seanad election to the 1934 Seanad election. Elections to the Seanad, the Senate of the Oireachtas (parliament of the Irish Free State), took place on a triennial basis, with senators elected in stages. The 1931 Seanad included members nominated in 1922, and members elected at the 1925, 1928 and 1931 Seanad elections.

It sat as a second chamber to the 6th Dáil elected at the September 1927 general election, the 7th Dáil elected at the 1932 general election and the 8th Dáil elected at the 1933 general election. The Seanad of the Irish Free State was not numbered after each election, with the whole period later considered the First Seanad.

== Cathaoirleach ==
On 9 December 1931, Thomas Westropp Bennett (CnaG), the outgoing Cathaoirleach, was proposed for the position by William O'Sullivan (CnaG) and seconded by Sir Thomas Esmonde (Ind). He was elected without a vote.

On 20 January 1932, Michael F. O'Hanlon (CnaG) was proposed as Leas-Chathaoirleach by Richard Wilson (CnaG) and seconded by Hugh Garahan (CnaG). He was elected without a vote.

== Composition of the 1931 Seanad ==
There were a total of 60 seats in the Seanad. In 1931, 23 senators were elected. The 1925 Seanad election was a popular election. However, at the 1928 and subsequent Free State Seanad elections, the franchise was restricted to Oireachtas members.

17 Senators had been elected at the 1928 Seanad election and 19 Senators had been elected at the 1925 Seanad election. In 1922, 30 Senators had been elected by Dáil Éireann, and 30 had been nominated by the President of the Executive Council, W. T. Cosgrave.

The following table shows the composition by party when the 1931 Seanad first met on 9 December 1931.

Party	Seats
Cumann na nGaedheal	20
Fianna Fáil	12
Labour	6
Independent	22
Total	60

== List of senators ==
1931 Seanad
Term	Name	Party
Nominated in 1922 for 12 years	Countess of Desart	Independent
Nominated in 1922 for 12 years	James Charles Dowdall	Fianna Fáil
Nominated in 1922 for 12 years	Sir Thomas Esmonde	Independent
Nominated in 1922 for 12 years	Earl of Granard	Independent
Nominated in 1922 for 12 years	Henry Guinness	Independent
Nominated in 1922 for 12 years	Sir John Keane	Independent
Nominated in 1922 for 12 years	James Moran	Independent
Nominated in 1922 for 12 years	Jennie Wyse Power	Independent
Elected in 1925 for 9 years	Thomas Westropp Bennett	Cumann na nGaedheal
Elected in 1925 for 9 years	Sir Edward Coey Bigger	Independent
Elected in 1925 for 9 years	Francis McGuinness	Cumann na nGaedheal
Elected in 1925 for 12 years	Henry Barniville	Cumann na nGaedheal
Elected in 1925 for 12 years	Sir Edward Bellingham	Independent
Elected in 1925 for 12 years	William Cummins	Labour
Elected in 1925 for 12 years	James Dillon	Farmers' Party
Elected in 1925 for 12 years	Michael Fanning	Cumann na nGaedheal
Elected in 1925 for 12 years	Thomas Foran	Labour
Elected in 1925 for 12 years	Sir William Hickie	Independent
Elected in 1925 for 12 years	Cornelius Kennedy	Cumann na nGaedheal
Elected in 1925 for 12 years	Thomas Linehan	Farmers' Party
Elected in 1925 for 12 years	Joseph O'Connor	Cumann na nGaedheal
Elected in 1925 for 12 years	J. T. O'Farrell	Labour
Elected in 1925 for 12 years	Michael F. O'Hanlon	Farmers' Party
Elected in 1925 for 12 years	James Parkinson	Cumann na nGaedheal
Elected in 1925 for 12 years	Thomas Toal	Cumann na nGaedheal
Elected in 1926 till 1934	Samuel Lombard Brown	Independent
Elected in 1928 for 6 years	John Philip Bagwell	Independent
Elected in 1928 for 6 years	Alfie Byrne	Independent
Elected in 1928 for 6 years	Oliver St. John Gogarty	Cumann na nGaedheal
Elected in 1928 for 6 years	Andrew Jameson	Independent
Elected in 1928 for 6 years	Thomas Johnson	Labour
Elected in 1928 for 6 years	Richard Wilson	Cumann na nGaedheal
Elected in 1928 for 9 years	Kathleen Clarke	Fianna Fáil
Elected in 1928 for 9 years	Joseph Connolly	Fianna Fáil
Elected in 1928 for 9 years	Seán Milroy	Cumann na nGaedheal
Elected in 1928 for 9 years	Joseph O'Doherty	Fianna Fáil
Elected in 1928 for 9 years	Séumas Robinson	Fianna Fáil
Elected in 1931 for 3 years	Kathleen Browne	Cumann na nGaedheal
Elected in 1931 for 3 years	Eileen Costello	Independent
Elected in 1931 for 6 years	William O'Sullivan	Cumann na nGaedheal
Elected in 1931 for 9 years	Michael Comyn	Fianna Fáil
Elected in 1931 for 9 years	John Counihan	Cumann na nGaedheal
Elected in 1931 for 9 years	James G. Douglas	Independent
Elected in 1931 for 9 years	Michael Duffy	Labour
Elected in 1931 for 9 years	Thomas Farren	Labour
Elected in 1931 for 9 years	Hugh Garahan	Cumann na nGaedheal
Elected in 1931 for 9 years	Sir John Griffith	Independent
Elected in 1931 for 9 years	Seán MacEllin	Fianna Fáil
Elected in 1931 for 9 years	Ross McGillycuddy	Independent
Elected in 1931 for 9 years	James J. MacKean	Cumann na nGaedheal
Elected in 1931 for 9 years	John MacLoughlin	Cumann na nGaedheal
Elected in 1931 for 9 years	Daniel MacParland	Fianna Fáil
Elected in 1931 for 9 years	Maurice George Moore	Fianna Fáil
Elected in 1931 for 9 years	Laurence O'Neill	Independent
Elected in 1931 for 9 years	Brian O'Rourke	Cumann na nGaedheal
Elected in 1931 for 9 years	William Quirke	Fianna Fáil
Elected in 1931 for 9 years	David Robinson	Fianna Fáil
Elected in 1931 for 9 years	Séamus Ryan	Fianna Fáil
Elected in 1931 for 9 years	Michael Staines	Cumann na nGaedheal
Elected in 1931 for 9 years	Arthur Vincent	Independent

== Changes ==
Date	Term	Loss	Gain	Note
10 December 1931	Elected in 1928	Independent		Resignation of Alfie Byrne
2 January 1932	Elected till 1934		Cumann na nGaedheal	George Crosbie elected at a by-election to replace Byrne
24 January 1933	Elected in 1928	Fianna Fáil		Joseph O'Doherty elected to the 8th Dáil at the 1933 general election
19 April 1933	Elected till 1934		Cumann na nGaedheal	Eamonn Duggan elected at a by-election to replace O'Doherty
29 June 1933	Nominated in 1922	Independent		Death of Ellen Cuffe, Countess of Desart
30 June 1933	Elected in 1931	Fianna Fáil		Death of Séamus Ryan
2 January 1934	Elected till 1934		Fine Gael	Ernest Blythe elected at a by-election to replace the Countess of Desart
2 January 1934	Elected till 1934		Fianna Fáil	Raphael Keyes elected at a by-election to replace Ryan
21 February 1934	Elected in 1931	Independent		Resignation of Arthur Vincent
28 September 1934	Elected till 1934		Fianna Fáil	Patrick Lynch elected at a by-election to replace Vincent
28 November 1934	Elected in 1932	Fine Gael		Death of George Crosbie
