= 1925 Seanad =

Members of the Seanad from 1925 to 1928

←	1922 Seanad	1928 Seanad	→

Overview
- Legislative body: Seanad Éireann
- Jurisdiction: Irish Free State
- Meeting place: Leinster House
- Term: 6 December 1925 – 5 December 1928
- Government: 2nd Executive Council (1923–1927); 3rd Executive Council (1927); 4th Executive Council (1927–1930)
- Members: 60
- Cathaoirleach: Lord Glenavy (Ind)
- Leas-Chathaoirleach: Thomas Westropp Bennett (CnaG)

The 1925 Seanad was the part of the Seanad of the Irish Free State (1922–1936) in office from the 1925 Seanad election to the 1928 Seanad election. Elections to the Seanad, the Senate of the Oireachtas (parliament of the Irish Free State), took place on a triennial basis, with senators elected in stages. The 1925 Seanad included members nominated and elected in 1922, members elected in the 1925 Seanad election, and members elected to fill vacancies.

It sat as a second chamber to the 4th Dáil elected at the 1923 general election, the 5th Dáil elected at the June 1927 general election, and the 6th Dáil elected at the September 1927 general election. The Seanad of the Irish Free State was not numbered after each election, with the whole period later considered the First Seanad.

== Cathaoirleach ==
On 9 December 1925, Lord Glenavy (Ind), the outgoing Cathaoirleach, was proposed for the position by John MacLoughlin (Ind) and seconded by Sir John Griffith (Ind). Thomas Westropp Bennett (CnaG) was proposed by James J. MacKean (CnaG) and seconded by Oliver St. John Gogarty (CnaG). Glenavy was elected by a vote of 34 to 18. James G. Douglas (Ind), the outgoing Leas-Chathaoirleach, was proposed for the position by Andrew Jameson (Ind) and seconded by James Charles Dowdall (Ind). Thomas Westropp Bennett (CnaG) was proposed by Brian O'Rourke (CnaG), and defeated Douglas in a vote.

== Composition of the 1925 Seanad ==
There were 60 seats in the Free State Seanad. The first composition of the Seanad in 1922 consisted for 30 senators elected by Dáil Éireann (15 for 3 years and 15 for 9 years) and 30 nominated by the President of the Executive Council, W. T. Cosgrave (15 for 6 years and 15 for 12 years). The 1925 Seanad election was held to fill 19 seats; 15 seats of those whose terms had expired, and 4 seats which had been filled in by-elections since 1922. This was the only Seanad elected by universal suffrage. The new senators were sworn in on 9 December 1925.

The following table shows the composition by party when the 1925 Seanad first met on 9 December 1925.

Party	Seats
Cumann na nGaedheal	15
Labour	5
Farmers' Party	3
Independent	37
Total	60

== List of senators ==
1925 Seanad
Term	Name	Party
Nominated in 1922 for 6 years	John Philip Bagwell	Independent
Nominated in 1922 for 6 years	Henry Givens Burgess	Independent
Nominated in 1922 for 6 years	Lord Glenavy	Independent
Nominated in 1922 for 6 years	Sir Nugent Everard	Independent
Nominated in 1922 for 6 years	Edmund W. Eyre	Independent
Nominated in 1922 for 6 years	Oliver St. John Gogarty	Cumann na nGaedheal
Nominated in 1922 for 6 years	James Perry Goodbody	Independent
Nominated in 1922 for 6 years	Henry Greer	Independent
Nominated in 1922 for 6 years	Benjamin Haughton	Independent
Nominated in 1922 for 6 years	Earl of Wicklow	Independent
Nominated in 1922 for 6 years	Arthur Jackson	Independent
Nominated in 1922 for 6 years	Andrew Jameson	Independent
Nominated in 1922 for 6 years	Sir Bryan Mahon	Independent
Nominated in 1922 for 6 years	Marquess of Headfort	Independent
Nominated in 1922 for 6 years	W. B. Yeats	Independent
Elected in 1922 for 9 years	William Barrington	Independent
Elected in 1922 for 9 years	Eileen Costello	Independent
Elected in 1922 for 9 years	James G. Douglas	Independent
Elected in 1922 for 9 years	Michael Duffy	Labour
Elected in 1922 for 9 years	Thomas Farren	Labour
Elected in 1922 for 9 years	Alice Stopford Green	Independent
Elected in 1922 for 9 years	Sir John Griffith	Independent
Elected in 1922 for 9 years	Patrick W. Kenny	Cumann na nGaedheal
Elected in 1922 for 9 years	James J. MacKean	Cumann na nGaedheal
Elected in 1922 for 9 years	John MacLoughlin	Independent
Elected in 1922 for 9 years	William Molloy	Independent
Elected in 1922 for 9 years	Maurice George Moore	Independent
Elected in 1922 for 9 years	Brian O'Rourke	Cumann na nGaedheal
Elected in 1922 for 9 years	William O'Sullivan	Cumann na nGaedheal
Nominated in 1922 for 12 years	Earl of Mayo	Independent
Nominated in 1922 for 12 years	Countess of Desart	Independent
Nominated in 1922 for 12 years	James Charles Dowdall	Independent
Nominated in 1922 for 12 years	Sir Thomas Esmonde	Independent
Nominated in 1922 for 12 years	Martin Fitzgerald	Independent
Nominated in 1922 for 12 years	Earl of Granard	Independent
Nominated in 1922 for 12 years	Henry Guinness	Independent
Nominated in 1922 for 12 years	Sir John Keane	Independent
Nominated in 1922 for 12 years	James Moran	Independent
Nominated in 1922 for 12 years	Earl of Kerry	Independent
Nominated in 1922 for 12 years	Earl of Dunraven and Mount-Earl	Independent
Nominated in 1922 for 12 years	Jennie Wyse Power	Independent
Elected in 1925 for 6 years	John Counihan	Cumann na nGaedheal
Elected in 1925 for 9 years	Thomas Westropp Bennett	Cumann na nGaedheal
Elected in 1925 for 9 years	Sir Edward Coey Bigger	Independent
Elected in 1925 for 9 years	Francis McGuinness	Cumann na nGaedheal
Elected in 1925 for 12 years	Henry Barniville	Cumann na nGaedheal
Elected in 1925 for 12 years	Sir Edward Bellingham	Independent
Elected in 1925 for 12 years	William Cummins	Labour
Elected in 1925 for 12 years	James Dillon	Farmers' Party
Elected in 1925 for 12 years	Michael Fanning	Cumann na nGaedheal
Elected in 1925 for 12 years	Thomas Foran	Labour
Elected in 1925 for 12 years	Sir William Hickie	Independent
Elected in 1925 for 12 years	Cornelius Kennedy	Cumann na nGaedheal
Elected in 1925 for 12 years	Thomas Linehan	Farmers' Party
Elected in 1925 for 12 years	Joseph O'Connor	Cumann na nGaedheal
Elected in 1925 for 12 years	J. T. O'Farrell	Labour
Elected in 1925 for 12 years	Michael F. O'Hanlon	Farmers' Party
Elected in 1925 for 12 years	Stephen O'Mara	Cumann na nGaedheal
Elected in 1925 for 12 years	James Parkinson	Cumann na nGaedheal
Elected in 1925 for 12 years	Thomas Toal	Cumann na nGaedheal

== Changes ==
Date	Term	Loss	Gain	Note
27 January 1926	Nominated in 1922 for 12 years	Independent		Resignation of the Earl of Dunraven and Mount-Earl
10 February 1926	Elected till 1934		Independent	Samuel Lombard Brown elected at a by-election
26 July 1926	Elected in 1925	Cumann na nGaedheal		Death of Stephen O'Mara
26 January 1927	Elected till 1928		Independent	P. J. Brady elected at a by-election
1 March 1927	Elected in 1925	Farmers' Party	Cumann na nGaedheal	Michael F. O'Hanlon changed party in Spring 1927
9 March 1927	Nominated in 1922 for 12 years	Independent		Death of Martin Fitzgerald
23 March 1927	Elected till 1934		Independent	Patrick Hooper elected at a by-election
31 December 1927	Nominated in 1922 for 12 years	Independent		Death of the Earl of Mayo
1 March 1928	Elected till 1928		Independent	Sir Walter Nugent elected at a by-election
