= 1934 Seanad =

Members of the Seanad from 1934 to 1936

←
1931 Seanad
- Abolished (1936)
- 2nd Seanad (1938)
→

Overview
- Legislative body: Seanad Éireann
- Jurisdiction: Irish Free State
- Meeting place: Leinster House
- Term: 12 December 1934 – 19 May 1936
- Government: 7th Executive Council
- Members: 60
- Cathaoirleach: Thomas Westropp Bennett (FG)
- Leas-Chathaoirleach: Michael Comyn (FF) (1934–1936); David Robinson (FF) (1936)

The 1934 Seanad was the part of the Seanad of the Irish Free State (1922–1936) in office after the 1934 Seanad election until its abolition in 1936. Elections to the Seanad, the Senate of the Oireachtas (parliament of the Irish Free State) took place on a triennial basis, with senators elected in stages. The 1934 Seanad included members elected at the 1925, 1928, 1931 and 1934 Seanad elections.

It sat as a second chamber to the 8th Dáil elected at the 1933 general election. The Seanad of the Irish Free State was not numbered after every election, with the whole period later considered the First Seanad.

== Abolition ==
Under the Constitution (Amendment No. 24) Act 1936, the Seanad was abolished, and for a time the Oireachtas became a unicameral legislature. The last sitting of the Seanad was on 19 May 1936, with the amendment signed on 29 May 1936. In 1937, on the adoption of the Constitution of Ireland, a new Seanad Éireann was established, with elections to follow general elections to Dáil Éireann, with each new Seanad numbered. An election to the 2nd Seanad took place in March 1938.

== Cathaoirleach ==
At the first meeting on 12 December 1934, there was a contest for the position of Cathaoirleach. James J. MacKean was absent for the vote but all other members were present. William Hickie chaired the election. The two candidates were the outgoing Cathaoirleach, Thomas Westropp Bennett (Fine Gael), and the Fianna Fáil candidate, Michael Comyn. Neither of the two candidates voted and so fifty-six senators voted in the election. This resulted in a tie of twenty-eight votes each. Westropp Bennett received the votes of all twenty-one members of Fine Gael and seven independents. Comyn received the votes of his eighteen Fianna Fáil colleagues, the seven Labour Party senators, and three independents (Edward Bellingham, Thomas Linehan and Laurence O'Neill). Hickie then gave his casting vote for Westropp Bennett saying he would have done so had he had the opportunity in the division.

The following week, Comyn defeated the outgoing Leas-Chathaoirleach, Michael F. O'Hanlon of Fine Gael, by twenty-six votes to twenty-five.

On 11 March 1936, David Robinson was elected unanimously as Leas-Chathaoirleach following the appointment of Comyn to the Circuit Court.

== Composition of the 1934 Seanad ==
There were a total of 60 seats in the Free State Seanad. In 1934, 22 Senators were elected. The Seanad election in 1925 was a popular election. However, at the 1928 and subsequent elections, the franchise was restricted to Oireachtas members.

23 Senators had been elected at the 1931 Seanad election, 17 Senators had been elected at the 1928 Seanad election and 19 Senators had been elected at the 1925 Seanad election.

The following table shows the composition by party when the 1934 Seanad first met on 12 December 1934. Jennie Wyse Power joined Fianna Fáil in advance of the election.

Party	Seats
Fine Gael	22
Fianna Fáil	19
Labour	7
Independent	12
Total	60

== List of senators ==
1931 Seanad
Term	Name	Party
Elected in 1925 for 12 years	Henry Barniville	Cumann na nGaedheal
Elected in 1925 for 12 years	Sir Edward Bellingham	Independent
Elected in 1925 for 12 years	William Cummins	Labour
Elected in 1925 for 12 years	James Dillon	Farmers' Party
Elected in 1925 for 12 years	Michael Fanning	Cumann na nGaedheal
Elected in 1925 for 12 years	Thomas Foran	Labour
Elected in 1925 for 12 years	Sir William Hickie	Independent
Elected in 1925 for 12 years	Cornelius Kennedy	Cumann na nGaedheal
Elected in 1925 for 12 years	Thomas Linehan	Farmers' Party
Elected in 1925 for 12 years	Joseph O'Connor	Cumann na nGaedheal
Elected in 1925 for 12 years	J. T. O'Farrell	Labour
Elected in 1925 for 12 years	Michael F. O'Hanlon	Farmers' Party
Elected in 1925 for 12 years	James Parkinson	Cumann na nGaedheal
Elected in 1925 for 12 years	Thomas Toal	Cumann na nGaedheal
Elected in 1928 for 9 years	Kathleen Clarke	Fianna Fáil
Elected in 1928 for 9 years	Joseph Connolly	Fianna Fáil
Elected in 1928 for 9 years	Seán Milroy	Cumann na nGaedheal
Elected in 1928 for 9 years	Séumas Robinson	Fianna Fáil
Elected in 1931 for 6 years	William O'Sullivan	Cumann na nGaedheal
Elected in 1931 for 9 years	Michael Comyn	Fianna Fáil
Elected in 1931 for 9 years	John Counihan	Cumann na nGaedheal
Elected in 1931 for 9 years	James G. Douglas	Independent
Elected in 1931 for 9 years	Michael Duffy	Labour
Elected in 1931 for 9 years	Thomas Farren	Labour
Elected in 1931 for 9 years	Hugh Garahan	Cumann na nGaedheal
Elected in 1931 for 9 years	Sir John Griffith	Independent
Elected in 1931 for 9 years	Seán MacEllin	Fianna Fáil
Elected in 1931 for 9 years	Ross McGillycuddy	Independent
Elected in 1931 for 9 years	James J. MacKean	Cumann na nGaedheal
Elected in 1931 for 9 years	John MacLoughlin	Cumann na nGaedheal
Elected in 1931 for 9 years	Daniel MacParland	Fianna Fáil
Elected in 1931 for 9 years	Maurice George Moore	Fianna Fáil
Elected in 1931 for 9 years	Laurence O'Neill	Independent
Elected in 1931 for 9 years	Brian O'Rourke	Cumann na nGaedheal
Elected in 1931 for 9 years	William Quirke	Fianna Fáil
Elected in 1931 for 9 years	David Robinson	Fianna Fáil
Elected in 1931 for 9 years	Michael Staines	Cumann na nGaedheal
Elected in 1934 for 9 years	Thomas Westropp Bennett	Independent
Elected in 1934 for 9 years	James Charles Dowdall	Fianna Fáil
Elected in 1934 for 9 years	Eamonn Duggan	Fine Gael
Elected in 1934 for 9 years	Andrew Jameson	Independent
Elected in 1934 for 9 years	Raphael Keyes	Fianna Fáil
Elected in 1934 for 9 years	Thomas Johnson	Labour
Elected in 1934 for 9 years	Kathleen Browne	Fine Gael
Elected in 1934 for 9 years	Patrick Lynch	Fianna Fáil
Elected in 1934 for 9 years	Thomas Ruane	Fianna Fáil
Elected in 1934 for 9 years	Pádraic Ó Máille	Fianna Fáil
Elected in 1934 for 9 years	T. V. Honan	Fianna Fáil
Elected in 1934 for 9 years	Denis Healy	Fianna Fáil
Elected in 1934 for 9 years	James Boyle	Fianna Fáil
Elected in 1934 for 9 years	Séamus Fitzgerald	Fianna Fáil
Elected in 1934 for 9 years	Jennie Wyse Power	Fianna Fáil
Elected in 1934 for 9 years	Oliver St. John Gogarty	Fine Gael
Elected in 1934 for 9 years	Thomas Kennedy	Labour
Elected in 1934 for 9 years	Richard Wilson	Fine Gael
Elected in 1934 for 9 years	Ernest Blythe	Fine Gael
Elected in 1934 for 9 years	Patrick Baxter	Fine Gael
Elected in 1934 for 6 years	Samuel Lombard Brown	Independent
Elected in 1934 for 6 years	John Philip Bagwell	Independent
Elected in 1934 for 3 years	Sir Edward Coey Bigger	Independent

== Changes ==
Date	Term	Loss	Gain	Note
11 December 1935	Elected in 1928	Fianna Fáil		Resignation of Séumas Robinson
24 February 1936	Elected in 1931	Fianna Fáil		Michael Comyn appointed as a judge of the Circuit Court
