= Arthur Vincent =

Arthur Vincent may refer to:

- Arthur Vincent (politician) (1876–1956), Irish politician and barrister
- Arthur Vincent (rugby union) (born 1999), French rugby union player
