= Government of the 7th Dáil =

Government of the Irish Free State from 1932 to 1933

6th executive council of the Irish Free State
- Executive Council of the Irish Free State
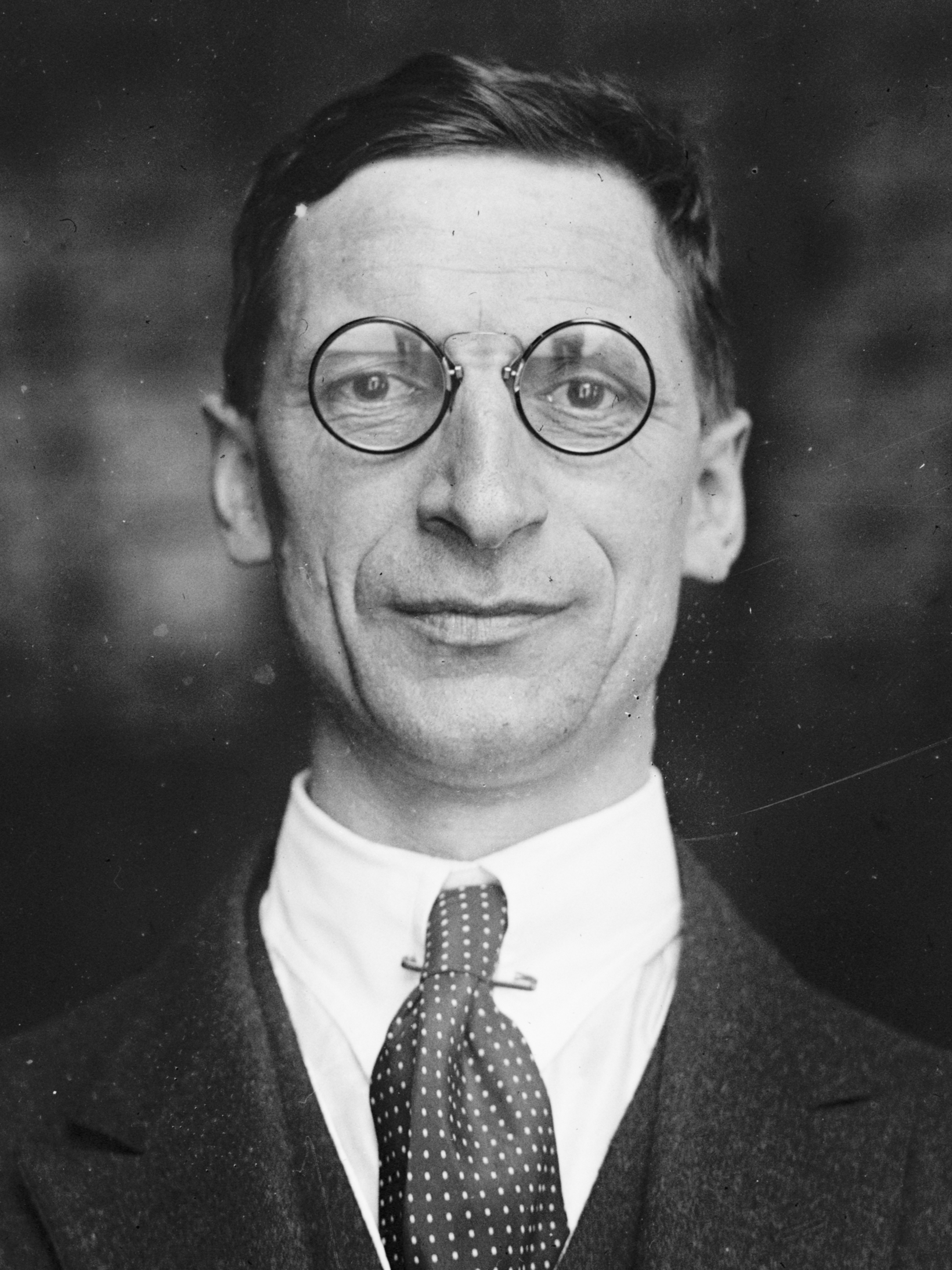
- Date formed: 9 March 1932
- Date dissolved: 8 February 1933

People and organisations
- King: George V
- Governor-General: James McNeill (Mar.–Nov. 1932); Domhnall Ua Buachalla (Nov. 1932 – Feb. 1933)
- President of the Executive Council: Éamon de Valera
- Vice-President of the Executive Council: Seán T. O'Kelly
- Total no. of members: 10
- Member party: Fianna Fáil
- Status in legislature: Minority government
- Opposition party: Cumann na nGaedheal
- Opposition leader: W. T. Cosgrave

History
- Election: 1932 general election
- Legislature terms: 7th Dáil; 1st Seanad (1931–1934)
- Predecessor: 5th executive council
- Successor: 7th executive council

The 6th executive council of the Irish Free State (9 March 1932 – 8 February 1933) was formed after the 1932 general election to the 7th Dáil held on 16 February. It was led by Fianna Fáil leader Éamon de Valera as President of the Executive Council, taking office after ten years of government led by W. T. Cosgrave of Cumann na nGaedheal. De Valera had previously served as President of Dáil Éireann, or President of the Republic, from April 1919 to January 1922 during the revolutionary period of the Irish Republic. It lasted for 336 days.

== Nomination of President of the Executive Council ==
The 7th Dáil first met on 9 March 1932. In the debate on the nomination of the President of the Executive Council, Fianna Fáil leader Éamon de Valera was proposed, and the motion was approved by 81 votes to 68. The Labour Party supported the nomination of de Valera and the formation of the executive council, but did not form part of the government. He was then appointed as president by Governor-General James McNeill.

9 March 1932; Nomination of Éamon de Valera (FF) as President of the Executive Council; Motion proposed by Michael Kilroy and seconded by Oscar Traynor; Absolute majority: 77/153
Vote	Parties	Votes
Yes	Fianna Fáil (71), Labour Party (7), Independents (3)	81 / 153
No	Cumann na nGaedheal (55), Farmers' Party (2), Independents (11)	68 / 153
Absent or Not voting	Cumann na nGaedheal (1), Independent (1), Ceann Comhairle (1)	3 / 153
Vacant	1	1 / 153

== Members of the Executive Council ==
The members of the Executive Council were proposed by the president and approved by the Dáil. They were then appointed by the Governor-General.

Office	Name
President of the Executive Council	Éamon de Valera
Minister for External Affairs	Éamon de Valera
Vice-President of the Executive Council	Seán T. O'Kelly
Minister for Local Government and Public Health	Seán T. O'Kelly
Minister for Lands and Fisheries	P. J. Ruttledge
Minister for Industry and Commerce	Seán Lemass
Minister for Finance	Seán MacEntee
Minister for Agriculture	James Ryan
Minister for Defence	Frank Aiken
Minister for Education	Thomas Derrig
Minister for Justice	James Geoghegan
Minister for Posts and Telegraphs	Joseph Connolly (Note: Connolly was appointed as Minister for Posts and Telegraphs while a member of Seanad Éireann, and became the first person to be a Minister while not a member of Dáil Éireann.)

== Parliamentary secretaries ==
On 10 March 1932, the Executive Council appointed Parliamentary secretaries on the nomination of the President.

Name	Office
Gerald Boland	Government Chief Whip
Gerald Boland	Parliamentary secretary to the Minister for Defence
Hugo Flinn	Parliamentary secretary to the Minister for Finance
Conn Ward	Parliamentary secretary to the Minister for Local Government and Public Health
=== Appointment 5 November 1932 ===
Name	Office
Seán O'Grady	Parliamentary secretary to the Minister for Lands and Fisheries
