= Richard A. Butler =

Richard A. Butler may refer to:

- Rab Butler (Richard Austen Butler, 1902–1982), British Conservative politician
- Richard A. Butler (Irish politician), Irish independent Senator
