= Frances Moran =

Irish barrister and legal scholar

Frances Elizabeth Moran (6 December 1893 – 7 October 1977) was an Irish barrister and legal scholar. She was Reid Professor of Criminal Law from 1925 to 1930, and Regius Professor of Laws from 1944 to 1963 at Trinity College, Dublin (TCD). She was called to the Irish Bar in 1924 and the English Bar in 1940. She was the first woman to become a law lecturer in Ireland and also to hold a chair at TCD when she was made Reid Professor. She became the first woman to take silk in Ireland, and indeed across the British Isles, when she was made a Senior Counsel in 1941.

== Early life and education ==
Moran was born on 6 December 1893 in Dublin, Ireland. She was the second daughter of James Moran, a businessman and politician. She was educated at Dominican College Sion Hill, an all-girls school in Dublin. She matriculated into Trinity College Dublin (TCD) in 1911 to study modern languages (French and English), and graduated in 1915. She remained at TCD to study law, and graduated with a Bachelor of Laws (LLB) degree in 1918 and a Doctor of Laws (LLD) degree by examination in 1919.

== Career ==
Moran was called to the Irish Bar in 1924. She was additionally called to the English Bar, at Gray's Inn, in 1940. On 9 May 1941, she became the first woman to become a Senior Counsel in Ireland when she was called to the Inner Bar. As such, she was the first woman to take silk in the British Isles, with the first King's Counsel in the United Kingdom (Margaret Kidd) not called until 1948. As a barrister, she specialised in conveyancing and only rarely appeared in court.

From 1925 to 1930, Moran was Reid Professor of Criminal Law at Trinity College, Dublin (TCD). As such, she was the first woman to become a law lecturer in Ireland and also to the first hold a chair at TCD. She was also Regius Professor of Laws from 1944-1963. In 1968, she became the first woman to be made an honorary fellow of Trinity College Dublin.
