= Michael Comyn =

Irish politician, barrister and judge (1871–1952)

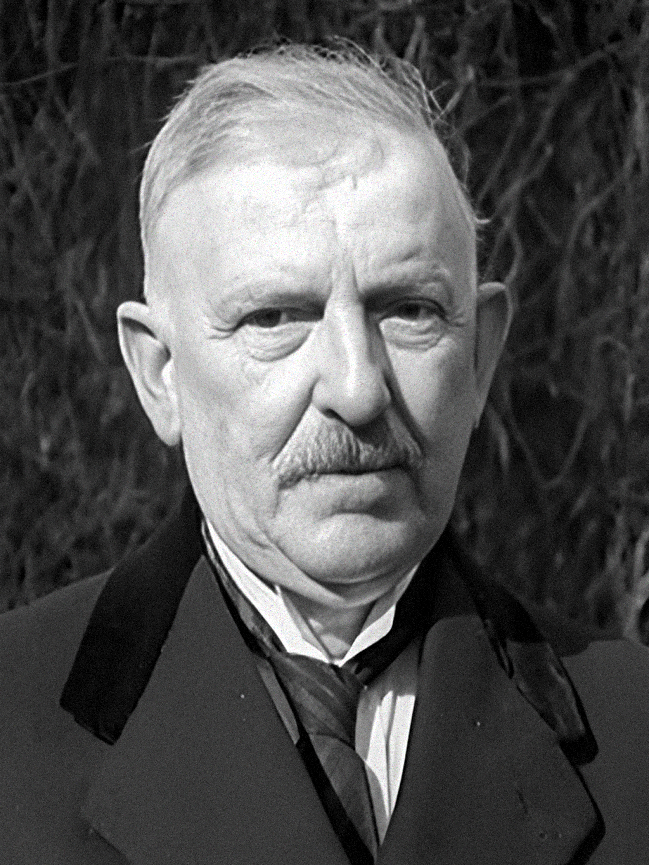
- Comyn in 1933

Leas-Chathaoirleach of Seanad Éireann
- In office 12 December 1934 – 24 February 1936
- Preceded by: Michael F. O'Hanlon
- Succeeded by: David Robinson

Senator
- In office 12 December 1928 – 24 February 1936

Personal details
- Born: 6 June 1871 Ballyvaughan, County Clare, Ireland
- Died: 6 October 1952 (aged 81) County Clare, Ireland
- Party: Fianna Fáil
- Spouse: Marcella Blake-Forster (m. 1924)
- Children: 3
- Relatives: James Comyn (nephew)
- Education: King's Inns

Michael Comyn (6 June 1871 – 6 October 1952) was an Irish barrister, Fianna Fáil Senator and later a judge on the Circuit Court. He was also a member of the British Civil Service, geologist, discoverer and operator of mines, and finally "litigant in one of the longest cases ever heard in the Irish courts". As a lawyer-turned litigant, he recounted that "it was his last case, and he won it: a far cry from his first case as a young barrister...it was a bad case and I did it badly".

== Early life ==
Comyn was born at Clareville, Ballyvaughan, County Clare, in 1871, the eldest son and the second of seven children of James Comyn of Kilshanny, a tenant farmer and secretary of the local branch of the Land League. His mother was Ellenora, daughter of Thomas Quin, of Fanta Glebe, Kilfenora, County Clare. In 1879, the Comyn family were evicted from their home by Lord Clanricarde's agent and the family moved to Gortnaboul in Kilshanny parish, County Clare. Comyn attended the local school and was taught by Vere Ryan, father of the republican Frank Ryan. Later he attended Hugh Brady's school in Ruan, County Clare. This school had a reputation for tutoring its students successfully for civil service examinations. He boarded with his aunt (married to Casey) in Ruan during the week.

== Legal career ==
At the age of 19, Comyn sat for an examination to be an excise officer; 2,500 people entered and 50 were selected. He was assigned to Powers' Distillery, Dublin, for a six-week introduction course. He was later assigned to Lancaster, where he both worked in excise and attended Preston College. He returned to Dublin to study law at University College Dublin. He attended King's Inns while continuing to work during the day. Despite being transferred to Burton Salmon, Yorkshire, in his last year at the King's Inns, which meant he was not able attend the required lectures, he persisted. He was one lecture short at the time of the final examination. He put himself forward for the Victoria Prize, which he won and it enabled him to complete his studies. Comyn was called to the Irish bar in 1898 and joined the Munster Circuit in 1900. He built up a successful practice and he became a King's Counsel in June 1914. "A barrister at last, but a civil servant still. With no legal back ground, no solicitor acquaintances and no influential friends, the bar looked a particularly hazardous profession". He decided to join the Munster circuit and presented himself at quarter sessions in his home county Clare.

Comyn was active in nationalist politics. During the 1916 Easter Rising he was in Kansas City, USA, with Arthur Griffith, founder of Sinn Féin. When he returned from the US he became involved in the defense of republican prisoners and was introduced to the Military Courts regime. He would argue several cases before the House of Lords in his time.

=== Re. Clifford and O'Sullivan ===
In Re. Clifford and O'Sullivan', 1921 Comyn represented two of the 42 men under sentence of death from a military tribunal for possession of arms. It was a solicitor named James G. Skinner from Mitchelstown, County Cork, who approached Comyn and his brother James with the words: "Do anything but do something"..."Invent something if necessary". It was Michael Comyn who decided to apply for Prohibition (an old and seldom used remedy) which would be new to the authorities. The case proceeded forward to the House of Lords.

Initially, the application was made to the Chancery Division in Ireland. In 1920, two proclamations were announced, one by Viscount French, the Lord Lieutenant, putting certain areas including County Cork under martial law and the second by the British Commander-in-Chief in Ireland Sir Nevil Macready requiring all civilians who did not hold a permit to surrender all arms, ammunition and explosives by 27 December of that year. Failure to comply meant that any unauthorised person found in possession of arms, ammunition or explosives, would become liable to trial by Military Court and on conviction the sentence was death. General Sir E.P. Strickland was appointed by the Commander-in-Chief Macready to be military governor of the martial law area. It was his duty to establish and organise the Military Courts. In April 1921, 42 individuals, including Clifford and O'Sullivan, were arrested near Mitchelstown. On 3 May 1921, 42 civilians were tried by a military court on a charge of being in possession of arms and ammunition. They were sentenced to death "subject to confirmation".

Ten days later, 10 May 1921, Mr. Justice Powell sought a Writ of Prohibition against Sir Nevil Macready and General Strickland to prohibit them; "(1) from further proceeding the trial of applicants, (2) from pronouncing or confirming any judgment upon them, (3) from carrying any judgment upon them into execution and (4) from otherwise interfering with them". The Prohibition sought was that the Military Court was in fact illegal and therefore had no jurisdiction to try the applicants or to adjudicate in any matter related to them. Mr. Justice Powell listened to this unusual application in his division but "felt constrained to dismiss it". In the appeal to the Court of Appeal - the Crown's case was that the Preliminary objection that Mr. Justice Powell's order was "made in a criminal cause or matter within s.50 of the Supreme Court of Judicature Act, 1877, therefore no appeal lay. "This contention succeeded with O'Connor, M.R., and Lord Justices Ronan and O'Connel, and the appeal was duly dismissed". On 16 June 1921 (just six weeks after the verdict of the Military Court) the case appeared before the House of Lords in London for hearing on the Preliminary objection. Sir John Simon, KC, led Michael Comyn, James Comyn (Michael's nephew), their colleague, Joe McCarthy (later appointed a judge) and Richard O'Sullivan of the English court appeared before the House.

The House of Lords heard the argument but then decided to adjourn the preliminary objection hearing until the hearing of the case on its merits. This hearing over five days took place in July. Delay and elaborate review of the law throughout history, taking account of other wars, civil wars and revolutions was a tactic specifically used. A most detailed review of the conditions in which prisoners were held in custody was cited. A red herring by Comyn drew mention to a link to Comyns' Digest of the 18th century and where to place the apostrophe. On 28 July 1921 (only 10 weeks from the original trial by Military Court), Their Lordships, 4 from Scotland and Lord Atkinson from Ireland, gave judgment, which was most unsatisfactory. James Comyn writes "On the strongly argued Preliminary objection that no appeal lay from Mr. Justice Powell or to them, they ruled against and against the unanimous judgment of the Court of Appeal.... They went on to hold that Prohibition was inappropriate because first, the Military Court was not a judicial tribunal and secondly, the officers constituting it were functi officio. They refrained from saying too much about the merits of the case because the use of habeas corpus 'might be attempted'".

James Comyn cites the Clifford and O'Sullivan case as a leading authority in the field of constitutional law. The lives of 42 men were at stake. Michael Comyn revealed later that King George V became aware of the details about the 42 men facing the death penalty. He was reported to be shocked and personally "interfered" to ensure that the sentences of death were not carried out. None of the 42 men were executed. Shortly after the Anglo-Irish Treaty, these men received their freedom.

"In Michael Comyn's view the case had been brought to an end through the intervention of King George V, who, he said, secured a promise from the prime minister that no executions would take place and that Peace would be made". It also notes that no republican prisoner whose case Comyn took up during the "troubles" suffered the death penalty. Other notable cases included his appeal to the House of Lords on behalf of the suffragette Georgina Frost.

After the truce in 1921 it is stated that Comyn met with Arthur Griffith and Austin Stack in London. He is said to have revealed "intelligence" from a highly placed British source that Lloyd George (Prime Minister) "would negotiate on lines that would satisfy Smuts and would go to the country rather than to war if those negotiations failed".

== Civil War ==
During the Irish War of Independence, Comyn was involved in the defense of Irish republican prisoners at the High Court and before the Military Courts. He also defended Republican prisoners during the Irish Civil War. He also took part in some significant inquests notably the two that arose with the deaths of Cathal Brugha and Harry Boland with the intention to disrupt them on behalf of the IRA. Erskine Childers was one of the principal secretaries to the Irish mission when the Treaty was being negotiated in London. The split between the pro- and the anti-treaty factions resulted in the former becoming the government and the latter under (de Valera) engaged in the hostilities.

In the Irish Civil War in Cork in 1922, Erskine Childers operated the printing press turning out anti-Treaty propaganda. In October 1922, Éamon de Valera made Childers secretary of his shadow "government" so he returned to Dublin. He returned with his typewriter and a small Colt automatic revolver (given to him by Michael Collins). While staying with his cousin Robert Barton (one of the signatories of the treaty) in Wicklow, he was captured by the forces of the Irish Free State Government. His capture made headlines and it is reported that it was noted with satisfaction by Winston Churchill who said he was a "mischief making renegade" and added "Such as he is may all who hate us be". The charge against him was the "illegal possession of arms - the Colt revolver". Erskine Childers was due to stand trial before a Military Court on 17 November 1922. He was imprisoned in Portobello Barracks and ask his long-time friend Michael Comyn to defend him. He had often hidden in Comyn's home in Leeson Park.

At his trial, which was in camera, Childers was convicted. Then with Patrick Lynch, Comyn went to the High Court, presided over by Sir Charles O'Connor, and conducted a spirited fight based purely on technical grounds. It failed and they appealed. Before the appeal was heard, news came in an announcement from London, that Childers had been shot at dawn on 24 November at Beggar's Bush Barracks. It appears that measures to rescue him were known to the Free State authorities and thus forestalled.

The Judges of the Court of Appeal echoed this when the case was held a few days later. It had a profound impact on Comyn when Childers was executed while the case was on appeal. He said "It was a complete negation of justice, the worst I have ever known, to execute a man whose case for life or death was actually under argument and awaiting judgment".

Comyn knew Michael Collins but Comyn decided to take the anti-treaty side during the Civil War. After the Civil War, he became principal legal adviser to de Valera and Fianna Fáil, advising on the formation of the party and the founding of The Irish Press newspaper. It is said that on the advice of Gavan Duffy and Comyn to the Irish Free State that they could withhold payment of the land annuities to Britain.

In 1924, Comyn married Marcella Blake-Forster, of Ballykeal House, Kilfenora, County Clare. They had two daughters; Marcella and Eleanor Rose; and a son who died in infancy.

== Political career ==
In 1926 he became a founder member of Fianna Fáil and in 1928 he was elected as one of six Fianna Fáil Senators to the Free State Seanad under the leadership of Joseph Connolly for three years. He served as senator between 1928 and 1936 and was Leas-Chathaoirleach (deputy chairperson) of the house (1934–1936). "He was a keen debater, he was a hard-working and able legislator, if unforgiving of political opponents. On de Valera's accession to power, he expected to be made attorney general but was passed over in favour of Conor Maguire."

In 1931 he was re-elected for nine years. After the 1934 Seanad election, there was a contest on 12 December 1934 to decide who would be elected Cathaoirleach. Senator MacKean was absent for the vote but all other members were present. General Sir William Hickie chaired the election. The two candidates were the outgoing Cathaoirleach, Thomas Westropp Bennett, and the Fianna Fáil candidate, Comyn. Neither of the two candidates voted and so fifty-six Senators voted in the election, which resulted in a tie of twenty-eight votes each. Westropp Bennett received the votes of all twenty-one members of Fine Gael and seven independents. Comyn received the votes of his eighteen Fianna Fáil colleagues, all the votes of the seven Labour Party Senators and the votes of three independents: Sir Edward Bellingham, Thomas Linehan and Laurence O'Neill. Hickie then gave his casting vote for Westropp Bennett saying he would have done so had he had the opportunity in the division. The following week, however, Comyn defeated the outgoing Leas-Chathaoirleach, Michael F. O'Hanlon of Fine Gael, by twenty-six votes to twenty-five.

In 1932 he took a successful action against de Valera's government for the recovery of £20,000 of IRA fund.

On 24 February 1936, he resigned his seat in the Seanad as he had been appointed a judge on the Eastern Circuit Court. He died in 1952 aged 81 years.
