= Reid Professor of Criminal Law, Criminology and Penology =

Named chair at Trinity College Dublin

The Reid Professor of Criminal Law, Criminology and Penology is a professorship at Trinity College Dublin.

== Name and history ==
The chair is named after Richard Tuohill Reid (1823–83), an Irish lawyer and academic who was Perry Professor in Jurisprudence at Elphinstone College, a constituent college of the University of Bombay (now the University of Mumbai). Reid bequeathed £25,000 in trust to Irish education.

The chair was established initially in 1888 as Reid Professor of Penal Legislation, Constitutional and Criminal Law, and the Law of Evidence. This was amended to its current name by the High Court on 3 March 1975.

== Status ==
While nominally a chair, appointments are made on the lecturer (assistant professor) scale. The current holder is designated an adjunct assistant professor.

== Holders ==
=== Reid Professor of Penal Legislation, Constitutional and Criminal Law, and the Law of Evidence ===
- Frances Moran (1925–1930)
- Mary Robinson (1969–1975)

=== Reid Professor of Criminal Law, Criminology and Penology ===
- Mary McAleese (appointed in 1975, reappointed in 1981)
- Mark James Findlay (1979-1981)
- John Larkin (1989–1992)
- Ivana Bacik (1996, current holder)
