= Cathaoirleach =

Presiding officer of Seanad Éireann

Cathaoirleach of Seanad Éireann
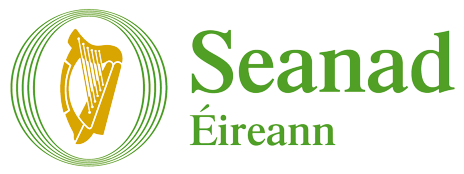

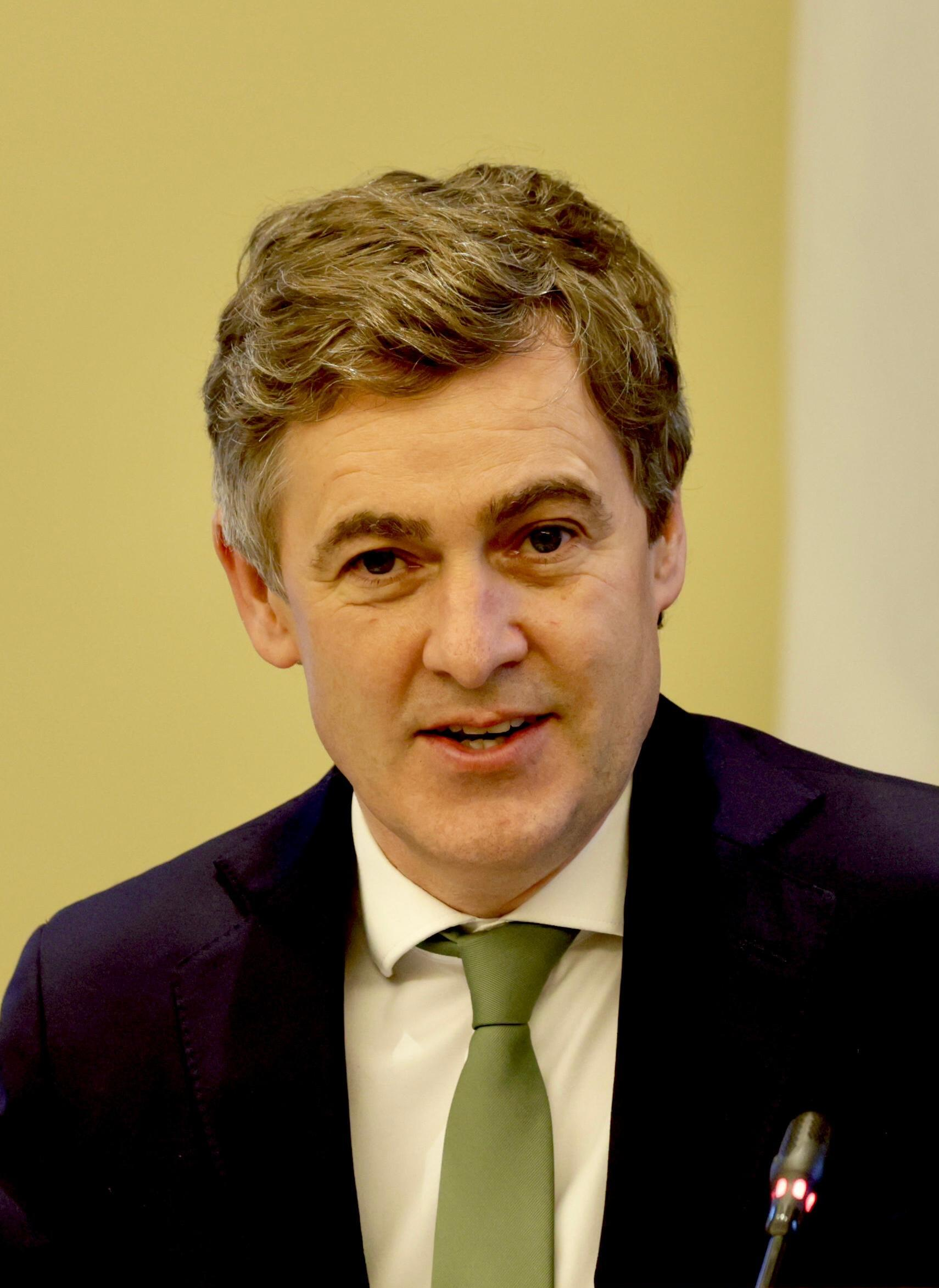
- Incumbent; Mark Daly since 12 February 2025
- Seanad Éireann
- Status: Presiding officer
- Member of: Seanad Éireann; Committee of Parliamentary Privileges and Oversight; Council of State; Presidential Commission
- Appointer: Elected by the members of Seanad Éireann
- Term length: No term limits
- Constituting instrument: Article 15 – Constitution of Ireland
- Inaugural holder: Lord Glenavy
- Formation: 6 December 1922
- Deputy: Leas-Chathaoirleach
- Salary: €138,210 annually (including €81,206 senator's salary)
- Website: Official website

The Cathaoirleach (/kəˈhɪərləx/; Irish for chairperson; plural: Cathaoirligh) is the chair (or presiding officer) of Seanad Éireann, the sixty-member upper house of the Oireachtas, the legislature of Ireland. The Cathaoirleach's deputy is the Leas-Chathaoirleach.

Mark Daly, a Fianna Fáil senator, has held the office of Cathaoirleach since 12 February 2025.

== Powers and functions ==
The Cathaoirleach is the sole judge of order, and has a range of powers and functions, namely:

- Calls on members to speak and all speeches must be addressed to the Chair.
- Puts such questions to the House as are required, supervises Divisions and declares the results.
- Has authority to suppress disorder, to enforce prompt obedience to Rulings and may order members to withdraw from the House or name them for suspension by the House itself for a period.
- In the case of great disorder can suspend or adjourn the House.

The Cathaoirleach is also an ex officio member of the Council of State, which advises the president of Ireland in the exercise of their discretionary powers, and of the Presidential Commission, which performs the powers and functions of the office of president in their absence.

== Seanad of the Irish Free State ==
The Seanad Éireann of the Irish Free State elected a new Cathaoirleach and Leas-Chathaoirleach after each triennial election. Its last sitting was held on 19 May 1936. The Seanad was abolished on 29 May 1936. The election for the new Seanad, set up in accordance with the 1937 Constitution of Ireland, was held on 28 March 1938, and its sitting was held on 27 April 1938.

== List of office-holders ==
=== Cathaoirleach ===
Seanad	Name (Birth–Death)	Portrait	Term of office		Party	Panel
1922	Lord Glenavy (1851–1931)		6 December 1922	6 December 1928	Independent	N/A
1925	Lord Glenavy (1851–1931)		6 December 1922	6 December 1928	Independent	N/A
1928	Thomas Westropp Bennett (1867–1962)		6 December 1928	19 May 1936	Cumann na nGaedheal	N/A
1931	Thomas Westropp Bennett (1867–1962)		6 December 1928	19 May 1936	Cumann na nGaedheal	N/A
1934	Thomas Westropp Bennett (1867–1962)		6 December 1928	19 May 1936	Fine Gael	N/A
2nd	Seán Gibbons (1883–1952)		27 April 1938	8 September 1943	Fianna Fáil	Agricultural Panel
3rd	Seán Gibbons (1883–1952)		27 April 1938	8 September 1943	Fianna Fáil	Agricultural Panel
4th	Seán Goulding (1877–1959)		8 September 1943	21 April 1948	Fianna Fáil	Industrial and Commercial Panel (1943–1944)
5th	Seán Goulding (1877–1959)		8 September 1943	21 April 1948	Fianna Fáil	Administrative Panel (1944–1948)
6th	Timothy O'Donovan (1881–1957)		21 April 1948	14 August 1951	Fine Gael	Agricultural Panel
7th	Liam Ó Buachalla (1899–1970)		14 August 1951	22 July 1954	Fianna Fáil	Cultural and Educational Panel
8th	Patrick Baxter (1891–1959)		22 July 1954	22 May 1957	Clann na Talmhan	Agricultural Panel
9th	Liam Ó Buachalla (1899–1970)		22 May 1957	5 November 1969	Fianna Fáil	Cultural and Educational Panel
10th	Liam Ó Buachalla (1899–1970)		22 May 1957	5 November 1969	Fianna Fáil	Cultural and Educational Panel
11th	Liam Ó Buachalla (1899–1970)		22 May 1957	5 November 1969	Fianna Fáil	Cultural and Educational Panel
12th	Michael Yeats (1921–2007)		5 November 1969	3 January 1973	Fianna Fáil	Cultural and Educational Panel
12th	Micheál Cranitch (1912–1999)		3 January 1973	1 June 1973	Fianna Fáil	Nominated by the Taoiseach
13th	James Dooge (1922–2010)		1 June 1973	27 October 1977	Fine Gael	Industrial and Commercial Panel
14th	Séamus Dolan (1914–2010)		27 October 1977	8 October 1981	Fianna Fáil	Labour Panel
15th	Charles McDonald (born 1935)		8 October 1981	13 May 1982	Fine Gael	Agricultural Panel
16th	Tras Honan (1930–2023)		13 May 1982	23 February 1983	Fianna Fáil	Administrative Panel
17th	Patrick J. Reynolds (1920–2003)		23 February 1983	25 April 1987	Fine Gael	Industrial and Commercial Panel
18th	Tras Honan (1930–2023)		25 April 1987	1 November 1989	Fianna Fáil	Administrative Panel
19th	Seán Doherty (1944–2005)		1 November 1989	23 January 1992	Fianna Fáil	Administrative Panel
19th	Seán Fallon (1937–1995)		23 January 1992	4 July 1995	Fianna Fáil	Industrial and Commercial Panel
20th	Seán Fallon (1937–1995)		23 January 1992	4 July 1995	Fianna Fáil	Industrial and Commercial Panel
20th	Liam Naughten (1944–1996)		12 July 1995	16 November 1996	Fine Gael	Agricultural Panel
20th	Liam T. Cosgrave (born 1956)		27 November 1996	17 September 1997	Fine Gael	Industrial and Commercial Panel
21st	Brian Mullooly (born 1935)		17 September 1997	12 September 2002	Fianna Fáil	Labour Panel
22nd	Rory Kiely (1934–2018)		12 September 2002	13 September 2007	Fianna Fáil	Agricultural Panel
23rd	Pat Moylan (born 1946)		13 September 2007	25 May 2011	Fianna Fáil	Agricultural Panel
24th	Paddy Burke (born 1955)		25 May 2011	8 June 2016	Fine Gael	Agricultural Panel
25th	Denis O'Donovan (born 1955)		8 June 2016	29 June 2020	Fianna Fáil	Agricultural Panel
26th	Mark Daly (born 1973)		29 June 2020	16 December 2022	Fianna Fáil	Administrative Panel
26th	Jerry Buttimer (born 1967)		16 December 2022	30 November 2024	Fine Gael	Labour Panel
27th	Mark Daly (born 1973)		12 February 2025	Incumbent	Fianna Fáil	Administrative Panel

=== Leas-Chathaoirleach ===
The Leas-Chathaoirleach is the deputy chair of the Seanad.

Seanad	Name (Birth–Death)	Portrait	Term of office		Party	Panel
1922	James G. Douglas (1887–1954)		12 December 1922	9 December 1925	Independent	N/A
1925	Thomas Westropp Bennett (1867–1962)		9 December 1925	12 December 1928	Cumann na nGaedheal	N/A
1928	Patrick W. Kenny (1863–1931)		12 December 1928	22 April 1931	Cumann na nGaedheal	N/A
1928	Patrick Hooper (1873–1931)		6 May 1931	6 September 1931	Independent	N/A
1931	Michael F. O'Hanlon (1890–1967)		20 January 1932	12 December 1934	Cumann na nGaedheal	N/A
1934	Michael Comyn (1871–1952)		12 December 1934	24 February 1936	Fianna Fáil	N/A
1934	David Robinson (1882–1943)		11 March 1936	19 May 1936	Fianna Fáil	N/A
2nd	Pádraic Ó Máille (1878–1946)		11 May 1938	30 November 1938	Fianna Fáil	Agricultural Panel
3rd	Michael Tierney (1894–1975)		30 November 1938	27 October 1943	Fine Gael	National University of Ireland
4th	Michael Tierney (1894–1975)		27 October 1943	18 August 1944	Fine Gael	National University of Ireland
5th	Timothy O'Donovan (1881–1957)		18 August 1944	21 April 1948	Fine Gael	Agricultural Panel
6th	Seán Goulding (1877–1959)		21 April 1948	14 August 1951	Fianna Fáil	Administrative Panel
7th	Timothy O'Donovan (1881–1957)		7 November 1951	27 July 1954	Fine Gael	Agricultural Panel
8th	Liam Ó Buachalla (1899–1970)		27 July 1954	29 May 1957	Fianna Fáil	Cultural and Educational Panel
9th	Patrick Baxter (1891–1959)		29 May 1957	3 April 1959	Clann na Talmhan	Agricultural Panel
9th	John O'Donovan (1908–1982)		30 May 1959	3 January 1962	Fine Gael	Cultural and Educational Panel
10th	Patrick Lindsay (1914–1993)		3 January 1962	30 June 1965	Fine Gael	Industrial and Commercial Panel
11th	James Dooge (1922–2010)		30 June 1965	12 November 1969	Fine Gael	Labour Panel
12th	James Dooge (1922–2010)		12 November 1969	20 June 1973	Fine Gael	Industrial and Commercial Panel
13th	Evelyn Owens (1931–2010)		20 June 1973	2 November 1977	Labour	Labour Panel
14th	Joe McCartin (born 1939)		2 November 1977	12 July 1979	Fine Gael	Agricultural Panel
14th	Charles McDonald (born 1935)		18 July 1979	13 May 1982	Fine Gael	Agricultural Panel
15th	Séamus Dolan (1914–2010)		9 October 1981	19 May 1982	Fianna Fáil	Labour Panel
16th	Charles McDonald (born 1935)		19 May 1982	9 March 1983	Fine Gael	Agricultural Panel
17th	Tras Honan (1930–2023)		9 March 1983	25 April 1987	Fianna Fáil	Administrative Panel
18th	Charles McDonald (born 1935)		20 May 1987	8 November 1989	Fine Gael	Agricultural Panel
19th	Liam Naughten (1944–1996)		8 November 1989	25 February 1993	Fine Gael	Agricultural Panel
20th	Liam Naughten (1944–1996)		25 February 1993	12 July 1995	Fine Gael	Agricultural Panel
20th	Brian Mullooly (born 1935)		19 July 1995	18 September 1997	Fianna Fáil	Labour Panel
21st	Liam T. Cosgrave (born 1956)		18 September 1997	13 September 2002	Fine Gael	Industrial and Commercial Panel
22nd	Paddy Burke (born 1955)		13 September 2002	13 September 2007	Fine Gael	Agricultural Panel
23rd	Paddy Burke (born 1955)		13 September 2007	25 May 2011	Fine Gael	Agricultural Panel
24th	Denis O'Donovan (born 1955)		25 May 2011	8 June 2016	Fianna Fáil	Industrial and Commercial Panel
25th	Paul Coghlan (1944–2023)		15 June 2016	27 March 2020	Fine Gael	Industrial and Commercial Panel
26th	Jerry Buttimer (born 1967)		7 July 2020	21 August 2020	Fine Gael	Labour Panel
26th	Joe O'Reilly (born 1955)		22 August 2020	16 December 2022	Fine Gael	Labour Panel
26th	Mark Daly (born 1973)		16 December 2022	12 February 2025	Fianna Fáil	Administrative Panel
27th	Maria Byrne		19 February 2025	Incumbent	Fine Gael	Agricultural Panel

== See also ==
- Ceann Comhairle (Chairperson of Dáil Éireann)
- Leader of the Seanad
