= Maurice George Moore =

Irish politician and soldier (1854–1939)

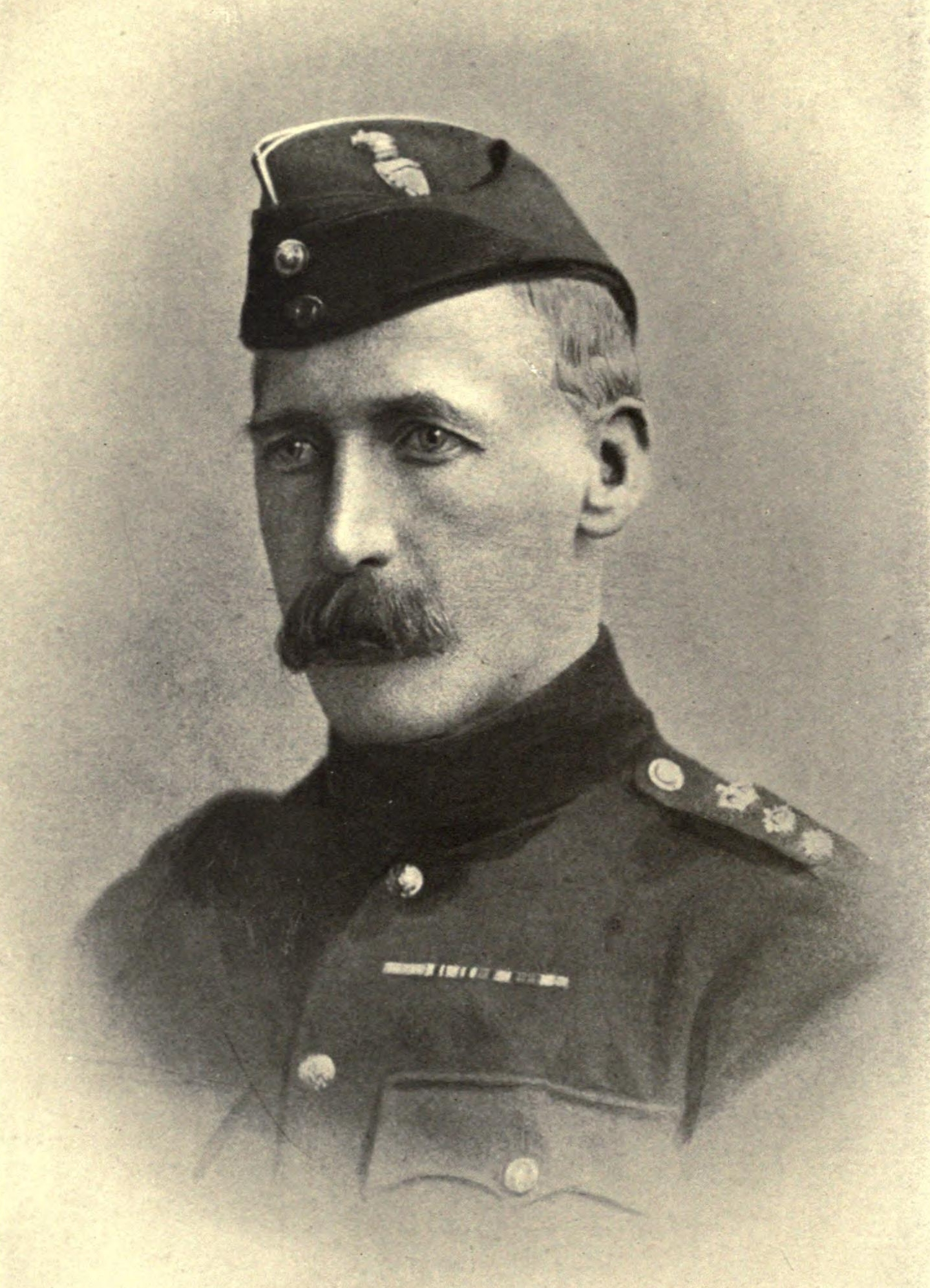
- Moore, c. 1913

Senator
- In office 27 April 1938 – 8 September 1939
- Constituency: Nominated by the Taoiseach

Senator
- In office 11 December 1922 – 29 May 1936

Personal details
- Born: 10 August 1854 Moore Hall, County Mayo
- Died: 8 September 1939 (aged 85) Dublin, Ireland
- Party: Fianna Fáil; Independent
- Spouse: Evelyn Handcock (m. 1889)
- Children: 2
- Parent: George Henry Moore (father)
- Relatives: George A. Moore (brother); John Moore (grand-uncle)
- Education: Royal Military Academy Sandhurst
- Occupation: Author, politician, soldier
- Awards: Companion of the Order of the Bath
- Military career
- Allegiance: United Kingdom; Irish Republic
- Service: British Army; Irish Volunteers; National Volunteers
- Service years: 1874–1906 (British Army); 1913–1914 (Irish Volunteers); 1914–1916 (National Volunteers)
- Rank: Lieutenant colonel (British Army); Colonel (Irish Volunteers)
- Unit: Connaught Rangers (British Army)
- Commands: Inspector General, Irish Volunteers; Inspector General, National Volunteers
- Conflicts: Xhosa Wars; Anglo-Zulu War; Second Boer War

Maurice George Moore, CB (10 August 1854 – 8 September 1939) was an Irish author, soldier and politician.

== Early life ==
Moore was the second of four sons born to George Henry Moore of Moore Hall, County Mayo, and Mary Blake of Ballinafad, County Galway. His father was an MP for Mayo. His elder brother was the writer, George A. Moore. He was born at Moore Hall, and was educated in Mayo and at Royal Military College, Sandhurst where he trained as an officer.

== Military service ==
Moore joined the British army as a lieutenant in the Connaught Rangers on 13 June 1874. He saw action in the Xhosa Wars in the late 1870s and the Anglo-Zulu War in 1879, was promoted to captain on 1 November 1882, and major 8 February 1893.

During the Second Boer War he was present at the battles of Ladysmith (October 1899), Colenso (December 1899), Spion Kop (January 1900) and Vaal Krantz (February 1900). He was highly regarded and decorated.

For his service in the war he was promoted a brevet lieutenant colonel on 29 November 1900, and was appointed a Companion of the Order of the Bath (CB) in the South Africa honours list published on 26 June 1902.

Following the end of the war in June 1902, he left Cape Town on the SS Canada and returned to Southampton in late July. He was appointed in command of the 1st Battalion of his regiment with the substantive rank of lieutenant colonel on 16 July 1902, and later in 1902 received the rank of brevet colonel.

== Nationalist activities ==
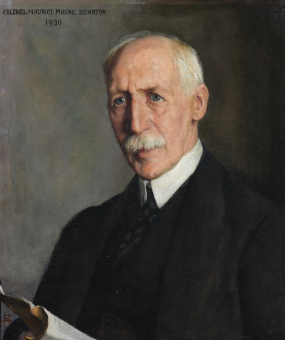
Portrait by Sarah Cecilia Harrison, 1930

However, his horror at the creation of concentration camps in South Africa and ill-treatment of Boer civilians by the British military led to him writing anonymous articles which were published in the Freeman's Journal, which brought attention to the matters. He retired from the British Army on 16 July 1906. Moore was a fluent Irish language speaker and had spoken it with fellow members of the Connaught Rangers Regiment. He was a supporter of the Gaelic League.

In 1903 he started evening schools in County Mayo, teaching the language and Irish history, supporting the 1909 introduction of Irish as a compulsory subject for the National University of Ireland. He was heavily involved in rural development and was an early supporter of the Irish co-operative movement.

A member of the provisional committee of the Irish Volunteers in 1913, he was made the organisation's Inspector General, spending much of 1914 organising the troops in Ireland. He was a very reluctant supporter of John Redmond's takeover of the Volunteers and was ultimately the leader of the National Volunteers after the Volunteer split.

Moore finally broke with Redmond in 1916 after the Easter Rising. In that year he collected a petition with Agnes O'Farrelly asking for a reprieve of the death sentence against Roger Casement. From 1917 on, he was a member of Sinn Féin, which led to his Dublin home being raided a number of times by the authorities during the Irish War of Independence. In 1920 he was appointed as Irish envoy to the Union of South Africa.

His most important role as a diplomat was to persuade the South African Prime Minister General Smuts to support Irish independence, but he also understood that Smuts did not have the power to recognise the Irish Republic. As a result, when Smuts was in London for the 1921 Imperial Conference, he detoured to Dublin, met Éamon de Valera, and assisted both sides in brokering the Truce of July 1921 that ended the Irish War of Independence.

== Political career ==
Dublin Castle Special Branch intelligence file on Colonel Maurice Moore

In 1922 he was made a member of the Irish Free State Seanad by W. T. Cosgrave. As a result of the Irish Civil War members of the Anti-Treaty IRA were attacking property belonging to senators. On 1 February 1923 Moore Hall, his ancestral home, and the property of his brother George, was totally destroyed. Moore and Jennie Wyse Power were the only two senators to oppose the election of Lord Glenavy as Cathaoirleach as he had been a former prominent Unionist.

He and Wyse Power would both become increasingly vocal in opposition to Cumann na nGaedheal governmental policies. He was a vocal critic of the Boundary Agreement which was made between Ireland and the United Kingdom in 1925 and this persuaded him to join Clann Éireann which had been founded by Professor William Magennis. When the Ultimate Financial Settlement was signed he proposed a motion that it was prejudicial in the interests in the country. He famously said: "We have been burgled and we have bribed the burglar."

In 1928 six Fianna Fáil candidates were elected to the Seanad under the leadership of Joseph Connolly and Moore immediately joined the party (Clann Éireann had already folded and encouraged its members to join Fianna Fáil). He was nominated as a candidate for Leas-Chathaoirleach (vice-chairman) of the Seanad in 1928 but was defeated by Senator Patrick W. Kenny of Cumann na nGaedheal by twenty-seven votes to twenty-one. He was re-elected as a Fianna Fáil Senator at the 1931 Seanad Election for nine years and served until the abolition of the Seanad. He was again nominated for Leas-Chathaoirleach that year but again defeated. Moore would ultimately vote against the bill to which called for the abolition of the Seanad, though remained a member of the party.

After the passage of Constitution of Ireland in 1937, Moore was nominated by the Taoiseach Éamon de Valera as one of his eleven nominees to the new Seanad. He remained a senator there until his death in Dublin in 1939, aged 85.

== Family ==
He married Evelyn Handcock, daughter of John Stradford Handcock of Dunmore, County Galway in 1889, and they had two sons, Maurice and Ulick. His son, Ulick Moore, served with the Sixth Battalion, Connaught Rangers during World War I, and was killed in action at Sainte-Emilie on 22 March 1918. Maurice Moore wrote a biography about his father entitled An Irish Gentleman, George Henry Moore: His Travel, his Racing, his Politics which was published in 1913, with a preface by his writer brother George.

== Sources ==
- Joseph Hone, The Moores of Moore Hall, Jonathan Cape, 1939
