= Nugent Everard =

Irish politician (1849–1929)

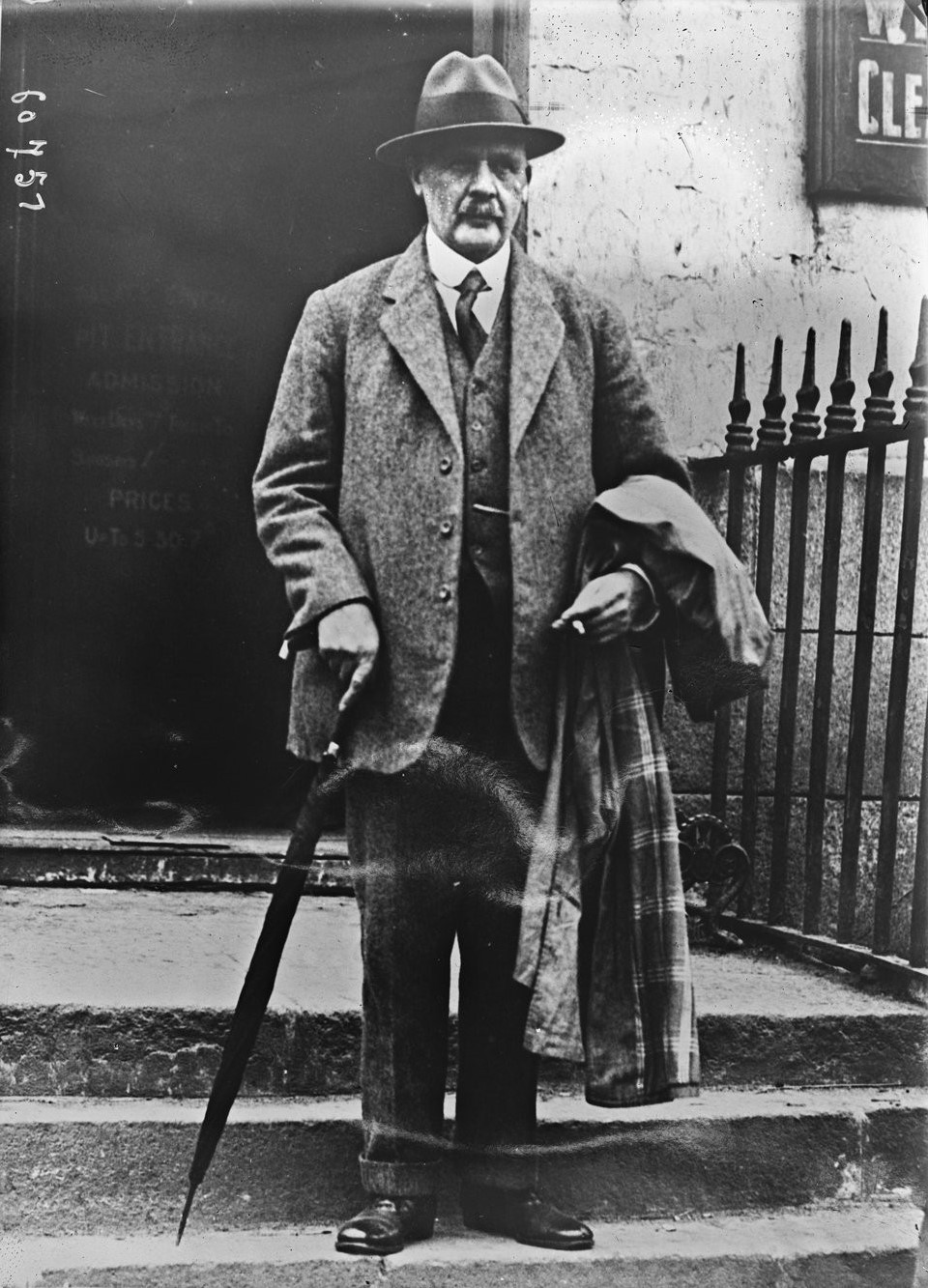
- Everard in 1920

Seanad Éireann
- In office 10 April 1929 – 12 July 1929
- In office 11 December 1922 – 12 December 1928

Personal details
- Born: 24 October 1849 Torquay, Devonshire, England
- Died: 12 July 1929 (aged 79) County Meath, Ireland
- Party: Independent
- Spouse: Sylvia Humphrys (m. 1873)
- Children: 1
- Education: Trinity College, Cambridge

Military service
- Branch/service: British Army
- Rank: Colonel
- Unit: Prince of Wales's Leinster Regiment (Royal Canadians)

Sir Nugent Talbot Everard, 1st Baronet (24 October 1849 – 12 July 1929) was an Irish senator nominated to the 1922 Seanad Éireann.

He was born 24 October 1849 in Torquay, Devonshire, England, the eldest son of Captain Richard Nugent Everard, officer in the British army, and his wife Barbara Everard (née O'Reilly) of Ballinlough Castle, County Westmeath. He was educated at Harrow School and Trinity College, Cambridge (MA 1875). In 1863, at the age of 13, he had inherited the family estate in Ireland at Randlestown, near Navan, County Meath. About 1870 he settled at Randlestown. He took up farming on the estate, at that time containing 2,311 acres.

In the 1892 general election he stood as Unionist candidate in West Cavan, but was not elected. In 1902 he was one of the landlord representatives during the Land Conference.

He was commissioned as a supernumerary Lieutenant in the part-time Royal Meath Militia (later the 5th Battalion, Prince of Wales's Leinster Regiment (Royal Canadians)) on 13 February 1871, and rose to be Lieutenant-Colonel in command of the battalion on 23 November 1901, being granted the honorary rank of Colonel on 2 August 1902. He was also High Sheriff of Meath (for 1883) and Lord Lieutenant of Meath. He was a member of Meath County Council from 1900 to 1920.

In recognition of his involvement in public life, he was created a baronet on 30 June 1911, on the occasion of the coronation of George V. In 1917 and 1918 he was a participant in the Irish Convention, and in 1920 he took part in peace negotiations in Dublin. In 1921 his efforts for the benefit of the public cause were recognised again when he was appointed by the lord lieutenant as a member of the newly created Senate of Southern Ireland. At the formal opening of the short-lived Southern Irish parliament he presided in the absence of the lord chancellor, Sir John Ross.

In 1922, Everard was nominated by the President of the Executive Council and sat as an independent member. He was defeated at the 1928 Seanad election but was re-elected at a by-election on 10 April 1929 to fill the vacancy caused by the death of William Sears. He died in office in July 1929. The by-election for his seat was won by Richard A. Butler.

== Arms ==
Coat of arms of Nugent Everard
Crest A pelican in her piety Proper Escutcheon Argent a fess wavy between three estoiles Gules Motto Virtus in Actione Consistit

Honorary titles
Preceded by Simon Mangan	Lord Lieutenant of Meath; 1906–1922	Office abolished
Baronetage of the United Kingdom
New creation	Baronet (of Randlestown, Meath); 1911–1929	Succeeded by Richard William Everard
