= Daniel MacParland =

Irish politician

Senator
- In office 9 December 1931 – 29 May 1936

Personal details
- Party: Fianna Fáil

Daniel Henry MacParland (died 24 August 1944) was an Irish politician. He was a Fianna Fáil member of the Free State Seanad Éireann from 1931 to 1936. He was elected to the Seanad in 1931 for 9 years and served until the Free State Seanad was abolished in 1936.
