= Arthur Vincent (politician) =

Irish politician, barrister and judge (1876–1956)

Senator
- In office 28 May 1931 – 21 February 1934

Personal details
- Born: Arthur Rose Vincent; 9 June 1876 Mhow, (now Madhya Pradesh), British India
- Died: 24 September 1956 (aged 80) Monaco City, Monaco
- Resting place: Killegy Cemetery, Muckross Estate, Killarney, County Kerry, Ireland
- Party: Independent
- Spouses: Maud Bowers Bourn (m. 1910; died 1929); Dorothy Hughes (m. 1933)
- Children: 2
- Relatives: William Bowers Bourn II (father-in-law)
- Education: Collège de France; Trinity College, Dublin; King's Inns

Arthur Rose Vincent CBE (9 June 1876 – 24 September 1956) was an Irish politician and barrister who served as a Senator from 1931 to 1934. He also served as a judge of various British colonial and extraterritorial courts. He donated Muckross House and its estate to the Irish state with his parents-in-law.

== Early life ==
Vincent was born in Mhow, British India, to an Anglo-Irish family based in Summerhill House in Clonlara, County Clare. His parents were Colonel Arthur Hare Vincent, commander of the 3rd The King's Own Hussars and Elizabeth Davidson-Manson. Vincent was educated at Wellington College, Berkshire, Collège de France, Paris and at Trinity College, Dublin. He graduated with a Bachelor of Laws and qualified as Barrister with King's Inns, Dublin.

== Judicial career ==
In 1903, Vincent joined the Foreign Office Judicial service. In that year, he was appointed Magistrate in Kisumu, British East Africa. In 1905, he appointed Second Assistant Judge in Zanzibar. With effect from April 1906, he was appointed Assistant Judge for the British Court for Siam in Bangkok. In 1908, he was appointed Acting Assistant Judge of the British Supreme Court for China in Shanghai while the Judge of the Court Havilland de Sausmarez was on sick leave. He served in that position for one year. He met his future wife travelling from Shanghai to San Francisco. He returned to Zanzibar as Acting Assistant Judge briefly from October 1909 to January 1910, when he resigned from Foreign Office service.

== Later life ==
He served as High Sheriff of Kerry in 1915 and as a justice of the peace.

In 1919, Vincent, who was then serving as the Chicago Representative of the Ministry of Information, was appointed a Commander of the Order of the British Empire.

Vincent was an independent member of Seanad Éireann from 1931 to 1934. He was elected at a by-election on 28 May 1931 taking the seat vacated by the death of Senator Patrick W. Kenny. He was re-elected in 1931 for 9 years. He resigned on 21 February 1934 due to reasons of ill-health. Patrick Lynch was elected at a by-election to replace him.

In 1932, finding the management and expense of the Muckross estate too complex and too expensive, Vincent and his parents-in-law Mr and Mrs William Bowers Bourn donated Muckross House and its 11,000 acres estate to the Irish state as a memorial to Maud Bourn Vincent. It now forms part of Killarney National Park. In 1937, he left Ireland for Monaco, where he lived for most of the rest of his life. Only during World War II did he come back to Ireland. He is buried in the Killegy graveyard near Muckross House.

== Personal life ==
Vincent married Maud Bowers Bourn, the daughter of William Bowers Bourn in 1910. They had two children, Elizabeth Bourn and Arthur William Bourn. Maud died from pneumonia in 1929. Vincent married Dorothy Hughes (née Croutear) in 1933.
