= Patrick W. Kenny =

Irish politician (1863–1931)

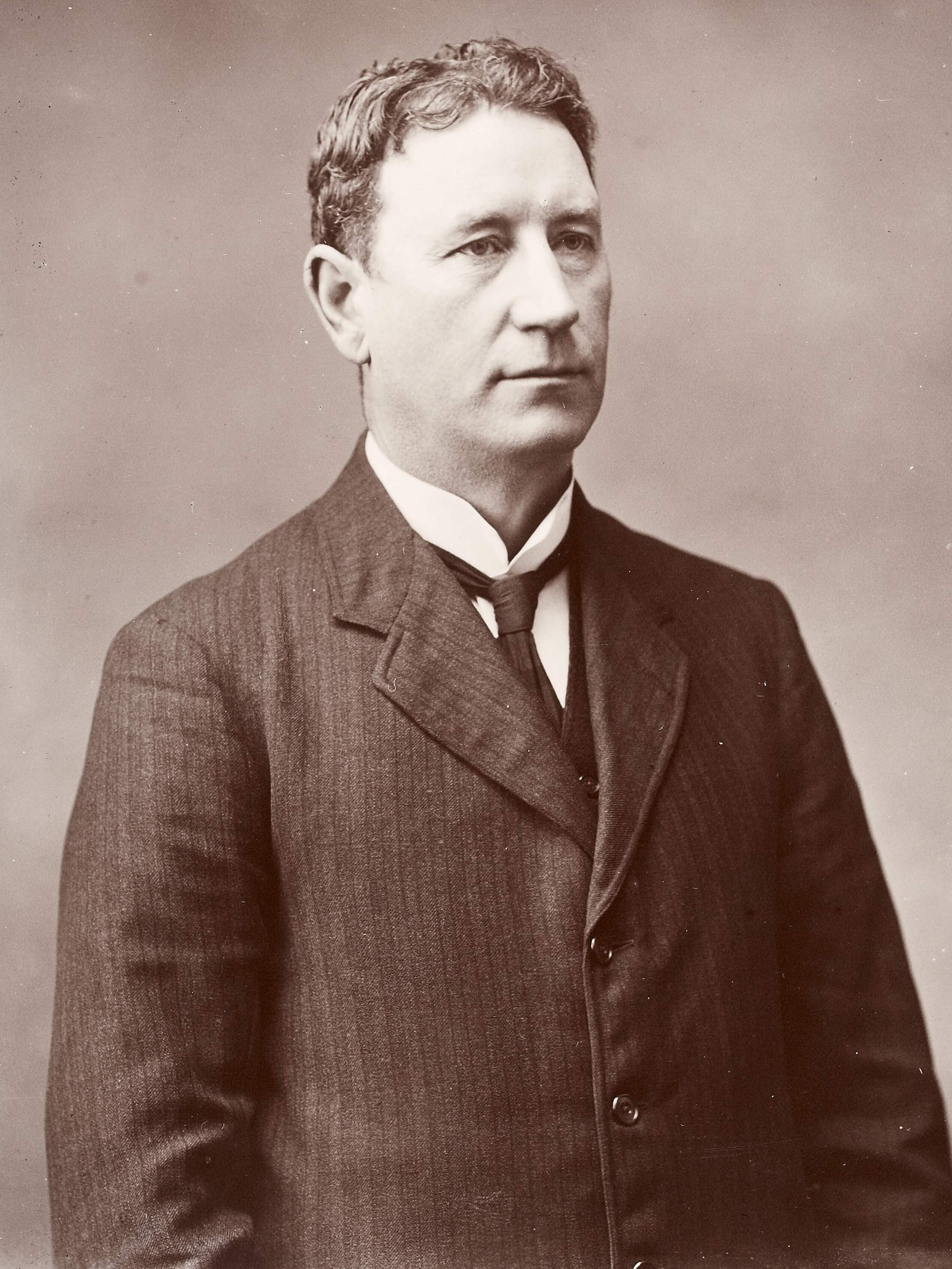
- Kenny, c. 1927

Leas-Chathaoirleach of Seanad Éireann
- In office 12 December 1928 – 22 April 1931
- Preceded by: Thomas Westropp Bennett
- Succeeded by: Patrick Hooper

Senator
- In office 11 December 1922 – 22 April 1931

Personal details
- Born: 1863 County Waterford, Ireland
- Died: 22 April 1931 (aged 67–68)
- Party: Cumann na nGaedheal

Patrick W. Kenny (1863 – 22 April 1931) was an Irish politician. He was a Cumann na nGaedheal member of Seanad Éireann from 1922 to 1931. He was elected to Free State Seanad in 1922 for nine years and served until his death in office on 22 April 1931. He was elected Leas-Chathaoirleach (deputy chairperson) of the Seanad on 12 December 1928., a position he held until his death.

== Political career ==
Kenny was elected to the Free State Seanad in 1922 for a nine-year term, representing Cumann na nGaedheal, the political party that supported the Anglo-Irish Treaty. His election as Leas-Chathaoirleach in 1928 underscored his leadership and influence within the Seanad.

== Personal life ==
Born in county Waterford, Ireland in 1863, Kenny dedicated much of his life to public service. He died at the age of 67/68, leaving behind a legacy of commitment to Irish politics during a transformative period in the nation's history.
