= Patrick Hooper =

Irish politician, barrister and journalist (1873–1931)

Senator
- In office 23 March 1927 – 6 September 1931

Personal details
- Born: 1 June 1873 Cork, Ireland
- Died: 6 September 1931 (aged 58) Dublin, Ireland
- Party: Independent
- Spouse: Margaret Ryan (m. 1904)
- Children: 3
- Parent: John Hooper (father)
- Relatives: Willie Hooper (brother)

Patrick Joseph Hooper (1 June 1873 – 6 September 1931) was an Irish politician, barrister and journalist.

He was born in Cork in 1873, the son of John Hooper, who was also a politician and journalist. In 1915 was called to the English and Welsh bar by Gray's Inn. Hooper was the last editor of the Freeman's Journal. Imprisoned for a month in 1920 along with Fitzgerald and Edwards, for publishing an article about British Army/Black and Tans brutality.

He was an independent member of Seanad Éireann from 1927 to 1931. He was elected at a by-election on 23 March 1927 taking the seat vacated by the death of Martin Fitzgerald, a former proprietor of the Freeman's Journal. He was Leas-Chathaoirleach of the Seanad from 6 May 1931 until his death in September 1931. George Crosbie was elected at a by-election to replace him.
