= Martin Fitzgerald (politician) =

Irish politician (1867–1927)

Senator
- In office 11 December 1922 – 9 March 1927

Personal details
- Born: 9 November 1865 County Mayo, Ireland
- Died: 9 March 1927 (aged 61) Dublin, Ireland
- Party: Independent
- Spouse: Mary Fogarty (m. 1904)
- Children: 6

Martin Thomas Fitzgerald (9 November 1865 – 9 March 1927) was an Irish politician.

Born on Main Street, Charlestown, County Mayo, he moved to Dublin at an early age. He was an independent member of Seanad Éireann from 1922 to 1927. He was nominated to the Seanad by the President of the Executive Council in 1922 for 12 years. He died in office in 1927.

He was the last owner of the Freeman's Journal.
