= Richard A. Butler (Irish politician) =

Irish politician (1874–1952)

Senator
- In office 23 October 1929 – 9 December 1931
- In office 11 December 1922 – 17 September 1925

Personal details
- Born: 2 December 1874 Dublin, Ireland
- Died: 2 May 1952 (aged 77) Dublin, Ireland
- Party: Independent

Richard Andrew Butler (2 December 1874 – 2 May 1952) was an Irish politician. He was an independent member of Seanad Éireann from 1922 to 1925 and from 1929 to 1931. He was first elected at the 1922 Seanad election and lost his seat at the 1925 Seanad election. He was re-elected to Seanad at a by-election on 23 October 1929, replacing Sir Nugent Everard. He was defeated at the 1931 Seanad election.

Butler was born in Dublin. A prominent local farmer and council member of the Royal Dublin Society he lived at Popeshall, Loughshinny near Skerries, County Dublin. He died in the Mater Hospital, Dublin on 2 May 1952.
