= James Moran (Irish politician) =

Irish businessman and politician (1857–1938)

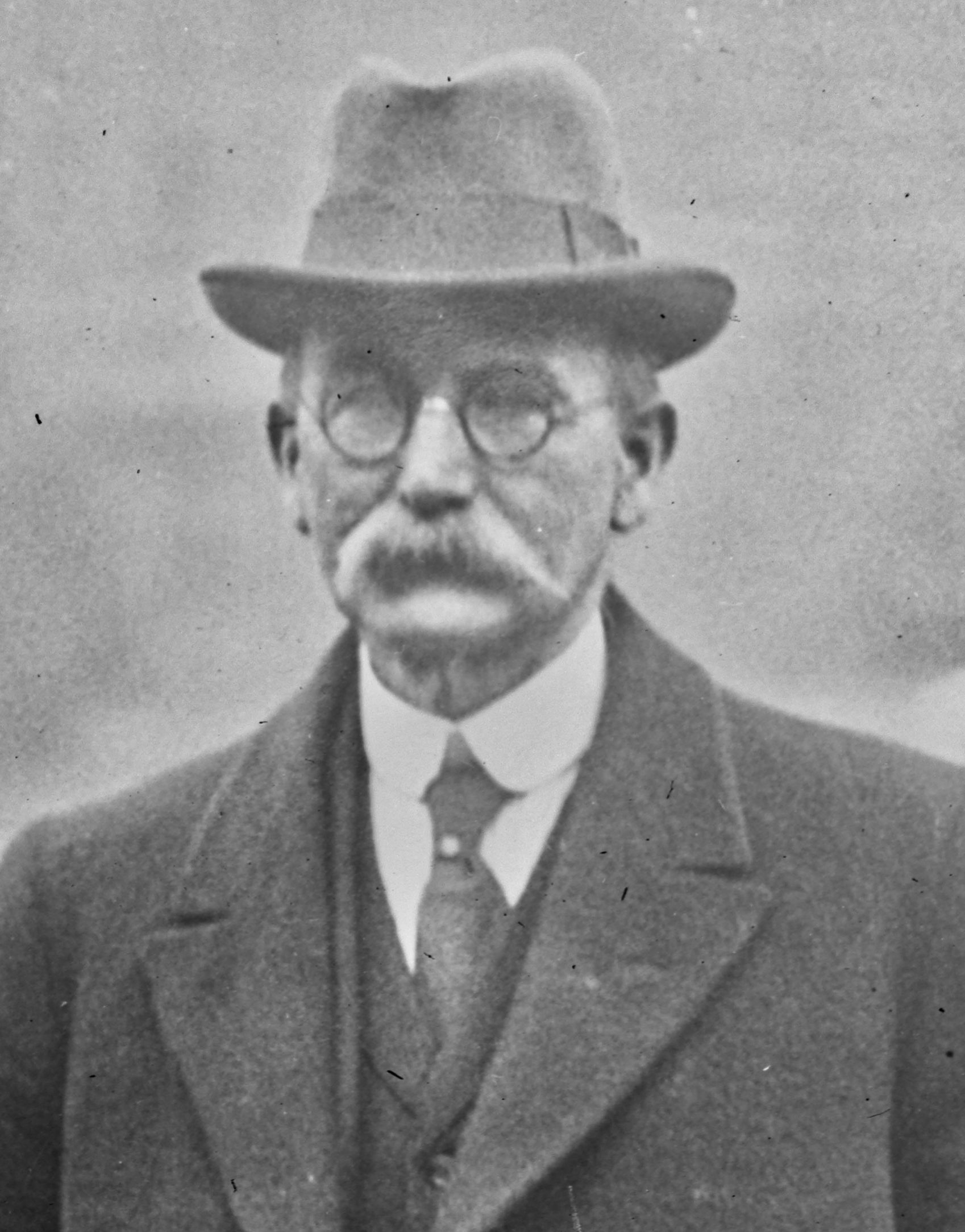
- Moran in 1922

Senator
- In office 11 December 1922 – 12 December 1934

Personal details
- Born: 1857 County Wicklow, Ireland
- Died: 7 October 1938 (aged 80–81)
- Party: Independent

James Moran (1857 – 7 October 1938) was an Irish politician. He was an independent member of Seanad Éireann from 1922 to 1934. A company director and hotelier, he was nominated to the Seanad by the President of the Executive Council in 1922 for 12 years. He lost his seat at the 1934 Seanad election.

His second daughter, Frances Moran, became a leading barrister and Regius Professorship of Laws at Trinity College Dublin.
