= Seán MacEllin =

Irish politician (died 1969)

Senator
- In office 18 August 1944 – 21 April 1948
- In office 7 September 1938 – 8 September 1943
- Constituency: Industrial and Commercial Panel

Senator
- In office 12 December 1928 – 29 May 1936

Personal details
- Died: 1 September 1969
- Political party: Fianna Fáil

Seán MacEllin (died 1 September 1969) was an Irish Fianna Fáil politician. He was a member of Seanad Éireann from 1928 to 1936, 1938 to 1943 and 1944 to 1948. He was first elected to the Free State Seanad in 1928 for 3 years.

He was re-elected for a 9-year term at the 1931 Seanad election and served until the Free State Seanad was abolished in 1936. At the 1938 election, he was elected by the Industrial and Commercial Panel. He lost his seat at the 1943 election, but regained it at the 1944 election. He did not contest the 1948 Seanad election.
