= John Griffith (engineer) =

Irish engineer and politician (1848–1938)

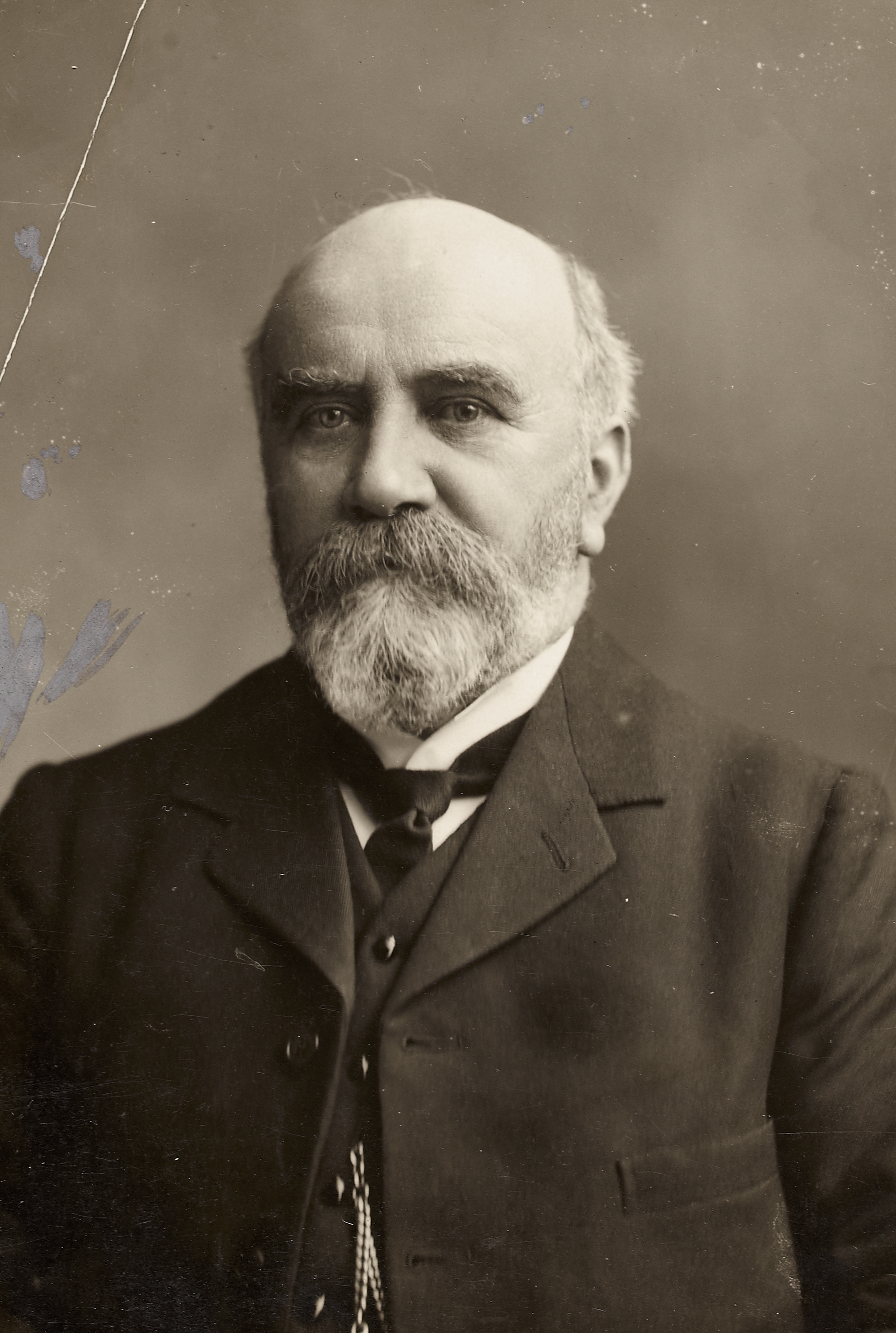
- Griffith, c. 1900s

Senator
- In office 11 December 1922 – 29 May 1936

Personal details
- Born: 5 October 1848 Holyhead, Wales
- Died: 21 October 1938 (aged 90) Dublin, Ireland
- Party: Independent
- Spouse: Anna (Nina) Purser
- Children: 3
- Education: Trinity College Dublin
- Occupation: Civil Engineer

Sir John Purser Griffith (5 October 1848 – 21 October 1938) was a Welsh-born Irish civil engineer and politician.

Griffith was educated at Trinity College Dublin and gained a licence in civil engineering in 1868. He served a two-year apprenticeship under Dr Bindon Blood Stoney, the Engineer in Chief of the Dublin Port and Docks, before working as assistant to the county surveyor of County Antrim. He returned to Dublin in 1871 and worked as Dr. Stoney's assistant, becoming the Chief Engineer in 1898 before retiring in 1913.

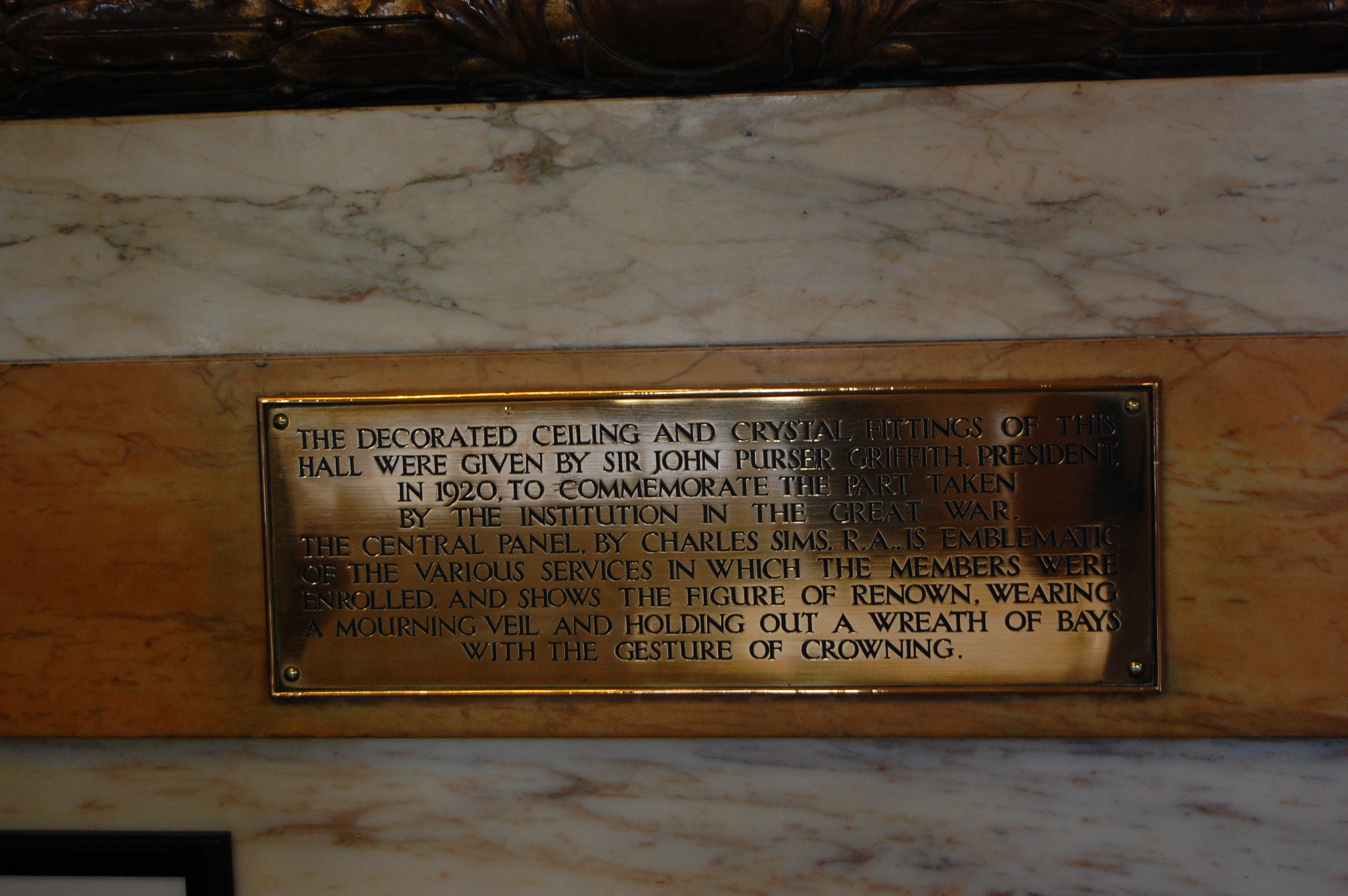
Plaque commemorating Griffith's gift of a ceiling mural at One Great George Street in recognition of the contribution of its members during the First World War

He served as president of the Institution of Civil Engineers in Ireland between 1887 and 1889 and of the Institution of Civil Engineers between 1919 and 1920. He was elected Commissioner of Irish Lights in 1913 and was a member of the Royal Commission on Canals and Waterways between 1906 and 1911.

Griffith purchased and drained the bogland at Pollagh, part of the Bog of Allen, a peat fuelled power station was built which drove an excavator, excess peat being taken by the Grand Canal for sale in Dublin. The site was sold to the Turf Development Board in 1936 who used it as a basis for all of their later peat fuelled power stations, the area is now a nature reserve.

Griffith received a knighthood in 1911 and became vice-president of the Royal Dublin Society in 1922. He served as an Honorary Professor of Harbour Engineering at Trinity College, his alma mater, and received an honorary M.A.I. degree from the University of Dublin in 1914. From 1922 he was an elected member of the Seanad Éireann until its abolition in 1936. In the 1930s he and his niece Sarah Purser, endowed the Purser Griffith Travelling Scholarship and the Purser Griffith Prize to the two best-performing students in European Art History at University College Dublin.

He died at Rathmines Castle in Dublin on 21 October 1938.

Professional and academic associations
Preceded by John Aspinall	President of the Institution of Civil Engineers; November 1919 – November 1920	Succeeded by John Alexander Brodie
