= Thomas Toal =

Irish politician (1862–1946)

Senator
- In office 17 September 1925 – 29 May 1936

Personal details
- Born: 1862 County Monaghan, Ireland
- Died: 24 January 1946 (aged 83–84) County Monaghan, Ireland
- Party: Cumann na nGaedheal; Fine Gael

Thomas Toal (1862 – 24 January 1946) was an Irish politician. He was a Cumann na nGaedheal member of Seanad Éireann from 1925 to 1936. He was elected at the 1925 Seanad election for 12 years and served until the Free State Seanad was abolished in 1936.

A native of County Monaghan, Toal was chairman of Monaghan County Council for over forty years up to 1942. He died at his home at Magherarney House, Smithborough, on 24 January 1946.
