= William O'Sullivan (politician) =

Irish politician and medical doctor (1873–1953)

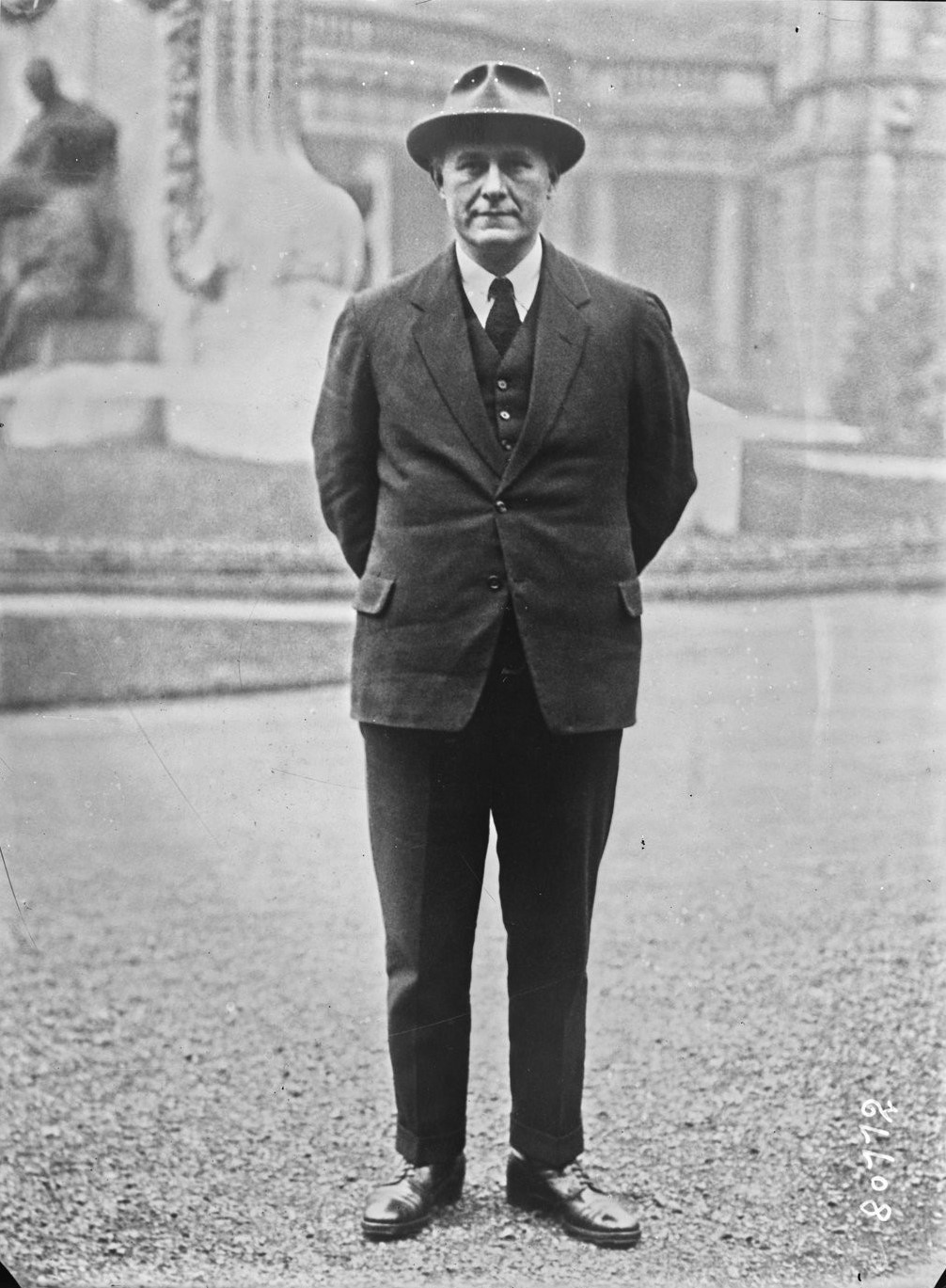
- O'Sullivan in 1922

Senator
- In office 11 December 1922 – 29 May 1936

Personal details
- Born: 1873 County Kerry, Ireland
- Died: 3 March 1953 (aged 79) Killarney, County Kerry, Ireland
- Party: Cumann na nGaedheal; Fine Gael
- Education: University College Cork; Royal College of Surgeons of Edinburgh

William O'Sullivan (1873 – 3 March 1953) was an Irish politician and medical doctor. He was a Cumann na nGaedheal member of Seanad Éireann from 1922 to 1936. He was first elected to the Seanad in 1922 for 9 years and was re-elected in 1931 for 6 years. He served until the Free State Seanad was abolished in 1936.

He was born in County Kerry and qualified as a doctor in 1898. He was educated at St Brendan's College, Killarney, University College Cork and the Royal College of Surgeons of Edinburgh.

He practised for many years in Killarney where he was Medical officer of health and county coroner for East Kerry. He died at his home, Inch House, Killarney, on 3 March 1953, aged 79. A noted sportsman himself he was the father of Billy O'Sullivan, an international Irish golfer and golf administrator.
