= Cornelius Kennedy =

Irish politician (died 1951)

Senator
- In office 27 April 1938 – 7 September 1938
- Constituency: Industrial and Commercial Panel

Senator
- In office 17 September 1925 – 29 May 1936

Personal details
- Born: County Wicklow, Ireland
- Died: 4 April 1951
- Party: Cumann na nGaedheal

Cornelius Kennedy (died 4 April 1951) was an Irish politician. He was a Cumann na nGaedheal member of the Free State Seanad Éireann from 1925 to 1936. A grocer and vintner from County Wicklow, he was elected at the 1925 Seanad election for 12 years, and served until the Free State Seanad was abolished in 1936.

He was elected to the 2nd Seanad Éireann as a Fine Gael member in April 1938 by the Industrial and Commercial Panel. He was defeated at the Seanad election in August 1938.
