= John Counihan =

Irish politician (1879–1953

Senator
- In office 7 September 1938 – 14 August 1951
- Constituency: Agricultural Panel

Senator
- In office 11 December 1922 – 29 May 1936

Personal details
- Born: 1879; County Kerry, Ireland
- Died: 30 October 1953 (aged 73–74)
- Political party: Independent; Fine Gael; Cumann na nGaedheal

John Joseph Counihan (1879 – 30 October 1953) was an Irish politician. He was a member of the Free State Seanad from 1922 to 1936, and of Seanad Éireann from 1938 to 1951. He was first elected to the Seanad in 1922. He did not serve in the 2nd Seanad. From 1938 onwards, he was elected by the Agricultural Panel. He was variously an independent, Cumann na nGaedheal and Fine Gael member of the Seanad.
