= James J. MacKean =

Irish politician (c.1864–1936)

Senator
- In office 11 December 1922 – 29 May 1936

Personal details
- Born: 15 July 1864 Castleblayney, County Monaghan, Ireland
- Died: 19 September 1936 (aged 72) Dublin, Ireland
- Party: Cumann na nGaedheal; Fine Gael
- Relatives: John McKean (brother)

James Joseph MacKean (15 July 1864 – 19 September 1936) was an Irish politician. He was a Cumann na nGaedheal member of the Free State Seanad Éireann from 1922 to 1936. He was first elected to the Seanad in 1922 for 9 years and was re-elected in 1931 for 9 years. He served until the Free State Seanad was abolished in 1936.

He was the son of Patrick MacKean (also Mickan), a shoemaker, and Mary Hanratty.

His brother John McKean was an MP for South Monaghan from 1902 to 1918.
