= James Dillon (senator) =

Irish politician and farmer (died 1955)

Senator
- In office 17 September 1925 – 29 May 1936

Personal details
- Died: 5 November 1955
- Party: Farmers' Party; Cumann na nGaedheal; Fine Gael

James Dillon (died 5 November 1955) was an Irish politician and farmer who served for thirteen years in the Seanad of the Irish Free State.

He was elected for twelve years at the 1925 Seanad election representing the Farmers' Party. From 1928, he was a member of Cumann na nGaedheal. He remained a senator until the Free State Seanad was abolished in 1936.
