= Michael Fanning (politician) =

Irish politician (1865–1950

Senator
- In office 17 September 1925 – 29 May 1936

Personal details
- Born: c.1865
- Died: 1950 (aged 84–85)
- Party: Cumann na nGaedheal

Michael Fanning (c.1865–1950) was an Irish politician. He was a Cumann na nGaedheal member of Seanad Éireann from 1925 to 1936. A grocer and vintner, he was elected at the 1925 Seanad election for 12 years, and served until the Free State Seanad was abolished in 1936.

For many years, up to the 1940s, Fanning carried on business in Lincoln Place, Dublin, afterwards retiring to his daughter's home near Naas, County Kildare, where he died on 25 June 1950 aged 85.
