= Joseph O'Connor (Irish politician) =

Irish politician (c.1880–1941)

Senator
- In office 17 September 1925 – 29 May 1936

Personal details
- Born: c. 1880
- Died: 6 April 1941 (aged 60–61)
- Party: Cumann na nGaedheal; Fine Gael

Joseph O'Connor (c. 1880 – 6 April 1941) was an Irish politician. He was a cattle salesman and farmer from County Kildare.

At the 1925 Seanad election, he was elected as a Cumann na nGaedheal senator, serving until 1936. He initiated legislation on the improvement of cattle.
