= Michael Duffy (Irish politician) =

Irish politician and trade unionist (died 1957)

Senator
- In office 11 December 1922 – 29 May 1936

Personal details
- Born: County Meath, Ireland
- Died: 1957
- Party: Labour Party

Michael Duffy (died 1957) was an Irish Labour Party politician and trade union official from Dunshaughlin, County Meath.

He was a member of Seanad Éireann from 1922 to 1936. He was a member of the Irish Transport and General Workers' Union and served as the president of the Irish Trades Union Congress in 1934. He was elected to the Free State Seanad for 9 years at the 1922 election, and was re-elected for another 9 years at the 1931 election. He served until the Free State Seanad was abolished in 1936. He died in 1957.

Political offices
Preceded by Seán Campbell	President of the Irish Trades Union Congress; 1934	Succeeded by P. J. Cairns
