= Michael F. O'Hanlon =

Irish politician and farmer (1890–1967)

Senator
- In office 17 September 1925 – 29 May 1936

Personal details
- Born: 8 September 1890
- Died: 27 February 1967 (aged 76)
- Party: Farmers' Party; Cumann na nGaedheal; Fine Gael

Michael F. O'Hanlon (8 September 1890 – 27 February 1967) was an Irish politician, farmer, journalist and company director. He was a member of Seanad Éireann from 1925 to 1936. He was elected at the 1925 Seanad election for 12 years as a Farmers' Party candidate, and served until the Free State Seanad was abolished in 1936. He was a Cumann na nGaedheal member from 1927 to 1933 and a Fine Gael member from 1933 to 1934. He served as Leas-Chathaoirleach of the Seanad from 1932 to 1934.
