= Thomas Westropp Bennett =

Irish politician (1867–1962)

- Thomas Westropp Bennett (left) and George C. Bennett, circa 1928

Cathaoirleach of Seanad Éireann
- In office 6 December 1928 – 19 May 1936
- Preceded by: Lord Glenavy
- Succeeded by: Seán Gibbons

Senator
- In office 11 December 1922 – 29 May 1936

Personal details
- Born: 30 January 1867 Ballymurphy, County Limerick, Ireland
- Died: 1 February 1962 (aged 95)
- Party: Cumann na nGaedheal
- Spouses: Esther Moreton Macdonald (1898–1920); Lila Hapell (m. 1923)
- Children: 1
- Relatives: George C. Bennett (brother)

Thomas William Westropp Bennett (30 January 1867 – 1 February 1962) was an Irish politician, magistrate and public figure in Irish agriculture.

== Early life ==
Born on his father's estate in Ballymurphy in the village of Crecora in County Limerick he was the eldest son (and second of five children) of Captain Thomas Westropp Bennett, a gentleman-farmer, Crimean War veteran and Anne Bennett (née Fitzgerald). One of his younger brothers, George C. Bennett was Cumann na Gaedhael/Fine Gael TD for Limerick County. The Bennetts were an old Limerick family of Protestant gentry who had been resident in Limerick since the 1670s. His father was a Church of Ireland member, but the children followed the Catholic faith of their mother.

Westropp Bennett's ancestors followed the usual occupations of their class: Protestant clergymen, Justice of the Peace (magistrates), landowners or military officers; several cousins (Ensign Thomas Bennett and Lt Joseph Bennett) had fought in the Peninsular War and another, Lt Francis W Bennett, died of wounds after fighting in the Battle of Waterloo. Two maternal ancestors were prominent politicians, Hugh Massy, 2nd Lord Massy of Duntrileague in Henry Grattan's Irish Parliament in the 1780s in both the Irish House of Commons and, later, the Irish House of Lords and General Eyre Massey, first Lord Clarina sat in Grattan's parliament and was later a Union Peer. The family had been politically active at a county level, including a Lord Mayor of Limerick, several Freemen of Limerick and numerous JPs.

Westropp Bennett was educated at Kilkenny College, where he was a contemporary of Admiral of the Fleet, the 1st Earl Beatty (later First Sea Lord of the Royal Navy during World War 1) and the Queen's Service Academy in Dublin but, unusually, did not attend Trinity College Dublin where many of his ancestors had studied. On completion of his education, he returned to the Bennett family's extensive landholdings in Limerick and both farmed and took a prominent role in County Limerick life.

== Career ==
As a magistrate he was active in local government as a district and county councillor and stood for the Westminster Parliament at the January 1910 general election as an Independent Nationalist in West Limerick, with the support of the All-for Ireland League, a non-sectarian alliance of nationalists and unionists, where he came within 70 votes of winning the seat in a close fought contest. His standing in this election reflected a proud family tradition of Irish independence, following on from his ancestor George Bennett, a landed proprietor of Castle Creagh (Gleneffy) House in Limerick, who had signed a petition to Lord Castlereagh in 1799 as a prominent Limerick opponent of the Act of Union.

As Chair of Limerick County Council, where he was a member for the Bruree Division from 1908–1920, he rose to national prominence in a variety of organisations including the Gaelic Language Association, was founder of the Kilmallock show, the Kilmallock Agricultural and Industrial Society and Chair of the Influential Ratepayers Protection Association (1907–11). He was also a member of the District Council for Kilmallock.

A noted agricultural expert, he was on the board of the Irish Agricultural Organisation Society (IAOS) from 1912 where he remained until 1927 with the noted reformer Sir Horace Plunkett. He was elected to the Irish Free State Seanad in 1922 for Cumann na nGaedheal, where he was part of a parliamentary Commission to broker peace in the Irish Civil War.

He was elected as Leas-Chathaoirleach to Lord Glenavy in 1925 and as Cathaoirleach (Chair) of the Senate in 1928, he was vigorous in defending constitutionalism in Irish life during a turbulent time and was engaged in a very high-profile contest with the President of the Executive Council Éamon de Valera in 1935 during the campaign to abolish the Seanad, in which he was assisted by his brother George C. Bennett, a Teachta Dála (TD) in Fine Gael and later Senator. Following the abolition of the senate in 1936 he did not hold public office again, but remained a prominent figure in farming and agricultural circles.

Committed to the link between the United Kingdom and Ireland as equal members of the Commonwealth, he led an Irish delegation to the Empire Parliamentary Conference in 1935 where he dined with British Prime Minister Stanley Baldwin, attended receptions with the King George V and the Duke and the Duchess of York (the future King George VI and Queen Elizabeth) and negotiated with leaders of delegations from South Africa, Canada, Australia, New Zealand, the Indian Raj and many others as well as attending a Fleet Review and visiting many cities in the United Kingdom to promote the Irish Free State.

Always active in Cumann na nGaedheal/Fine Gael, he was instrumental in chairing talks between Eoin O'Duffy and W. T. Cosgrave in the summer of 1933 in Dublin which led to the founding of Fine Gael.

He became Chair of the Irish Agricultural Wholesale Society in 1945 remaining at its helm until his death in February 1962, after a lifetime of public service. He was prominent in many areas of Irish life; he was a member of the Council of University College Cork, Vice-President of the Royal Dublin Society (RDS) (1955–1962), President of the Hibernian United Services Club and President of the Irish Association of Accountants, among many other roles. A keen huntsman, he remained active in the Country Limerick Foxhounds all his life, and enjoyed shooting, the cinema, horse racing and the Irish language.

== Personal life ==
He married twice; his first wife, Esther Moreton Macdonald, was a Scottish aristocrat. She was the great-granddaughter of Thomas Reynolds-Moreton, 4th Baron and first 1st Earl of Ducie, and the granddaughter of Augustus Macdonald, a Scottish Member of Parliament. Her family home was in the baronial Largie Castle in Argyll where her father (and later brother) were the local lairds. She was a debutante in 1892 when she was presented at the Royal Court to Queen Victoria. They married in 1898 when her dowry was £1,200 a year, which helped finance his campaigns; they were married at her family Castle in Argyll in Scotland by Cosmo Gordon Lang, Esther died in 1920 at the age of 51.

In April 1923, he married Lila Hapell (died July 1976), daughter of William Alexander Happell, who had been in the Indian Civil Service. She had been governess to his niece. Initially he lived in an estate called Ballyteigue in Bruree and then another called Ardvullen in Killmallock before inheriting a small estate called Summerville from a cousin in County Limerick which the Irish Republican Army tried to burn down in 1922; he persuaded them to go away, though he himself was unarmed. They had one son, Liam Westropp Bennett, who stood as a Fine Gael candidate in 1954.

His obituary in The Irish Times said that he was from a "prominent and popular family" in the south of Ireland who had rendered much service during the "turbulent early years" of the Irish State. In an interview in 2008 Liam Cosgrave, the Taoiseach, who knew Westropp Bennett and his brother George, well said that Westropp Bennett "a man of principle....who was held in universally high regard".

== Sources ==
- Birth Pangs of A New Nation: Senator Thomas Westropp Bennett and the Irish Free State – History Ireland Magazine October 2003.http://www.historyireland.com/volumes/volume11/issue4/features/?id=296
- Interview Liam Cosgrave/Bruce Finch (author of History Ireland magazine article "Birth Pangs of a new Nation") RDS Dublin Dec 2008.

Oireachtas
Preceded by Lord Glenavy	Cathaoirleach of Seanad Éireann; 1928–1936	Succeeded by Seán Gibbons
