= Joseph Connolly (Irish politician) =

Irish politician (1885–1961)

- Connolly in 1933

Minister for Lands and Fisheries
- In office 8 February 1933 – 29 May 1936
- Preceded by: P. J. Ruttledge
- Succeeded by: Frank Aiken

Minister for Posts and Telegraphs
- In office 9 March 1932 – 8 February 1933
- Preceded by: Ernest Blythe
- Succeeded by: Gerald Boland

Senator
- In office 12 December 1928 – 29 May 1936

Personal details
- Born: 19 January 1885 Belfast, Ireland
- Died: 18 January 1961 (aged 75) Dublin, Ireland
- Party: Sinn Féin (to 1923); Fianna Fáil (from 1928)
- Spouse: Róisín McGavock (m. 1916)
- Children: 8
- Relatives: Con Lehane (nephew)
- Education: St Malachy's College

Joseph Connolly (19 January 1885 – 18 January 1961) was an Irish Fianna Fáil politician.

== Early life ==
He was born 41 Alexander Street, west Belfast in 1885, parallel to the Falls Road and was the son of a baker, John Connolly, and Margaret McNeill. He was educated at Milford Street School and at St Malachy's College. Joseph Connolly was an ardent nationalist and became a member of the Conradh na Gaeilge and the Gaelic Athletic Association. As a result of a personality clash with his father he decided not to join the family business and became apprenticed as an engineer with Coombe, Barbour & Coombe Ltd. After a number of months he gave in his notice and secured a new post in the furniture trade of Maguire & Edwards Ltd. He would subsequently establish a furniture business of his own in the city.

== Political life ==
Connolly was a co-founder of the first Freedom Club to propagate Sinn Féin's message in 1911. He was a leader of the Irish Volunteers in Belfast between 1914 and 1916. On 31 January 1916 he married his fiancé, Róisín McGavock, who had completed an Arts Degree at Queen's University Belfast, and they set up home together at Divis Drive near Falls Park. They had eight children together. He was in Dublin for 1916 Easter Rising and Eoin MacNeill sent him to deliver his countermanding order to Drogheda, Belfast and other planned areas of Volunteer mobilisation. After the Easter Rising went ahead anyway in Dublin, Connolly was arrested in Belfast and was interned in Knutsford Prison and Reading Gaol.

After his release he helped re-organise Sinn Féin in Belfast. He was selected as a candidate for the party in the 1918 general election for Mid Antrim. Though unsuccessful he polled 2,791 first preferences and saved his deposit. He served on the Commission of Inquiry into the Resources and Industries of Ireland which had been set up by the First Dáil in 1919. From October 1921 to November 1922 he served as Consul General of the Irish Republic to the United States in New York City. He disposed of his business in Belfast at this time. One of his chief roles was to combat propaganda from Britain unfavourable to Sinn Féin and the IRA. When the Anglo-Irish Treaty was signed he was very cautious in forming an immediate public opinion on it though was nervous about splits in the wider organisation. After the 1922 general election, and the arrival of Professor Timothy Smiddy as an accredited Ambassador in Washington, he was informed that he no longer held any recognition in the eyes of the US Government and so he returned home to Ireland. His family had at this time moved to Dublin and they set up home at Harold's Cross, never returning to Belfast. The Irish Civil War had then commenced and he formally tendered his resignation to the Free State Government.

In February 1923, he joined the National Land Bank for some months and was persuaded to assist Sinn Féin with the 1923 general election. For economic reasons he retreated from politics and established a business in New York and spent some months there each year which he operated from 1923 to 1929. He was aware of political developments in Ireland, however, and would join Fianna Fáil in 1926. In 1928 Connolly was elected a member of the Free State Seanad for nine years and would serve until the Seanad's abolition in 1936. He was the leader of the Fianna Fáil delegation and the Leader of the Opposition. After the 1932 general election Éamon de Valera appointed him as Minister for Posts and Telegraphs in his government and he became the first person to be a Minister while not a member of Dáil Éireann. (Note: He was the only member of the Free State Seanad to serve as a minister, but two members of it successor Seanad Éireann served as ministers: Seán Moylan in 1957, and James Dooge in 1981–1982.)

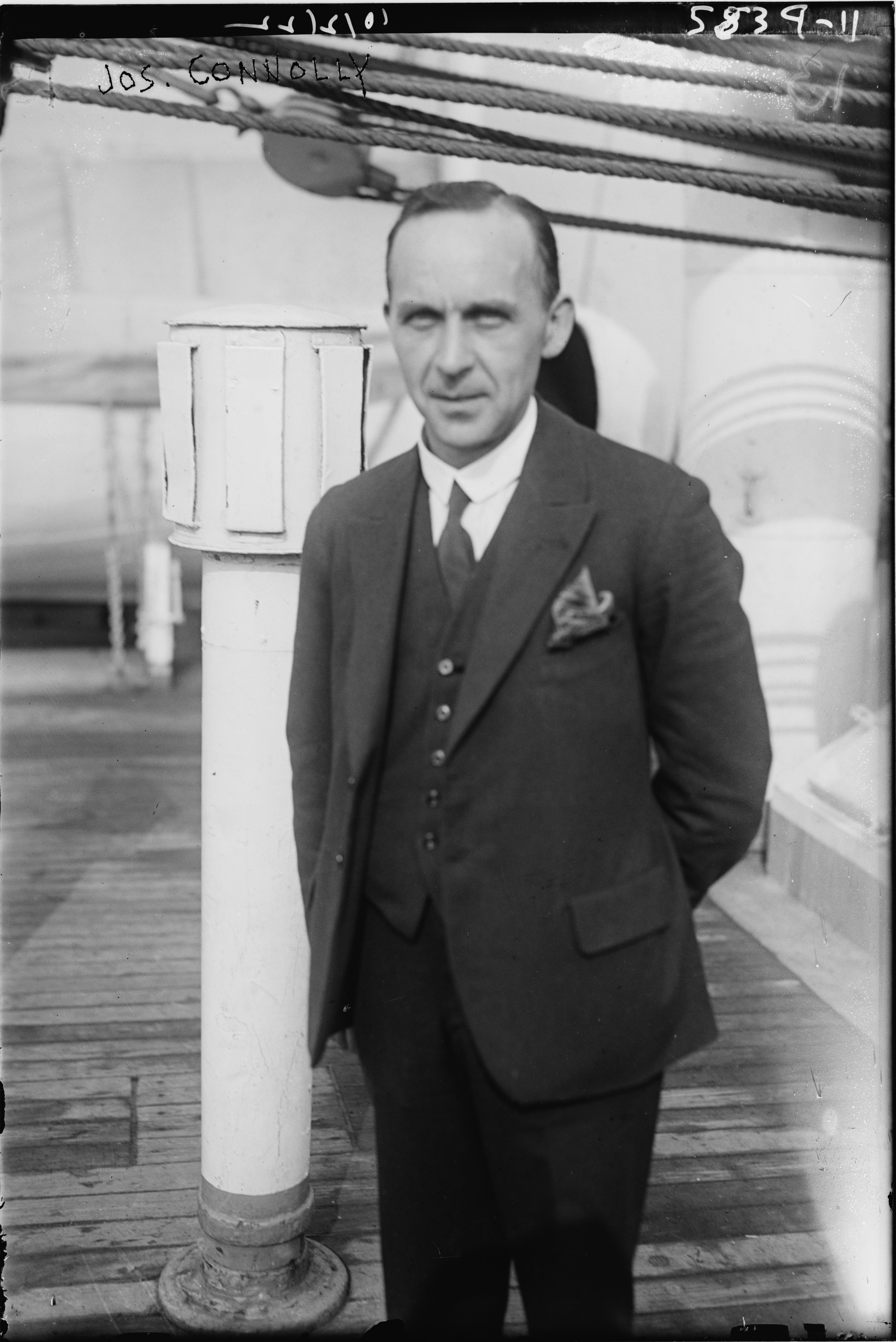
Connolly c. 1922

As a minister, he accompanied de Valera to Geneva and the League of Nations where he attended many sessions. It was at this time that de Valera had voiced his concerns for the future of the League. After the 1933 general election he was appointed as Minister for Lands and Fisheries and was sent on a special mission by de Valera to the United States to repay the Republican bonds which had been bought in the US during the Irish War of Independence. He represented the Government and spoke at the World Economic Conference in London that year but the Conference was not a success partly because the Economic War was in progress between Ireland and the United Kingdom. His chief responsibility was overseeing the work of the Irish Land Commission whose purpose was to re-distribute land to tenants. In 1934, his position was retitled Minister for Lands as responsibility for fisheries was transferred to the Department of Agriculture, in exchange responsibility for forestry, and he oversaw increased planting throughout the state. He ceased being a minister with the abolition of the Seanad. In October 1935, Connolly attended a screening of the Nazi propaganda film Triumph of the Will in Dublin's Olympia Theatre organised by the German legation.

From 1936 until 1950 he served as Chairman of the Office of Public Works (OPW), initially focusing on arterial drainage. In September 1939 he was appointed Controller of Censorship by de Valera. He acted in this role for two years until September 1941 serving under his former cabinet colleague, Frank Aiken. He was based at Upper Yard, Dublin Castle and would in time be the subject of criticism from Opposition politicians and the press as lacking the necessary objectivity, discretion, tact and judgment for such a position. Similar criticism would also be levelled at Aiken. Connolly argued for a strict censorship to prevent any comment that favoured either the British or German forces. This power extended to the press and to the reporting of Dáil speeches. Connolly was highly zealous at his work and his chief opposition came from The Irish Times newspaper and its editor, R. M. Smyllie, and the Fine Gael TD, James Dillon who both viewed Connolly as an Anglophobe.

He resumed his work in the OPW in 1941 and retired from the Civil Service on 19 January 1950 when he was sixty-five. He wrote a number of plays including The Mine Land and Master of the House. Connolly also served as a director of The Irish Press newspaper for a time. He died in 1961, one day before his seventy-sixth birthday.

== Notes ==
Political offices
Preceded by Ernest Blythe	Minister for Posts and Telegraphs; 1932–1933	Succeeded by Gerald Boland
Preceded by P. J. Ruttledge	Minister for Lands and Fisheries; 1933–1936	Succeeded by Frank Aiken
