= Dublin Intelligence =

The Dublin Intelligence or similar was the title of several newspapers published in Dublin in Ireland between 1690 and 1732. The longest running was published by Richard Dickson and/or his associates; several others overlapped with this one.

- 1690–1693 The Dublin Intelligence — published by Andrew II Crooke, the King's Printer, for Robert Thornton. Although published "by authority" of the Dublin Castle administration, it had even less official gazette status than the earlier and later The Dublin Gazette.
- 23 May 1702 – 13 May 1732 The Dublin Intelligence, or sometimes The Old Dublin Intelligence; sometimes subtitled Oxman-Town News, Royal Irish Journal, or Weekly Gazette — published variously by Francis, Elizabeth and Richard Dickson, and Gwyn and Elizabeth Needham.
- 18 July 1702 – 29 August 1702 The Dublin Intelligence — published by Cornelius Carter. Printed at the back of Dick's coffee house. As well as news gleaned from the coffee house patrons, its international news was taken from London and Dublin newspapers, packets and foreign correspondence arriving by ship.
- 1708–1709 Edward Waters The Dublin Intelligence, later Protestant Dublin Intelligence and Dublin Weekly Intelligence — published by Edward Waters.
- May 1716 Thomas Humes The Dublin Intelligence, later The Dublin Courant, then The Dublin Gazette or Weekly Courant — published by Thomas Hume.
- 1722–1724 The London Post-Man, or Supplement to the Dublin Intelligence — published by James Carson; despite its subtitle it was unconnected to any other Dublin Intelligence .

Some are available online via the Burney Collection of Newspapers.

== Sources ==
- Munter, R. L. (1960). A hand-list of Irish newspapers, 1685–1750. Cambridge Bibliographical Society Monographs. Vol. 4. London: Bowes and Bowes – via Internet Archive.
