= The Dublin Gazette =

Government gazette of Ireland from 1705 to 1922

The Dublin Gazette was the gazette, or official newspaper, of the Irish Executive, the British-controlled government in Ireland based at Dublin Castle, between 1705 and 1922. Like the London Gazette on which it was modelled, its strapline was "Published by Authority", and it published notices of government business, including proclamations, the granting of royal assent to bills, writs of election, appointments to public office, commissions and promotions in the armed forces, and awards of honours, as well as notices of insolvency, grants of arms or change of name. The most important notices were generally printed in both the Dublin and London gazettes.

After the 1921–1922 partition of Ireland, The Dublin Gazette was superseded in Northern Ireland by The Belfast Gazette and in the Irish Free State by Iris Oifigiúil.

== History ==
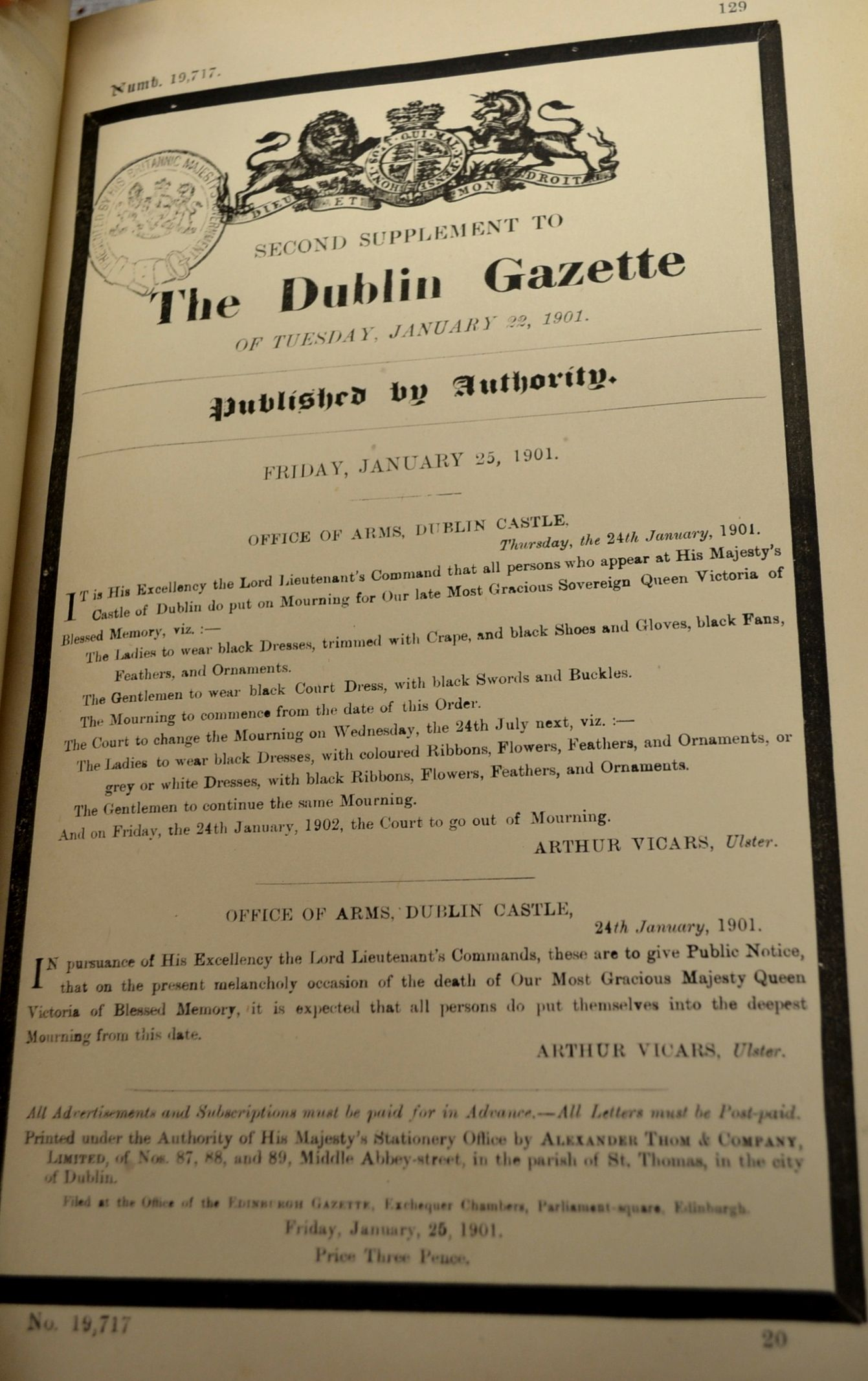
Announcement by Arthur Vicars in The Dublin Gazette of the mourning dress required of visitors to Dublin Castle after the 1901 death of Queen Victoria

In 1670, when Elisha Leighton became Chief Secretary for Ireland, he began a gazette in Dublin, but stopped after a few months because there was "so little news to 'stuff'" it. Notices relating to Ireland were occasionally published in the London Gazette, for example the statutory preparation for the 1679 Irish Parliament. In late 1688 James II fled London and was deposed as king; in 1689 he established a power base in Dublin, summoned an Irish Parliament in May and established a gazette. After James lost the Battle of the Boyne to William III, the office of King's Printer was restored to Andrew II Crooke, whose Dublin Intelligence claimed to be "published by authority" from 1690 to 1693. This newspaper's official status was marginal; Dublin Castle made little input and reprimanded it for publishing a "scandalous" notice from the Jacobite Sir Theobald Butler.

In 1705, under the Lord Lieutenancy of the 2nd Duke of Ormonde, a new Dublin Gazette was founded, although in its early days it was only two pages in length. The earliest surviving copy, dated 9 February 1706, is numbered as Issue 84 and is held in the Library of Trinity College Dublin (TCD). The Dublin Gazette's first printer was Edwin Sandys: a proclamation dated from Dublin Castle on 25 October 1705 notified the people of Ireland that "to prevent imposition by the publication of any false news, the Lords Justices directed the paper entitled The Dublin Gazette to be published by their authority, and had appointed their secretary, Edwin Sandys, to peruse the same constantly, before it be printed; and that Edwin Sandys, at the Custom House Printing-office, should be the printer and publisher thereof."

The first act of the Parliament of Ireland referring to the Gazette was in 1727, requiring the publication in "the Dublin-Gazette published by authority" of the details of each new inmate in debtors' prison, for the benefit of creditors. That year three different periodicals were using the title "Dublin Gazette": the authorised one printed and published by J. Gowan from 21 June; another by Christopher Dickson was titled the "Dublin Gazette" from 3 June until 4 July, when it was renamed Dickson's News-Letter and Flying Post; while Thomas Hume's Dublin Courant was in August 1726 renamed The Dublin Gazette: or, Weekly Courant, and continued until at least 1729.

The official status of the Gazette, through various changes of printer, is unclear prior to 21 August 1750, when the series of copies collected in the Chief Secretary's Office begins with issue No. 1. Until some decades later, ownership of the title and any profits remained with the printer. Until the 1770s, The Dublin Gazette had less of the character of an organ of government than its London counterpart, since it included foreign news reports and private advertisements besides official notices. However, on 18 March 1776, an Order in Council was made which banned it from publishing news not "guaranteed" by the government. A notice subsequently appeared in the Gazette on 13 April 1776, dated from Dublin Castle on 27 March, stating "that it is his majesty's royal pleasure, that for the future, the Dublin Gazette shall, as nearly as possible, be put upon the same footing as the London Gazette; and that it shall contain no other articles of news than such as are authorized by his majesty's government of this kingdom, or duly authenticated; and his excellency the Lord-Lieutenant of Ireland has appointed Mr W. Roseingrave compiler of the said Dublin Gazette."

The office of Compiler of The Dublin Gazette was in fact a sinecure; William Roseingrave had been first appointed during pleasure under letters patent on 20 April 1763, at which time he was already under secretary to the Second Secretary. Roseingrave died in 1780 and was succeeded by William Williams Hewitt, son of James Hewitt, 1st Viscount Lifford; he died in 1798 and was succeeded by Nicholas Price, a relative of Viscount Castlereagh.

The printers of the Gazette held onto their ownership until almost the end of the 18th century. There was a sensation on 9 April 1799, when two rival versions were published, one by the established publisher, Sir St George O'Kelly, and a second by George II Grierson, the King's Printer, who claimed authorisation from Price, the new Compiler. O'Kelly complained, to no avail, about the expropriation of his interest, thereafter losing the right to publish the title. Murphy surmises that, the year between the 1798 Rebellion and the Act of Union, the Irish government felt it needed total control. The Union abolished the Irish Parliament and hugely decreased the work for a King's Printer, such that printing the Gazette provided most of Grierson's business for several years. In the financial years 1819 to 1820, fees paid by the government to Grierson for printing notices in the Dublin Gazette amounted to £6,354, compared to a total of £15,021 for printing in various private newspapers.

As part of the 1817 absorption of the Exchequer of Ireland into the British Exchequer, the office of Compiler was among those scheduled to be abolished upon the demise of the present holder. In 1834, George III Grierson testified that he as printer paid fees of £1200 to Price as Compiler, that Price also received a salary of £300 from the Dublin Castle administration, and that Price did no work but was accountable for any errors. Price denied that his office was a sinecure, but in September 1836 he surrendered his patent in return for an annual pension of £1,590, which The Spectator reckoned eight times the value of the work he had been doing. In 1850, Alexander Thom took over as printer from Grierson's sons. Changes in 1836 and 1850 meant the printer produced the Gazette on a contract basis rather than retaining the profits, and government notices were included without charge. In the 1880s annual profits for the government were £400–£500.

Legal changes during the Tithe War of the 1830s required Church of Ireland ministers to place notices relating to their tithes within the Gazette, causing them to complain at the expense, responsibility for which was uncertain. In 1865, the Irish Court for Criminal Cases Reserved said that an 1857 issue of The Dublin Gazette which stated it was "printed by authority" was not prima facie admissible evidence under a statute requiring it to state that it was "printed by the Queen's authority". By contrast, the High Court of Justice in Ireland ruled in 1902 that a similar statute was satisfied by a 1902 issue which stated at the start it was "published by authority" and at the end that it was "printed under the authority of His Majesty's Stationery Office".

Front page of the Gazette for 14 August 1877 (click to read the full issue)

In evidence to an official enquiry in 1856, the Secretary to the Commissioners of Charitable Donations and Bequests for Ireland noted that a bequest for £3,000 had gone unclaimed for years despite being posted in the Gazette, and said, "there ought to be some better medium than the Gazette, which, it has been said, is a place to keep a secret." When an 1891 Land Purchase Bill required certain notices be printed in the Dublin Gazette, Thomas Sexton secured an additional requirement to place the notice in a newspaper published in the same county as the land for purchase; he argued "that Gazette only circulates among officials, mainly in the City of Dublin".

Until September 1887 the Gazette published average cereal prices from major towns. In 1898 the cessation was ruled in court to have the unintended consequence that quarter sessions and the Irish Land Commission lost their statutory power to alter agricultural rents based on the reported prices. In the debate on the 1900 bill that removed the anomaly, Independent Nationalist MP Tim Healy said, "the editor of the Dublin Gazette ... is the one journalist who is always entitled to my sympathy, and I suppose he was so busy printing coercion proclamations that, in the language of Fleet Street, his columns were "crowded out," and he had no room for printing the corn returns. ... I think also that if these corn returns in the Dublin Gazette, and even if the Gazette itself disappeared, Ireland as a whole would not be sorry."

At the beginning of the Easter Rising of 1916, the Gazette published a proclamation by Lord Wimborne, as Lord Lieutenant of Ireland, of martial law. This stated that "certain evilly disposed persons" had "with deadly weapons attacked the Forces of the Crown". The Gazette ceased publication during the Rising and for more than a week following it, with the result that a compendium issue was later published for the period between 25 April and 9 May 1916.

=== Printers ===
Printers of The Dublin Gazette
Dates	Name	Notes	Refs
1690	James Malone	Authorised by James II; only known issue is dated 29 March	
c.Apr 1705–May 1708	Edwin Sandys	Died in office	
1 Jun 1708–16 May 1724	Ann Sandys	Using her late husband's name; their son Edwin was not a printer	
6 Jun 1724–23 Feb 1726	Pressick Rider and Thomas Harbin	Dropped after Rider printed anti-government pamphlet.	
21 Jun 1727–2 Oct 1742	John and Jonathan Gowan	Only John is named in the 1727 authorisation but both he and his father Jonathan in 1742 revocation; some copies credit 'J. Gowan'. Briefly restarted numbering at No. 1 but reverted. Issues after 14 July 1742 were not "printed by authority".	
28 Sep 1742–12 Jul 1743	Thomas Bacon	briefly restarted numbering at No. 1 but reverted; last no. 1,658.	
23 Aug–10 Dec 1743	Augustus Long		
13 Dec 1743–[Jan 1746?]	Augustus Long and Samuel Forbes	Last known issue 10 April 1744	
Feb 1746–[Jul 1750?]	Halhed Garland	Last known issue May 1748	
21 Aug 1750–1754	Richard James and John Butler	restarted numbering at No. 1	
1754–Mar 1757	Richard James	Died in office.	
5 Mar 1757–30 Jun 1761	Alice James	widow of Richard James	
4 Jul 1761–1789	Timothy Dyton	second husband of Alice James	
1789–Jul 1796	Timothy Dyton and St. George O'Kelly	O'Kelly married Mary James, daughter of Richard and Alice James	
Jul 1796–Apr 1799	St. George O'Kelly	After Dyton's death.	
Apr 1799–1821	George II Grierson	King's Printer and grandson of George Grierson	
1821–Dec 1850	George III Grierson and John Grierson	Sons of George II Grierson	
Jan 1851–27 Jan 1922	Alexander Thom's	King's Printer from 1871. The firm of Thom's retained the contract after its founder's death.	

== Supersession ==
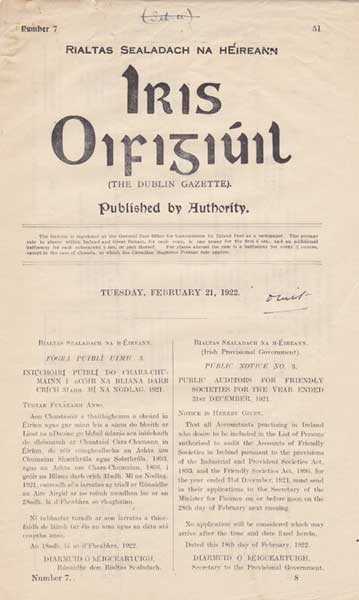
Early issues of Iris Oifigiúil had subtitle "(The Dublin Gazette)"

From 1919, during the Irish War of Independence, the Gazette was challenged by the Irish Bulletin, the official newspaper of the rival government of the self-proclaimed Irish Republic, produced clandestinely by its Department of Propaganda and appearing weekly from 11 November 1919 to 11 July 1921.

The Government of Ireland Act 1920 led to the creation of Northern Ireland in May 1921 and The Belfast Gazette, which first appeared on 7 June 1921, printed notices from the Northern Ireland government and the local authorities in its jurisdiction. Various Orders in Council, made by the Lord Lieutenant in 1921 and 1922 and his successor the Governor of Northern Ireland in 1922 and 1923, provided that references in previous legislation to The Dublin Gazette would be construed in relation to Northern Ireland as to the Belfast Gazette.

The War of Independence resulted in the Anglo-Irish Treaty, signed in London on 6 December 1921, and a nationalist Provisional Government recognised by the British on 16 January 1922 took over administration within what had been Southern Ireland and would become the Irish Free State. The final issue of The Dublin Gazette (number 21,977) was printed by Thom's and published on 27 January 1922. Four days later, now by authority of the Provisional Government, Thom's printed issue No. 1 of Iris Oifigiúil, initially with "The Dublin Gazette" as a subtitle and an essentially unchanged layout, except that the masthead changed the name and removed the royal arms. The name "Iris Oifigiúil (the Dublin Gazette)" was also used in statutory orders made by Diarmaid Fawsitt under the authority of the Provisional Government.

In December 1922, the Constitution of the Irish Free State came into force, the Provisional Government became the Executive Council, and the Free State Oireachtas passed an Adaptation of Enactments Act, which provided that references in British legislation to The Dublin Gazette would be construed as Iris Oifigiúil.

== Archives ==
=== Surviving copies ===
The issues of James II's gazette were destroyed by William III. A single issue survives in the ownership of the Library Company of Philadelphia (LCP). There is no complete run of the re-established gazette in existence for the years 1705–1750. The National Library of Ireland (NLI), the Library of Trinity College Dublin (TCD) and the British Library (BL) have substantial, albeit incomplete holdings for this period. The only complete set from 1750 onwards is in the Oireachtas library. The NLI, BL and TCD Library have complete runs from 1790, 1855 and 1891 respectively. The Institute of Historical Research has a 'more or less complete' run from the mid-1840s. The LCP also has some mid-18th century issues.

=== Digitisation ===
Unlike the London, Belfast and Edinburgh Gazettes, the Dublin Gazette has not been thoroughly digitised. The Oireachtas volumes from 1750 to 1815 (except 1759, 1776, 1777) have been digitised, and individual issues can be freely searched and downloaded from both the library's catalogue and JSTOR. The same scans (up to 1800) can also be viewed on the 'Virtual Record Treasury of Ireland' website. Other digitised issues exist on subscriber-only websites. These include the Burney Collection of Newspapers (1708–1712; 1724–1725; 1797) and NewspaperArchive (incomplete 1706–1744; from a 1950 microfilm, metadata misdates some issues as 18xx or 19xx instead of 17xx).

== See also ==
- Dublin Gazette, a contemporary organisation operating in the city, who have had an online presence since 2020.

== Sources ==
- Hammond, Joseph W. (1953). ""The Dublin Gazette," 1705–1922". Dublin Historical Record. 13 (3–4): 108–117. ISSN 0012-6861. JSTOR 30103813.
- Murphy, Seán (January–February 2006). "300 Years of Irish Gazetteering". History Ireland. 14 (1): 11–12. ISSN 0791-8224. JSTOR 27725383.
- Pollard, Mary (2000). A Dictionary of Members of the Dublin Book Trade 1550–1800. Bibliographical Society. ISBN 978-0-948170-11-9.
- Select Committee On Sinecure Offices (25 July 1834). Report; with Minutes of Evidence and Appendix. Parliamentary Papers. Vol. HC 1834 vi (519) 339. London.
