= History of British newspapers =

Dates to the 17th century

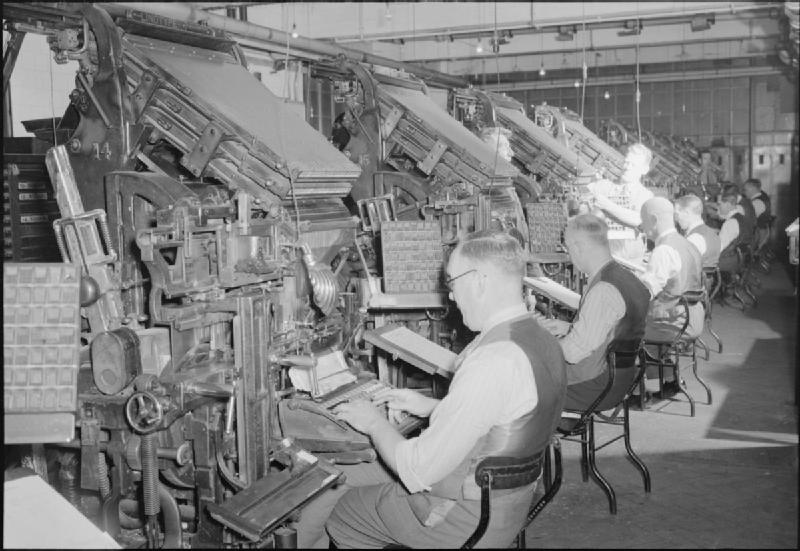
Linotype operators preparing hot-metal type 'slugs' to be assembled in columns and pages by hand compositors. This letterpress mode of newspaper production was supplanted in the 1970s and 1980s by the cleaner, more economical offset litho process.

The history of British newspapers begins in the 18th century with the emergence of regular publications covering news and gossip. The relaxation of government censorship in the late 17th century led to a rise in publications, which in turn led to an increase in regulation throughout the 18th century. The Times began publication in 1785 and became the leading newspaper of the early 19th century, before the lifting of taxes on newspapers and technological innovations led to a boom in newspaper publishing in the late 19th century. Mass education and increasing affluence led to new papers such as the Daily Mail emerging at the end of the 19th century, aimed at lower middle-class readers.

In the early 20th century, the British press was dominated by a few wealthy press barons. Many papers published more popular stories, including sports and other features, in an attempt to boost circulation. In 1969 Rupert Murdoch bought and relaunched The Sun as a tabloid and soon added pictures of topless models on Page 3. Within a few years the Sun was the UK's most popular newspaper.

In the 1980s national newspapers began to move out of Fleet Street, the traditional home of the British national press since the 18th century. By the early 21st century newspaper circulation began to decline.

In the early 2010s many British newspapers were implicated in a major phone hacking scandal which led to the closure of the News of the World after 168 years of publication and the Leveson Inquiry into press standards.

== 17th century ==
During the 17th century many kinds of news publications told both news and rumours, such as pamphlets, posters and ballads. Even when news periodicals emerged, many of these co-existed with them. A news periodical differs from these mainly because of its periodicity. The definition for 17th-century newsbooks and newspapers is that they are published at least once a week. Johann Carolus' Relation aller Fürnemmen und gedenckwürdigen Historien, published in Strassburg in 1605, is usually regarded as the first news periodical.

At the beginning of the 17th century the authorities in England strictly controlled the right to print. This probably explains why the first newspaper in the English language was printed in Rome by Joris Veseler around 1620. This followed the style established by Veseler's earlier Dutch paper Courante uyt Italien, Duytslandt, &c.

In 1622 Nathaniel Butter reportedly initiated the first news periodical published in England. It appeared under various titles including the Weekly News. When the English started printing their own papers in London, they reverted to the pamphlet format used by contemporary books. The publication of these newsbooks was suspended between 1632 and 1638 by order of the Star Chamber. After they resumed publication, the era of these newsbooks lasted until the publication of the Oxford Gazette in 1665.

Official control over printing relaxed greatly after the abolition of the Star Chamber in 1641. The English Civil War of 1642-1651 escalated the demand for news. News pamphlets or books reported the war, often supporting one side or the other. A number of publications arose after the Restoration of 1660, including The London Gazette (first published on 18 November 1665 as the Oxford Gazette), the first official journal of record and the newspaper of the Crown. Publication was controlled under the Licensing Act 1662, but the act's lapses from 1679 to 1685 and from 1695 onwards encouraged a number of new titles.

Mercurius Caledonius, founded in Edinburgh in 1660, was Scotland's first but short-lived newspaper. Only 12 editions were published during 1660 and 1661.

In English-language usage, the term "News Papers" dates from 1667, with the form "Newspapers" appearing from 1688.

== 18th century ==
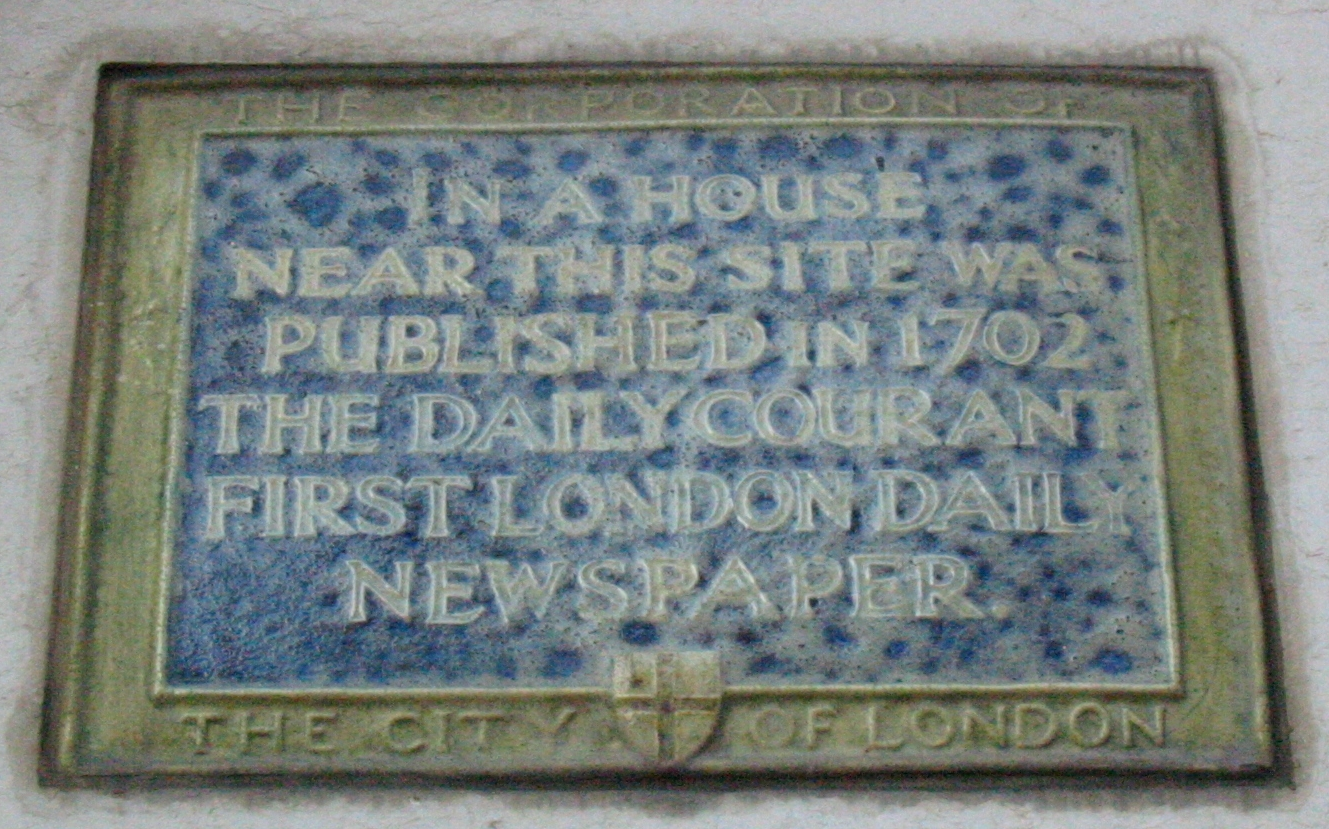
This plaque in London marks the publication in 1702 of The Daily Courant as London's first daily newspaper.

There were twelve London newspapers and 24 provincial papers by the 1720s. The Daily Courant (11 March 1702–1703) was the first successful daily newspaper in London. In 1695 the Postboy had been started as a daily paper (actually the first in London), but only four numbers appeared. The Public Advertiser was started by Henry Woodfall in the 18th century.

The first English journalist to achieve national importance was Daniel Defoe. On 19 February 1704, whilst still in Newgate Prison for a political offence, he began his weekly, The Review, which was eventually printed three times a week and was a forerunner of The Tatler (started by Richard Steele in 1709) and The Spectator (started by Steele and Joseph Addison in 1711). Defoe's Review came to an end in 1713. Between 1716 and 1720 he published a monthly newspaper with old style title, Mercurius Politicus. The Examiner started in 1710 as the chief Conservative political mouthpiece, which enjoyed as its most influential contributor, Jonathan Swift. Swift had control of the journal for 33 issues between November 1710 and June 1711, but once he became dean of St. Patrick's Cathedral in Dublin, he gave up regular journalistic work.

In 1702 Edward Lloyd, the virtual founder of the famous "Lloyd's" of commerce, started a thrice a week newspaper, Lloyd's News, which had but a brief existence in its initial form, but was the precursor of the modern Lloyd's List. The 76th issue of the original paper contained a paragraph mentioning the House of Lords, for which the publisher was told he would have to pay a fine. He preferred to discontinue his publication instead. In 1726 he in part revived it, under the title of Lloyd's List, published at first weekly, it would later become a daily.

The Edinburgh Courant was published out of Edinburgh, Midlothian, Scotland. Its first issue was dated 14-19 Feb 1705 and was sold for a penny. It was one of the country's first regional papers, second only to the Norwich Post (1701). The paper was produced twice weekly for five years, then continued as the Scots Courant until April 1720. Later that same year, the Edinburgh Evening Courant began publication, and it survived until the Evening News came into existence in 1873.

The increasing popularity and influence of newspapers was problematic to the government of the day. The first bill in parliament advocating a tax on newspapers was proposed in 1711. The duty eventually imposed in 1712 was a halfpenny on papers of half a sheet or less and a penny on newspapers that ranged from half a sheet to a single sheet in size. Jonathan Swift expressed in his Journal to Stella on 7 August 1712, doubt in the ability of The Spectator to hold out against the tax. This doubt was proved justified in December 1712 by its discontinuance. However, some of the existing journals continued production and their numbers soon increased. Part of this increase was attributed to corruption and political connections of its owners. Later, toward the middle of the same century, the provisions and the penalties of the Stamp Act were made more stringent, yet the number of newspapers continued to rise. In 1753 the total number of copies of newspapers sold yearly in Britain amounted to 7,411,757. In 1760 it had risen to 9,464,790 and in 1767 to 11,300,980. In 1776 the number of newspapers published in London alone had increased to 53.

The News Letter is one of Northern Ireland's main daily newspapers, published Monday to Saturday. It is the oldest English-language general daily newspaper still in publication in the world, having first been printed in 1737. Originally published three times weekly, it became daily in 1855.

The 18th century saw the gradual development of the purely political journal side by side with those papers which were primarily devoted to news, domestic and foreign, and commerce. It was left to Steele and Addison to develop the social side of journalism in their respective papers. In 1761 the North Briton came out and it was largely a result of its publisher, John Wilkes, and his campaign for increased freedom of the press that, in 1772 the right to publish parliamentary reports was established.

The Observer, first published on 4 December 1791, was the world's first Sunday newspaper.

== 19th century ==
According to Andrew Marr, four major transitions in the Victorian era created modern British journalism. The stamp tax on every paper sold was removed, enabling newspapers to become profitable by selling advertising. Secondly. new industrial technology enabled news to flow in over telegraph wires, and new highspeed presses did overnight printing of hundreds of thousands of copies for distribution by the new railway system to the entire nation. Next the educational system was enlarged from a small elite so that most people could now read a newspaper and study the ads. And finally Victorians developed mass democracy that made public opinion relevant to the formation of public policy.

By the early 19th century, there were 52 London papers and over 100 other titles. As stamp, paper and other duties were progressively reduced from the 1830s onwards (all duties on newspapers were gone by 1855) there was a massive growth in overall circulation as major events and improved communications developed the public's need for information. The Daily Universal Register began life in 1785 and was later to become known as The Times from 1788. This was the most significant newspaper of the first half of the 19th century, but from around 1860 there were a number of more strongly competitive titles, each differentiated by its political biases and interests.

=== Taxes removed ===
In 1802 and 1815 the tax on newspapers was increased to three pence and then four pence. Unable or unwilling to pay this fee, between 1831 and 1835 hundreds of untaxed newspapers made their appearance. The political tone of most of them was fiercely revolutionary. Their publishers were prosecuted but this failed to discourage untaxed newspapers. It was chiefly Milner Gibson and Richard Cobden who advocated the case in parliament to first reduce in 1836 and, in 1855, totally repeal the tax on newspapers. The development of the press was greatly assisted by the gradual abolition of the taxes on periodicals as well as by the introduction of a cheap postal system. Both of these developments made the newspaper more affordable to a greater percentage of the population. The burden of the newspaper tax on publishers was heavy, resulting in 29,400,000 tax stamps being issued in 1820. In 1828 the proprietor of The Times had to pay the state more than £68,000 in taxes.

=== Directories ===
A number of press directories listing newspapers and periodicals were published in the 19th century, including Mitchell's Press Directories, May's handbooks and guides, Deacon's Newspaper Handbook and the Handy Newspaper List.

=== Major papers ===
The Courier is a newspaper published by D. C. Thomson & Co. in Dundee, Scotland. It had five daily editions for Dundee, Fife, Perth and Angus. It was established in 1801 as the Dundee Courier & Argus. Like most papers the entire front page was devoted to classified advertisements; The Courier was unusual in maintaining this format until 1992, before adopting the headline-news format.

Seren Gomer was a Welsh language periodical founded in 1814 by the clergyman and writer Joseph Harris (Gomer), the first Welsh-language newspaper.

The Manchester Guardian was founded in Manchester in 1821 by a group of non-conformist businessmen. Its most famous editor, Charles Prestwich Scott, made the Manchester Guardian into a world-famous newspaper in the 1890s. It is now called The Guardian and published in London.

The Scotsman was launched in 1817 as a liberal weekly newspaper by lawyer William Ritchie and customs official Charles Maclaren in response to the "unblushing subservience" of competing newspapers to the Edinburgh establishment. The paper was pledged to "impartiality, firmness and independence". Its modern editorial line is firmly anti-independence. After the abolition of newspaper stamp tax in Scotland in 1855, The Scotsman was relaunched as a daily newspaper priced at 1d and a circulation of 6,000 copies.

The Chartist Northern Star, first published on 26 May 1838, was a pioneer of popular journalism but was very closely linked to the fortunes of the movement and was out of business by 1852. At the same time there was the establishment of more specialised periodicals and the first cheap newspaper in the Daily Telegraph and Courier (1855), later to be known simply as the Daily Telegraph.

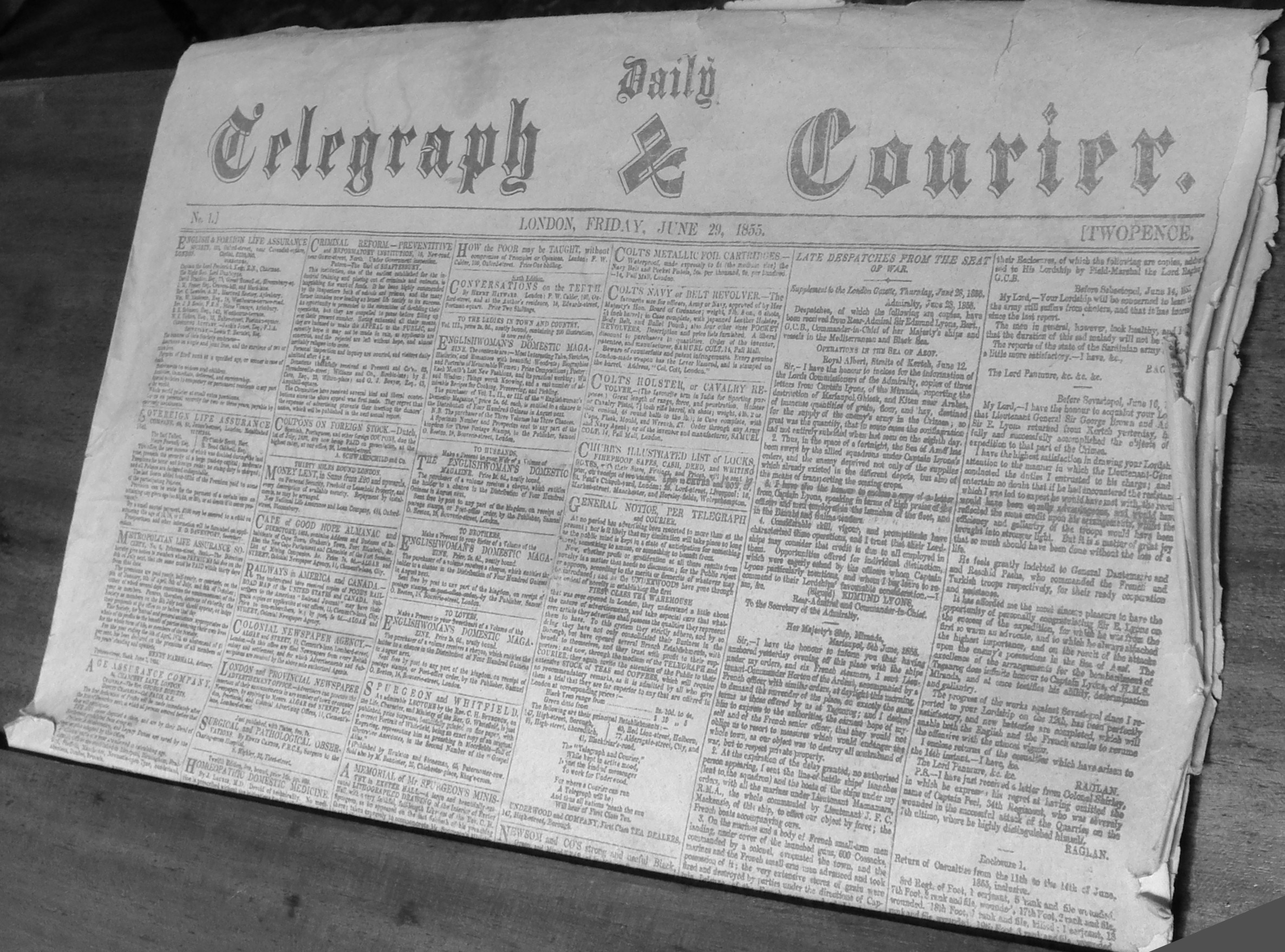
1855 first edition of the Daily Telegraph & Courier

The Daily Telegraph was first published on 29 June 1855 and was owned by Arthur Sleigh, who transferred it to Joseph Levy the following year. Levy produced it as the first penny newspaper in London. His son, Edward Lawson soon became editor, a post he held until 1885. The Daily Telegraph became the organ of the middle class and could claim the largest circulation in the world in 1890. It held a consistent Liberal Party allegiance until opposing Gladstone's foreign policy in 1878 when it turned Unionist.

The Illustrated London News, founded in 1842, was the world's first illustrated weekly newspaper. Mason Jackson, its art editor for thirty years, published in 1885 The Pictorial Press, a history of illustrated newspapers. The Illustrated London News was published weekly until 1971 when it became monthly; bimonthly from 1989; and then quarterly before publication ceased.

The Western Mail was founded in Cardiff in 1869 by John Crichton-Stuart, 3rd Marquess of Bute as a penny daily paper. It describes itself as "the national newspaper of Wales" (originally "the national newspaper of Wales and Monmouthshire"), although it has a very limited circulation in North Wales.

=== Golden Age 1860 to 1910 ===
From 1860 until around 1910 was a 'golden age' of newspaper publication, with technical advances in printing and communication combined with a professionalisation of journalism and the prominence of new owners. Newspapers became more partisan and there was the rise of new or yellow journalism (see William Thomas Stead). Socialist and labour newspapers also proliferated and in 1912 the Daily Herald was launched as the first daily newspaper of the trade union and labour movement.

The Daily Mail was first published in 1896 by Lord Northcliffe. It became Britain's second biggest-selling daily newspaper, outsold only by The Sun. The Daily Mail was Britain's first daily newspaper aimed at the newly literate "lower-middle class market resulting from mass education, combining a low retail price with plenty of competitions, prizes and promotional gimmicks", and the first British paper to sell a million copies a day. It was, from the outset, a newspaper for women, being the first to provide features especially for them, and is the only British newspaper whose readership is more than 50% female, at 53%.

=== Style ===
With literacy rising sharply, the rapidly growing demand for news led to changes in the physical size, visual appeal, heavy use of war reporting, brisk writing style, and an omnipresent emphasis on speedy reporting thanks to the telegraph. Critics noted how London was echoing the emerging New York style of journalism. The new news writing style first spread to the provincial press through the Midland Daily Telegraph around 1900.

Newspapers increasingly made their profit from selling advertising. In the 1850s and 1860s the ads appealed to the increasingly affluent middle-class that sought out a variety of new products. The advertisements announced new health remedies as well as fresh foods and beverages. The latest London fashions were featured in the regional press. The availability of repeated advertising permitted manufacturers to develop nationally known brand names that had a much stronger appeal than generic products.

== 20th century ==
After the war, the major newspapers engaged in a large-scale circulation race. The political parties, which long had sponsored their own papers, could not keep up, and one after another their outlets were sold or closed down. Sales in the millions depended on popular stories, with a strong human interesting theme, as well as detailed sports reports with the latest scores. Serious news was a niche market and added very little to the circulation base. The niche was dominated by The Times and, to a lesser extent, The Daily Telegraph. Consolidation was rampant, as local dailies were bought up and added to chains based in London. James Curran and Jean Seaton report:

after the death of Lord Northcliffe in 1922, four men, Lords Beaverbrook (1879-1964), Rothermere (1868-1940), Camrose (1879-1954) and Kemsley (1883-1968)–became the dominant figures in the inter-war press. In 1937, for instance, they owned nearly one in every two national and local daily papers sold in Britain, as well as one in every three Sunday papers that were sold. The combined circulation of all their newspapers amounted to over thirteen million.

The Times was long the most influential prestige newspaper, although far from having the largest circulation. It gave far more attention to serious political and cultural news. In 1922, John Jacob Astor (1886-1971), son of the 1st Viscount Astor (1849-1919), bought The Times from the Northcliffe estate. The paper advocated appeasement of Hitler's demands. Its editor Geoffrey Dawson was closely allied with Prime Minister Neville Chamberlain, and pushed hard for the Munich Agreement in 1938. Candid news reports by Norman Ebbutt from Berlin that warned of warmongering were rewritten in London to support the appeasement policy. In March 1939, however, it reversed course and called for urgent war preparations.

Most of the "press barons" who owned and closely supervised major newspapers were empire builders focused on making money and extending their audience. A few tried to exploit their captive audiences to help shape British politics, but they were largely unsuccessful. The large papers were all mildly conservative but none were organs of the Conservative Party. The Liberals lost nearly all their media and Labour had one small captive outlet, The Daily Herald. The largely lower-middle-class readership wanted entertainment not political guidance. In 1931 Conservative former prime minister Stanley Baldwin denounced the media barons who had become his enemies by repeated Kipling's words: "What proprietorship of these papers is aiming at is power, and power without responsibility—the prerogative of the harlot throughout the ages." Lord Beaverbrook owned the best-selling Daily Express as well as London's Evening Standard and the Sunday Express. It was alleged that he played favourites, giving publicity to politicians he supported, and largely ignoring his enemies. Beaverbrook vehemently denied the allegations. Beaverbrook in 1929 launched a new political party to promote free trade within the British Empire. His Empire Free Trade Crusade had little success; Beaverbrook quickly lost interest, and the new party soon vanished.

=== Developments ===
By the 1930s, over two-thirds of the population read a newspaper every day, with "almost everyone" taking one on Sundays.

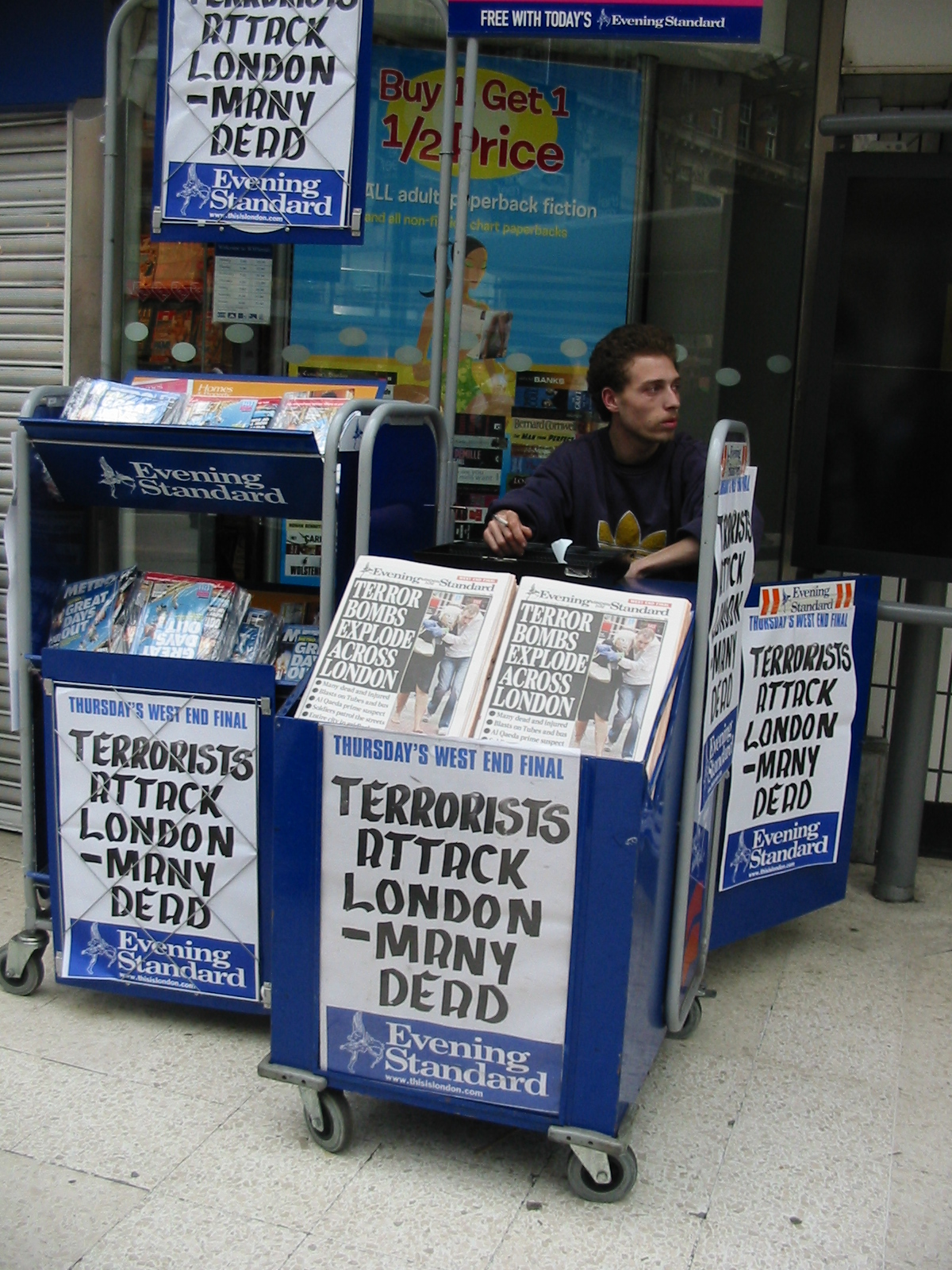
Evening Standard headlines on 7 July 2005

The Morning Star was founded in 1930 as the Daily Worker, organ of the Communist Party of Great Britain (CPGB). is a left-wing British daily tabloid newspaper with a focus on social and trade union issues.

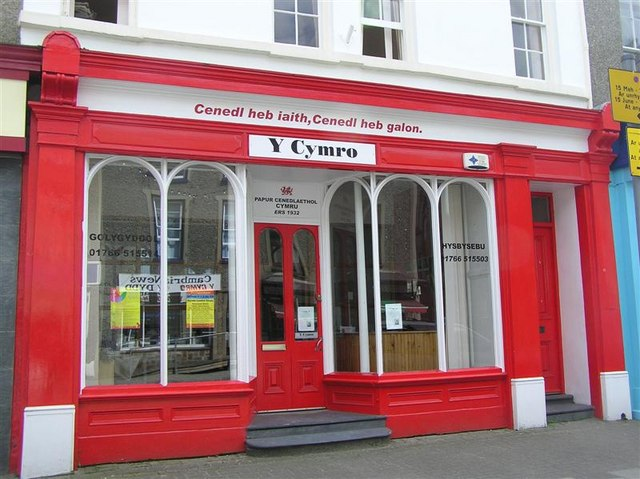
Y Cymro (The Welshman) is a Welsh language national weekly paper first published in 1932.

A 1938 Report on the British Press (from the think tank Political and Economic Planning) expressed concerns that "a dangerous tendency has recently been manifesting itself by which entertainment ceases to be ancillary to news and either supersedes it or absorbs it; many people welcome a newspaper that under the guise of presenting news, enables them to escape from the grimness of actual events and the effort of thought by opening the backdoor of triviality and sex appeal. Such readers are left ill-informed and unable to participate intelligently in political debate." The report also contained worries about the fact that "general accuracy of the Press is comparatively low by scientific or administrative standards," and about early press intrusion causing "considerable public indignation against sections of the press." They closed by advising "the formation of a Press Tribunal to address complaints, and a Press Institute to provide continuous scientific study of the Press."

The first Royal Commission on the Press recommended in 1949 that a General Council of the Press should be formed to govern the behaviour of the print media. In response to a threat of statutory regulation, the voluntary General Council of the Press was formed in 1953, funded by newspaper proprietors. Membership was initially restricted to newspaper editors but was reformed as the Press Council in 1962, with 20 per cent lay members. The council had a non-binding regulatory framework with the stated aim of maintaining high standards of ethics in journalism. In 1980 the National Union of Journalists withdrew from membership. In 1991, the Press Council was replaced by the Press Complaints Commission.

When he relaunched the flagging Sun newspaper in tabloid format on 17 November 1969, Rupert Murdoch began publishing photographs of clothed glamour models on its third page. Page 3 photographs over the following year were often provocative, but did not feature nudity. On 17 November 1970, editor Larry Lamb celebrated the tabloid's first anniversary by publishing a photograph of a model in the nude sitting in a field with one of her breasts visible from the side. The Sun gradually began to feature Page Three girls in more overtly topless poses. Although these photographs caused controversy at the time, and led to the Sun being banned from some public libraries, they are partly credited with the increased circulation that established the Sun as one of the most popular newspapers in the United Kingdom by the mid-1970s. In an effort to compete with the Sun, the Daily Mirror and Daily Star tabloids also began publishing images of topless women. The Mirror stopped featuring topless models in the 1980s, deeming the photographs demeaning to women.

The Scottish Daily News was a left-of-centre daily newspaper published in Glasgow between 5 May and 8 November 1975. It was hailed as Britain's first worker-controlled, mass-circulation daily, formed as a workers' cooperative by 500 of the 1,846 journalists, photographers, engineers, and print workers who were made redundant in April 1974 by Beaverbrook Newspapers when the Scottish Daily Express closed its printing operations in Scotland and moved to Manchester.

The Wapping dispute was a significant turning point in the history of the trade union movement and of UK industrial relations. It started on 24 January 1986 when some 6,000 newspaper workers went on strike after protracted negotiation with their employers, News International (parent of Times Newspapers and News Group Newspapers, and chaired by Rupert Murdoch). News International had built and clandestinely equipped a new printing plant for all its titles in the London district of Wapping, and when the print unions announced a strike it activated this new plant with the assistance of the Electrical, Electronic, Telecommunications and Plumbing Union (EETPU). Despite the widespread use of the offset litho printing process elsewhere, the Murdoch papers in common with the rest of Fleet Street continued to be produced by the hot-metal and labour-intensive Linotype method, rather than being composed electronically. Eddy Shah's Messenger group, in a long-running and bitter dispute at Warrington had benefited from the Thatcher government's trade union legislation to allow employers to de-recognise unions, enabling the company to use an alternative workforce and new technology in newspaper production. He launched Today on Tuesday 4 March 1986, as a middle-market tabloid, a rival to the long-established Daily Mail and Daily Express. It pioneered computer photosetting and full-colour offset printing at a time when national newspapers were still using Linotype machines and letterpress. Established national newspapers converted to electronic production and colour printing. Today ceased publication on 17 November 1995, the first long-running national newspaper title to close since the Daily Sketch in 1971.

By 1988, nearly all the national newspapers had abandoned Fleet Street to relocate in the Docklands, and had begun to change their printing practices to those being employed by News International. Even though the last major British news office, Reuters, left in 2005, the term Fleet Street continues to be used as a metonym for the British national press.

The Independent was first published on 7 October 1986. The paper was created at a time of fundamental change and attracted staff from the two Murdoch broadsheets who had chosen not to move to the new headquarters in Wapping. Launched with the advertising slogan "It is. Are you?", and challenging The Guardian for centre-left readers, and The Times as a newspaper of record, it reached a circulation of over 400,000 in 1989. Competing in a moribund market, The Independent sparked a general freshening of newspaper design as well as a price war.

The European, billed as "Europe's first national newspaper", was a weekly newspaper founded by Robert Maxwell. It lasted from 11 May 1990 until December 1998. The circulation peaked at 180,000, over half of which was British. The Barclay brothers bought the newspaper in 1992, investing an estimated $110 million and in 1996 transforming it into a high-end tabloid format oriented at the business community edited by Andrew Neil.

By the 1980s Robert Maxwell's various companies owned the Daily Mirror, the Sunday Mirror, the Scottish Daily Record and Sunday Mail and several other newspapers. Maxwell was litigious against those who would speak or write against him. The satirical magazine Private Eye lampooned him as "Cap'n Bob" and the "bouncing Czech", the latter nickname having originally been devised by Prime Minister Harold Wilson (under whom Maxwell was an MP). Maxwell took out several libel actions against Private Eye. Maxwell's untimely death triggered a flood of instability with banks frantically calling in their massive loans, and his publishing empire collapsed. It emerged that, without adequate prior authorisation, Maxwell had used hundreds of millions of pounds from his companies' pension funds to shore up the shares of the Mirror Group, to save his companies from bankruptcy.

== 21st century ==
In 2005, the UK-based online newspaper PinkNews was established. It is targeted towards the lesbian, gay, bisexual and transgender community (LGBT) in the UK and worldwide.

=== The phone hacking scandal ===
The News International phone hacking scandal is an ongoing controversy involving the News of the World and other British newspapers published by News International, a subsidiary of Murdoch's News Corporation. Employees of the newspaper were convicted of engaging in phone hacking, police bribery, and exercising improper influence in the pursuit of publishing stories. Advertiser boycotts contributed to the closure of the News of the World on 10 July 2011, ending 168 years of publication.

The Leveson Inquiry was a judicial public inquiry into the British press; a series of public hearings were held throughout 2011 and 2012. The Inquiry published the Leveson Report in November 2012, which reviewed the general culture and ethics of the British media, and made recommendations for a new, The independent, body to replace the existing Press Complaints Commission, which would be recognised by the state through new laws.

=== Declining circulation ===
During the early 21st century, newspaper circulation dropped rapidly. The sector's advertising revenues fell 15% during 2015 alone, with estimates of a further 20% drop over the course of 2016. ESI ceased print of The Independent that year- the newspaper having suffered a 94% drop in sales from its peak in the 1980s. The decline of the newspaper industry has been linked to the rise of internet usage in Britain.

In 2017, European Broadcasting Union research found that people in the United Kingdom trusted the written press least of any European country, by a considerable margin. Within the United Kingdom the written press was trusted less than television and the radio.

== See also ==
- List of newspapers in the United Kingdom
- Newspaper hawker, the newsboys who sold papers
- Online newspaper
- Welsh Newspapers Online
- Perfect Occurrences—a newspaper of the English Civil War period, favoured by the Parliament side.
