= Gazette =

Official journal, newspaper, or newspaper of record

A gazette is an official journal, a newspaper of record, or simply a newspaper.

In English and French speaking countries, newspaper publishers have applied the name Gazette since the 17th century; today, numerous weekly and daily newspapers bear the name The Gazette.

== Etymology ==
Gazette is a loanword from the French language, which is, in turn, a 16th-century permutation of the Italian gazzetta, which is the name of a particular Venetian coin, which was the price for a popular printed sheet of news. Gazzetta became an epithet for newspaper during the early and middle 16th century, when the first Venetian newspapers cost one gazzetta. (Compare with other vernacularisms from publishing lingo, such as the British penny dreadful and the American dime novel.) This loanword, with its various corruptions, persists in numerous modern languages (Slavic languages, Turkic languages).

== Government gazettes ==
In England, with the 1700 founding of The Oxford Gazette (which became the London Gazette), the word gazette came to indicate a public journal of the government; today, such a journal is sometimes called a government gazette. For some governments, publishing information in a gazette was or is a legal necessity by which official documents come into force and enter the public domain. Such is the case for documents published in Royal Thai Government Gazette (est. 1858), in The Gazette of India (est. 1950), and in Nepal Rajpatra (est. 1951)

The government of the United Kingdom requires government gazettes of its member countries. Publication of the Edinburgh Gazette, the official government newspaper in Scotland, began in 1699. The Dublin Gazette of Ireland followed in 1705, but ceased on 27 January 1922 as part of the transfer of power to the Provisional Government, ahead of the establishment of the Irish Free State; the Irish: Iris Oifigiúil (Official Gazette) replaced it. The Belfast Gazette of Northern Ireland published its first issue in 1921.

== Gazette as a verb ==
Chiefly in British English, the transitive verb to gazette means "to announce or publish in a gazette"; especially where gazette refers to a public journal or a newspaper of record. For example, "Lake Nakuru was gazetted as a bird sanctuary in 1960 and upgraded to National Park status in 1968." Gazettal (a noun) is the act of gazetting; for example, "the gazettal of the bird sanctuary".

British Army personnel decorations, promotions, and officer commissions are gazetted in the London Gazette, the "Official Newspaper of Record for the United Kingdom". Due to all promotions appearing within the London Gazette an officer's promotion wasn't considered as official until their promotion appeared in the London Gazette; The officer would then be described as having been 'gazetted'. Within India, a 'gazetted officer' refers to the holder of a position within the Indian Administrative Services, or other government position, which has been declared by an official as a 'gazetted post'.

== See also ==
- Gazetteer
- List of British colonial gazettes
- List of English words of French origin
- List of government gazettes
