= Stationery Office =

Stationery Office may refer to:

- Office of Public Sector Information, an administrative office in the government of the United Kingdom
- The Stationery Office, a publishing company
