= Burney Collection of Newspapers =

Archive of English newspapers

The Burney Newspaper Collection is the most comprehensive collection of early English newspapers anywhere in the world. It contains nearly a million pages of news in about 1290 titles and it covers news from the 17th to the early 19th centuries. The core of the collection was gathered by Charles Burney. This was purchased by the British Museum Library in 1818. British Museum Library staff added volumes of early newspapers to the Burney collection for many years. The collection is now held by the British Library.

== Contents of the collection ==
The collection is an important source for contemporary reports of news, opinion, advertisements, book reviews, entertainment and performances for the seventeenth and eighteenth century period. This was a period in which the newspaper became a vital and integral part of life in Britain and elsewhere. The newspapers are predominantly London-based, but there are also newspapers from other English towns, Ireland, Scotland and a handful of rare newspapers from British colonies in the Americas and Asia.

=== Highlights ===
Key objects in the collection include:

- The financial scandal of the 1720s, the South Sea bubble, with reports in the Weekly Journal or Saturday’s Post of how Parliament decided that if they left the country, the directors of the South Sea company "shall suffer death as a felon without benefit of clergy and forfeit to the King all his Lands, Goods and Chattels whatsoever."
- First advertisement for The Memoirs of Fanny Hill in the Whitehall Evening Post, 6 March 1750, and then, in the issue of 17 March, a report of how the publisher was taken into custody and all copies were seized.
- Insight into English attitudes to contemporary events, such as when the English Chronicle, or, Universal Evening Post used the unusual device of a headline – FRENCH REVOLUTION!! – for a whole page article on 18 of July 1789. It reported sympathetically on the fall of the Bastille four days earlier, including how the officers were decapitated in ‘a sad but necessary spectacle...a solemnity worthy of the highest admiration.’

=== Summary ===
The collection begins with Parliamentary papers from 1603, and newspapers from the early 1620s. 18th-century London newspapers are the richest part of the collection.

The following is an incomplete list of titles covering some of the most popular.

- Parliamentary papers from 1603
- London Newspapers
  - The Daily Courant * (1702-1735), the first daily newspaper published in London
  - The London Gazette * from 1665
  - London Chronicle *
  - London Evening Post *
  - Lloyd's Evening Post and British Chronicle *
  - Evening Post *
  - Daily Post *
  - Morning Chronicle and London Advertiser *
- National papers
  - The Era
- Periodicals
  - Tatler (1709-1711)
  - Spectator (1711-1712)
- English provincial titles from 1712
  - The Stamford Mercury of 1728,
  - The Leeds Mercury *
  - The Exeter Flying Post *
- Irish newspapers from 1691
  - The Dublin Intelligence of 1691
  - The Belfast News–Letter *
- Scottish newspapers from 1708
  - The Aberdeen Journal *
  - The Caledonian Mercury *
  - The Echo or Edinburgh Weekly Journal *
- Many 18th-century American newspapers, including:
  - The New England Courant (1721-1723), on which Benjamin Franklin worked
- (unsorted in this list)
  - British Journal *
  - Daily Gazetteer *
  - General Advertiser *
  - Lounger *
  - Mirror *
  - St James' Chronicle or British Evening Post *
  - Whitehall Evening Post or London Intelligencer *
  - Daily News
  - Morning Chronicle
  - Illustrated Police News
  - The Chartist

* These items are available as part of the online collection.

== Preservation and access ==
=== Microfilm ===
Due to rapid deterioration of the collection, a decision was made to microfilm the collection and restrict access to physical copies. The success of the microfilm project led to many other book collections being preserved on film. The collection was digitised from microfilm in 2007 and online access to the collection is currently provided via the Gale Primary Sources Burney Newspapers Collection platform. This can be freely accessed in the British Library's reading rooms. Due to their fragility, the original physical volumes are now restricted.

== Access to the collection ==
- The Joint Information Systems Committee provides free online access to the collection for all UK Further and Higher Education institutions.

== See also ==
- History of British newspapers
- JISC Digitisation Programme
- List of online newspaper archives
- List of newspapers in the United Kingdom

== Sources ==
- Hartmut Walravens (2006), International newspaper librarianship for the 21st century, Walter de Gruyter, pp. 92–93, ISBN 978-3-598-21846-0
- Terras, Melissa M. (2008), Digital images for the information professional, Ashgate Publishing, Ltd., p. 114, ISBN 978-0-7546-4860-4
- Studer, Patrick (2008), Historical corpus stylistics: media, technology and change, Continuum International Publishing Group, p. 29, ISBN 978-0-8264-9430-6
