= Civil Service Yearbook =

The Civil Service Yearbook is an annual reference guide to the Civil Service and non-departmental public bodies.

The book was first published in 1972 and replaced the British Imperial Calendar. It was published annually by TSO until 2010 when the 47th Edition was published. An online version was made available starting with the 34th Edition in 1999.

Publication resumed in 2012 with the 48th Edition being published by Dandy Booksellers. The final print edition (54th Edition) was published in August 2018.
