= Lloyd's Evening Post =

British evening newspaper

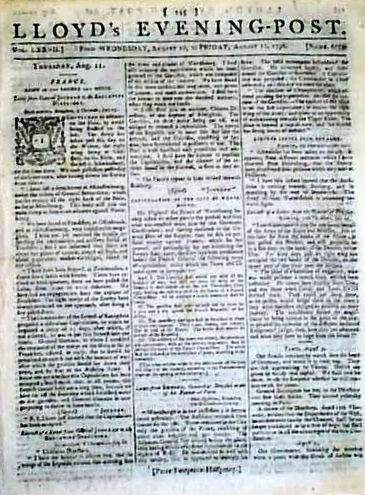
Lloyd's Evening Post front page, 10 August 1796

Lloyd's Evening Post, also known as The London Packet and Lloyd's Evening Post and British Chronicle, was a British evening newspaper published tri-weekly in London from 1757 to 1808. Founded shortly after the London Chronicle and similar in format, it came out on Monday, Wednesday and Friday, alternating in "friendly rivalry" with the London Chronicle which came out on Tuesday, Thursday, and Saturday.

== History ==
The Lloyd's Evening Post was founded in July 1757 by James Emonson (a former partner of William Bowyer), and was published from Emonson's printing office in St John's Square, Clerkenwell. According to the colophon of the July 14–16, 1762 edition, copies of the paper could be purchased from W. Nicoll in St. Paul's Church Yard, and letters to the editor and advertisements were accepted at Lloyd's Coffee House and at the publisher's.

John Rivington (1756–1785), a member of the Rivington publishing family, began working for Emonson in 1777 and took over the printing business when Emonson retired. Complicating matters somewhat was another tri-weekly, The London Packet, which was founded in 1771 and in 1777 changed its subtitle to "The New Lloyd's Evening Post". The Lloyd's Evening Post issue for June 8–10, 1778 announced that the newspaper would henceforth be published by Rivington at 59 Paternoster Row. From 1784 to 1790, the paper was published by J. Hancock at 23 Paternoster Row. It was subsequently published by Thomas Spilsbury and Son at 57 Snowhill. The Spilsbury family remained its publishers until the paper's demise in 1808. For a few months in 1805, the Scottish writer Robert Heron served as the paper's editor. He had hoped to buy a share in it as well, but his perpetual financial difficulties made that impossible. Heron died penniless two years later in the fever ward of the St Pancras Workhouse.

In the first decade of the 19th century, the rise of daily newspapers had led not only to the end of Lloyd's Evening Post but also several other tri-weekly publications such as the London Evening Post, the Evening Post, and the short-lived Inquisitor (published by John Browne Bell, the son of the literary publisher John Bell). The London Chronicle, which by 1801 was selling twice as many copies as Lloyd's Evening Post (as indicated by the amount of stamp duty the papers paid), managed to hang on until 1823.

== Library collections ==
The Burney Collection of Newspapers at the British Library has digitized copies of the paper from 1757 to 1805. The Guildhall Library holds the complete run to 1808 either in print or on microfilm.
