= Edinburgh Courant =

18th-century newspaper in Edinburgh, Scotland (UK)

The Edinburgh Courant was a broadsheet newspaper from the 18th century. It was published out of Edinburgh, Midlothian, Scotland. Its first issue was dated 14–19 February 1705 and was sold for a penny. It was Scotland's first regional newspaper and it was produced twice weekly for five years, thereafter continuing as the Scots Courant until April 1720.

== History ==
The paper was first printed in 1705 by James Watson printer but only 55 copies were issued. In 1706 it briefly continued under the name "Scots Courant" before becoming dormant.

In 1718, the Edinburgh Evening Courant began publication, as an evening newspaper, being first printed by James MacEwan, or McQueen or McEwen on the High street section of the Royal Mile, published three times per week as a Whig publication in opposition to the Jacobite paper the Caledonian Mercury. passing to his protege, Alexander Kincaid in 1735. It survived until the Edinburgh Evening News came into existence in 1873.

It was founded by James Watson (who had also published the Edinburgh Gazette from 1700) and had its main printing office was at Craigs Close at 170 High Street on the Royal Mile, the premises generally being known as the King's Printing House.

In 1725, during the time of the Scottish Malt Tax riots, rival political factions used – or at least attempted to use – newspapers including the Edinburgh Evening Courant and the Caledonian Mercury as their "mouthpieces", as a letter from the then book trade apprentice Andrew Millar indicates. Millar was apprenticed to James McEuen, who had been printer, editor, and principal bookseller of the The Edinburgh Evening Courant since 1718.

Like other Scottish newspapers of the period, the Edinburgh Evening Courant published advertisements offering rewards for the return of runaway slaves that had been brought to Scotland, since slavery was still assumed to be legal on Scottish soil. An advertisement placed in the Edinburgh Evening Courant on 13 February 1727 stated that:

Run away on the 7th instant from Dr Gustavus Brown’s Lodgings in Glasgow, a Negro Woman, named Ann, being about 18 Years of Age, with a green Gown and a Brass Collar about her Neck, on which are engraved these words [“Gustavus Brown in Dalkieth his Negro, 1726.”] Whoever apprehends her, so as she may be recovered, shall have two Guineas Reward, and necessary Charges allowed by Laurence Dinwiddie Junior Merchant in Glasgow, or by James Mitchelson Jeweller in Edinburgh.

== Editors ==
Daniel Defoe, author of the 1719 novel Robinson Crusoe, and then based at Moubray House, was its editor in the early 18th century. James Hannay, Naval History writer, was its editor from 1860 to 1864.

== Archives ==
Images of the newspaper for two years (1750 and 1884) have been digitalized and can be viewed through Find my Past and Ancestry.com, respectively with a subscription. Microfiche copies of all surviving copies are available for inspection free of charge at the Edinburgh City Library (by appointment).
