= James Watson (printer) =

Scottish printer and bookseller (c1664–1722)

James Watson (c. 1664 – 1722) was a Scottish printer, bookseller and founder of several Scottish newspapers, coming from a long line of printers. Unafraid of controversy in his printing he was in court multiple times and imprisoned at least once.

Watson's collection of ancient poetry, the Choice Collection of Comic and Serious Scottish Poems (1706), helped to launch Scotland's eighteenth century Scots Vernacular Revival, influencing Allan Ramsay, Robert Fergusson, Robert Burns and Walter Scott.

Watson's History of Printing (1713) is also seen as a milestone in printing history.

== James Watson senior ==
James’ father, also James Watson was a merchant turned printer in Aberdeen. He had met and married his Dutch wife whilst on a trade visit to Holland. Her family was clearly of considerable wealth as records state that her father loaned money to Charles II during his exile to Holland. Although it is recorded that this debt was never truly repaid it gave leverage to the father in his obtaining of some degree of monopoly to printing in Scotland (despite existing patents being in place in favour of Andrew Anderson). However, on the King's reinstatement this allowed a mutual benefit in permitting the King to have a pro-Catholic printer at his disposal, and Watson was installed at Holyrood Palace to print from there (probably also having accommodation on site for his whole family). James was given a 40-year monopoly on royal printing in 1671 (but did not live to its conclusion).

James (senior) is often referred to as Papish Watson or The Popish Printer. His most noted publication of non-political alignment is probably The Hind and the Panther, John Dryden’s major poem, printed at Holyrood Palace in 1687. His most noted print directly related to the royal self-projection was Prognostications by King James II (VII of Scotland).

He had a salary of £1001 per year (paid direct by the king) and died in 1687.

== Life of James Watson the younger ==
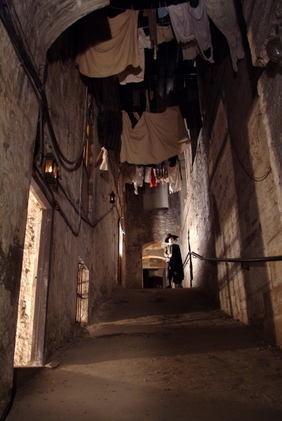
Mary King's Close where Watson had his first printworks

He was born in Aberdeen around 1664 and educated at Aberdeen High School and Aberdeen University.

He moved with his family to Edinburgh in 1685. He appears to have largely filled his father's shoes following his death in 1687 but disappears from records, probably going to Holland to train further and gather more sophisticated presses and modern typefaces. Curiously, the Edinburgh Privy Council had issued an edict in 1687 preventing printers printing without a license (for each specific work), but specifically exempted James Watson from this requirement. This may have been a diktat imposed upon the council by the monarch, given Watson's connections.

Watson had inherited two printworks on the Royal Mile whom his father had lent large sums to Dutch men which had not been repaid. From 1694 he reappears using one of these properties: a small printworks on Mary King's Close. In 1695 he moved to a printworks on Warriston Close and then again to a printworks on Craigs Close: presumably the larger of the two premises which he already owned. The final premises is referred to in documents as The Kings Printing House.

Probably wishing to distance himself from his father's known Catholic sympathies he publicly renounced Catholicism, thus allowing himself more public freedoms. Officially he was Episcopalian rather than Presbyterian. In reality he was at best an agnostic but continued to have clear Catholic sympathies in much of his printing. It was noted that on Royal Proclamations (which should have been his duty to publish) he picked which ones suited his own viewpoints, such that these were often privately published for the Edinburgh area. Rivals (including Anderson's widow) frequently accused him of Papish and Jacobite sympathies. His early work though concentrated on medical and school textbooks and legal work. He had also tried printing the Bible but ended up in court due to the legal restrictions limiting who was allowed to publish these.

His most memorable act was the publishing of a pamphlet criticising the government during the Darien expedition scandal in 1700. Whilst the co-accused, Hugh Paterson (a surgeon-apothecary also owning a printworks) was the printer of the more famous of the three problematic pamphlets created, Scotland's Grievances Relating to Darien, Watson wrote and printed a shorter version of this The People of Scotland's Groans and Lamentable Complaints made up of Extracts from Scotland's Grievances. Watson's pamphlet also included inflammatory remarks regarding the king not being the legitimate king, which would have further angered authorities. Both men were called to appear before court early in June 1700 and held at the Tolbooth but then released on bail. The court heard their petitions on 13 June 1700. Watson pleaded that his actions were caused by his "numerous family" and "poor circumstances" which had forced him to print for financial reward. The court, led by Sir James Stewart, did not accept this and set as date for later trial. The two men were officially imprisoned in the Tolbooth awaiting the judgement. Meanwhile, events at Darien led the public to riot and sympathises ran high with Watson and Paterson. On 20 June a crowd surrounded the Lord Advocates house and forced him to write a warrant for the men's release, which he did. This action was overtaken by other events. Four men broke into the Tolbooth and forced (using a dagger or bayonet) the guards to release Watson and Paterson (plus other prisoners on minor charges).

Watson and Paterson were re-arrested on 25 June 1700. Watson employed John Spottiswoode as his counsel but gave no defence. The much-irritated judge found them guilty on the charge of seditious literature and sentenced each to banishment from the city (for a radius of ten miles) for a period of one year and a day. Infringement of this ban brought a fine of £10 per occurrence. The four men who released them from the Tolbooth were found guilty on various charges on 22 July 1700 and ironically found themselves behind bars in the Tolbooth.

Watson observed the ban and moved to the Gorbals in south Glasgow. Watson petitioned the court in March 1701 for an early return to protect the financial interests of his business. His exact return is not recorded but thereafter he appears to have focussed upon newspaper production rather than pamphlets. From 1701 to 1716 he is recorded in a series of legal disputes with Mrs Agnes Campbell, widow of his rival pamphleteer printer, Andrew Anderson, who was the only authorised printer of pamphlets and Bibles in Edinburgh, but Watson appears to have continually ignored this monopoly. However, his printing interests began drifting to newspapers, which were less rigidly controlled. He had earlier (1699) set up the initial publishing of the Edinburgh Gazette which ran only 41 issues before a dispute with its editor, but his experience led to his self-creation of the Edinburgh Courant published thrice weekly from 19 February 1705. He also began a series of other newspapers and journals.

In 1704 Watson is recorded as meeting with Evander MacIver and George Ker, both papermakers, regarding general improvements to production quality. From 1706 he begins using more contemporary typefaces in an attempt to modernise the Scottish printing industry.

In 1706 he collected and published the hugely popular Choice Collection of Comic and Serious Scottish Poems, of later influence on Ramsay, Fergusson, Scott and Burns. His growing success led him to open a bookshop (independent of his printworks) next to the Red Lion Tavern on the Royal Mile near St Giles Cathedral.

In 1711 his business acquired a new legitimacy, being granted a Royal Patent by Queen Anne allowing him to publish major controlled items such as Bibles. One result of this was his Crown Bible of 1715, published in 8 volumes after several years of work and described as “a matchless beauty”. He published the Works of George Mackenzie of Rosehaugh between 1716 and 1720.

He died on 22 September 1722 and was buried in Greyfriars Kirkyard. His estate following death was £32,000, the equivalent of a modern-day multi-millionaire. This entire sum fell to his second wife.

== Family ==
James had a brother, Patrick Watson, also a printer, apprenticed to George Mosman, printer in Edinburgh. Patrick ended in court accused of stealing tools and type-face to pass to James in 1698. This was found not proven but continuation of the apprenticeship proved impossible and the sum paid for this to Mosman (£100) had to be repaid. In 1700 an Alexander Watson, printer is noted, burying his child at Greyfriars Kirkyard, and may also be related.

Watson's son, again James Watson, attended the High School in Edinburgh and Edinburgh University and was then sent abroad to study printing (again probably Holland), however he died in his youth and did not follow in his father's footsteps.

== Newspapers ==
- Edinburgh Gazette (1699)
- Edinburgh Courant (1705)
- The Paris Gazette (1706)
- The Scots Postman (1708)
- Scots Courant (1710-1720)

== Other publications ==
- An Essay Against the Transportation and Selling of Men to the Plantations of Foreigners (1699) an early anti-slavery pamphlet released in partial print of 25 pages due to suppression by the government (printed at Warriston Close, Edinburgh)
- History of the Learned (1699)
- Act Book of the Barony of Gorbals by Robert Renwick (1701) printed in the Gorbals
- The Song of Solomon (1701) printed in the Gorbals
- Choice Collection of Comic and Serious Scottish Poems (1706)
- Choice Collection of Comic and Serious Scottish Poems vol.2 (1709)
- Choice Collection of Comic and Serious Scottish Poems vol.3 (1711)
- Steele’s Tatler (1710)
- The Examiner (1710)
- Tatler (1711) under licence from Hepburn of Bearford in England
- History of Printing (1713)
- Crown Bible (1715) (the matchless beauty)
- Rules and Directions to be Observed in Printing-Houses (1721)
- Bible, in King James Version (1722) a highly acclaimed print now of great value
