= Williams Lea =

British outsourcing company

- Type: Subsidiary
- Industry: Business support, creative and marketing services, backoffice transformation solutions and workplace and office services.
- Founded: 1820
- Headquarters: Chicago, US
- Key people: Kiran Shankar (president)
- Services: High volume pitchbooks and presentations, creative and marketing services, intelligent document processing, digital mail and mailroom services, legal e-billing and office services
- Number of employees: 15,000+ (2026)
- Parent: RR Donnelley
- Subsidiaries: The Stationery Office
- Website: www.williamslea.com

Williams Lea, is a subsidiary of RR Donnelley that offers tech-enabled business process outsourcing (BPO) to companies. Founded in 1820 as a company providing printing services to the financial industry, Williams Lea went through a number of changes to its business model and now provides services including presentations and creative services, business and administrative support, and office services.

== History ==
Williams Lea was founded in 1820 by John Wertheimer, who opened a printing business in London.

Williams Lea has grown through a combination of organic growth and acquisitions:

- In October 2004, it acquired US-based Bowne Business Solutions, a long-term joint venture partner, from Bowne & Co. for $190.8 million.
- In August 2005, it acquired US-based Uniscribe for $36.1 million and Australia-based Creatis for $7.7 million.
- In November 2006, it acquired UK-based The Stationery Office for £130 million.
- In November 2007, Deutsche Post, Williams Lea's owner, acquired legal process outsourcing (LPO) company Centric LPO for an undisclosed sum.
- In July 2011, Williams Lea purchased the design and production agency Tag Worldwide for an undisclosed sum.
- In June 2023, Tag was sold to by Japanese marketing giant Dentsu Group Inc.

The company's ownership has changed several times over the past twenty years:

- In 2006, Deutsche Post acquired a majority stake in Williams Lea in a transaction valuing the company at approximately £450 million.
- In 2017, Williams Lea Tag was acquired from Deutsche Post by Advent International, a private equity firm.
- In January 2025, Williams Lea was acquired by RR Donnelley.

== Scams ==
Williams Lea has been cited as the commissioning organisation in a series of scams aimed at editors and translators. Victims receive an email from an individual (or bot) claiming to represent Williams Lea and offering work. Typically, this might be to translate or edit an academic text. This is not authorised by Williams Lea, which is being used as a front for the scam. The work involved has not been authorised by the copyright holder of the text mentioned and is not a genuine work offer.
