= London Chronicle =

Family newspaper of Georgian London

The London Chronicle
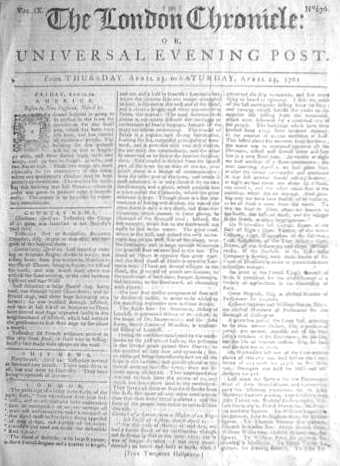
- London Chronicle, 1761
- Type: Thrice-a-week
- Founded: 1756
- Ceased publication: 1823
- Political alignment: Loyalist
- City: London

The London Chronicle was an early family newspaper of Georgian London. It was a thrice-a-week evening paper, introduced in 1756, and contained world and national news, and coverage of artistic, literary, and theatrical events in the capital.

A typical issue was eight pages, quarto size. Many of the stories were copied from government reports published in the official London Gazette. Copying from other newspapers was rife, and many reports were in the form of letters from so-called gentlemen.

Originally titled The London Chronicle: or, Universal Evening Post it first ran from 1757 to June 1765. It was continued by The London Chronicle which appeared in 113 volumes from 2 July 1765 to 23 April 1823. It was then absorbed by the Commercial chronicle and continued in its original title (London chronicle: or, Universal evening post). In 1823 it was absorbed into the London Packet.

This newspaper was one of the first to break the news that the United States had declared independence from the British Empire, reporting on the event in its 13 August 1776 edition. It was also one of the first to publish the declaration in its entirety, in the 15–17 August 1776 edition, but containing no explanation or comment as to what it was.

== Archives ==
- Vol. 1. 1 January – 30 June 1757
- Vol. 2. 30 June – 31 December 1757
- Vol. 4. 30 June – 31 December 1758
- Vol. 5. 1 January – 30 June 1759
- Vol. 6. 1 July – 31 December 1759.
- Vol. 8. 1 July – 31 December 1760
- Vol. 9. 1 January – 30 June 1761
- Vol 10. 1 July – 31 December 1761
- Vol. 11. 1 January – 30 June 1762
- Vol. 12. 30 June – 31 December 1762
- Vol. 13. 1 January – 30 June 1763
- Vol. 14. 1 July – 31 December 1763
- Vol. 33. 31 December 1772 – 29 June 1773
- Vol. 71. 2 January – 29 December 1792
- Vol. 82. 29 June – 30 December 1797
- Vol. 85. 29 December 1798 – 29 June 1799
- Vol. 87. 31 December 1799 – 28 June 1800
- Vol. 105. 1 January – 30 June 1809
- Vol. 106. 1 July – 31 December 1809
- Vol. 107. 1 January – 30 June 1810
- Vol. 108. 1 July – 31 December 1810
- Vol. 109. 1 January – 30 June 1811
- Vol. 110. 1 July – 31 December 1811
- Vol. 111. 1 January – 30 June 1812
- Vol. 112. 1 July – 31 December 1812
- Vol. 113. 1 January – 30 June 1813
- Vol. 114 30 June 1813-1 January 1814
