= Tony Hirst (blogger) =

Academic

Tony Hirst is a British academic at the Open University, in the Department of Computing and Communications. He is known for the OUseful Blog on practical applications of open data.

== Contributions ==
In February 2009, Hirst and colleague Joss Winn, established WriteToReply, to re-publish the UK Government's Digital Britain Interim Report in a way that allowed readers to comment on each paragraph. This was among a number of experiments to promote greater online public participation in government consultations.

In March 2009, Hirst created a technique for extracting and presenting subtitles generated from Twitter status updates in SubRip (*.srt) format

Hirst won the 2011 "OpenUp" contest for his ideas about the use of UCAS data. The OpenUp contest was run by TSO (formerly "The Stationery Office", a publishing company that supplies the UK Government) and came with a £50,000 development fund to enable the idea. Hirst was chosen by a judging panel headed up by TSO director of digital products Robin Brattel, and included artificial intelligence expert Sir Nigel Richard Shadbolt and Open University director of communications Lucian J Hudson.

Hirst was described as "brilliant" by The Guardian data blog for his work analysing the use of Twitter by journalists.

== Media work ==
Hirst has been an academic adviser and expert contributor to the BBC World Service programme Click, formerly Digital Planet.

He was co-founder of the Open University Robotics Outreach Group, which led to the Blue Peter/RoboFesta Competition in 2001. This competition - which required children to "Design a Really Useful Robot" - had 32,000 entries.
