= Mitchell's Press Directories =

19th-century British periodical

First published in 1846, Mitchell's Press Directories listed newspaper titles with additional information about their geographical and topical coverage. The Directories have been described as 'an annual that blended commentary with factual detail'. Press directories such as Mitchell's provide important evidence for the history of mass media in the United Kingdom, in particular the history of British newspapers.

Charles Mitchell (1807–1859) acted as advertising agent for London and provincial newspapers. Mitchell & Co., founded in 1837, is described as 'one of the earliest advertising agencies'. His goal in publishing the Directories was 'to form a guide to advertisers in their selection of journals as mediums more particularly suitable for their announcements', and as a 'more dignified and permanent record' of British newspapers. He published the first Directory in 1846, then 1847, 1851, 1854, and annually from 1856. After Mitchell's death in 1859, his step-son, Walter Wellsman, become editor and expanded the scope of the Directory. From 1860, the Directories included both periodicals and newspapers. By 1861 Mitchell's Newspaper Press Directory was so comprehensive that the British Post Office regarded it as an authoritative list of London and provincial newspapers.

== Content ==
As described in the first edition, for each newspaper published in 'Great Britain and Ireland and the British Isles', Mitchell aimed to list the 'leading features connected with the population, manufactures, trade, &c., of each newspaper district':

1. 'Title, price, day and place of publication of each newspaper.
2. Its politics.
3. The date of its establishment.
4. The principal towns in what is considered its more especial local district.
5. The particular interest it advocates, whether agricultural, commercial, or manufacturing; whether it is more especially a political, religious, or literary journal; whether it is attached to the Church of England, or is the organ of any sect of Dissenters.
6. The names of the proprietors and publisher.
7. And whether the bookselling, stationery, or any business is carried on at the office'.

Sometimes this included a short summary of history of the paper, and comments on its 'style and contents'.

Originally their geographical coverage was the British Isles, but by 1891 his Directories were international in scope, listing titles from 'Algeria, Pondicherry, Senegal, the French provinces, and many other locales'. From 1885 to 1888 Mitchell's published a directory of 'Continental, American and Colonial Papers'.

== Impact ==
In recent years, the Directories have become an important source of information for scholars studying the British press in the nineteenth and early twentieth centuries.
