= Robin Brattel =

British businessman

Robin Thomas Brattel
- Occupations: Technology and publishing entrepreneur
- Organization(s): WeGoDo Inc. & Ltd.
- Known for: Founder of WeGoDo Inc & Ltd., Inapub Ltd. and Eventility Ltd.
- Website: wegodo.com inapub.co.uk

Robin Thomas Brattel is a technology and publishing entrepreneur from the UK, known for being the founder of Inapub Ltd., Joinin (Eventility) Ltd. and WeGoDo Inc. & Ltd.

== Early Career and TSO ==
Brattel was the Director of Digital for The Stationery Office (TSO), a UK publisher that produces print and digital publications for government agencies and departments, as well as for companies in the private sector. In 2011 Brattel was invited to lead the judging panel for the TSO OpenUp contest run by TSO as a part of their championing the use of transparent data. The contest awarded money for innovative ideas on opening data to benefit the public. Included on the judging panel for the inaugural award were artificial intelligence expert Sir Nigel Richard Shadbolt and Open University director of communications Lucian J Hudson. The panel awarded the prize to OUseful blogger Tony Hirst for his ideas about the use of UCAS data.

Prior to TSO, he worked for various companies as a website consultant and as the head of online for a dot com startup. As an independent web developer, he also audited Guidelines for UK Government Websites – Illustrated Handbook for Web Management Teams, the UK Government's official web guidelines document.

== WeGoDo ==
In September 2014, Brattel founded WeGoDo Inc and WeGoDo Ltd, a business whose focus is to help connect people who share the same interests so that they can do more of what they love to do. WeGoDo was shortlisted for the Alpha Summit part of the Dublin Web Summit 2014 event in Dublin, Ireland. The mobile first solution was scheduled to roll out in spring 2015.

== Inapub ==
In 2009, Brattel founded Inapub, a site the helps people find pubs in the UK, and allows pub owners to reach customers through digital marketing and social networking tools. Inapub also organises events to co-ordinate the efforts of pubs to raise funds for charity or recognise significant dates. In 2010, Inapub launched a mobile app that allowed users to search for pubs based on their locations and services offered. In 2011, the company teamed up with UK publisher Archant to produce Inapub, a monthly trade magazine for pub owners. In 2012, Inapub was shortlisted for launch of the year from the British Society of Magazine Editors. Brattel also does business presentations, advising pub owners on ways they can use the web and social networking to improve their businesses.

== Joinin/Eventility ==
In 2011, Brattel founded Joinin/Eventility, a site that helped organisations, events and venues promote events. Oriented toward groups of all sizes, Eventility seeks to grant public organisations and private business with access to organizational tools that allow them to create and promote events. In 2012, the site added features that allows groups to collect registration fees from participants via PayPal. Eventility became Joinin.com before being shut down in October 2014 with users being directed to WeGoDo.com.

== Iotic ==
Robin Brattel is the CEO of the digital software company Iotic, which secured an investment of £6.5 million in 2019. The funding round was led by the companies IQ Capital, Talis Capital and Breed Reply.

== Affiliations and public speaking ==
Brattel is a member of the Collaborative Strategies Network, an organisation founded in 2009 by Lucian J. Hudson that employs a group of experts to promote collaboration within and between nations, sectors, disciplines and organisations. In 2010, he was part of a group of technology professionals who founded TechHub, a site that provides physical and virtual spaces for tech entrepreneurs to meet, work together and exchange ideas. He also speaks regularly at events on the topics of open data, entrepreneurship and using digital solutions for the promotion of events, organisations and businesses.
