= John Wertheimer =

English printer

- Born: 1799; London, Great Britain
- Died: 18 December 1883 (aged 83–84); London, United Kingdom
- Occupation: Printer

John Wertheimer (1799 – 18 December 1883) was an English printer. He was senior member of the firm of Wertheimer, Lea & Co, having founded the company in 1820 and now operating as Williams Lea Tag.

From 1820 until his death he was actively engaged as a printer in London; and many important educational, medical, and philological works were issued from his press. His firm printed most of the works needing Hebrew type, also commercial reports and The Jewish Chronicle. He also printed The Voice of Jacob, the first Anglo-Jewish Newspaper.
