= Norwich Post =

English provincial newspaper

- Type: Weekly newspaper
- Founder: 1701
- Founded: Francis Burges
- Ceased publication: 1713
- Language: English
- City: Norwich, England

The Norwich Post was an English provincial newspaper which was established in 1701 by Francis Burges. Publication was continued by his widow Elizabeth from 1706 until her death in 1709. It is the earliest truly provincial English newspaper. A weekly edition was established from November 1707. The newspaper continued until 1713, when it was superseded by the Norwich Courant.

== History ==
The Norwich Post was an English provincial newspaper which existed between 1701 and 1713. It is believed to be the earliest truly provincial English newspaper, although the London Gazette was briefly published in Oxford in 1665.

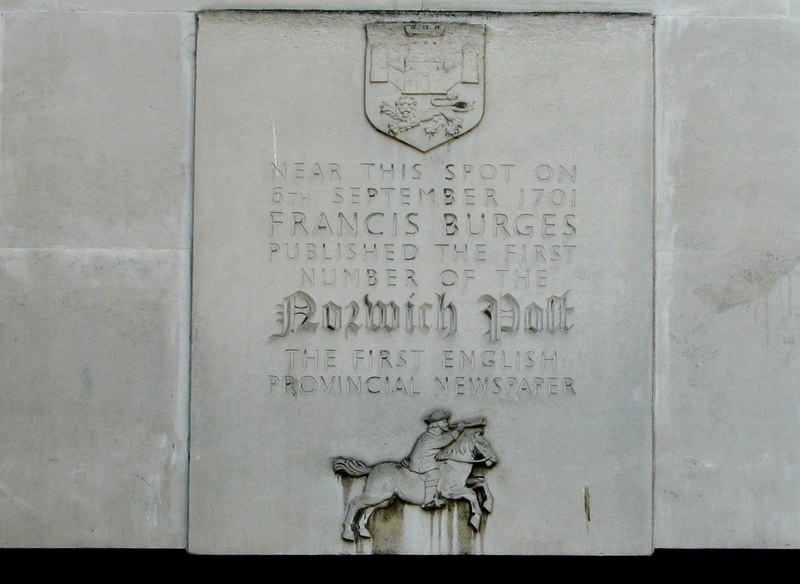
Commemorative stone marking the first publication of the Norwich Post

The printer Francis Burges set up a printing press at the Red Well in Norwich during the summer of 1701. The earliest surviving copy of the newspaper dates from 1707, but he appears to have established a weekly edition from early November of that year.

After Burges died in November 1706, his widow Elizabeth continued the business, despite commercial competition from two newly-established newspapers, the Norwich Postman (established in December 1706) and the Norwich Gazette (established in January 1707). After her death in November 1709, ownership of the newspaper reverted to Francis Burges's former master, the printer Freeman Collins of London. Collins sent his most trusted apprentices and family members to Norwich to print the newspaper. These included Edward Cave, later the founder of the Gentleman's Magazine.

The newspaper continued until Collin's death in 1713, and thereafter it was superseded by the Norwich Courant.

== Sources ==
- Stoker, David (2000). "Printing at the Red Well: an early Norwich press through the eyes of contemporaries" (PDF). The Mighty Engine: The Printing Press and Its Impact. Winchester, UK: St Paul's Bibliographies: 97–106.
- Wiles, R.M. (1965). Freshest Advices: Early Printed Newspapers in England. Ohio State University Press. OCLC 1035153575.
