= Mercurius Caledonius =

Newspaper

The Mercurius Caledonius - Comprising The Affairs now in Agitation in Scotland With A Survey of Forraign Intelligence was arguably Scotland's first newspaper. It was founded in Edinburgh in 1660 by the playwright Thomas Sydserf, the son of the Bishop of Galloway. It contained domestic news such as reports of parliamentary debates, reports from abroad and reprints of news from London newspapers.

Twelve editions were published between 1660 and 1661, the first having the date "From Monday Decemb. 31 to Tuesday, Jan. 8th, 1661".

According to Francis Groome, Mercurius Caledonius was preceded by The Scots Intelligencer (1643, AKA The Kingdom's Intelligencer) and Mercurius Publicus (1652).

== See also ==
- Caledonian Mercury
