= JISC Digitisation Programme =

Series of projects digitising cultural and scholarly materials in the UK

The JISC Digitisation Programme was a series of projects to digitise the cultural heritage and scholarly materials in universities, libraries, museums, archives, and other cultural memory organizations in the United Kingdom, from 2004 to 2010 The program was managed by the UK's Joint Information Systems Committee, the body that supports United Kingdom post-16 and higher education and research in support of learning, teaching, research and administration in the context of ICT.

The Programme had three main strands.

- Phase 1 ran from 2004 to 2007 and funded six separate digitization projects.
- Phase 2 ran from 2007 to 2009 and funded sixteen projects.
- Enriching Digital Resources ran from 2008 to 2010 and funded twenty-five projects.

== Phase 1 (2004-2007) ==
The six projects funded under Phase 1 were the following

NewsFilm Online

This project digitised 3,000 hours from the archives of ITN (Independent Television News), featuring clips relating to British and world news from the 1920s to the present day. These included, for example, interviews with Nelson Mandela. The video content was only available to Higher and Further Education institutions in the United Kingdom and required access via the Athens or Shibboleth authentication systems.

Online Historical Population Reports

The University of Essex has made available population reports from the UK, 1801 - 1937. The reports, drawn from census and other related information, include information on births, deaths, marriages, housing, religion, and other social factors relating to the UK population. The resource is freely available.

Medical Journals Backfiles

The Wellcome Trust led this project to publish electronic versions of 2m pages of text from medical journals.

18th-Century Parliamentary Papers

Led by the University of Southampton, this project digitized eighteenth-century parliamentary papers bills and related journals from the House of Commons. The resource is freely available to staff and students in UK further and higher education, plus those working in Irish universities.

Archival Sound Recordings

This project (which has received two sections of funding from JISC) has made available some of the Sound Archive of the British Library, including oral histories from the Holocaust, wildlife recordings, and accents and dialects. Some of the content is freely available, others are only open to Further and Higher Education in the UK, depending on copyright and data protection restrictions.

British Library Historic Newspapers

The British Library received two tranches of funding from JISC to digitise nearly 3m pages of historic newspapers, largely covering the nineteenth century.

== Phase 2 (2007-2009) ==
The sixteen projects funded under Phase 2 were the following

19th Century Pamphlets Online

This project is providing online access to collections of 19th-century pamphlets held in UK research libraries. Over 26,000 paper copy pamphlets, which focus on the political, economic, and social issues that fuelled the great Parliamentary debates and controversies of the 19th century, have been digitised. The project was led by the University of Southampton, on behalf of a consortium of seven UK universities. The digitised material is being delivered via the JSTOR service. The content is free to UK universities and colleges.

A digital library of core e-resources on Ireland

Led by Queen's University Belfast, this project has digitised backfiles from over 70 journals in Irish studies, including The Journal of the Royal Society of Antiquaries of Ireland and various sections from the Proceedings of the Royal Irish Academy. The content is free to UK and Irish universities and colleges.

Archival Sound Recordings 2

Archival Sound Recordings is a continuation of the original JISC-funded project. It provides further online access to selections of spoken word, music and environmental recordings from the British Library Sound Archive. Some of the highlights included several early recordings of the music of composers such as Chopin, Bach, Beethoven, Mozart and Brahms.

British Cartoon Archive digitisation project

This project has made available political cartoons from 20th-century UK newspapers, including the Carl Giles Archive. The resources is freely available on the web.

British Newspapers 1620-1900

The British Library had already digitised two separate collections of newspapers: British newspapers 1800–1900 and the Burney collection of British 18th-century newspapers. This project added another 1m pages of historical newspapers to the platform.

UK Cabinet Papers, 1915-1977

The UK's National Archive has digitised the Cabinet Papers from 1915 and 1977 (with new material for later years being added once it becomes available). It has opened up access to primary source material on the outbreak and events of the first and second world wars, the post-war division of Europe, the creation of the welfare state and the end of empire. It is freely available to all - there are additional tools for A-Level school pupils in the UK.

Digitisation of the Independent Radio News Archive

This project focuses on over 3,000 hours of radio recordings relating to news and current affairs, taken from independent radio broadcasters in the UK. The material digitised includes recordings of a wide range of broadcasts including coverage of the Falklands war, the miners' strike, Northern Ireland and the whole of the Thatcher period of government.

The East London Theatre Archive

This project facilitates research into East London theatres and their history by making their archives freely available to researchers and students with an academic interest in charting the influence of the area's contribution to theatre today.

First World War Poetry Digital Archive

Building on Oxford's Wilfred Owen archive, this multimedia digital archive contains images, text, audio and video of primary material from five other major British poets of the First World War. The collection brings together material, currently dispersed across the UK and the US, on the poets Edward Thomas, Robert Graves, Isaac Rosenberg, Roland Leighton.

Freeze Frame – historic polar images

This project has developed a repository of freely available visual and textual resources to support learning, teaching and research into topics relating to the history of Arctic and Antarctic exploration and science. It provides access to hidden collections for use at all educational levels.

Historic Boundaries of Britain

The Vision of Britain holds information on towns, places and regions in the UK, and users can find which historical constituencies covered a location by typing a postcode or clicking on a map.

InView: Moving images in the public sphere

The project delivered 600 hours of unique moving image materials and digitised contextual documents to educational communities and the public across the UK. It pursued a curated and thematic approach; demonstrating how the key social, political and economic issues of our time have been represented, illustrated, expressed and debated through moving image media forms. One example of British broadcast television which was made available online through InView was the celebrated Channel 4 discussion programme After Dark.

The John Johnson Collection: An archive of printed ephemera

The John Johnson collection is a collection of printed ephemera. Containing 1.5 million items ranging in date from 1508 to 1939, it spans the entire range of printing and social history. Drawn from the Bodleian Library at the University of Oxford, it contains a high proportion of unique material which up until now has largely remained hidden to researchers.

The John Johnson Collection is available free of charge to all UK universities, further education institutions, schools and public libraries.

Pre-Raphaelite Online Resource

The project has digitised Birmingham Museums & Art Gallery's (BM&AG) entire Pre-Raphaelite collection, including painting on canvas, works on paper, sculpture, designs for stained glass, textiles, tiles, printed books, unpublished artists’ and associates’ letters, notebooks relating to major patrons of the BM&AG collection, and associated photographic material.

It has created over 3,000 files with new metadata and over 3,000 high quality images. Including the work of artists such as: Edward Burne-Jones, Ford Madox Brown, John Everett Millais, Dante Gabriel Rossetti, William Holman Hunt, Arthur Hughes, Frederick Sandys, Simeon Solomon.

UK Theses Digitisation Project

Under this project, nearly 10,000 digitised theses are now freely available as open access, enabling all researchers regardless of location or time to search for, identify and order digitised UK theses.

Welsh Journals Online

All academically significant Welsh periodicals published since 1900 are being digitised by the National Library of Wales, to provide a substantial corpus of material in the Welsh language freely available online to readers in all parts of the world.

== Enriching Digital Resources (2008-2009) ==
The twenty-five projects funded under Enriching Digital Resources Programme were the following:

Anglo-Saxon Cluster

Developed at King's College London, the Anglo-Saxon Cluster (ASC) brings together various online resources relating to Anglo-Saxon society.

Automatic Biodiversity Literature Enhancement (ABLE)

The aim of the project was to establish and extend information extraction techniques from scanned taxonomic literature in the Biodiversity Heritage Library. Scanned texts contain errors introduced by imperfect Optical Character Recognition (OCR) and other sources, so techniques are required that are robust in the face of such errors.

Climbié Inquiry Data Corpus Online

This is an archive of transcriptions of the examination of witnesses regarding the murder of Victoria Climbié in February 2000. This project has taken this large data set and made it available via the University of Huddersfield digital library.

Creating Heritage Artefacts for Research and Teaching in an e-Repository (CHARTER)

This project was a small-scale digitisation pilot, delivering an open-access repository (based on DSpace software) populated with a critical mass of 4,000 digital images drawn from resources in the Special Collections of the University of Exeter. The research collection includes over 2,000 images showcasing Victorian culture.

Digitisation of Countryside Images

The project has created digitised images of 13,000 glass plate negatives from the British magazine 'Farmer and Stockbreeder' and 'Farmers Weekly' photographic archive, dating from 1920 to 1965. These images have been catalogued and made available via the Museum of English Rural Life's website.

East London Lives a Digital Archive of 'London 2012'

Beginning with interviews done in 2009, this archive has helped capture the feelings, aspirations and hopes of the communities of East London as they confront the reality of hosting the Olympics in 2012. The archive also contains academic research and contextual information from research teams working at University of East London.

Enhancing Stained Glass Studies

The Corpus Vitrearum Medii Aevi (CVMA) website provides access to 17,000 images of stained glass in British buildings and collections. This project has delivered enhanced metadata, an improved public interface, and a facility to create and manage user-generated content.

Enhancing the VADS Image Collection

This project has enhanced the VADS (Visual Arts Data Service) Image Collection, which holds over 130,000 images, freely available for educational use. The project developed mechanisms to automatically share data for teaching and research, improving the academic user experience, and facilitating greater academic use by giving users the ability to curate, annotate and publish their own image sets, thus stimulating use of the collection in new and potentially rejuvenating ways.

Enlightening Science: Teaching and Learning Newtonianism in the 18th and 21st Centuries

This project has created a series of tools that both general and expert users to understand the central concepts of Newton's his scientific achievements. This includes textual and audio introductions to freely available transcriptions of his most influential scientific texts, and also by employing video recreations of 18th century lecture courses in which doctrines were explicated for both 18th century genteel and academic audiences.

Enriching the First World War Poetry Archive

Based at the University of Oxford, the First World War Poetry Digital Archive has now added a number of new poetry collections, including David Jones and Siegfried Sassoon, to its existing online website. This new project sets out to enhance digital resources by making them more useful to practitioners and tying them in directly to curricula for pupils and students.

Eton Myers Collection Virtual Museum

The Eton Myers Collection provides free access to ancient Egyptian art through the creation of 3D models. Laser scanning in conjunction with the generation of a catalogue has created a Virtual Museum enabling global access to the collection, and will provide the centre piece of the University of Birmingham's Virtual Worlds Laboratory (VWL). The project will also significantly reduce the need for the future transportation of these artefacts, thus ensuring their long-term conservation. The resulting digital data will be curated at the University of Birmingham.

Exposing Marandet: French Plays from the 18th and 19th Centuries

The Exposing Marandet project has made openly and freely available a coherent set of pamphlets during a seminal period of French history. The archive is an essential part of teaching at the University of Warwick, and of interest to a broad audience of enthusiasts and researchers. The digitised material is 1,500 18th- and early 19th-century French plays - comprising 75,000 pages - from the Library's Marandet Collection, and to investigate opportunities to improve connections with the CESAR repository of French theatre resources.

Furer-Haimendorf Archive digitisation

This project is a comprehensive study of tribal cultures in South Asia including cine film, photographs and written journals before the influence of mid-twentieth century external influences. Fürer-Haimendorf was one of the few anthropologists of the inter-war generation in Europe to realise the importance of visual documentation. His collection of 26,000 images have now been digitised. The project will also use specialists in the relevant tribal cultures to catalogue these images and cross-reference a select group of them together with an unpublished diary, film footage and written material in the collection.

Historical Hansards: Completing the Jigsaw

The project will take more than 50 years of debates from the Upper Chamber of the Parliament of Northern Ireland from 1921 to 1972, the, and make it available online. The debates are wide-ranging in nature concerning the socio-economic and political development of a sometimes troubled part of the United Kingdom over a period of dramatic change. The project meets a clear demand amongst scholars in England and Wales for research material relating to the Northern Ireland that they simply do not have access to.

Image Path

This project has digitised three collections of pathology slides held by the University of Leeds – The Matthew Stewart Collection, the Cancer Research Campaign Soft Tissues Sarcoma collection and early cases from the Pathology archive collection. The slides contain valuable information about diseases that are rare or were common but are now not seen or are not seen at such advanced stages.

In the bigynnyng: the Manchester Middle English Digital Library

This project has digitised 41 medieval English manuscripts from the John Rylands Library at the University of Manchester.. A total of approx 12,000 images and metadata will be accessible via a dedicated project website. The project is closely aligned with the Library's strategic goals and with the wider strategic development of the University of Manchester.

Musicians of Britain and Ireland 1900-1950

This project recovered 2000 recordings selected to showcase British and Irish performers recorded between 1900 and 1950, especially artists neglected by the newly formed EMI after the merger of the Gramophone Co and Columbia in 1931. The project also is to raise awareness of the extent to which record company policies shape public perceptions of musical excellence and the reputation of artistic communities.

Resurrecting the Past: Virtual Antiquities in the 19th century

This project aims to develop and digitise at the University of Bristol a collection of material of the Pompeii Court of the Crystal Palace. A virtual recreation of the Pompeii Court in the Crystal Palace exhibition has now been successfully created. Like the original exhibition, the model is a complete life-size model of an ancient Roman house, including paintings and everyday objects, that was preserved after the eruption of mount Vesuvius.

Sudan Archive Digitisation Project

This project will digitise key printed and archive resources from Durham University's Sudan Archive to make them freely accessible via the internet to scholars all over the world. It will be a pilot to establish a preservation quality digitisation suite within Durham University's Archives and Special Collections.

Museum of Design in Plastics digitisation project

This project involves the creation of digital record of artefacts demonstrating design in plastics and the functional specification to support research into design in plastics and its cultural impact. It was created to enhance research and student learning and holds more than 8,000 (predominantly 20th Century) international, historical and contemporary design examples relating directly to the Bournemouth Art University College's specialist areas of study.

The Serving Soldier

The Serving Soldier will provide digital access to national archives held in the Liddell Hart Centre for Military Archives. As such it will support demonstrable internal and external demand. In taking the theme of the multi-faceted role of the soldier, it will expose a proportion of little known material (hidden stories) and provide a body of material of contemporary relevance to researchers, students and today's serving soldiers.

UK Colonial Registers & Royal Navy logbooks: Making the past available for the future

This project seeks to identify sources of old, previously overlooked, marine meteorological data from colonial (especially lighthouse) records and from the logbooks of Royal Navy vessels through from the 18th century and, thereby, to lend a longer-term perspective to more recent climatic variations. The project has digitised around 45,000 logbook pages, and over 20,000 images. Logbooks from many historic ships and voyages are included in the project, including those from: the Beagle, the Endeavour and Discovery.

Versatile Digitisation Framework Project

This project (VERDI) has developed a technical framework for the digitisation, cataloguing and web presentation of specialist material. The project has also created 'snippets' of code for embedding in websites and allowing searching of one or more specified collections. Documentation allowing for wider adoption of the framework will be available to academics at the University of Kent and to the wider academic community.

Virtual Manuscript Room

The Virtual Manuscript Room (VMR) brings together previously unavailable manuscripts, including the Mingana Collection of Middle Eastern Manuscripts. The Virtual Manuscript Room (VMR) will bring together digital resources related to manuscript materials (digital images, descriptions and other metadata, transcripts) in an environment which will permit libraries to add images, scholars to add and edit metadata and transcripts online, and users to access material. The centrepiece of the VMR will be full digitised manuscripts from Birmingham's Mingana collection of Middle Eastern manuscripts. Two other groups of content, amounting to over 50,000 digital images of manuscripts, 500 manuscript descriptions and around 1000 pages of transcripts, will be included in the VMR: materials relating to the New Testament and to medieval vernacular texts (Dante, Chaucer, and others).

Welsh Ballads – completing the British ballad network

The Welsh Ballads project will fill the final gap in the network of digitized collections of printed ballads around Britain, the Bodleian, National Library of Scotland and Glasgow University having undertaken projects on English and Scottish ballads already; between them these three contain about 30,000 ballads. A total of 5,000 ballads will be digitized, from the earliest 18th Century ballads to the final few published in the 20th Century. In total this will produce around 20,000 pages of digitized text images (all out of copyright).
