= Caledonian Mercury =

Historical Scottish newspaper

The Caledonian Mercury was a newspaper in Edinburgh, Scotland, published three times a week between 1720 and 1867. In 2010 an online publication launched using the name.

== 17th century ==
A short-lived predecessor, the Mercurius Caledonius, published for just twelve issues in 1660–1661, is believed to have been Scotland's first newspaper.

== 18th and 19th centuries ==
The Caledonian Mercury was launched in 1720. Like its competitor The Edinburgh Evening Courant, The Caledonian Mercury appeared three times a week until 1867. It was less prestigious than the Courant, largely because it was sold by a politically motivated bookseller and because its editors did not include recent news from elsewhere in Britain and Europe. In 1725, during the Scottish Malt Tax riots, rival political factions attempted to use newspapers like the Caledonian Mercury as their "mouthpieces", as a letter from Andrew Millar to Robert Wodrow illustrates. From 1729 to 1772, it was owned and run by Thomas Ruddiman and his family, before being taken over by John Robertson. It was described by Robert Chambers as "the first [newspaper] in Scotland which blended literary criticism with political matter." Notable contributors included James Boswell. In 1815, the paper was purchased by Thomas Allen & Co from 265 High Street, on the Royal Mile in Edinburgh. Numbers published from 1800 on are available online for registered users of the National Library of Scotland website.

From 1817 until 1860 the Courant was co-housed with The Scotsman newspaper.

Historical copies of the Caledonian Mercury, dating back to 1720, are available to search and view in digitized form at The British Newspaper Archive.

== 21st century ==
In January 2010, a Scottish online newspaper launched which had the name Caledonian Mercury. It was set up by Stewart Kirkpatrick (formerly responsible for The Scotsman website), Graham Jones and Tony Purcell. The site went live late at night on 24 January 2010 as Scotland's first web-only daily. The paper produced content aimed at a Scottish audience, with an office in Edinburgh's Hanover Street, operating using a revenue-sharing model. Kilpatrick left in August 2012.

== See also ==
- Burney Collection of Newspapers
