= Perfect Occurrences =

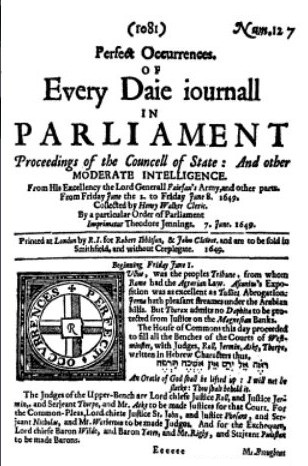
Perfect Occurrences, of Every Day journal in Parliament. Proceedings of the Council of State: And other Moderate Intelligence.

Perfect Occurrences was a weekly newspaper edited by Henry Walker (cleric) which became the semi-official mouth piece of Parliament in 1647.

== See also ==
30 September 1647 Ordinance for the regulation of printing and to prevent the issue of scandalous pamphlets.
