= Evening Post (London) =

London newspaper published from 1710 until February 1732

The Evening Post was a London newspaper published from 1710 until February 1732, not to be confused with the London Evening Post.

The paper was printed by E. Berington in Silver Street, Bloomsbury, and sold by John Morphew near Stationers-Hall.

The paper was then published as Berington's Evening Post from 8 February 1732 until 29 August 1740.

== See also ==
- Burney Collection of Newspapers
