= The Belfast Gazette =

Official newspaper of the UK government

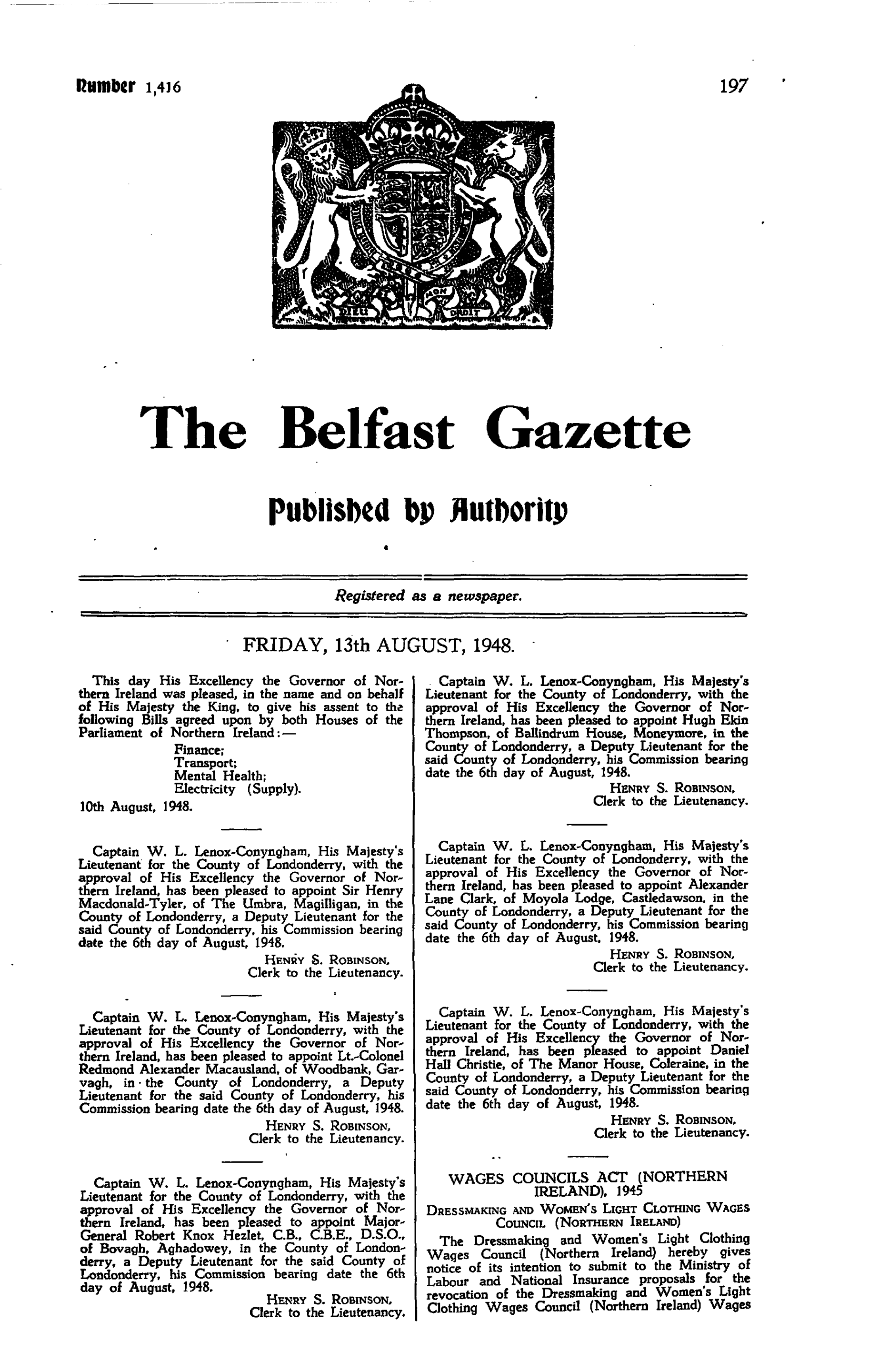
The Belfast Gazette, 13 August 1948

The Belfast Gazette is a newspaper of record (Government gazette) of the Government of the United Kingdom, along with The London Gazette and The Edinburgh Gazette. It is published by The Stationery Office (TSO), on behalf of His Majesty's Stationery Office (HMSO) in Belfast, Northern Ireland.

== History ==
The Belfast Gazette was first published on 7 June 1921. Previously the same function was performed for the whole of Ireland by The Dublin Gazette, but with the partition of Ireland, a separate publication was required in Northern Ireland. The Dublin Gazette was replaced in the Republic of Ireland by Iris Oifigiúil, on 31 December 1922.

Digitisation, and online hosting, of the archive of The Belfast Gazette back-issues commenced at the start of the 21st Century, and Gazettes-Online went live on 28 January 2003. (Note: A few individual issues are missing from TSO's archives)

== Publication ==
The Gazette (formally the combination of the UK's three official journals of record: The Belfast Gazette, The London Gazette and The Edinburgh Gazette) is now published online each weekday, except for bank holidays, by The Stationery Office.

A paper edition of The Belfast Gazette is published once a week, on Monday, and it includes official notices relating to matters of state, Parliament, the Northern Ireland Executive, the Northern Ireland Assembly, planning, transport, and public finance, as well as insolvency and bankruptcy notices, published online in the previous week.
