= Iris Oifigiúil =

Government gazette of Ireland

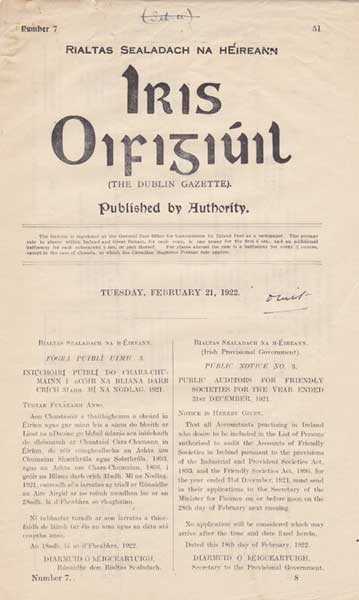
Front cover of Iris Oifigiúil 21 February 1922

Iris Oifigiúil (Irish pronunciation: [ˌɪɾʲəʃ ˈɛfʲəɟuːlʲ]; "Official Journal") is the official gazette of the government of Ireland. It replaced The Dublin Gazette, the gazette of the Dublin Castle administration, on 31 January 1922. The Belfast Gazette was established for the same purpose in the newly created Northern Ireland on 7 June 1921.

Iris Oifigiúil is sometimes referred to as the Irish State Gazette in English and has been issued twice weekly on Tuesdays and Fridays since 1922. Prima facie evidence on notices of government business are published in the newspaper; these include orders, rules, and proclamations.

The paper is published as a hard copy by the Office of Public Works. Since 2002, most contents are also published in the online edition. An exception is notices of naturalization: these are required under the Irish Nationality and Citizenship Act 1956 but online publication was stopped in 2016 on data privacy grounds. At the same time, the search functionality was removed from the website.

== See also ==
- The Dublin Gazette
- Irish Bulletin
- The London Gazette
- Dublin Historical Record 1953 Vol.XIII No.3.
- Official Journal of the European Union
