= The Stationery Office =

British publishing company

The Stationery Office Ltd
- Type: Subsidiary
- Industry: Publishing
- Predecessor: Her Majesty's Stationery Office
- Founded: 1996
- Headquarters: London, England, UK
- Parent: Williams Lea - An RRD Company
- Website: tso.co.uk

The Stationery Office (TSO) is a British publishing company created in 1996 when the publishing arm of Her Majesty's Stationery Office was privatised. It is the official publisher and the distributor for legislation, command and house papers, select committee reports, Hansard, and the London, Edinburgh and Belfast Gazettes, the UK government's three official journals of record. With more than 9,000 titles in print and digital formats published every year, it is one of the UK's largest publishers by volume.

TSO provides services, consultancy, and infrastructure to deliver all aspects of the information lifecycle. TSO developed the website legislation.gov.uk with The National Archives, providing full access to the statute book as open data.

== History ==
The Stationery Office was sold for £54 million when it was privatised in 1996. Two thirds of TSO was purchased by Electra Fleming, an investment trust co-owned by Electra Investment and the investment bank Robert Fleming & Company. Three executives of TSO purchased large stakes in the business: Rupert Pennant-Rea purchased a 4.5 per cent stake, Bob Thian a 6 per cent stake, and Richard Martin 3 per cent stake.

In 1999, Electra Fleming sold TSO to its existing management team and Apax, a private equity firm, for £82 million. Rupert Pennant-Rea remained as chairman, and Fred Perkins stayed as chief executive. TSO was sold in 2006 to business process outsourcing company Williams Lea, of which a majority stake had been acquired by logistics company Deutsche Post earlier that year.

The TSO OpenUp platform was a collection of integrated services available as software as a service (SaaS), with the aim of providing a scalable and resilient platform that allows organisations to store, query, and enrich their data. Open University academic Tony Hirst won the 2011 OpenUp contest for his ideas about the use of UCAS data. Hirst was chosen by a judging panel headed up by TSO director of digital products Robin Brattel, and included artificial intelligence expert Nigel Shadbolt and Open University director of communications Lucian J Hudson.

In 2014, TSO also began working with the local government sector, beginning with the redevelopment of the Croydon Council internal and external websites.

In January 2025, Williams Lea was acquired by RR Donnelley.

In November 2025, TSO concluded a licensing agreement with Witherby Publishing Group to release authorised digital editions of Maritime and Coastguard Agency and International Labour Organization publications.

== See also ==
- Office of Public Sector Information
- UK Parliament
