= Mary Crooke =

Irish printer and bookseller

- Born: Mary Tooke
- Known for: King's printer in Ireland

Mary Crooke (fl. 1657–1692) was an Irish printer and bookseller.

== Life ==
Mary Crooke was born in London, the daughter of haberdasher, Edmond Tooke. She married the king's printer in Ireland, John Crooke. They had four sons and three daughters. After his death in 1669 Crooke's brother, Benjamin Tooke, who had been an apprentice to her brother, was granted the patent of the king's printer in Ireland. He held this patent in trust for Crooke and her sons, John and Andrew, who were still minors. In practical terms, this meant that Crooke became the king's printer and held a monopoly on the printing, binding, and selling of books in Ireland. This made her one of the earliest recorded women printers in Ireland, along with Jane Jones in the 1740s.

Crooke operated from three premises in Dublin, Castle Street from 1670 to 1678, from King's Printing House, Skinner Row from 1678 to 1683, and then from Ormond Quay from 1683 to 1685. In 1677, she gave a silver cup to the Stationers' Company of London, and her apprentices in London were freed. Crooke's printing output was prodigious and her standards were low, while maintaining the business for her sons and resisting rival printers encroaching on her markets. She filed a petition against Thomas Bladen, who was forbidden to print, to the lord lieutenant in 1671, leading to his press being appropriated by the king's printer by order in 1673. In 1680 she took out a further petition against Joseph Ray, in which she was successful but which he ignored. When Crooke inherited the business it was heavily in debt, with her leadership it was profitable by the time her sons succeeded her.

Tooke and Crooke's son John became joint king's printers of Ireland in March 1671, a position they held for their lives. In August 1671, Tooke declared his trusteeship of the office for Crooke and her sons by deed. As they reached age, Crooke took her sons in partnership, John in 1679 and Andrew in 1680, retaining half of the profits for herself and her other children, by deed, and a quarter each to her sons so long as they maintained the business. She transferred the Skinner Row printing house to her sons in 1681, while she continued to operate from Ormond Quay. Her son John died intestate in 1683, with Crooke granted administration.

A dispute developed between Crooke and Andrew, leading to her dropping his name from official documents and Andrew running his Skinner Row printing press in rivalry to hers. Andrew filed two bills against Crooke on 3 November 1684 in the court of exchequer to negotiate for the patent rights of the king's printer. She replied by referring to the deed of 1680 which allowed her sons to share in the press' profits so long as they attended to the business, she complained that they had neglected the business, wasting stock-in-trade, and that Andrew set up his press in direct competition to hers. In 1685, an agreement was reached, with Crooke retiring that year, travelling to London to speed up the granting of the patent. It was granted to Andrew in 1686 with his partner Andrew Helsham assigned to Tooke as king's printers. Crooke made her will on 23 June 1685.

== See also ==
- List of women printers and publishers before 1800
