= The Edinburgh Gazette =

Official newspaper of the UK government

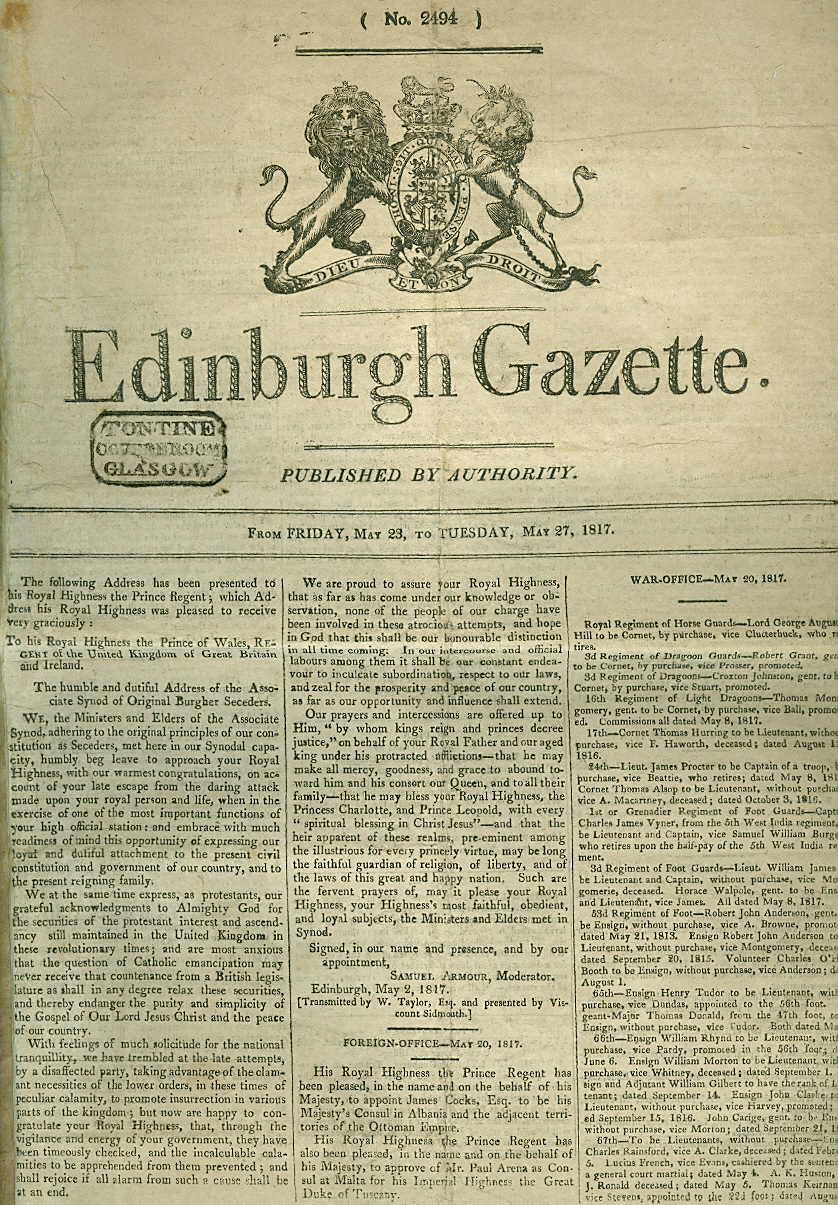
Edinburgh Gazette - 23 to 27 May 1817

The Edinburgh Gazette is a newspaper of record (government gazette) of the Government of the United Kingdom, along with The London Gazette and The Belfast Gazette. It is published by The Stationery Office (TSO), on behalf of His Majesty's Stationery Office (HMSO) in Edinburgh, Scotland. The Crown Agent is, ex officio, the Keeper of the Edinburgh Gazette.

== History ==
Publication of The Edinburgh Gazette began on 2 March 1699 by James Watson, nearly 34 years after the first edition of The London Gazette in November 1665. Watson printed 41 issues, the last on 17 July 1699. Captain Donaldson, the editor, said afterwards that Watson "found it in his interest to disengage himself", perhaps alluding to his imprisonment in the preceding June for printing false news on the wool export and reporting the riotous behaviour of some textile workers in The Edinburgh Gazette. The publication was then transferred to John Reid.

It reappeared sporadically, but did not begin an unbroken and continuous publication run until 1793.

Digitisation, and online hosting, of the archive of The Edinburgh Gazette back-issues commenced at the start of the 21st Century, and Gazettes-Online went live on 28 January 2003. (Note: A few individual issues are missing from TSO's archives)

== Publication ==
The Gazette (formally the combination of the UK's three official journals of record: The Edinburgh Gazette, The Belfast Gazette and The London Gazette) is now published online each weekday, except for bank holidays, by The Stationery Office.

A paper edition of The Edinburgh Gazette is published on Mondays and Wednesdays, and includes official notices relating to matters of state, Parliament, planning, transport, and public finance, as well as insolvency and bankruptcy notices, published online in the preceding days. It also contains advertisements. For instance, local authorities place notices in the Gazette about matters of local interest, such as road closures.
