= Office of Public Sector Information =

Body responsible for the operation of His Majesty's Stationery Office

The Office of Public Sector Information (OPSI) is the body responsible for the operation of His Majesty's Stationery Office (HMSO) and of other public information services of the United Kingdom. The OPSI is part of the National Archives of the United Kingdom and is responsible for Crown copyright.

The OPSI announced on 21 June 2006 that it was merging with the National Archives. The merger took place in October 2006. The OPSI continues to discharge its roles and responsibilities from within the structure of the National Archives.

== Controller of HMSO and Director of OPSI ==
The Controller of HMSO is also the Director of OPSI. HMSO continues to operate from within the expanded remit of OPSI. The Controller of HMSO also holds the offices of Kings's Printer of Acts of Parliament, King's Printer for Scotland, King's Printer for Wales and Government Printer for Northern Ireland.

By virtue of holding these offices OPSI publishes, through HMSO, the London Gazette, Edinburgh Gazette, Belfast Gazette and all legislation in the United Kingdom, including Acts of Parliament, Acts of the Scottish Parliament and statutory instruments.

The Controller of HMSO is appointed by Letters Patent to the office of King's Printer of Acts of Parliament. This office is separate from the functions of OPSI. Historically the role of King's (or Queen's) Printer extended to other official publishing responsibilities, e.g. the rights to print, publish and import the King James Bible and Book of Common Prayer within England, Wales and Northern Ireland. The current holder of this office is Cambridge University Press.

== History ==
HMSO was established as a new department of HM Treasury on 5 April 1786, when John Mayor was appointed as its first superintendent. The creation of the office was a result of the advocacy of Edmund Burke for reforms of the corrupt, expensive and inefficient Royal Household and the Civil Service. Before the establishment of HMSO, the Crown would grant patents (exclusive rights) for the supply of stationery; the patentee could buy these supplies cheaply and then charge highly inflated prices.

At first, HMSO was the agent for various government departments but, from 1822, all government departments were required to buy stationery through the open competitions and tenders operated by HMSO.

HMSO also took over as official publisher for both houses of Parliament from Hansard in 1882.

In 1889, HMSO was granted letters patent under which it was appointed as Queen's Printer of Acts of Parliament ("printer to Her Majesty of all Acts of Parliament"). These letters patent also appointed the Controller of HMSO as administrator of the rights of Crown copyright. HMSO also took over publication of the London Gazette in the same year.

In 1986, HMSO celebrated its bicentenary.

Since 1947, it has printed 86 million copies of The Highway Code. It is one of the biggest publishers in the world, having published 9,300 titles last year and holding 49,000 titles in stock. It produces nearly 600 pages of Hansard and other parliamentary papers overnight, as well as Bills, Acts, white papers, 2.3 million passports a year, 28.2 million pension and allowance books a year, and all sorts of other publications from the British Pharmacopoeia to guides to long-distance footpaths. In the 1980s, the Stationery Office also supplied 1,500 million envelopes a year (at a cost of £11 million) as well as 18 million ball-point pens and 188 million paper-clips.

Most of its publishing functions were privatised in 1996 as a separate company known as The Stationery Office (TSO), but HMSO continued as a separate part of the Cabinet Office. Prior to 1996, it was the publisher of virtually all government material, such as command papers, legislation and official histories. After 1996, the Controller of HMSO remained Queen's Printer of Acts of Parliament and retained the role of administering Crown copyright.

The privatisation was not the final stage in HMSO's changing role. As part of the implementation of the European Union directive on the re-use of public sector information, it was decided that there was a need for a dedicated body to be the principal focal point for advising on and regulating the operation of public sector information re-use. That new body, created in 2005, is the OPSI.

== Published works (examples) ==
- Great Britain. Parliament. House of Commons (1900). Papers by Command, Volume 105. H.M. Stationery Office.
- Great Britain. Foreign Office; MacDonald, Claude M. (1900). Reports from Her Majesty's minister in China respecting events at Peking: Presented to both houses of Parliament by command of Her Majesty, December 1900. Vol. 364 of Cd. (Great Britain. Parliament). H.M. Stationery Office.
- Great Britain. Foreign Office (1905). British and Foreign State Papers. H.M. Stationery Office.

== See also ==
- History of the Second World War published by the Office
- ePSIplus
- The Stationery Office
- Anglia Square, former headquarters of HMSO
