= The London Gazette =

Official public record of the UK government

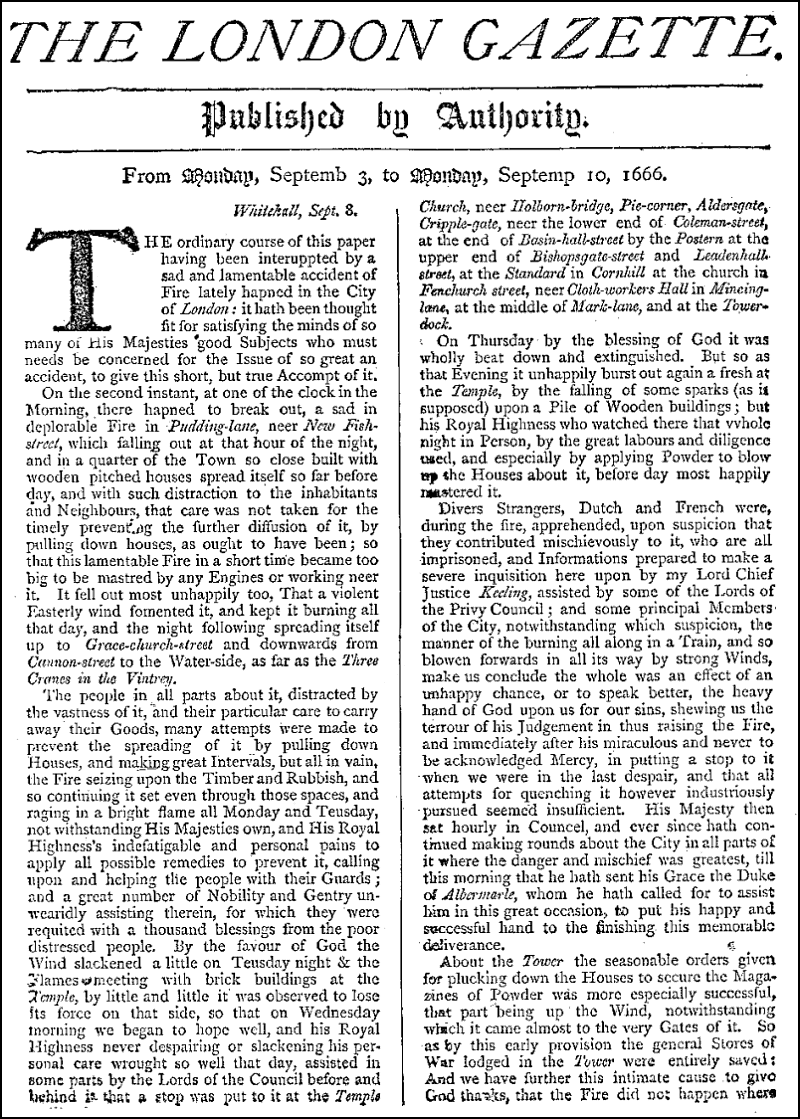
- A London Gazette reprint of its front page from 3–10 September 1666, reporting on the Great Fire of London
- Type: Daily newspaper
- Format: Broadsheet
- Founded: 7 November 1665 (361 years ago)
- Language: English
- Headquarters: United Kingdom
- Website: thegazette.co.uk

The London Gazette, known generally as The Gazette, is one of the official journals of record or government gazettes of the Government of the United Kingdom, and the most important among such official journals in the United Kingdom, in which certain statutory notices are required to be published.

Other official newspapers of the UK government are The Edinburgh Gazette and The Belfast Gazette, which, apart from reproducing certain materials of nationwide interest published in The London Gazette, also contain publications specific to Scotland and Northern Ireland, respectively. In turn, The London Gazette carries not only notices of UK-wide interest, but also those relating specifically to entities or people in England and Wales. However, certain notices that are only of specific interest to Scotland or Northern Ireland are also required to be published in The London Gazette.

The London, Edinburgh and Belfast Gazettes are published by The Stationery Office (TSO) on behalf of His Majesty's Stationery Office. They are subject to Crown copyright.

The London Gazette claims to be the oldest surviving English newspaper and the oldest continuously published newspaper in the UK, having been first published on 7 November 1665 as The Oxford Gazette. (Note: The claim to being oldest is also made by the Stamford Mercury (1712) and Berrow's Worcester Journal (1690).)

== Current publication ==
The Gazette (formally the combination of the UK's three official journals of record: The London Gazette, The Belfast Gazette and The Edinburgh Gazette) is now published online each weekday, except for bank holidays, by The Stationery Office. A printed edition of London Gazette is also published on the same schedule, and of the other two, less frequently.

Notices for the following, among others, are published:

- Granting of royal assent to bills of the Parliament of the United Kingdom, the Scottish Parliament, the Senedd and the Northern Ireland Assembly
- The issuance of writs of election when a vacancy occurs in the House of Commons
- Appointments to certain public offices
- Commissions in the Armed Forces and subsequent promotion of officers
- Corporate and personal insolvency
- Granting of awards of honours and military medals
- Changes of names or of coats of arms
- Royal proclamations and other declarations

His Majesty's Stationery Office has digitised all available issues of The London Gazette (Note: A few individual issues are missing from TSO's archives.) and these are available online.

The content is also available in a number of machine-readable formats, including XML (delivery by email/FTP) and XML/RDFa via Atom feed. All content is available under the Open Government Licence v3.0, except where otherwise stated.

== History ==
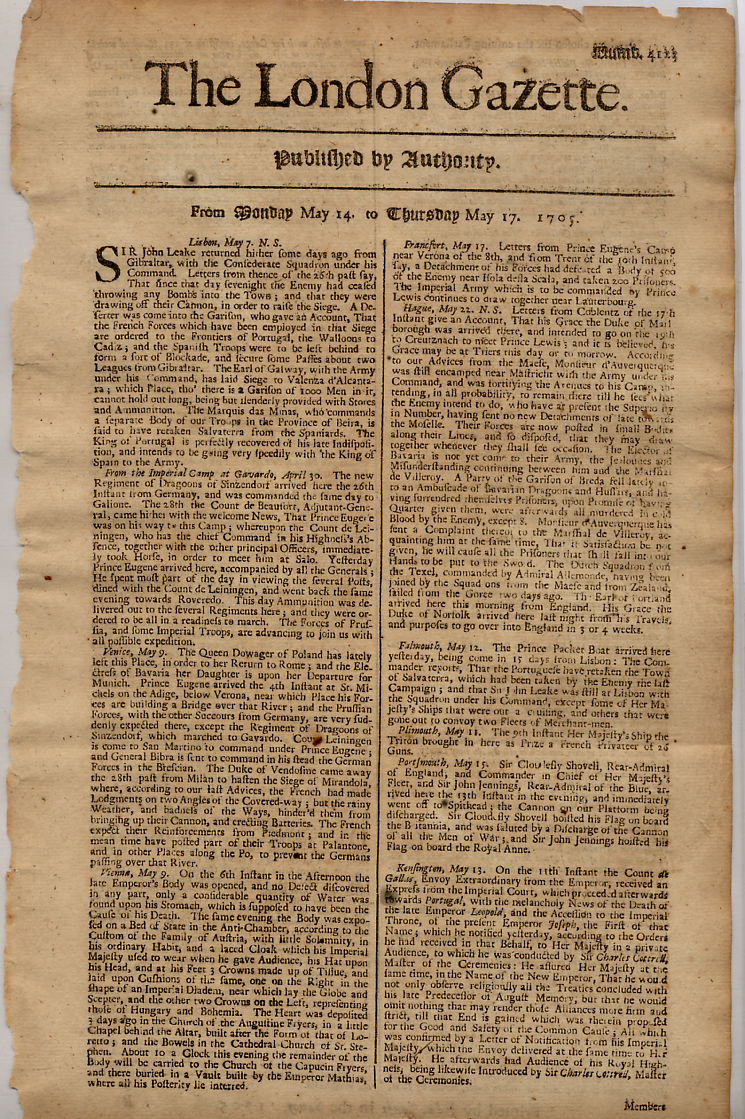
The London Gazette, dated 14–17 May 1705 detailing the return of John Leake from Gibraltar after the Battle of Cabrita Point

The London Gazette was first published as The Oxford Gazette on 7 November 1665. Charles II and the Royal Court had moved to Oxford to escape the Great Plague of London, and courtiers were unwilling to touch London newspapers for fear of contagion. The Gazette was "Published by Authority" by Henry Muddiman, and its first publication is noted by Samuel Pepys in his diary; in the entry dated 22 November 1665, Pepys recorded:

This day the first of the Oxford Gazettes come out, which is very pretty, full of newes, and no folly in it. Wrote by Williamson.

The King returned to London as the plague dissipated, and the Gazette moved too, with the first issue of The London Gazette (labelled No. 24) being published on 5 February 1666. The Gazette was not a newspaper in the modern sense: it was sent by post to subscribers, not printed for sale to the general public.

His Majesty's Stationery Office took over the publication of The London Gazette in 1889. Publication was transferred to the private sector in 2006, under government supervision, when HMSO was sold and renamed The Stationery Office.

Digitisation, and online hosting, of the archive of The London Gazette back-issues commenced at the start of the 21st Century, and Gazettes-Online went live on 28 January 2003. Since 2014 onwards, The Gazette is only available online.

=== Dates before 1 January 1752 ===
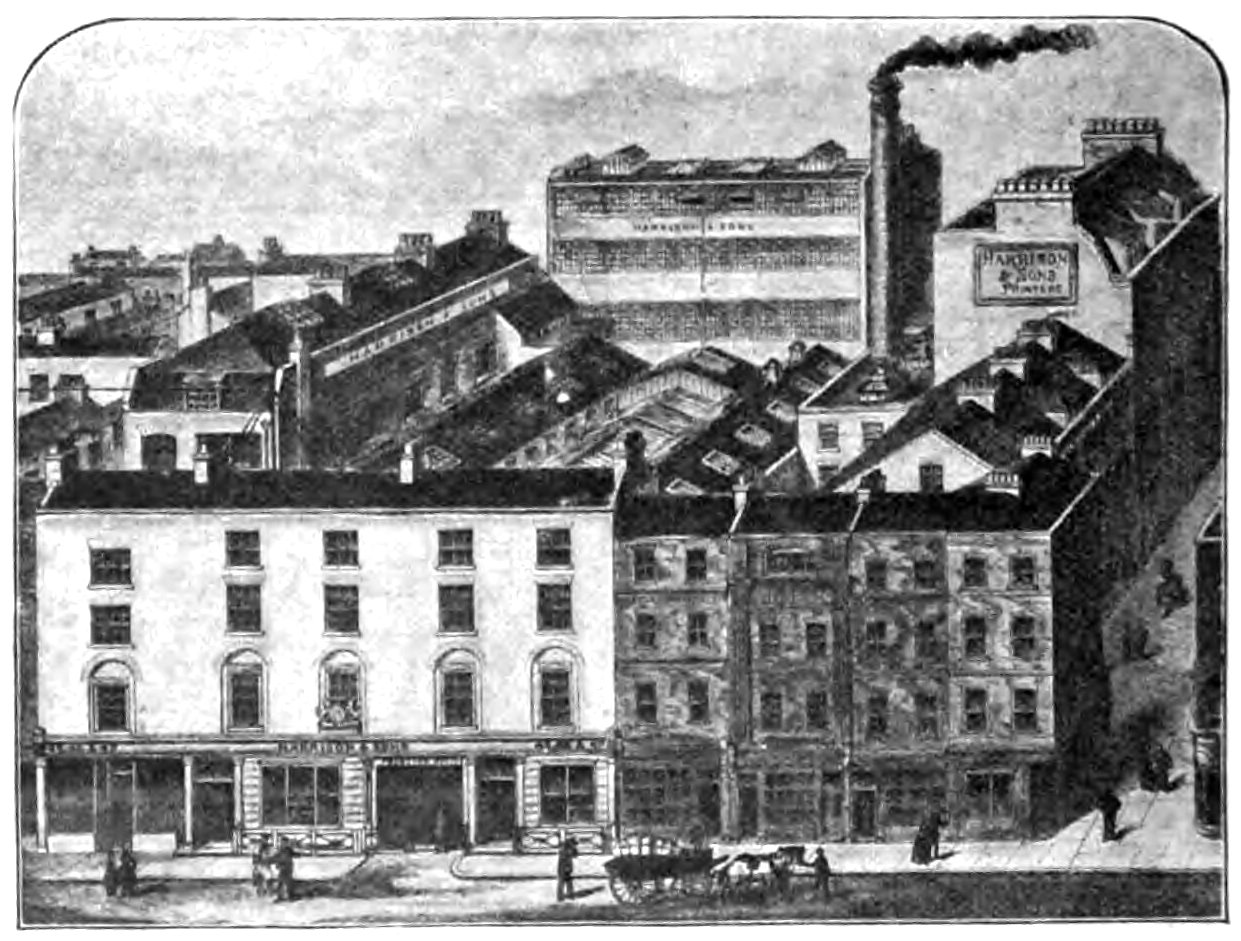
Illustration from The Strand Magazine, Volume 26 (1903), issue 151, p. 88, originally captioned "Messrs. Harrison and Sons' printing works in St. Martin's Lane, where the 'London Gazette' has been printed for one hundred and thirty years."

Until the Calendar (New Style) Act 1750 came into effect on 1 January 1752 (N.S.), The London Gazette was published with a date based on the Julian calendar with the start of year as 25 March. (Modern secondary sources may adjust the start of the calendar year during this period to 1 January, while retaining the original day and month. Using this adjustment, an issue with a printed date of 24 March 1723 (O.S.) will be reported as being published in 1724 – the same solar year as an issue published two days later, on 26 March 1724.)

=== In art ===
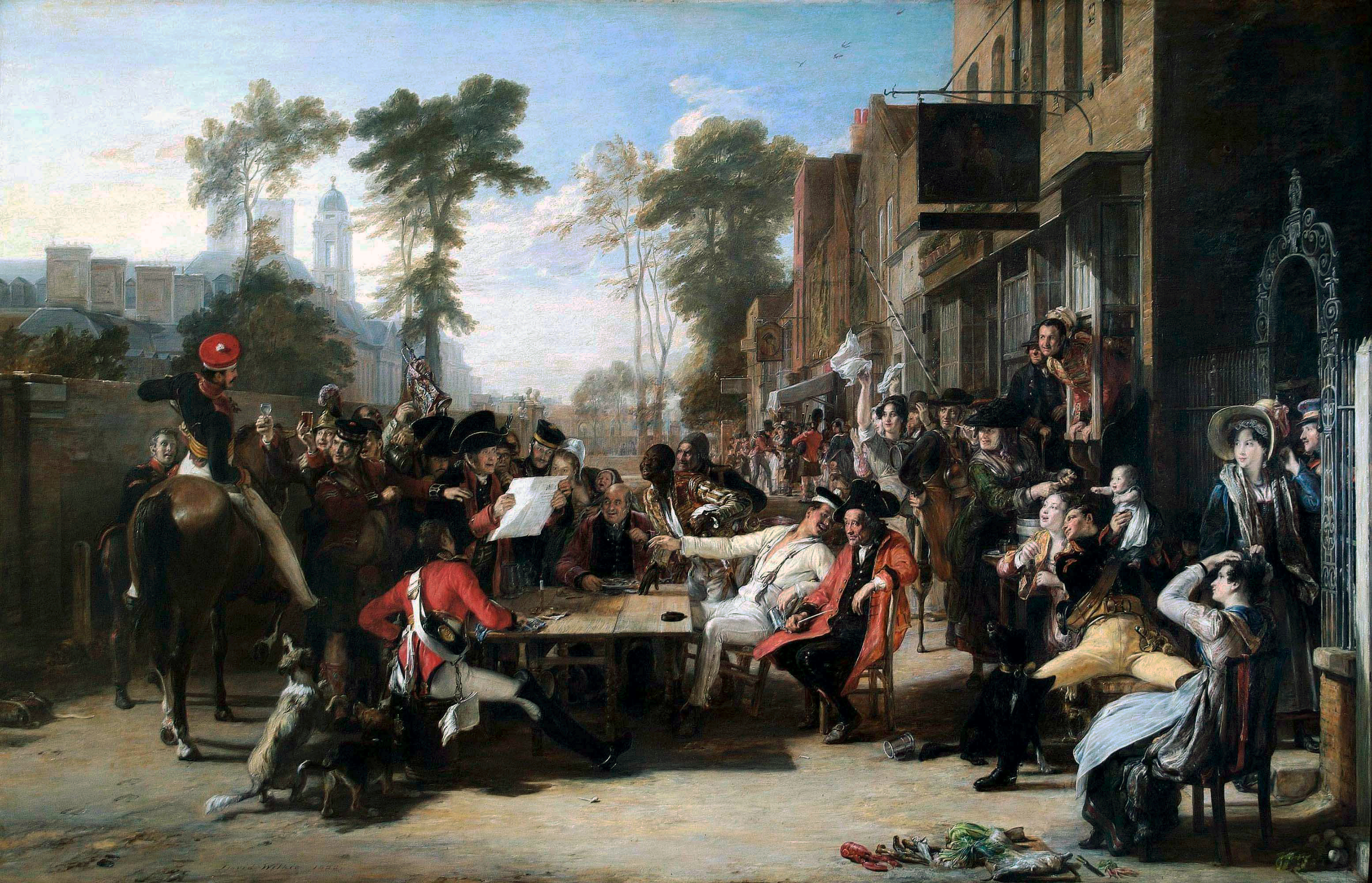
David Wilkie's painting The Chelsea Pensioners reading the Waterloo Dispatch.

The Gazette features in an oil painting by David Wilkie, commissioned by Arthur Wellesley, 1st Duke of Wellington in August 1816 and completed in 1822. The Chelsea Pensioners reading the Waterloo Dispatch, originally entitled Chelsea Pensioners Receiving the London Gazette Extraordinary of Thursday, June 22, 1815, Announcing the Battle of Waterloo, depicts Chelsea Pensioners reading the edition featuring Wellington's dispatch.

== "Gazetted" ==
In time of war, dispatches from the various conflicts are published in The London Gazette. Soldiers who are mentioned in despatches are also named in the Gazette. When members of the armed forces are promoted, and these promotions are published here, the person is said to have been "gazetted".

Being "gazetted" (or "in the gazette") also meant having official notice of one's bankruptcy published, as in the classic ten-line poem comparing the stolid tenant farmer of 1722 to the lavishly spending faux-genteel farmers of 1822:

Man to the plough
Wife to the cow
Girl to the yarn
Boy to the barn
And your rent will be netted.

Man tally-ho
Miss piano
Wife silk and satin
Boy Greek and Latin
And you'll all be Gazetted.

Notices of engagement and marriage were also formerly published in the Gazette.

== Colonial gazettes ==
Gazettes, modelled on The London Gazette, were issued for most British colonial possessions. Many of these continued after independence, and to the present day.

== See also ==
- History of British newspapers
- Mercurius Politicus - a government newspaper of the Cromwell era, published 1650–1660
- The Dublin Gazette
- Iris Oifigiúil - replaced the Dublin Gazette
- Official Journal of the European Union
- List of government gazettes
