= Records of Irish heads of government since 1922 =

The Taoiseach (plural: Taoisigh) is the head of government of Ireland. Prior to the enactment of the Constitution of Ireland in 1937, the head of government was referred to as the President of the Executive Council. This office was first held by W. T. Cosgrave from 1922 to 1932, and then by Éamon de Valera from 1932 to 1937. By convention Taoisigh are numbered to include Cosgrave, for example Micheál Martin is considered the 15th Taoiseach.

== Electoral history ==
No.	Name	Born	First elected	Party	Constituency	Left Dáil
1	W. T. Cosgrave	6 June 1880	10 August 1917 (Note: First elected to the British House of Commons in 1917 but did not take his seat.)	Cumann na nGaedheal (Note: First elected as member of Sinn Féin.)	Kilkenny City (1917–1918); North Kilkenny (1918–1921); Carlow–Kilkenny (1921–1927); Cork Borough (1927–1944)	30 May 1944
2	Éamon de Valera	14 October 1882	10 July 1917	Fianna Fáil	East Clare (1917–1922); Clare (1922–1959)	23 June 1959
3	John A. Costello	20 June 1891	24 January 1933	Fine Gael (Note: First elected as a Cumann na nGaedheal Teachta Dála.)	Dublin County (1933–1937); Dublin Townships (1937–1943; 1944–1948); Dublin South-East (1948–1969)	18 June 1969
4	Seán Lemass	12 July 1899	18 November 1924	Fianna Fáil	Dublin South (1924–1948); Dublin South-Central (1948–1969)	18 June 1969
5	Jack Lynch	15 August 1917	29 March 1948	Fianna Fáil	Cork Borough (1948–1969); Cork City North-West (1969–1977); Cork City (1977–1981)	11 June 1981
6	Liam Cosgrave	13 April 1920	29 March 1943	Fine Gael	Dublin County (1943–1948); Dún Laoghaire and Rathdown (1948–1977); Dún Laoghaire (1977–1981)	11 June 1981
7	Charles Haughey	16 September 1925	29 March 1957	Fianna Fáil	Dublin North-East (1957–1977); Dublin Artane (1977–1981); Dublin North-Central (1981–1992)	25 November 1992
8	Garret FitzGerald	9 February 1926	18 June 1969	Fine Gael	Dublin South-East	25 November 1992
9	Albert Reynolds	3 November 1932	16 June 1977	Fianna Fáil	Longford–Westmeath (1977–1992); Longford–Roscommon (1992–2002)	17 May 2002
10	John Bruton	18 May 1947	18 June 1969	Fine Gael	Meath	31 October 2004
11	Bertie Ahern	12 September 1951	16 June 1977	Fianna Fáil	Dublin Finglas (1977–1981); Dublin Central (1981–2011)	1 February 2011
12	Brian Cowen	10 January 1960	14 June 1984	Fianna Fáil	Laois–Offaly	1 February 2011
13	Enda Kenny	24 April 1951	12 November 1975	Fine Gael	Mayo West (1975–1997); Mayo (1997–2020)	14 January 2020
14	Leo Varadkar	18 January 1979	24 May 2007	Fine Gael	Dublin West	8 November 2024
15	Micheál Martin	1 August 1960	15 June 1989	Fianna Fáil	Cork South-Central	
16	Simon Harris	17 October 1986	25 February 2011	Fine Gael	Wicklow	

== Periods in office ==
No.	Name	Entered office	Left office	Dáil(s)	Period	Party
1	W. T. Cosgrave	6 December 1922 (Note: Cosgrave also headed the Irish Government from 22 August 1922, during the transitional period before the state became officially independent on 6 December 1922 (See List of Irish heads of government).)	9 March 1932	3rd, 4th, 5th, 6th	–	Cumann na nGaedheal
2	Éamon de Valera	9 March 1932 (Note: De Valera became Taoiseach on 29 December 1937 under the Constitution of Ireland.) (Note: De Valera also headed the pre-independence revolutionary Irish Government from 1 April 1919 to 9 January 1922 (See List of Irish heads of government).)	18 February 1948	7th, 8th, 9th 10th, 11th, 12th (Note: De Valera also served 3 terms as President of the Executive Council.)	1st time	Fianna Fáil
3	John A. Costello	18 February 1948	13 June 1951	13th	1st time	Fine Gael
(2)	Éamon de Valera	13 June 1951	2 June 1954	14th	2nd time	Fianna Fáil
(3)	John A. Costello	2 June 1954	20 March 1957	15th	2nd time	Fine Gael
(2)	Éamon de Valera	20 March 1957	23 June 1959	16th	3rd time	Fianna Fáil
4	Seán Lemass	23 June 1959	10 November 1966	16th, 17th, 18th	–	Fianna Fáil
5	Jack Lynch	10 November 1966	14 March 1973	18th, 19th	1st time	Fianna Fáil
6	Liam Cosgrave	14 March 1973	5 July 1977	20th	–	Fine Gael
(5)	Jack Lynch	5 July 1977	11 December 1979	21st	2nd time	Fianna Fáil
7	Charles Haughey	11 December 1979	30 June 1981	21st	1st time	Fianna Fáil
8	Garret FitzGerald	30 June 1981	9 March 1982	22nd	1st time	Fine Gael
(7)	Charles Haughey	9 March 1982	14 December 1982	23rd	2nd time	Fianna Fáil
(8)	Garret FitzGerald	14 December 1982	10 March 1987	24th	2nd time	Fine Gael
(7)	Charles Haughey	10 March 1987	11 February 1992	25th, 26th	3rd time	Fianna Fáil
9	Albert Reynolds	11 February 1992	15 December 1994	26th, 27th	–	Fianna Fáil
10	John Bruton	15 December 1994	26 June 1997	27th	–	Fine Gael
11	Bertie Ahern	26 June 1997	7 May 2008	28th, 29th, 30th	–	Fianna Fáil
12	Brian Cowen	7 May 2008	9 March 2011	30th	–	Fianna Fáil
13	Enda Kenny	9 March 2011	14 June 2017	31st, 32nd	–	Fine Gael
14	Leo Varadkar	14 June 2017	27 June 2020	32nd	1st time	Fine Gael
15	Micheál Martin	27 June 2020	17 December 2022	33rd	1st time	Fianna Fáil
(14)	Leo Varadkar	17 December 2022	9 April 2024	33rd	2nd time	Fine Gael
16	Simon Harris	9 April 2024	23 January 2025	33rd	–	Fine Gael
(15)	Micheál Martin	23 January 2025	Incumbent	34th	2nd time	Fianna Fáil

== Cumulative days served ==
No.	Name	First entered office	Finally left office	Periods	Cumulative days (Note: Days shown include five periods when a Taoiseach resigned but continued as Acting Taoiseach, as required by the Article 28.11.1 of the Constitution. These periods are 13 days for Charles Haughey (from 29 June to 12 July 1989), 57 days for Albert Reynolds (29 days from 14 December 1992 to 12 January 1993, and 28 days from 17 November to 15 December 1994), 57 days for Enda Kenny (from 10 March to 6 May 2016), and 128 days for Leo Varadkar from 20 February to 27 June 2020.)
2	Éamon de Valera	9 March 1932	23 June 1959	3	7,735 (21 years, 2 months) (Note: De Valera served as Taoiseach for 5,613 days (15 years, 4 months).) (Note: De Valera also led the pre-independence revolutionary Ministry of Dáil Éireann from 1 April 1919 to 9 January 1922 (See List of Irish heads of government). Including these 1,015 extra days would raise his cumulative days served to 8,750 days (23 years, 11 months, 16 days).)
11	Bertie Ahern	26 June 1997	7 May 2008	1	3,968 (10 years, 10 months)
1	W. T. Cosgrave	6 December 1922	9 March 1932	1	3,381 (9 years, 3 months) (Note: Cosgrave also led the Provisional Government from 22 August 1922, during the transitional period before the state became independent on 6 December 1922 (See List of Irish heads of government). Including these 106 extra days would raise his cumulative days served to 3,487 days (9 years, 6 months, 19 days).)
5	Jack Lynch	10 November 1966	11 December 1979	2	3,205 (8 years, 9 months)
4	Seán Lemass	23 June 1959	10 November 1966	1	2,697 (7 years, 5 months)
7	Charles Haughey	11 December 1979	11 February 1992	3	2,646 (7 years, 3 months)
13	Enda Kenny	9 March 2011	14 June 2017	1	2,289 (6 years, 3 months)
3	John A. Costello	18 February 1948	20 March 1957	2	2,233 (6 years, 1 month)
8	Garret FitzGerald	30 June 1981	10 March 1987	2	1,799 (4 years, 11 months)
14	Leo Varadkar	14 June 2017	9 April 2024	2	1,589 (4 years, 4 months)
6	Liam Cosgrave	14 March 1973	5 July 1977	1	1,574 (4 years, 4 months)
15	Micheál Martin	27 June 2020	Incumbent	2	1,471 (4 years and 10 days)
9	Albert Reynolds	11 February 1992	15 December 1994	1	1,038 (2 years, 10 months)
12	Brian Cowen	7 May 2008	9 March 2011	1	1,036 (2 years, 10 months)
10	John Bruton	15 December 1994	26 June 1997	1	924 (2 years, 6 months)
16	Simon Harris	9 April 2024	23 January 2025	1	289 (9 months, 14 days)

== Length of individual periods ==
No.	Name	Entered office	Left office	Period No.	Period length	Length in days
2	Éamon de Valera	9 March 1932	18 February 1948	1	15 years, 11 months, 16 days	5,824
11	Bertie Ahern	26 June 1997	7 May 2008	1	10 years, 10 months, 11 days	3,968
1	W. T. Cosgrave	6 December 1922	9 March 1932	1	9 years, 3 months, 4 days	3,381
4	Seán Lemass	23 June 1959	11 November 1966	1	7 years, 4 months, 17 days	2,697
5	Jack Lynch	11 November 1966	14 March 1973	1	6 years, 4 months, 4 days	2,316
13	Enda Kenny	9 March 2011	14 June 2017	1	6 years, 3 months, 5 days	2,289
7	Charles Haughey	10 March 1987	11 February 1992	3	4 years, 11 months, 1 day	1,799
6	Liam Cosgrave	14 March 1973	5 July 1977	1	4 years, 3 months, 22 days	1,574
8	Garret FitzGerald	14 December 1982	10 March 1987	2	4 years, 2 months, 27 days	1,547
3	John A. Costello	18 February 1948	13 June 1951	1	3 years, 3 months, 24 days	1,211
14	Leo Varadkar	14 June 2017	27 June 2020	1	3 years and 13 days	1,109
	Éamon de Valera	13 June 1951	2 June 1954	2	2 years, 11 months, 19 days	1,085
9	Albert Reynolds	11 February 1992	15 December 1994	1	2 years, 10 months, 4 days	1,038
12	Brian Cowen	7 May 2008	9 March 2011	1	2 years, 10 months, 2 days	1,036
	John A. Costello	2 June 1954	20 March 1957	2	2 years, 9 months, 18 days	1,022
10	John Bruton	15 December 1994	26 June 1997	1	2 years, 6 months, 11 days	924
15	Micheál Martin	27 June 2020	17 December 2022	1	2 years, 5 months, 21 days	904
	Jack Lynch	5 July 1977	11 December 1979	2	2 years, 5 months, 6 days	889
	Éamon de Valera	20 March 1957	23 June 1959	3	2 years, 3 months, 3 days	825
	Micheál Martin	23 January 2025	Incumbent	2	1 year, 6 months and 21 days	567
	Charles Haughey	11 December 1979	30 June 1981	1	1 year, 6 months, 19 days	567
	Leo Varadkar	17 December 2022	9 April 2024	2	1 year, 3 months, 23 days	479
16	Simon Harris	9 April 2024	23 January 2025	1	9 months, 14 days	289
	Charles Haughey	9 March 1982	14 December 1982	2	9 months, 5 days	280
	Garret FitzGerald	30 June 1981	9 March 1982	1	8 months, 9 days	252

== Longevity ==
No.	Name	Born	Died	Age as of 13 August 2026
6	Liam Cosgrave	13 April 1920	4 October 2017	97 years, 174 days
2	Éamon de Valera	14 October 1882	29 August 1975	92 years, 319 days
1	W. T. Cosgrave	6 June 1880	16 November 1965	85 years, 163 days
8	Garret FitzGerald	9 February 1926	19 May 2011	85 years, 99 days
3	John A. Costello	20 June 1891	5 January 1976	84 years, 199 days
5	Jack Lynch	15 August 1917	20 October 1999	82 years, 66 days
9	Albert Reynolds	3 November 1932	21 August 2014	81 years, 291 days
7	Charles Haughey	16 September 1925	13 June 2006	80 years, 270 days
10	John Bruton	18 May 1947	6 February 2024	76 years, 264 days
13	Enda Kenny	24 April 1951		75 years, 111 days
11	Bertie Ahern	12 September 1951		74 years, 335 days
4	Seán Lemass	12 July 1899	11 May 1971	71 years, 303 days
12	Brian Cowen	10 January 1960		66 years, 215 days
15	Micheál Martin	1 August 1960		66 years, 12 days
14	Leo Varadkar	18 January 1979		47 years, 207 days
16	Simon Harris	17 October 1986		39 years, 300 days

== Age on entering/leaving office ==
No.	Name	Born	Entered office	Age	Left office	Age
16	Simon Harris	17 October 1986	9 April 2024	37 years, 7 months (Note: Three leaders entered office when younger than Harris, during or after the 1916 Easter Rising, but before British rule officially ended, and the Irish Free State came into existence on 6 December 1922. The youngest was Michael Collins, aged 31 years, 3 months when he became Chairman of the Provisional Government of the Irish Free State on 16 January 1922. Éamon de Valera was aged 36 years, 5 months when he became President of Dáil Éireann on 1 April 1919. Patrick Pearse was also aged 36 years, 5 months when he became President of the Irish Republic proclaimed on Easter Monday, 24 April 1916. (See List of Irish heads of government and Easter Rising).)	23 January 2025	38 years, 5 months
14	Leo Varadkar	18 January 1979	14 June 2017	38 years, 4 months	9 April 2024	45 years, 2 months
1	W. T. Cosgrave	6 June 1880	6 December 1922 (Note: Cosgrave entered office as Chairman of the Provisional Government on 22 August 1922, when aged 42 years, 2 months. The age given in the table is his age when the Irish Free State was established on 6 December 1922 and he was appointed as President of the Executive Council. (See List of Irish heads of government).)	42 years, 6 months	9 March 1932	51 years, 9 months
11	Bertie Ahern	12 September 1951	26 June 1997	45 years, 9 months	7 May 2008	56 years, 7 months
10	John Bruton	18 May 1947	15 December 1994	47 years, 6 months	26 June 1997	50 years, 1 month
12	Brian Cowen	10 January 1960	7 May 2008	48 years, 3 months	9 March 2011	51 years, 1 month
5	Jack Lynch	15 August 1917	10 November 1966	49 years, 2 months	11 December 1979	62 years, 3 months
2	Éamon de Valera	14 October 1882	9 March 1932	49 years, 4 months (Note: De Valera also headed the pre-independence revolutionary Irish Government from 1 April 1919 to 9 January 1922, thus entering the office of President of Dáil Éireann when aged 36 years, 5 months (he was aged 38 years, 10 months when the office was renamed President of the Irish Republic on 26 August 1921). The table shows his age when he became President of the Executive Council of the Irish Free State on 9 March 1932. Under the new 1937 Constitution, his title changed to Taoiseach on 29 December 1937, when he was aged 55 years, 2 months. (See also List of Irish heads of government and Éamon de Valera).)	23 June 1959	76 years, 8 months
6	Liam Cosgrave	13 April 1920	14 March 1973	52 years, 11 months	5 July 1977	57 years, 2 months
7	Charles Haughey	16 September 1925	11 December 1979	54 years, 2 months	11 February 1992	66 years, 4 months
8	Garret FitzGerald	9 February 1926	30 June 1981	55 years, 4 months	10 March 1987	61 years, 1 month
3	John A. Costello	20 June 1891	18 February 1948	56 years, 7 months	20 March 1957	65 years, 9 months
9	Albert Reynolds	3 November 1932	11 February 1992	59 years, 3 months	15 December 1994	62 years, 1 month
13	Enda Kenny	24 April 1951	9 March 2011	59 years, 10 months	14 June 2017	66 years, 1 month
15	Micheál Martin	1 August 1960	27 June 2020	59 years, 10 months	Incumbent	–
4	Seán Lemass	12 July 1899	23 June 1959	59 years, 11 months	10 November 1966	67 years, 3 months

== Cabinet positions ==
Listed here are cabinet positions held either before or during holding the office of Taoiseach or President of the Executive Council.

No.	Name	Before or after position of Taoiseach	While Taoiseach
1	W. T. Cosgrave	Minister for Local Government (1919–1922); Minister for Finance (1922–1923); Chairman of the Provisional Government (1922); President of Dáil Éireann (1922)	Minister for Finance (1922–1923); Minister for Defence (1924) (Note: Held between the resignation or death of a member of the cabinet and the appointment of another member to the position.); Minister for External Affairs (1927)
2	Éamon de Valera	President of Dáil Éireann (1919–1922)	Minister for External Affairs (1932–1948); Minister for Education (1939–1940); Minister for Local Government and Public Health (1941)
3	John A. Costello	Attorney General (1926–1932)	Minister for Health (1951)
4	Seán Lemass	Minister for Industry and Commerce (1932–1939, 1941–1948, 1951–1954, 1957–1959); Minister for Supplies (1939–1945); Tánaiste (1945–1948, 1951–1954, 1957–1959)	Minister for Justice (1964)
5	Jack Lynch	Minister for the Gaeltacht (1957); Minister for Education (1957–1959); Minister for Industry and Commerce (1959–1965); Minister for Finance 1965–1966)	Minister for Education (1968)
6	Liam Cosgrave	Minister for External Affairs (1954–1957)	Minister for Defence (1976)
7	Charles Haughey	Minister for Justice (1961–1964); Minister for Agriculture (1964–1966); Minister for Finance (1966–1970); Minister for Health (1977–1979); Minister for Social Welfare (1977–1979)	Minister for Education (1982); Minister for the Gaeltacht (1987–1992); Minister for Defence (1990–1991)
8	Garret FitzGerald	Minister for Foreign Affairs (1973–1977)	Minister for Trade, Commerce and Tourism (1983)
9.	Albert Reynolds	Minister for Posts and Telegraphs (1979–1981); Minister for Transport 1980–1981); Minister for Industry and Energy (1982); Minister for Industry and Commerce (1987–1988); Minister for Finance (1988–1991)	Minister for Energy (1992–1993)
10	John Bruton	Minister for Finance (1981–1982, 1986–1987); Minister for Industry and Energy (1982–1983); Minister for Industry, Trade, Commerce and Tourism (1983–1986); Minister for the Public Service (1987)	Minister for Transport, Energy and Communications (1996)
11	Bertie Ahern	Minister for Labour (1987–1991); Minister for Finance (1991–1994); Minister for Industry and Commerce (1993); Tánaiste (1994); Minister for Arts, Culture and the Gaeltacht (1994)	
12	Brian Cowen	Minister for Labour (1992–1993); Minister for Transport, Energy and Communications (1993–1994); Minister for Health and Children (1997–2000); Minister for Foreign Affairs (2000–2004); Minister for Finance (2004–2008); Tánaiste (2007–2008)	Minister for Foreign Affairs (2011)
13	Enda Kenny	Minister for Tourism and Trade (1994–1997)	Minister for Defence (2014); Minister for Defence (2016–2017)
14	Leo Varadkar	Minister for Transport, Tourism and Sport (2011–2014); Minister for Health (2014–2016); Minister for Social Protection (2016–2017); Minister for Enterprise, Trade and Employment (2020–2022); Tánaiste (2020–2022)	Minister for Defence (2017–2020)
15	Micheál Martin	Minister for Education and Science (1997–2000); Minister for Health and Children (2000–2004); Minister for Enterprise, Trade and Employment (2004–2008); Minister for Foreign Affairs (2008–2011); Minister for Foreign Affairs (2022–2025); Minister for Defence (2022–2025); Tánaiste (2022–2025)	Minister for Agriculture, Food and the Marine (July 2020 and Aug. 2020)
16	Simon Harris	Minister for Health (2016–2020); Minister for Justice (2022–2023); Minister for Further and Higher Education, Research, Innovation and Science (2020–2024); Tánaiste (2025–present); Minister for Foreign Affairs and Trade (2025); Minister for Defence (2025); Minister for Finance (2025–present)	

== Education ==
No.	Name	Second level	Third level
1	W. T. Cosgrave	St. Joseph's Secondary, Fairview	None
2	Éamon de Valera	C.B.S. Charleville; Blackrock College	Royal University of Ireland; Trinity College Dublin (attended)
3	John A. Costello	St. Joseph's Secondary, Fairview; O'Connell School	University College Dublin
4	Seán Lemass	O'Connell School	University College Cork
5	Jack Lynch	North Monastery	University College Cork; King's Inns
6	Liam Cosgrave	Synge Street CBS; Castleknock College	King's Inns
7	Charles Haughey	St. Joseph's Secondary, Fairview	University College Dublin
8	Garret FitzGerald	Belvedere College	University College Dublin
9	Albert Reynolds	Summerhill College	None
10	John Bruton	Clongowes Wood College	University College Dublin; King's Inns
11	Bertie Ahern	St Aidan's C.B.S.	College of Commerce, Rathmines
12	Brian Cowen	Cistercian College, Roscrea	University College Dublin; Law Society of Ireland
13	Enda Kenny	St Gerald's College, Castlebar	St Patrick's College, Dublin; University College Galway
14	Leo Varadkar	The King's Hospital	Trinity College Dublin
15	Micheál Martin	Coláiste Chríost Rí	University College Cork
16	Simon Harris	St David's Holy Faith, Greystones	Dublin Institute of Technology (attended)

== Living officeholders ==
There are currently five living former Taoisigh:

Taoiseach	Term of office	Date of birth
Bertie Ahern	1997–2008	12 September 1951 (age 74)
Brian Cowen	2008–2011	10 January 1960 (age 66)
Simon Harris	2024–2025	17 October 1986 (age 39)
Enda Kenny	2011–2017	24 April 1951 (age 75)
Leo Varadkar	2017–2020; 2022–2024	18 January 1979 (age 47)

== Timeline of living/deceased officeholders ==
Date	Living	Deceased	Notes
9 April 2024	6	10	Simon Harris accedes
6 February 2024	5	10	John Bruton dies
27 June 2020	6	9	Micheál Martin accedes
4 October 2017	5	9	Liam Cosgrave dies
14 June 2017	6	8	Leo Varadkar accedes
21 August 2014	5	8	Albert Reynolds dies
19 May 2011	6	7	Garret FitzGerald dies
9 March 2011	7	6	Enda Kenny accedes
7 May 2008	6	6	Brian Cowen accedes
13 June 2006	5	6	Charles Haughey dies
20 October 1999	6	5	Jack Lynch dies
26 June 1997	7	4	Bertie Ahern accedes
15 December 1994	6	4	John Bruton accedes
11 February 1992	5	4	Albert Reynolds accedes
30 June 1981	4	4	Garret FitzGerald accedes
11 December 1979	3	4	Charles Haughey accedes
6 January 1976	2	4	John A. Costello dies
29 August 1975	3	3	Éamon de Valera dies
14 March 1973	4	2	Liam Cosgrave accedes
16 May 1971	3	2	Seán Lemass dies
10 November 1966	4	1	Jack Lynch accedes
11 May 1965	3	1	W. T. Cosgrave dies
23 June 1959	4	0	Seán Lemass accedes
18 February 1948	3	0	John A. Costello accedes
9 March 1932	2	0	Éamon de Valera accedes
6 December 1922	1	0	W. T. Cosgrave accedes

== See also ==
- History of the Republic of Ireland
- List of Irish heads of government
- Politics of the Republic of Ireland
- Records of members of the Oireachtas
