= Brian Mullooly =

Irish politician (born 1935)

Cathaoirleach of Seanad Éireann
- In office 16 November 1996 – 27 November 1996
- Preceded by: Liam Naughten
- Succeeded by: Liam T. Cosgrave
- In office 17 September 1997 – 12 September 2002
- Preceded by: Liam T. Cosgrave
- Succeeded by: Rory Kiely

Senator
- In office 8 October 1981 – 12 September 2002
- Constituency: Labour Panel

Personal details
- Born: 21 February 1935 (age 91) Strokestown, County Roscommon, Ireland
- Party: Fianna Fáil
- Spouse: Nancy Mullooly
- Children: 8
- Education: St Patrick's College, Dublin

Brian Mullooly (born 21 February 1935) is an Irish former Fianna Fáil party politician known for serving as Cathaoirleach in November 1996, and from 1997 to 2002.

He was born in Strokestown, County Roscommon, and educated at Summerhill College, Sligo and at St Patrick's College, Dublin. He worked as a national school teacher before becoming involved in politics. Mullooly served in Seanad Éireann for over twenty years, holding the post of Cathaoirleach from 16 November to 27 November 1996 and from 1997 to 2002.

Oireachtas
| Preceded by Liam Naughten | Cathaoirleach of Seanad Éireann; Nov. 1996 | Succeeded by Liam T. Cosgrave |
| Preceded by Liam T. Cosgrave | Cathaoirleach of Seanad Éireann; 1997–2002 | Succeeded by Rory Kiely |
