= Liam T. Cosgrave =

Irish politician (born 1956)

Leas-Chathaoirleach of Seanad Éireann
- In office 18 September 1997 – 13 September 2002
- Cathaoirleach: Brian Mullooly
- Preceded by: Brian Mullooly
- Succeeded by: Paddy Burke

Cathaoirleach of Seanad Éireann
- In office 27 November 1996 – 17 September 1997
- Deputy: Brian Mullooly
- Preceded by: Brian Mullooly
- Succeeded by: Brian Mullooly

Senator
- In office 1 November 1989 – 12 September 2002
- Constituency: Industrial and Commercial Panel

Teachta Dála
- In office June 1981 – June 1987
- Constituency: Dún Laoghaire

Personal details
- Born: 30 April 1956 (age 70) Castleknock, Dublin, Ireland
- Party: Fine Gael
- Spouse: Ann Marie Flanigan (m. 1984)
- Children: 3
- Parents: Liam Cosgrave (father); Vera Cosgrave (mother)
- Relatives: W. T. Cosgrave (grandfather)
- Education: University College Cork; University College Dublin

Liam Thomas Cosgrave (born 30 April 1956) is an Irish former Fine Gael politician who served as Leas-Chathaoirleach of Seanad Éireann from 1997 to 2002, Cathaoirleach of Seanad Éireann from 1996 to 1997 and a Senator for the Industrial and Commercial Panel from 1993 to 2002. He previously served as a Teachta Dála (TD) for the Dún Laoghaire constituency from 1981 to 1987.

Coming from a political family, he is the son of Taoiseach Liam Cosgrave and grandson of the first President of the Executive Council W. T. Cosgrave.

== Politics ==
He was elected to Dáil Éireann at the 1981 general election as a Fine Gael TD for Dún Laoghaire, and re-elected at the February 1982 and November 1982 general elections. He lost his seat at the 1987 general election, and was unsuccessful again at the 1989 and 1992 general elections.

He was elected to Seanad Éireann in 1989 as a Senator for the Industrial and Commercial Panel, serving as Cathaoirleach, and was re-elected in 1993 and 1997. At the 2002 general election, he was again an unsuccessful candidate for the Dáil in Dún Laoghaire, and he did not contest the Seanad elections of that year.

The Mahon Tribunal, set up to investigate allegations of corruption among Irish politicians, heard in 2003 that Cosgrave had accepted illegal payments from property developers in return for voting to rezone property in Dublin. He resigned from the Fine Gael party when this became known, thereby effectively ending his political career.

He did not seek re-election to Dún Laoghaire–Rathdown County Council at the 2004 local elections.

On 17 October 2005, Cosgrave pleaded guilty to a charge of failing to disclose to the Standards in Public Office Commission a political donation of £2,500 received from lobbyist Frank Dunlop in the course of the 1997 general election. He was sentenced on 26 May 2006 to perform 75 hours of community service in lieu of a six-month custodial sentence.

== Mahon Tribunal ==
Cosgrave appeared at the Mahon Tribunal on 14 July 2006 in relation to a planning application from Monarch Properties to re-zone 236 acres (0.96 km^{2}) at Cherrywood, Dublin.

He told the Tribunal that his decision to support the re-zoning was not a U-turn in return for a political donation. But he could not recall the reason for his decision. He said that he could not recollect whether he had received any donations from Monarch, or other developers at the time; but that there could have been some.

== Criminal Assets Bureau investigation and subsequent legal actions ==
The Criminal Assets Bureau secured a High Court order preventing the sale of 107 acres (0.43 km^{2}) of land assets owned by Jackson Way Properties Ltd in Carrickmines. An investigation of corruption was being instituted on the basis of bribes allegedly paid to councillors by Frank Dunlop to secure re-zoning on 16 December 1997. The re-zoning was investigated by the Mahon Tribunal in 2003.

On 26 October 2010, Cosgrave appeared at Dublin District Court charged with five offences. He is alleged to have received corrupt payments between 1992 and 1997 in relation to the re-zoning of Jackson Way Properties Ltd.

In April 2012, he failed in his attempt to stop his trial on corruption charges. The Supreme Court upheld the High Court's decision by a majority of three to two. He went on trial in the Dublin Circuit Criminal Court on 4 July 2013, on five counts of corruptly receiving money on dates between June 1992 and December 1997.

The trial subsequently collapsed, and a nolle prosequi verdict was entered on the record.

Oireachtas
Preceded by Brian Mullooly	Cathaoirleach of Seanad Éireann; 1996–1997	Succeeded by Brian Mullooly

Dáil	Election	Deputy (Party)	Deputy (Party)	Deputy (Party)	Deputy (Party)	Deputy (Party)
21st	1977	David Andrews (FF)	Liam Cosgrave (FG)	Barry Desmond (Lab)	Martin O'Donoghue (FF)	4 seats 1977–1981
22nd	1981	David Andrews (FF)	Liam T. Cosgrave (FG)	Barry Desmond (Lab)	Martin O'Donoghue (FF)	Seán Barrett (FG)
23rd	1982 (Feb)	David Andrews (FF)	Liam T. Cosgrave (FG)	Barry Desmond (Lab)	Martin O'Donoghue (FF)	Seán Barrett (FG)
24th	1982 (Nov)	David Andrews (FF)	Liam T. Cosgrave (FG)	Barry Desmond (Lab)	Monica Barnes (FG)	Seán Barrett (FG)
25th	1987	David Andrews (FF)	Geraldine Kennedy (PDs)	Barry Desmond (Lab)	Monica Barnes (FG)	Seán Barrett (FG)
26th	1989	David Andrews (FF)	Brian Hillery (FF)	Eamon Gilmore (WP)	Monica Barnes (FG)	Seán Barrett (FG)
27th	1992	David Andrews (FF)	Helen Keogh (PDs)	Eamon Gilmore (DL)	Niamh Bhreathnach (Lab)	Seán Barrett (FG)
28th	1997	David Andrews (FF)	Monica Barnes (FG)	Eamon Gilmore (Lab)	Mary Hanafin (FF)	Seán Barrett (FG)
29th	2002	Barry Andrews (FF)	Fiona O'Malley (PDs)	Eamon Gilmore (Lab)	Mary Hanafin (FF)	Ciarán Cuffe (GP)
30th	2007	Barry Andrews (FF)	Seán Barrett (Note: Served as Ceann Comhairle in the 31st Dáil from 2011 to 2016 and was returned automatically at the 2016 general election.) (FG)	Eamon Gilmore (Lab)	Mary Hanafin (FF)	Ciarán Cuffe (GP)
31st	2011	Mary Mitchell O'Connor (FG)	Seán Barrett (FG)	Eamon Gilmore (Lab)	Richard Boyd Barrett (PBP)	4 seats from 2011
32nd	2016	Mary Mitchell O'Connor (FG)	Seán Barrett (FG)	Maria Bailey (FG)	Richard Boyd Barrett (AAA–PBP)	4 seats from 2011
33rd	2020	Jennifer Carroll MacNeill (FG)	Ossian Smyth (GP)	Cormac Devlin (FF)	Richard Boyd Barrett (S–PBP)	4 seats from 2011
34th	2024	Jennifer Carroll MacNeill (FG)	Barry Ward (FG)	Cormac Devlin (FF)	Richard Boyd Barrett (PBP–S)	4 seats from 2011
