= Vera Cosgrave =

Irish PR assistant (1926–2016)

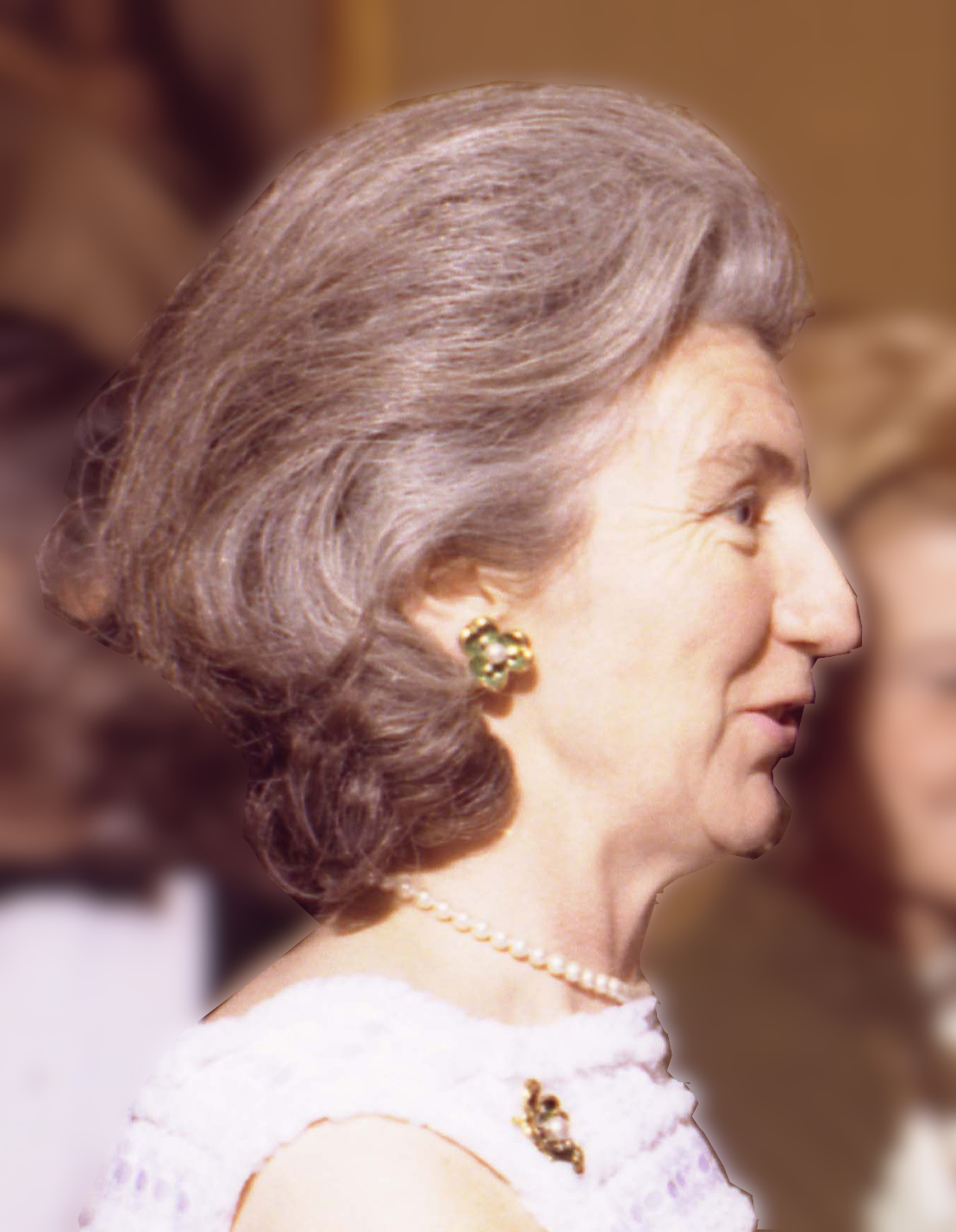
- Cosgrave in 1976
- Born: Veronica Louise Osborne; 11 March 1926; Naas, County Kildare, Ireland
- Died: 15 September 2016 (aged 90); Tallaght, Ireland
- Resting place: Goldenbridge Cemetery, Dublin, Ireland
- Education: Trinity College Dublin
- Known for: Spouse of the Taoiseach (1973‍–‍1977)
- Spouse: Liam Cosgrave (m. 1952)
- Children: 3, including Liam T.
- Relatives: W. T. Cosgrave (father-in-law)

Veronica Louise Cosgrave (née Osborne; 11 March 1926 – 15 September 2016) was an Irish public relations assistant and the wife of Liam Cosgrave, who served as Taoiseach from 1973 to 1977.

== Early life ==
Veronica Louise Osborne was born in Naas, County Kildare, on 11 March 1926. Her mother was the former Helen Cunningham. Her father, Joseph W. Osborne, was a horse trainer based at Craddoxtown House. Her brother Paddy Osborne was also a horse trainer.

== Political life ==
Osborne married Liam Cosgrave on 16 April 1952. At the time, Cosgrave was a government minister; he rose to the position of Leader of Fine Gael and Taoiseach in 1973. She accompanied him to the United States for a state visit in 1976, during the American Bicentennial. Vera Cosgrave also worked in public relations.

== Personal life ==
Vera and Liam Cosgrave had three children, including Liam T. Cosgrave, a Fine Gael politician. She died in Dublin on 15 September 2016, aged 90 years. Her gravesite is at Goldenbridge Cemetery in Inchicore.
