= Goldenbridge Cemetery =

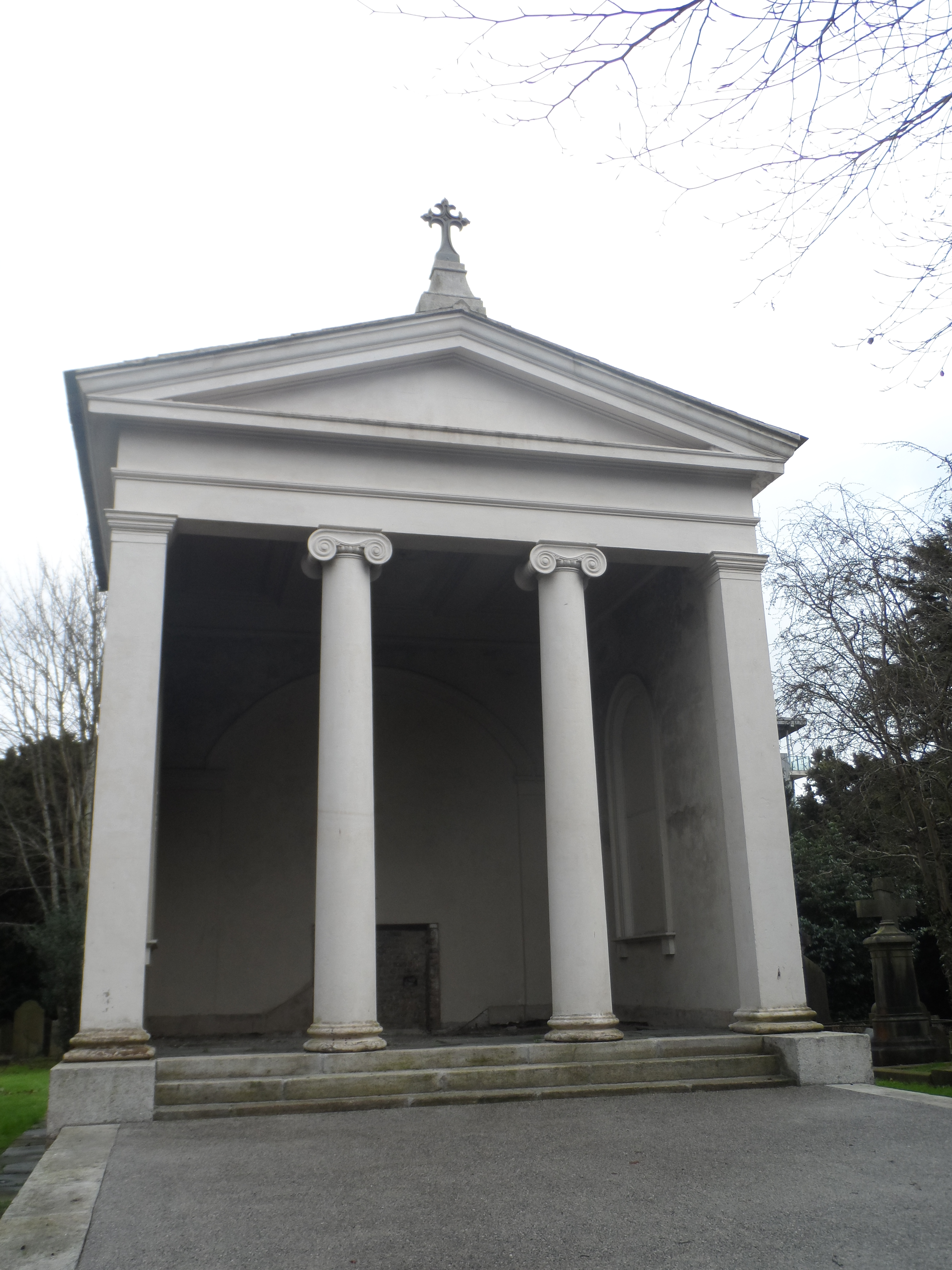
- Mortuary chapel in the form of a Roman temple
- Interactive map of Goldenbridge Cemetery

Details
- Established: 1828
- Location: St. Vincent's Street, Inchicore, Dublin
- Country: Ireland
- Coordinates: 53.336328°N 6.316816°W
- Type: Non-Denominational
- Style: garden cemetery
- Owned by: Glasnevin Trust
- Size: 1.3 hectares (3.2 acres)
- No. of graves: 1,100
- Website: www.glasnevintrust.ie/funeral-services/goldenbridge-cemetery/
- Find a Grave: Goldenbridge Cemetery

Goldenbridge Cemetery (Irish: Reilig an Droichid Órga) is a Non-Denominational garden cemetery located in Inchicore, Dublin, Ireland.

== History ==
Under the Penal Laws, Irish Catholics could only be buried in Church of Ireland (Anglican) cemeteries, and the full graveside rites could not be performed – only prayers from the (Anglican) Book of Common Prayer were permitted. Catholic emancipation came in the 1820s, and the three acres at Goldenbridge, purchased by the Catholic Association for £600, formed the first Catholic cemetery in Ireland since the Reformation. The first burial took place on 15 October 1828. A mortuary chapel in the form of a Roman temple was erected in 1829.

The cemetery was placed provocatively next to Richmond Barracks, a British Army installation. Complaints by the 92nd Regiment of Foot about noise and commotion caused by funeral processions passing their barracks led to a hearing by the Privy Council of Ireland. Abraham Brewster, Lord Chancellor of Ireland, limited future interments to those with burial rights only. Glasnevin Cemetery opened in 1832.

Mass burials took place during the Great Famine (1845–49) and during a cholera epidemic of 1867.

Until 2017, the last burial was of W. T. Cosgrave in 1965, first President of the Executive Council of the Irish Free State. His grave, along with 26 others, were vandalised in 2014 but restored in 2016. On 4 October 2017, the son of W. T. Cosgrave, Liam Cosgrave, who had been Taoiseach from 1973 to 1977 died, and was subsequently buried in the family plot at Goldenbridge on 7 October 2017.

The cemetery now forms part of a tourist attraction with nearby Richmond Barracks.

== Notable burials ==
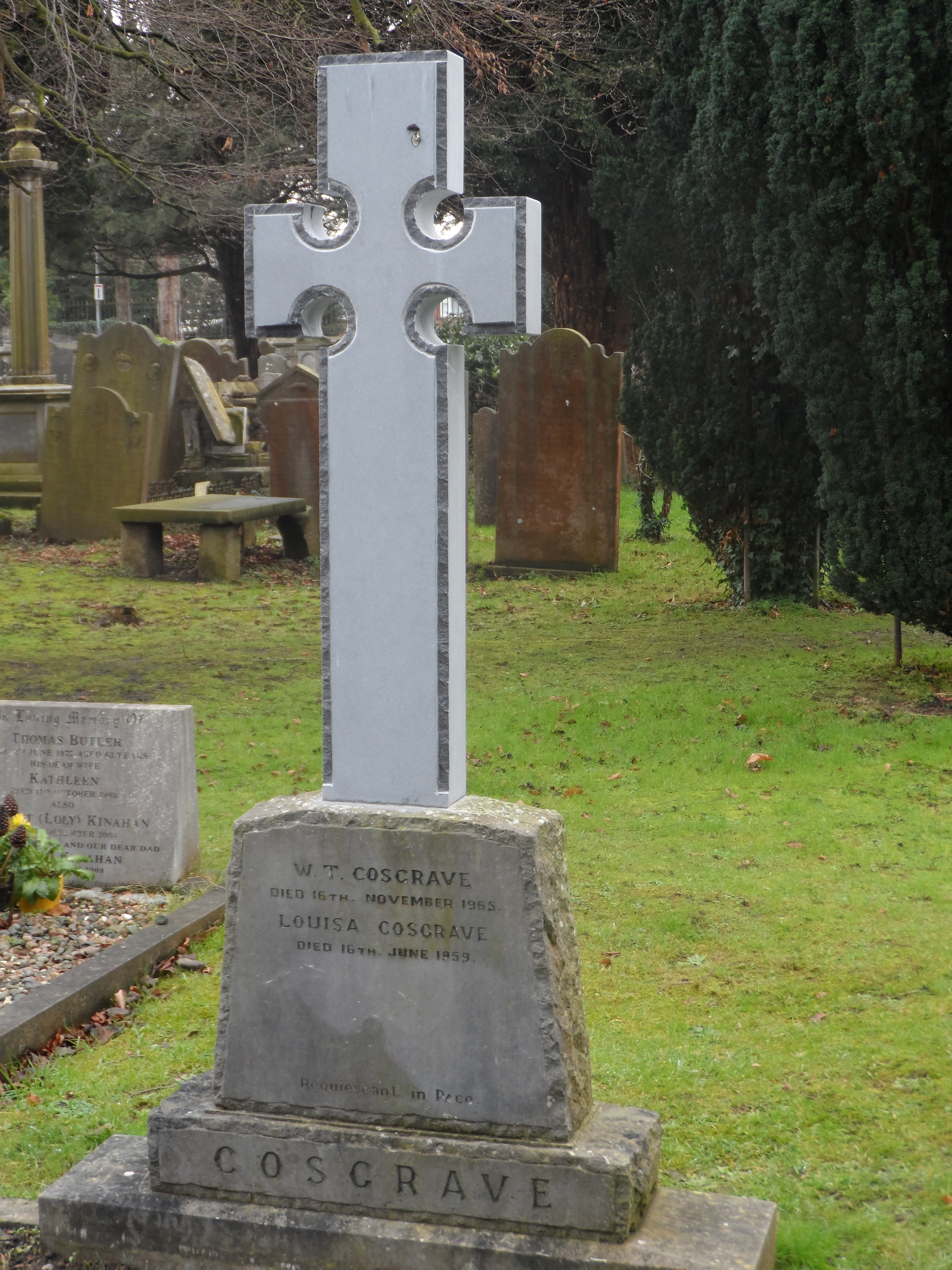
W. T. Cosgrave's tombstone

- William Francis Burke (1897–1916), member of E Company, 4th Battalion, Dublin Brigade, Irish Volunteers; killed during the Easter Rising
- Andrew Clinch (1867–1937), rugby union player; played on the 1896 British Lions tour to South Africa
- Liam Cosgrave (1920–2017), Taoiseach 1973–77
- Vera Cosgrave (1926–2016), wife of Liam
- W. T. Cosgrave (1880–1965), President of the Executive Council of the Irish Free State 1922–32
- Tom Macken (1937–2019), local artist
- Eugene Lynch (1907–1916), an eight-year-old boy killed by gunfire during the Easter Rising
