= Liam Cosgrave =

Taoiseach from 1973 to 1977

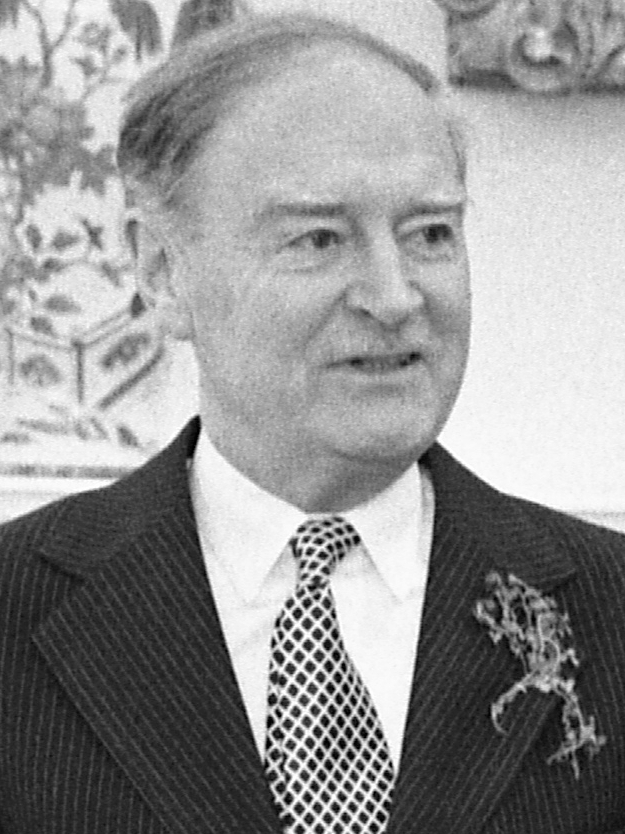
- Cosgrave in 1976

Taoiseach
- In office 14 March 1973 – 5 July 1977
- President: Éamon de Valera; Erskine H. Childers; Cearbhall Ó Dálaigh; Patrick Hillery
- Tánaiste: Brendan Corish
- Preceded by: Jack Lynch
- Succeeded by: Jack Lynch

Leader of the Opposition
- In office 21 April 1965 – 14 March 1973
- Taoiseach: Seán Lemass; Jack Lynch
- Preceded by: James Dillon
- Succeeded by: Jack Lynch

Leader of Fine Gael
- In office 21 April 1965 – 1 July 1977
- Deputy: Tom O'Higgins
- Preceded by: James Dillon
- Succeeded by: Garret FitzGerald

Minister for External Affairs
- In office 2 June 1954 – 20 March 1957
- Taoiseach: John A. Costello
- Preceded by: Frank Aiken
- Succeeded by: Frank Aiken

Parliamentary Secretary
- 1948–1951: Government Chief Whip
- 1948–1951: Industry and Commerce

Teachta Dála
- In office June 1977 – June 1981
- Constituency: Dún Laoghaire
- In office February 1948 – June 1977
- Constituency: Dún Laoghaire and Rathdown
- In office June 1943 – February 1948
- Constituency: Dublin County

Personal details
- Born: 13 April 1920 Castleknock, Dublin, Ireland
- Died: 4 October 2017 (aged 97) Tallaght, Dublin, Ireland
- Resting place: Goldenbridge Cemetery, Inchicore, Dublin, Ireland
- Party: Fine Gael
- Spouse: Vera Osborne (m. 1952; died 2016)
- Children: 3, including Liam
- Parents: W. T. Cosgrave; Louisa Flanagan
- Education: King's Inns

Liam Cosgrave (13 April 1920 – 4 October 2017) was an Irish Fine Gael politician who served as Taoiseach from 1973 to 1977, Leader of Fine Gael from 1965 to 1977, Leader of the Opposition from 1965 to 1973, Minister for External Affairs from 1954 to 1957, and Parliamentary Secretary to the Minister for Industry and Commerce and Government Chief Whip from 1948 to 1951. He served as a Teachta Dála (TD) from 1943 to 1981.

After qualifying as a barrister he began a political career. He was elected to Dáil Éireann at the 1943 general election and sat in opposition alongside his father. In the first inter-party government in 1948, Cosgrave was appointed as Parliamentary Secretary to the Taoiseach John A. Costello. He became a cabinet member in 1954 when he was appointed Minister for External Affairs. The highlight of his three-year tenure was Ireland's successful entry into the United Nations. In 1965, Cosgrave was the unanimous choice of his colleagues to succeed James Dillon as leader of Fine Gael. He lost the 1969 general election to the incumbent Taoiseach Jack Lynch, but won the 1973 general election and became Taoiseach in a Fine Gael-Labour Party government.

Cosgrave died on 4 October 2017, at the age of 97. He remains to date the longest-lived Taoiseach, and was also the last Taoiseach born before the partition of Ireland.

== Early life ==
Cosgrave was born in Castleknock, Dublin, Ireland, on 13 April 1920, during the War of Independence. He was the first of two children of W. T. Cosgrave, who would become the first President of the Executive Council in the newly formed Irish Free State, and his wife Louisa (née Flanagan).. His boyhood was shaped by the upheavals of the new Irish state. His father served as President of the Executive Council for much of his childhood, and the family bore the marks of the Civil War: in January 1923 their home at Beechpark, in Templeogue, was burned by anti-Treaty forces, and although Cosgrave was only two years old and away from home at the time, he later said he could remember the ruins. He retained happier memories, too, including accompanying his parents to the opening of the Ardnacrusha hydroelectric station in 1929, an occasion that helped instil in him a lasting identification with the institutions of the Free State; he later described the Cumann na nGaedheal government as "easily the best government of the State".

Cosgrave displayed a keen interest in politics from an early age, discussing the topic with his father as a teenager before eventually joining Fine Gael at the age of 17, speaking at his first public meeting the same year. He was educated at Synge Street CBS, a devoutly Catholic school, then later at Castleknock College, Dublin, and later at King's Inns. Before entering politics, he enlisted as a private in the Defence Forces in 1940 and was later commissioned as a second lieutenant in the reserve, serving until 1943. He studied law and was called to the Irish Bar in 1943. Faith remained central to his life, and he continued to attend daily mass at the Church of the Annunciation in Rathfarnham until a few months before his death.

== Political career ==
=== Political beginnings ===
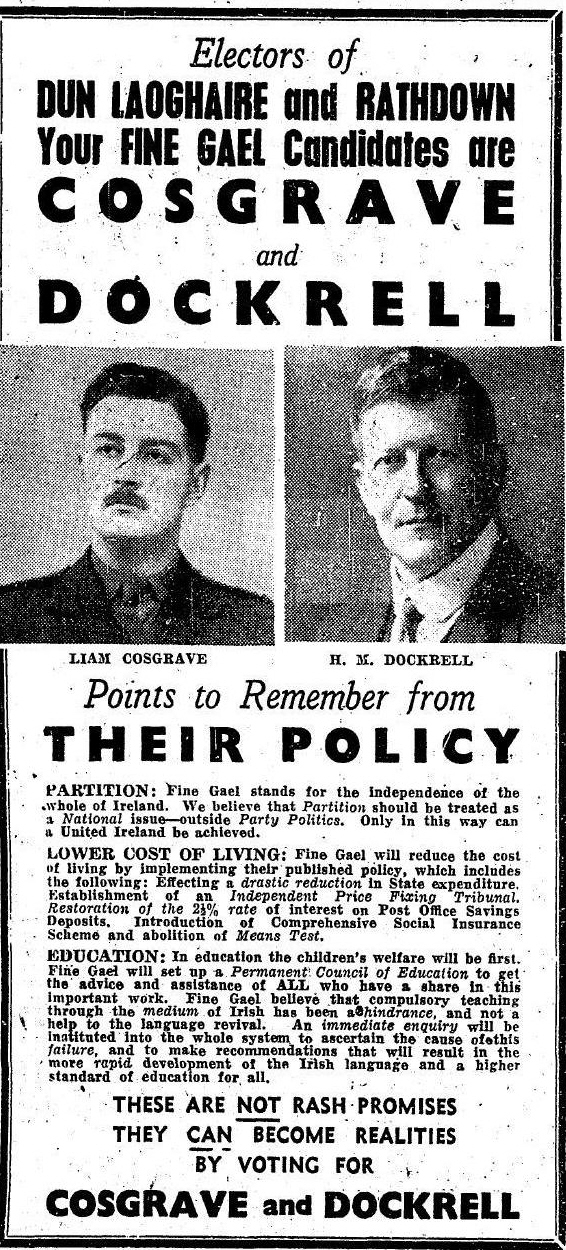
A pamphlet from the 1948 Irish general election promoting Cosgrave

To the surprise of his family, Liam sought election to Dáil Éireann in the 1943 general election and was elected as a TD for Dublin County at the age of 23, the youngest member of the Dáil at the time, sitting in the 11th Dáil alongside his father W. T. Cosgrave, one of the founders of the Irish Free State in the 1920s. The two shared the opposition benches until W. T. Cosgrave retired at the snap election of 1944. Cosgrave rapidly rose through the ranks of Fine Gael and was regarded as being by far the most able and active of Fine Gael's newer TDs. His election in 1943 occurred during a long period when his party was in opposition, from 1932 to 1948.

Cosgrave wrote to the Party Leader, Richard Mulcahy, in May 1947, on the poor attendance in the Dáil, and informed his leader that "I cannot any longer conscientiously ask the public to support the party as a party, and in the circumstances I do not propose to speak at meetings outside my constituency." Nevertheless, the 1948 general election brought Fine Gael to power for the first time since the party's foundation in 1933, in coalition with the Labour Party, the National Labour Party, Clann na Talmhan, Clann na Poblachta and six independents, ending sixteen years of Fianna Fáil rule. At the same election Cosgrave was returned for the newly created constituency of Dún Laoghaire and Rathdown, a seat he would go on to hold at every subsequent election until his retirement in 1981. When the First Inter-Party government was formed, Taoiseach John A. Costello nominated Cosgrave for appointment by the government as Parliamentary Secretary to the Taoiseach and Chief Whip and as Parliamentary Secretary to the Minister for Industry and Commerce on 24 February 1948. He served in these positions until the dissolution of the Dáil on 7 May 1951.

=== Minister ===
After the 1954 general election, a Second Inter-Party government was formed on 2 June 1954, led again by John A. Costello. Cosgrave, then only 34 but with eleven years of Dáil experience, was appointed to the position of Minister for External Affairs. Cosgrave took part in trade discussions and chaired the Committee of Ministers of the Council of Europe in 1955. He also presided over Ireland's admission to the United Nations, which took place on 14 December 1955. Cosgrave outlined the three principles of his foreign policy to the Dáil in June 1956: adherence to the principles of the UN Charter, independence and non-alignment, and "to do whatever we can as a member of the UN to preserve the Christian civilisation of which we are a part and with that end in view to support whenever possible those powers principally responsible for the defence of the free world in their resistance to the spread of communist power and influence". Ireland was non-aligned in favour of the United States. The second Inter-Party government collapsed amid severely deflationary policies set by the Minister for Finance, Gerard Sweetman. Cosgrave held Sweetman personally responsible for Fine Gael's defeat at the 1957 general election, and told him so, reportedly stating that Fine Gael "was no longer led by people living in big houses at the end of long avenues." He did not speak to Sweetman for some years. Although the collapse of the government and the defeat cut short his ministerial career, his record in office had enhanced his reputation and established his credentials as a future party leader.

=== Opposition ===
Despondency grew within Fine Gael during its long spell in opposition after 1957, though the period also prompted introspection within the party. In an effort to revitalise Fine Gael, Declan Costello, son of the former Taoiseach John A. Costello, drew up a set of proposals known as the Just Society document, built on the principles of equality and social justice and calling for higher state spending on health and social welfare alongside a greater state role in the economy. The document divided the party, but the veteran TD Patrick McGilligan lent it credibility by urging colleagues to embrace its vision.

Cosgrave privately supported Fianna Fáil's referendum to abolish the system of proportional representation in June 1959, which was defeated. This stance counted against him later that year, when the dual leadership of Fine Gael, held by Mulcahy and Costello, stood down in October 1959. Costello, who wished to continue his practice as a senior counsel as well as being a leader, had asked Cosgrave to be his "managing director" in the Dáil while he was absent on legal work, which Cosgrave declined to do. James Dillon and Cosgrave contested the resulting leadership election, with Dillon decisively elected.

With Fine Gael in opposition through the 1960s, Cosgrave committed himself to the Just Society document after his election, making a decisive intervention in the party's internal debate over the proposals when he told the 1964 Ard Fheis that it was "a well-known political maxim that a party to secure and retain public support should be slightly to the left of centre." Although the drafting of the document was carried out largely by Declan Costello, Cosgrave chaired the committee that produced its final text, and his backing, coming from a figure closely associated with the party's traditional values, proved critical to its acceptance. "Towards a Just Society" became the theme of Fine Gael's 1965 general election campaign, but a divided leadership and limited promotion of the policy undermined its impact, and Fianna Fáil went on to win the 1965 general election.

=== Fine Gael leader ===
When James Dillon resigned as leader of Fine Gael after the 1965 election loss, Cosgrave was an obvious successor and was unanimously elected at a meeting of the parliamentary party on 21 April 1965. At forty-five, he became the party's youngest-ever leader and, uniquely, followed his own father into the role. He was also elected party president that October, though the occasion was overshadowed by his father's death the following month. Cosgrave's political judgement was regarded as shrewd and his ambition for the party clear, but he belonged to an older, more formal political generation, cautious in manner and uneasy in front of a television camera; publicly, he was often considered rigid and remote.

The first year of his leadership brought Fine Gael close to a notable success, when its candidate Tom O'Higgins ran the incumbent Éamon de Valera close in the 1966 presidential election, a result that lifted party morale considerably. That momentum was not sustained. By late 1968, doubts had begun to circulate about Cosgrave's leadership over his handling of a further Fianna Fáil referendum to abolish proportional representation. Although he had previously been a vocal critic of such a move, Cosgrave came to believe that abolition would offer Fine Gael its best chance of winning power and favoured supporting the government's proposal, a position not shared by the wider party, which ultimately campaigned against it. Fine Gael fought the 1969 general election under the "Just Society" banner once more, but with little work done to develop the policy or build public support for it since 1965, it made no impact on voters, and Cosgrave lost to the incumbent Taoiseach Jack Lynch.

Cosgrave's fortunes changed in 1970. Acting on advance information implicating senior Fianna Fáil figures in a plot to import arms intended for the Provisional IRA, and having consulted trusted colleagues, he disclosed what he knew to Lynch, then Taoiseach; the disclosure was later acknowledged by Lynch in the Dáil and was central to the dismissal of Charles Haughey and Neil Blaney from government. Cosgrave denounced the Arms Crisis as the gravest scandal since independence, spoke of his fear of civil conflict, and demanded that Lynch himself resign. The Fianna Fáil government survived, but Cosgrave's measured handling of the affair strengthened his authority as a leader who put the security of the state first.

That authority was tested again by the growing liberal wing of Fine Gael, which was opposing the government's stringent security laws on civil liberty grounds, almost costing Cosgrave his leadership. The Fianna Fáil government's Offences Against the State Bill of 1972, intended to strengthen the state's powers against the IRA, was opposed by most of Cosgrave's own party, but he backed it on national security grounds, guided by his sense of duty to the state and by his father's legacy. Colleagues tried to persuade him to change course, and his refusal to do so, described as "characteristically rigid", raised a real possibility that he would become the first Fine Gael leader ousted by his own party. At the Fine Gael Ard Fheis in May 1972, Cosgrave faced down his political opponents. In a speech littered with references to Fine Gael's founding fathers, he contrasted the difficulties posed by the IRA in Northern Ireland with those faced by the first Free State government in dealing with the anti-treatyites. Departing from his script, Cosgrave rounded on his leadership rivals. Asking delegates if they did any hunting, Cosgrave declared that "… some of these commentators and critics are now like mongrel foxes; they are gone to ground but I'll dig them out, and the pack will chop them when they get them". Though criticised for taking a "partitionist" or unionist stance in his speech, Cosgrave's position was vindicated when loyalist bombs exploded in Dublin in November and December 1972, in the midst of the Dáil's debates on the bill, causing the party to coalesce behind him. Cosgrave supported the government's Offences Against the State (Amendment) Bill in November 1972, despite the position officially taken by Fine Gael to oppose the Bill. He led Fine Gael to office a year later.

== Taoiseach (1973–1977) ==
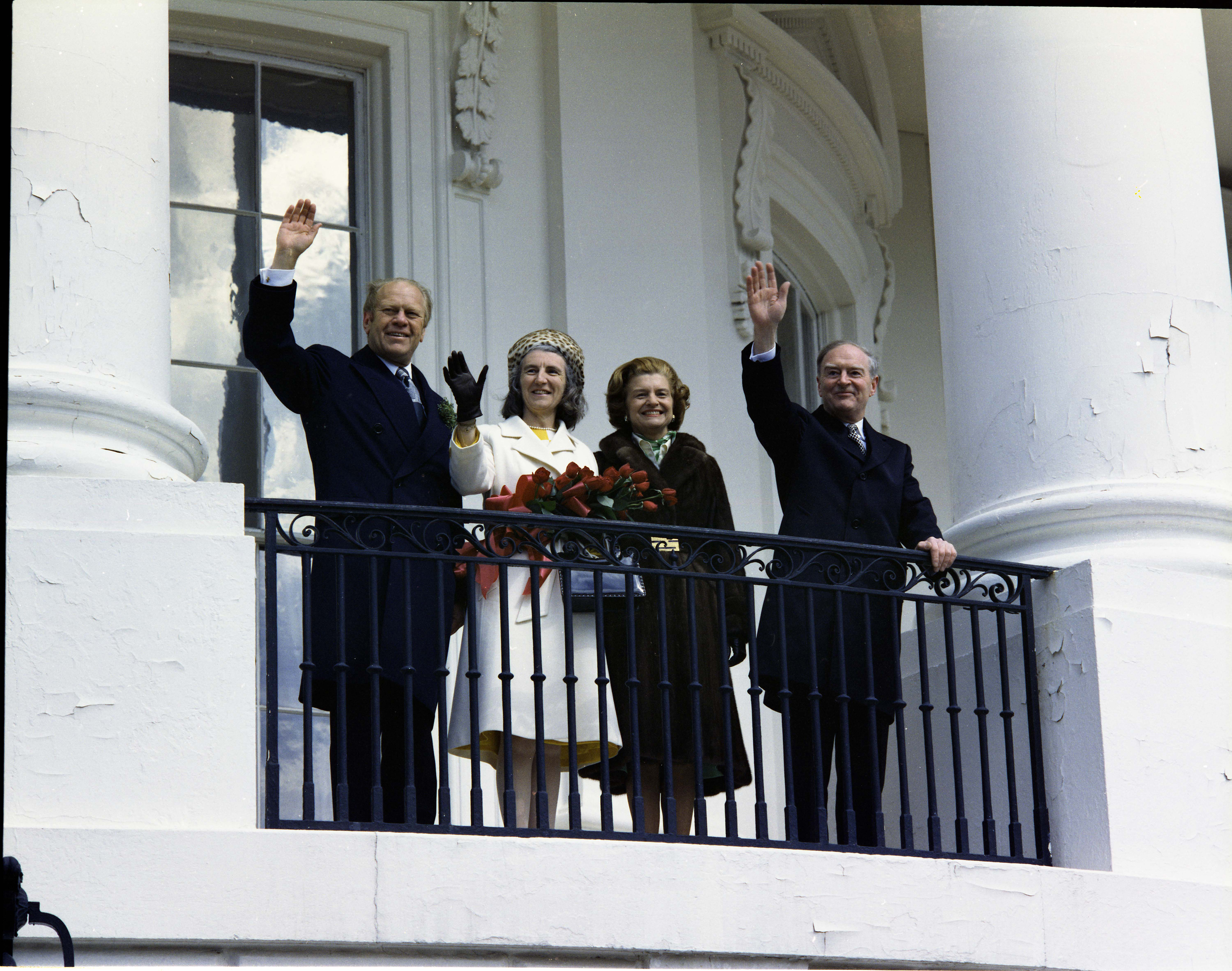
Cosgrave and Vera Cosgrave with US President Gerald Ford and Betty Ford in 1976

The 1973 general election left Fianna Fáil with sixty-nine seats to Fine Gael's fifty-four and Labour's nineteen, but a steady transfer of votes between the two opposition parties delivered a coalition government, the National Coalition, formed on 14 March 1973, when Cosgrave was elected Taoiseach with Brendan Corish of the Labour Party as Tánaiste. It was the first time in sixteen years that voters had been offered a genuine alternative to Fianna Fáil. The two parties ran a co-ordinated campaign under the banner "support the national coalition" and produced a fourteen-point programme promising to reduce the cost of living, an attractive package in an election dominated by the economy. Although Labour had anticipated disagreement over cabinet allocations, Cosgrave set a co-operative tone from the outset, offering the party five ministerial seats, exceeding its proportional entitlement, and he and Corish developed a good working relationship that helped the coalition project an image of cohesion.

He adhered to the implementation of the Fourteen Point Plan on which the National Coalition was elected. Among the government ministers were future Taoiseach and writer Garret FitzGerald, former United Nations diplomat Conor Cruise O'Brien, and television presenter and veterinary professor Justin Keating. Cosgrave balanced these with hardline Christian Democrats such as Richard Burke, former teacher Peter Barry and west Dublin farmer Mark Clinton. He appointed Richie Ryan rather than Garret FitzGerald as his Minister for Finance when Brendan Corish declined the position in 1973. Ryan, a Dublin solicitor, was of typically conservative Fine Gael stock. Nevertheless, Ryan (dubbed "Red Richie" by Fianna Fáil) implemented the Coalition's plans to replace death duties with a range of capital taxes, including Capital Gains Tax and Wealth Tax. Fianna Fáil strongly opposed these new capital taxes and garnered considerable support from the wealthy and propertied classes as a result, which would stand them in good stead in future elections.

In his first interview as Taoiseach, Cosgrave named social welfare reform as a key priority, and significant strides followed in the government's first budget, which expanded welfare provision for the elderly, people with disabilities, unmarried mothers and deserted wives, broadening the state's recognition of more diverse family structures. The world energy crisis triggered by the Yom Kippur War in October 1973, however, caused inflationary problems that soon disrupted the government's progressive plans and constrained the coalition fiscally.

=== Northern Ireland ===
In a speech at Blackrock, Co. Dublin, soon after taking office, Cosgrave called for recognition of the rights of both communities in Northern Ireland to shape institutions capable of delivering peace, a statement the unionist leader Brian Faulkner hailed as the most important made by a Taoiseach in years. The Government signed the Sunningdale Agreement in December 1973, an attempt to resolve political troubles in Northern Ireland. A power-sharing executive was set up and a Council of Ireland was to be established. Though the institutions established under the Agreement collapsed in May 1974 as a consequence of the Ulster Workers' Council Strike, the initiative later helped lay the groundwork for the Good Friday Agreement of 1998. Kidnapping threats had already prompted enhanced protection for government ministers from 1973.

Many Republican voters were angered by what they saw as Cosgrave's harsh line on the Provisional IRA and the handling of the Dublin and Monaghan bombings of May 1974, in which thirty-four people, including an unborn baby, were killed by loyalist bombs, the gravest single atrocity of the Troubles in the Republic. The Fine Gael senator Billy Fox had already been killed by republican paramilitaries on 11 March 1974.

The 2003 Barron report on the Dublin and Monaghan bombings noted that the Fine Gael/Labour government of the time "showed little interest in the bombings" and did not do enough to help the investigation. "When information was given to them suggesting that the British authorities had intelligence naming the bombers, this was not followed up". It failed to put political pressure on the British government to secure better co-operation from the RUC. It was also alleged that the Fine Gael/Labour government caused or allowed the Garda investigation to end prematurely, for fear that the findings would play into the hands of republicans. However, the Inquiry had insufficient evidence the investigation was stopped as a result of political interference.

Both The Irish Times and the Irish Press, which was edited by Tim Pat Coogan, were extremely critical of the government's curtailment of freedom of speech, in particular the use against the IRA of Section 31 of the Broadcasting Act by the Minister for Posts and Telegraphs, Conor Cruise O'Brien. Coogan declared what he dubbed "editorial war" on the government after a, now notorious, interview between Bernard Nossiter of The Washington Post and O'Brien in August 1976 regarding the passage of the Emergency Powers Bill. During the course of the interview, O'Brien stated that he would've liked the bill to be used against teachers who glorified Irish revolutionaries and against newspaper editors who published letters in support of Republicans. The coalition attempted to prosecute The Irish Press for its coverage of the maltreatment of republican prisoners by the Garda "Heavy Gang", allegations the government officially denied, with the paper winning the case. Cosgrave was accused of taking an anti-republican or pro-unionist line on Northern Ireland.

The British Ambassador to Ireland, Christopher Ewart-Biggs, was assassinated by the IRA on 21 July 1976, prompting the government to introduce the Emergency Powers Bill, which extended detention powers for suspected terrorists to up to seven days; the measure was welcomed by those demanding a tougher response to paramilitary violence but opposed by civil liberties groups. Elsewhere, the government blocked IRA efforts to make propaganda of the deaths of hunger strikers Michael Gaughan (1974) and Frank Stagg (1976), and it refused to negotiate when the Dutch industrialist Tiede Herrema was kidnapped in 1975.

=== Contraception ===
In December 1973, the Supreme Court ruled, in the case of McGee v Attorney General, that the ban on the importation of contraceptives by married persons was unconstitutional, recognising a constitutional right to marital privacy that extended to the use of contraceptives. Pressure for reform, already sought by the Irish Family Planning Association, intensified as a result, and Patrick Cooney, the Minister for Justice, introduced the Control of Importation, Sale and Manufacture of Contraceptives Bill 1974 that July, to allow married couples to obtain contraceptives on prescription. Fianna Fáil opposed any liberalisation of the law on family planning and opposed the bill in the Dáil on grounds of protection of public morality and health.

Although narrow in scope, the bill conflicted with Cosgrave's Catholic beliefs, and his office had received a stream of correspondence from concerned citizens urging him to oppose it. With no party whip applied, Cosgrave, without warning, crossed the floor to help defeat the bill in the summer of 1974, joined by six other Fine Gael TDs, including the Minister for Education, Richard Burke.. The move stunned his own party members. The episode reinforced Cosgrave's reputation for uncompromising conviction, but it also weakened the government's standing on women's issues, coming as it did alongside a government request to the EEC for a derogation on the introduction of equal pay, a prerequisite of Ireland's EEC membership.

=== Clashes with the Presidency ===
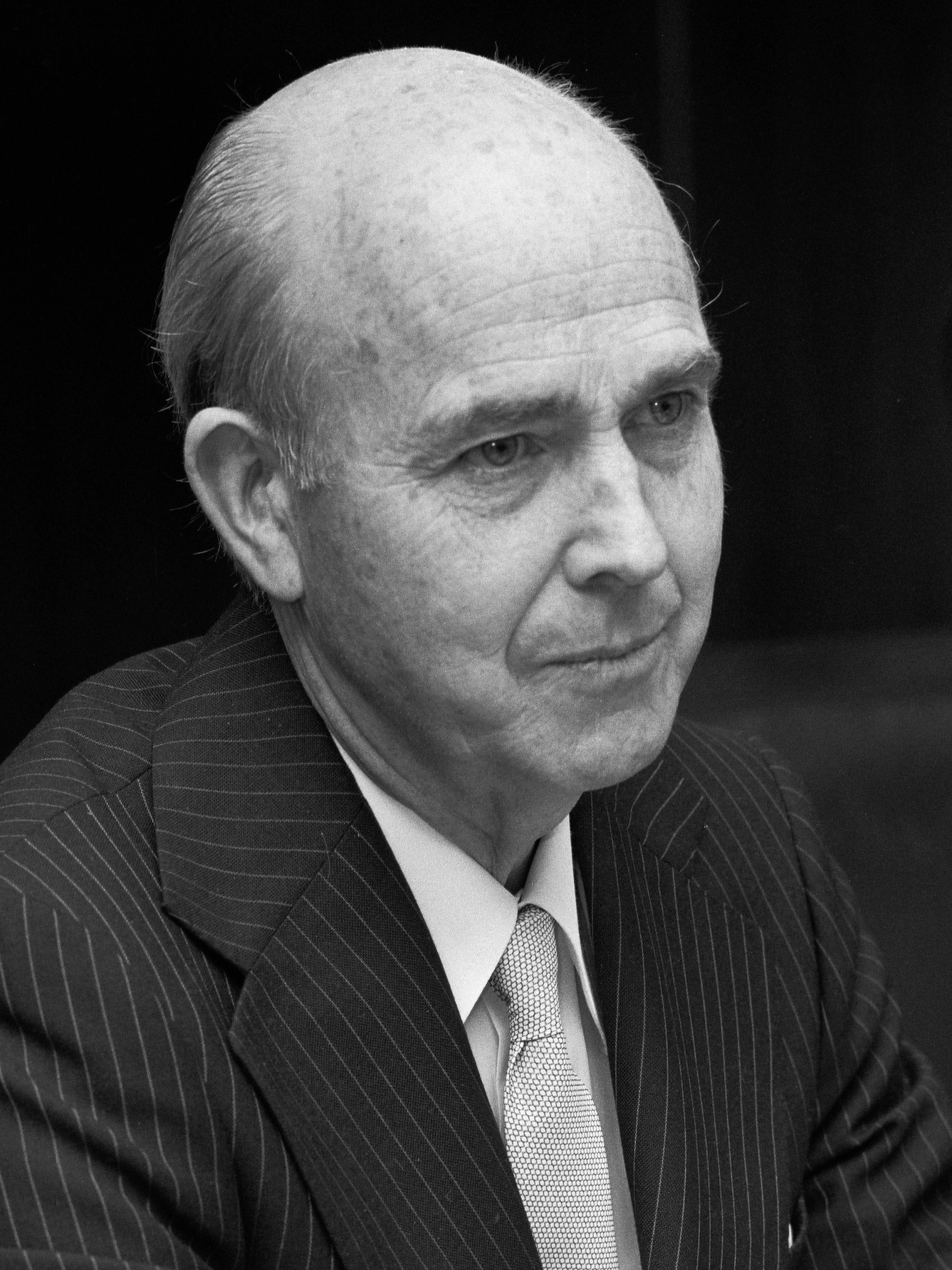
President Cearbhall Ó Dálaigh resigned during Cosgrave's tenure as Taosieach.

The coalition suffered an early electoral defeat in the 1973 presidential election, when Fine Gael candidate Tom O'Higgins was defeated by the Fianna Fáil candidate, Erskine H. Childers. Childers had sought the presidency with promises of making the office more open and hands-on, in particular with plans to create a think tank within Áras an Uachtaráin to develop an outline for Ireland's future. Cosgrave refused to allow it, and frustrated Childers' plans to break with the restrained precedent of his office.

Childers died suddenly in November 1974. His successor Cearbhall Ó Dálaigh, a former Chief Justice of Ireland and former Attorney General of Ireland, was an agreed candidate in an unopposed election. Ó Dálaigh was identified with Fianna Fáil, and believed Cosgrave was not conscientious enough in keeping him informed of political developments, the two men's contrasting personalities doing little to ease the relationship. Ó Dálaigh was also a noted critic of the curtailment of free speech and was highly critical of the introduction of Section 31 of the Broadcasting Act, which put him at odds with Cosgrave, whose government had strengthened the Act. Cosgrave also briefed President Ó Dálaigh only once every six months, which was, in the President's opinion, too infrequently as well as too inadequately.

Tensions rose further in October 1975 over the canonisation of Oliver Plunkett in Rome, to which both men had been invited. Amid disagreement over the rank of those who should form the official delegation and sensitivities relating to Northern Ireland, the government did not approve Ó Dálaigh's request to attend, and Cosgrave went in his place, fuelling speculation that the President was being sidelined on an occasion that mattered greatly to the devoutly Catholic Taoiseach. In similar fashion, Cosgrave frequently interfered in Ó Dálaigh's constitutional role as the state's representative to foreign governments; he was not permitted to receive the Legion of Honour from France, although former president Seán T. O'Kelly had previously received it, and Cosgrave attended the United States' bicentennial celebrations in 1976 in Ó Dálaigh's place.

The government had introduced the Emergency Powers Bill following the assassination in July of Christopher Ewart-Biggs by the IRA; it had passed the Dáil on 21 September. After consultation with the Council of State, Ó Dálaigh exercised his power to refer the Bill to the Supreme Court two days later to test its constitutionality, bringing him into more direct conflict with the government. Although the Court ruled that the Bill was constitutional, and Ó Dálaigh signed the Bill into law on 16 October, an IRA action on the same day in Mountmellick resulted in the death of a member of the Garda, Michael Clerkin. Cosgrave's government, already infuriated, blamed Ó Dálaigh's delaying enactment of the bill for Clerkin's murder. On 18 October, Minister for Defence Paddy Donegan attacked the President for sending the bill to the Supreme Court, calling him a "thundering disgrace", a remark whose insult carried particular weight given that Donegan held the defence portfolio and that the President was, under the Constitution, the titular commander-in-chief of the Defence Forces.

Cosgrave called Ó Dálaigh to inform him of Donegan's speech, but refused to meet with him in person to discuss the matter, partly due to his dislike for Ó Dálaigh's Fianna Fáil links and perceived pretensions, fuelling the president's anger. He refused to receive Donegan when he came to personally apologise, his handling of the affair later characterised as a "clumsy defence" of his minister. When Cosgrave then refused to accept Donegan's resignation, this proved the last straw for Ó Dálaigh, who resigned on 22 October 1976 "to protect the dignity and independence of the presidency as an institution". Fianna Fáil subsequently moved a motion of no confidence in the government over the affair; the coalition survived the vote, but the episode damaged its standing and was widely read as evidence of Cosgrave's inflexibility, his insistence on backing his minister interpreted as placing party loyalty above respect for the office of the presidency.

=== Economic measures ===
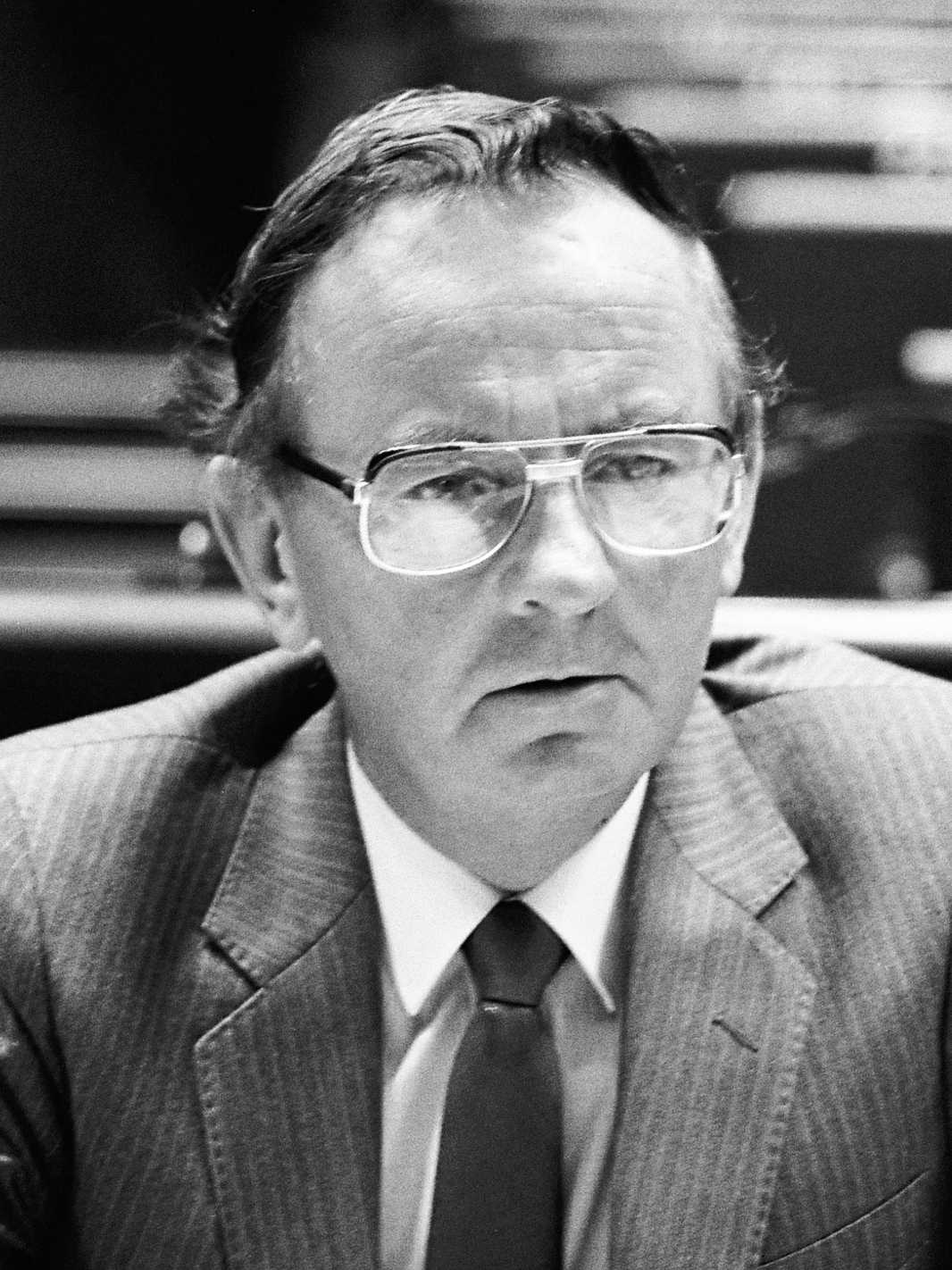
Cosgrave's Finance Minister Richie Ryan was villianised as "Richie Ruin" for imposing austerity measures

The Cosgrave government's tough austerity measures alienated the public. Finance Minister Richie Ryan was nicknamed "Richie Ruin" and cast as the "minister for hardship" on the satirical television programme Hall's Pictorial Weekly, with sketches sometimes showing him working by candlelight, a Dickensian image underscoring the austerity of the era; Cosgrave himself was depicted as rigid and stern, feeding existing public perceptions of him. Marginal income tax rates came to 77 per cent one year. The electorate had not experienced unemployment and hardship of this nature since the 1950s, and the Government became quite unpopular. The hard-line approach to law and order, and the economic difficulties, were quite damaging to Cosgrave and Corish's popularity. Despite the strain, the coalition oversaw the building of more than 100,000 new houses over the course of its term.

=== Welfare measures ===
In the field of social security, a number of important reforms in welfare provision were introduced during Cosgrave's premiership. In 1974, sickness insurance, unemployment insurance, and occupational injuries coverage were extended to all employees, while earnings-related components were added to the basic flat-rate sickness benefit, the basic flat-rate short-term occupational injury benefit, and the basic flat-rate unemployment benefit. That same year, pension insurance was extended to all employees, and a means-tested allowance for the wives of prisoners was introduced. In addition, welfare benefits were increased by 125% during the course of Cosgrave's premiership.

=== Final years as Taoiseach ===
Cosgrave delivered his final address as Fine Gael leader at the party's Ard Fheis in May, on the eve of the 1977 general election. He linked the government's security measures to those taken by his father's administrations in the 1920s, declaring, "Not for the first time has this party stood between the people of this country and anarchy", before making a strong attack on "blow-ins" who could "blow out or blow up". This was taken to be an attack on the British-born political writer Bruce Arnold, of the Irish Independent newspaper, who had been vociferously opposed to Cosgrave's policies, particularly regarding the President and the wealth tax, an interpretation later favoured over the alternative reading that it targeted Kader Asmal, founder of the Irish Anti-Apartheid Movement and the Irish Council for Civil Liberties. While the Fine Gael grassroots loved it, it attracted wider criticism and backfired politically.

James Tully, the Labour Minister for Local Government, had redrawn the constituency boundaries (the "Tullymander") and had expected that the new boundaries would favour the two government parties. Dublin, apart from Dún Laoghaire, was divided into some 13 three-seat constituencies where Fine Gael and Labour were to take one seat each, reducing Fianna Fáil to a minority rump in the capital.

Despite the economic difficulties and mounting criticism, a general perception persisted, fostered by the press, that the National Coalition would be re-elected; a top-secret cabinet memorandum, however, warned that it would be self-deluding to believe success was guaranteed, citing inflation, farmer incomes and unemployment levels as key challenges. The election campaign started without Cosgrave taking any opinion polls in advance and was therefore unaware of the extent of Fianna Fáil's support. Only after the government requested an early dissolution in May 1977 did the coalition parties commission polling of their own, which predicted defeat. Fianna Fáil ran a professional, well-organised campaign that had many of the trappings of American electioneering. Party leader Jack Lynch undertook an energetic, presidential-style tour of the country, carefully co-ordinated with the media, while by contrast little prior notice was given of where Cosgrave would be visiting. The government parties initially opted to stand on their record, and it was only after Fianna Fáil launched a glittering forty-seven-page manifesto, Action Plan for National Reconstruction, promising among other things the abolition of rates and the car tax, that the coalition partners hurried to produce a document of their own. Despite its title, Programme for Progress mostly comprised the government's achievements and criticisms of Fianna Fáil.

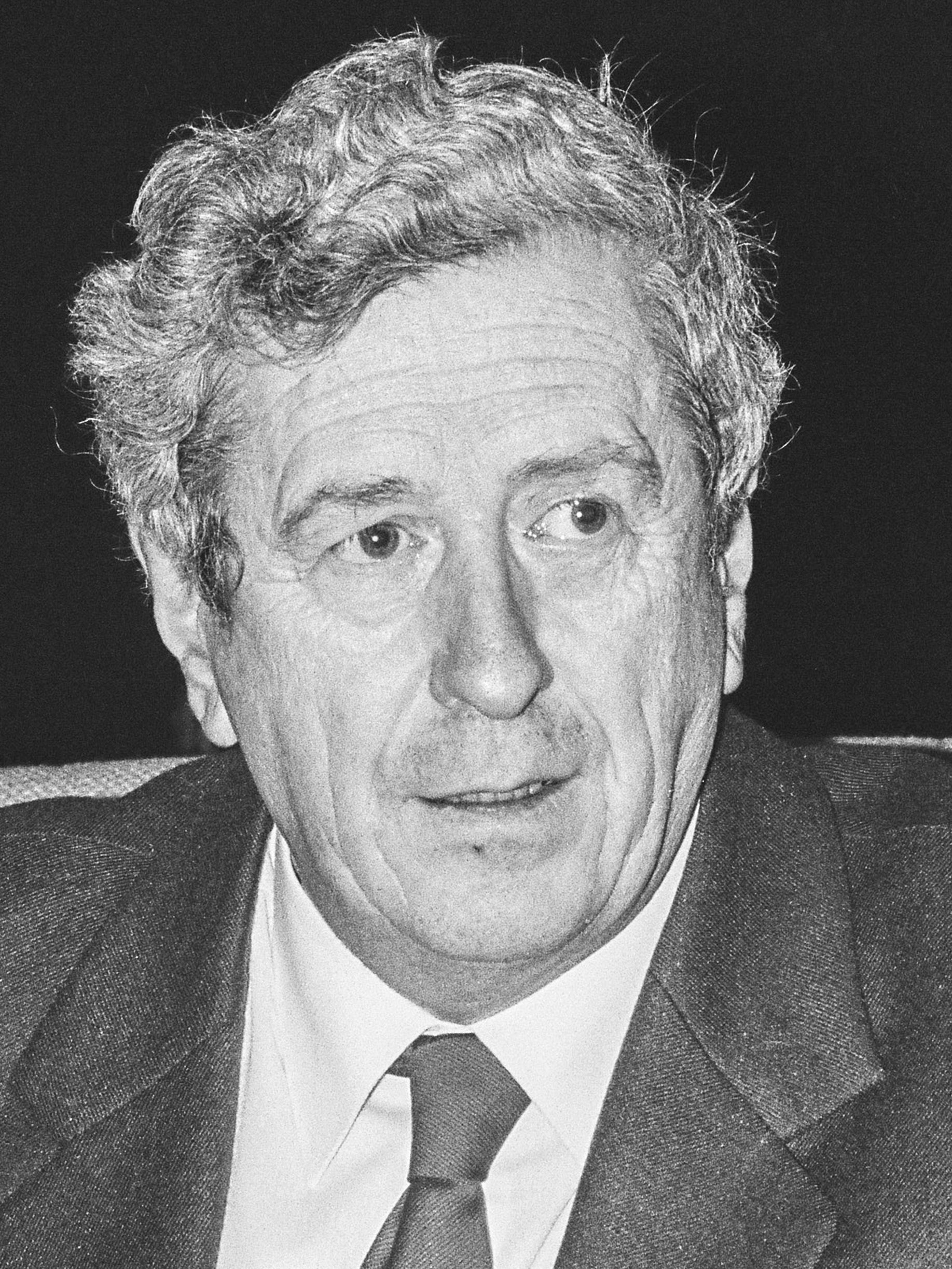
Garret FitzGerald, who had been Cosgrave's Minister for Foreign Affairs, succeeded him as leader of Fine Gael.

The electorate responded positively to Fianna Fáil's campaign, and the party was returned to power, with an unprecedentedly large parliamentary majority, including unexpected second seats in many Dublin constituencies. The results were disastrous for Fine Gael, which lost nineteen seats and was left without a single TD in four constituencies. In the immediate aftermath, Liam Cosgrave resigned as Fine Gael leader, to be succeeded by Garret FitzGerald; Brendan Corish also resigned as leader of the Labour Party. Cosgrave retired at the 1981 general election.

== Post-Taoiseach ==
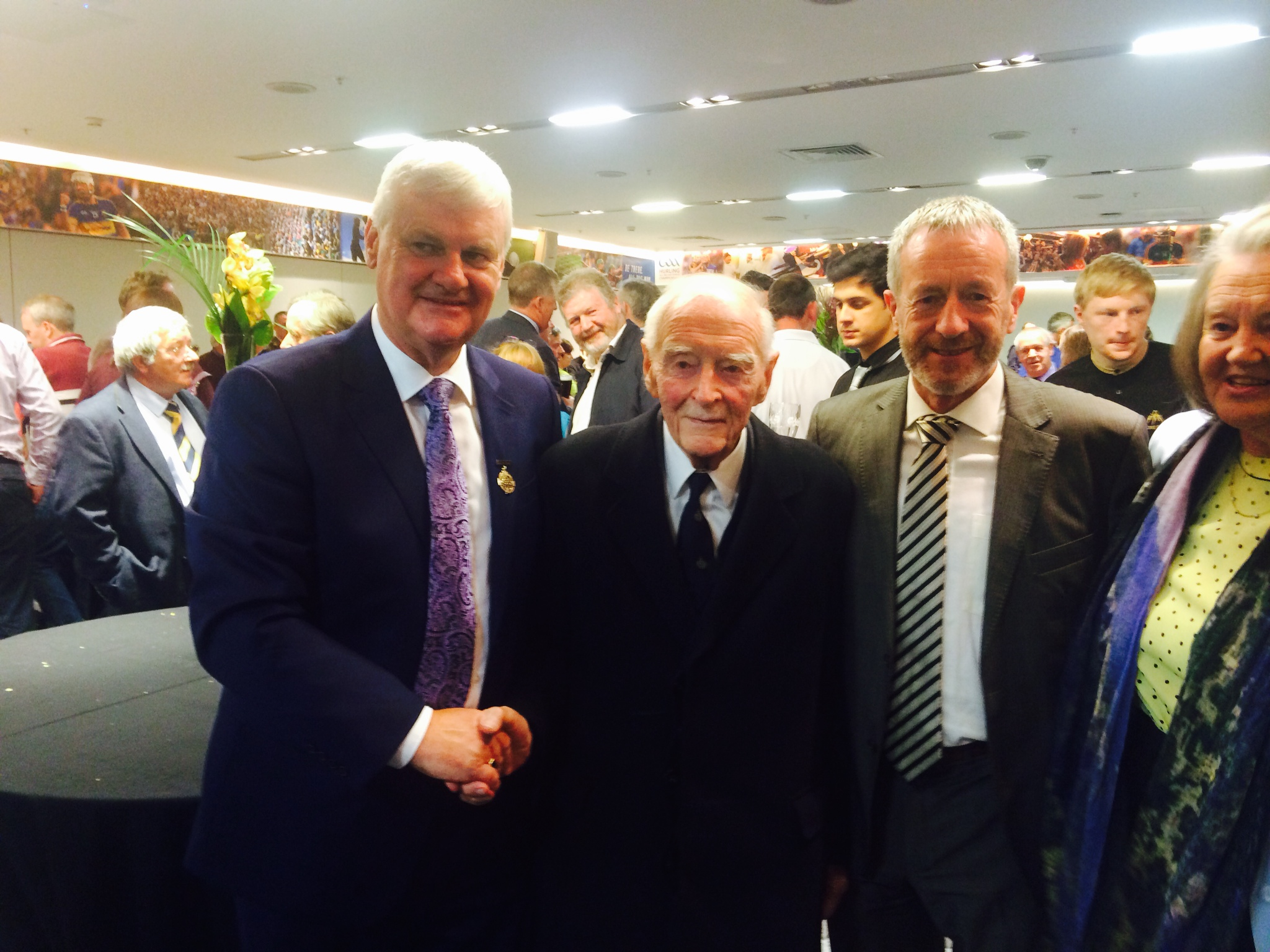
Cosgrave with Seán Kelly and Aogán Ó Fearghail in 2015

In 1981, at the age of sixty-one and after a Dáil career spanning almost four decades, Cosgrave retired as Dáil Deputy for Dún Laoghaire, being replaced by his son, Liam T. Cosgrave. He largely withdrew from public life thereafter, though he continued to make occasional appearances and speeches, usually connected to commemorations of his father; in October 2010 he attended the launch of The Reluctant Taoiseach, a book about former Taoiseach John A. Costello written by David McCullagh. He also appeared in public for the Centenary of the Easter Rising in 2016, watching on from a car as the military parade marched through Dublin. On 8 May 2016, in a joint appearance with the grandsons of Éamonn Ceannt and Cathal Brugha, he unveiled a plaque commemorating the 1916 Rising at St. James's Hospital, the former site of the South Dublin Union.

Horses were a lifelong passion, inherited from his family. Cosgrave took part in hunts, was a regular racegoer and served as a steward at Leopardstown racecourse, making time for these pursuits even while Taoiseach; through his Minister for Finance, Richie Ryan, he sanctioned funding that allowed the Irish Equitation School to purchase Rockbarton, who went on to become a celebrated showjumping horse. His enthusiasm for hunting and racing proved politically useful, offering common ground with opponents, most notably with Brian Faulkner during the Sunningdale negotiations. In retirement he devoted more time to the sport, and in 1991 he was made an honorary member of the Turf Club in recognition of his long association with Irish racing.

He received an annual pension payment of €133,082. He lived in Knocklyon.

== Personal life ==
Cosgrave married Vera Osborne in April 1952; she came from a Kildare family noted for horse breeding and racing, and their shared interest in horses remained a feature of their married life, with the couple frequently attending race meetings together. Following the death of his mother in 1959, Cosgrave and Vera moved into the family home at Beechpark, which had been rebuilt after the attack during the Civil War, living there alongside W. T. Cosgrave during his final years. As Taoiseach, Cosgrave maintained the habit of returning home during the day for lunch with Vera, a routine seldom interrupted. The couple had three children: Mary, Liam T. Cosgrave and Ciarán. His wife, Vera Cosgrave, died on 15 September 2016, aged 90. His son, Liam T. Cosgrave, is a former politician.

== Death ==
Cosgrave died in Tallaght, Dublin on 4 October 2017, at the age of 97. He had been at Tallaght Hospital for several months prior to his death there. Leaving instruction that "there's to be no speeches and no nonsense", his family honoured his wish to forgo the state funeral to which he was entitled.

Taoiseach Leo Varadkar said, "Liam Cosgrave was someone who devoted his life to public service; a grateful country thanks and honours him for that and for always putting the nation first. Throughout his life, he worked to protect and defend the democratic institutions of our State and showed great courage and determination in doing so. He always believed in peaceful cooperation as the only way of achieving a genuine union between the people on this island, and in the 1970s he celebrated that this country had embarked, in his own words, 'on a new career of progress and development in the context of Europe'. I had the honour on a few occasions to meet and be in the presence of Liam Cosgrave, and I was always struck by his commanding presence and great humility, which in him were complementary characteristics."

His funeral mass was held on 7 October 2017 at the Church of the Annunciation in Rathfarnham, attended by Taoiseach Leo Varadkar, members of the government, and former Taoisigh Bertie Ahern, John Bruton, Brian Cowen and Enda Kenny, after which he was interred alongside his father at Inchicore's Goldenbridge Cemetery. Reflecting the centrality of faith throughout his life, he made provision in his will for masses to be said for his soul.

He was the longest-lived Taoiseach, dying at the age of 97 years, 174 days, on 4 October 2017, having surpassed Éamon de Valera's record in early March 2013.

== See also ==
- Families in the Oireachtas

Political offices
Preceded by Eamon Kissane	Government Chief Whip; 1948–1951	Succeeded by Donnchadh Ó Briain
New office	Parliamentary Secretary to the Minister for Industry and Commerce; 1948–1951	Office abolished
Preceded by Frank Aiken	Minister for External Affairs; 1954–1957	Succeeded by Frank Aiken
Preceded by Jack Lynch	Taoiseach; 1973–1977	Succeeded by Jack Lynch
Party political offices
Preceded by James Dillon	Leader of Fine Gael; 1965–1977	Succeeded by Garret FitzGerald
Preceded by James Dillon	Leader of the Opposition; 1965–1973	Succeeded by Jack Lynch
Honorary titles
Preceded by Paddy Smith	Father of the Dáil; 1977–1981	Succeeded by Oliver J. Flanagan

Dáil	Election	Deputy (Party)	Deputy (Party)	Deputy (Party)	Deputy (Party)	Deputy (Party)	Deputy (Party)	Deputy (Party)	Deputy (Party)
2nd	1921	Michael Derham (SF)	George Gavan Duffy (SF)	Séamus Dwyer (SF)	Desmond FitzGerald (SF)	Frank Lawless (SF)	Margaret Pearse (SF)	6 seats 1921–1923	
3rd	1922	Michael Derham (PT-SF)	George Gavan Duffy (PT-SF)	Thomas Johnson (Lab)	Desmond FitzGerald (PT-SF)	Darrell Figgis (Ind)	John Rooney (FP)	6 seats 1921–1923	
4th	1923	Michael Derham (CnaG)	Bryan Cooper (Ind)	Thomas Johnson (Lab)	Desmond FitzGerald (CnaG)	Darrell Figgis (Ind)	John Good (Ind)	Kathleen Lynn (Rep)	Kevin O'Higgins (CnaG)
4th	1924 by-election	Batt O'Connor (CnaG)	Bryan Cooper (Ind)	Thomas Johnson (Lab)	Desmond FitzGerald (CnaG)	Darrell Figgis (Ind)	John Good (Ind)	Kathleen Lynn (Rep)	Kevin O'Higgins (CnaG)
4th	1926 by-election	Batt O'Connor (CnaG)	Bryan Cooper (Ind)	Thomas Johnson (Lab)	Desmond FitzGerald (CnaG)	William Norton (Lab)	John Good (Ind)	Kathleen Lynn (Rep)	Kevin O'Higgins (CnaG)
5th	1927 (Jun)	Batt O'Connor (CnaG)	Bryan Cooper (Ind)	Thomas Johnson (Lab)	Desmond FitzGerald (CnaG)	Patrick Belton (FF)	John Good (Ind)	Seán MacEntee (FF)	Kevin O'Higgins (CnaG)
5th	1927 by-election	Batt O'Connor (CnaG)	Bryan Cooper (Ind)	Thomas Johnson (Lab)	Desmond FitzGerald (CnaG)	Patrick Belton (FF)	John Good (Ind)	Seán MacEntee (FF)	Gearóid O'Sullivan (CnaG)
6th	1927 (Sep)	Batt O'Connor (CnaG)	Bryan Cooper (CnaG)	Joseph Murphy (Ind)	Desmond FitzGerald (CnaG)	Seán Brady (FF)	John Good (Ind)	Seán MacEntee (FF)	Gearóid O'Sullivan (CnaG)
6th	1930 by-election	Batt O'Connor (CnaG)	Thomas Finlay (CnaG)	Joseph Murphy (Ind)	Desmond FitzGerald (CnaG)	Seán Brady (FF)	John Good (Ind)	Seán MacEntee (FF)	Gearóid O'Sullivan (CnaG)
7th	1932	Batt O'Connor (CnaG)	Thomas Finlay (CnaG)	Patrick Curran (Lab)	Henry Dockrell (CnaG)	Seán Brady (FF)	John Good (Ind)	Seán MacEntee (FF)	Gearóid O'Sullivan (CnaG)
8th	1933	Batt O'Connor (CnaG)	John A. Costello (CnaG)	Margaret Mary Pearse (FF)	Henry Dockrell (CnaG)	Seán Brady (FF)	John Good (Ind)	Seán MacEntee (FF)	Gearóid O'Sullivan (CnaG)
8th	1935 by-election	Cecil Lavery (FG)	John A. Costello (CnaG)	Margaret Mary Pearse (FF)	Henry Dockrell (CnaG)	Seán Brady (FF)	John Good (Ind)	Seán MacEntee (FF)	Gearóid O'Sullivan (CnaG)
9th	1937	Cecil Lavery (FG)	Henry Dockrell (FG)	Gerrard McGowan (Lab)	Patrick Fogarty (FF)	Seán Brady (FF)	5 seats 1937–1948		
10th	1938	Patrick Belton (FG)	Henry Dockrell (FG)	Thomas Mullen (FF)	Patrick Fogarty (FF)	Seán Brady (FF)	5 seats 1937–1948		
11th	1943	Liam Cosgrave (FG)	Henry Dockrell (FG)	James Tunney (Lab)	Patrick Fogarty (FF)	Seán Brady (FF)	5 seats 1937–1948		
12th	1944	Liam Cosgrave (FG)	Henry Dockrell (FG)	Patrick Burke (FF)	Patrick Fogarty (FF)	Seán Brady (FF)	5 seats 1937–1948		
12th	1947 by-election	Liam Cosgrave (FG)	Henry Dockrell (FG)	Patrick Burke (FF)	Seán MacBride (CnaP)	Seán Brady (FF)	5 seats 1937–1948		
13th	1948	Éamon Rooney (FG)	Seán Dunne (Lab)	Patrick Burke (FF)	3 seats 1948–1961				
14th	1951	Éamon Rooney (FG)	Seán Dunne (Lab)	Patrick Burke (FF)	3 seats 1948–1961				
15th	1954	Éamon Rooney (FG)	Seán Dunne (Lab)	Patrick Burke (FF)	3 seats 1948–1961				
16th	1957	Éamon Rooney (FG)	Kevin Boland (FF)	Patrick Burke (FF)	3 seats 1948–1961				
17th	1961	Éamon Rooney (FG)	Kevin Boland (FF)	Patrick Burke (FF)	Mark Clinton (FG)	Seán Dunne (Ind)	5 seats 1961–1969		
18th	1965	Des Foley (FF)	Kevin Boland (FF)	Patrick Burke (FF)	Mark Clinton (FG)	Seán Dunne (Lab)	5 seats 1961–1969		
19th	1969	Constituency abolished. See Dublin County North and Dublin County South							

Dáil	Election	Deputy (Party)	Deputy (Party)	Deputy (Party)	Deputy (Party)
13th	1948	Seán Brady (FF)	Joseph Brennan (CnaP)	Liam Cosgrave (FG)	3 seats until 1961
14th	1951	Seán Brady (FF)	Percy Dockrell (FG)	Liam Cosgrave (FG)	3 seats until 1961
15th	1954	Seán Brady (FF)	Percy Dockrell (FG)	Liam Cosgrave (FG)	3 seats until 1961
16th	1957	Seán Brady (FF)	Lionel Booth (FF)	Liam Cosgrave (FG)	3 seats until 1961
17th	1961	Seán Brady (FF)	Lionel Booth (FF)	Liam Cosgrave (FG)	Percy Dockrell (FG)
18th	1965	David Andrews (FF)	Lionel Booth (FF)	Liam Cosgrave (FG)	Percy Dockrell (FG)
19th	1969	David Andrews (FF)	Barry Desmond (Lab)	Liam Cosgrave (FG)	Percy Dockrell (FG)
20th	1973	David Andrews (FF)	Barry Desmond (Lab)	Liam Cosgrave (FG)	Percy Dockrell (FG)
21st	1977	Constituency abolished. See Dún Laoghaire			

Dáil	Election	Deputy (Party)	Deputy (Party)	Deputy (Party)	Deputy (Party)	Deputy (Party)
21st	1977	David Andrews (FF)	Liam Cosgrave (FG)	Barry Desmond (Lab)	Martin O'Donoghue (FF)	4 seats 1977–1981
22nd	1981	David Andrews (FF)	Liam T. Cosgrave (FG)	Barry Desmond (Lab)	Martin O'Donoghue (FF)	Seán Barrett (FG)
23rd	1982 (Feb)	David Andrews (FF)	Liam T. Cosgrave (FG)	Barry Desmond (Lab)	Martin O'Donoghue (FF)	Seán Barrett (FG)
24th	1982 (Nov)	David Andrews (FF)	Liam T. Cosgrave (FG)	Barry Desmond (Lab)	Monica Barnes (FG)	Seán Barrett (FG)
25th	1987	David Andrews (FF)	Geraldine Kennedy (PDs)	Barry Desmond (Lab)	Monica Barnes (FG)	Seán Barrett (FG)
26th	1989	David Andrews (FF)	Brian Hillery (FF)	Eamon Gilmore (WP)	Monica Barnes (FG)	Seán Barrett (FG)
27th	1992	David Andrews (FF)	Helen Keogh (PDs)	Eamon Gilmore (DL)	Niamh Bhreathnach (Lab)	Seán Barrett (FG)
28th	1997	David Andrews (FF)	Monica Barnes (FG)	Eamon Gilmore (Lab)	Mary Hanafin (FF)	Seán Barrett (FG)
29th	2002	Barry Andrews (FF)	Fiona O'Malley (PDs)	Eamon Gilmore (Lab)	Mary Hanafin (FF)	Ciarán Cuffe (GP)
30th	2007	Barry Andrews (FF)	Seán Barrett (Note: Served as Ceann Comhairle in the 31st Dáil from 2011 to 2016 and was returned automatically at the 2016 general election.) (FG)	Eamon Gilmore (Lab)	Mary Hanafin (FF)	Ciarán Cuffe (GP)
31st	2011	Mary Mitchell O'Connor (FG)	Seán Barrett (FG)	Eamon Gilmore (Lab)	Richard Boyd Barrett (PBP)	4 seats from 2011
32nd	2016	Mary Mitchell O'Connor (FG)	Seán Barrett (FG)	Maria Bailey (FG)	Richard Boyd Barrett (AAA–PBP)	4 seats from 2011
33rd	2020	Jennifer Carroll MacNeill (FG)	Ossian Smyth (GP)	Cormac Devlin (FF)	Richard Boyd Barrett (S–PBP)	4 seats from 2011
34th	2024	Jennifer Carroll MacNeill (FG)	Barry Ward (FG)	Cormac Devlin (FF)	Richard Boyd Barrett (PBP–S)	4 seats from 2011
