= W. T. Cosgrave =

Head of government of the Irish Free State from 1922 to 1932

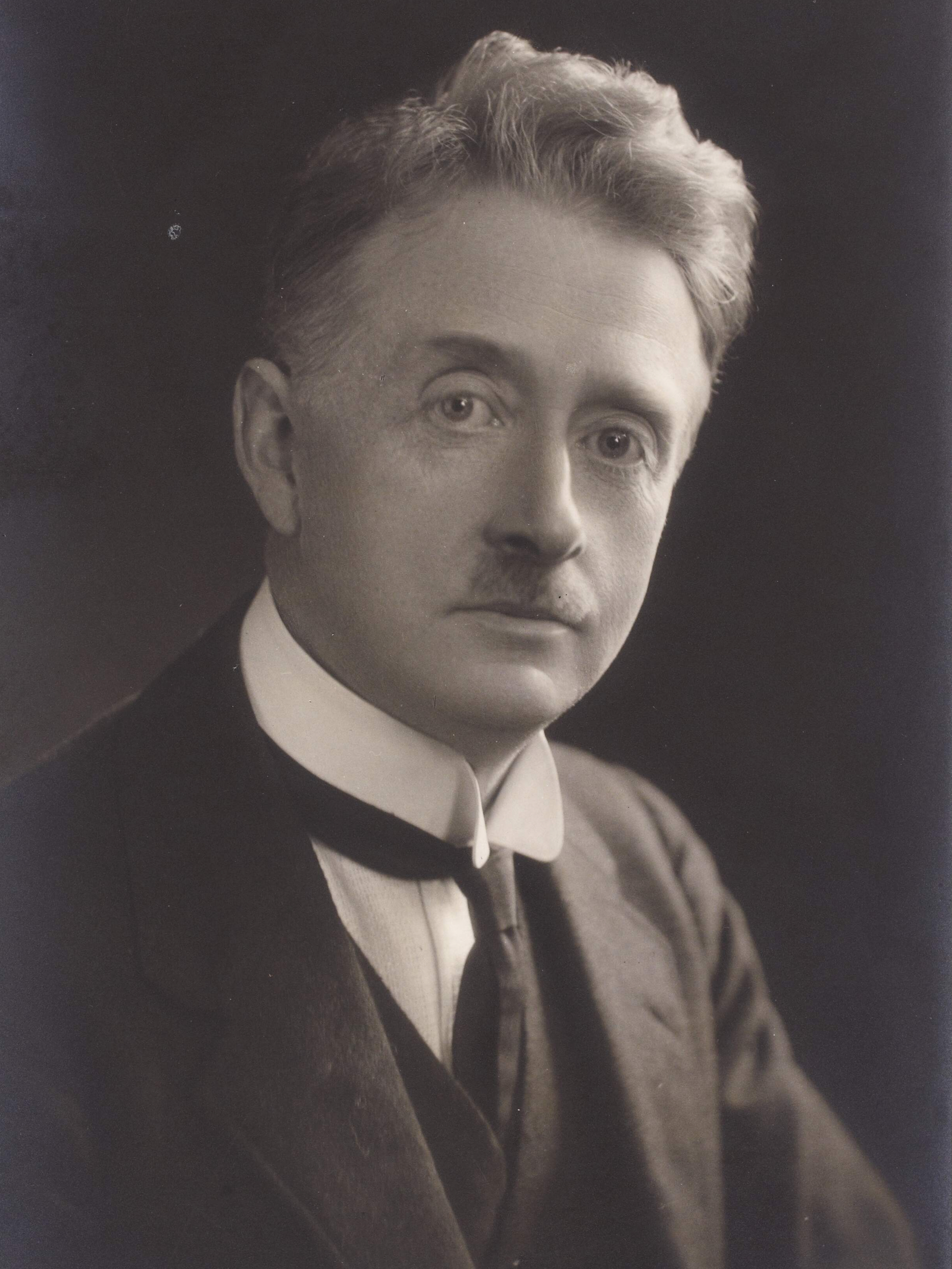
- Cosgrave, c.1920s

President of the Executive Council
- In office 6 December 1922 – 9 March 1932
- Governors-General: Tim Healy; James McNeill
- Vice President: Kevin O'Higgins; Ernest Blythe
- Preceded by: Himself (as Chairman of the Provisional Government and President of Dáil Éireann)
- Succeeded by: Éamon de Valera

Leader of the Opposition
- In office 9 March 1932 – 11 January 1944
- Taoiseach: Éamon de Valera (from 1937)
- Preceded by: Éamon de Valera
- Succeeded by: Thomas F. O'Higgins

Leader of Fine Gael
- In office 20 June 1934 – 30 May 1944
- Preceded by: Eoin O'Duffy
- Succeeded by: Richard Mulcahy

Leader of Cumann na nGaedheal
- In office 20 April 1923 – 9 September 1933
- Preceded by: New political party
- Succeeded by: Eoin O'Duffy (as Leader of Fine Gael)

Chairman of the Provisional Government
- In office 22 August 1922 – 6 December 1922
- Preceded by: Michael Collins
- Succeeded by: Himself (as President of the Executive Council)

President of Dáil Éireann
- In office 9 September 1922 – 6 December 1922
- Preceded by: Arthur Griffith
- Succeeded by: Himself (as President of the Executive Council)

Minister for Finance
- In office 17 July 1922 – 21 September 1923
- President: Michael Collins
- Preceded by: Michael Collins
- Succeeded by: Ernest Blythe

Minister for Local Government
- In office 2 April 1919 – 22 August 1922
- President: Michael Collins
- Preceded by: New office
- Succeeded by: Ernest Blythe

Teachta Dála
- In office September 1927 – May 1944
- Constituency: Cork Borough
- In office May 1921 – September 1927
- Constituency: Carlow–Kilkenny
- In office December 1918 – May 1921
- Constituency: Kilkenny North

Member of Parliament
- In office August 1917 – December 1918
- Constituency: Kilkenny City

Personal details
- Born: William Thomas Cosgrave; 5 June 1880 The Liberties, Dublin, Ireland
- Died: 16 November 1965 (aged 85) The Liberties, Dublin, Ireland
- Resting place: Goldenbridge Cemetery, Inchicore, Dublin, Ireland
- Party: Fine Gael
- Other political affiliations: Sinn Féin (1905–22); Cumann na nGaedheal (1923–33)
- Spouse: Louisa Flanagan (m. 1919; died 1959)
- Relations: Liam T. Cosgrave (grandson); Vera Cosgrave (daughter-in-law)
- Children: 2, including Liam
- Education: St. Joseph's School, Marino

Military service
- Allegiance: Irish Republic
- Years of service: 1913–1916
- Rank: Captain
- Battles/wars: Easter Rising
- Cosgrave's voice (2:30) Speech recorded 1931, for British Movietone

William Thomas Cosgrave (5 June 1880 – 16 November 1965) was an Irish politician who served as the President of the Executive Council of the Irish Free State from 1922 to 1932, Leader of the Opposition from 1932 to 1944, Leader of Fine Gael from 1934 to 1944, founder and leader of Cumann na nGaedheal, from 1923 to 1933, Chairman of the Provisional Government from August 1922 to December 1922, the President of Dáil Éireann from September 1922 to December 1922, the Minister for Finance from 1922 to 1923 and Minister for Local Government from 1919 to 1922. He served as a Teachta Dála (TD) from 1921 to 1944. He was also a Member of parliament (MP) for North Kilkenny from 1918 to 1922.

His son, Liam, served as Taoiseach from 1973 to 1977.

== Early and private life ==
William Thomas Cosgrave was born at 174 James's Street, Dublin in 1880, to Thomas Cosgrave, grocer, and Bridget (Nixon) Cosgrave. He was educated at the Christian Brothers School at Malahide Road, Marino, before entering his father's publican business. Cosgrave first became politically active when he attended the first Sinn Féin convention in 1905.

He was a Sinn Féin councillor on Dublin Corporation from 1909 until 1922 and joined the Irish Volunteers in 1913, although he never joined the Irish Republican Brotherhood because he didn't believe in secret societies.

He played an active role in the Easter Rising of 1916, serving under Éamonn Ceannt as a Captain at the South Dublin Union. Following the rebellion, Cosgrave was sentenced to death, but that was later commuted to penal servitude for life and he was interned at Frongoch internment camp, Wales. While imprisoned, he won a seat for Sinn Féin in the Kilkenny City by-election of August 1917. After his victory, he made a speech on the courthouse balcony. In September 1917, he and Michael Collins addressed a crowd in Dunboyne, County Meath, urging people to join the Irish Volunteers.

Cosgrave again won an Irish seat at the 1918 general election, this time for Kilkenny North. Although he and many other Sinn Féin MPs were still in prison at the time, 27 free Sinn Féin MPs, in accordance with their party's manifesto, refused to go to Westminster and instead formed the First Dáil, in which Cosgrave took his seat after he was released from prison in 1919. On 24 June 1919, he married Louisa Flanagan (28 August 1882 – 1959) in Dublin, daughter of Alderman Michael Flanagan, a nationalist councillor on Dublin Corporation between 1884 and 1919. During his later years, Cosgrave was cared for by his son and daughter-in-law, Liam and Vera.

== Political career ==
=== Minister for local government ===
Although Cosgrave was one of the most politically experienced of Sinn Féin's TDs, Cosgrave was not within the leadership of the party. However, when Éamon de Valera formed the Second Ministry of Dáil Éireann on 2 April 1919, Cosgrave was named as Secretary of Local Government. His close friendship with de Valera and his long experience on Dublin Corporation, most recently as chairman of its finance committee, were among the reasons he was selected. His chief task as Minister was the job of organising the non-cooperation of the people with the British authorities and establishing an alternative system of government.

After the 1920 local elections, elected under the new system of single transferable vote, 28 of the 33 local councils pledged loyalty to the Ministry of Local Government established by the Dáil. These councils then cut their links to the British government.

=== Anglo-Irish Treaty ===
Cosgrave supported the Anglo-Irish Treaty, which had been signed on 6 December 1921. At the cabinet meeting in Dublin held to consider the Treaty immediately after it had been signed, Cosgrave surprised de Valera by agreeing with Collins and with Arthur Griffith, de Valera's predecessor as leader of Sinn Féin and the chairman of the delegation which included Collins that had negotiated the Treaty. It was narrowly supported by the cabinet in a vote of 4 to 3, and was supported by the Dáil in a vote of 64 to 57. However, de Valera voted against and resigned as president in January 1922 (which in August 1921 had been upgraded from a prime ministerial President of Dáil Éireann to a full head of state, called President of the Irish Republic). Griffith succeeded de Valera as president. Collins, following the Treaty, formed a Provisional Government; this included Cosgrave amongst its membership as Minister for Local Government. From July onward, he also became Minister for Finance.

=== Chairman of the Provisional Government ===
The months following the acceptance of the Treaty saw a gradual progression to civil war. The split in Sinn Féin gradually deepened, and about three-quarters of the IRA were hardened against accepting anything less than a full republic. Collins and de Valera tried desperately to find a middle course and formed a pact whereby Sinn Féin fought a general election in June with a common slate of candidates. Despite this pact, the electorate voted heavily in favour of pro-Treaty candidates. On the day of the election, the draft Constitution of the Irish Free State was published; it was rejected by the Anti-Treatyites, for it was not a republican document. Collins, forced to a decision, opted to maintain the Treaty position and the support of the British government, and moved to suppress the Republican opposition that had seized the Four Courts in Dublin. The Civil War began on 28 June 1922, and the IRA was decisively defeated in the field over the following two months, being largely pinned back to Munster. In August 1922, both Griffith and Collins died in quick succession; the former of natural causes, the latter a few days later when ambushed by Republicans at Béal na Bláth, County Cork. With de Valera now on the fringes as the nominal leader of the anti-Treaty forces in the Civil War, the new dominion (which was in the process of being created but which would not legally come into being until December 1922) had lost all its most senior figures.

Though it had the option of going for General Richard Mulcahy, Collins' successor as Commander-in-Chief of the National Army, the pro-Treaty leadership opted for Cosgrave, in part due to his democratic credentials as a long-time politician. Having previously held the Local Government and Finance portfolios, Cosgrave became Chairman of the Provisional Government on 30 August and President of Dáil Éirean on 9 September. He served in both offices simultaneously until 6 December 1922, when the Irish Free State came into being.

== President of the Executive Council (1922–1932) ==
On 6 December 1922, Cosgrave was elected by the Dáil as president of the executive council. He formed the First Executive Council of the Irish Free State. Cosgrave was a small, quiet man, and at 42 was the oldest member of the Cabinet. He had not sought the leadership of the new country, but once it was his he made good use of it. One of his chief priorities was to hold the new country together and to prove that the Irish could govern themselves.

=== Domestic policy ===
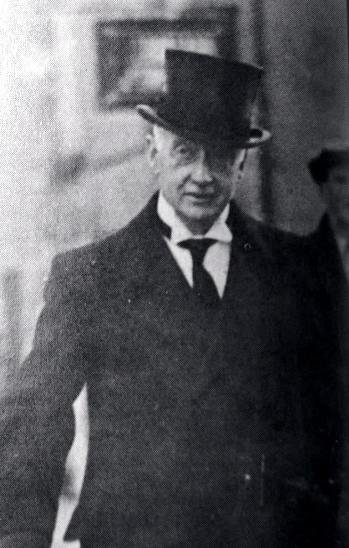
W. T. Cosgrave

As head of the Free State government during the Civil War, he was ruthless in what he saw as the defence of the state against his Republican former comrades. Although he disagreed with the use of the death penalty in principle, in October 1922, he enacted a Public Safety Bill, after difficult debates, and following the offer of an amnesty, that allowed for the execution of anyone who was captured bearing arms against the state, or aiding armed attacks on state forces. He told the Dáil on 27 September 1922: "Although I have always objected to the death penalty, there is no other way that I know of in which ordered conditions can be restored in this country, or any security obtained for our troops, or to give our troops any confidence in us as a government". His view was that if harsh action were not taken, a guerrilla war could drag on indefinitely, making the achievement of law and order and establishing the Free State impossible.

His army ordered courts martial on the rebels, 77 of whom were executed by firing squads by May 1923, including Erskine Childers, Liam Mellowes and Rory O'Connor, far more than the 14 IRA volunteers the British executed in the War of Independence. The Republican side, for their part, attacked pro-Treaty politicians and their homes and families. Cosgrave's family home was burned down by anti-Treaty fighters, and one of his uncles was shot dead.

Cosgrave said "I am not going to hesitate if the country is to live, and if we have to exterminate ten thousand Republicans, the three million of our people is greater than this ten thousand".

In April 1923, the pro-Treaty Sinn Féin members organised a new political party called Cumann na nGaedheal with Cosgrave as leader. The following month the Civil War was brought to an end when the remaining anti-Treaty IRA guerrillas announced a ceasefire and dumped their arms.

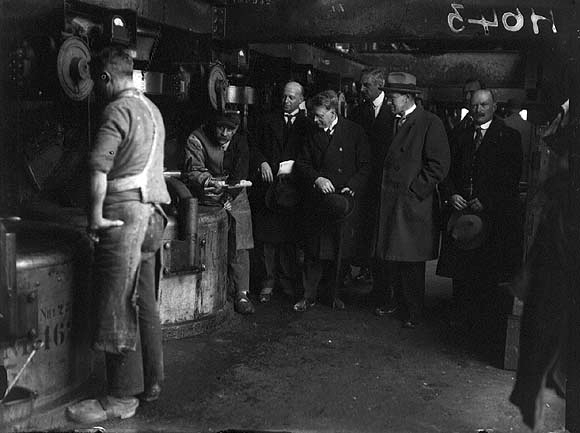
Cosgrave (holding furled umbrella) visiting the sugar beet processing factory at Strawhall, County Carlow, October 1926

One of his first acts in government was to pass a Bill for the Constitution of the Irish Free State, which some TDs felt did not need to be in writing. This was done by October 1922, ahead of the establishment of the Irish Free State in December.

In the first few years in office, Cosgrave's government faced several problems. The government attempted to reduce the size of the National Army. During the Civil War, it had grown to over 55,000 men which, now that the war was over, was far too large and costly to maintain. Some army officers challenged the authority of the government to cut the size of the Army. The officers, mostly Pro-Treaty IRA men, were angry that the government was not doing enough to help create a republic and predicted massive unemployment.

When he and his position were challenged by the disgruntled Army officers of the Irish Republican Army Organisation, other politicians and soldiers took the important decisions.

In March 1924, more layoffs were expected, and army officers Major-General Liam Tobin and Colonel Charles Dalton sent an ultimatum to the government demanding an end to the demobilisation. Minister for Justice Kevin O'Higgins, who was also acting president for Cosgrave while the latter was in hospital, moved to resolve the so-called "Army Mutiny". Richard Mulcahy, the Minister for Defence, resigned from the Executive Council. O'Higgins was victorious in a very public power struggle within Cumann na nGaedheal. The crisis within the army was solved but the government was divided.

In 1924, the British and Irish governments agreed to attend a Boundary Commission to redraw the border which partitioned Ireland between the Irish Free State and Northern Ireland. The Free State's representative was Minister for Education Eoin MacNeill, a respected scholar. The Free State expected to gain much territory in heavily Catholic and republican parts of Counties Londonderry, Fermanagh, Tyrone, and Armagh, for the British government had indicated during the Treaty negotiations that the wishes of the nationalist inhabitants along the border would be taken into account. However, after months of secret negotiations, a newspaper reported that there would be little change to the border, and the Free State would lose territory in County Donegal. MacNeill resigned from the Commission and, shortly afterwards, from the government for not reporting to Cosgrave on the details of the commission. Cosgrave immediately went to London for a meeting with the British Prime Minister and the Prime Minister of Northern Ireland, where they agreed to let the border remain as it was, and in return, the Free State did not have to pay its pro-rata share of the Imperial debt. In the Dáil debate on 7 December, Cosgrave stated: "I had only one figure in my mind and that was a huge nought. That was the figure I strove to get, and I got it."

Cosgrave turned down a plea for asylum in Ireland for Leon Trotsky while in exile. The request was made by the trade union leader William O'Brien in 1930. Cosgrave recorded that he:

Told [O'Brien] "I could see no reason why Trotsky should be considered by us. Russian bonds had been practically confiscated. He said there was to be consideration of them. I said it was not by Trotsky, whose policy was the reverse. I asked his nationality. Reply Jew. They were against religion (he said that was modified). I said not by Trotsky. He said he had hoped there would be an asylum here as in England for all. I agreed that under normal conditions, which we had not here, that would be alright. But we had no touch with this man or his Government, nor did they interest themselves in us in his 'day'.

In June 1927, a general election was held in which de Valera's new party, Fianna Fáil, won many seats on an abstentionist platform. In July the Minister for Justice, Kevin O'Higgins, was assassinated on his way home from Sunday Mass by the IRA. The government passed the Electoral Amendment Bill (1927) to force Fianna Fáil to take their seats in the Dáil. This proved successful with de Valera and his party entering the Dáil in August of that year. Previously, without de Valera, Cosgrave faced very little opposition, giving him considerable freedom of action. However, de Valera's arrival significantly altered the situation.

=== Foreign policy ===
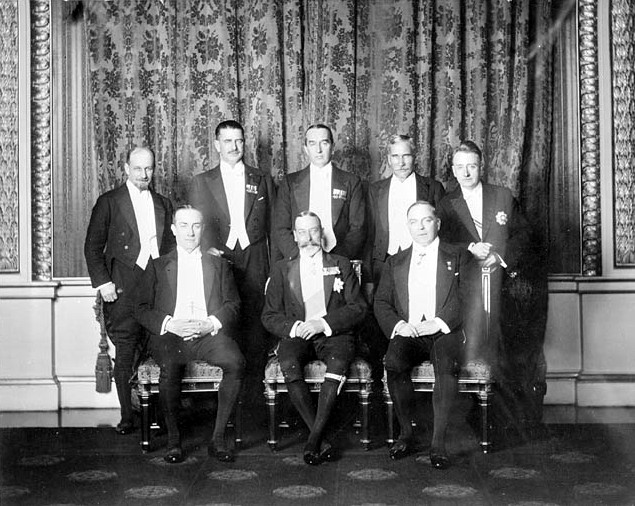
Cosgrave (standing, far-right, wearing the star and sash of the Order of Pope Pius IX) representing the Irish Free State at the 1926 Imperial Conference in London, along with King George V and the Prime Ministers of the United Kingdom, Canada, Newfoundland, Australia, New Zealand and South Africa

Although Cosgrave and his government accepted dominion status for the Irish Free State, they did not trust the British to respect this new independence. The government embarked on fairly radical foreign initiatives. In 1923 the Irish Free State became a member of the League of Nations. The new state also became the first British Commonwealth country to have a separate or non-British representative in Washington, D.C., and exchanged diplomats with many other European nations. In January 1926, Cosgrave was honoured by Pope Pius XI by making him the first Irishman to receive the rank of Knight Grand Cross of the Order of Pope Pius IX.

The Anglo-Irish Treaty itself also gave the Irish much more independence than many other dominions. The Oath of Allegiance in the Irish Free State was much less monarchist than its equivalent in Canada or Australia. The king's representative in Ireland was Irish, unlike the other dominions, and although the head of state was the king, power was derived from the Irish people and not him. There were also questions raised about the word "treaty". The British claimed it was an internal affair while the Irish saw it as an international agreement between two independent states, a point which was accepted by the League of Nations when that body registered the Treaty as an international agreement in 1924.

Even with these advances, the Irish Free State legally remained subject to the United Kingdom until 1931, when the Statute of Westminster gave the Free State and the other dominions the right to the full independence of legislative and constitutional action. This step effectively granted the Free State internationally recognised independence. While the state was still partitioned, it arguably fulfilled Collins' vision of the Treaty giving the Irish people "the freedom to achieve freedom." Shortly after the Statute passed, Cosgrave sought and received the right to have an Irish minister advise the king on matters related to the Free State to the exclusion of British ministers. This allowed the President of the Executive Council to directly advise the King in his capacity as His Majesty's Irish Prime Minister.

=== Economic policy ===
During the ten years that Cosgrave and Cumann na nGaedheal were in power, they adopted a conservative economic policy. Taxation was kept as low as possible and the budget was balanced to avoid borrowing. The Irish currency remained linked to the British currency, resulting in the overvaluation of the Irish pound. Free trade was advocated as opposed to protection, but moderate tariffs were introduced on some items.

The new government decided to concentrate on developing agriculture while doing little to help the industrial sector. Agriculture responded well with stricter quality control being introduced and the passing of a Land Act to help farmers buy their farms. Also, the Irish Sugar Company and the Agricultural Credit Corporation were established to encourage growth. However, the economic depression that hit in the 1930s soon undid the good work of Cosgrave and his ministers. Industry was seen as secondary to agriculture and little was done to improve it. The loss of the industrialised north-east of Ireland had a bad effect on the country as a whole. However, the Electricity Supply Board, with the first national grid in Europe, was established to provide employment and electricity to the new state.

=== General election 1932 ===
A general election was not required by law until the end of 1932. However, Cosgrave called one for February of that year. There was growing unrest in the country and a fresh mandate was needed for an important Commonwealth meeting in the summer. Another reason for calling the election early was the Eucharistic Congress to be held in June, a major national and international event.

Cosgrave, like most of his cabinet a devout Catholic, had invested much time in the build-up to it and wished it to proceed without any tension from a pending general election. In the event, Éamon de Valera and Fianna Fáil were the ones to derive all the kudos from that event. Cumann na nGaedheal fought the election on its record of providing ten years of honest government and political and economic stability. Instead of developing new policies, the party played the "red card" by portraying the new party, Fianna Fáil, as communists. Fianna Fáil offered the electorate a fresh and popular manifesto of social reform. Unable to compete with this, Cosgrave and his party lost the election, and a minority Fianna Fáil government came to power.

== Cosgrave in opposition ==
Following the general election of that year, Cosgrave assumed the role of Leader of the Opposition, as Fianna Fáil began what turned out to be sixteen years of single-party government. In 1933, three groups, Cumann na nGaedheal, the National Centre Party and the National Guard came together to form a new party, called Fine Gael. Cosgrave was named the merged party's deputy leader, with Eoin O'Duffy as party leader. However, since O'Duffy didn't have a seat in the Dáil, Cosgrave became Fine Gael's parliamentary leader and thus remained Leader of the Opposition. He became party leader the following year when O'Duffy stepped down. Under his leadership, Fine Gael lost elections in 1937, 1938 and 1943. Cosgrave retired as leader of the party at the Fine Gael Ard Fheis in the Mansion House, Dublin, on 26 January 1944, and was succeeded by Richard Mulcahy.

== Legacy ==
An effective and good chairman rather than a colourful or charismatic leader, he led the new state during the more turbulent period of its history, when the legislation necessary for the foundation of a stable independent Irish polity needed to be pushed through. Cosgrave's governments in particular played a crucial role in the evolution of the British Empire into the British Commonwealth, with fundamental changes to the concept of the role of the Crown, the governor-generalship and the British Government within the Commonwealth.

In overseeing the establishment of the formal institutions of the state, his performance as its first political leader may have been undervalued. In an era when democratic governments formed in the aftermath of the First World War were moving away from democracy and towards dictatorships, the Free State, under Cosgrave, remained unambiguously democratic, a fact shown by his handing over of power to his one-time friend, then rival, Éamon de Valera, when de Valera's Fianna Fáil won the 1932 general election, in the process killing off talk within the Irish Army of staging a coup to keep Cosgrave in power and de Valera out of government.

Perhaps the best endorsement made of Cosgrave came from his old rival Éamon de Valera, with whom he was reconciled before his death. To his son, Vivion, weeks after taking power in 1932 and reading the files on the actions of Cosgrave's governments concerning its work in the Commonwealth, he said of Cosgrave and Cosgrave's ministers, "[W]hen we got in and saw the files … they did a magnificent job, Viv. They did a magnificent job."

== Death ==
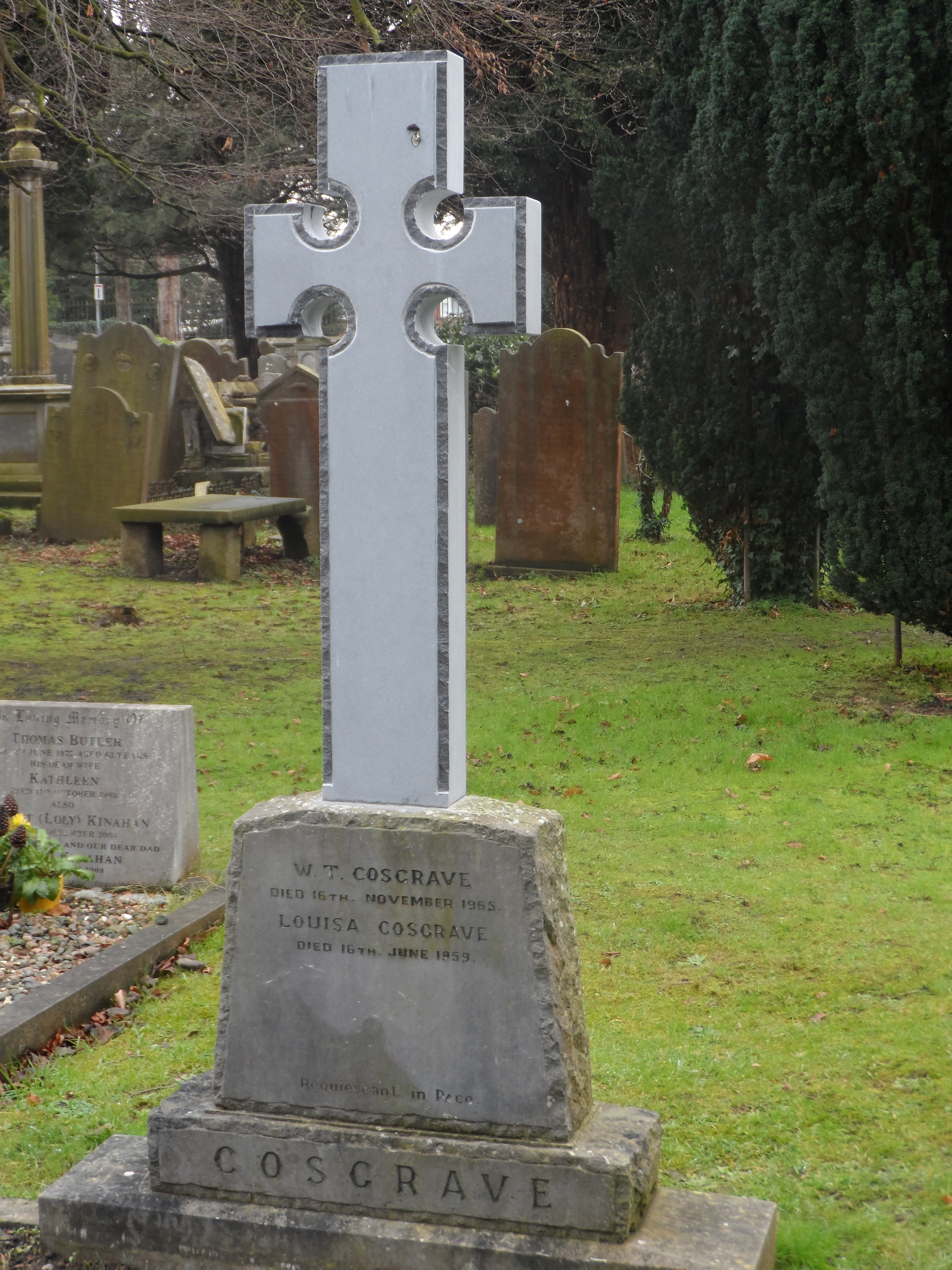
Cosgrave's gravestone in Goldenbridge Cemetery

Cosgrave died on 16 November 1965, aged 85. The Fianna Fáil government under Seán Lemass awarded him the honour of a state funeral, which was attended by the cabinet, the leaders of all the main Irish political parties, and Éamon de Valera, then President of Ireland. He is buried in Goldenbridge Cemetery in Inchicore in Dublin. Richard Mulcahy said, "It is in terms of the Nation and its needs and its potential that I praise God who gave us in our dangerous days the gentle but steel-like spirit of rectitude, courage and humble self-sacrifice, that was William T. Cosgrave".

Cosgrave's son, Liam, served as a TD from 1943 to 1981 and served as leader of Fine Gael from 1965 to 1977 and Taoiseach from 1973 to 1977. W. T.'s grandson, also called Liam, also served as a TD and as Senator and his granddaughter, Louise Cosgrave, served as on Dún Laoghaire–Rathdown County Council from 1999 to 2009.

In October 2014, his grave was vandalised, the top of a Celtic cross on the headstone being broken off. It was again vandalised in March 2016.

== Governments ==
The following governments were led by Cosgrave:

- 1st provisional government (22–30 August 1922)
- 2nd provisional government (August 1922 – December 1922)
- 1st executive council of the Irish Free State (December 1922 – September 1923)
- 2nd executive council of the Irish Free State (September 1923 – June 1927)
- 3rd executive council of the Irish Free State (June 1927 – October 1927)
- 4th executive council of the Irish Free State (October 1927 – April 1930)
- 5th executive council of the Irish Free State (April 1930 – March 1932)

== See also ==
- Families in the Oireachtas
- List of people on the postage stamps of Ireland

Parliament of the United Kingdom
Preceded by Pat O'Brien	Member of Parliament for Kilkenny City; 1917–1918	Constituency abolished
Preceded by Michael Meagher	Member of Parliament for Kilkenny North; 1918–1922	Constituency abolished
Oireachtas
New constituency	Teachta Dála for North Kilkenny; 1918–1921	Constituency abolished
Political offices
New office	Minister for Local Government; 1919–1922	Succeeded by Ernest Blythe
Preceded by Michael Collins	Minister for Finance; 1922–1923	Succeeded by Ernest Blythe
Preceded by Arthur Griffith	President of Dáil Éireann; 1922	Succeeded by Himself as President of the Executive Council
Preceded by Michael Collins	Chairman of the Provisional Government; 1922	Succeeded by Himself as President of the Executive Council
Preceded by Himself as President of Dáil Éireann	President of the Executive Council; 1922–1932	Succeeded by Éamon de Valera
Preceded by Himself as Chairman of the Provisional Government	President of the Executive Council; 1922–1932	Succeeded by Éamon de Valera
Party political offices
Preceded by Himself as Leader of Pro-Treaty Sinn Féin	Leader of Cumann na nGaedheal; 1923–1933	Succeeded by Leader of Fine Gael
Preceded by Himself as Parliamentary Leader of Cumann na nGaedheal	Parliamentary Leader of Fine Gael; 1933–1944	Succeeded by Richard Mulcahy
Preceded by Eoin O'Duffy	Leader of Fine Gael; 1934–1944	Succeeded by Richard Mulcahy

Dáil	Election	Deputy (Party)	Deputy (Party)	Deputy (Party)	Deputy (Party)	Deputy (Party)
2nd	1921	Edward Aylward (SF)	W. T. Cosgrave (SF)	James Lennon (SF)	Gearóid O'Sullivan (SF)	4 seats 1921–1923
3rd	1922	Patrick Gaffney (Lab)	W. T. Cosgrave (PT-SF)	Denis Gorey (FP)	Gearóid O'Sullivan (PT-SF)	4 seats 1921–1923
4th	1923	Edward Doyle (Lab)	W. T. Cosgrave (CnaG)	Denis Gorey (FP)	Michael Shelly (Rep)	Seán Gibbons (CnaG)
4th	1925 by-election	Edward Doyle (Lab)	W. T. Cosgrave (CnaG)	Denis Gorey (FP)	Michael Shelly (Rep)	Thomas Bolger (CnaG)
5th	1927 (Jun)	Edward Doyle (Lab)	W. T. Cosgrave (CnaG)	Denis Gorey (CnaG)	Thomas Derrig (FF)	Richard Holohan (FP)
6th	1927 (Sep)	Edward Doyle (Lab)	W. T. Cosgrave (CnaG)	Peter de Loughry (CnaG)	Thomas Derrig (FF)	Richard Holohan (FP)
6th	1927 by-election	Edward Doyle (Lab)	Denis Gorey (CnaG)	Peter de Loughry (CnaG)	Thomas Derrig (FF)	Richard Holohan (FP)
7th	1932	Francis Humphreys (FF)	Denis Gorey (CnaG)	Desmond FitzGerald (CnaG)	Thomas Derrig (FF)	Seán Gibbons (FF)
8th	1933	James Pattison (Lab)	Richard Holohan (NCP)	Desmond FitzGerald (CnaG)	Thomas Derrig (FF)	Seán Gibbons (FF)
9th	1937	Constituency abolished. See Kilkenny and Carlow–Kildare				

Dáil	Election	Deputy (Party)	Deputy (Party)	Deputy (Party)	Deputy (Party)	Deputy (Party)
13th	1948	James Pattison (NLP)	Thomas Walsh (FF)	Thomas Derrig (FF)	Joseph Hughes (FG)	Patrick Crotty (FG)
14th	1951	Francis Humphreys (FF)	Thomas Walsh (FF)	Thomas Derrig (FF)	Joseph Hughes (FG)	Patrick Crotty (FG)
15th	1954	James Pattison (Lab)	Thomas Walsh (FF)	Thomas Derrig (FF)	Joseph Hughes (FG)	Patrick Crotty (FG)
15th	1956 by-election	James Pattison (Lab)	Martin Medlar (FF)	Thomas Derrig (FF)	Joseph Hughes (FG)	Patrick Crotty (FG)
16th	1957	Francis Humphreys (FF)	Martin Medlar (FF)	Jim Gibbons (FF)	Joseph Hughes (FG)	Patrick Crotty (FG)
16th	1960 by-election	Patrick Teehan (FF)	Martin Medlar (FF)	Jim Gibbons (FF)	Joseph Hughes (FG)	Patrick Crotty (FG)
17th	1961	Séamus Pattison (Lab)	Martin Medlar (FF)	Jim Gibbons (FF)	Desmond Governey (FG)	Patrick Crotty (FG)
18th	1965	Séamus Pattison (Lab)	Tom Nolan (FF)	Jim Gibbons (FF)	Desmond Governey (FG)	Patrick Crotty (FG)
19th	1969	Séamus Pattison (Lab)	Tom Nolan (FF)	Jim Gibbons (FF)	Desmond Governey (FG)	Kieran Crotty (FG)
20th	1973	Séamus Pattison (Lab)	Tom Nolan (FF)	Jim Gibbons (FF)	Desmond Governey (FG)	Kieran Crotty (FG)
21st	1977	Séamus Pattison (Lab)	Tom Nolan (FF)	Jim Gibbons (FF)	Liam Aylward (FF)	Kieran Crotty (FG)
22nd	1981	Séamus Pattison (Lab)	Tom Nolan (FF)	Desmond Governey (FG)	Liam Aylward (FF)	Kieran Crotty (FG)
23rd	1982 (Feb)	Séamus Pattison (Lab)	Jim Gibbons (FF)	Desmond Governey (FG)	Liam Aylward (FF)	Kieran Crotty (FG)
24th	1982 (Nov)	Séamus Pattison (Lab)	M. J. Nolan (FF)	Dick Dowling (FG)	Liam Aylward (FF)	Kieran Crotty (FG)
25th	1987	Séamus Pattison (Lab)	M. J. Nolan (FF)	Martin Gibbons (PDs)	Liam Aylward (FF)	Kieran Crotty (FG)
26th	1989	Séamus Pattison (Lab)	M. J. Nolan (FF)	Phil Hogan (FG)	Liam Aylward (FF)	John Browne (FG)
27th	1992	Séamus Pattison (Lab)	M. J. Nolan (FF)	Phil Hogan (FG)	Liam Aylward (FF)	John Browne (FG)
28th	1997	Séamus Pattison (Lab)	John McGuinness (FF)	Phil Hogan (FG)	Liam Aylward (FF)	John Browne (FG)
29th	2002	Séamus Pattison (Lab)	John McGuinness (FF)	Phil Hogan (FG)	Liam Aylward (FF)	M. J. Nolan (FF)
30th	2007	Mary White (GP)	John McGuinness (FF)	Phil Hogan (FG)	Bobby Aylward (FF)	M. J. Nolan (FF)
31st	2011	Ann Phelan (Lab)	John McGuinness (FF)	Phil Hogan (FG)	John Paul Phelan (FG)	Pat Deering (FG)
31st	2015 by-election	Ann Phelan (Lab)	John McGuinness (FF)	Bobby Aylward (FF)	John Paul Phelan (FG)	Pat Deering (FG)
32nd	2016	Kathleen Funchion (SF)	John McGuinness (FF)	Bobby Aylward (FF)	John Paul Phelan (FG)	Pat Deering (FG)
33rd	2020	Kathleen Funchion (SF)	John McGuinness (FF)	Jennifer Murnane O'Connor (FF)	John Paul Phelan (FG)	Malcolm Noonan (GP)
34th	2024	Natasha Newsome Drennan (SF)	John McGuinness (FF)	Jennifer Murnane O'Connor (FF)	Catherine Callaghan (FG)	Peter "Chap" Cleere (FF)

Dáil	Election	Deputy (Party)	Deputy (Party)	Deputy (Party)	Deputy (Party)	Deputy (Party)
2nd	1921	Liam de Róiste (SF)	Mary MacSwiney (SF)	Donal O'Callaghan (SF)	J. J. Walsh (SF)	4 seats 1921–1923
3rd	1922	Liam de Róiste (PT-SF)	Mary MacSwiney (AT-SF)	Robert Day (Lab)	J. J. Walsh (PT-SF)	4 seats 1921–1923
4th	1923	Richard Beamish (Ind.)	Mary MacSwiney (Rep)	Andrew O'Shaughnessy (Ind.)	J. J. Walsh (CnaG)	Alfred O'Rahilly (CnaG)
4th	1924 by-election	Richard Beamish (Ind.)	Mary MacSwiney (Rep)	Andrew O'Shaughnessy (Ind.)	J. J. Walsh (CnaG)	Michael Egan (CnaG)
5th	1927 (Jun)	John Horgan (NL)	Seán French (FF)	Richard Anthony (Lab)	J. J. Walsh (CnaG)	Barry Egan (CnaG)
6th	1927 (Sep)	W. T. Cosgrave (CnaG)	Seán French (FF)	Richard Anthony (Lab)	Hugo Flinn (FF)	Barry Egan (CnaG)
7th	1932	W. T. Cosgrave (CnaG)	Thomas Dowdall (FF)	Richard Anthony (Ind.)	Hugo Flinn (FF)	William Desmond (CnaG)
8th	1933	W. T. Cosgrave (CnaG)	Thomas Dowdall (FF)	Richard Anthony (Ind.)	Hugo Flinn (FF)	William Desmond (CnaG)
9th	1937	W. T. Cosgrave (FG)	Thomas Dowdall (FF)	Richard Anthony (Ind.)	Hugo Flinn (FF)	4 seats 1937–1948
10th	1938	W. T. Cosgrave (FG)	Thomas Dowdall (FF)	James Hickey (Lab)	Hugo Flinn (FF)	4 seats 1937–1948
11th	1943	W. T. Cosgrave (FG)	Frank Daly (FF)	Richard Anthony (Ind.)	Séamus Fitzgerald (FF)	4 seats 1937–1948
12th	1944	William Dwyer (Ind.)	Frank Daly (FF)	Richard Anthony (Ind.)	Walter Furlong (FF)	4 seats 1937–1948
12th	1946 by-election	Patrick McGrath (FF)	Frank Daly (FF)	Richard Anthony (Ind.)	Walter Furlong (FF)	4 seats 1937–1948
13th	1948	Patrick McGrath (FF)	Michael Sheehan (Ind.)	James Hickey (NLP)	Jack Lynch (FF)	Thomas F. O'Higgins (FG)
14th	1951	Patrick McGrath (FF)	Seán McCarthy (FF)	James Hickey (Lab)	Jack Lynch (FF)	Thomas F. O'Higgins (FG)
14th	1954 by-election	Patrick McGrath (FF)	Seán McCarthy (FF)	James Hickey (Lab)	Jack Lynch (FF)	Stephen Barrett (FG)
15th	1954	Patrick McGrath (FF)	Anthony Barry (FG)	Seán Casey (Lab)	Jack Lynch (FF)	Stephen Barrett (FG)
15th	1956 by-election	John Galvin (FF)	Anthony Barry (FG)	Seán Casey (Lab)	Jack Lynch (FF)	Stephen Barrett (FG)
16th	1957	John Galvin (FF)	Gus Healy (FF)	Seán Casey (Lab)	Jack Lynch (FF)	Stephen Barrett (FG)
17th	1961	John Galvin (FF)	Anthony Barry (FG)	Seán Casey (Lab)	Jack Lynch (FF)	Stephen Barrett (FG)
17th	1964 by-election	Sheila Galvin (FF)	Anthony Barry (FG)	Seán Casey (Lab)	Jack Lynch (FF)	Stephen Barrett (FG)
18th	1965	Gus Healy (FF)	Pearse Wyse (FF)	Seán Casey (Lab)	Jack Lynch (FF)	Stephen Barrett (FG)
18th	1967 by-election	Gus Healy (FF)	Pearse Wyse (FF)	Seán French (FF)	Jack Lynch (FF)	Stephen Barrett (FG)
19th	1969	Constituency abolished. See Cork City North-West and Cork City South-East				
