= List of Irish heads of government =

The head of government of the Republic of Ireland has gone by several different titles since the formation of the country in 1919. Under the short-lived Irish Republic of 1919–1922, the head of government was known first as the President of Dáil Éireann and later as the President of the Republic. Under the Irish Free State of 1922–1937, the head of government was the President of the Executive Council. There also briefly existed, immediately before the creation of the Irish Free State, an interim office of Chairman of the Provisional Government. For a brief period in 1921, the offices of President of the Republic and Chairman of the Provisional Government existed simultaneously. Since 1937, the Taoiseach heads a cabinet called the Government.

== Offices ==
Head	Deputy	Cabinet	State	Constitution	Date
President of Dáil Éireann / President of the Irish Republic (Note: The President of Dáil Éireann, also known as the Príomh Aire, was upgraded to a head of state-level President of the Irish Republic in August 1921.)	—N/a	Ministry	Irish Republic	Dáil Constitution	21 January 1919 – 6 December 1922 / 26 August 1921 – 6 December 1922
Chairman of the Provisional Government	—N/a	Provisional Government	Southern Ireland	Irish Free State (Agreement) Act 1922	3 May 1921 – 6 December 1922
President of the Executive Council	Vice-President	Executive Council	Irish Free State	Constitution of the Irish Free State	6 December 1922 – 29 December 1937
Taoiseach	Tánaiste	Government	Ireland	Constitution of Ireland	Since 29 December 1937

== List of officeholders ==
No.	Portrait	Name (Birth–Death) Constituency	Term of office			Political party	Election	Government	Dáil
No.	Portrait	Name (Birth–Death) Constituency	Took office	Left office	Time in office	Political party	Election	Government	Dáil
1		Cathal Brugha (1874–1922); MP for Waterford County	21 January 1919	1 April 1919	70 days	Sinn Féin	1918	1st Ministry	1
2		Éamon de Valera (1882–1975); MP for Clare East and Mayo East until 1921; TD for Clare from 1921	1 April 1919	9 January 1922	2 years, 283 days	Sinn Féin	—	2nd Ministry	1
2		Éamon de Valera (1882–1975); MP for Clare East and Mayo East until 1921; TD for Clare from 1921	1 April 1919	9 January 1922	2 years, 283 days	Sinn Féin	1921	3rd Ministry	2
3		Arthur Griffith (Note: From January to August 1922 there were two administrations operating in parallel, the Ministry of the self-declared independent Irish Republic and the Provisional Government accepted by the United Kingdom, and each cabinet had an overlapping membership. De Valera had filled both posts, but after his resignation there were two heads of government, Arthur Griffith, as President of the Republic, and Michael Collins as Chairman of the Provisional Government of Southern Ireland. This anomalous situation came about because the British Government would only recognise the parliament that it had established through the Government of Ireland Act, so Sinn Féin participated in the charade to move matters along. To add to the confusion, Collins was Griffith's Minister of Finance, while Griffith was Collins's Minister for Foreign Affairs. The dual leadership came to an end when W. T. Cosgrave assumed both offices on the deaths of Griffith, on 12 August 1922, and Collins, on 22 August, and merged the two parallel administrations.) (1872–1922); TD for Cavan	10 January 1922	12 August 1922	214 days	Sinn Féin (Pro-Treaty)	—	4th Ministry	2
4		Michael Collins (1890–1922); TD for Cork Mid, North, South, South East and West	16 January 1922	22 August 1922	218 days	Sinn Féin (Pro-Treaty)	—	1st Provisional Government	2
5		W. T. Cosgrave (1880–1965); TD for Carlow–Kilkenny until 1927; TD for Cork Borough from 1927	22 August 1922	9 March 1932	9 years, 200 days	Sinn Féin (Pro-Treaty)	—	1st Provisional Government	2
5		W. T. Cosgrave (1880–1965); TD for Carlow–Kilkenny until 1927; TD for Cork Borough from 1927	22 August 1922	9 March 1932	9 years, 200 days	Sinn Féin (Pro-Treaty)	1922	2nd Provisional Government	3
5		W. T. Cosgrave (1880–1965); TD for Carlow–Kilkenny until 1927; TD for Cork Borough from 1927	22 August 1922	9 March 1932	9 years, 200 days	Sinn Féin (Pro-Treaty)	—	1st Executive Council	3
5		W. T. Cosgrave (1880–1965); TD for Carlow–Kilkenny until 1927; TD for Cork Borough from 1927	22 August 1922	9 March 1932	9 years, 200 days	Cumann na nGaedheal	1923	2nd Executive Council	4
5		W. T. Cosgrave (1880–1965); TD for Carlow–Kilkenny until 1927; TD for Cork Borough from 1927	22 August 1922	9 March 1932	9 years, 200 days	Cumann na nGaedheal	1927 (Jun)	3rd Executive Council	5
5		W. T. Cosgrave (1880–1965); TD for Carlow–Kilkenny until 1927; TD for Cork Borough from 1927	22 August 1922	9 March 1932	9 years, 200 days	Cumann na nGaedheal	1927 (Sep)	4th Executive Council	6
5		W. T. Cosgrave (1880–1965); TD for Carlow–Kilkenny until 1927; TD for Cork Borough from 1927	22 August 1922	9 March 1932	9 years, 200 days	Cumann na nGaedheal	—	5th Executive Council	6
(2)		Éamon de Valera (1882–1975); TD for Clare	9 March 1932	18 February 1948	15 years, 346 days	Fianna Fáil (Note: Successor of the Sinn Féin Anti-Treaty faction.)	1932	6th Executive Council	7
(2)		Éamon de Valera (1882–1975); TD for Clare	9 March 1932	18 February 1948	15 years, 346 days	Fianna Fáil	1933	7th Executive Council	8
(2)		Éamon de Valera (1882–1975); TD for Clare	9 March 1932	18 February 1948	15 years, 346 days	Fianna Fáil	1937	8th Executive Council	9
(2)		Éamon de Valera (1882–1975); TD for Clare	9 March 1932	18 February 1948	15 years, 346 days	Fianna Fáil	—	1st Government	9
(2)		Éamon de Valera (1882–1975); TD for Clare	9 March 1932	18 February 1948	15 years, 346 days	Fianna Fáil	1938	2nd Government	10
(2)		Éamon de Valera (1882–1975); TD for Clare	9 March 1932	18 February 1948	15 years, 346 days	Fianna Fáil	1943	3rd Government	11
(2)		Éamon de Valera (1882–1975); TD for Clare	9 March 1932	18 February 1948	15 years, 346 days	Fianna Fáil	1944	4th Government	12
6		John A. Costello (1891–1976); TD for Dublin South-East	18 February 1948	13 June 1951	3 years, 115 days	Fine Gael (Note: Successor of Cumann na nGaedheal and two more parties.)	1948	5th Government	13
(2)		Éamon de Valera (1882–1975); TD for Clare	13 June 1951	2 June 1954	2 years, 354 days	Fianna Fáil	1951	6th Government	14
(6)		John A. Costello (1891–1976); TD for Dublin South-East	2 June 1954	20 March 1957	2 years, 291 days	Fine Gael	1954	7th Government	15
(2)		Éamon de Valera (1882–1975); TD for Clare	20 March 1957	23 June 1959	2 years, 95 days	Fianna Fáil	1957	8th Government	16
7		Seán Lemass (1899–1971); TD for Dublin South-Central	23 June 1959	10 November 1966	7 years, 140 days	Fianna Fáil	—	9th Government	16
7		Seán Lemass (1899–1971); TD for Dublin South-Central	23 June 1959	10 November 1966	7 years, 140 days	Fianna Fáil	1961	10th Government	17
7		Seán Lemass (1899–1971); TD for Dublin South-Central	23 June 1959	10 November 1966	7 years, 140 days	Fianna Fáil	1965	11th Government	18
8		Jack Lynch (1917–1999); TD for Cork Borough until 1969; TD for Cork City North-West from 1969	10 November 1966	14 March 1973	6 years, 124 days	Fianna Fáil	—	12th Government	18
8		Jack Lynch (1917–1999); TD for Cork Borough until 1969; TD for Cork City North-West from 1969	10 November 1966	14 March 1973	6 years, 124 days	Fianna Fáil	1969	13th Government	19
9		Liam Cosgrave (1920–2017); TD for Dún Laoghaire and Rathdown	14 March 1973	5 July 1977	4 years, 113 days	Fine Gael	1973	14th Government	20
(8)		Jack Lynch (1917–1999); TD for Cork City	5 July 1977	11 December 1979	2 years, 159 days	Fianna Fáil	1977	15th Government	21
10		Charles Haughey (1925–2006); TD for Dublin Artane	11 December 1979	30 June 1981	1 year, 201 days	Fianna Fáil	—	16th Government	21
11		Garret FitzGerald (1926–2011); TD for Dublin South-East	30 June 1981	9 March 1982	252 days	Fine Gael	1981	17th Government	22
(10)		Charles Haughey (1925–2006); TD for Dublin North-Central	9 March 1982	14 December 1982	280 days	Fianna Fáil	1982 (Feb)	18th Government	23
(11)		Garret FitzGerald (1926–2011); TD for Dublin South-East	14 December 1982	10 March 1987	4 years, 86 days	Fine Gael	1982 (Nov)	19th Government	24
(10)		Charles Haughey (1925–2006); TD for Dublin North-Central	10 March 1987	11 February 1992	4 years, 338 days	Fianna Fáil	1987	20th Government	25
(10)		Charles Haughey (1925–2006); TD for Dublin North-Central	10 March 1987	11 February 1992	4 years, 338 days	Fianna Fáil	1989	21st Government	26
12		Albert Reynolds (1932–2014); TD for Longford–Roscommon	11 February 1992	15 December 1994	2 years, 307 days	Fianna Fáil	—	22nd Government	26
12		Albert Reynolds (1932–2014); TD for Longford–Roscommon	11 February 1992	15 December 1994	2 years, 307 days	Fianna Fáil	1992	23rd Government	27
13		John Bruton (1947–2024); TD for Meath	15 December 1994	26 June 1997	2 years, 193 days	Fine Gael	—	24th Government	27
14		Bertie Ahern (born 1951); TD for Dublin Central	26 June 1997	7 May 2008	10 years, 316 days	Fianna Fáil	1997	25th Government	28
14		Bertie Ahern (born 1951); TD for Dublin Central	26 June 1997	7 May 2008	10 years, 316 days	Fianna Fáil	2002	26th Government	29
14		Bertie Ahern (born 1951); TD for Dublin Central	26 June 1997	7 May 2008	10 years, 316 days	Fianna Fáil	2007	27th Government	30
15		Brian Cowen (born 1960); TD for Laois–Offaly	7 May 2008	9 March 2011	2 years, 306 days	Fianna Fáil	—	28th Government	30
16		Enda Kenny (born 1951); TD for Mayo	9 March 2011	14 June 2017	6 years, 97 days	Fine Gael	2011	29th Government	31
16		Enda Kenny (born 1951); TD for Mayo	9 March 2011	14 June 2017	6 years, 97 days	Fine Gael	2016	30th Government	32
17		Leo Varadkar (born 1979); TD for Dublin West	14 June 2017	27 June 2020	3 years, 13 days	Fine Gael	—	31st Government	32
18		Micheál Martin (born 1960); TD for Cork South-Central	27 June 2020	17 December 2022	2 years, 173 days	Fianna Fáil	2020	32nd Government	33
(17)		Leo Varadkar (born 1979); TD for Dublin West	17 December 2022	9 April 2024	1 year, 114 days	Fine Gael	—	33rd Government	33
19		Simon Harris (born 1986); TD for Wicklow	9 April 2024	23 January 2025	289 days	Fine Gael	—	34th Government	33
(18)		Micheál Martin (born 1960); TD for Cork South-Central	23 January 2025	Incumbent	1 year, 303 days	Fianna Fáil	2024	35th Government	34

== Timeline ==
Source: President of Ireland website

== See also ==
- List of heads of state of Ireland
  - Irish head of state from 1922 to 1949
- President of Ireland
- Irish cabinets since 1919
- History of the Republic of Ireland
- Politics of the Republic of Ireland
- Records of Irish heads of government since 1922
- List of heads of government of Northern Ireland
