= Dáil election results =

Irish parliamentary results for the lower house

This is a summary of the results of general elections to Dáil Éireann, the house of representatives of the Oireachtas, the Irish Parliament, from 1918 to the present. With the exception of 1918, they were held using the electoral system of proportional representation by means of the single transferable vote.

== General elections ==
Notes:

- To preserve space, the table is divided according to the participation of different parties.
- An empty cell (–) indicates that the party did not participate in the election.

Legend:

Sinn Féin majority government
Irish Unionist Alliance majority government
Fianna Fáil majority government
Fianna Fáil-led minority or coalition government
Cumann na nGaedheal/Fine Gael-led coalition government
Party providing confidence and supply
Non-government party abstaining on confidence vote

=== 1918–1921 ===
The first two elections were not held as elections to the Dáil. The 1918 election refers to the results in Ireland of the British general election, treated by Sinn Féin as the election for the First Dáil. The 1921 election refers to the separate elections to the House of Commons of Southern Ireland and the House of Commons of Northern Ireland, treated by Sinn Féin as elections to the Second Dáil.

House of Commons	Dáil	Election date	Sinn Féin	Irish Unionist	Irish Parliamentary Nationalist (NI)	Labour Unionist	Ind Unionist	Ind	Ministry of the Dáil		
United Kingdom (31st)	1st	14 December 1918	73 (46.9%)	22 (25.3%)	6 (21.7%)	3 (3%)	1 (0.9%)	0 (2.1%)	1st	Brugha	SF
United Kingdom (31st)	1st	14 December 1918	73 (46.9%)	22 (25.3%)	6 (21.7%)	3 (3%)	1 (0.9%)	0 (2.1%)	2nd	De Valera	SF
Southern Ireland	2nd	24 May 1921	124 (unopposed)	–	–	–	4 (unopposed)	–	3rd 4th	De Valera; Griffith	SF
Northern Ireland (1st)	2nd	24 May 1921	6 (20.5%)	40 (66.9%)	6 (11.8%)	–	0 (0.6%)	0 (0.2%)	3rd 4th	De Valera; Griffith	SF

=== 1922 ===
On 7 January 1922, in the Anglo-Irish Treaty Dáil vote, TDs constituting the Second Dáil divided 64–57 (4 not voting) in favour of the Treaty. Those voting were those who were elected for Sinn Féin, which were 125, as five were elected for constituencies in both Northern Ireland and Southern Ireland. The Treaty being passed, elections were called for a constituent assembly of the Irish Free State, which constituted the 3rd Dáil.

Dáil	Election date	Sinn Féin (Pro-Treaty)	Sinn Féin (Anti-Treaty)	Labour	Farmers	BPG	Ind	Provisional Government Executive Council (Dec 1922)		
3rd	16 June 1922	58 (38.5%)	36 (Note: Did not sit) (21.8%)	17 (21.3%)	7 (7.8%)	1 (2.3%)	9 (8.2%)	2nd	W. T. Cosgrave	SF (Pro-Treaty)
3rd	16 June 1922	58 (38.5%)	36 (21.8%)	17 (21.3%)	7 (7.8%)	1 (2.3%)	9 (8.2%)	1st	W. T. Cosgrave	SF (Pro-Treaty); CnaG

=== 1923–1933 ===
Dáil	Election date	FF	CnaG	Labour	Farmers	SF	BPG	NL	IWL	NCP	Ind	Executive Council			Days
4th	27 August 1923	–	63 (39%)	14 (10.6%)	15 (12.1%)	44 (Note: As Republican candidates.) (27.4%)	3 (0.9%)	–	–	–	14 (10%)	2nd	W. T. Cosgrave	CnaG	1382
5th	9 June 1927	44 (26.2%)	47 (27.4%) (Note: Includes the outgoing Ceann Comhairle returned without election.)	22 (12.6%)	11 (8.9%)	5 (3.6%)	–	8 (7.3%)	–	–	16 (14%)	3rd	W. T. Cosgrave	CnaG	98
6th	15 September 1927	57 (35.2%)	62 (38.7%)	13 (9.1%)	6 (6.4%)	–	–	2 (1.6%)	1 (1.1%)	–	12 (7.9%)	4th	W. T. Cosgrave	CnaG	1615
6th	15 September 1927	57 (35.2%)	62 (38.7%)	13 (9.1%)	6 (6.4%)	–	–	2 (1.6%)	1 (1.1%)	–	12 (7.9%)	5th	W. T. Cosgrave	CnaG	1615
7th	16 February 1932	72 (44.5%)	57 (35.2%)	7 (7.7%)	4 (2%)	–	–	–	–	–	13 (11%)	6th	De Valera	FF	343
8th	24 January 1933	77 (49.7%)	48 (30.5%)	8 (5.7%)	–	–	–	–	–	11 (9.2%)	9 (5.0%)	7th	De Valera	FF	1619

=== 1937–1948 ===
Dáil	Election date	FF	FG	Labour	Ntl Labour	CnaT	CnaP	Ind	Government			Days
9th	1 July 1937	69 (45.2%)	48 (34.8%)	13 (10.3%)	–	–	–	8 (9.7%)	8th	De Valera	FF	351
9th	1 July 1937	69 (45.2%)	48 (34.8%)	13 (10.3%)	–	–	–	8 (9.7%)	1st	De Valera	FF	351
10th	17 June 1938	77 (51.9%)	45 (33.3%)	9 (10%)	–	–	–	7 (4.7%)	2nd	De Valera	FF	1832
11th	23 June 1943	67 (41.8%)	32 (23.1%)	17 (15.7%)	–	10 (9.8%)	–	12 (9.6%)	3rd	De Valera	FF	342
12th	30 May 1944	76 (48.9%)	30 (20.5%)	8 (8.8%)	4 (2.7%)	9 (10.1%)	–	11 (9.1%)	4th	De Valera	FF	1345
13th	4 February 1948	68 (41.9%)	31 (19.8%)	14 (8.7%)	5 (2.6%)	7 (5.5%)	10 (13.3%)	12 (8.3%)	5th	Costello	Inter-Party (1st)	1211

=== 1951–1965 ===
Dáil	Election date	FF	FG	Labour	CnaT	CnaP	SF	NPD	Ind	Government			Days
14th	30 May 1951	69 (46.3%)	40 (25.8%)	16 (11.4%)	6 (2.9%)	2 (4.1%)	–	–	14 (9.5%)	6th	De Valera	FF	1084
15th	18 May 1954	65 (43.4%)	50 (32%)	19 (12.1%)	5 (3.1%)	3 (3.8%)	0 (0.1%)	–	5 (5.5%)	7th	Costello	Inter-Party (2nd)	1022
16th	5 March 1957	78 (48.3%)	40 (26.6%)	12 (9.1%)	3 (2.4%)	1 (1.7%)	4 (5.4%)	–	9 (6.6%)	8th	De Valera	FF	1674
16th	5 March 1957	78 (48.3%)	40 (26.6%)	12 (9.1%)	3 (2.4%)	1 (1.7%)	4 (5.4%)	–	9 (6.6%)	9th	Lemass	FF	1674
17th	4 October 1961	70 (43.8%)	47 (32%)	16 (11.6%)	2 (1.5%)	1 (1.1%)	0 (3.1%)	2 (1%)	6 (5.7%)	10th	Lemass	FF	1281
18th	7 April 1965	72 (47.7%)	47 (34.1%)	22 (15.4%)	–	1 (0.8%)	–	–	2 (2.1%)	11th	Lemass	FF	1533
18th	7 April 1965	72 (47.7%)	47 (34.1%)	22 (15.4%)	–	1 (0.8%)	–	–	2 (2.1%)	12th	Lynch	FF	1533

=== 1969–1982 ===
Dáil	Election date	FF	FG	Labour	SF-WP	(P)SF	AHB	SLP	Ind	Government			Days
19th	18 June 1969	75 (45.7%)	50 (34.1%)	18 (17%)	–	–	–	–	1 (3.2%)	13th	Lynch	FF	1351
20th	28 February 1973	69 (46.2%)	54 (35.1%)	19 (13.7%)	0 (Note: The anti-abstentionist faction of Sinn Féin, often described as Official Sinn Féin or Sinn Féin (Gardiner Place).) (1.1%)	–	–	–	2 (3.8%)	14th	Cosgrave	FG–Lab	1569
21st	16 June 1977	84 (50.6%)	43 (30.6%)	17 (11.6%)	0 (Note: As Sinn Féin The Workers Party.) (1.7%)	–	–	–	4 (5.6%)	15th	Lynch	FF	1456
21st	16 June 1977	84 (50.6%)	43 (30.6%)	17 (11.6%)	0 (1.7%)	–	–	–	4 (5.6%)	16th	Haughey	FF	1456
22nd	11 June 1981	78 (45.3%)	65 (36.5%)	15 (9.9%)	1 (1.7%)	–	2 (2.5%)	1 (0.4%)	4 (3.7%)	17th	FitzGerald	FG–Lab	252
23rd	18 February 1982	81 (47.3%)	63 (37.3%)	15 (9.1%)	3 (2.3%)	0 (1%)	–	–	4 (3.0%)	18th	Haughey	FF	279

=== 1982–1989 ===
Dáil	Election date	FF	FG	Labour	PD	WP	SF	DSP	GP	Ind	Government			Days
24th	24 November 1982	75 (45.2%)	70 (39.2%)	16 (9.4%)	–	2 (3.3%)	–	0 (0.4%)	0 (Note: As the Ecology Party of Ireland.) (0.2%)	3 (2.3%)	19th	FitzGerald	FG–Lab (Note: Left the government, forcing it to call early elections.)	1546
25th	17 February 1987	81 (44.1%)	51 (27.1%)	12 (6.4%)	14 (11.8%)	4 (3.8%)	0 (1.9%)	1 (0.4%)	0 (Note: As the Green Alliance.) (0.4%)	3 (4%)	20th	Haughey	FF	849
26th	15 June 1989	77 (44.1%)	55 (29.3%)	15 (9.5%)	6 (5.5%)	7 (5%)	0 (1.2%)	1 (0.6%)	1 (1.5%)	4 (3.3%)	21st	Haughey	FF–PD	1259
26th	15 June 1989	77 (44.1%)	55 (29.3%)	15 (9.5%)	6 (5.5%)	7 (5%)	0 (1.2%)	1 (0.6%)	1 (1.5%)	4 (3.3%)	22nd	Reynolds	FF–PD	1259

=== 1992–2011 ===
Dáil	Election date	FF	FG	Labour	PD	SF	WP	GP	DL	SP	PBP	Ind	Government			Days
27th	25 November 1992	68 (39.1%)	45 (24.5%)	33 (19.3%)	10 (4.7%)	0 (1.6%)	0 (0.7%)	1 (1.4%)	4 (2.8%)	–	–	5 (5.9%)	23rd	Reynolds	FF–Lab	1654
27th	25 November 1992	66	47	32	9	—	—	1	6	—	—	5	24th	Bruton	FG–Lab–DL	1654
28th	6 June 1997	77 (39.3%)	54 (27.9%)	17 (10.4%)	4 (4.7%)	1 (2.5%)	0 (0.4%)	2 (2.8%)	4 (2.5%)	1 (0.7%)	0 (Note: As the Socialist Workers Party, before the creation of People Before Profit, which includes the SWP.) (0.1%)	6 (8.6%)	25th	Ahern	FF–PD	1806
29th	17 May 2002	81 (41.5%)	31 (22.5%)	20 (10.8%)	8 (4.0%)	5 (6.5%)	0 (0.2%)	6 (3.8%)	–	1 (0.8%)	0 (0.2%)	14 (9.7%)	26th	Ahern	FF–PD	1833
30th	24 May 2007	78 (41.6%)	51 (27.3%)	20 (10.1%)	2 (2.7%)	4 (6.9%)	0 (0.1%)	6 (4.7%)	–	0 (0.6%)	0 (0.5%)	5 (5.4%)	27th	Ahern	FF–GP–PD	1328
30th	24 May 2007	78 (41.6%)	51 (27.3%)	20 (10.1%)	2 (2.7%)	4 (6.9%)	0 (0.1%)	6 (4.7%)	–	0 (0.6%)	0 (0.5%)	5 (5.4%)	28th	Cowen	FF–GP–PD	1328
31st	25 February 2011	20 (17.5%)	76 (36.1%)	37 (19.5%)	–	14 (9.9%)	0 (0.1%)	0 (1.8%)	–	2 (1.2%)	2 (1.0%)	15 (12.5%)	29th	Kenny	FG–Lab	1792

=== 2016–2020 ===
Dáil	Election date	FF	FG	SF	Labour	GP	AAA–PBP/ S–PBP	SD	I4C	Aon	Ind	Government			Days
32nd	26 February 2016	44 (24.3%)	50 (25.5%)	23 (13.8%)	7 (6.6%)	2 (2.7%)	6 (3.9%)	3 (3.0%)	4 (1.5%)	–	19 (11.7%)	30th	Kenny	FG–Ind (Note: In a confidence and supply arrangement with Fianna Fáil.)	1405
32nd	26 February 2016	44 (24.3%)	50 (25.5%)	23 (13.8%)	7 (6.6%)	2 (2.7%)	6 (3.9%)	3 (3.0%)	4 (1.5%)	–	19 (11.7%)	31st	Varadkar	FG–Ind	1405
33rd	8 February 2020	38 (22.2%)	35 (20.9%)	37 (24.5%)	6 (4.4%)	12 (7.1%)	5 (2.6%)	6 (2.9%)	1 (0.4%)	1 (1.9%)	19 (12.2%)	32nd	Martin	FF–FG–GP	1724
33rd	8 February 2020	38 (22.2%)	35 (20.9%)	37 (24.5%)	6 (4.4%)	12 (7.1%)	5 (2.6%)	6 (2.9%)	1 (0.4%)	1 (1.9%)	19 (12.2%)	33rd	Varadkar	FG–FF–GP	1724
33rd	8 February 2020	38 (22.2%)	35 (20.9%)	37 (24.5%)	6 (4.4%)	12 (7.1%)	5 (2.6%)	6 (2.9%)	1 (0.4%)	1 (1.9%)	19 (12.2%)	34th	Harris	FG–FF–GP	1724

=== 2024– ===
Dáil	Election date	FF	FG	SF	Labour	SD	II	PBP–S	Aon	GP	100%R	Ind	Government			Days
34th	30 November 2024	48 (21.9%)	38 (20.8%)	39 (19.0%)	11 (4.7%)	11 (4.8%)	4 (3.6%)	3 (2.8%)	2 (3.9%)	1 (3.0%)	1 (0.3%)	16 (13.2%)	35th	Martin	FF–FG–Ind	

== See also ==
- List of Dáil by-elections
- Elections in the Republic of Ireland
- Elections in Northern Ireland
