= Minister for Justice, Home Affairs and Migration =

Irish government cabinet minister

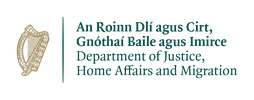

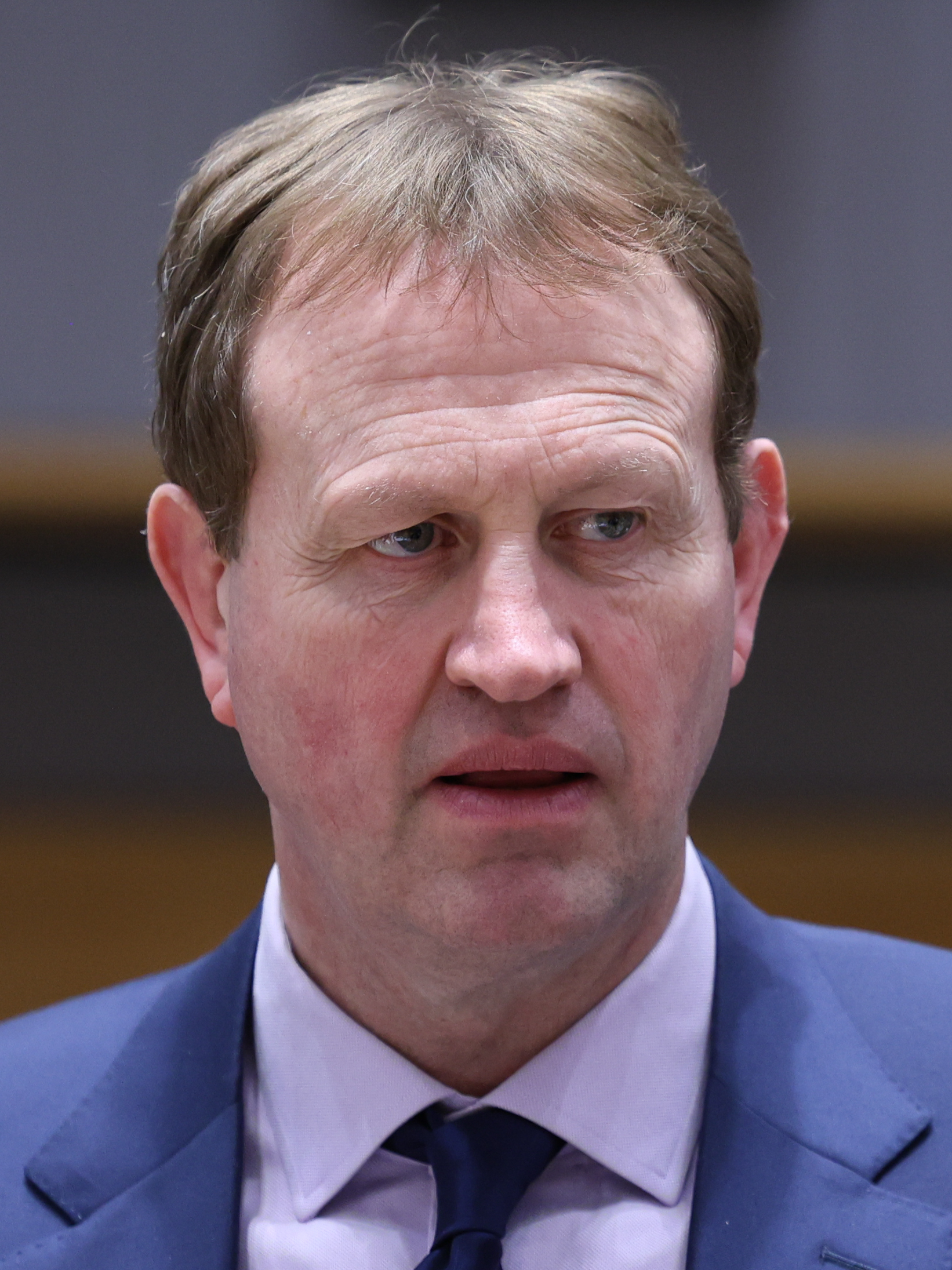
- Incumbent; Jim O'Callaghan since 23 January 2025
- Department of Justice, Home Affairs and Migration
- Type: Justice minister; Immigration minister; Home affairs minister
- Status: Cabinet minister
- Member of: Government of Ireland; Council of the European Union; Dáil Éireann
- Reports to: Taoiseach
- Seat: Dublin, Ireland
- Nominator: Taoiseach
- Appointer: President of Ireland (on the advice of the Taoiseach)
- Inaugural holder: Michael Collins as Minister for Home Affairs
- Formation: 22 January 1919
- Salary: €210,750 (2025) (including €115,953 TD salary)
- Website: Official website

The minister for justice, home affairs and migration (Irish: An tAire Dlí agus Cirt, Gnóthaí Baile agus Imirce) is a senior minister in the Government of Ireland and leads the Department of Justice, Home Affairs and Migration. The minister for justice, home affairs and migration has overall responsibility for law and order in Ireland.

The minister for justice, home affairs and migration since January 2025 is Jim O'Callaghan, TD.

He is assisted by two ministers of state:

- Niall Collins, TD – Minister of State for International law, law reform and youth justice
- Colm Brophy, TD – Minister of State for Migration

== History ==
From 1919 until 1924 the position was known as the minister for home affairs. It was renamed as the minister for justice under the Ministers and Secretaries Act 1924. The title has been altered a number of times since 1997, with its current title dating from 2025.

== Overview ==
The Minister's main areas of responsibility include:

- Implementing government policy and proposing new policy on crime, immigration, asylum, criminal and civil law reform and the criminal justice system in general.
- Implementation of government policy and proposing new policy in relation to national security (an area many countries assign to a separate 'Home' or 'Homeland Security' minister)
- Control and reform of the Garda Síochána
- Pardons (which are formally given by the president on the binding "advice" of the government, after proposal by the minister for justice - a rarely used power)
- Implementation of core elements of the Good Friday Agreement.

== List of office-holders ==
Denotes acting Minister

=== Minister for Home Affairs 1919–1924 ===
Name	Term of office		Party	Government(s) (Note: Before 1937: DM – Dáil Ministry; PG – Provisional Government; EC – Executive Council.)
Michael Collins	22 January 1919	1 April 1919	Sinn Féin	1st DM
Arthur Griffith	2 April 1919	22 August 1921	Sinn Féin	2nd DM
Austin Stack (Note: Austin Stack held the title of Secretary of State for Home Affairs.)	22 August 1921	9 January 1922	Sinn Féin	3rd DM
Eamonn Duggan	10 January 1922	9 September 1922	Sinn Féin (Pro-Treaty)	4th DM • 1st PG
Kevin O'Higgins	30 August 1922	2 June 1924	Cumann na nGaedheal	2nd PG • 5th DM • 1st EC • 2nd EC
=== Minister for Justice 1924–1997 ===
Name	Term of office		Party	Government(s)
Kevin O'Higgins	2 June 1924	10 July 1927	Cumann na nGaedheal	2nd EC • 3rd EC
W. T. Cosgrave (Note: Also President of the Executive Council of the Irish Free State.)	10 July 1927	12 October 1927	Cumann na nGaedheal	3rd EC
James FitzGerald-Kenney	12 October 1927	9 March 1932	Cumann na nGaedheal	4th EC • 5th EC
James Geoghegan	9 March 1932	8 February 1933	Fianna Fáil	6th EC
P. J. Ruttledge	8 February 1933	8 September 1939	Fianna Fáil	7th EC • 8th EC • 1st • 2nd
Gerald Boland (1st time)	8 September 1939	18 February 1948	Fianna Fáil	2nd • 3rd • 4th
Seán Mac Eoin	18 February 1948	7 March 1951	Fine Gael	5th
Daniel Morrissey	7 March 1951	13 June 1951	Fine Gael	5th
Gerald Boland (2nd time)	13 June 1951	2 June 1954	Fianna Fáil	6th
James Everett	2 June 1954	20 March 1957	Labour	7th
Oscar Traynor	20 March 1957	11 October 1961	Fianna Fáil	8th • 9th
Charles Haughey	11 October 1961	8 October 1964	Fianna Fáil	10th
Seán Lemass (acting)	8 October 1964	3 November 1964	Fianna Fáil	10th
Brian Lenihan Snr	3 November 1964	26 March 1968	Fianna Fáil	10th • 11th • 12th
Mícheál Ó Móráin	27 March 1968	5 May 1970	Fianna Fáil	12th • 13th
Desmond O'Malley	5 May 1970	14 March 1973	Fianna Fáil	13th
Patrick Cooney	14 March 1973	5 July 1977	Fine Gael	14th
Gerry Collins (1st time)	5 July 1977	30 June 1981	Fianna Fáil	15th • 16th
Jim Mitchell	30 June 1981	9 March 1982	Fine Gael	17th
Seán Doherty	9 March 1982	14 December 1982	Fianna Fáil	18th
Michael Noonan	14 December 1982	14 February 1986	Fine Gael	19th
Alan Dukes	14 February 1986	10 March 1987	Fine Gael	19th
Gerry Collins (2nd time)	10 March 1987	12 July 1989	Fianna Fáil	20th
Ray Burke (Note: Also Minister for Communications from 31 March 1987 to 6 February 1991.)	12 July 1989	11 February 1992	Fianna Fáil	21st
Pádraig Flynn	11 February 1992	4 January 1993	Fianna Fáil	22nd
Máire Geoghegan-Quinn	4 January 1993	15 December 1994	Fianna Fáil	23rd
Nora Owen	15 December 1994	26 June 1997	Fine Gael	24th
=== Minister for Justice, Equality and Law Reform 1997–2010 ===
Name	Term of office		Party	Government(s)
John O'Donoghue	26 June 1997	6 June 2002	Fianna Fáil	25th
Michael McDowell	6 June 2002	14 June 2007	Progressive Democrats	26th
Brian Lenihan Jnr	14 June 2007	7 May 2008	Fianna Fáil	27th
Dermot Ahern	7 May 2008	23 March 2010	Fianna Fáil	28th
=== Minister for Justice and Law Reform 2010–2011 ===
Name	Term of office		Party	Government(s)
Dermot Ahern	23 March 2010	19 January 2011	Fianna Fáil	28th
Brendan Smith (Note: Also Minister for Agriculture, Fisheries and Food.)	20 January 2011	9 March 2011	Fianna Fáil	28th
=== Minister for Justice and Equality 2011–2020 ===
Name	Term of office		Party	Government(s)
Alan Shatter (Note: Also Minister for Defence.)	9 March 2011	7 May 2014	Fine Gael	29th
Frances Fitzgerald	8 May 2014	14 June 2017	Fine Gael	29th • 30th
Charles Flanagan	14 June 2017	27 June 2020	Fine Gael	31st
=== Minister for Justice 2020–2025 ===
Name	Term of office		Party	Government(s)
Helen McEntee	27 June 2020	27 April 2021	Fine Gael	32nd
Heather Humphreys (Note: Also Minister for Social Protection and Minister for Rural and Community Development.)	27 April 2021	1 November 2021	Fine Gael	32nd
Helen McEntee (Note: On maternity leave from 27 April 2021 to 1 November 2021, and again from 25 November 2022 to 1 June 2023.)	1 November 2021	25 November 2022	Fine Gael	32nd
Heather Humphreys	25 November 2022	17 December 2022	Fine Gael	32nd
Simon Harris (Note: Also Minister for Further and Higher Education, Research, Innovation and Science.)	17 December 2022	1 June 2023	Fine Gael	33rd
Helen McEntee	1 June 2023	23 January 2025	Fine Gael	33rd • 34th
=== Minister for Justice, Home Affairs and Migration 2025–present ===
Name	Term of office		Party	Government(s)
Jim O'Callaghan	23 January 2025	Incumbent	Fianna Fáil	35th
