= Minister for Economic Affairs =

Former Irish government cabinet minister

The minister for economic affairs was a position in the Ministry of Dáil Éireann, the government of the Irish Republic, a self-declared state which was established in 1919 by Dáil Éireann, the parliamentary assembly made up of the majority of Irish MPs elected in the 1918 general election. The portfolio was created to promote economic growth and development throughout the country. It also existed in the First Provisional Government of Ireland, established after the ratification of the Anglo-Irish Treaty.

== Minister for Economic Affairs ==
Denotes acting minister

Name	Term of office		Party	Government(s)
Robert Barton	26 August 1921	9 January 1922	Sinn Féin	3rd DM
Kevin O'Higgins	10 January 1922	9 September 1922	Sinn Féin	4th DM • 1st PG
Ernest Blythe (acting)	17 July 1922	9 September 1922	Sinn Féin	1st PG
