= Minister for Agriculture, Food and the Marine =

Irish government cabinet minister

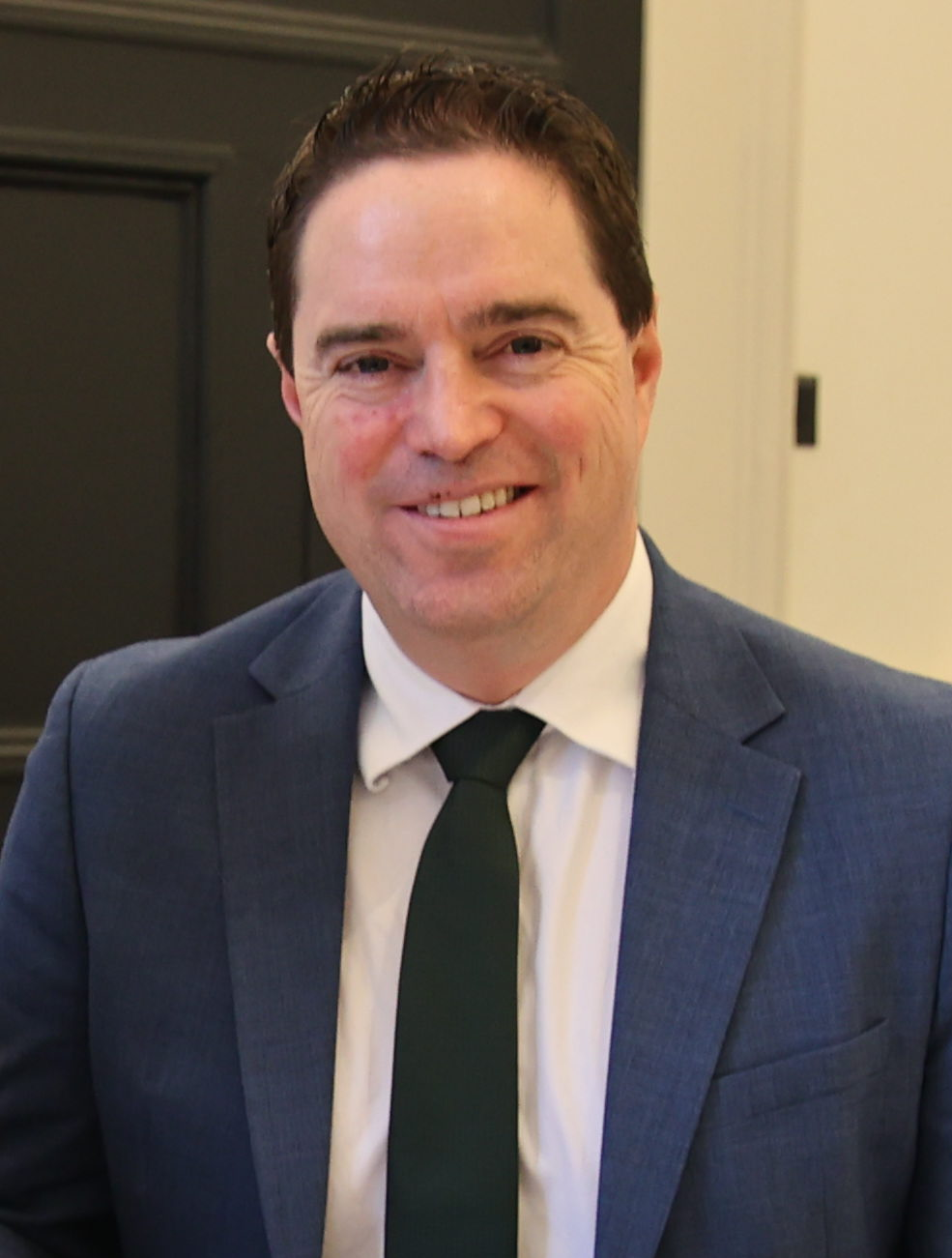
- Incumbent; Martin Heydon since 23 January 2025
- Department of Agriculture, Food and the Marine
- Type: Agriculture minister
- Status: Cabinet minister
- Member of: Government of Ireland; Council of the European Union; North/South Ministerial Council; Dáil Éireann
- Reports to: Taoiseach
- Seat: Dublin, Ireland
- Nominator: Taoiseach
- Appointer: President of Ireland (on the advice of the Taoiseach)
- Inaugural holder: Robert Barton as Director of Agriculture
- Formation: 2 April 1919
- Salary: €210,750 (2025) (including €115,953 TD salary)
- Website: Official website

The minister for agriculture, food and the marine (Irish: An tAire Talmhaíochta, Bia, Iascaigh agus Mara) is a senior minister in the Government of Ireland and leads the Department of Agriculture, Food and the Marine.

The current minister for agriculture, food and the marine is Martin Heydon. He is assisted by two ministers of state:

- Noel Grealish, TD – Minister of State for food promotion, new markets, research and development
- Timmy Dooley, TD – Minister of State for the marine

== Functions ==
The department's functions include:

- Policy advice and development on all areas of departmental responsibility
- Representation in international especially European Union and national negotiations;
- Development and implementation of national and EU schemes in support of agriculture, fisheries, forestry and rural development.
- Monitoring and controlling aspects of food safety.
- Control and audit of public expenditure under its control.
- Regulation of the agriculture, fisheries and food industries through national and EU law.
- Monitoring and controlling animal and plant health and animal welfare.
- Monitoring and direction of state bodies engaged in the following areas:
  - Research training and advice.
  - Market development and promotion.
  - Industry regulation and development.
  - Commercial activities.
- Direct provision of support services to agriculture, fisheries and forestry.

== List of office-holders ==
Denotes acting Minister

=== Director of Agriculture 1919–1921 ===
Name	Term of office		Party	Government(s) (Note: Before 1937: DM – Dáil Ministry; PG – Provisional Government; EC – Executive Council.)
Robert Barton	2 April 1919	26 August 1921	Sinn Féin	2nd DM
=== Secretary for Agriculture 1921–1922 ===
Name	Term of office		Party	Government(s)
Art O'Connor	26 August 1921	9 January 1922	Sinn Féin	3rd DM
=== Minister for Agriculture 1922–1924 ===
Name	Term of office		Party	Government(s)
Patrick Hogan	11 January 1922	2 June 1924	Cumann na nGaedheal	4th DM • 1st PG • 2nd PG • 5th DM • 1st EC • 2nd EC
=== Minister for Lands and Agriculture 1924–1928 ===
Name	Term of office		Party	Government(s)
Patrick Hogan	2 June 1924	1 September 1928	Cumann na nGaedheal	2nd EC • 3rd EC • 4th EC
=== Minister for Agriculture 1928–1965 ===
Name	Term of office		Party	Government(s)
Patrick Hogan	1 September 1928	9 March 1932	Cumann na nGaedheal	4th EC • 5th EC
James Ryan	9 March 1932	21 January 1947	Fianna Fáil	6th EC • 7th EC • 8th EC • 1st • 2nd • 3rd • 4th
Paddy Smith (1st time)	21 January 1947	18 February 1948	Fianna Fáil	4th
James Dillon (1st time)	18 February 1948	13 June 1951	Independent	5th
Thomas Walsh	13 June 1951	2 June 1954	Fianna Fáil	6th
James Dillon (2nd time)	2 June 1954	20 March 1957	Fine Gael	7th
Frank Aiken (1st time)	20 March 1957	16 May 1957	Fianna Fáil	8th
Seán Moylan	16 May 1957	16 November 1957	Fianna Fáil	8th
Frank Aiken (2nd time)	16 November 1957	27 November 1957	Fianna Fáil	8th
Paddy Smith (2nd time)	27 November 1957	8 October 1964	Fianna Fáil	8th • 9th • 10th
Charles Haughey	8 October 1964	21 April 1965	Fianna Fáil	10th
=== Minister for Agriculture and Fisheries 1965–1977 ===
Name	Term of office		Party	Government(s)
Charles Haughey	21 April 1965	10 November 1966	Fianna Fáil	11th
Neil Blaney	10 November 1966	7 May 1970	Fianna Fáil	12th • 13th
Jim Gibbons (1st time)	7 May 1970	14 March 1973	Fianna Fáil	13th
Mark Clinton	14 March 1973	9 February 1977	Fine Gael	14th
=== Minister for Agriculture 1977–1987 ===
Name	Term of office		Party	Government(s)
Mark Clinton	9 February 1977	5 July 1977	Fine Gael	14th
Jim Gibbons (2nd time)	5 July 1977	11 December 1979	Fianna Fáil	15th
Ray MacSharry	12 December 1979	30 June 1981	Fianna Fáil	16th
Alan Dukes	30 June 1981	9 March 1982	Fine Gael	17th
Brian Lenihan	9 March 1982	14 December 1982	Fianna Fáil	18th
Austin Deasy	14 December 1982	10 March 1987	Fine Gael	19th
=== Minister for Agriculture and Food 1987–1993 ===
Name	Term of office		Party	Government(s)
Michael O'Kennedy	10 March 1987	14 November 1991	Fianna Fáil	20th • 21st
Michael Woods	14 November 1991	11 February 1992	Fianna Fáil	21st
Joe Walsh (1st time)	11 February 1992	12 January 1993	Fianna Fáil	22nd
=== Minister for Agriculture, Food and Forestry 1993–1997 ===
Name	Term of office		Party	Government(s)
Joe Walsh (1st time)	12 January 1993	15 December 1994	Fianna Fáil	23rd
Ivan Yates	15 December 1994	26 June 1997	Fine Gael	24th
=== Minister for Agriculture and Food 1997–1999 ===
Name	Term of office		Party	Government(s)
Joe Walsh (2nd time)	26 June 1997	27 September 1999	Fianna Fáil	25th
=== Minister for Agriculture, Food and Rural Development 1999–2002 ===
Name	Term of office		Party	Government(s)
Joe Walsh (2nd time)	29 September 1999	6 June 2002	Fianna Fáil	25th
=== Minister for Agriculture and Food 2002–2007 ===
Name	Term of office		Party	Government(s)
Joe Walsh (2nd time)	6 June 2002	29 September 2004	Fianna Fáil	26th
Mary Coughlan	29 September 2004	14 June 2007	Fianna Fáil	26th
=== Minister for Agriculture, Fisheries and Food 2007–2011 ===
Name	Term of office		Party	Government(s)
Mary Coughlan	14 June 2007	7 May 2008	Fianna Fáil	27th
Brendan Smith	7 May 2008	9 March 2011	Fianna Fáil	28th
=== Minister for Agriculture, Food and the Marine 2011–2025 ===
Name	Term of office		Party	Government(s)
Simon Coveney	9 March 2011	6 May 2016	Fine Gael	29th
Michael Creed	6 May 2016	27 June 2020	Fine Gael	30th • 31st
Barry Cowen	27 June 2020	14 July 2020	Fianna Fáil	32nd
Micheál Martin (acting)	14 July 2020	15 July 2020	Fianna Fáil	32nd
Dara Calleary	15 July 2020	21 August 2020	Fianna Fáil	32nd
Micheál Martin (acting)	21 August 2020	2 September 2020	Fianna Fáil	32nd
Charlie McConalogue	2 September 2020	23 January 2025	Fianna Fáil	32nd • 33rd • 34th
Martin Heydon	23 January 2025	Incumbent	Fine Gael	35th
