= President of Dáil Éireann =

Leader of the revolutionary Irish Republic of 1919-1922

- Appointer: Dáil Éireann
- Formation: 22 January 1919
- First holder: Cathal Brugha
- Final holder: W. T. Cosgrave
- Abolished: 6 December 1922
- Succession: President of the Executive Council of the Irish Free State

President of the Irish Republic
- Appointer: Dáil Éireann
- Formation: 25 August 1921
- First holder: Éamon de Valera
- Final holder: Éamon de Valera
- Abolished: 9 January 1922

The president of Dáil Éireann (Irish: Príomh aire [ˌpʲɾʲiːw ˈaɾʲə]), later also president of the Irish Republic, was the leader of the revolutionary Irish Republic of 1919 to 1922. The office was created in the Dáil Constitution adopted by Dáil Éireann, the parliament of the Republic, at its first meeting in January 1919. This provided that the president was elected by the Dáil as head of a cabinet called the Ministry of Dáil Éireann. During this period, Ireland was deemed by Britain to be part of the United Kingdom of Great Britain and Ireland, but the Irish Republic had made a unilateral Declaration of Independence on 21 January 1919. On 6 December 1922, after the ratification of the Anglo-Irish Treaty, the Irish Free State was recognised by Britain as a sovereign state, and the position of the president of Dáil Éireann was replaced by that of president of the Executive Council of the Irish Free State but, as a Dominion of the British Empire, the British monarch was head of state until the dominion status was rescinded in 1949.

== Title ==
The Irish text of the Dáil Constitution referred to the leader of the state as the príomh aire. In English this was translated as both 'prime minister' and 'president of the ministry'. The term 'President of Dáil Éireann' was also used interchangeably with these terms, although this did not appear in the constitution. This was the title preferred by Éamon de Valera during his visit to the United States in 1920–1921. The president of Dáil Éireann was not its chairman, this was the role of a separate official: the Ceann Comhairle.

The Dáil Constitution did not provide for a head of state and the titles initially used suggested an official who was head of government only. In practice, de Valera, particularly when abroad, called himself "President de Valera", creating the impression that he was head of state. In August 1921, in the preparatory negotiations that would produce the Anglo-Irish Treaty, de Valera asked the Dáil to amend the constitution to upgrade his official status to that of head of state, in part to give him equality with George V in accrediting delegates to the negotiations. He also had the ministry restructured, with a number of offices downgraded from cabinet to sub-cabinet level.

He also maintained that, as the highest official in the Republic, the príomh aire was the de facto head of state and that an amendment would merely bring the language of the constitution into harmony with this reality. It was first suggested that the constitution be amended to explicitly use the term president of the Republic. However, because of opposition to this, a more ambiguously worded amendment was adopted referring to the office-holder as "the President who shall also be Prime Minister". After the adoption of this amendment, de Valera was elected as "president of the Republic" and continued to use the title until he resigned in January 1922. Both his two successors were both elected as "presidents of Dáil Éireann".

== Functions ==
The president of Dáil Éireann had authority to appoint the remaining members of the Ministry, subject to ratification by the Dáil, and ministers could be dismissed by the president at any time. The resignation of the president also resulted in the automatic dissolution of the whole Ministry. The president, and all other members of the cabinet, had to be members of the Dáil and could theoretically be removed from office, either collectively or individually, by a vote of the house.

In April 1919 a constitutional amendment was adopted providing for a form of vice presidency. The president was granted power to appoint a 'president-substitute' or 'deputy president' who would carry out his duties on a temporary basis if he was unable to discharge them.

== History ==
When the First Dáil met in 1919, Éamon de Valera was the president of Sinn Féin and thus the natural choice for leadership. However he had been imprisoned in England so, at the second meeting of the Dáil on 22 January, Cathal Brugha was elected as the first príomh aire on a temporary basis. De Valera escaped Lincoln Prison in February and so was elected to replace Brugha at the Dáil's third meeting on 1 April. As leader de Valera visited the United States from June 1919 to December 1920. His aim was to gain both popular and official recognition for the Republic, and to float a loan to finance Dáil Éireann and the War of Independence. By letter, de Valera requested that Arthur Griffith–then the Minister for Home Affairs– be appointed as Deputy President in his absence. De Valera resumed his position in the Dáil on 25 January 1921. By his return de Valera had won public but not official support for the Republic and had raised a loan of $6 million.

After the election of the Second Dáil in 1921, de Valera resigned on 26 August and was immediately re-elected, adopting the new style of President of the Republic. He then remained in office until January 1922 after the Dáil voted to ratify the Anglo-Irish Treaty. De Valera had opposed the Treaty, and resigned as president. He submitted his name for re-election but was rejected by the Dáil, which then elected Arthur Griffith on 10 January, who supported the treaty, under the previous style and title of President of Dáil Éireann.

On 16 January the British government, to implement the treaty, appointed a new Irish administration called the provisional government which over the course of the year from the date of the signing of the Treaty would succeed to functions of the Dublin Castle administration in preparation for the recognition of the Irish Free State. This administration operated in parallel with the Dáil administration, which the British government continued not to recognise. Therefore, throughout 1922, there were two parallel Irish administrations, which from January to August had different heads of government: Arthur Griffith as president of Dáil Éireann, and Michael Collins as chairman of the provisional government. Collins was also minister for finance in Griffith's cabinet. This anomalous situation continued until Griffith and Collins both died suddenly in August 1922; Collins was shot by anti-Treaty irregulars while Griffith died of natural causes. W. T. Cosgrave was appointed chairman of the provisional government on 25 August and was later elected as President of Dáil Éireann on 9 September.

On 6 December, the Irish Free State was established as a sovereign state recognised as independent of the United Kingdom. The institution of both the Irish Republic and the provisional government came to an end as the new Constitution of the Irish Free State came into force. The Irish Free State had the king as head of state, with the Governor-General of the Irish Free State as the king's representative, and the president of the executive council as head of government. On the day the Irish Free State came into operation, W.T. Cosgrave was nominated by the Dáil as the first president of the executive council and appointed by the governor-general.

== List of office-holders ==
No.	Portrait	Name	Title used	Term of office			Party	Dáil	Ref.
No.	Portrait	Name	Title used	Took office	Left office	Time in office	Party	Dáil	Ref.
1		Cathal Brugha	President of Dáil Éireann / Príomh Aire	22 January 1919	1 April 1919	69 days	Sinn Féin	First Dáil	
2		Éamon de Valera	President of Dáil Éireann / Príomh Aire	1 April 1919	26 August 1921	2 years, 147 days	Sinn Féin	First Dáil	
–		Éamon de Valera	President of the Republic / Uachtarán na Poblachta	26 August 1921	9 January 1922	136 days	Sinn Féin	Second Dáil	
3		Arthur Griffith	President of Dáil Éireann / Príomh Aire	10 January 1922	12 August 1922	214 days	Sinn Féin (pro-Treaty faction)	Second Dáil	
4		W. T. Cosgrave	President of Dáil Éireann / Príomh Aire	9 September 1922	6 December 1922	88 days	Sinn Féin (pro-Treaty faction)	3rd Dáil	

== See also ==
- List of Irish heads of government
