= Government of the 2nd Dáil =

Governments of Ireland 1921 to 1922

There were two governments of the 2nd Dáil, which were ministries of Dáil Éireann, the assembly of Dáil Éireann that was the legislature of the Irish Republic, a unilaterally declared state which lasted from 1919 to 1922. The Second Dáil was elected at the 1921 Irish elections on 24 May 1921. The 3rd ministry (26 August 1921 – 9 January 1922) was led by Éamon de Valera as president and lasted 136 days. De Valera resigned as president after the Dáil voted to accept the Anglo-Irish Treaty. The 4th ministry (10 January – 9 September 1922) was led by Arthur Griffith as president. Griffith died in office on 12 August 1922, but a new Dáil ministry was not formed until 9 September 1922. Griffith served 214 days as president, with a further 28 days between his death and the appointment of W. T. Cosgrave as his successor by the Dáil.

The provisional government of Ireland, established under the terms of the Treaty, overlapped with the later period of ministries of Dáil Éireann. The 1st provisional government was led by Michael Collins as Chairman of the Provisional Government from 16 January 1922 until his death on 22 August 1922. On 25 August 1922, W. T. Cosgrave was appointed as his successor, with the other members of the new provisional government appointed on 30 September. The 1st provisional government lasted 218 days from the appointment of Collins until his death, with three days elapsing until the appointment of Cosgrave as his successor.

== 3rd ministry ==
Government of the 2nd Dáil; 3rd ministry
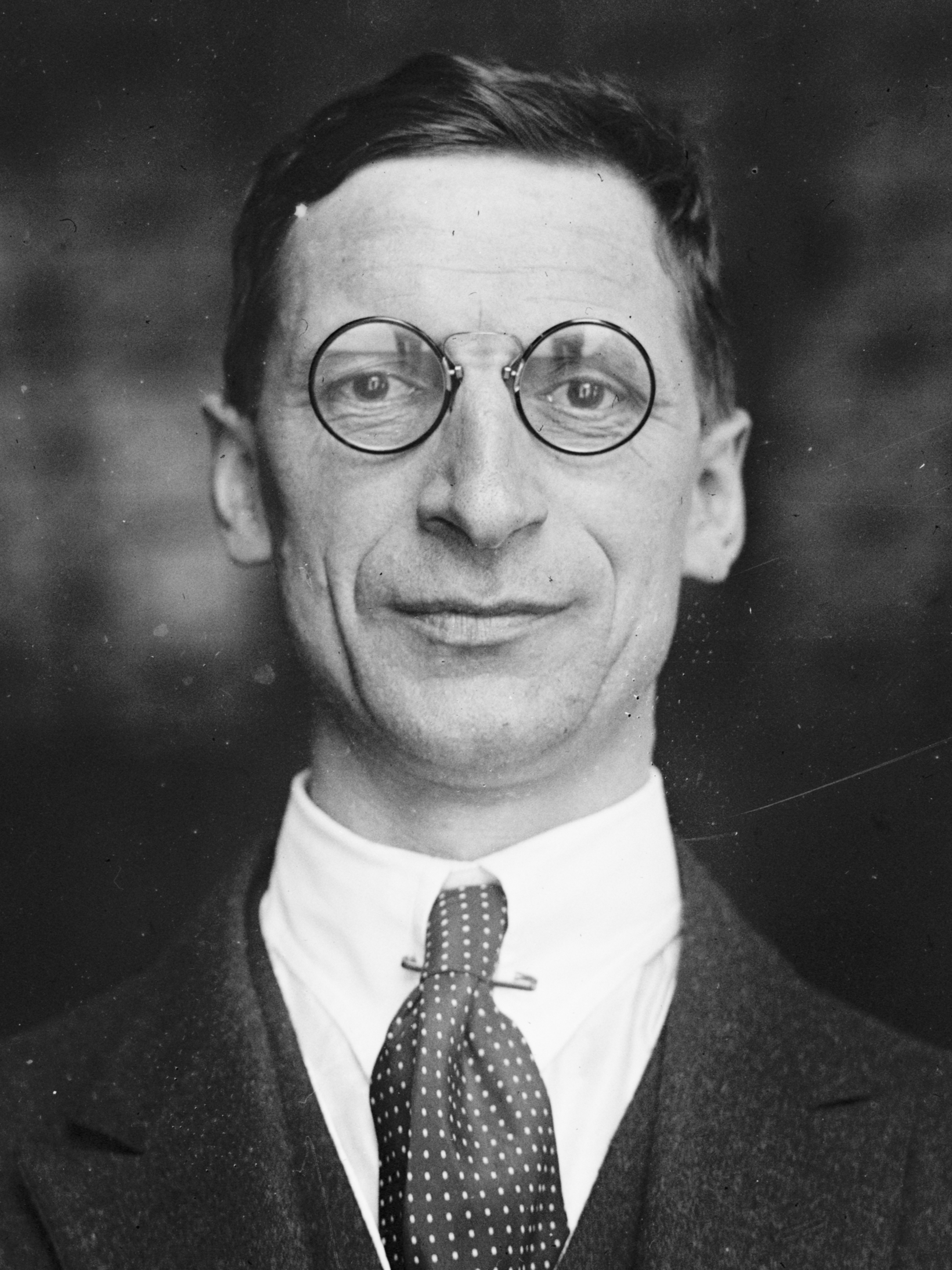
- Date formed: 26 August 1921
- Date dissolved: 9 January 1922

People and organisations
- President of the Republic: Éamon de Valera
- Total no. of members: 15 (inc. 9 non-members of cabinet)
- Member party: Sinn Féin
- Status in legislature: Majority government

History
- Election: 1921 general election
- Legislature term: 2nd Dáil
- Predecessor: 2nd ministry
- Successor: 4th ministry

The members of the 2nd Dáil first met on 16 August 1921. The outgoing ministry of Dáil Éireann did not resign immediately. On 26 August 1921, Éamon de Valera resigned as president. De Valera was then proposed by Seán Mac Eoin and seconded by Richard Mulcahy to the position of President of the Irish Republic and approved unanimously. This was a change of title, suggesting that de Valera was now considered as the head of state of the Irish Republic, rather than only its head of government.

De Valera then proposed the members of the 3rd ministry of the Irish Republic (26 August 1921 – 9 January 1922), which were approved by the Dáil.

Office	Name
President of the Republic	Éamon de Valera
Secretary of State for Foreign Affairs	Arthur Griffith
Secretary of State for Home Affairs	Austin Stack
Secretary of State for Defence	Cathal Brugha
Secretary of State for Finance	Michael Collins
Secretary of State for Local Government	W. T. Cosgrave
Secretary of State for Economic Affairs	Robert Barton
=== Ministers not in cabinet ===
Office	Name
Assistant Secretary of State for Local Government	Kevin O'Higgins
Secretary for Fine Arts	Count Plunkett
Secretary for Publicity	Desmond FitzGerald
Secretary for Education	John J. O'Kelly
Secretary for Labour	Constance Markievicz
Secretary for Trade and Commerce	Ernest Blythe
Secretary for Agriculture	Art O'Connor
Secretary for Fisheries	Seán Etchingham

== 4th ministry ==
Government of the 2nd Dáil; 4th ministry
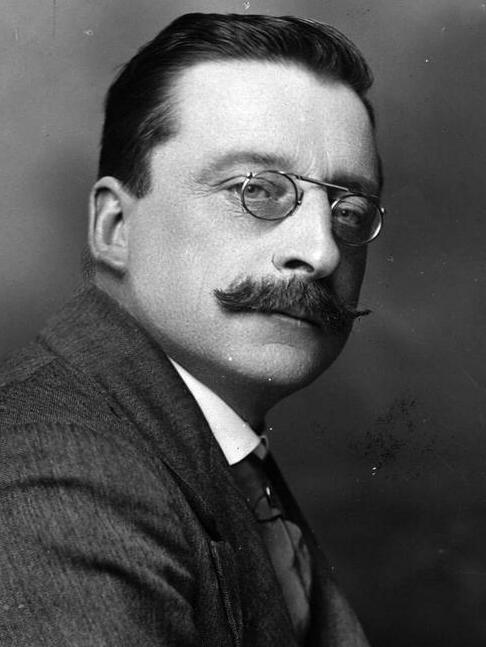
- Date formed: 10 January 1922
- Date dissolved: 9 September 1922

People and organisations
- President of Dáil Éireann: Arthur Griffith d. 12 August 1922
- Total no. of members: 14 (inc. 5 non-members of cabinet & 3 assistant ministers)
- Member party: Sinn Féin
- Status in legislature: Majority government

History
- Legislature term: 2nd Dáil
- Predecessor: 3rd ministry
- Successor: 5th ministry

On 7 January 1922, the Anglo-Irish Treaty was approved by Dáil Éireann in a vote of 64 to 57. Among those voting against were President de Valera. On Monday 9 January, he resigned as president. He was then proposed by Kathleen Clarke and seconded by Liam Mellowes for the position of president. This motion was defeated with 58 votes in favour to 60 against.

On 10 January, Arthur Griffith was proposed as President of Dáil Éireann by Michael Collins and seconded by Eoin O'Duffy. While the vote was to take place, de Valera and his supporters rose and left the Dáil chamber. Griffith was then approved unanimously by those members remaining in the Dáil. The members of the 4th ministry were then proposed by Griffith and approved by the Dáil.

Under the terms of the Treaty another cabinet, the provisional government, was also established on 16 January, with Michael Collins as Chairman of the Provisional Government of the Irish Free State. The 4th ministry therefore held office in parallel with the 1st provisional government. In August, Griffith died of natural causes and Collins was killed in action. The remaining members of the ministry remained in office until the 3rd Dáil elected a new ministry on 9 September under W. T. Cosgrave. Cosgrave had also been named as Chairman of the Provisional Government on the death of Collins in August, and from 9 September the personnel of the two cabinets were identical. Both cabinets were replaced by the Executive Council of the Irish Free State on 6 December 1922.

Office	Name
President of Dáil Éireann	Arthur Griffith
Minister for Finance	Michael Collins
Minister for Foreign Affairs	George Gavan Duffy
Minister for Foreign Affairs	Arthur Griffith (Note: Served from 26 July 1922 – 12 August 1922.)
Minister for Foreign Affairs	Michael Hayes (Note: Served from 21 August 1922 – 30 August 1922.)
Minister for Home Affairs	Eamonn Duggan
Minister for Local Government	W. T. Cosgrave
Minister for Economic Affairs	Kevin O'Higgins
Minister for Defence	Richard Mulcahy
=== Ministers not in cabinet ===
Office	Name
Minister for Education	Michael Hayes
Minister for Trade	Ernest Blythe
Minister for Agriculture	Patrick Hogan
Minister for Labour	Joseph McGrath
Minister for Publicity	Desmond FitzGerald
=== Assistant Ministers ===
Office	Name
Asst. Minister for Local Government	Lorcan Robbins (Note: Served from 11 January 1922 – 9 September 1922.)
Asst. Minister for Home Affairs	George Nicolls (Note: Served from 17 January 1922 – 9 September 1922.)
Asst. Minister for Education	Frank Fahy (Note: Served until 3 February 1922, appointment date is unknown.)

== 1st provisional government ==
Government of the 2nd Dáil 1st provisional government
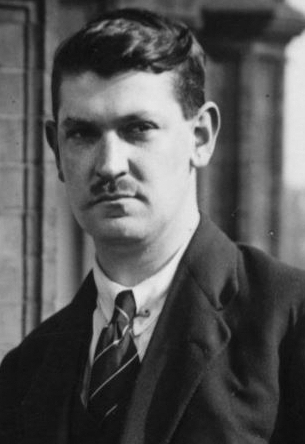
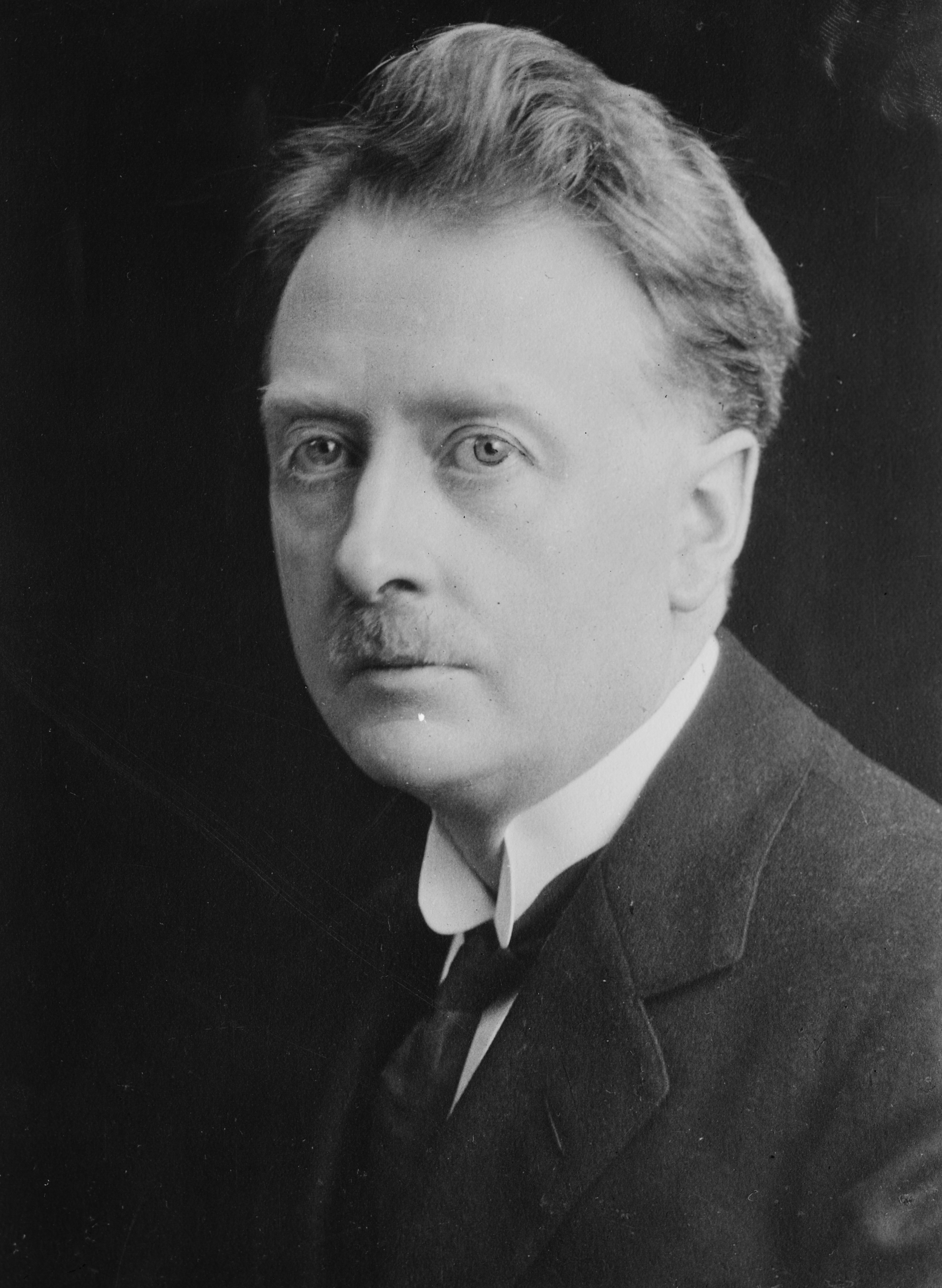
- Michael Collins, W. T. Cosgrave
- Date formed: 16 January 1922
- Date dissolved: 30 August 1922

People and organisations
- King: George V
- Lord Lieutenant: Lord FitzAlan
- Chairman of the Provisional Government: Michael Collins (Jan.–22 Aug. 1922); W. T. Cosgrave (22–30 Aug. 1922)
- Total no. of members: 13 (inc. 4 acting ministers)
- Member party: Sinn Féin
- Status in legislature: Majority government

History
- Legislature term: 2nd Dáil
- Successor: 2nd provisional government

The 1st provisional government was the provisional government that held office from 16 January – 30 August 1922. The provisional government was established under the terms of the Anglo-Irish Treaty as an interim administration that would govern Ireland (not including Northern Ireland) until the establishment of the Irish Free State in December. Its members were nominated at a meeting of "the members elected to sit in the House of Commons of Southern Ireland" (pro-Treaty Sinn Féin and four unionist members), on 14 January, and they took up office two days later. The British government formally transferred power to the cabinet on 1 April. Headed by Michael Collins as Chairman, its membership consisted solely of members of the pro-Treaty wing of Sinn Féin.

At the time the provisional government was established there was a pre-existing executive administration in the form of the 4th ministry of the Irish Republic, but that cabinet was not recognised by the British government. The 4th ministry had come to office on 10 January, just six days before the provisional government, and continued in office after the latter's establishment. There were thus two parallel administrations, with an overlapping membership.

After the Civil War began on 29 June four members of the cabinet were seconded for military service and substitutes were appointed to temporarily take their places as acting ministers. Two new members, Michael Hayes and Ernest Blythe, began serving as acting ministers on 17 July and were added to the cabinet as permanent members on 27 July. Collins was killed in action on 22 August and so the cabinet met and elected Cosgrave as chairman on 25 August. Five days later the entire cabinet was reconstituted as the 2nd provisional government. The 3rd Dáil met on 9 September and appointed the 5th ministry, with its membership identical to that of the newly constituted provisional government. This cabinet, with its dual identities, continued as the sole government, and was superseded on 6 December 1922 by the formation of the 1st Executive Council of the Irish Free State.

Office	Name
Chairman of the Provisional Government	Michael Collins (Note: Served until 22 August 1922.)
Chairman of the Provisional Government	W. T. Cosgrave (Note: Served from 25 August 1922 – 30 August 1922.)
Minister for Finance	Michael Collins (Note: Served from 16 January 1922 – 17 July 1922.)
Minister for Finance	W. T. Cosgrave (Note: Served as acting Minister for Finance from 17 July 1922 – 30 August 1922.)
Minister for Home Affairs	Eamonn Duggan
Minister for Local Government	W. T. Cosgrave
Minister for Economic Affairs	Kevin O'Higgins
Minister for Education	Fionán Lynch
Minister for Agriculture	Patrick Hogan
Minister for Labour	Joseph McGrath
Postmaster-General	J. J. Walsh
=== Substitutes ===
Office	Name
Acting Minister for Finance	W. T. Cosgrave
Acting Minister for Labour	Patrick Hogan
Acting Minister for Education	Michael Hayes
Acting Minister for Economic Affairs	Ernest Blythe

== See also ==
- Constitution of the Irish Free State
- Dáil Éireann
- Dáil Éireann (Irish Republic)
- Government of Ireland
- Politics of the Republic of Ireland
