= Dublin Castle administration =

Government of Ireland under English and later British rule

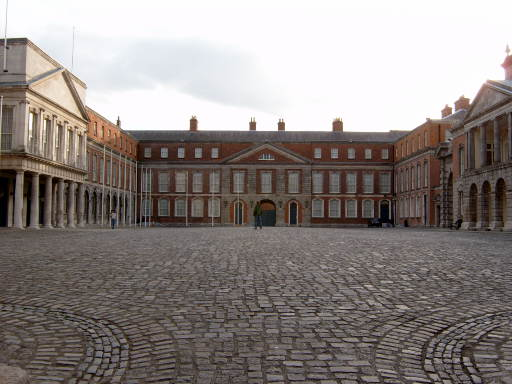
The Upper Courtyard of Dublin Castle. The Viceregal apartments are on the left.

The Dublin Castle administration was the central executive government of Ireland under English, and later British, rule from the Middle Ages until the creation of the Irish Free State in 1922. The name comes from Dublin Castle, which served as the administrative and ceremonial heart of British authority in Ireland. "Dublin Castle" is used metonymically to describe British rule in Ireland, particularly the executive and civil service that governed through the Lord Lieutenant of Ireland and senior officials such as the Chief Secretary for Ireland and Under-Secretary for Ireland.

The administration operated alongside the Parliament of Ireland (which existed until 1801) and the Privy Council of Ireland, implementing policies and managing patronage, taxation, and the civil service. Over time, the Chief Secretary for Ireland became the key political manager, while the Lord Lieutenant largely served a ceremonial and representative role.

== Head ==
The head of the administration or Chief governor of Ireland was variously known as the justiciar, the Lord Deputy, from the seventeenth century the Lord Lieutenant of Ireland (informally the Viceroy from the nineteenth century). Before 1707, he represented the government of the Kingdom of England, then that of the Kingdom of Great Britain, and finally from 1801 that of the United Kingdom. He was also the personal representative in Ireland of the monarch. When the chief governor was absent in England, his authority was exercised by three Lords Justices.

By the nineteenth century, the Lord Lieutenant was declining in importance by comparison with his chief aide, the Chief Secretary for Ireland: the British cabinet would invariably include the Chief Secretary, but only sometimes the Lord Lieutenant.

The Government of Ireland Act 1920 gave the Lord Lieutenant a new role, that of the Crown's representative in the two home rule jurisdictions of Northern Ireland and Southern Ireland. However, the Irish War of Independence and subsequent Civil War meant that Southern Ireland's institutions never came into operation and Northern Ireland's institutions were not established until 1921. Upon the independence of the Irish Free State from the United Kingdom in 1922, the Lord Lieutenancy was abolished, with its functions being transferred to the two new offices of Governor-General of the Irish Free State and Governor of Northern Ireland respectively.

== Other officers ==
Other major officers in the Dublin Castle administration included the Chief Secretary for Ireland, the Under-Secretary, the Lord Chancellor of Ireland, the Attorney-General for Ireland (briefly replaced under the Government of Ireland Act by the Attorney-General for Southern Ireland), and the Solicitor-General for Ireland. All of these posts were abolished in 1922. The Chief Secretary's office evolved into the administrative basis for the new President of the Executive Council of the Irish Free State, effectively the prime minister, with the Under Secretary's administrative role becoming that of the new chief civil servant in the Irish Government, the Secretary to the Executive Council.

== Irish Office ==
The Irish Office was established in Old Queen Street, London, after the Act of Union as a small outpost of the Chief Secretary's Office in Dublin, replacing the Lord Lieutenant's resident London secretary. Intended as a channel of communication between Dublin Castle and both Parliament and Whitehall, it was often bypassed and its few officials did little work until the late 19th century, when they drafted answers to the increasing stream of parliamentary questions which Irish Parliamentary Party MPs were asking the Chief Secretary. There was also a parliamentary draftsman for local and private bills relating to Ireland. When the Provisional Government took over in early 1922, the Chief Secretary's office in Dublin was closed and those of its senior officials who had been seconded from Whitehall were relocated to the Irish Office. The Irish Office was wound down after the collapse of the Irish Boundary Commission in 1925, and London's relations with the Irish Free State and Northern Ireland were transferred to the Dominions Office and Home Office respectively.

== Civil Service ==
Just as the English and British Civil Service ("His Majesty's Home Civil Service") evolved from the officials of the various government departments around Whitehall in London, so the corresponding officials in Dublin evolved into the Irish Civil Service. After the Partition of Ireland, most Irish civil servants transferred to either the Civil Service of the Irish Free State or the Civil Service of Northern Ireland. Those based in the Free State who were unsympathetic to the new regime were allowed to retire early on reduced pension.

== See also ==
- The Dublin Gazette

== Sources ==
- Costello, Peter (1999). Dublin Castle in the life of the Irish nation. Dublin: Wolfhound Press. ISBN 0-86327-610-5.
- McBride, Lawrence W. (1991). The Greening of Dublin Castle: the transformation of bureaucratic and judicial personnel in Ireland, 1892-1922. Catholic University of America Press. ISBN 9780813207155.
- McCarthy, Denis; Benton, David (2004). Dublin Castle: at the heart of Irish History. Dublin: Stationery Office. ISBN 9780755719754.
- McDowell, R. B. [Robert Brendan] (1964). The Irish Administration, 1801–1914. Studies in Irish History. Vol. s2 v2. Routledge & Kegan Paul; University of Toronto Press. OCLC 906125229 – via Internet Archive.
- Maguire, Martin (2008). The Civil Service and the Revolution in Ireland 1912-38: 'Shaking the Blood-stained Hand of Mr Collins' (PDF). Manchester University Press. ISBN 978-0-7190-7740-1.
- Morris, Maurice O'Connor (1889). Dublin Castle. Harrison.
- Smyth, Constantine J. (1839). Chronicle of the law officers of Ireland . London: Henry Butterworth.
- O'Neill, Ciaran (20 November 2024). Power and Powerlessness in Union Ireland: Life in a Palliative State. Oxford University Press. ISBN 978-0-19-266775-5.
- Sturgis, Mark; Coogan, Tim Pat (1999). Hopkinson, Michael (ed.). The last days of Dublin Castle: the Mark Sturgis diaries. Irish Academic Press. ISBN 9780716526261.
