= Government of the 3rd Dáil =

Governments of Ireland 1922 to 1923

The government of the 3rd Dáil was first both concurrently the 2nd provisional government (30 August – 6 December 1922) and the 5th ministry of Dáil Éireann (9 September – 6 December 1922), formed after the 1922 general election held on 16 June 1922, and then the 1st executive council of the Irish Free State (6 December 1922 – 19 September 1923), formed after the establishment of the Irish Free State. They were led by W. T. Cosgrave, who had become the leader of the Pro-Treaty wing of Sinn Féin and on 27 April 1923 became the first leader of the Cumann na nGaedheal.

The 2nd provisional government and the 5th ministry lasted for overlapping concurrent periods of 98 days and 88 days respectively. The 1st executive council lasted for 287 days.

== 2nd provisional government and 5th ministry ==
Government of the 3rd Dáil; 2nd provisional government and 5th ministry
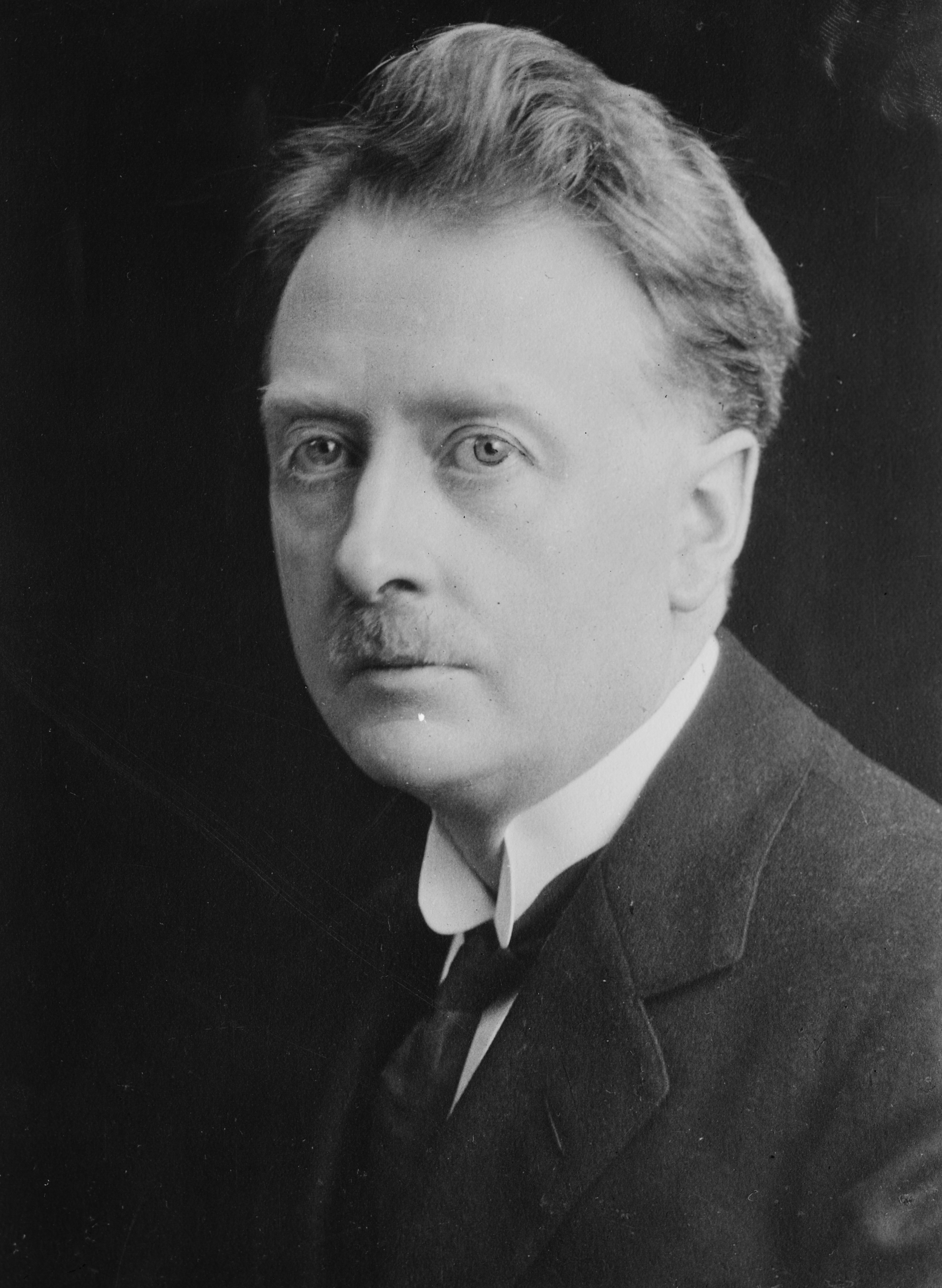
- Date formed: 30 August 1922 (PG); 9 September 1922 (DM)
- Date dissolved: 6 December 1922

People and organisations
- King: George V
- Lord Lieutenant: Lord FitzAlan
- Chairman of the Provisional Government and President of Dáil Éireann: W. T. Cosgrave
- Total no. of members: 11
- Member parties: Sinn Féin (Pro-Treaty)
- Status in legislature: Minority government
- Opposition party: Labour Party
- Opposition leader: Thomas Johnson

History
- Election: 1922 general election
- Legislature term: 3rd Dáil
- Predecessor: 1st provisional government; 4th ministry
- Successor: 1st executive council

The 2nd provisional government (30 August 1922 – 6 December 1922) was formed by W. T. Cosgrave, who had been appointed as Chairman of the Provisional Government on 25 August 1922, after the death of Michael Collins on 22 August, who had led the 1st provisional government from 16 January 1922.

Arthur Griffith, the President of the Dáil who had led the 4th Ministry from 10 January 1922, had died on 12 August. The members of the 3rd Dáil first met on 9 September 1922. W. T. Cosgrave was proposed as President of the Dáil by Richard Mulcahy and seconded by Eoin MacNeill. This motion was carried and Cosgrave and formed the 5th Ministry (9 September 1922 – 6 December 1922), composed of Pro-Treaty members of Sinn Féin and identical in composition to the 2nd provisional government. With these appointments, the dual cabinets which had existed from January 1922 came to an end, with Cosgrave serving as both Chairman of the Provisional Government and President of Dáil Éireann. Both cabinets were abolished when the new Constitution of the Irish Free State came into force on 6 December 1922.

Office	Name
Chairman of the Provisional Government	W. T. Cosgrave
President of Dáil Éireann	W. T. Cosgrave
Minister for Finance	W. T. Cosgrave
Minister for Foreign Affairs	Desmond FitzGerald
Minister for Home Affairs	Kevin O'Higgins
Minister for Local Government	Ernest Blythe
Minister for Agriculture	Patrick Hogan
Minister for Industry and Commerce	Joseph McGrath
Minister for Education	Eoin MacNeill
Minister for Defence	Richard Mulcahy
Postmaster-General	J. J. Walsh
Minister without portfolio	Fionán Lynch
Minister without portfolio	Eamonn Duggan

== 1st executive council of the Irish Free State ==
Government of the 3rd Dáil
- 1st Executive Council of the Irish Free State
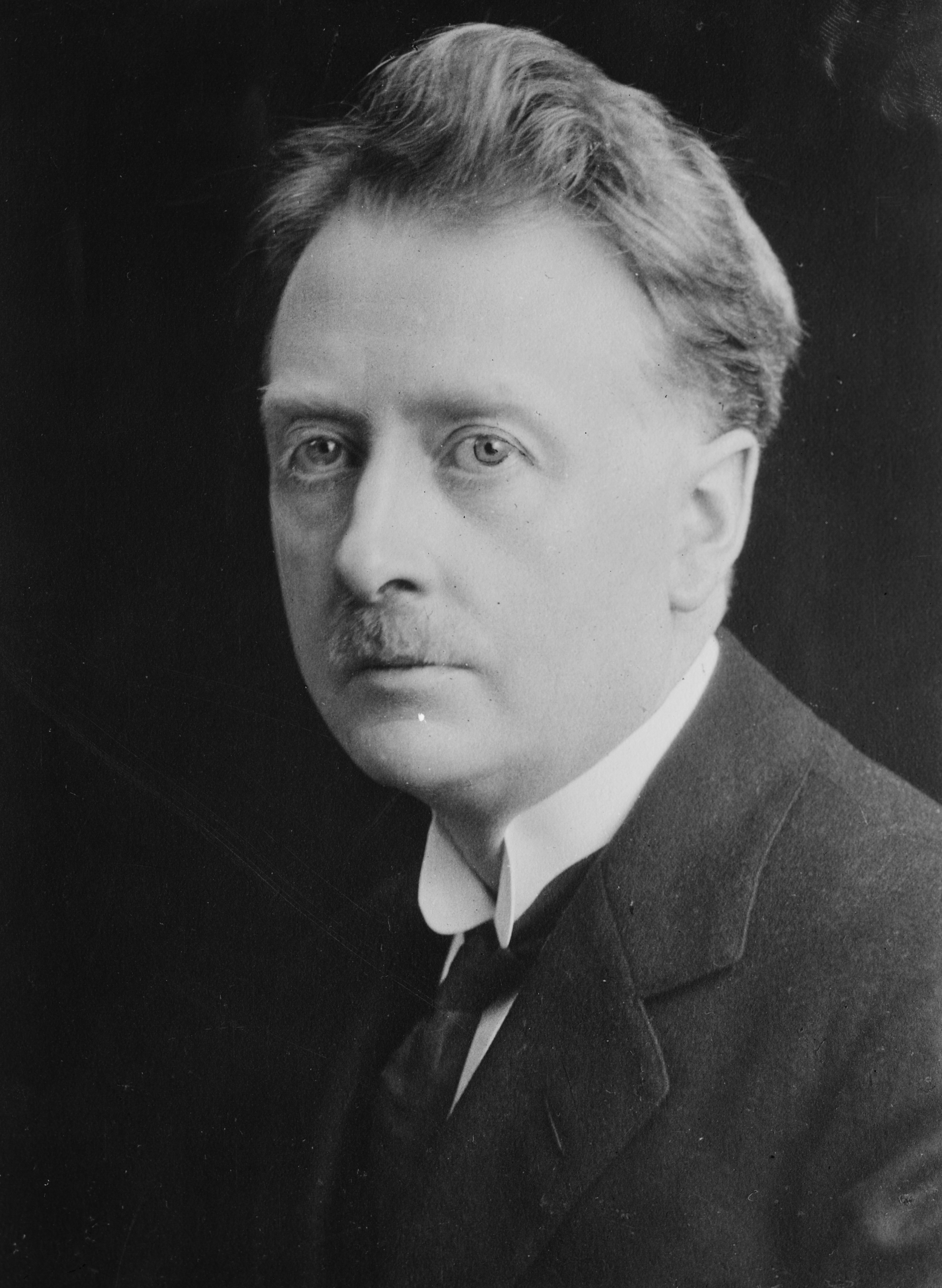
- Date formed: 6 December 1922
- Date dissolved: 19 September 1923

People and organisations
- King: George V
- Governor-General: Tim Healy
- President of the Executive Council: W. T. Cosgrave
- Vice-President of the Executive Council: Kevin O'Higgins
- Total no. of members: 10 (inc. 3 non-members of the Executive Council)
- Member parties: Sinn Féin (Pro-Treaty) (Dec. 1922 – Apr. 1923); Cumann na nGaedheal (Apr.–Sep. 1923)
- Status in legislature: Minority government
- Opposition party: Labour Party
- Opposition leader: Thomas Johnson

History
- Legislature terms: 3rd Dáil; 1st Seanad (1922–1925)
- Predecessor: 2nd provisional government
- Successor: 2nd executive council

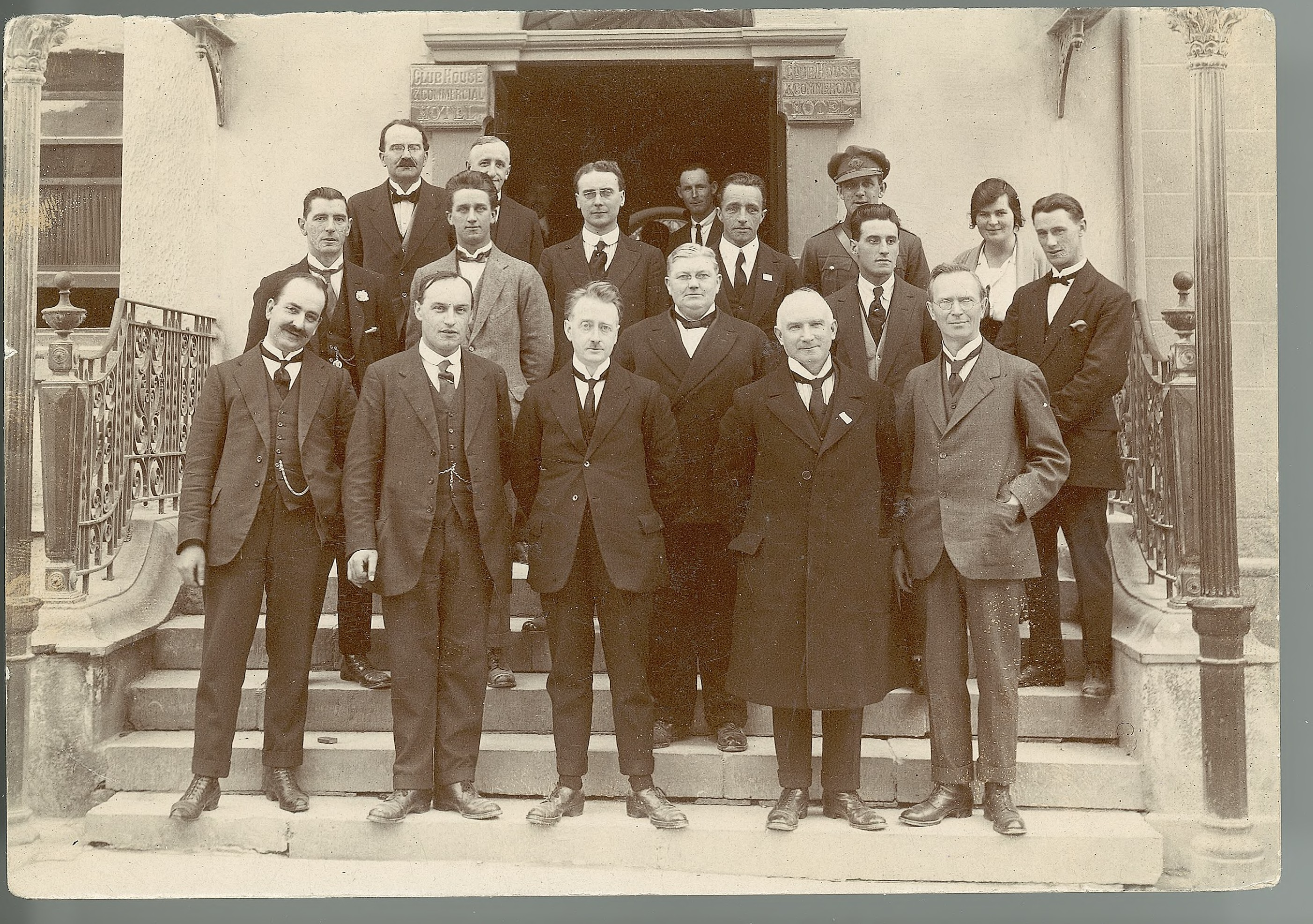
Cumann na nGaedheal government 1922–1923

The 1st Executive Council of the Irish Free State (6 December 1922 – 19 September 1923) was formed by Pro-Treaty faction of Sinn Féin, which became Cumann na nGaedheal in April 1923. On 6 December 1922, the Constitution of the Irish Free State came into force. William T. Cosgrave was proposed as President of the Executive Council by Peter Hughes and seconded by Francis McGuinness, and this motion was approved by the Dáil.

The President nominated the members of the Executive Council on 6 December.

Office	Name
President of the Executive Council	W. T. Cosgrave
Minister for Finance	W. T. Cosgrave
Vice-President of the Executive Council	Kevin O'Higgins
Minister for Home Affairs	Kevin O'Higgins
Minister for Defence	Richard Mulcahy
Minister for Education	Eoin MacNeill
Minister for External Affairs	Desmond FitzGerald
Minister for Industry and Commerce	Joseph McGrath
Minister for Local Government	Ernest Blythe

=== Ministers not members of the Executive Council ===
The following Ministers were proposed by a committee of the Dáil on 14 December 1922.

Office	Name
Minister for Agriculture and Lands	Patrick Hogan
Minister for Fisheries	Fionán Lynch
Postmaster-General	J. J. Walsh

=== Parliamentary secretaries ===
The Executive Council appointed the following Parliamentary secretaries. These were newly created offices.

Name	Office
Daniel McCarthy	Government Chief Whip
Eamonn Duggan	Parliamentary secretary to the Executive Council

== See also ==
- Dáil Éireann
- Dáil Éireann (Irish Republic)
- Dáil Éireann (Irish Free State)
- Government of Ireland
- Politics of the Republic of Ireland
