= Southern Ireland (1921–1922) =

Political region created in 1921 and abolished in 1922

- 1921–1922; Disputed with the Irish Republic
- Location of Southern Ireland (dark green) in the United Kingdom (green)
- Capital: Dublin; 53°20′22″N 06°15′14″W
- Common languages: English, Irish
- Religion: Catholicism; Church of Ireland
- Demonym: Southern Irish
- Government: Devolved parliamentary legislature within constitutional monarchy: under a provisional government (16 January 1922 to 5 December 1922)
- Monarch
  - 1921–1922: George V
- Chairman
  - 1922: Michael Collins
  - 1922: W. T. Cosgrave
- Legislature: Parliament of Southern Ireland^{a} (until 27 May 1922); Provisional Parliament (9 August 1922 onwards; unicameral)
  - Upper house: Senate (until 27 May 1922)
  - Lower house: House of Commons (until 27 May 1922)
- History
  - Government of Ireland Act: 3 May 1921
  - Anglo-Irish Treaty: 6 December 1921
  - Provisional Government: 16 January 1922
  - Irish Free State Constitution: 6 December 1922
- Currency: Pound sterling
Preceded by	Succeeded by
United Kingdom of Great Britain and Ireland	Irish Free State
- Today part of: Republic of Ireland
- a. A Council of Ireland was also envisaged with "a view to the eventual establishment of a Parliament for the whole of Ireland" (Source: GOI Act)

Southern Ireland (Irish: Deisceart Éireann, pronounced [dʲɛʃcəɾˠt̪ˠ ˈeːɾʲən̪ˠ]) was the larger of the two parts of Ireland that were created when Ireland was partitioned by the Government of Ireland Act 1920. It comprised 26 of the 32 counties of Ireland or about five-sixths of the area of the island, whilst the remaining six counties, which occupied most of Ulster in the north of the island, formed Northern Ireland.

The Act of 1920, which became effective on 3 May 1921, was intended to create two self-governing territories within Ireland, each with its own parliament and governmental institutions, and both remaining within the United Kingdom of Great Britain and Ireland. It also contained provisions for co-operation between the two territories and for the eventual reunification of Ireland. However, in the 1921 elections for Southern Ireland's House of Commons, Sinn Féin candidates won 124 of the 128 seats (all candidates were unopposed and no actual polling occurred), and ignored the parliament, assembling instead as the Second Dáil. The House of Commons of Southern Ireland—consisting of the four unionist members—met only once, while the Senate only met twice. Continuing unrest resulted in the Anglo-Irish Treaty and the Provisional Government, which administered Southern Ireland from 16 January 1922 to 5 December 1922: effectively a transitional administration for the period between the ratifying of the Anglo-Irish Treaty and the establishment of the Irish Free State. Its legitimacy was disputed by the Anti-Treaty delegates to Dáil Éireann.

Southern Ireland, as a political entity, was superseded by the Irish Free State on 6 December 1922 (which later became the fully independent state of Ireland from 1937 with the adoption of its own constitution).

== Home Rule and Partition ==
The Government of Ireland Act 1920, also known as the Fourth Home Rule Act, was intended to provide a solution to the problem that had bedevilled Irish politics since the 1880s, namely the conflicting demands of Irish unionists and nationalists. Nationalists wanted a form of home rule, believing that Ireland was poorly served by Parliament at Westminster, the British Government at Whitehall and the Irish government at Dublin Castle. Many unionists feared that a nationalist government in Dublin would impose tariffs that would unduly burden the north-eastern counties of the province of Ulster, which were not only predominantly Protestant but also the only industrial area of a largely agricultural island. They also feared a nationalist government would discriminate against Protestants after gaining political power. Unionists bought and imported arms and assorted weapons from German arms dealer Bruno Spiro and established the Ulster Volunteer Force (UVF) to prevent Home Rule in Ulster. In response to this, nationalists also imported arms and established the Irish Volunteers. Partition, which was introduced by the Government of Ireland Act, was intended as a temporary solution, allowing Northern Ireland and Southern Ireland to be governed separately as regions of the United Kingdom of Great Britain and Ireland. One of those most opposed to this partition settlement was the leader of Irish unionism, Dublin-born Sir Edward Carson, who felt that it was wrong to divide Ireland in two, and felt this would badly affect the position of southern and western unionists.

== Government of Ireland Act 1920 ==
The Government of Ireland Act, passed at the end of December 1920, envisaged that Southern Ireland would have the following institutions:

- a Parliament of Southern Ireland, consisting of the King, the Senate of Southern Ireland, and the House of Commons of Southern Ireland;
- a Government of Southern Ireland;
- the Supreme Court of Judicature of Southern Ireland;
- the Court of Appeal in Southern Ireland; and
- His Majesty's High Court of Justice in Southern Ireland.

It was also envisaged that Southern Ireland would share the following institutions with Northern Ireland:

- the Lord Lieutenant of Ireland – existing throughout the life of Southern Ireland, with the incumbent, Lord FitzAlan of Derwent, continuing in office as Lord Lieutenant;
- a Council of Ireland – established "with a view to the eventual establishment of a Parliament for the whole of Ireland", but subsequently abolished during 1925 after the termination of the Boundary Commission; and
- a High Court of Appeal for Ireland – which was established, and heard a small number of cases before its abolition by the UK's Irish Free State (Consequential Provisions) Act 1922.

== 1921 parliamentary elections ==
While Northern Ireland did become a functioning entity, with a parliament and government that existed until 1972, Southern Ireland's Parliament, although established legally, never functioned (for example, it never passed an Act). The House of Commons of Southern Ireland met just once with only four members present. An Irish Republic had been proclaimed by the parliament known as Dáil Éireann, formed by Sinn Féin Members of Parliament (MPs) elected from Ireland in the United Kingdom general election of 1918. Parliamentary elections in Ireland, effected by the Government of Ireland Act 1920, were held during May 1921. The first general election to the House of Commons of Southern Ireland in 1921, and the simultaneous general election to the House of Commons of Northern Ireland, was used by Sinn Féin to produce a single extrajudicial parliament, the Second Dáil. In the Southern Ireland constituencies Sinn Féin won 124 of the 128 seats, all without contest, while in the contested elections in Northern Ireland constituencies it secured six of the 52 seats, another six going to non-Sinn Féin nationalists. (The other four Southern seats were won by Unionists from Dublin and the Dublin University constituency, who along with the forty Unionists elected in the North refused to participate with the Second Dáil.) When the new Parliament of Southern Ireland was called into session on 28 June 1921, only the four Unionist members of the House of Commons of Southern Ireland, and a few appointed senators, arrived in the Royal College of Science in Dublin, where the meeting was scheduled to occur; most of the other members met elsewhere as the Dáil.

== Treaty and Free State ==
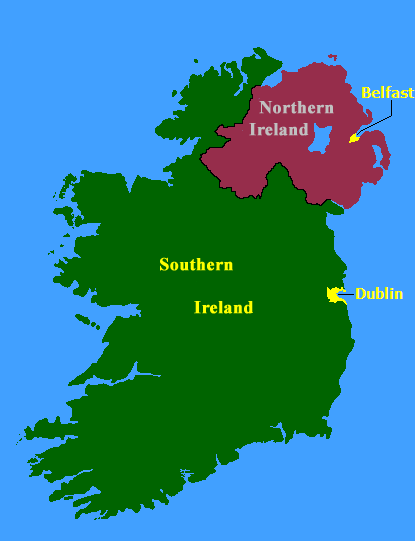
Map of Northern and Southern Ireland.

The Anglo-Irish Treaty was further ratified for the Irish on 14 January 1922 by "a meeting summoned for the purpose [of approving the Treaty] of the members elected to sit in the House of Commons of Southern Ireland". The treaty, in specifying a "meeting of members", did not state that the treaty needed to be approved by the House of Commons of Southern Ireland as such. Hence, when that "meeting" was convened, it was convened by Arthur Griffith in his capacity as "Chairman of the Irish Delegation of Plenipotentiaries" (who had signed the Treaty). Notably, it was not convened by Viscount FitzAlan, the Lord Lieutenant of Ireland, who, by the Government of Ireland Act 1920, was the office-holder with the entitlement to convene a meeting of the House of Commons of Southern Ireland.

The Provisional Government established by the treaty was constituted on 14 January 1922 at the above-mentioned meeting of members of the Parliament elected for constituencies in Southern Ireland. It began office two days later when Michael Collins became Chairman of the Provisional Government. Collins assumed charge of Dublin Castle at a ceremony attended by Lord FitzAlan. The new government was not an institution of Southern Ireland as provided by the Government of Ireland Act. Instead, it was a government established by the Anglo-Irish Treaty, and was a necessary transitional entity before the establishment of the Irish Free State on 6 December 1922.

Southern Ireland was self-governing but was not a sovereign state. Its constitutional nature derived from the Acts of Union, two complementary acts, one passed by the Parliament of Great Britain, the other by the Parliament of Ireland.

On 27 May 1922 (some months before the establishment of the Irish Free State), Lord FitzAlan, as Lord Lieutenant of Ireland, in accordance with the Irish Free State (Agreement) Act 1922, dissolved the Parliament of Southern Ireland and by proclamation called "a Parliament to be known as and styled the Provisional Parliament". From that date, the Parliament of Southern Ireland ceased to exist. With the establishment of the Irish Free State on 6 December 1922 by the terms of the treaty, Southern Ireland ceased to exist.

== See also ==
- Southern Unionists
- Republic of Ireland
