= 3rd Dáil =

Dáil Éireann as it convened from 9 September 1922 until 9 August 1923

←	2nd Dáil	4th Dáil	→

Overview
- Legislative body: Dáil Éireann
- Jurisdiction: Irish Republic; Southern Ireland; Irish Free State
- Meeting place: UCD (Earlsfort Terrace); Leinster House
- Term: 9 September 1922 – 9 August 1923
- Election: 1922 general election
- Government: Government of the 3rd Dáil
- Members: 128
- Ceann Comhairle: Michael Hayes

Sessions
- 1st: 9 September 1922 – 9 August 1923

The 3rd Dáil was elected at the general election held on 16 June 1922. This election was required to be held under the Anglo-Irish Treaty signed on 6 December 1921. It first met on 9 September and until 6 December 1922, it was the Provisional Parliament or the Constituent Assembly of Southern Ireland. From 6 December 1922, it was the lower house (Dáil Éireann) of the Oireachtas of the Irish Free State, until its dissolution on 9 August 1923.

== Article 17 of the Anglo-Irish Treaty ==
Article 17 of the Anglo-Irish Treaty provided:

By way of provisional arrangement for the administration of Southern Ireland during the interval which must elapse between the date hereof [6 December 1921] and the constitution of a Parliament and Government of the Irish Free State [This ultimately occurred on 6 December 1922] in accordance therewith, steps shall be taken forthwith for summoning a meeting of members of Parliament elected for constituencies in Southern Ireland since the passing of the Government of Ireland Act, 1920, and for constituting a provisional Government, and the British Government shall take the steps necessary to transfer to such provisional Government the powers and machinery requisite for the discharge of its duties, provided that every member of such provisional Government shall have signified in writing his or her acceptance of this instrument [the Treaty]. But this arrangement shall not continue in force beyond the expiration of twelve months from the date hereof.

Article 17 therefore envisaged by way of "provisional arrangement" the creation of a provisional government. For the purposes of giving effect to Article 17, Section 1(2) of the Irish Free State (Agreement) Act 1922, an act of the Parliament of the United Kingdom, provided:

- the British Government could by Orders in Council transfer powers to the Provisional Government of Ireland;
- the Parliament of Southern Ireland would be dissolved within four months from the passing of the Act; and
- elections would be held for "the House of the Parliament" to which the Provisional Government would be responsible. The Act did not give a name to that Parliament, but said that in matters within the jurisdiction of the Provisional Government (i.e. only certain matters concerning Southern Ireland), it would have power to make laws in like manner as the Parliament of the Irish Free State when constituted. This last-mentioned "House of the Parliament" is what is more commonly referred to as the 3rd Dáil.

== Election of the 3rd Dáil/Provisional Parliament ==
The election to the 3rd Dáil took place on 16 June 1922. It occurred under the system of proportional representation by means of the single transferable vote. Unlike the Second Dáil, which included members from the whole island of Ireland, the 3rd Dáil did not include members elected from Northern Ireland. Since the largely uncontested election of the Second Dáil in 1921, the Anglo-Irish Treaty had been negotiated, and Sinn Féin—the only political party represented in the Dáil—had split into pro- and anti-Treaty factions; these two factions became the major contestants of the 1922 election, and other parties stood for the first time.

On 20 May Arthur Griffith read out to the Second Dáil the agreed pre-election Sinn Féin "Pact", and also declared new elections for the constituencies of the former Southern Ireland, and this was agreed to unanimously. Griffith could not call elections in Northern Ireland because of the Treaty provision that: ... no election shall be held for the return of members to serve in the Parliament of the Irish Free State for constituencies in Northern Ireland.

Despite the pact between the two Sinn Féin factions, the elections were seen by many as an endorsement of the Anglo-Irish Treaty, and a draft of the proposed Constitution of the Irish Free State was published in the week before election as an example of the work under way. The pro-treaty side won a majority of seats; the anti-treaty faction boycotted the new assembly, refusing to recognise the body as the legitimate heir to the Second Dáil, and the Irish Civil War broke out shortly afterwards.

== Rival political theories ==
The assembly was:

- the 3rd Dáil, the successor of the First Dáil (1919–1921) and the Second Dáil (1921–1922) according to Irish political theory; and
- the Provisional Parliament, the successor of the House of Commons of Southern Ireland (1921–1922) according to British political theory.

From both perspectives, it was a constituent assembly which created the constitution of the Irish Free State.

Ireland since 1919 had been governed under two rival political administrations. To nationalists and republicans, an assembly of Irish members of parliament (who adopted the equivalent Irish language term Teachta Dála or TD) had formed in Dublin in 1919 and was seen as the valid parliament of the Irish people, from which the Irish Republic received its sovereignty. Each Dáil in turn was the successor of the earlier one and the legitimate parliament of the Irish Republic. The Second Dáil had been chosen through an election in 1921 called by the British administration in Ireland, the elected republican members forming themselves into the Second Dáil rather than the Parliament of Southern Ireland they had been elected to. The Second Dáil agreed to the elections leading to the 3rd Dáil.

However, according to British political theory, the assembly of Irish MPs in Dublin did not constitute a valid parliament, and was subsequently declared illegal. In this view, legal government remained vested in His Majesty's Government in Westminster, and its Irish executive, under the Lord Lieutenant of Ireland based in Dublin Castle. The Government of Ireland Act 1920 created two Irish parliaments with effect from May 1921: one for Northern Ireland in Belfast and one for Southern Ireland, which was called to assemble in Royal College of Science in Dublin. The uncontested elections in Southern Ireland produced the House of Commons of Southern Ireland, though when the new house was called to assemble, only four MPs turned up. The remaining members assembled as TDs of the Second Dáil. Following the Anglo-Irish Treaty, the Westminster parliament passed the Irish Free State (Agreement) Act 1922 which provided for dissolution of the Parliament of Southern Ireland and the election of a replacement parliament to which the Provisional Government would be responsible. The Act named this parliament as "the House of the Parliament", perhaps to distinguish it from the Houses of parliament at Westminster.

== Two governments, two parliaments ==
Under the Treaty, procedures were set in place to merge the republican and British systems. Initially both remained separate to validate the Treaty from their own perspectives. The Second Dáil and the House of Commons of Southern Ireland both voted separately to ratify the Treaty. Each house chose distinct and separate governments but which substantially overlapped in membership. Arthur Griffith was elected as President of Dáil Éireann on 10 January 1922 and formed a new Ministry of Dáil Éireann, while Michael Collins was appointed as Chairman of the Provisional Government on 16 January 1922 and formed the Provisional Government of Ireland. The Proclamation by the Provisional Government which called the body stated that it was made "pursuant to the provisions of ... an Act entitled the Irish Free State (Agreement) Act, 1922".

On 12 August, Arthur Griffith died of natural causes and on 22 August Michael Collins was assassinated. On 25 August, W. T. Cosgrave was appointed to succeed Collins as Chairman of the Provisional Government. He formed the 2nd Provisional Government on 30 August.

== First meeting of the 3rd Dáil ==
The 3rd Dáil was first due to meet on 1 July. It was prorogued on five occasions, with its first meeting successively postponed to 15 July, to 29 July, to 12 August, to 16 August, and finally to 9 September. On this date, W. T. Cosgrave was appointed as President of Dáil Éireann. He formed the 5th Ministry of Dáil Éireann, with the same membership as the 2nd Provisional Government.

Whether the new house, the 3rd Dáil/Provisional Parliament, was a republican parliament or crown assembly was queried by some anti-Treaty Irish republicans. Laurence Ginnell turned up in the assembly to demand an answer as to which category, crown or republic, it belonged. The Ceann Comhairle read a message from Lord Lieutenant of Ireland Lord FitzAlan "conveying to this Parliament his very best wishes", which suggests that both the Lord Lieutenant and the Ceann Comhairle considered this body one convened under the terms of the Treaty rather than Dáil of the Irish Republic.

== Enactment of the Constitution – two systems become one ==
The Constitution of the Irish Free State provided, within its own articles, that it would not come into effect until it had been adopted by both the British Parliament and the 3rd Dáil, which it referred to as the "constituent assembly". The 3rd Dáil adopted the Constitution of the Irish Free State on 25 October 1922. The document was then enacted by the British Parliament by the Irish Free State Constitution Act 1922 and came into force on 6 December. The new constitution used the name Dáil Éireann for the house of representatives of a new parliament called the Oireachtas. However it provided that until the first elections to this new lower house the "constituent assembly" would exercise "all the powers and authorities" conferred on the "new" Dáil Éireann. The 3rd Dáil therefore functioned as a legislative lower house from December 1922 until it was dissolved on 9 August 1923 before the 1923 general election. The Fourth Dáil was convened on 19 September 1923. The numbering system of Dála begins with the First Dáil convened in January 1919.

== See also ==
- Government of the 3rd Dáil
- Members of the 3rd Dáil
- Executive Council of the Irish Free State
- History of Ireland
- Irish War of Independence
