= Ministry of Dáil Éireann =

Revolutionary Irish government, 1919 to 1922

The ministry of Dáil Éireann (Irish: Aireacht Dáil Éireann) was the cabinet of the 1919–1922 Irish Republic during the Irish War of Independence. The ministry was originally established by the Dáil Constitution adopted by the First Dáil on 21 January 1919, after it issued the Declaration of Independence. This constitution provided for a cabinet consisting of a head of government, known as the Príomh Aire or President of Dáil Éireann, and four other ministers. The Irish Republic modelled itself on the parliamentary system of government and so its cabinet was appointed by and answerable to the Dáil. Under the constitution the President was elected by the Dáil, while the remaining ministers were nominated by the President and then ratified by the Dáil. The Dáil could dismiss both the cabinet as a whole and individual ministers by passing a resolution. Ministers could also be dismissed by the President.

A number of changes were made to the cabinet system after its adoption in January 1919. The number of ministers was increased in April 1919. As established in 1919, the Irish Republic had no explicit head of state; in 1921 the head of the ministry was renamed as President of the Republic. For a brief period the members of this president's cabinet became known as "secretaries of state" rather than ministers. When the Fourth ministry assumed office in 1922 after the approval of the Anglo-Irish Treaty, with Arthur Griffith as its head, cabinet members were once again described as ministers and Griffith adopted the title of President of Dáil Éireann.

For much of 1922, the ministry governed in parallel with the Provisional Government, an interim administration established on 16 January 1922 under the Anglo-Irish Treaty, with Michael Collins as its Chairman and the membership of the two cabinets overlapped. On 25 August, W. T. Cosgrave was appointed as Chairman of the Provisional Government, after Collins had been killed on 22 August, and on 9 September, Cosgrave was also appointed as President of Dáil Éireann, succeeding Griffith who had died on 12 August. The ministry was then effectively the same as the Second provisional government. On 6 December 1922, when the Irish Free State came into being, both the ministry and the provisional government were superseded by the Executive Council of the Irish Free State.

== List of Ministries ==
Dáil	Election	Formed	Ministry	President	Party
1st	1918	22 January 1919	1st ministry	Cathal Brugha	Sinn Féin
1st	1918	1 April 1919	2nd ministry	Éamon de Valera	Sinn Féin
2nd	1921	26 August 1921	3rd ministry	Éamon de Valera	Sinn Féin
2nd	1921	10 January 1922	4th ministry	Arthur Griffith	Sinn Féin (Pro-Treaty)
3rd	1922	9 September 1922	5th ministry	W. T. Cosgrave	Sinn Féin (Pro-Treaty)
