= President of the Executive Council of the Irish Free State =

Head of government of the Irish Free State from 1922 to 1937

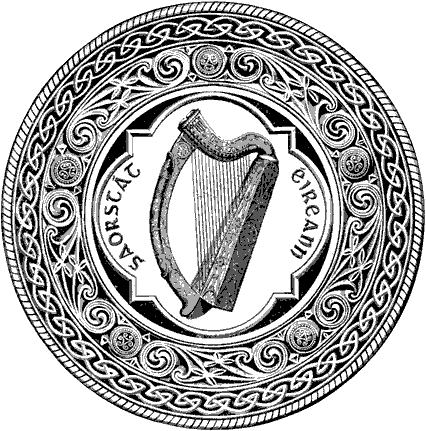
- Great Seal of the Irish Free State
- Appointer: Governor-General, upon the nomination of Dáil Éireann
- Precursor: Chairman of the Provisional Government of the Irish Free State
- Formation: 6 December 1922
- First holder: W. T. Cosgrave
- Final holder: Éamon de Valera
- Abolished: 29 December 1937
- Succession: Taoiseach

The President of the Executive Council of the Irish Free State (Irish: Uachtarán ar Ard-Chomhairle Shaorstát Éireann) was the head of government or prime minister of the Irish Free State which existed from 1922 to 1937. He was the chairman of the Executive Council of the Irish Free State, the Free State's cabinet. The President was appointed by the Governor-General, upon the nomination of Dáil Éireann (the lower house of the Oireachtas of parliament) and had to enjoy the confidence of the Dáil to remain in office. The office was succeeded by that of Taoiseach, though subsequent Taoisigh are numbered from the first President of the Executive Council.

== Appointment ==
The President of the Executive Council was nominated by the Dáil from among its members and then formally appointed by the Governor-General, though the Governor-General was bound by constitutional convention to honour the Dáil's choice.

On paper, executive authority was vested in the Governor-General, with the Executive Council empowered to "aid and advise" him. However, the Constitution stipulated that the Governor-General could only exercise his powers in accordance with constitutional practice established in Canada. Thus, with few exceptions, the Governor-General was required to act on the advice of the Executive Council, making its President the Free State's de facto political leader.

Once he had appointed the President, the Governor-General appointed the remaining members of the Executive Council on the President's nomination. The President had the freedom to choose any Vice-President (deputy prime minister) he wished from among the members of the Dáil, but the remainder of the Council had to be approved by a vote of consent in the Dáil before they could assume office. If he ceased to "retain the support of a majority in Dáil Éireann," the President, along with his ministerial colleagues, was obliged to resign, but could continue to serve as acting President until the appointment of a successor.

The method of appointment of the President of the Executive Council was through a commission of the Monarch or Governor-General, either the leader of the party with a majority of seats in the Dáil, if no party commanded an absolute majority, whichever leader he believed would be best able to avoid a vote of no confidence.

== Powers ==
The office of the President of the Executive Council was less powerful than either its modern equivalent, the office of Taoiseach, or the offices of most modern prime ministers in countries with a parliamentary system of government. In particular, the powers of the President were subject to two important limitations:

- He could not advise the Governor-General to dismiss a minister. Rather, the Executive Council had to be disbanded and reformed as a whole in order to replace a single minister.
- He could not request a dissolution of the Oireachtas on his own initiative. This could only be done by the Executive Council acting collectively.

The result of these restrictions was, according to Brian Farrell, that the President of the Executive Council was closer to being the Council's chairman or presiding officer, than its dominant leader. Nonetheless a strong president could exercise authority beyond the limits laid down in the 1922 constitution. (Note: See Brian Farrell, Chairman or chief? : the role of Taoiseach in Irish government, 1971.) The President's weak position arose from the fact that the status of his office was modelled on that of the prime minister of the United Kingdom before 1918. Until 1918, the British Prime Minister's powers had been theoretically quite limited and, as a member of the cabinet, the office-holder was regarded strictly as primus inter pares. Under Prime Minister David Lloyd George, however, from 1918 onwards, the powers of the office increased, as Lloyd George unilaterally arrogated to himself a number of powers that had previously belonged to the Cabinet collectively, including, most significantly, the right to seek a parliamentary dissolution.

In 1931, the Statute of Westminster 1931 removed nearly all of the UK Parliament's authority to legislate for the Irish Free State, which effectively gave it de jure independence. Soon after the Statute's passage, the Free State sought, and was granted, the right to have an Irish minister formally advise the King in the exercise of his powers and functions in the Irish Free State, to the exclusion of British ministers. This gave the President of the Executive Council the right to advise the king in his capacity as His Majesty's Irish prime minister.

== History ==
The office of President of the Executive Council came into being on 6 December 1922 with the establishment of the Irish Free State, replacing the previous offices of President of Dáil Éireann and chairman of the Provisional Government. Only two individuals held the office of President of the Executive Council during its existence: W. T. Cosgrave, until 1932, and Éamon de Valera thereafter. Under a constitutional amendment passed in 1936 and legislation passed in 1937 the office of Governor-General was abolished, with most of his powers being transferred to the Executive Council. At the same time, the President of the Executive Council ceased to be formally appointed by the Governor-General, thenceforth simply being elected by the Dáil.

The Irish Free State was reconstituted as 'Ireland' on 29 December 1937, when the present-day Constitution of Ireland came into effect. The new Constitution abolished the office of President of the Executive Council, replacing it with that of Taoiseach, literally meaning "Chieftain" or "Leader", although in Article 13 of the Constitution, the holder of the office is described as "the head of the Government or Prime Minister". The Taoiseach occupies a more powerful position than the President of the Executive Council did and has authority both to dismiss ministers individually and to request a dissolution of the Dáil on his own initiative.

== Officeholders ==
No.	Portrait	Name (birth–death)	Term of office			Political party	Elected
No.	Portrait	Name (birth–death)	Took office	Left office	Time in office	Political party	Elected
1		W. T. Cosgrave (1880–1965)	6 December 1922	9 March 1932	9 years, 94 days	Cumann na nGaedheal	5 terms
2		Éamon de Valera (1882–1975)	9 March 1932	29 December 1937	5 years, 295 days	Fianna Fáil	3 terms
Position replaced by Taoiseach in December 1937

== See also ==
- List of Irish heads of government
