= Provisional Government of Ireland (1922) =

Administrative body of Southern Ireland from January–December 1922

The Provisional Government of Ireland (Irish: Rialtas Sealadach na hÉireann) was the provisional government for the administration of Southern Ireland from 16 January 1922 to 5 December 1922. It was a transitional administration for the period between the ratification of the Anglo-Irish Treaty and the establishment of the Irish Free State. Its legitimacy was disputed by the Anti-Treaty members of Dáil Éireann.

== Legal formation ==
Article 17 of the Anglo-Irish Treaty begins:

By way of provisional arrangement for the administration of Southern Ireland during the interval which must elapse between the date hereof and the constitution of a Parliament and Government of the Irish Free State in accordance therewith, steps shall be taken forthwith for summoning a meeting of members of Parliament elected for constituencies in Southern Ireland since the passing of the Government of Ireland Act, 1920, and for constituting a provisional Government, and the British Government shall take the steps necessary to transfer to such provisional Government the powers and machinery requisite for the discharge of its duties, provided that every member of such provisional Government shall have signified in writing his or her acceptance of this instrument

On 14 January 1922 a meeting of the members elected to the House of Commons of Southern Ireland was held at the Mansion House, Dublin. At the meeting the Anglo-Irish Treaty was ratified by the Irish side in accordance with the Treaty and a Provisional Government was elected for the purposes of Article 17 of the Treaty. Michael Collins was appointed its chairman. The Provisional Government took up office two days later on 16 January 1922 when British administration handed over Dublin Castle to Collins in person. At this time, Westminster had not formally appointed the new Irish ministers or conferred their government with any powers.

These gaps were addressed through the Irish Free State (Agreement) Act 1922 of the British Parliament passed on 31 March 1922. It gave the force of law to the Anglo-Irish Treaty, which was scheduled to the Act. Section 1(2) of the Act provided that for the purposes of giving effect to Article 17 of the Treaty:

- the British Government could by Orders in Council transfer powers to the Provisional Government of Southern Ireland;
- the Parliament of Southern Ireland would be dissolved within four months from the passing of the Act; and
- elections would be held for "the House of the Parliament" to which the Provisional Government would be responsible.

The Act did not give a name to that Parliament but said that in matters within the jurisdiction of the Provisional Government (i.e. only certain matters concerning Southern Ireland), it would have power to make laws in like manner as the Parliament of the Irish Free State when constituted.

By Order in Council under the Act, the British Government formally transferred powers to the Provisional Government on 1 April 1922. The relevant Order in Council signed on 1 April was the "Provisional Government (Transfer of Functions) Order, 1922". This Order passed on the full authority of the state within Southern Ireland to the Provisional Government, including, for the time being, all the laws that applied to Southern Ireland when under British rule. The Ministerial appointments became official and were announced in Iris Oifigiúil No.19 of 4 April 1922.

== Name ==
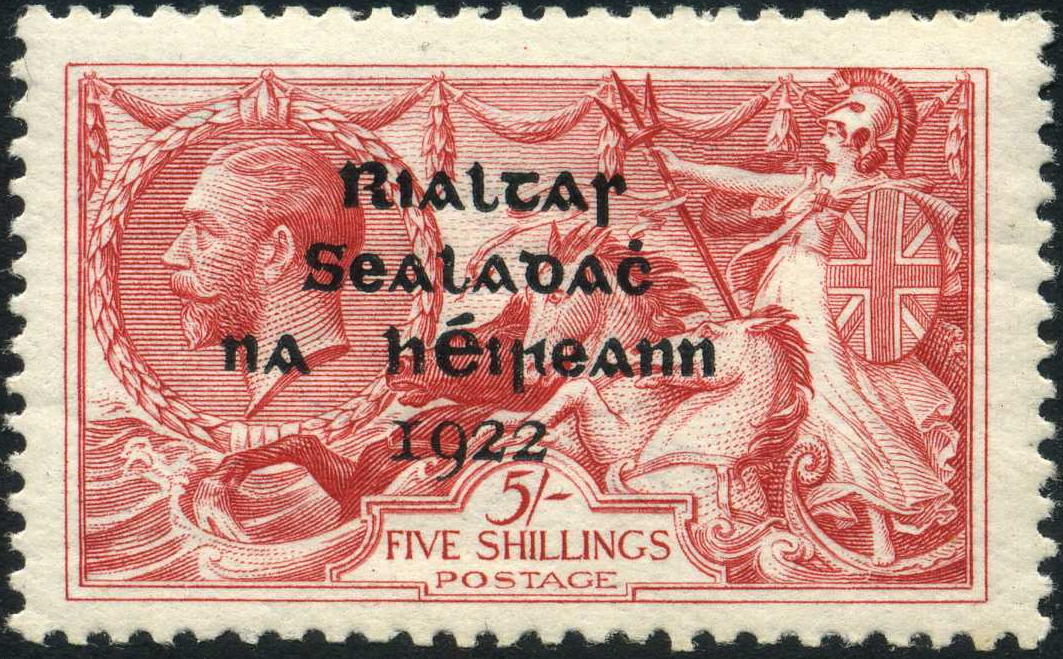
Postage stamps of the government consisted of overprinted British stamps. The text in traditional Irish orthography reads Rialtas Sealadach na hÉireann 1922 and translates as Provisional Government of Ireland 1922

The government is generally referred to simply as "the Provisional Government". It is sometimes referred to as "the Provisional Government of Ireland", or "the Provisional Government of the Irish Free State". In article 17 of the Treaty, under which it was set up, it was referred to merely as "a provisional Government", although Article 15, dealing with discussions between North and South, referred to "the provisional Government of Southern Ireland hereinafter constituted". The Irish Free State (Agreement) Act 1922, which implemented the Treaty in British law, referred to it only as "the Provisional Government established under that Article [Article 17]". Similarly, the Mansion House meeting at which the government was constituted resolved that "a Provisional Government be and is hereby constituted". The Irish Times story on the meeting referred to it as "the Irish Free State Provisional Government", while its editorial of the same date referred to it as "the Provisional Government of Ireland". A committee set up to deal with Irish affairs, headed by Winston Churchill, was called the "Provisional Government of Ireland Committee".

The Provisional Government styled itself Rialtas Sealadach na hÉireann (Provisional Government of Ireland) in Irish. It overprinted its postage stamps accordingly. Rialtas Sealadach na hÉireann also appeared at the head of High Court proceedings, with the approval of the British government (and to the chagrin of Sir Thomas Molony, the Lord Chief Justice of Ireland). Several Acts of the post-1922 Oireachtas of the Irish Free State and the post-1937 Oireachtas refer to the "Provisional Government of Ireland".

== Concurrent Dáil administration ==
Under the Irish Republic's Dáil Constitution adopted in 1919, Dáil Éireann continued to exist after it had ratified the Anglo-Irish Treaty. In protest at the ratification, Éamon de Valera resigned the presidency of the Dáil then sought re-election from among its members (to clarify his mandate), but Arthur Griffith defeated him in the vote and assumed the presidency.

Most of the Dáil Ministers became concurrently Ministers of this Provisional Government. Michael Collins became Chairman of the Provisional Government, while also serving as Minister for Finance in Griffith's Dáil ministry.

The members of the Provisional Government were also members of the Republican Dáil and that parliament held meetings into June. The Dáil had no legitimacy in British law and under its own laws was the parliament to which the Ministry of Dáil Éireann was accountable.

== Handover of Dublin Castle ==
One of the earliest events in the short life of the Provisional Government was the handover of Dublin Castle to the Provisional Government. For centuries Dublin Castle was the symbol, as well as the citadel, of British rule in Ireland. The transfer of the Dublin Castle administration to the representatives of the Irish people was greatly welcomed in Dublin. It was regarded as a significant outward and visible sign that British rule was ending. The handover of Dublin Castle occurred on 16 January 1922. The following is a summary of the account of what happened provided by The Times:

All Dublin was agog with anticipation. From early morning a dense crowd collected outside the gloomy gates in Dame Street, though from the outside little can be seen of the Castle, and only a few privileged persons were permitted to enter its grim gates… [At half past 1] members of the Provisional Government went in a body to the Castle, where they were received by Lord FitzAlan, the Lord Lieutenant. Mr. Michael Collins produced a copy of the Treaty, on which the acceptance of its provisions by himself and his colleagues was endorsed. The existence and authority of the Provisional Government were then formally and officially acknowledged, and they were informed that the British Government would be immediately communicated with in order that the necessary steps might be taken for the transfer to the Provisional Government of the powers and machinery requisite for the discharge of its duties. The Lord Lieutenant congratulated … expressed the earnest hope that under their auspices the ideal of a happy, free, and prosperous Ireland would be attained… The proceedings were held in private, and lasted for 55 minutes, and at the conclusion the heads of the principal administrative departments were presented to the members of the Provisional Government

The following officiaI communique was afterwards issued from the Castle:

In the Council Chamber at Dublin Castle this afternoon His Excellency the Lord Lieutenant received Mr. Michael Collins as the head of the Provisional Government provided for in Article 17 of the Treaty of December 6. Mr. Collins handed to the Lord Lieutenant a copy of the Treaty, on which the acceptance of its provisions by himself and his colleagues had been endorsed and other members of the Provisional Government were then introduced. The Lord Lieutenant congratulated. Mr. Collins and his colleagues and informed them that they were now duly installed as the Provisional Government and that in conformity with Article 17 of the Treaty, he would at once communicate with the British Government, in order that the necessary steps might be taken for the transfer to the Provisional Government of the powers and machinery requisite for the discharge of its duties. He wished them every success in the task that they had undertaken, and expressed the earnest hope that under their auspices the ideal of a happy, free, and prosperous Ireland would be attained.

On leaving the Castle the members of the Provisional Government again received a great ovation from a largely augmented crowd. They returned to the Mansion House from where the Chairman of the Provisional Government, Michael Collins issued the following statement (referring to nothing less than a surrender of the Castle):

The members of the Provisional Government of Ireland received the surrender of Dublin Castle at 1.45 p.m. today. It is now in the hands of the Irish nation. For the next few days the functions of the existing departments of the institution will be continued without in any way prejudicing future action. Members of the Provisional Government proceed to London immediately to meet the British Cabinet Committee to arrange for the various details of handing over. A statement will be issued by the Provisional Government tomorrow in regard to its intentions and policy. – Michael Collins, Chairman

At the end of the day's events, the following telegram was sent from the King to the Lord Lieutenant of Ireland:

Am gratified to hear from your telegram of successful establishment of the Provisional Government in Ireland. Am confident that you will do all in your power to help its members accomplish the task that lies before them. -George R.

== Accountability ==
There was never again "a meeting of members of the Parliament elected for constituencies in Southern Ireland" after 14 January 1922 and neither the Treaty nor the Irish Free State (Agreement) Act 1922 provided that the Provisional Government was or would be accountable to any such body. On 27 May 1922 Lord FitzAlan, the Lord Lieutenant of Ireland, in accordance with the Irish Free State (Agreement) Act 1922 formally dissolved the Parliament of Southern Ireland and by proclamation called "a Parliament to be known as and styled the Provisional Parliament". Under the terms of the Irish Free State (Agreement) Act 1922, the Provisional Government did become accountable to that Provisional Parliament. Therefore, between its formation on 14 January 1922 and 9 September 1922, when the Provisional Parliament or 3rd Dáil first met, the Provisional Government was responsible to no parliament at all.

In November 1922, when refusing a writ of habeas corpus for Erskine Childers and eight other IRA men who had been sentenced to death by a court-martial established by the Provisional Government, the Master of the Rolls in Ireland, Charles O'Connor, considered the existence of a Provisional Government and its authority to act as proposed and execute the nine.

Now we have what is called a Provisional Government in Ireland, and although for the time being it is in a transitional state, it has been formally and legally constituted and derives it validity from the treaty between Great Britain and Ireland and the Act of Parliament confirming that Treaty.

Lord Fitzalan remained in office during the period of the Provisional Government. In the summer of 1922 he frequently held military reviews of departing British soldiers in the Phoenix Park outside the Viceregal Lodge.

== Civil War ==
Anti-treatyites, having opposed the Treaty in the Dáil, mostly withdrew from the assembly and, having formed an opposition "republican government" under Éamon de Valera, began a political campaign from March 1922. At the same time the powerful IRA Army Executive divided, and its anti-Treaty members refused to be bound by the Dáil vote that had ratified it. Barracks that were being evacuated by the British army, in line with the Treaty, were sometimes taken over by anti-Treaty forces. The Dunmanway killings in April emphasised the government's lack of control. In May 1,200 Garda Síochána recruits mutinied. A force led by Rory O'Connor occupied four central buildings in Dublin on 14 April. The Provisional Government ignored this challenge to its authority, hoping that the occupiers would realise that they had achieved nothing, and leave. Instead some incidents at the Four Courts in late June led to the open outbreak of the Irish Civil War on 28 June.

A general election was held on 16 June 1922, held just before the civil war. By mid-1922, Collins in effect laid down his responsibilities as President of the Provisional Government to become Commander-in-Chief of the National Army, a formal structured uniformed army that formed around the pro-Treaty IRA. As part of those duties, he travelled to his native County Cork. On his way home on 22 August 1922, he was killed in an ambush at Béal na mBláth (an Irish language placename that means 'the Mouth of Flowers'). He was 31 years old. The Second Irish Provisional Government took office on 30 August 1922 until the creation of the Irish Free State on 6 December 1922. After Collins' and Griffith's deaths in August 1922, W. T. Cosgrave became both Chairman of the Provisional Government and President of Dáil Éireann, and the distinction between the two posts became irrelevant.

On 6 December 1922, the Irish Free State came into being, and the Provisional Government was succeeded by the Executive Council of the Irish Free State, presided over by a prime minister called the President of the Executive Council.

== Northern Ireland ==
The Provisional Government covertly supplied arms to the IRA in Northern Ireland in an attempt to maintain IRA support elsewhere. This undeclared conflict was formally ended by the "Craig-Collins Agreement" of 30 March 1922, but Collins continued to supply arms until shortly before his death in August 1922. Provisional Government policy changed between trying to persuade the Government of Northern Ireland to join a re-united Ireland and trying to overthrow it. A major concern was the welfare of Catholics in Northern Ireland, who were distrustful of the Ulster Special Constabulary that was formed in late 1921 to deal with the IRA there. Collins's support for the IRA was limited to defensive actions from 2 August. The Government lifted, then re-imposed and then lifted the "Belfast Boycott", designed to end the sale of Northern Irish goods in the south.

On 7 December the House of Commons of Northern Ireland unanimously exercised its right under the Treaty to opt out of the Free State.

== List of ministers ==
- First Provisional Government (January to August 1922)
- Second Provisional Government (August to December 1922)

== See also ==
- Government of Ireland Act 1920
- Provisional Government of the Irish Republic (1916)
