= Executive Council of the Irish Free State =

Cabinet of the Irish Free State from 1922 to 1937

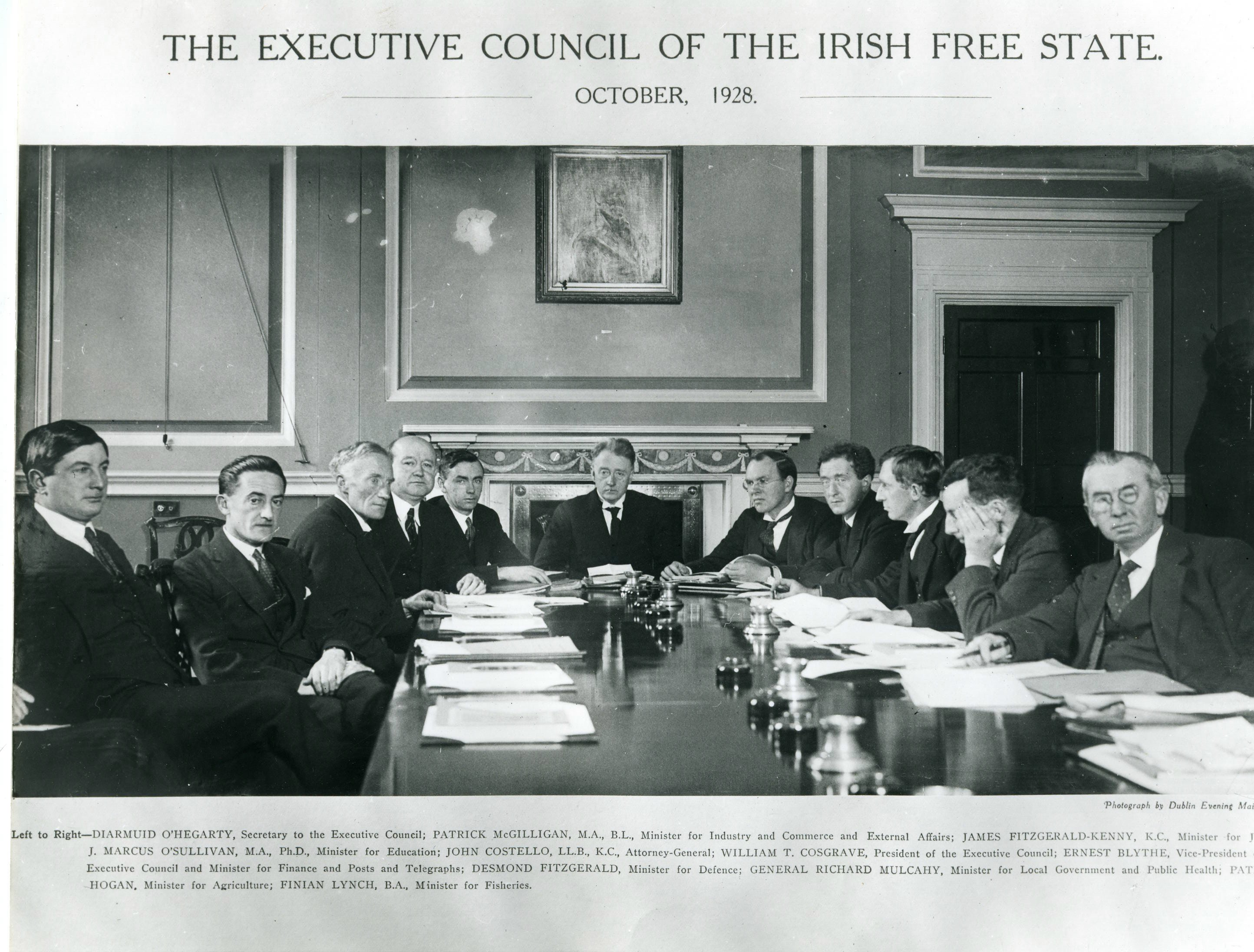
Executive Council of the Irish Free State pictured in 1928.

The Executive Council (Irish: Ard-Chomhairle) was the cabinet and de facto executive branch of government of the 1922–1937 Irish Free State. Formally, executive power was vested in the Governor-General on behalf of the King. In practice, however, it was the Council that governed, since the governor-general was (with few exceptions) bound to act on its advice. The Executive Council included a prime minister called the President of the Executive Council and a deputy prime minister called the vice-president. A member of the council was called an executive minister, as distinct from an extern minister who had charge of a department without being in the council.

The president of the Executive Council was appointed by the governor-general after being nominated by Dáil Éireann, the lower house of the Oireachtas (parliament), and the remaining Executive Ministers were nominated by the president. The Executive Council could also be removed by a vote of no confidence in the Dáil.

For formal and diplomatic purposes, the description "His Majesty's Government in the Irish Free State" was sometimes used.

== Overview ==
The Free State constitution provided that executive authority would be vested in the King and exercised by his Governor-General, who would appoint an Executive Council to "aid and advise" him. However, under Article 51 executive authority could only be exercised "in accordance with the law, practice and constitutional usage governing the exercise of the Executive Authority in the case of the Dominion of Canada". In practice this meant that real authority was vested in the Executive Council, since as in Canada, the governor-general was in most cases required to act on the advice of the Executive Council.

In addition to de facto exercising the executive authority, the Executive Council, by advising the governor-general, had the exclusive right to:

- Convene and dissolve parliament – although this right could not be exercised by a cabinet which had lost the confidence of the Dáil.
- Command of the Defence Forces – although the cabinet could not involve the state in a war without the consent of the Oireachtas.
- Appoint judges.
- Introduce a money bill in the Oireachtas.

Once the president of the Executive Council had been appointed he nominated the vice-president himself. The remaining cabinet ministers were also nominated by the president but had to be approved by a vote of consent in the Dáil. Initially the constitution provided that the Executive Council would consist of between five and seven ministers (not including its president) but under a constitutional amendment adopted in 1927 this maximum limit was increased to twelve. Similarly, initially it was required that all cabinet members hold seats in the Dáil, but an amendment in 1929 provided that one member could be a senator.

If the Executive Council ceased to "retain the support of a majority in Dáil Éireann" the entire cabinet was obliged to resign en masse, however they were permitted to remain in office as acting ministers until the appointment of successors. The fact that an Executive Council that had lost the confidence of the Dáil could not request a dissolution created the possibility of a political stalemate. It meant that if the Executive Council resigned after being defeated, and the Dáil could not agree on a new Council, a Catch-22 situation might be created, in which the inability of the Dáil to choose a cabinet could not be resolved by the holding of a general election. Unlike the equivalent position since 1937 of Taoiseach, the president of the Executive Council did not have authority to advise the governor-general to dismiss ministers. Rather, to dismiss a single member, the whole council had to be dismissed and reformed en bloc. Additionally, the president of the council could not ask the governor-general to dissolve the Dáil on his own initiative, but the council as a whole had to do so. This meant that the position of the president was weaker than that of most modern prime ministers, and he was the council's chairman as much as he was its leader.

== History ==
The Executive Council was established with the coming into force of the Free State constitution in 1922. It replaced two previous cabinets: the Ministry of Dáil Éireann of the Irish Republic established under the Dáil Constitution and the Provisional Government established under the Anglo-Irish Treaty. The Irish Free State had the status of a dominion of the British Commonwealth and the Irish Executive Council derived its name from organs of government found in other dominions. However it differed from the 'executive councils' of other nations. Firstly, it was a cabinet, whereas the Executive Councils of Australia and New Zealand each serve a role closer to that of a privy council. Secondly, whereas in the Free State the president of the Executive Council was the head of government, in Australia it is the Governor-General who is formally its president, although he need not attend all of its meetings. Contrary to the practice in New Zealand and Australia, the executive councils of the provinces of Canada are closer in role to the Free State cabinet, and are presided over by each province's premier.

The office of governor-general was abolished by the Constitution (Amendment No. 27) Act 1936. From 11 December 1936 to 29 December 1937, the remaining months of the Irish Free State, the executive authority and a number of the governor-general's other functions were exercised by the Executive Council directly, but in practice this change was merely symbolic. The Executive Council itself was replaced in 1937 by a new cabinet, called simply the Government, established under the new Constitution of Ireland.

== List of Executive Councils ==
Dáil	Election/Year formed	Council	President	Vice-President	Party
3rd	1922 election	1st Executive Council	W. T. Cosgrave	Kevin O'Higgins	Sinn Féin (Pro-Treaty wing)
4th	1923 election	2nd Executive Council	W. T. Cosgrave	Kevin O'Higgins	Cumann na nGaedheal
5th	1927 (Jun) election	3rd Executive Council	W. T. Cosgrave	Kevin O'Higgins	Cumann na nGaedheal
6th	1927 (Sep) election	4th Executive Council	W. T. Cosgrave	Ernest Blythe	Cumann na nGaedheal
	1930	5th Executive Council	W. T. Cosgrave	Ernest Blythe	Cumann na nGaedheal
7th	1932 election	6th Executive Council	Éamon de Valera	Seán T. O'Kelly	Fianna Fáil
8th	1933 election	7th Executive Council	Éamon de Valera	Seán T. O'Kelly	Fianna Fáil
9th	1937 election	8th Executive Council	Éamon de Valera	Seán T. O'Kelly	Fianna Fáil

== "His Majesty's Government in the Irish Free State" ==
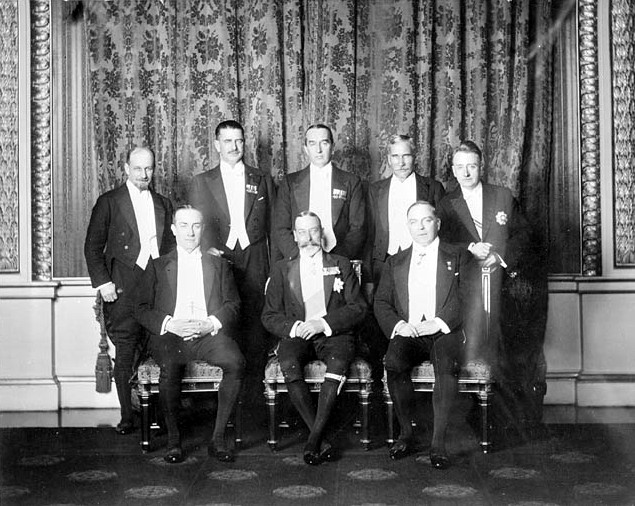
W.T. Cosgrave, first head of the Government in the Irish Free State (standing, far-right), representing the Irish Free State at the 1926 Imperial Conference in London, along with King George V and the Prime Ministers of the United Kingdom, Canada, Newfoundland, Australia, New Zealand and South Africa.

The Irish Free State was a constitutional monarchy, initially one of the dominions within the British Empire (later the Commonwealth of Nations), whose monarch had the same title in all parts of the Empire and its territories, and the Free State government was sometimes officially referred to as 'His Majesty's Government in the Irish Free State'.

After the 1926 Imperial Conference, attended by Cosgrave as President of the Executive Council of the Irish Free State, the King's title was changed under the Royal and Parliamentary Titles Act 1927. The altered title, as proclaimed in London, replaced the words "...of the United Kingdom of Great Britain and Ireland and..." with "...of Great Britain, Ireland and...". This change did not stop the Irish government using the description "His Majesty's Government in the Irish Free State" in agreements between the monarch's governments in the United Kingdom and in the Irish Free State, as in:

- Agreement between His Majesty's Government in the United Kingdom of Great Britain and Northern Ireland and His Majesty's Government in the Irish Free State as to the Registration and Control of Veterinary Surgeons (1931).
- Agreement interpreting and supplementing Article ten of the Articles of Agreement for a Treaty between Great Britain and Ireland to which the force of law was given by the Irish Free State (Agreement) Act, 1922 and by the Constitution of the Irish Free State (Saorstát Éireann) Act, 1922 (1929).

The description was also in regular official use between 1929 and 1934 in Notes published by HMSO, "in Regard to Commercial Relations" formally exchanged "Between His Majesty's Government in the Irish Free State" and foreign governments including the governments of:

- Brazil, 1931
- Costa Rica, 1934
- Guatemala, 1930
- Roumania, 1930
- Salvador, 1931,

and in other such Notes, including:

- Exchange of Notes Between His Majesty's Government in the Irish Free State and the Italian Government Concerning Reciprocal Recognition of Passenger Ships' Certificates and Emigrant Ship Regulations, 1930
- Exchange of Notes Between His Majesty's Government in the Irish Free State and the Egyptian Government Prolonging the Commercial "Modus Vivendi" of 25/28 July 1930.

In a debate in the Dáil in December 1932, when de Valera was president, on a government motion to approve a trade agreement negotiated at the Ottawa Conference in August between the Irish Free State and the Dominion of Canada, it was remarked that the vice-president (Ernest Blythe) had signed the agreement "on behalf of His Majesty's Government in the Irish Free State." But the description went out of use at least by 1937, when the Constitution of Ireland came into effect as a result of de Valera's process of constitutional autochthony. Any remaining vestige of the monarch's part in the constitution, or doubt about the person or office of the head of state, was removed when the state was finally declared to be a republic, as from 18 April 1949, under the Republic of Ireland Act 1948.

== See also ==
- Executive Council (Commonwealth countries)
- Irish cabinets since 1919
- History of the Republic of Ireland
