= Chairman of the Provisional Government of the Irish Free State =

Irish transitional post

- Type: Head of Government
- Formation: January 1922
- First holder: Michael Collins
- Final holder: W. T. Cosgrave
- Abolished: 6 December 1922
- Succession: President of the Executive Council of the Irish Free State

The Chairman of the Provisional Government of the Irish Free State, also referred to as the Chairman of the Provisional Government of Ireland (Irish: Cathaoirleach an Rialtais Shealadaigh na hÉireann), was a transitional post established in January 1922, lasting until the creation of the Irish Free State in December 1922.

The Anglo-Irish Treaty of December 1921 was passed by the Irish Republic's Dáil Éireann. The British government also required it to be passed by the House of Commons of Southern Ireland, and for a legal government to be established. Michael Collins became Chairman of the Provisional Government (i.e. prime minister). He also remained Minister for Finance of Arthur Griffith's republican administration.

After Collins and Griffith's deaths in August 1922, W. T. Cosgrave became both Chairman of the Provisional Government and President of Dáil Éireann, and the distinction between the two became increasingly confused and irrelevant until the creation of the Irish Free State in December 1922.

== Office holders ==
No.	Name	Picture	Term of office		Party
1	Michael Collins		16 January 1922	22 August 1922	Sinn Féin (Pro-Treaty faction)
2	W. T. Cosgrave		22 August 1922	6 December 1922	Sinn Féin (Pro-Treaty faction)
Position replaced by President of the Executive Council of the Irish Free State in December 1922

== See also ==
- List of Irish heads of government
- Provisional Government of the Irish Free State
