= ESRI =

ESRI may refer to:

- Economic and Social Research Institute (ESRI), an Irish economic research institute
- Esri, a GIS software company (Environmental Systems Research Institute)
