= Kathleen Napoli McKenna =

Irish republican activist and journalist

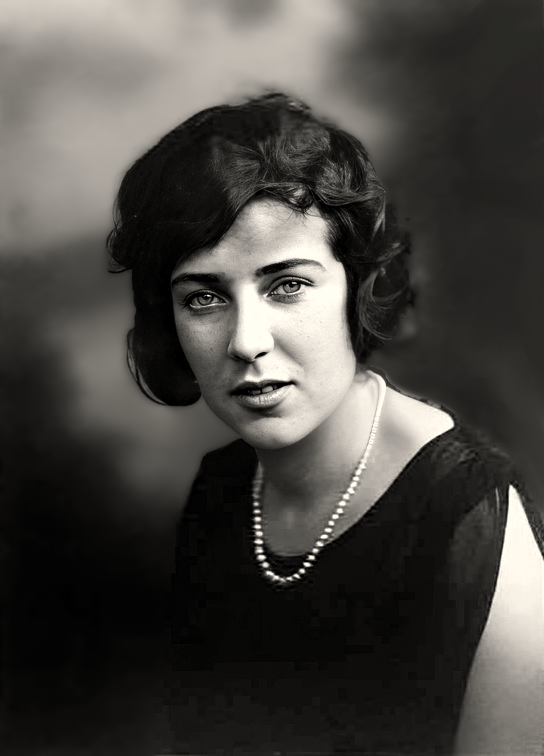
- Born: Kathleen Maria Kenna; 9 September 1897; Oldcastle, County Meath
- Died: 22 March 1988 (aged 90); Rome, Italy
- Occupations: Secretary; Journalist
- Known for: Arthur Griffith's private secretary during the 1921 Anglo-Irish Treaty negotiations

Kathleen Napoli McKenna (9 September 1897 – 22 March 1988) was an Irish nationalist activist and journalist closely associated with Arthur Griffith.

== Early life and family ==
Kathleen Napoli McKenna was born Kathleen Maria Kenna on 9 September 1897 in Oldcastle, County Meath. Her parents were William (1862–1939), a draper and hardware merchant, and Mary Kenna (née Hanley). She was the eldest child of seven, with 3 sisters and 3 brothers. She and her siblings added "Mc" to their names as teenagers. Her maternal grandfather was a strong influence on McKenna, he was a Fenian, miller and land agitator. Agnes O'Farrelly was her paternal great aunt. McKenna attended the Oldcastle Endowed School and went on to pass the National University of Ireland matriculation exam. She attended University College Dublin briefly, but the family's circumstances meant she could not complete her course.

Her father had been an active member of the Land League and the Meath Labour Union. He was one of the organisers of a short-lived local newspaper, Sinn Féin – Oldcastle Monthly Review, in 1902. Both her parents were in the Gaelic League. Arthur Griffith and Brian O'Higgins frequently visited the family home. Denounced by the local parish priest, Fr Robert Barry, her father's business went into decline. The family left Oldcastle in August 1915, to move to Dundalk, and later in March 1916 to Rugby, Warwickshire. In Rugby, her father taught typing and shorthand, and her mother worked in an ammunition factory. McKenna worked as a secretary for an engineering firm. Members of the family returned to Ireland from 1919 to 1922, and by the time of her father's death, he was living back in Oldcastle.

== Career ==
McKenna would holiday in Ireland, and during a visit to Dublin in the summer of 1919, she presented herself to the Sinn Féin offices in Harcourt Street. She had a letter of introduction from her father to Griffith, which emphasised her willingness to work for Irish independence. For her holidays, she worked in the Sinn Féin press bureau and was employed as one of the first "dáil girls" of the clandestine government. She was informed that if a planned news bulletin came through, she would be summoned back to Dublin. In October 1919, she received the summons, and after a typing test on 11 November, she joined the Irish Bulletin under minister for propaganda, Desmond FitzGerald, and director of publicity, Robert Brennan. She also became a member of the Gaelic League Parnell branch.

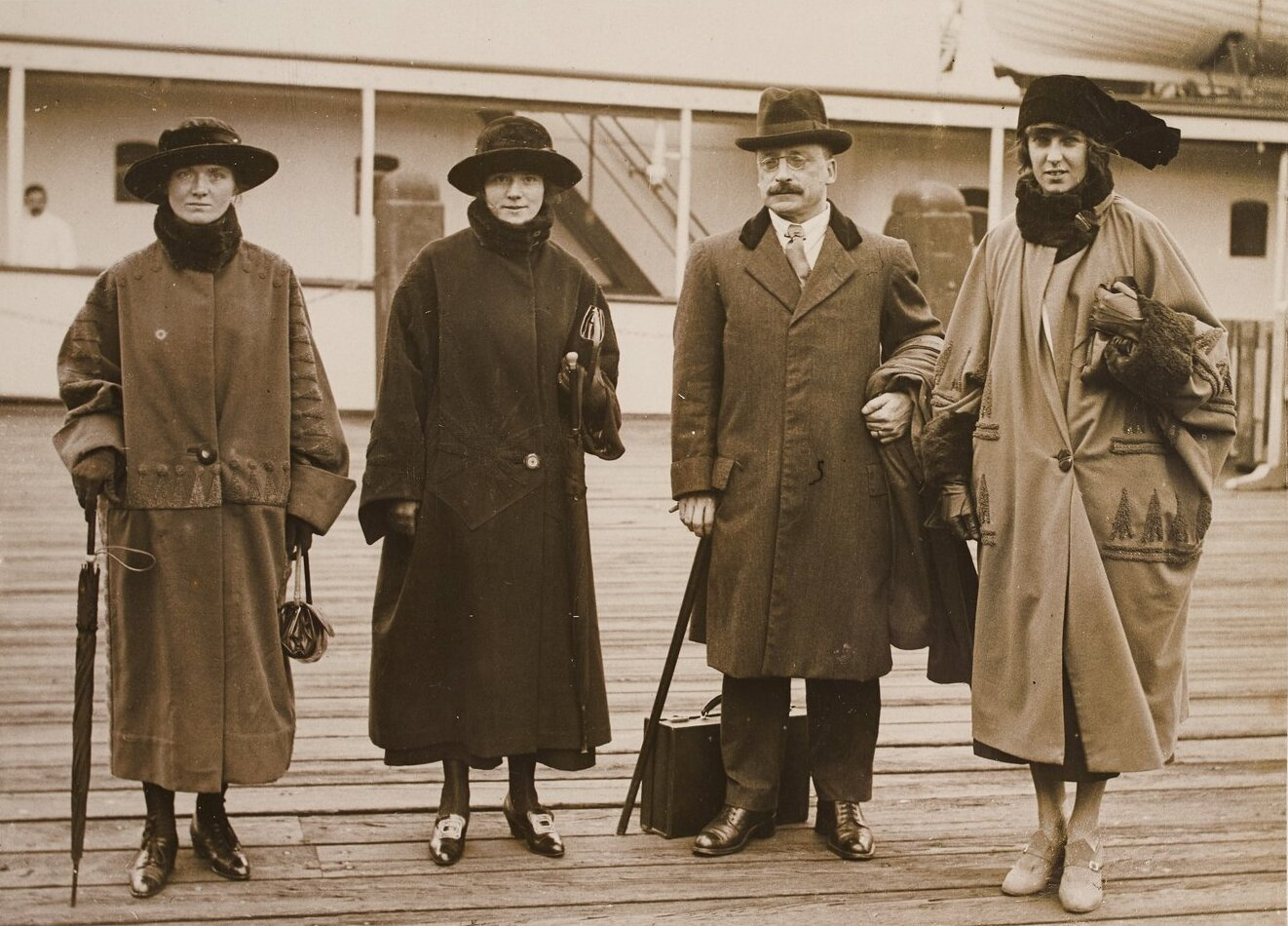
Part of the Irish delegation to the Anglo-Irish Treaty negotiations in London: Ellie Lyons, Alice Lyons, Arthur Griffith and Kathleen McKenna in 1921

The Irish Bulletin was published 5 times a week, circulating the misdeeds of the British government in Ireland. McKenna would edit and mimeograph a summary of "acts of aggression" from British forces in Ireland weekly, compiled by Anna Kelly. Frank Gallagher did most of the writing, edited by FitzGerald, and later Erskine Childers. Though McKenna is sometimes described as the Bulletin's editor, she was more akin to an editorial assistant. R.M. Smyllie later recalled that she was in regular contact with the media. She would type out each issue on a wax stencil in a typewriter, which was then used to create mimeograph copies, and then circulated to England. In the beginning, about 30 recipients, mostly London journalists, received the Bulletin but by October 1920 it had grow to 600, and by July 1921 over 1200. She also kept the accounts, took dictation of statements, and at times worked up articles from notes given to her by Griffith or others. She also acted as a confidential messenger, couriering between dáil departments and IRA leaders such as Michael Collins. Through this, she met Moya Llewelyn Davies.

The Bulletin became a symbol of the underground government, and a target for British forces. This necessitated the frequent moving of the operation from one Dublin hideout to another. She feared that if she were captured, she would break under interrogation. When FitzGerald was arrested, he had been asked about "the girl wearing a green tam" in reference to McKenna's tam-o'-shanter hat which prompted her to change her choice of hat. Despite the capture of a number of the Bulletin staff, as well as the capture of the office files and equipment on 26 March 1921, it never missed an issue.

McKenna's sister Winifred also worked as a secretary to the clandestine government. Her brother, Tadhg (Timothy) (1899–1931), was a member of Sinn Féin and in Greenore, County Louth was involved in trade union affairs. He was detained, beaten, and interned in March 1921. He was later an activist with the Irish Labour Party. Her brother William was a messenger for the Irish government during this period, and during the Civil War served in the Free State Army.

After the truce in 1921, McKenna was assigned to the dáil cabinet secretarial staff at the Mansion House, where she continued to work in the publicity department. She travelled as Griffith's private secretary to London as part of the Irish delegation to the treaty negotiations in October 1921. She was an admirer of both Griffith and Collins, and was a firm supporter of the Anglo-Irish treaty. She worked as Griffith's secretary until just before his death and also did some secretarial work for Collins during the negotiations. One of her sisters was anti-treaty, and she later recalled that she lost friends due to her support of the treaty.

When the Irish Free State government was established, McKenna became a private secretary to a number of ministers for external affairs, including FitzGerald, Kevin O'Higgins and W. T. Cosgrave. In 1924, she was a private secretary to the boundary commission, as well as one of a pair of secretaries who travelled with the Irish delegation to the London imperial conference in 1924. From 1927 to 1931 she was James Dolan's secretary and parliamentary secretary to the minister for industry and commerce. Before its closure in 1924, she wrote a number of articles for the Freeman's Journal.

== Life in Italy ==
McKenna married Vittorio Napoli in 1931. He was a captain, and later a general, in the Italian royal grenadier guards. They met when she was on holiday in Italy in 1927. For the first 5 years of their marriage, they lived in the port of Derna in Cyrenaica, Libya, while her husband was stationed there. A son and daughter were born there. From September 1939 to June 1940, the family lived in Albania, but after Italy entered World War II, McKenna and the children moved to Viterbo. Her husband was taken prisoner in Greece, where he was serving, in September 1943, and was detained in Germany and Poland. He returned to Italy in September 1945. Viterbo had been heavily bombed, and after Allied troops arrived, McKenna worked as a translator and gave English lessons to support her family. Her husband remained in the army, and they remained in Viterbo until 1956, later moving to Rome.

After the war, McKenna wrote articles for the Irish Independent and other publications from Ireland, the United States, and New Zealand including The Irish Press, Irish Travel, Standard, Word, and Writer's Digest. Sometimes she wrote under her own name, as well as her pen name Kayn or Kayen MacKay. As the wives of Italian officers did not traditionally work, the money she earned from this was kept for travel and other leisure activities. This money allowed her to visit Ireland in 1947 for the first time since 1932, to visit her family. After their retirement, McKenna and her husband would visit Ireland regularly, and travelled around Italy.

== Later life and death ==
McKenna applied for an Irish military pension in 1950–51 and 1970, receiving references in support of her claim from Gallagher. As she had not served in a military organisation, her claims were rejected. As a War of Independence veteran, she was awarded free travel in 1972, which was later extended to her husband. In her later year, McKenna became concerned about the inaccuracies in the history around the War of Independence and the Civil War. She gave two talks to Radio Éireann in 1951, speaking about her time with the Irish Bulletin. Copies of these recordings are now held by the Bureau of Military History. During her lifetime, extracts of her memoir were published in the Capuchin Annual and The Irish Times. She had drafted and redrafted these memoirs from the late 1940s to the early 1980s. A version edited by her daughter and niece was published in 2014 as A dáil girl's revolutionary recollections. McKenna died on 22 March 1988 in Rome. She was buried with an Irish flag which she had kept with her. A large collection of her papers is held in the National Library of Ireland. In 2010, 2011 and 2016, some of her memorabilia was sold in Dublin.
