= Peter Lunn (cricketer) =

English cricketer

Personal information
- Full name: Peter Daniel Lunn
- Born: 16 April 1970 (age 56); Oxford, Oxfordshire, England
- Batting: Right-handed
- Bowling: Leg break

Domestic team information
- Years: Team
- 1989–1990: Oxford University

Career statistics
Competition	First-class
Matches	16
Runs scored	431
Batting average	26.93
100s/50s	–/1
Top score	61
Balls bowled	582
Wickets	3
Bowling average	127.66
5 wickets in innings	–
10 wickets in match	–
Best bowling	1/34
Catches/stumpings	2/–
- Source: Cricinfo, 26 June 2020

Peter Daniel Lunn (born 16 April 1970) is a behavioural economist, former journalist and English former first-class cricketer.

== Early life and education ==
Lunn was born at Oxford in April 1970. He later studied at New College at the University of Oxford.

== First-class cricket career ==
He played first-class cricket for Oxford University while studying there, making his debut against Northamptonshire at Oxford in 1989. He played first-class cricket for Oxford until 1990, making sixteen appearances. Lunn scored 431 runs in his sixteen matches, at an average of 26.93 and a high score of 61, which was his only half century. As a leg break bowler, he bowled 97 overs taking a total of 3 wickets.

== Journalism ==
Lunn was an assistant editor of the BBC Newsnight programme, before becoming editor of the Dublin radio station Newstalk from its launch in April 2002 until August 2003.

== Economics ==
Pete Lunn is the founder and head of the Irish Economic and Social Research Institute’s Behavioural Research Unit (BRU). He is the author of Basic Instincts: Human Nature and the New Economics (Marshall Cavendish, 2008)
