= Irish Bulletin =

The Irish Bulletin was the official gazette of the government of the Irish Republic. It was produced by the Department of Propaganda during the Irish War of Independence. and its offices were originally located at No. 6 Harcourt Street, Dublin. The paper's first editor was Desmond FitzGerald, until his arrest and replacement by Erskine Childers. The Bulletin appeared in weekly editions from 11 November 1919 until the time of ratification of the Anglo-Irish Treaty in 1922.

== Genesis ==
In April 1919, Terence MacSwiney proposed the establishment of a daily paper by the Dáil for the purpose of publicity. His suggestion was not implemented until November, when "Desmond Fitzgerald decided that some form of printed counter-propaganda was vital to republican aims and to take advantage of the success of Sinn Féin and the increasing international interest in Ireland". Fitzgerald succeeded Laurence Ginnell in the Ministry following the latter's arrest in April 1919, though he did not take up the position until July. At a Cabinet meeting held on 7 November, there was agreement that there should be "A scheme for daily news bulletin to foreign correspondents, weekly lists of atrocities; entertainment of friendly journalists approved, and £500 voted for expenses under Mr. Griffith's personal supervision." Four days later the Irish Bulletin made its début, in a run consisting of just thirty copies. Five issues of the bulletin were issued each week for the next two years, despite efforts by the British authorities to suppress it.

== Personnel and contributors ==
In the early days, the paper was produced mainly by Frank Gallagher and Robert Brennan. Brennan, as Sinn Féin's Director of Publicity since April 1918, had played a leading role in that party's success in the 1918 General Election.

Following Fitzgerald's arrest in 1921, Erskine Childers was appointed Director of Propaganda taking charge of publicity and thus becoming the paper's new editor. On 9 May 1921, both Childers and Gallagher were arrested and taken to Dublin Castle. Following the intervention of 'Andy' Cope, both were released that night and 'went on the run'. The hasty release of the two led to speculation between Art O'Brien and Michael Collins that there was a rift developing between the British military authorities and the civil administration. Despite the arrests, the Bulletin "continued to appear on schedule". Alan J. Ellis, a journalist with the Cork Examiner made occasional contributions to the paper. Kathleen Napoli McKenna was 'a key force behind the daily news-sheet.

== Content ==
In the early days, the Bulletin consisted mainly of lists of raids by the security forces and the arrests of suspects. In order to stimulate interest, this was expanded in 1921 at the behest of the Irish President in his direction to Childers to give more detailed accounts of events. Extracts from foreign publications, particularly sympathetic English papers, were frequently included. A regular feature was accounts from the Dáil Courts, which were reported in detail. The Bulletin was more graphic in its coverage of violence than was usual for its time. An example was its reporting on the deaths of two prominent Sinn Féin leaders, Henry and Patrick Loughnane, from Shanaglish, Gort, County Galway. The men had been handed over by the Royal Irish Constabulary to local members of the Auxiliary Division.

On Dec 6th, the bodies were found in a pond. The skulls were battered in and the flesh was hanging loose on both bodies.The two men were evidently tied by the neck to a motor lorry and dragged after it until they were dead. Before the bodies were hidden in a pond an effort was made to burn them.

== Counterfeit edition ==
On the night of 26–27 March 1921, the offices of the Irish Bulletin were discovered by the British authorities. Captured typewriters and duplicators were used to fabricate bogus issues of the paper. These were distributed to the usual subscribers using lists found at the office. Lord Henry Cavendish-Bentinck MP on receiving some of the counterfeit papers through the post, asked in the House that those responsible 'not (to) waste their money in sending me any more of their forgeries.' The initial efforts of the forgers, Captains Hugh Pollard and William Darling were of poor quality and easily identified as counterfeit.

== See also ==
- Iris Oifigiúil
- The Dublin Gazette

== Sources ==
- The Origin and Organisation of British Propaganda in Ireland in 1920, Brian P Murphy, Aubane Historical Society and Spinwatch (2006), ISBN 1-903497-24-8
- The Paper Wall: Newspapers and Propaganda in Ireland 1919-1921, Ian Kenneally, The Collins Press (Cork 2008), ISBN 978-1-905172-58-0
- The four glorious years, Frank Gallagher, Irish Press, (1953) reprinted Blackwater Press, (2005) ISBN 978-1-84131-784-7
