= Moyne Institute =

Medical research facility, Trinity College Dublin

Moyne Institute of Preventive Medicine
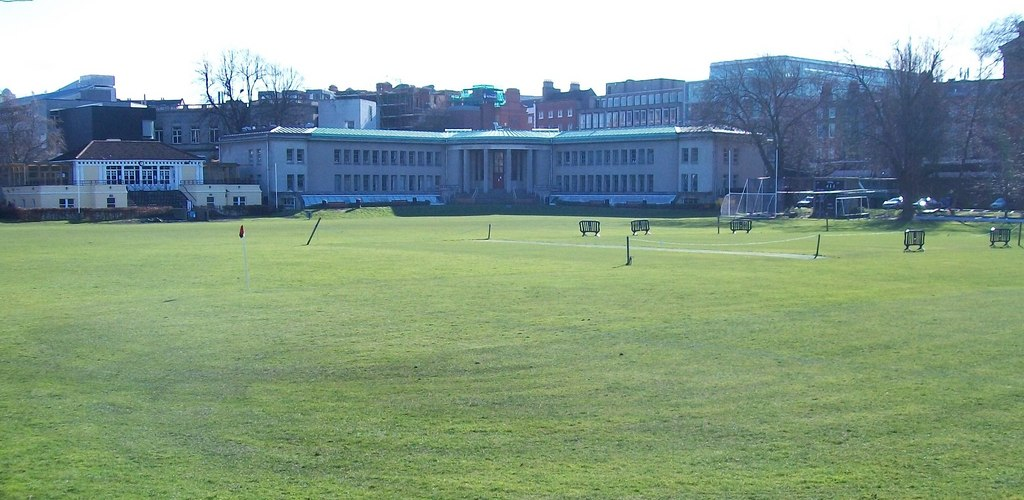
- Looking across College Park to the Moyne Institute. The Pavilion is to the left.
- Interactive map of the Moyne Institute of Preventive Medicine area
- Alternative names: Moyne Institute

General information
- Location: Dublin
- Coordinates: 53.34223°N 6.25311°W
- Groundbreaking: 1950
- Opened: 1953
- Renovated: 1963,1981,2012

Design and construction
- Architect: Desmond FitzGerald

The Moyne Institute of Preventive Medicine is a medical research institute within Trinity College Dublin.

The institute's building, at the Nassau Street and Lincoln Place end of the TCD campus, was designed by Desmond FitzGerald. The construction was funded by Grania Guinness in memory of her father, Walter Guinness. The foundation stone was laid in 1950 and the building was opened in 1953.

== Building ==
The building has a copper roof and the floor inside the main entrance is made of white Sicilian marble as are the staircases. There is a time capsule in the building, containing malting barley, freeze-dried bacteria and a vial of penicillin.

=== Modifications to building ===
In 1963 a two-floor extension was added to the south wing for the Department of Social Medicine, which later moved to St. James's Hospital in 1973. A Similar extension was added to the north wing in 1981 and the laboratories were renovated in 2012.
