= Mabel McConnell Fitzgerald =

Irish Republican, socialist and suffragette

- Born: Mabel Washington McConnell; 4 July 1884; Belfast, Ireland
- Died: 24 April 1958 (aged 73); Blackrock, Dublin, Ireland
- Education: Victoria College; Queen's University Belfast
- Spouse: Desmond FitzGerald
- Children: 4, including Garret

Mabel Washington Fitzgerald (4 July 1884 – 24 April 1958) was an Irish republican, suffragette, and socialist. She took part in the 1916 Easter Rising and the Irish War of Independence. She was the mother of Taoiseach Garret FitzGerald and wife of Desmond FitzGerald.

== Background ==
Born Mabel Washington McConnell on 4 July 1884, she was the daughter of John McConnell, a whiskey salesman from Belfast, and his wife Margaret Neill. She was the granddaughter of a Presbyterian farmer near the city. McConnell received her early education at Victoria College in Belfast, and went on to earn a Bachelor of Arts from Queen's University Belfast in 1906. At Queen's, she developed her positions on republicanism, women's rights and her socialist politics along with her sister Eilis. She had a strong interest in the Irish language. She was a member of the Women's Social and Political Union, Sinn Féin and the Gaelic League.

After graduating, McConnell was secretary to the President of Queen's University before moving to London in 1908 to complete a postgraduate teaching certificate in Saint Mary's Training College, Paddington. She worked for a time as a school teacher in Ilford. In 1909, she was a secretary to George Bernard Shaw for several months while his permanent secretary, Judy Gilmore, was ill. She continued to remain friends with Shaw and his wife, maintaining a correspondence for a number of years.

== Family ==
McConnell met her husband Desmond FitzGerald in London in 1910 at a language seminar run by the Gaelic League, of which she was a committee member. She was the more passionate radical, but to see her, FitzGerald attended political meetings and soon became as active. In March 1911 she did secretarial work for George Moore. In later years FitzGerald wrote to Shaw to urge him to support Irish separatism.

She and FitzGerald eloped in 1911 when she discovered she was pregnant; they lived in France until moving to Dingle, County Kerry in March 1913. They were later expelled from Kerry by the British as they were suspected of signalling the Germans. The couple then moved to Bray. They had four children: Desmond (1911–1987), Pierce (1914–1986), Fergus (1920–1983) and Garret (1926–2011). Her son Garret followed his father into Irish politics, becoming Taoiseach twice.

== Easter Rising and War of Independence ==
McConnell Fitzgerald was in the General Post Office, the rebellion headquarters during the 1916 Rising. However, after the first days of the Rising, Pearse objected to having both parents of small children taking part and told McConnell Fitzgerald to go home.

She was the organiser of her husband's election campaign in 1918 with the phrase "Put Him In To Get Him Out", since at the time he was in fact in gaol in Gloucester as a result of his nationalist activities. He was duly elected and joined the Irish Dáil, refusing to take up his seat in Westminster.

== Civil War and after ==
McConnell Fitzgerald had been on the executive council of Cumann na mBan from 1918 until 1921, when she resigned. McConnell Fitzgerald was not in favour of the Treaty; however, her husband was on the Pro-Treaty side. Her letters, such as those with hunger-striker Ernie O'Malley, suggest that while her husband was Minister for External Affairs in the government during the Irish Civil War, she remained opposed to the Treaty. Later she came to agree more with her husband's point of view, especially after the assassination of Kevin O'Higgins. She converted to Catholicism in 1943. She also became more conservative as she got older, less impressed with the results of universal suffrage.

She also taught in the school started and run by Louise Gavan Duffy. While she retired from political life to raise her family, her husband went on to be Minister for Defence and a Senator.
