= John D. FitzGerald =

Irish economist (born 1949)

- Born: John Desmond FitzGerald; 27 October 1949 (age 76); Rathmines, Dublin, Ireland
- Education: University College Dublin
- Occupation: Economist
- Spouse: Eithne FitzGerald (m. 1972)
- Children: 3
- Parents: Garret FitzGerald; Joan O'Farrell

John Desmond FitzGerald (born 27 October 1949) is the former head of the macroeconomics and resource economics division and former coordinator of the research programme of macroeconomics of the Economic and Social Research Institute (ESRI) in Dublin, Ireland. He joined the ESRI in 1984, after 12 years at the Department of Finance. He holds master's degrees in history and economics from University College Dublin.

He is a former member of the Independent Expert Panel Commission established by the Department of Communications Energy and Natural Resources in 2016. He was also a member of the Commission of the Central Bank of Ireland. FitzGerald was a member of the National Economic and Social Council, the EU Group for Economic Analysis, the Northern Ireland Authority for Energy Regulation, and the Renewable Energy Strategy Group. He was president of the Irish Economic Association and president of the EuroFRAME group of economic forecasters.

FitzGerald has made contributions to economic policy in Ireland, ranging from investment priorities and structural funds, to energy policy and membership of the Economic and Monetary Union. He was the lead author of the influential ESRI Medium-Term Review (up until his retirement from the ESRI in 2014), which provides 7-year forecasts for economic development in Ireland and is published every 3–4 years.

Fitzgerald expressed regret over not fully anticipating the effects of the Irish credit bubble during his time at the ESRI. The ESRI May 2008 Medium-Term Review (No. 11) forecast a softer outcome for Ireland's deflating credit bubble. Fitzgerald's earlier ESRI December 2005 Medium-Term Review (No. 10) had forewarned that the strength of Ireland's growth, in the light of growing global imbalances, was a material risk factor. The ESRI had begun to use the term "property bubble" (and referred to the OECD research on Ireland's property market) in April 2006.

Fitzgerald is also a prolific financial writer and columnist in the Irish financial media on various economic and social issues.

His father is former Irish Taoiseach Garret FitzGerald, his grandfather is former Irish Minister Desmond FitzGerald, and he is married to former Irish Minister Eithne FitzGerald.

His brother is Mark Fitzgerald, co-founder and former CEO of Ireland's largest residential estate agency, Sherry Fitzgerald Group & Cushman & Wakefield Ireland (Formerly DTZ Sherry FitzGerald).

== See also ==
- Economic and Social Research Institute
