= Garret FitzGerald =

Taoiseach (1981–1982, 1982–1987)

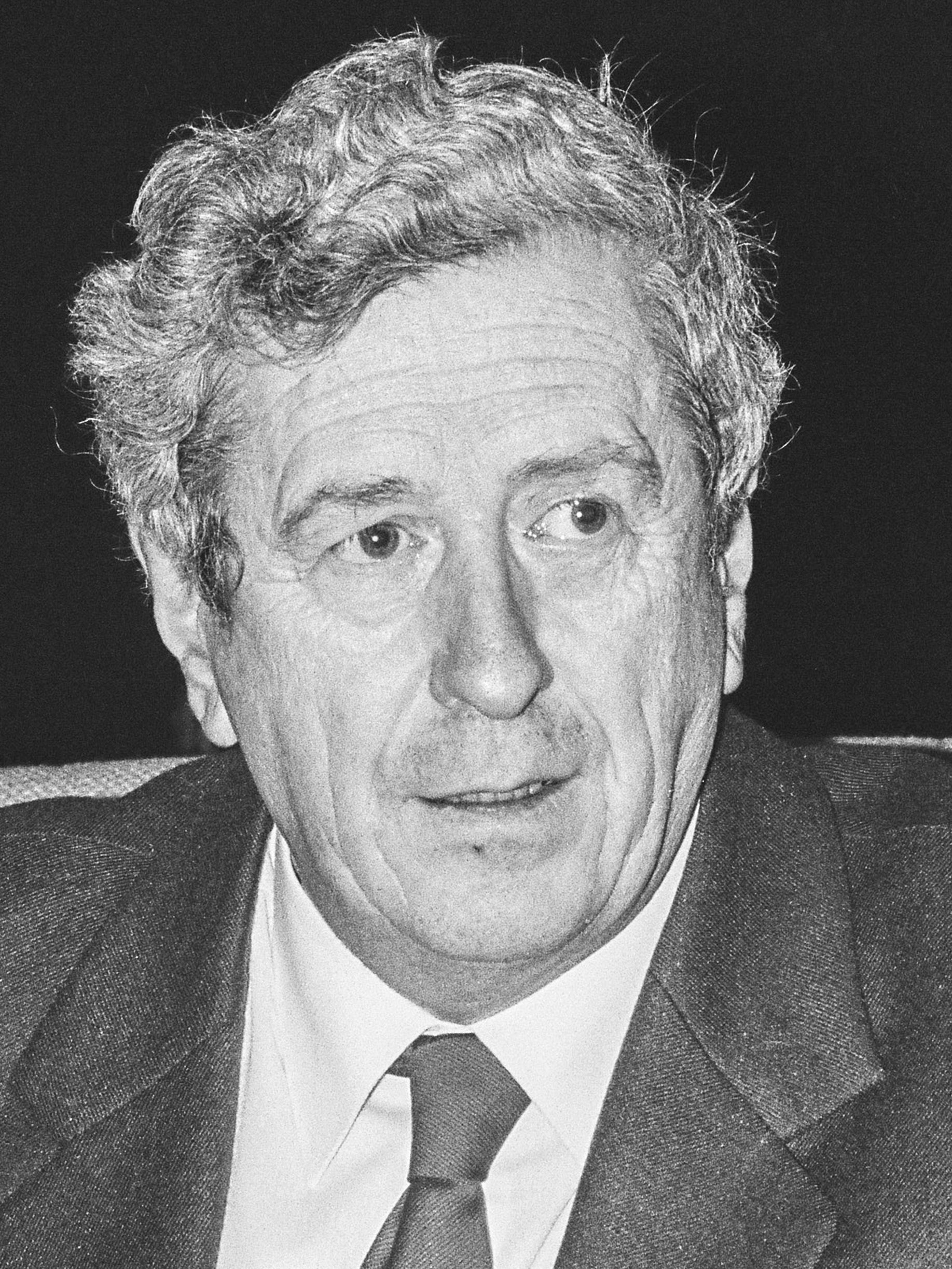
- FitzGerald in 1984

Taoiseach
- In office 14 December 1982 – 10 March 1987
- President: Patrick Hillery
- Tánaiste: Dick Spring; Peter Barry
- Preceded by: Charles Haughey
- Succeeded by: Charles Haughey
- In office 30 June 1981 – 9 March 1982
- President: Patrick Hillery
- Tánaiste: Michael O'Leary
- Preceded by: Charles Haughey
- Succeeded by: Charles Haughey

Leader of the Opposition
- In office 10 March 1982 – 14 December 1982
- Taoiseach: Charles Haughey
- Preceded by: Charles Haughey
- Succeeded by: Charles Haughey
- In office 5 July 1977 – 30 June 1981
- Taoiseach: Jack Lynch; Charles Haughey
- Preceded by: Jack Lynch
- Succeeded by: Charles Haughey

Leader of Fine Gael
- In office 1 July 1977 – 10 March 1987
- Deputy: Peter Barry
- Preceded by: Liam Cosgrave
- Succeeded by: Alan Dukes

Minister for Foreign Affairs
- In office 14 March 1973 – 5 July 1977
- Taoiseach: Liam Cosgrave
- Preceded by: Brian Lenihan
- Succeeded by: Michael O'Kennedy

Teachta Dála
- In office June 1969 – November 1992
- Constituency: Dublin South-East

Senator
- In office 23 June 1965 – 18 June 1969
- Constituency: Industrial and Commercial Panel

Personal details
- Born: 9 February 1926 Ballsbridge, Dublin, Ireland
- Died: 19 May 2011 (aged 85) Phibsborough, Dublin, Ireland
- Resting place: Shanganagh Cemetery, Shankill, Dublin
- Party: Fine Gael
- Spouse: Joan O'Farrell (m. 1947; died 1999)
- Relations: Eithne FitzGerald (daughter-in-law)
- Children: 3, including John
- Parents: Desmond FitzGerald (father); Mabel McConnell (mother)
- Education: University College Dublin; King's Inns
- Nickname: "Garret the Good"

Garret Desmond FitzGerald (9 February 1926 – 19 May 2011) was an Irish Fine Gael politician, economist, and barrister who served twice as Taoiseach, serving from 1981 to 1982 and 1982 to 1987. He served as Leader of Fine Gael from 1977 to 1987 and was twice Leader of the Opposition between 1977 and 1982; he was previously Minister for Foreign Affairs from 1973 to 1977. FitzGerald served as a Teachta Dála (TD) from 1969 to 1992 and was a Senator for the Industrial and Commercial Panel from 1965 to 1969.

He was the son of Desmond FitzGerald, the first foreign minister of the Irish Free State. At the time of his death, FitzGerald was president of the Institute of International and European Affairs and a columnist for The Irish Times, and had made occasional appearances on television programmes.

== Early life ==
Garret FitzGerald was born in Ballsbridge, Dublin, in 1926, son of Desmond FitzGerald and Mabel McConnell. His mother was involved in politics; it was through her that his father also became political. He had three elder brothers, Desmond (1911–1987), Pierce (1914–1986), and Fergus (1920–1983). His father was born and raised in London and was the Minister for External Affairs at the time of his son's birth. He was the son of a labourer who had emigrated from Skeheenarinky in County Tipperary, joined the Irish Volunteers in 1914, and fought during the 1916 Easter Rising. FitzGerald senior had been active in Sinn Féin during the Irish War of Independence and had been one of the founders of Cumann na nGaedheal. The party was formed to support the Anglo-Irish Treaty of 1921, which created the Irish Free State.

Although a senior figure on the pro-treaty side of Ireland's political divide, FitzGerald senior had remained friendly with anti-Treaty republicans, such as Belfast man Seán MacEntee, a minister in Éamon de Valera's government and father-in-law of Conor Cruise O'Brien. The families of Patrick McGilligan and Ernest Blythe were also frequent visitors to the FitzGerald household. FitzGerald's mother, the former Mabel Washington McConnell, was a nationalist and republican of Ulster Protestant descent. However, later in life she converted to Catholicism. Her son would later describe his political objective as the creation of a pluralist Ireland where the northern Protestants of his mother's family tradition and the southern Catholics of his father's could feel equally at home.

FitzGerald was educated at the Jesuit Belvedere College and University College Dublin (UCD), from which he graduated with a Bachelor of Arts honours degree in history, French and Spanish in 1946, later returning to complete a PhD in economics which he obtained in 1968; his doctoral thesis was published the following year, titled Planning in Ireland. He was deeply interested in the politics of the Spanish Civil War and World War II. A bright student who counted among his contemporaries in UCD his future political rival, Charles Haughey, who also knew Joan O'Farrell (1923–1999), a Liverpool-born fellow student, whom FitzGerald married in 1947. Their children were John, Mary, and Mark.

Following his university education, in 1947, he started working with Aer Lingus, the state airline of Ireland, and became an authority on the strategic economic planning of transport. During this time, he wrote many newspaper articles, was the Irish correspondent for British magazine The Economist, and was encouraged to write on National Accounts and economics by the features editor in the Irish Times. He remained with Aer Lingus until 1958; the following year, after undertaking a study of the economics of Irish industry at Trinity College Dublin, he became a lecturer in economics at UCD.

FitzGerald qualified as a barrister, from the King's Inns of Ireland, and spoke French fluently. (Note: Roy Jenkins recalled FitzGerald speaking fluent French at the opening of the European Parliament: "There, I thought, spoke the Ireland of Joyce and Synge and the Countess Markiewicz ... It was he who made me feel provincial.")

== Early political life ==
FitzGerald was eager to enter politics. Despite his pro-Treaty roots, several members of Fianna Fáil, including Charles Haughey and Michael Yeats, suggested that he should join that party. (Note: FitzGerald stated this in an interview with Ursula Halligan on the TV3 programme The Political Party.) Ultimately, FitzGerald made his entry into party politics under the banner of Fine Gael, of which his father had been a founding member. He attached himself to the party's liberal wing, which rallied around the Just Society programme written by Declan Costello. FitzGerald was elected to Seanad Éireann for the Industrial and Commercial Panel in 1965 and soon built up his political profile. FitzGerald was elected to Dáil Éireann at the 1969 general election, for the Dublin South-East constituency, the same year he obtained his PhD for a thesis later published under the title "Planning in Ireland". He became an important figure almost immediately in the parliamentary party, and his liberal ideas were seen as a counterweight to the conservative leader, Liam Cosgrave. The difference in political outlook and FitzGerald's ambitions for the Fine Gael leadership resulted in profound tensions between the two men. In his leadership address to the 1972 Fine Gael Ardfheis in Cork, Cosgrave referred to the "mongrel foxes" who should be rooted out of the party, a reference seen by many as an attack on FitzGerald's efforts to unseat him as leader.

FitzGerald was an opponent of the US bombing of North Vietnam.

== Minister for Foreign Affairs (1973–1977) ==
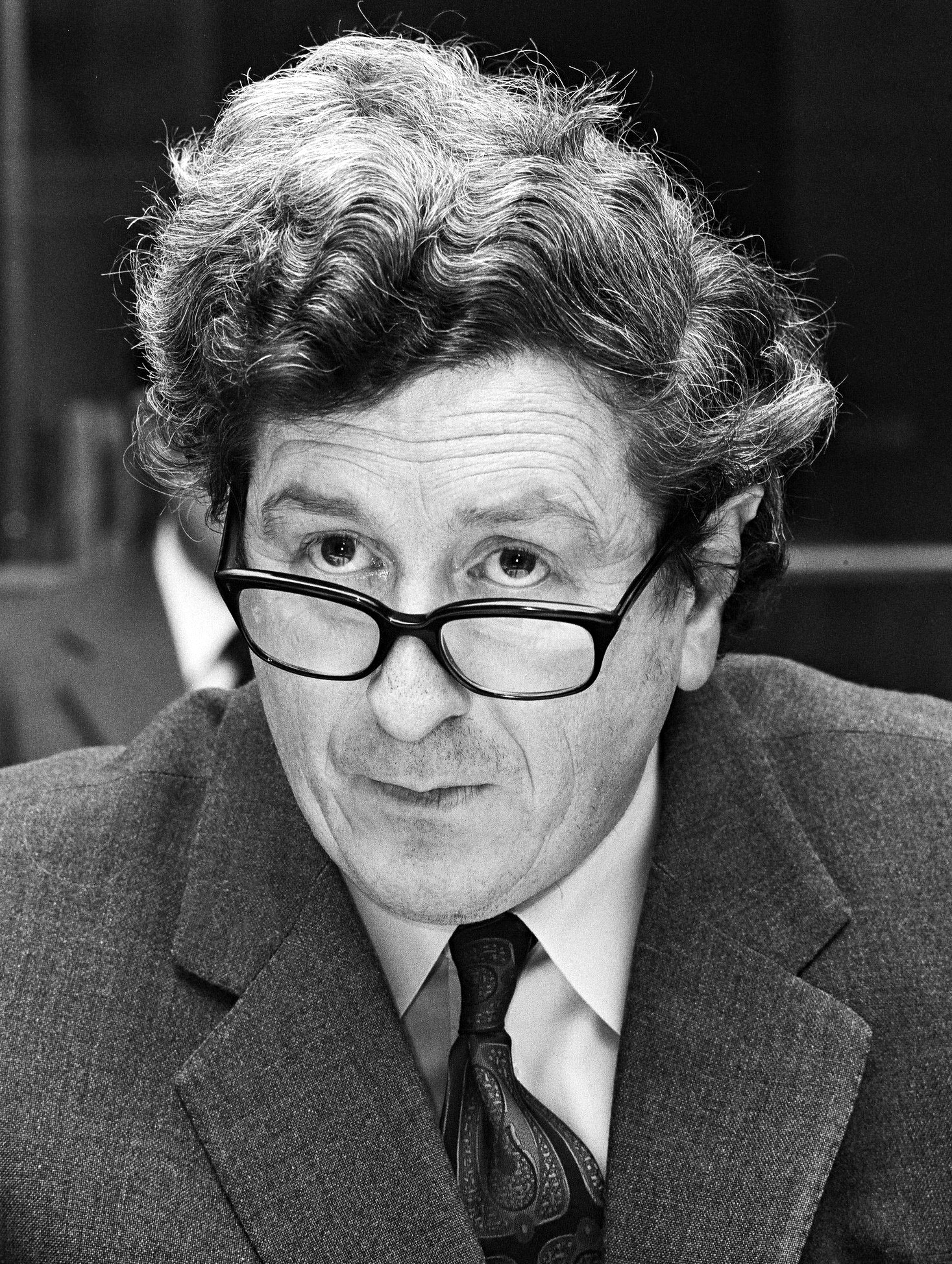
FitzGerald in 1975

After the 1973 general election, Fine Gael entered office in a coalition government with the Labour Party, with Liam Cosgrave as Taoiseach. FitzGerald hoped that he would take over as Minister for Finance, particularly after a good performance in a pre-election debate with the then Minister for Finance George Colley. However, the position went to Richie Ryan, with FitzGerald becoming Minister for Foreign Affairs. FitzGerald's father had held that same post in a government led by Liam Cosgrave's father W. T. Cosgrave, fifty years earlier. His appointment to Iveagh House (the headquarters of the Department of Foreign Affairs) would have a significant effect on FitzGerald's career and the future of Fine Gael. Cosgrave was suspicious of FitzGerald's liberal ideas and believed that he had designs on the leadership. During his period at Foreign Affairs, FitzGerald developed a good relationship with Liam Cosgrave, and all the tension between them in opposition disappeared.

The minister's role had changed substantially since his father's day. Ireland was no longer a member of the Commonwealth of Nations, but had in 1973 joined the European Economic Community (EEC), the organisation which would later become the European Union (EU). FitzGerald, firmly ensconced as Foreign Minister, was free from any blame due to other Ministers' mishandling of the economy. If anything, his tenure at the Department of Foreign Affairs helped him eventually achieve the party's leadership. His innovative views, energy and fluency in French won him – and through him, Ireland – a status in European affairs far exceeding the country's size and ensured that the first Irish Presidency of the European Council in 1975 was a noted success.

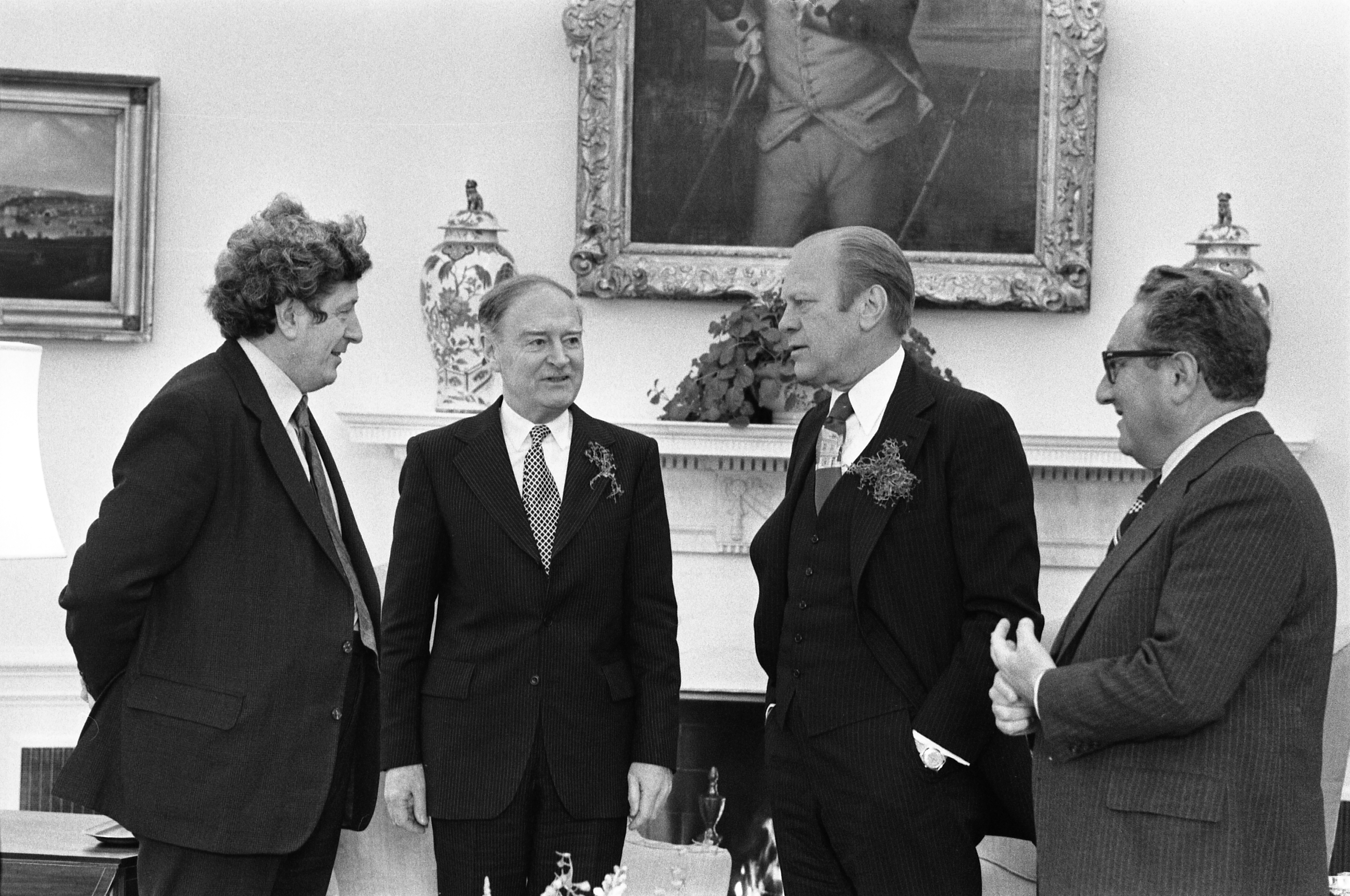
FitzGerald (l–r) with Taoiseach Liam Cosgrave, US president Gerald Ford and US secretary of state Henry Kissinger in the Oval Office on St Patrick's Day, 1976

FitzGerald's policy towards church-state relations, however, brought him into a confrontation with the Roman Catholic church, whose "special position" in the Republic had been enshrined in the constitution until the Referendum of December 1972. FitzGerald, in 1973, met the Cardinal Secretary of State, Agostino Casaroli, and proposed to modify the Republic's Constitution further to remove laws with overtly Catholic foundations, such as the bans on divorce and contraception, as well as to relax the public stigmas in Northern Ireland towards mixed religious marriages and integrated education. Casaroli initially seemed receptive, and the government formally submitted the proposal to the Vatican. FitzGerald's vision caused great consternation among the church's hierarchy, however, and in 1977, Pope Paul VI personally met with FitzGerald to tell him that "Ireland was a Catholic country – perhaps the only one left – and it should stay that way. Laws should not be changed in any way that would make the country less Catholic."

== Leadership of Fine Gael ==
In 1977, the National Coalition of Fine Gael and Labour suffered a disastrous electoral defeat in the general election. Liam Cosgrave resigned as party leader, and FitzGerald was chosen by acclamation to succeed him. In his new role as Leader of the Opposition and party leader, he set about modernising and revitalising Fine Gael. He immediately appointed a General-Secretary to oversee all of this, a tactic copied from Fianna Fáil. Under FitzGerald, Fine Gael experienced a rapid rise in support and popularity. After the November 1982 election, it held only five seats fewer than Fianna Fáil (the parties' closest-ever margin until 2011; at times Fianna Fáil was far larger, on one occasion well over twice as large), with Fine Gael in the Oireachtas (i.e. including the Seanad) larger than Fianna Fáil, which had been the dominant force in Irish politics for 40 years.

== Taoiseach (1981–1982) ==
By the time of the 1981 general election, Fine Gael had a party machine that could compete with Fianna Fáil. The party won 65 seats and formed a minority coalition government with the Labour Party and the support of several Independent TDs. FitzGerald was appointed as Taoiseach on 30 June 1981. FitzGerald excluded Richie Ryan, Richard Burke and Tom O'Donnell, former Fine Gael stalwarts, from the cabinet.

Two fundamental problems faced FitzGerald during his first period: Northern Ireland and the worsening economic situation. A protest march in support of the H-Block hunger strikers in July 1981 was harshly dealt with by FitzGerald. On one occasion where he met with relatives of the hunger strikers, he refused to meet the family of Bobby Sands, an MP for Fermanagh and South Tyrone and O/C of the Provisional IRA hunger strikers, and the first to die on this strike, along with the sister of Raymond McCreesh, who had died on 21 May. During the meeting, two of Thomas McElwee's sisters, Mary and Nora, broke down and left. Mary McElwee told the media outside that "he's doing nothing, he's asking for suggestions". FitzGerald then ordered Gardaí to remove the families from the meeting. FitzGerald's response was, in the words of Eamonn Sweeney, to "lay all the blame for the hunger strikers on the republican movement and to suggest an immediate unilateral end to their military campaign".

The economic crisis was also much worse than FitzGerald had feared. Fine Gael had to scrap its plans for tax cuts in the run-up to the election, and a draconian mid-year budget was introduced almost immediately. The July budget seemed exceptionally austere for a government dependent on Independent TDs support. The second budget introduced by John Bruton led to the government's defeat in the Dáil on the evening of 27 January 1982.

In light of this loss of supply, FitzGerald went to Áras an Uachtaráin to request a dissolution of the Dáil from the president, Patrick Hillery. The president may refuse to grant a dissolution when it was advised by a Taoiseach who has "ceased to retain the support of a majority in Dáil Éireann". When FitzGerald got there, he was informed that senior opposition figures (and some Independent TDs), including the Opposition leader (and former Taoiseach) Charles Haughey, Brian Lenihan and Sylvester Barrett, had made a series of telephone calls demanding that Hillery refuse the dissolution. Had Hillery done so, it would have forced FitzGerald's resignation as Taoiseach and enabled the Dáil to nominate someone else for the post—presumably Haughey. Hillery is said to have angrily rejected such pressure, regarding it as gross misconduct. He granted FitzGerald the dissolution. (Note: These events came back to haunt one of the callers, Brian Lenihan, when his differing accounts of his role that night led to his dismissal from Haughey's cabinet in 1990, during his own unsuccessful presidential election campaign.)

At the February 1982 general election, Fine Gael lost only two seats but was out of office. However, the November 1982 general election (the third election within eighteen months) resulted in FitzGerald being returned as Taoiseach for a second time, heading a Fine Gael–Labour coalition with a working majority.

== Taoiseach (1982–1987) ==
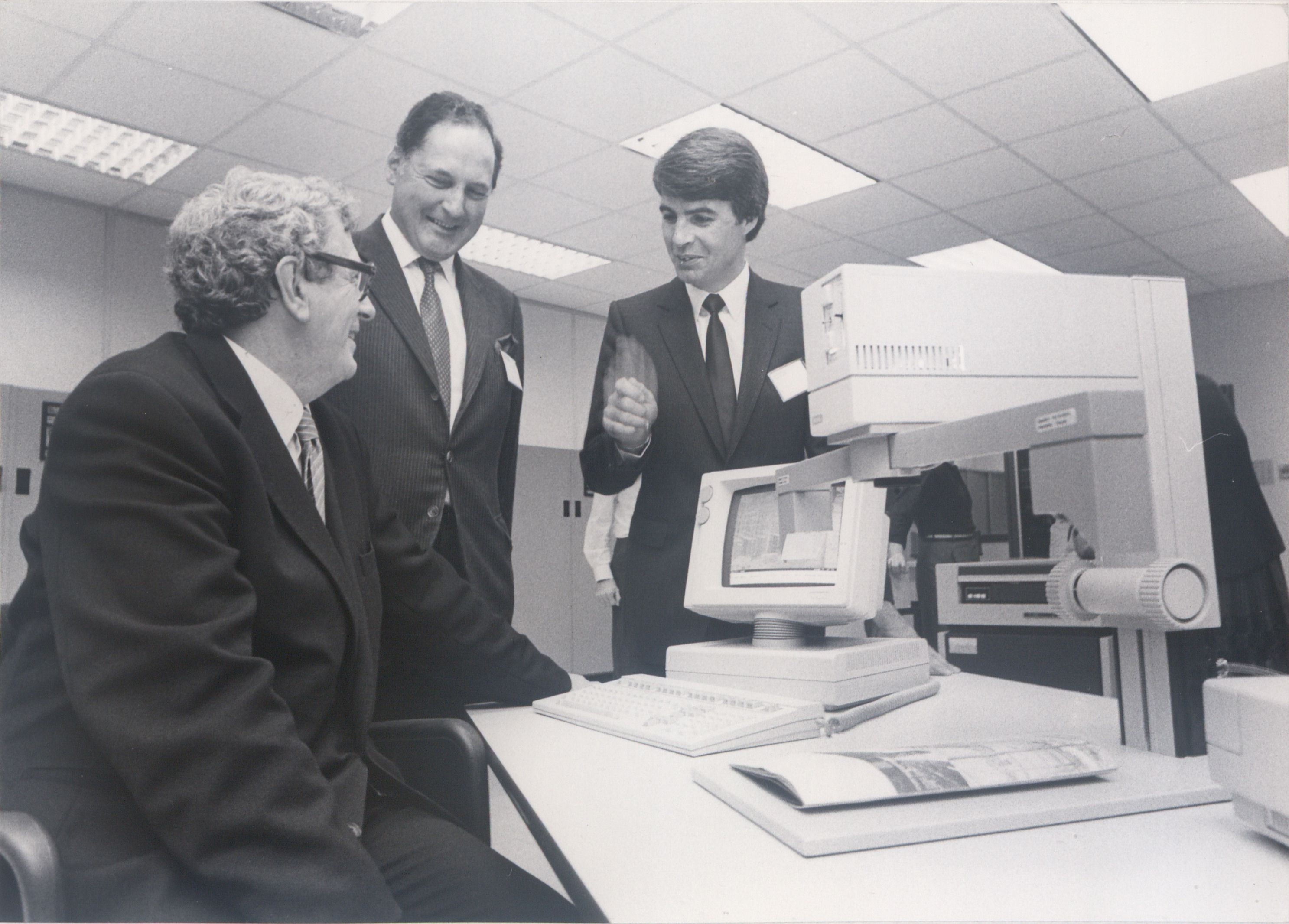
FitzGerald (left) at the official opening of the Wang facility in Plassey Technological Park, Limerick, 1984

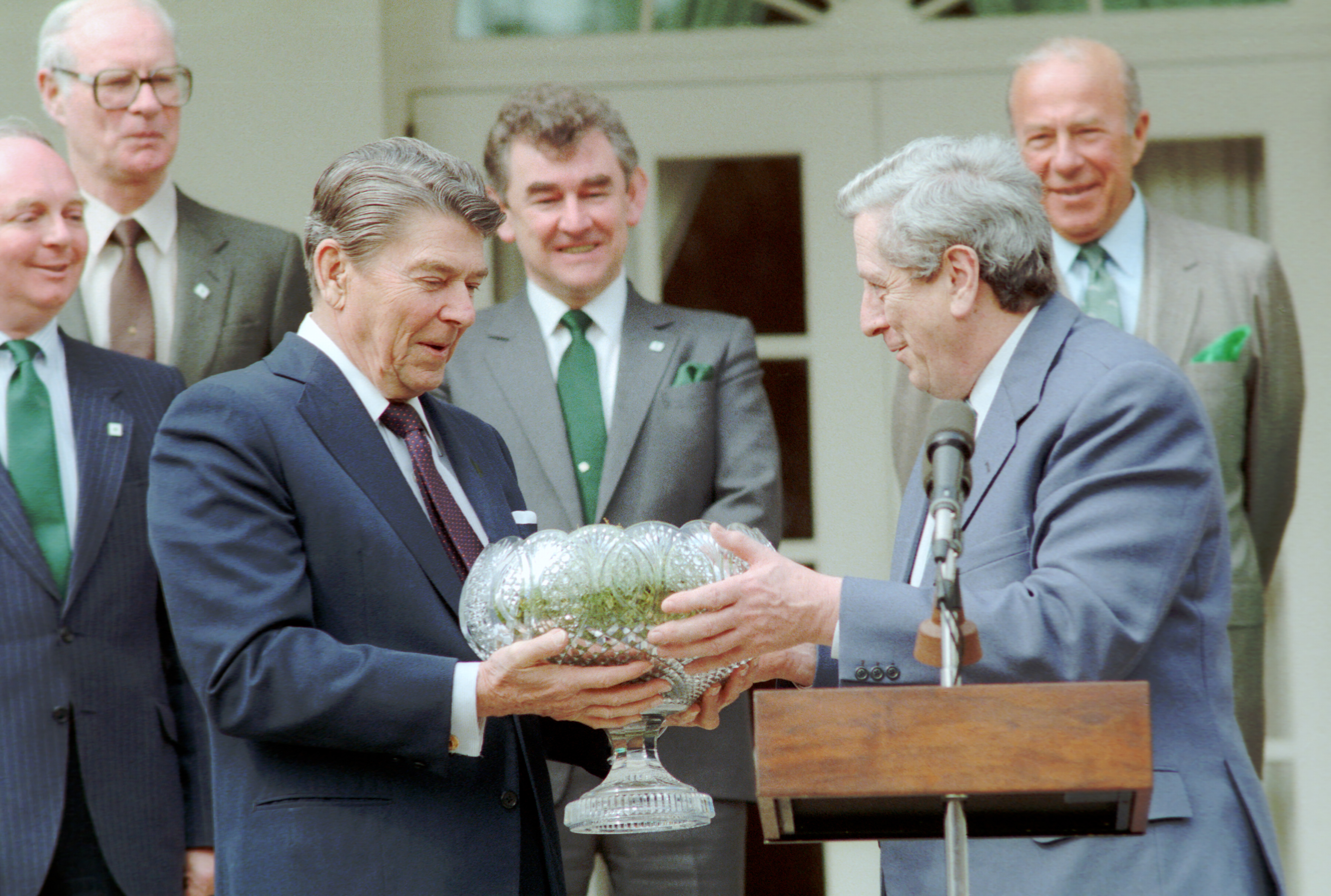
FitzGerald (right) giving a bowl of shamrocks to US president Ronald Reagan in the White House Rose Garden on St Patrick's Day, 1986

Deep economic recession dominated FitzGerald's second term as well as his first. Pursuing "fiscal rectitude" to reduce a high national debt required a firmer control of public spending than Labour found easy to accept. The harmonious relationship the Taoiseach developed with his Tánaiste, Dick Spring, successfully avoided a collapse of the coalition for more than four years, despite tensions between other Ministers, and enabled the government to survive. Fine Gael wanted to revive the economy by controlling public spending and imposing cutbacks to reduce the public budget deficit.

The measures proposed by FitzGerald's Minister for Finance, Alan Dukes, were utterly unacceptable to the Labour Party, which was under enormous pressure from its support base to maintain public services. The two parties in government found themselves in a stalemate position. They stopped the financial crisis from worsening but could not take the decisive action that would generate economic growth. With negligible economic growth and large-scale unemployment, the FitzGerald government was deeply unpopular with the public.

When FitzGerald attended a Bilderberg meeting in 1985, his rival Haughey suggested it had links with NATO, thus contravening Ireland's official position of neutrality.

=== Constitutional reform ===
As Taoiseach for a second time, FitzGerald advocated a liberalisation of Irish society to create what he called the non-sectarian nation of "Tone and Davis". The Eighth Amendment of the Constitution, which "[acknowledged] the right to life of the unborn", was approved in a referendum against the recommendation of FitzGerald. A proposal to allow divorce was defeated in a 1986 referendum; however, the law on contraception was liberalised under the Health (Family Planning) (Amendment) Act 1985.

=== Northern Ireland ===
FitzGerald set up the New Ireland Forum in 1983, which brought together representatives of the constitutional political parties in the Republic and the nationalist SDLP from Northern Ireland. Although the Unionist parties declined his invitation to join, and the Forum's conclusions proposing various forms of association between Northern Ireland and the Republic were rejected outright by British prime minister Margaret Thatcher, the Forum provided the impetus for the resumption of serious negotiations between the Irish and British governments, which culminated in the Anglo-Irish Agreement of November 1985. This agreement provided for a mechanism by which the British government could consult the Republic of Ireland regarding the governance of Northern Ireland, and was bitterly opposed by Unionists in Northern Ireland, whose MPs all resigned their seats in the British Parliament in protest. New elections were required to be held in Northern Ireland, in which the unionists lost the seat of Newry and Armagh to Seamus Mallon of the SDLP. During this period, on 15 March 1984, he was also invited to address a joint session of the United States Congress, the fourth Irish leader to do so. (Note: Six Irish leaders have addressed joint sessions of the US Congress: Seán T. O'Kelly (1959), Éamon de Valera (1964), Liam Cosgrave (1976), FitzGerald (1984), John Bruton (1996) and Bertie Ahern (2008).)

His government had also passed the Extradition Act 1987, which ended the long-standing defence against extradition of suspects who could plead that an act of violence in Northern Ireland or Britain was a political offence.

While the agreement was repudiated and condemned by Unionists, it was said to become the basis for developing trust and joint action between the governments, which in time would ultimately bring about the Downing Street Declaration of 1993 and the subsequent republican and loyalist cease-fires.

=== Infighting and declining support ===
FitzGerald attempted to reshuffle his cabinet in February 1986, but certain ministers resisted – notably Barry Desmond, who refused to move from his Health and Social Welfare portfolio. The eventual outcome of the cabinet changes further undermined FitzGerald's authority. The new Progressive Democrats party was launched later that year by Desmond O'Malley out of the divisions within Fianna Fáil. It struck an immediate chord with many disenchanted Fine Gael supporters who had tired of the failure to address the economic crisis fully and who yearned for a coherent right-wing policy from FitzGerald. Seeing their party's support base under attack from the right only strengthened the resolve of FitzGerald's Fine Gael colleagues to break with the Labour Party approach, despite their leader's close empathy with Labour.

Stymied by the economic crisis, FitzGerald tried to rescue some of his ambitions to reform the state, and he proposed, in the middle of 1986, a referendum to change the constitution to allow for divorce. The proposed amendment was mired in controversy, and the many accompanying legal changes needed were not presented. Haughey skilfully opposed the referendum along with the Roman Catholic Church and landed interests worried about property rights.

In January 1987, the Labour Party members of the government withdrew from the government over disagreements due to budget proposals. Lacking a parliamentary majority, FitzGerald sought a dissolution of the Dáil, which was granted, continuing to lead a minority Fine Gael government until after the election. In the 1987 general election, Fine Gael stood on the proposed stringent budgetary cutbacks that Labour had blocked for four years. Fianna Fáil returned to office in March 1987 after Fine Gael was heavily defeated in the election. The Progressive Democrats won 14 seats, mainly from Fine Gael. Although Haughey did not have an overall majority, when it came to the Dáil vote on the nomination of Taoiseach, the Independent left-wing TD Tony Gregory voted against FitzGerald but abstained on Haughey, seeing Haughey as the "lesser of two evils". This was because of Gregory's opposition to the Anglo-Irish agreement and his strong personal dislike for FitzGerald. Haughey was elected Taoiseach on the casting vote of the Ceann Comhairle.

== Post-Taoiseach period ==
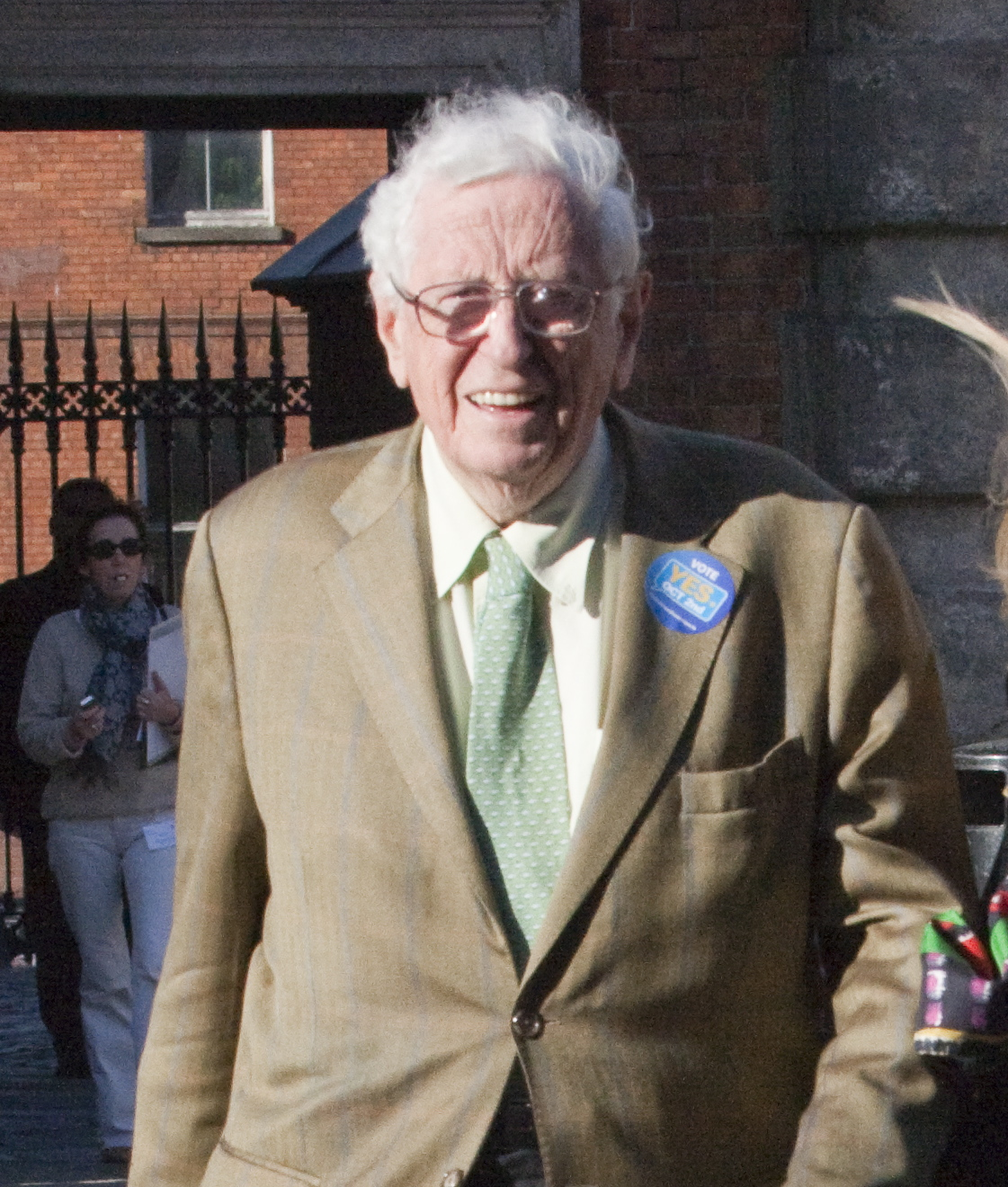
FitzGerald arriving for the Lisbon Treaty referendum count in 2009

FitzGerald retired as leader of Fine Gael immediately after the Dáil elected Haughey as Taoiseach; the parliamentary party elected Alan Dukes in his place. His autobiography All in a Life appeared in 1991, immediately becoming a best-seller. He retired completely from politics at the 1992 general election. His wife, Joan, predeceased him in 1999 after a long illness.

After that, FitzGerald wrote a weekly column every Saturday in The Irish Times and lectured widely at home and abroad on public affairs. (Note: In a leading article on FitzGerald's death, The Irish Times said that the "extraordinary Irishman who fashioned our future in so many ways" was their longest-serving contributor and columnist for over 57 years.) He came out of retirement to campaign for a "yes" vote in the second Irish referendum on the EU's Treaty of Nice, held in 2002. He held the post of Chancellor of the National University of Ireland from 1997 to 2009. In March 2000, FitzGerald was on the board of directors of Election.com when it conducted the world's first public election ever held over the Internet, Arizona's Democratic primary; in that primary, voter turnout increased more than 500% over the 1996 primary.

FitzGerald took a leading part in the campaign for a second referendum on the EU's Treaty of Lisbon in 2009. He argued for Ireland to continue with European integration. FitzGerald had been scathing of the record of the Fianna Fáil–led government since 1997 on the economy and the national finances. In his Irish Times column, he was a frequent critic of the loss of competitiveness and the inflation caused by the tax cuts and excessive public spending increases of the Celtic Tiger era. In 2009, FitzGerald received a new ministerial car, the first and only one to be purchased by the state since an economic recession hit Ireland in 2008. In 2010, FitzGerald appeared on RTÉ's "Top 40 Irishmen" list.

He was vice-president of the Railway Preservation Society of Ireland for his last 20 years.

== Finances ==
In early 1999, it emerged that some six years earlier, Allied Irish Banks (AIB) and Ansbacher Banks wrote off debts of almost IR£ 200,000 owed by FitzGerald, following the collapse of the aircraft leasing company, Guinness Peat Aviation (GPA), in which he was a shareholder. The chairman of AIB at the time, Peter Sutherland, was also a former director of GPA and had served as Attorney General under FitzGerald, prior to FitzGerald appointing him as Ireland's member of the European Commission. The Moriarty Tribunal investigated this matter, and compared the treatment by AIB of FitzGerald with their treatment of Charles Haughey. (Note: It was commented that "FitzGerald's case involved the effective exhaustion of his assets ... to achieve a settlement" and that, in contrast, "Haughey's assets were retained virtually intact".) They found evidence that he had worked to compromise his indebtedness with AIB and no evidence of any wrongdoing. (Note: Indeed, the Tribunal heard evidence as to the hardship that FitzGerald went to – to the extent of selling off his family home – to repay the debt to his utmost ability.)

== Illness and death ==
On 5 May 2011, it was reported that FitzGerald was seriously ill in a Dublin hospital. Newly elected Fine Gael Taoiseach Enda Kenny sent his regards and called him an "institution"; on 6 May he was put on a ventilator. On 19 May, after suffering from pneumonia, he died at the Mater Private Hospital in Dublin, at the age of 85.

In a statement, Irish president Mary McAleese hailed FitzGerald as "a man steeped in the history of the State who constantly strove to make Ireland a better place for all its people". Taoiseach Enda Kenny paid homage to "a truly remarkable man who made a truly remarkable contribution to Ireland". Henry Kissinger, the former US secretary of state who served as an opposite number to FitzGerald in the 1970s, recalled "an intelligent and amusing man who was dedicated to his country".

His death occurred on the third day of Queen Elizabeth II's state visit to the Republic of Ireland, an event designed to mark the completion of the Northern Ireland peace process that had been "built on the foundations" of FitzGerald's Hillsborough Agreement with Margaret Thatcher in 1985. In a personal message, the Queen offered her sympathies and said she was "saddened" to learn of FitzGerald's death. British prime minister David Cameron, who was also in Ireland, paid tribute to FitzGerald's "huge contribution to the peace process bringing reconciliation for all that had happened in the past". On his visit to Dublin, US president Barack Obama offered condolences on FitzGerald's death; he spoke of "someone who believed in the power of education; someone who believed in the potential of youth; most of all, someone who believed in the potential of peace and who lived to see that peace realised".

FitzGerald was buried at Shanganagh Cemetery.

=== Remembrance ===
In February 2012, Young Fine Gael (YFG) announced that its annual summer school would be renamed the Garret FitzGerald YFG Summer School.

== Governments led ==
FitzGerald led the following governments:

- 17th government of Ireland (22nd Dáil; June 1981 – March 1982)
- 19th government of Ireland (24th Dáil; December 1982 – March 1987)

== Honorary doctorates ==
- 1985: (Canada) Saint Mary's University
- 1986: (United Kingdom) Keele University
- 1987: (United States) Boston College
- 1987: (United Kingdom) Oxford University
- 1991: (Republic of Ireland) National University of Ireland
- 1999: (Republic of Ireland) Trinity College Dublin
- 2003: (United Kingdom) Ulster University
- 2011: (United Kingdom) Open University

== Notes ==
Political offices
Preceded by Brian Lenihan	Minister for Foreign Affairs; 1973–1977	Succeeded by Michael O'Kennedy
Preceded by Jack Lynch	Leader of the Opposition; 1977–1981	Succeeded by Charles Haughey
Preceded by Charles Haughey	Taoiseach; 1981–1982	Succeeded by Charles Haughey
Preceded by Charles Haughey	Leader of the Opposition; March–December 1982	Succeeded by Charles Haughey
Preceded by Charles Haughey	Taoiseach; 1982–1987	Succeeded by Charles Haughey
Academic offices
Preceded by Liam Cosgrave	Leader of Fine Gael; 1977–1987	Succeeded by Alan Dukes
Preceded by T. K. Whitaker	Chancellor of the National University of Ireland; 1997–2009	Succeeded by Maurice Manning

Dáil	Election	Deputy (Party)	Deputy (Party)	Deputy (Party)	Deputy (Party)
13th	1948	John A. Costello (FG)	Seán MacEntee (FF)	Noël Browne (CnaP)	3 seats 1948–1981
14th	1951	John A. Costello (FG)	Seán MacEntee (FF)	Noël Browne (Ind.)	3 seats 1948–1981
15th	1954	John A. Costello (FG)	Seán MacEntee (FF)	John O'Donovan (FG)	3 seats 1948–1981
16th	1957	John A. Costello (FG)	Seán MacEntee (FF)	Noël Browne (Ind.)	3 seats 1948–1981
17th	1961	John A. Costello (FG)	Seán MacEntee (FF)	Noël Browne (NPD)	3 seats 1948–1981
18th	1965	John A. Costello (FG)	Seán MacEntee (FF)	Seán Moore (FF)	3 seats 1948–1981
19th	1969	Garret FitzGerald (FG)	Noël Browne (Lab)	Seán Moore (FF)	3 seats 1948–1981
20th	1973	Garret FitzGerald (FG)	Fergus O'Brien (FG)	Seán Moore (FF)	3 seats 1948–1981
21st	1977	Garret FitzGerald (FG)	Ruairi Quinn (Lab)	Seán Moore (FF)	3 seats 1948–1981
22nd	1981	Garret FitzGerald (FG)	Gerard Brady (FF)	Seán Moore (FF)	Richie Ryan (FG)
23rd	1982 (Feb)	Garret FitzGerald (FG)	Gerard Brady (FF)	Ruairi Quinn (Lab)	Alexis FitzGerald Jnr (FG)
24th	1982 (Nov)	Garret FitzGerald (FG)	Gerard Brady (FF)	Ruairi Quinn (Lab)	Joe Doyle (FG)
25th	1987	Garret FitzGerald (FG)	Gerard Brady (FF)	Ruairi Quinn (Lab)	Michael McDowell (PDs)
26th	1989	Garret FitzGerald (FG)	Gerard Brady (FF)	Ruairi Quinn (Lab)	Joe Doyle (FG)
27th	1992	Frances Fitzgerald (FG)	Eoin Ryan Jnr (FF)	Ruairi Quinn (Lab)	Michael McDowell (PDs)
28th	1997	Frances Fitzgerald (FG)	Eoin Ryan Jnr (FF)	Ruairi Quinn (Lab)	John Gormley (GP)
29th	2002	Michael McDowell (PDs)	Eoin Ryan Jnr (FF)	Ruairi Quinn (Lab)	John Gormley (GP)
30th	2007	Lucinda Creighton (FG)	Chris Andrews (FF)	Ruairi Quinn (Lab)	John Gormley (GP)
31st	2011	Lucinda Creighton (FG)	Eoghan Murphy (FG)	Ruairi Quinn (Lab)	Kevin Humphreys (Lab)
32nd	2016	Constituency abolished. See Dublin Bay South.			
