= Desmond FitzGerald (architect) =

Irish architect

- Born: 5 November 1911; Saint-Jean-du-Doigt, Brittany, France
- Died: 14 January 1987 (aged 75); Dublin, Ireland

Desmond FitzGerald (5 November 1911 – 14 January 1987) was an Irish architect. His most notable work is the original Dublin Airport terminal building.

== Early life and family ==
Desmond FitzGerald was born in Saint-Jean-du-Doigt, Brittany, France on 5 November 1911. His parents were Mabel (née McConnell) and politician and writer, Desmond FitzGerald. He was the eldest of four brothers, Pierce (1914–1986), Fergus (1920–1983) and Garret (1926–2011). The family moved often once they returned to Ireland, resulting in FitzGerald attending numerous primary schools such as Scoil Bhríghde and Fr John Sweetman's school in Wexford. He later attended Clongowes Wood College and Belvedere College, and Collège Cantonal Saint-Michel at Fribourg and the Collegio Don Bosco, Maroggia in Switzerland. There he became proficient in Italian and French. In October 1930, he entered University College Dublin (UCD) to study architecture. He graduated in 1934, with a thesis on an airport for Dublin. He spent a time in London studying town planning under Patrick Abercrombie. In England he worked on the area plan for the Bexhill Pavilion in Sussex.

In July 1938, he married Kay Gore-Grimes. They had three children, Catherine, Desmond and Caroline. From 1945, the family lived at St Declan's, Killiney, County Dublin.

== Career ==
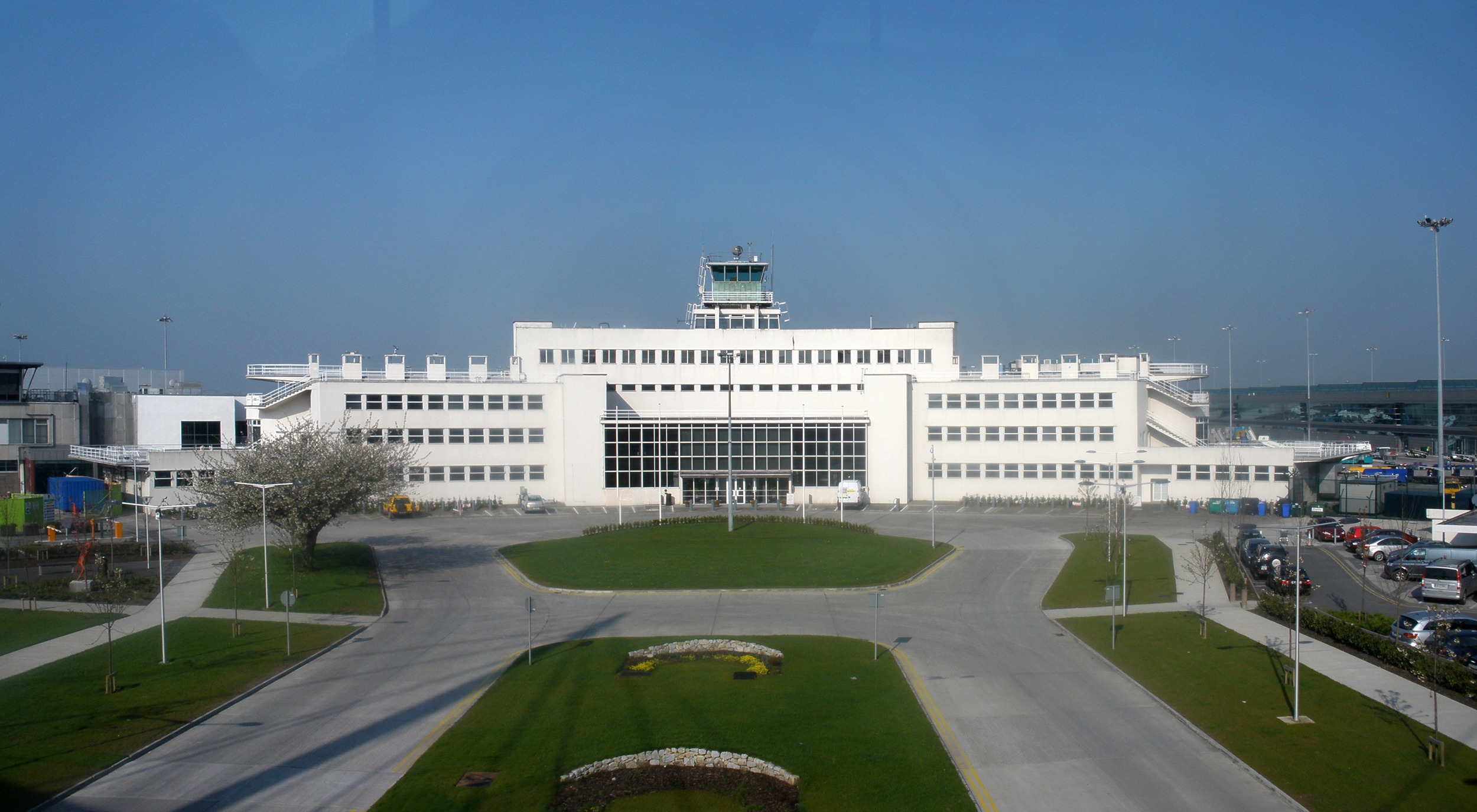
Dublin Airport 1940 terminal building

FitzGerald's first job was with the Department of Industry and Commerce, where he led the design team for the new terminal building at Dublin Airport from 1937. It was completed in 1940, but was kept a secret due to security concerns relating to the Emergency. He was later awarded the triennial gold medal of the Royal Institute of the Architects of Ireland in 1943 for the design. In accessing the building in relation to FitzGerald's later work, it is widely accepted that the design was not solely or mostly his, but the design of his team.

He was appointed president of the Architects Association of Ireland, and established his own architectural practice on Merrion Square, Dublin. From there, he designed the Moyne Institute, Trinity College Dublin in 1953, a compromise of modernism and traditionalism. Known for his cost control and business acumen, he was the designer of a large number of office and residential developments throughout the 1950s and 1960s.

== Qualification ==
It has been questioned if FitzGerald's passion lay in architecture. As a young man, he wanted to be an astronomer, and was known to be an accomplished mathematician. He is said to have confided in some that he shouldn't have become an architect, but an economist. He was appointed professor of architecture at UCD in 1951, and is broadly seen as ineffective in that position overseeing a period which lacked innovation or direction. When it emerged that the students could lose the recognition of their qualifications in Britain, it led to conflict between FitzGerald and the students. They campaigned successfully to have him replaced, and in 1969 he stepped down from the professorship and was appointed as research chair of architecture and town planning, a newly created position. He also served on the Royal Town Planning Institute as a member. He played an active part in the unsuccessful campaign to save Frescati House. He maintained his architectural practice until shortly before his death on 14 January 1987 in Dublin.

== Notable buildings ==
- Dublin Airport, original terminal one building (1940)
- O'Connell Bridge House (1965)
- D'Olier House (c. 1970)
- St Ann's, a block of luxury apartments, Donnybrook
- Dublin Corporation flats on Dominick Street
- Headquarters of Cement Ltd, corner of Pembroke Street and Fitzwilliam Square
- EEC commission's Dublin office on Molesworth Street (since redeveloped)
- Former Department of Justice building, St Stephen's Green
- Moyne Institute, Trinity College Dublin (1953)
