= Desmond FitzGerald (politician) =

Irish revolutionary and politician (1888–1947)

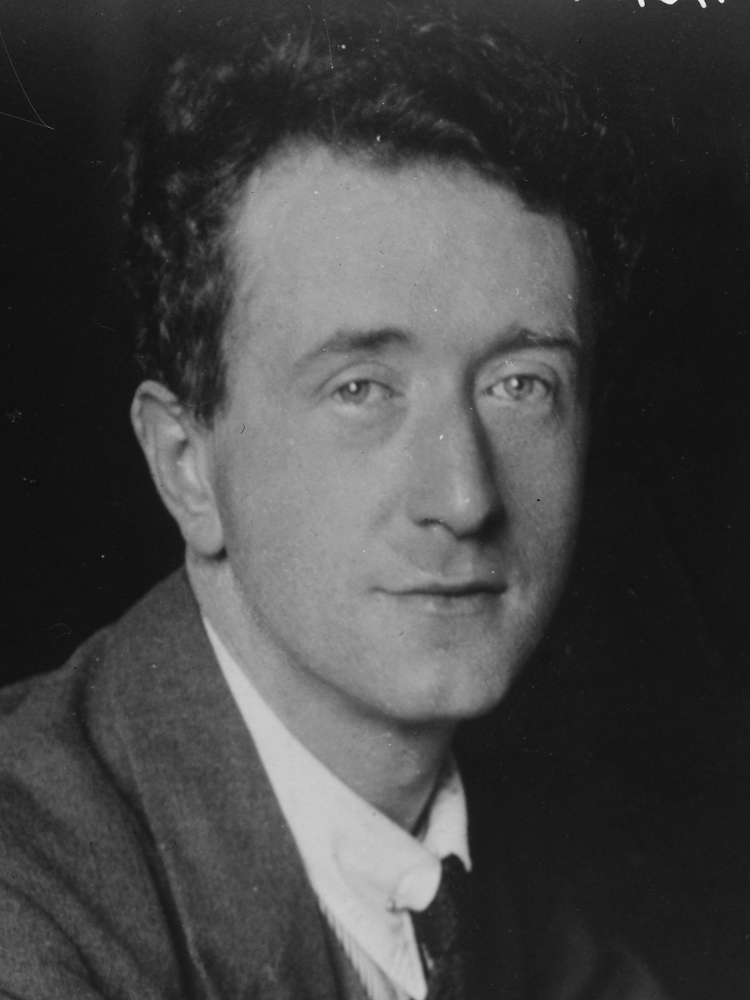
- FitzGerald in 1921

Minister for Defence
- In office 23 June 1927 – 9 March 1932
- President: W. T. Cosgrave
- Preceded by: Peter Hughes
- Succeeded by: Frank Aiken

Minister for External Affairs
- In office 30 August 1922 – 23 June 1927
- President: W. T. Cosgrave
- Preceded by: Michael Hayes
- Succeeded by: Kevin O'Higgins

Minister for Publicity
- In office 26 August 1921 – 9 September 1922
- President: W. T. Cosgrave
- Preceded by: Office created
- Succeeded by: Office abolished

Director of Publicity
- In office 17 June 1919 – 11 February 1921
- Preceded by: Laurence Ginnell
- Succeeded by: Erskine Childers

Senator
- In office 7 September 1938 – 8 September 1943
- Constituency: Administrative Panel

Teachta Dála
- In office February 1932 – July 1937
- Constituency: Carlow–Kilkenny
- In office May 1921 – February 1932
- Constituency: Dublin County
- In office December 1918 – May 1921
- Constituency: Dublin Pembroke

Personal details
- Born: Thomas Joseph FitzGerald; 13 February 1888 Forest Gate, Essex, England
- Died: 9 April 1947 (aged 59) Ballsbridge, Dublin, Ireland
- Party: Sinn Féin (1918–1922); Cumann na nGaedheal (1922–1933); Fine Gael (1933–1943)
- Spouse: Mabel McConnell (m. 1911)
- Children: 4, including Garret and Desmond
- Relatives: John D. FitzGerald (grandson); Eithne FitzGerald (granddaughter-in-law)
- Education: St Bonaventure's

Military service
- Branch/service: Irish Volunteers
- Battles/wars: Easter Rising

Desmond FitzGerald (born Thomas Joseph FitzGerald; 13 February 1888 – 9 April 1947) was an Irish revolutionary, politician, and poet, known for his role in the Irish independence movement and for his ministerial roles in Irish governments; he was Director of Publicity from 1919 to 1921, Minister for Publicity from 1921 to 1922, Minister for External Affairs from 1922 to 1927 and finally Minister for Defence from 1927 to 1932. Born in London to an Irish family, FitzGerald moved to Paris in his early twenties, where he became involved in the Imagist group of poets. In 1913, FitzGerald returned to Ireland and the next year became active in the Irish Volunteers, a paramilitary organisation that sought Irish independence from Britain. FitzGerald took part in the Easter Rising of 1916 in Dublin and was subsequently imprisoned for two years by the British.

FitzGerald was elected as a Sinn Féin MP in 1918, leading to his release from custody. During the Irish War of Independence FitzGerald worked as the rebels' Minister for Publicity. Following the signing of the Anglo-Irish Treaty in 1921, he supported the pro-Treaty side, leading to his involvement in the Irish Civil War as a member of the Free State government. He served as Minister for External Affairs from 1922 to 1927, during which he worked to establish the international presence of the newly formed Irish Free State on behalf of the Cumann na nGaedhael political party. His presence in Irish politics greatly lessened after his party's defeat in the 1932 Irish general election. By the end of the 1930s, he pivoted his career towards academics.

His son, Garret FitzGerald, would later become Taoiseach.

== Early life ==
Desmond FitzGerald was born Thomas Joseph FitzGerald in Forest Gate in West Ham, Essex in 1888. His parents were Patrick Fitzgerald (1831–1908), a labourer from south Tipperary, and Mary Anne Scollard (1847–1927) from Castleisland, County Kerry. He changed his first name as a teenager to the more romantic "Desmond", and first visited Ireland in 1910. He was a student at St Bonaventure's.

In London, he was a member of the Tour Eiffel group of poets and writers, which included Ezra Pound, T. E. Hulme, F. S. Flint and another Irish writer, Joseph Campbell. The group was named after the restaurant in which the group met, the Tour Eiffel in Soho. In April 1908, FitzGerald and Florence Farr introduced Ezra Pound to the Tour Eiffel group, a meeting out of which the Imagist group was later to emerge.

== Marriage and family ==
In 1911 FitzGerald, a Catholic, married Mabel Washington McConnell (1884–1958), a daughter of John McConnell, a whiskey salesman from Belfast, and granddaughter of a Presbyterian farmer near the city. Educated at Queen's University Belfast, she shared FitzGerald's interest in the Irish language; she met him in London at a language seminar. They lived in France until moving to County Kerry in March 1913. During this period he became involved with the Imagist group of poets. They had four children: Desmond (1911–1987), Pierce (1914–1986), Fergus (1920–1983) and Garret (1926–2011).

== Irish nationalist ==
FitzGerald joined the Irish Volunteers in 1914 and organised a Volunteers group in County Kerry. As an organizer he was expected to drill even the most unsuited recruits. This offended his disciplined morality. The organization was under enormous pressure: many leaders were expelled in July 1915 under the Defence of the Realm Act 1914. FitzGerald took the place of Ernest Blythe. In 1915 FitzGerald was imprisoned for making a speech against recruitment during the First World War. He was later expelled from Kerry, and moved to County Wicklow. FitzGerald's abstemious, parsimonious character, backed up by a long Anglo-Norman family history, made him an unpopular figure in the movement. He felt his bosses were unaware of his situation.

=== Easter Rising ===
During the occupation of the General Post Office during the 1916 Rising, he commented "I was bemused by the general attitude of security". At the height of the battle he was in the midst of the conflagration that shook the GPO garrison. Ever the sceptic, FitzGerald, who was in charge of rations, mentions in his memoir of the 1916 Rising the sudden and unexpected mobilisation, followed by a description of conditions in the GPO, the rebels' headquarters. While many accounts describe the Rising as a form of blood sacrifice, FitzGerald discussed its wider rationale with the leader Patrick Pearse, and with Joseph Plunkett who had travelled to Germany in 1915 for assistance. They expected that Germany would win the First World War, and that a rising of at least three days would allow Ireland to take a seat at the peace conference. Though declaring an Irish Republic in 1916, they considered it would probably be necessary to invite the Kaiser's youngest son Joachim to reign over a reformed kingdom of Ireland after the war, where Irish was to again become the everyday language.

=== Revolutionary period ===
FitzGerald was released in 1918 when he was elected as a Sinn Féin MP for the Dublin Pembroke constituency. Following the assembly of the First Dáil in 1919, and the declaration of the Irish Republic, he was appointed Director of Publicity for Dáil Éireann, first joining the paper Nationality in May to replace the arrested Laurence Ginnell. FitzGerald remarked in the first report he made to the Dáil that 'our chief means of publicity was by means of publicity'. He struggled to make an impression on the British press, who supplied most of Ireland's foreign news.

In May 1919, Erskine Childers, FitzGerald's friend and colleague, went to Versailles intending to be part of the Peace Conference. Childers became increasingly frustrated by the high-handed British attitude towards Irish independence. FitzGerald started a mimeograph entitled Weekly Summary of Acts of Aggression by the Enemy in July 1919. By November he had joined with Childers to produce the Irish Bulletin. For twenty-two months they publicized the crimes of England, with the purpose of bolstering the Dáil's credibility with Sinn Féin. Despite the Dáil's complaint in 1920 that the lists were "inadequate", the momentum behind the Propaganda Department threw their opponents into confusion.

During the Irish War of Independence (1919–1921) the Bulletin managed to publicise the aims of the Irish Republic to the wider world with increasing success, and removed the likelihood of the conflict being widened. In devising a strategy to retain Ulster, leading republican Ernest Blythe believed a blockade would be disastrous for Belfast. Conversely, Seán MacEntee demanded a response to what he considered to be a war of extermination against nationalism; there was, he argued, "the potent weapon of blockade". Many leading republicans were firmly against it: FitzGerald declared a blockade would be tantamount "to a vote for partition". The Dáil's department seemed to be winning the propaganda war with the Castle, whose operations could not convince the public. The Secretariat was convinced the Bulletin should continue, when its papers and materials were seized in a raid. FitzGerald was arrested in March 1921, but was released. In late August 1921 Éamon de Valera reshuffled his Cabinet, in which FitzGerald was not included; although in replacing Childers he was named Minister of Publicity. He was one of the TDs who were unsuccessful in persuading de Valera to join the negotiators of the Anglo-Irish Treaty that was signed on 6 December.

== Government minister ==
FitzGerald supported the Treaty. On 30 August 1922, he was designated the Minister for External Affairs of the Provisional Government of Southern Ireland. On the date he was appointed, Southern Ireland was still part of the UK; only because the administration was a transitional one did it have a Minister for External Affairs. The Irish Free State was established on 6 December 1922.

FitzGerald, by letter dated 17 April 1923, applied on behalf of the Irish Free State for membership of the League of Nations. Ireland was admitted to membership the following year. FitzGerald also represented the new state at the Imperial Conferences. In 1927 FitzGerald became Minister for Defence.

== Latter years in politics ==
Following the defeat of the government in 1932 general election, FitzGerald's interest in politics began to wane, although he continued to be involved. In 1933, following the merger of Cumann na nGaedhael, the National Centre Party and the Army Comrades Association (Blueshirts), FitzGerald became a member of the ACA. FitzGerald attempted to add "intellectual substance" to the organisation and was one of the members of the Oireachtas who wore their uniform into the Chambers before doing so was outlawed by the new Fianna Fáil government.

The 1930s saw FitzGerald radicalised by world events, and FitzGerald began to take the view that in a showdown between the forces of Fascism and Communism occurred, he would choose Fascism. FitzGerald supported Franco's nationalists in the Spanish Civil War, and, for a time, was supportive of Hitler's Germany. In private, FitzGerald began to indulge in anti-Semitic impulses, although he never did so publicly.

FitzGerald lost his seat in the 1937 general election but was thereafter elected to Seanad Éireann, where he remained until retiring from politics in 1943 following a bad loss in the 1943 general election where he placed 9th. Some historians attribute FitzGerald's 1937 loss to the fact he had pulled away from his constituency to begin work as a lecturer in the philosophy of politics at the University of Notre Dame, Indiana, USA. This position only lasted a year but lead to FitzGerald switching his attention to writing the book Preface to Statecraft (1939).

== Final years ==
FitzGerald spent some of the World War II period in Stratford, England managing his brother France's chemical Factory following France's death in 1941.

== Personal life ==
One of his sons, Garret FitzGerald, likewise served as Minister for Foreign Affairs in the 1970s and Taoiseach on two occasions in the 1980s.

Desmond FitzGerald died of a heart attack on 9 April 1947 in Dublin, aged 59.

== See also ==
- Families in the Oireachtas

Parliament of the United Kingdom
New constituency	Member of Parliament for Dublin Pembroke; 1918–1922	Constituency abolished
Oireachtas
New constituency	Teachta Dála for Dublin Pembroke; 1918–1921	Constituency abolished
Political offices
New office	Minister for Publicity; 1921–1922	Office abolished
Preceded by Michael Hayes	Minister for External Affairs; 1922–1927	Succeeded by Kevin O'Higgins
Preceded by Peter Hughes	Minister for Defence; 1927–1932	Succeeded by Frank Aiken

Dáil	Election	Deputy (Party)	Deputy (Party)	Deputy (Party)	Deputy (Party)	Deputy (Party)
2nd	1921	Edward Aylward (SF)	W. T. Cosgrave (SF)	James Lennon (SF)	Gearóid O'Sullivan (SF)	4 seats 1921–1923
3rd	1922	Patrick Gaffney (Lab)	W. T. Cosgrave (PT-SF)	Denis Gorey (FP)	Gearóid O'Sullivan (PT-SF)	4 seats 1921–1923
4th	1923	Edward Doyle (Lab)	W. T. Cosgrave (CnaG)	Denis Gorey (FP)	Michael Shelly (Rep)	Seán Gibbons (CnaG)
4th	1925 by-election	Edward Doyle (Lab)	W. T. Cosgrave (CnaG)	Denis Gorey (FP)	Michael Shelly (Rep)	Thomas Bolger (CnaG)
5th	1927 (Jun)	Edward Doyle (Lab)	W. T. Cosgrave (CnaG)	Denis Gorey (CnaG)	Thomas Derrig (FF)	Richard Holohan (FP)
6th	1927 (Sep)	Edward Doyle (Lab)	W. T. Cosgrave (CnaG)	Peter de Loughry (CnaG)	Thomas Derrig (FF)	Richard Holohan (FP)
6th	1927 by-election	Edward Doyle (Lab)	Denis Gorey (CnaG)	Peter de Loughry (CnaG)	Thomas Derrig (FF)	Richard Holohan (FP)
7th	1932	Francis Humphreys (FF)	Denis Gorey (CnaG)	Desmond FitzGerald (CnaG)	Thomas Derrig (FF)	Seán Gibbons (FF)
8th	1933	James Pattison (Lab)	Richard Holohan (NCP)	Desmond FitzGerald (CnaG)	Thomas Derrig (FF)	Seán Gibbons (FF)
9th	1937	Constituency abolished. See Kilkenny and Carlow–Kildare				

Dáil	Election	Deputy (Party)	Deputy (Party)	Deputy (Party)	Deputy (Party)	Deputy (Party)
13th	1948	James Pattison (NLP)	Thomas Walsh (FF)	Thomas Derrig (FF)	Joseph Hughes (FG)	Patrick Crotty (FG)
14th	1951	Francis Humphreys (FF)	Thomas Walsh (FF)	Thomas Derrig (FF)	Joseph Hughes (FG)	Patrick Crotty (FG)
15th	1954	James Pattison (Lab)	Thomas Walsh (FF)	Thomas Derrig (FF)	Joseph Hughes (FG)	Patrick Crotty (FG)
15th	1956 by-election	James Pattison (Lab)	Martin Medlar (FF)	Thomas Derrig (FF)	Joseph Hughes (FG)	Patrick Crotty (FG)
16th	1957	Francis Humphreys (FF)	Martin Medlar (FF)	Jim Gibbons (FF)	Joseph Hughes (FG)	Patrick Crotty (FG)
16th	1960 by-election	Patrick Teehan (FF)	Martin Medlar (FF)	Jim Gibbons (FF)	Joseph Hughes (FG)	Patrick Crotty (FG)
17th	1961	Séamus Pattison (Lab)	Martin Medlar (FF)	Jim Gibbons (FF)	Desmond Governey (FG)	Patrick Crotty (FG)
18th	1965	Séamus Pattison (Lab)	Tom Nolan (FF)	Jim Gibbons (FF)	Desmond Governey (FG)	Patrick Crotty (FG)
19th	1969	Séamus Pattison (Lab)	Tom Nolan (FF)	Jim Gibbons (FF)	Desmond Governey (FG)	Kieran Crotty (FG)
20th	1973	Séamus Pattison (Lab)	Tom Nolan (FF)	Jim Gibbons (FF)	Desmond Governey (FG)	Kieran Crotty (FG)
21st	1977	Séamus Pattison (Lab)	Tom Nolan (FF)	Jim Gibbons (FF)	Liam Aylward (FF)	Kieran Crotty (FG)
22nd	1981	Séamus Pattison (Lab)	Tom Nolan (FF)	Desmond Governey (FG)	Liam Aylward (FF)	Kieran Crotty (FG)
23rd	1982 (Feb)	Séamus Pattison (Lab)	Jim Gibbons (FF)	Desmond Governey (FG)	Liam Aylward (FF)	Kieran Crotty (FG)
24th	1982 (Nov)	Séamus Pattison (Lab)	M. J. Nolan (FF)	Dick Dowling (FG)	Liam Aylward (FF)	Kieran Crotty (FG)
25th	1987	Séamus Pattison (Lab)	M. J. Nolan (FF)	Martin Gibbons (PDs)	Liam Aylward (FF)	Kieran Crotty (FG)
26th	1989	Séamus Pattison (Lab)	M. J. Nolan (FF)	Phil Hogan (FG)	Liam Aylward (FF)	John Browne (FG)
27th	1992	Séamus Pattison (Lab)	M. J. Nolan (FF)	Phil Hogan (FG)	Liam Aylward (FF)	John Browne (FG)
28th	1997	Séamus Pattison (Lab)	John McGuinness (FF)	Phil Hogan (FG)	Liam Aylward (FF)	John Browne (FG)
29th	2002	Séamus Pattison (Lab)	John McGuinness (FF)	Phil Hogan (FG)	Liam Aylward (FF)	M. J. Nolan (FF)
30th	2007	Mary White (GP)	John McGuinness (FF)	Phil Hogan (FG)	Bobby Aylward (FF)	M. J. Nolan (FF)
31st	2011	Ann Phelan (Lab)	John McGuinness (FF)	Phil Hogan (FG)	John Paul Phelan (FG)	Pat Deering (FG)
31st	2015 by-election	Ann Phelan (Lab)	John McGuinness (FF)	Bobby Aylward (FF)	John Paul Phelan (FG)	Pat Deering (FG)
32nd	2016	Kathleen Funchion (SF)	John McGuinness (FF)	Bobby Aylward (FF)	John Paul Phelan (FG)	Pat Deering (FG)
33rd	2020	Kathleen Funchion (SF)	John McGuinness (FF)	Jennifer Murnane O'Connor (FF)	John Paul Phelan (FG)	Malcolm Noonan (GP)
34th	2024	Natasha Newsome Drennan (SF)	John McGuinness (FF)	Jennifer Murnane O'Connor (FF)	Catherine Callaghan (FG)	Peter "Chap" Cleere (FF)

Dáil	Election	Deputy (Party)	Deputy (Party)	Deputy (Party)	Deputy (Party)	Deputy (Party)	Deputy (Party)	Deputy (Party)	Deputy (Party)
2nd	1921	Michael Derham (SF)	George Gavan Duffy (SF)	Séamus Dwyer (SF)	Desmond FitzGerald (SF)	Frank Lawless (SF)	Margaret Pearse (SF)	6 seats 1921–1923	
3rd	1922	Michael Derham (PT-SF)	George Gavan Duffy (PT-SF)	Thomas Johnson (Lab)	Desmond FitzGerald (PT-SF)	Darrell Figgis (Ind)	John Rooney (FP)	6 seats 1921–1923	
4th	1923	Michael Derham (CnaG)	Bryan Cooper (Ind)	Thomas Johnson (Lab)	Desmond FitzGerald (CnaG)	Darrell Figgis (Ind)	John Good (Ind)	Kathleen Lynn (Rep)	Kevin O'Higgins (CnaG)
4th	1924 by-election	Batt O'Connor (CnaG)	Bryan Cooper (Ind)	Thomas Johnson (Lab)	Desmond FitzGerald (CnaG)	Darrell Figgis (Ind)	John Good (Ind)	Kathleen Lynn (Rep)	Kevin O'Higgins (CnaG)
4th	1926 by-election	Batt O'Connor (CnaG)	Bryan Cooper (Ind)	Thomas Johnson (Lab)	Desmond FitzGerald (CnaG)	William Norton (Lab)	John Good (Ind)	Kathleen Lynn (Rep)	Kevin O'Higgins (CnaG)
5th	1927 (Jun)	Batt O'Connor (CnaG)	Bryan Cooper (Ind)	Thomas Johnson (Lab)	Desmond FitzGerald (CnaG)	Patrick Belton (FF)	John Good (Ind)	Seán MacEntee (FF)	Kevin O'Higgins (CnaG)
5th	1927 by-election	Batt O'Connor (CnaG)	Bryan Cooper (Ind)	Thomas Johnson (Lab)	Desmond FitzGerald (CnaG)	Patrick Belton (FF)	John Good (Ind)	Seán MacEntee (FF)	Gearóid O'Sullivan (CnaG)
6th	1927 (Sep)	Batt O'Connor (CnaG)	Bryan Cooper (CnaG)	Joseph Murphy (Ind)	Desmond FitzGerald (CnaG)	Seán Brady (FF)	John Good (Ind)	Seán MacEntee (FF)	Gearóid O'Sullivan (CnaG)
6th	1930 by-election	Batt O'Connor (CnaG)	Thomas Finlay (CnaG)	Joseph Murphy (Ind)	Desmond FitzGerald (CnaG)	Seán Brady (FF)	John Good (Ind)	Seán MacEntee (FF)	Gearóid O'Sullivan (CnaG)
7th	1932	Batt O'Connor (CnaG)	Thomas Finlay (CnaG)	Patrick Curran (Lab)	Henry Dockrell (CnaG)	Seán Brady (FF)	John Good (Ind)	Seán MacEntee (FF)	Gearóid O'Sullivan (CnaG)
8th	1933	Batt O'Connor (CnaG)	John A. Costello (CnaG)	Margaret Mary Pearse (FF)	Henry Dockrell (CnaG)	Seán Brady (FF)	John Good (Ind)	Seán MacEntee (FF)	Gearóid O'Sullivan (CnaG)
8th	1935 by-election	Cecil Lavery (FG)	John A. Costello (CnaG)	Margaret Mary Pearse (FF)	Henry Dockrell (CnaG)	Seán Brady (FF)	John Good (Ind)	Seán MacEntee (FF)	Gearóid O'Sullivan (CnaG)
9th	1937	Cecil Lavery (FG)	Henry Dockrell (FG)	Gerrard McGowan (Lab)	Patrick Fogarty (FF)	Seán Brady (FF)	5 seats 1937–1948		
10th	1938	Patrick Belton (FG)	Henry Dockrell (FG)	Thomas Mullen (FF)	Patrick Fogarty (FF)	Seán Brady (FF)	5 seats 1937–1948		
11th	1943	Liam Cosgrave (FG)	Henry Dockrell (FG)	James Tunney (Lab)	Patrick Fogarty (FF)	Seán Brady (FF)	5 seats 1937–1948		
12th	1944	Liam Cosgrave (FG)	Henry Dockrell (FG)	Patrick Burke (FF)	Patrick Fogarty (FF)	Seán Brady (FF)	5 seats 1937–1948		
12th	1947 by-election	Liam Cosgrave (FG)	Henry Dockrell (FG)	Patrick Burke (FF)	Seán MacBride (CnaP)	Seán Brady (FF)	5 seats 1937–1948		
13th	1948	Éamon Rooney (FG)	Seán Dunne (Lab)	Patrick Burke (FF)	3 seats 1948–1961				
14th	1951	Éamon Rooney (FG)	Seán Dunne (Lab)	Patrick Burke (FF)	3 seats 1948–1961				
15th	1954	Éamon Rooney (FG)	Seán Dunne (Lab)	Patrick Burke (FF)	3 seats 1948–1961				
16th	1957	Éamon Rooney (FG)	Kevin Boland (FF)	Patrick Burke (FF)	3 seats 1948–1961				
17th	1961	Éamon Rooney (FG)	Kevin Boland (FF)	Patrick Burke (FF)	Mark Clinton (FG)	Seán Dunne (Ind)	5 seats 1961–1969		
18th	1965	Des Foley (FF)	Kevin Boland (FF)	Patrick Burke (FF)	Mark Clinton (FG)	Seán Dunne (Lab)	5 seats 1961–1969		
19th	1969	Constituency abolished. See Dublin County North and Dublin County South							
