= Minister for Publicity =

Former Irish government cabinet minister

The minister for publicity was a position in the Ministry of Dáil Éireann, the government of the Irish Republic, a self-declared state which was established in 1919 by Dáil Éireann, the parliamentary assembly made up of the majority of Irish MPs elected in the 1918 general election.

== History ==
In April 1918, a Sinn Féin Department of Propaganda was established at No. 6 Harcourt Street in charge of Robert Brennan. The portfolio was created to promote the new government of Ireland throughout the country. After the First Dáil came into being a similar department was set up under the new Dáil, concentrating more on overseas publicity. Both Departments co-operated in issuing publicity material. The first Director of Publicity under Dáil Éireann was Laurence Ginnell.

In the First Dáil, the post was called Director of Propaganda.

== List of office-holders ==
=== Director of Propaganda 1919–1921 ===
Name	Term of office		Party	Dáil Ministry
Laurence Ginnell	1 April 1919	17 June 1919	Sinn Féin	2nd DM
Desmond FitzGerald (Note: Desmond FitzGerald acted as substitute Director of Propaganda while Laurence Ginnell was imprisoned.)	17 June 1919	11 February 1921	Sinn Féin	2nd DM
Erskine Childers (Note: Erskine Childers acted as substitute Director of Propaganda while Desmond FitzGerald was imprisoned.)	12 February 1921	8 March 1921	Sinn Féin	2nd DM
=== Minister for Publicity 1921–1922 ===
Name	Term of office		Party	Dáil Ministry
Desmond FitzGerald	26 August 1921	9 September 1922	Sinn Féin	3rd DM • 4th DM
