= Economic and Social Research Institute =

Research institute in Dublin, Ireland

- Type: Limited company
- Genre: Economic and Social Research
- Founded: 1960
- Headquarters: Whitaker Square, Sir John Rogerson's Quay, Dublin 2, Ireland
- Area served: Ireland
- Key people: Sean O'Driscoll, Chairman; Martina Lawless, Director
- Products: Economic and Social Research that informs Public Policymaking and Civil Society
- Revenue: €10.9 million (2019)
- Total assets: 16,410,656 euro (2023)
- Number of employees: 91 (2019)
- Website: esri.ie

The Economic and Social Research Institute (Institiúid Taighde Eacnamaíochta agus Sóisialta in Irish) is an Irish research institute founded in 1960 to provide evidence-based research used to inform public policy debate and decision-making. The research of the institute focuses on the areas of sustainable economic growth and social progress. Martina Lawless is the Director of the institute.

== History ==
The institute was founded in 1960 by a group of senior academics and public servants, led by T. K. Whitaker, Secretary of the Department of Finance. While conducting an economic study of Ireland, Whitaker became aware of the necessity for an independent research organisation to conduct analysis of data using up-to-date quantitative techniques in order to make the data useful for public policy makers. The US-based Ford Foundation provided seed funding to establish the Economic Research Institute in 1960. In 1966 the remit of the institute was expanded to include social research and the name changed to Economic and Social Research Institute. The first Director of the institute was Roy C. Geary, Irish statistician and founder of the Central Statistics Office.

== Mission of the institute and fields of study ==
The mission of the institute is to produce economic and social research that informs public policymaking and civil society, in order to achieve its vision of "Informed policy for a better Ireland". The institute makes significant contributions across its 12 designated areas of research: macroeconomics; internationalisation and competitiveness; energy and environment; communications and transport; labour markets and skills; migration, integration and demography; education; taxation, welfare and pensions; social inclusion and equality; health and quality of life; children and young people; and behavioural economics.

Since 2006, the institute has conducted the research for Growing Up in Ireland, a national longitudinal study of children and youth, funded by the Department of Children and Youth Affairs. The most significant study of its kind ever to take place in Ireland, the purpose is to examine how children in Ireland are developing in the current social, economic and cultural environment. The second phase of this study began in 2015 and is conducted in conjunction with researchers from Trinity College Dublin.

The Economic and Social Research Institute and Trinity College Dublin agreed to a strategic partnership in July 2010. The agreement enables both institutions to build collaborative and complementary strengths in the social sciences.

The ESRI has been noted for its strength in quantitative research methods. It is listed by IDEAS/RePEc among the top 20 economic think tanks in the world.

== Publications ==
The institute's research is disseminated through ESRI publications, academic journals, books and government reports. The institute has a number of regular publications, including the following:

· The Quarterly Economic Commentary provides analysis of current economic trends and macroeconomic forecasts for the current and following year.

· Ireland's Economic Outlook provides a medium-term macroeconomic outlook for Ireland.

· Research Bulletins provide shorter, accessible summaries of work already published by ESRI researchers.

The majority of the ESRI's own publications are available for download free of charge from the institute's website.

== Governance of the institute ==
The Economic and Social Research Institute is a company limited by guarantee, incorporated in 1960. It is a not-for-profit organisation registered as a charity. The institute is answerable to more than 300 members, comprising both individuals and companies.

The institute is governed by a Council of up to 14 members, including the Director. The Council members are drawn from a cross-section of the institute's members, from academia, civil service, state agencies, business and civil society. Additionally, there is a Forum of more than 30 members representing a broad range of stakeholders, who are consulted in relation to the institute's strategic development.

The ESRI is audited by the Comptroller & Auditor General and is subject to the rules that apply to state organisations in relation to prompt payments, disclosure, risk management and tax clearance. Since 1 May 2013, the institute has been subject to oversight by the Office of the Ombudsman.

== Funding ==
The institute receives an annual government grant-in-aid to support the public good elements of the institute's activities. Other funding comes from:

- Major research programme agreements with government departments and state agencies
- Specific research projects commissioned by government departments, state agencies and international bodies such as the European Commission
- Membership subscriptions
- Sale of publications
- Sponsorship by Irish business

== See also ==
- Central Bank of Ireland
- John D. FitzGerald
- Irish Fiscal Advisory Council

== Sources ==
• Conniffe, D. (ed). Roy Geary, 1896–1983, Irish Statistician, Centenary Lecture by John E. Spencer and Associated Papers. 1997. Oak Tree Press. Dublin.
• Conway, B. 2006. 'Foreigners, faith and fatherland: the historical origins, development and present status of Irish sociology'. Sociological Origins – special supplement. Fall 2006.
• Jackson, J. 2004. 'Research policy and practice in Ireland: A historical perspective'. In M. MacLachlan & M. Caball (eds) Social science in the knowledge society: Research policy in Ireland. Liffey Press. Dublin.
• Murray, P. 2009. ‘Shaping Social Science Research’. Facilitating the Future? US Aid, European Integration and Irish Industrial Viability, 1948–73. UCD Press. Dublin.
• Ruane, F. and Whelan, B.2010–2011. "Building Research Capacity in the Social Sciences – Alternatives Approaches", Journal of the Statistical and Social Inquiry Society of Ireland, Vol. 40. pp133–151.
• Tovey, H. & Share, P. 2003. A sociology of Ireland. Gill and Macmillan. Dublin.
