= Government of the 6th Dáil =

Governments of the Irish Free State from 1927 to 1932

There were two governments of the 6th Dáil. The 4th executive council of the Irish Free State (11 October 1927 – 2 April 1930) was formed after the September 1927 general election to the 6th Dáil held on 15 September 1927. The 4th executive council lasted for 2 years, 168 days from its appointment until it resigned from office, and continued to carry out its duties until the appointment of its successor for a further 5 days, for a total of 2 years, 173 days. The 5th executive council of the Irish Free State (2 April 1930 – 9 March 1932) was formed after the executive council resigned in a Dáil defeat. It lasted for 1 year, 342 days. Both minority governments of Cumann na nGaedheal led by W. T. Cosgrave as President of the Executive Council and had the same composition in personnel.

== 4th executive council of the Irish Free State ==
4th executive council of the Irish Free State
- Executive Council of the Irish Free State
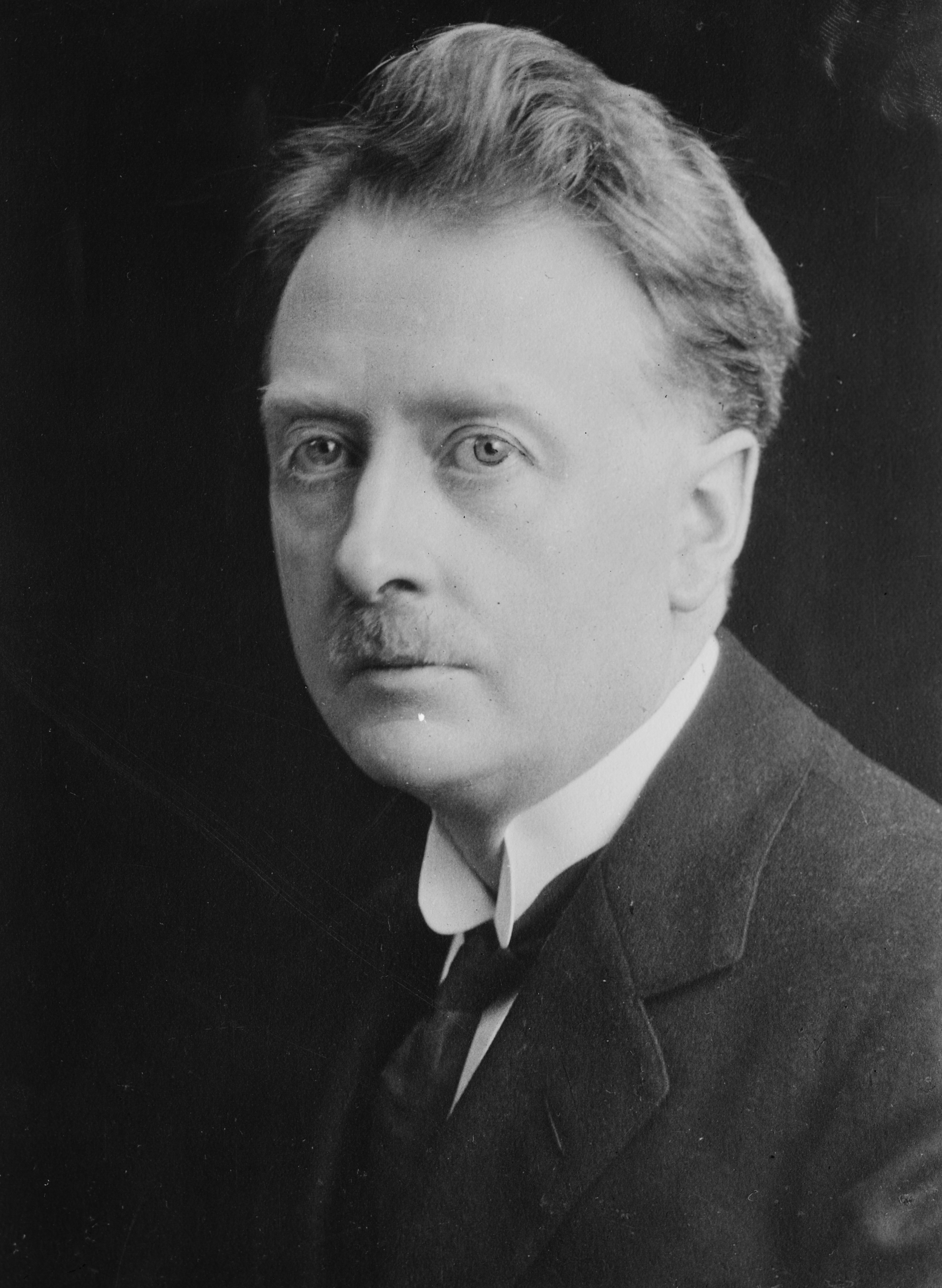
- Date formed: 11 October 1927
- Date dissolved: 2 April 1930

People and organisations
- King: George V
- Governor-General: Tim Healy (Oct. 1927 – Jan. 1928); James McNeill (Jan. 1928 – Apr. 1930)
- President of the Executive Council: W. T. Cosgrave
- Vice-President of the Executive Council: Ernest Blythe
- Total no. of members: 9
- Member party: Cumann na nGaedheal
- Status in legislature: Minority government
- Opposition party: Fianna Fáil
- Opposition leader: Éamon de Valera

History
- Election: September 1927 general election
- Legislature terms: 6th Dáil; 1st Seanad (1925–1928); 1st Seanad (1928–1931)
- Predecessor: 3rd executive council
- Successor: 5th executive council

=== Nomination of President of the Executive Council ===
The 6th Dáil first met on 11 October 1927. In the debate on the nomination of the President of the Executive Council, Cumann na nGaedheal leader and outgoing President W. T. Cosgrave was proposed, and this resolution was carried with 76 votes in favour and 70 against. Cosgrave was then appointed as President of the Executive Council by Governor-General Tim Healy.

11 October 1927; Nomination of W. T. Cosgrave (CnaG) as President of the Executive Council; Motion proposed by Gearóid O'Sullivan and seconded by Peadar Doyle; Absolute majority: 77/153
| Vote | Parties | Votes |
| Yes | Cumann na nGaedheal (60), Farmers' Party (6), Independents (10) | 76 / 153 |
| No | Fianna Fáil (57), Labour Party (13) | 70 / 153 |
| Absent or Not voting | National League Party (2), Independents (2), Ceann Comhairle (1) | 5 / 153 |
| Vacancy | 1 | 1 / 153 |

=== Members of the Executive Council ===
The members of the Executive Council were nominated by the President and approved by the Dáil on 12 October. They were then appointed by the Governor General.

| Office | Name |
|---|---|
| President of the Executive Council | W. T. Cosgrave |
| Vice-President of the Executive Council | Ernest Blythe |
| Minister for Finance | Ernest Blythe |
| Minister for Posts and Telegraphs | Ernest Blythe |
| Minister for Defence | Desmond FitzGerald |
| Minister for Education | John M. O'Sullivan |
| Minister for Industry and Commerce | Patrick McGilligan |
| Minister for External Affairs | Patrick McGilligan |
| Minister for Agriculture and Lands (Note: The Minister for Agriculture and Lands was renamed as Minister for Agriculture on 1 September 1928.) | Patrick Hogan |
| Minister for Fisheries (Note: The Minister for Fisheries was renamed as Minister for Lands and Fisheries on 1 September 1928.) | Fionán Lynch |
| Minister for Local Government and Public Health | Richard Mulcahy |
| Minister for Justice | James FitzGerald-Kenney |

=== Parliamentary secretaries ===
On 13 March 1927, the Executive Council appointed Parliamentary secretaries on the nomination of the President.

| Name | Office | Party |
|---|---|---|
| Eamonn Duggan | Government Chief Whip | Cumann na nGaedheal |
| Eamonn Duggan | Parliamentary secretary to the Minister for Defence | Cumann na nGaedheal |
| Séamus Burke | Parliamentary secretary to the Minister for Finance | Cumann na nGaedheal |
| Michael Heffernan | Parliamentary secretary to the Minister for Posts and Telegraphs | Farmers' Party |
| Martin Roddy | Parliamentary secretary to the Minister for Lands and Fisheries | Cumann na nGaedheal |
| James Dolan | Parliamentary secretary to the Minister for Industry and Commerce | Cumann na nGaedheal |

=== Amendments to the Constitution of the Irish Free State ===
The following amendments to the Constitution of the Irish Free State were proposed by the Executive Council and passed by the Oireachtas:

- Amendment No. 10 (12 July 1928): Removed all direct democracy provisions except the requirement that, after a transitional period, a referendum be held on all constitutional amendments. However this remaining provision would never be allowed to come into effect.
- Amendment No. 6 (23 July 1928): Replaced the direct election of the Senate with a system of indirect election.
- Amendment No. 13 (23 July 1928): Extended the Senate's power of delay over legislation from nine months to twenty months.
- Amendment No. 8 (25 October 1928): Reduced the age of eligibility for senators from 35 to 30.
- Amendment No. 9 (25 October 1928): Altered provisions relating to the procedure for nominating candidates to stand in senatorial elections.
- Amendment No. 7 (30 October 1928): Reduced the term of office of senators from twelve to nine years.
- Amendment No. 14 (14 May 1929): Clarified a technical matter relating to the relationship between the two houses of the Oireachtas.
- Amendment No. 15 (14 May 1929): Permitted one member of the Executive Council to be a senator, where previously it had been required that all be members of the Dáil. It was still required that the President, vice-president and Minister for Finance hold seats in the Dáil.
- Amendment No. 16 (14 May 1929): Extended the period during which amendments of the constitution could be made by ordinary legislation from eight to sixteen years.
- Amendment No. 11 (17 December 1929): Altered the method for filling casual vacancies in the Seanad by providing for a vote of both houses rather than just the Seanad.
- Amendment No. 12 (24 March 1930): Altered provisions relating to the Committee of Privileges that had authority to resolves disputes over the definition of a money bill.

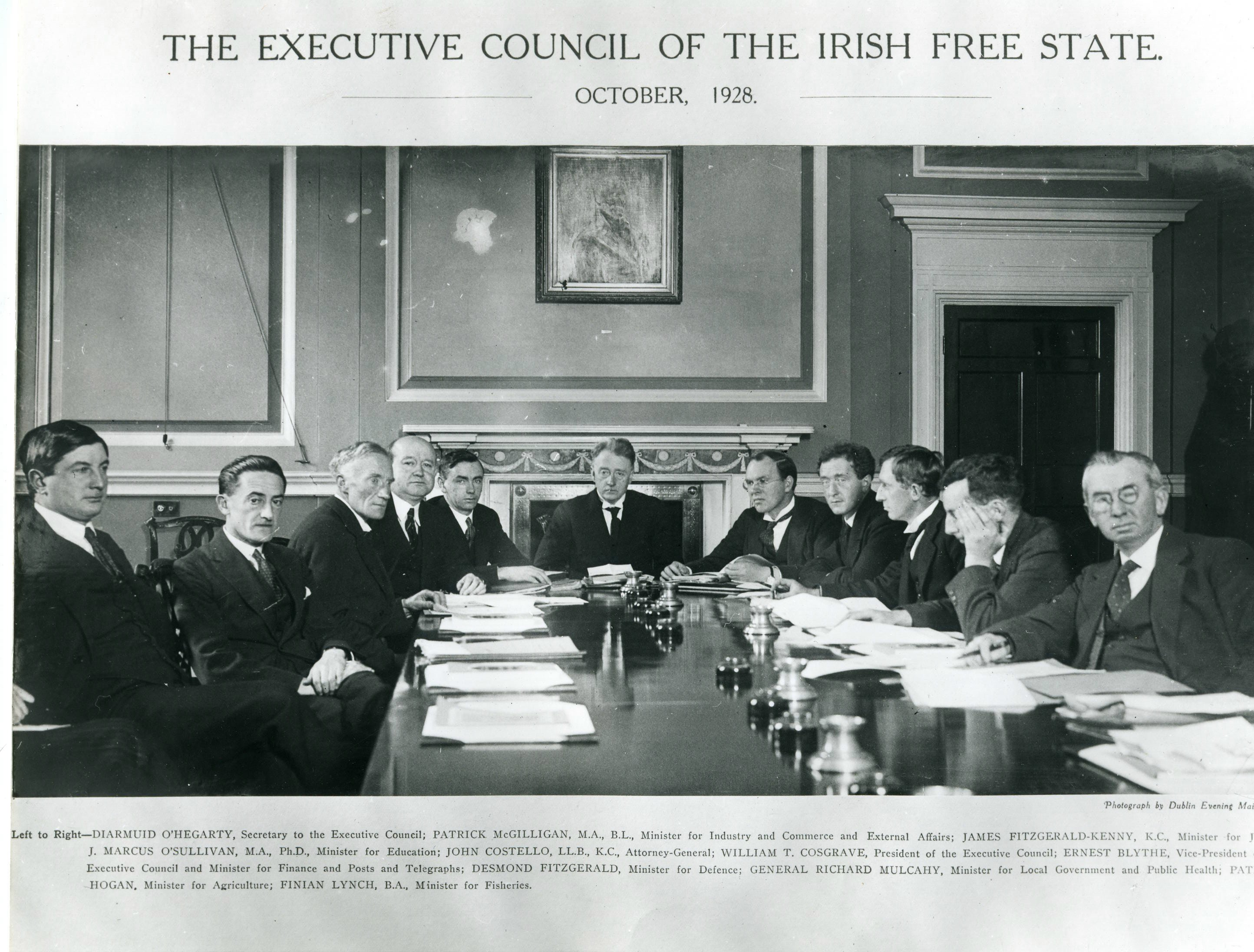
Executive Council of the Irish Free State – October 1928.L–R: Diarmuid O'Hegarty, Patrick McGilligan, James FitzGerald-Kenney, John M. O'Sullivan, John A. Costello, W. T. Cosgrave, Ernest Blythe, Desmond FitzGerald, Richard Mulcahy, Patrick Hogan and Fionán Lynch.

=== Resignation of the Executive Council ===
On 27 March 1930, the Old Age Pensions Bill 1929, a private member's bill proposed by Conn Ward a member of Fianna Fáil, which was the lead party of the parliamentary opposition, passed second stage by 66 votes to 64. This occurred in part due to absences from the government benches, including Séamus Burke, Parliamentary Secretary to the Minister for Finance, as well as Independent TDs who regularly supported the government.

The following day, the President tendered his resignation to the Governor-General. The Executive Council continued to carry out its duties under Article 53 of the Constitution until the appointment of its successor.

== 5th executive council of the Irish Free State ==
5th executive council of the Irish Free State
- Executive Council of the Irish Free State
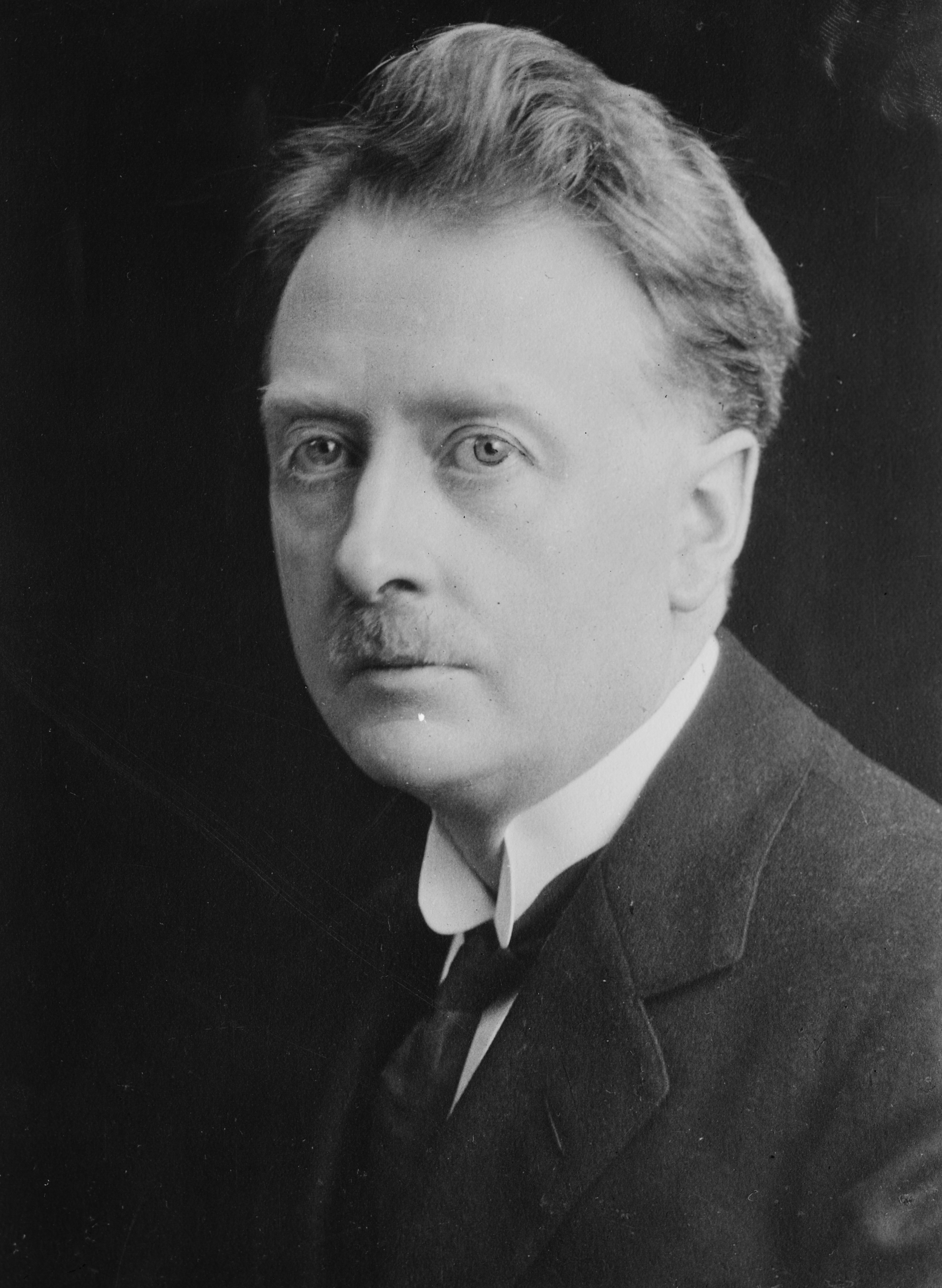
- Date formed: 2 April 1930
- Date dissolved: 9 March 1932

People and organisations
- King: George V
- Governor-General: James McNeill
- President of the Executive Council: W. T. Cosgrave
- Vice-President of the Executive Council: Ernest Blythe
- Total no. of members: 9
- Member party: Cumann na nGaedheal
- Status in legislature: Minority government
- Opposition party: Fianna Fáil
- Opposition leader: Éamon de Valera

History
- Legislature terms: 6th Dáil; 1st Seanad (1928–1931); 1st Seanad (1931–1934)
- Predecessor: 4th executive council
- Successor: 6th executive council

=== Nomination of President of the Executive Council ===
In the debate on the nomination of the President of the Executive Council on 2 April 1930, Fianna Fáil leader Éamon de Valera, Labour Party Leader Thomas J. O'Connell, and Cumann na nGaedheal leader and outgoing President W. T. Cosgrave were each proposed. The motions proposing de Valera and O'Connell were defeated, while the motion proposing Cosgrave was carried with 80 votes in favour to 65 votes against. Cosgrave was then appointed as President of the Executive Council by Governor-General James McNeill.

2 April 1930; Nomination of W. T. Cosgrave (CnaG) as President of the Executive Council; Motion proposed by Joseph Mongan and seconded by Michael Davis; Absolute majority: 77/153
| Vote | Parties | Votes |
| Yes | Cumann na nGaedheal (62), Farmers' Party (6), National League Party (2), Independents (10) | 80 / 153 |
| No | Fianna Fáil (54), Labour Party (11) | 65 / 153 |
| Absent or Not voting | Fianna Fáil (3), Labour Party (2), Independent (1), Ceann Comhairle (1) | 7 / 153 |

=== Members of the Executive Council ===
The members of the Executive Council were nominated by the President and approved by the Dáil on 3 April. They were then appointed by the Governor General.

| Office | Name |
|---|---|
| President of the Executive Council | W. T. Cosgrave |
| Vice-President of the Executive Council | Ernest Blythe |
| Minister for Finance | Ernest Blythe |
| Minister for Posts and Telegraphs | Ernest Blythe |
| Minister for Defence | Desmond FitzGerald |
| Minister for Education | John M. O'Sullivan |
| Minister for Industry and Commerce | Patrick McGilligan |
| Minister for External Affairs | Patrick McGilligan |
| Minister for Agriculture | Patrick Hogan |
| Minister for Lands and Fisheries | Fionán Lynch |
| Minister for Local Government and Public Health | Richard Mulcahy |
| Minister for Justice | James FitzGerald-Kenney |

=== Parliamentary secretaries ===
On 3 April 1930, the Executive Council appointed Parliamentary secretaries on the nomination of the President.

| Name | Office | Party |
|---|---|---|
| Eamonn Duggan | Government Chief Whip | Cumann na nGaedheal |
| Eamonn Duggan | Parliamentary secretary to the Minister for Defence | Cumann na nGaedheal |
| Séamus Burke | Parliamentary secretary to the Minister for Finance | Cumann na nGaedheal |
| Michael Heffernan | Parliamentary secretary to the Minister for Posts and Telegraphs | Farmers' Party |
| Martin Roddy | Parliamentary secretary to the Minister for Lands and Fisheries | Cumann na nGaedheal |
| James Dolan | Parliamentary secretary to the Minister for Industry and Commerce | Cumann na nGaedheal |

=== Amendment to the Constitution of the Irish Free State ===
The following amendment to the Constitution of the Irish Free State was proposed by the Executive Council and passed by the Oireachtas:

- Amendment No. 17 (17 October 1931): Inserted Article 2A, which included provisions for trial by military tribunals.

=== External relations ===
The Statute of Westminster 1931 removed the power of the Parliament of the United Kingdom to pass laws affecting British Dominions, including the Irish Free State.

== See also ==
- Dáil Éireann
- Government of Ireland
- Constitution of the Irish Free State
- Politics of the Republic of Ireland
