= Timothy Sullivan (Irish judge) =

Irish judge (1874–1949)

Chief Justice of Ireland
- In office 1 December 1936 – 1 June 1946
- Nominated by: Government of Ireland
- Appointed by: Douglas Hyde
- Preceded by: Hugh Kennedy
- Succeeded by: Conor Maguire

Judge of the Supreme Court
- In office 12 May 1924 – 1 June 1946
- Nominated by: Government of Ireland
- Appointed by: Tim Healy

President of the High Court
- In office 14 February 1924 – 1 December 1936
- Nominated by: Government of Ireland
- Appointed by: Tim Healy
- Preceded by: New office
- Succeeded by: Conor Maguire

Judge of the High Court
- In office 10 February 1924 – 1 December 1936
- Nominated by: Government of Ireland
- Appointed by: Tim Healy

Personal details
- Born: 25 August 1874 Phibsborough, Dublin, Ireland
- Died: 12 May 1949 (aged 74) Foxrock, Dublin, Ireland
- Resting place: Glasnevin Cemetery, Dublin, Ireland
- Party: Fine Gael
- Spouse: Maeve Healy (m. 1913)
- Parent: Timothy Daniel Sullivan (father)
- Relatives: Maurice Healy (cousin)
- Education: Belvedere College; University of Galway; King's Inns

Timothy Michael Sullivan (25 August 1874 – 12 May 1949) was an Irish judge who served as Chief Justice of Ireland from 1936 to 1946, a Judge of the Supreme Court from 1924 to 1946, President of the High Court and a Judge of the High Court from 1924 to 1936.

He was born in Dublin in 1874, the third surviving son among 17 children of Timothy Daniel Sullivan, a prominent Home Rule Party MP and Lord Mayor of Dublin and his wife Catherine Healy. He attended Belvedere College.

Through his sister Anne, who married Dr. Thomas Higgins, he was the uncle of Kevin O'Higgins and great-uncle of another Chief Justice, Tom O'Higgins. His mother was a sister of Tim Healy, the first Governor-General of the Irish Free State, and Sullivan in turn married their daughter Maeve.

He was called to the Bar in 1895.

In 1913, Sullivan married his niece Maev Healy, daughter of his sister Erina Catherine Sullivan and her husband Tim Healy. Maev was an artist who painted the well-known portrait of her husband in his judicial robes. They had no children. His strongly nationalist background made him acceptable to the new Government of the Irish Free State as a member of the new judiciary and accordingly, in 1924, he was appointed President of the High Court; in 1936, on the death of Hugh Kennedy, he was appointed Chief Justice of Ireland and served until he reached retirement age in 1946.

His most notable judgment was the upholding by the Supreme Court in 1940 of the constitutionality of the Offences Against the State (Amendment) Bill which allowed for indefinite detention of suspected IRA members. A casual remark of Sullivan that he was giving judgment "for the majority" caused controversy and led to the Second Amendment of the Constitution of Ireland 1941 providing for a single judgment only in such cases. There was further controversy in the 1960s when an academic claimed that Sullivan had "packed" the Court in favour of the Government by persuading James Creed Meredith to step down in favour of Conor Maguire. The claim seems to be unfounded: Sullivan was a firm believer in judicial independence, and in any case, by 1940 any political sympathies he had were with the Opposition, not the Government.

His cousin Maurice Healy in his celebrated memoir The Old Munster Circuit portrays Timothy as a kindly, serious young man; Mr Justice MacKenzie in his memoir Lawful Occasions recalled the much older Sullivan, then Chief Justice, as "an old-fashioned Irish gentleman, quiet living".

Legal offices
Preceded by Hugh Kennedy	Chief Justice of Ireland; 1936–1946	Succeeded by Conor Maguire
