= Government of the 4th Dáil =

Government of the Irish Free State 1923 to 1927

2nd executive council of the Irish Free State
- Executive Council of the Irish Free State
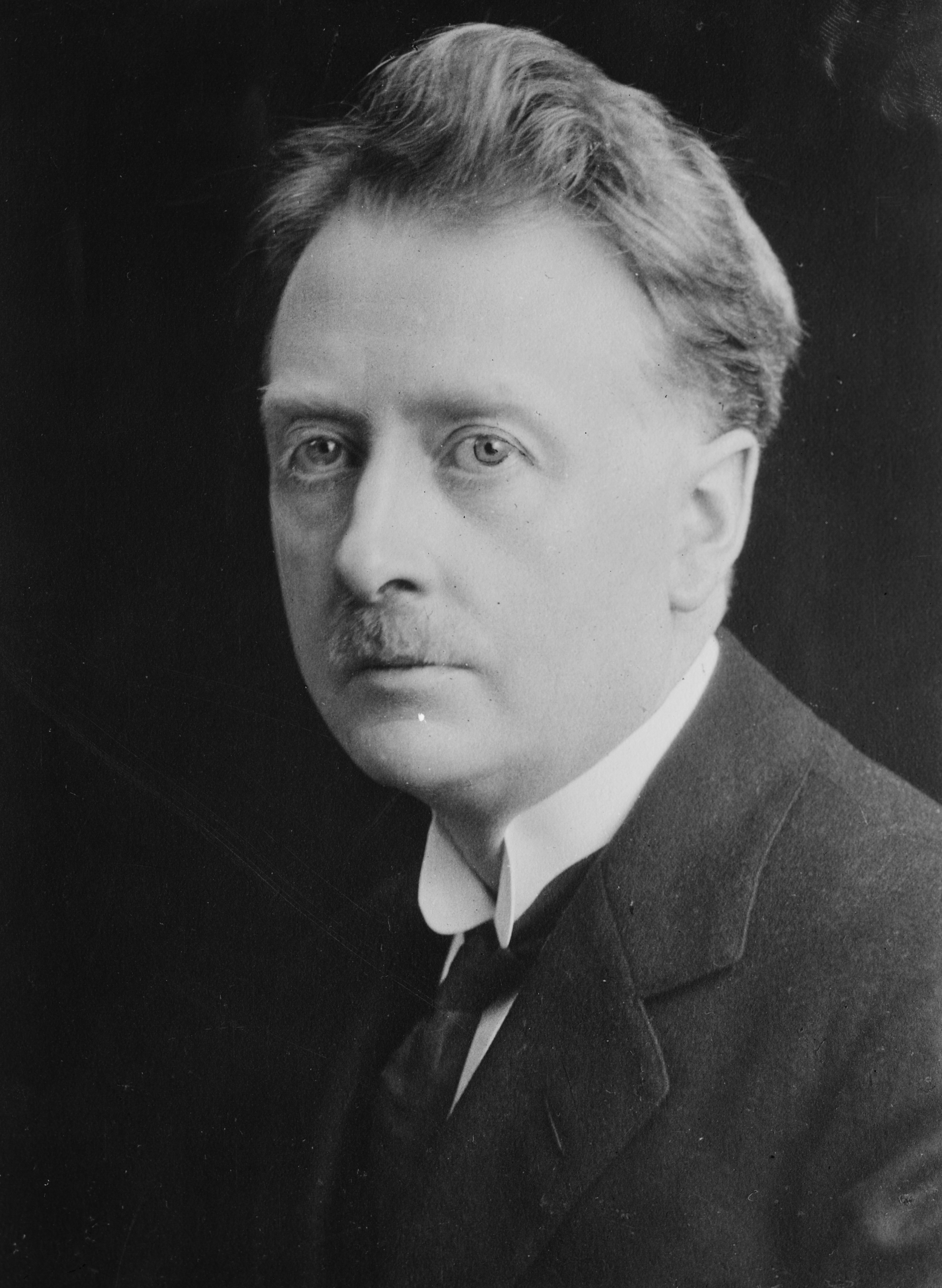
- Date formed: 19 September 1923
- Date dissolved: 23 June 1927

People and organisations
- King: George V
- Governor-General: Tim Healy
- President of the Executive Council: W. T. Cosgrave
- Vice-President of the Executive Council: Kevin O'Higgins
- Total no. of members: 11 (inc. 4 non-members of the Executive Council)
- Member party: Cumann na nGaedheal
- Status in legislature: Minority government
- Opposition party: Labour Party
- Opposition leader: Thomas Johnson

History
- Election: 1923 general election
- Legislature terms: 4th Dáil; 1st Seanad (1922–1925); 1st Seanad (1925–1928)
- Predecessor: 1st executive council
- Successor: 3rd executive council

The 2nd executive council of the Irish Free State (19 September 1923 – 23 June 1927) was formed after the general election to the 4th Dáil held on 27 August 1923. It was a minority Cumann na nGaedheal government led by W. T. Cosgrave as President of the Executive Council. It lasted 3 years, 277 days.

== President of the Executive Council ==
The 4th Dáil first met on 19 September 1923. The nomination of W. T. Cosgrave as President of the Executive Council was proposed by Richard Mulcahy and seconded by William Magennis. It was approved by the Dáil and Cosgrave was re-appointed by the governor-general.

== Members of the Executive Council ==
The members of the Executive Council were proposed by the president and approved by the Dáil on 20 September 1923.

Office	Name
President of the Executive Council	W. T. Cosgrave
Vice-President of the Executive Council	Kevin O'Higgins
Minister for Home Affairs	Kevin O'Higgins
Minister for Defence	Richard Mulcahy
Minister for Education	Eoin MacNeill
Minister for External Affairs	Desmond FitzGerald
Minister for Finance	Ernest Blythe
Minister for Industry and Commerce	Joseph McGrath
=== Change on 20 March 1924 === Richard Mulcahy resigned after criticism by the Executive Council of his handling of the Army Mutiny.
Office	Name
Minister for Defence	W. T. Cosgrave (acting)
=== Change on 4 April 1924 === Joseph McGrath resigned on 7 March 1924 because of dissatisfaction with government attitude to IRAO army officers.
Office	Name
Minister for Industry and Commerce	Patrick McGilligan
=== Change on 21 November 1924 === Permanent Minister for Defence.
Office	Name
Minister for Defence	Peter Hughes
=== Change on 28 January 1926 === Eoin MacNeill resigned in November 1925 after a leak of the report of the Irish Boundary Commission was published in a newspaper. MacNeill had represented the Free State on the commission.
Office	Name
Minister for Education	John M. O'Sullivan

=== Ministers not members of the Executive Council ===
Extern Ministers were appointed by the Dáil on 10 October.

Office	Name
Minister for Agriculture	Patrick Hogan
Minister for Fisheries	Fionán Lynch
Minister for Local Government	Séamus Burke
Postmaster-General	J. J. Walsh

== Parliamentary secretaries ==
The Executive Council appointed Parliamentary secretaries, with Daniel McCarthy continuing as Chief Whip from the beginning of the term.

Name	Office	Term
Daniel McCarthy	Government Chief Whip	1922–1924
=== Appointment 21 April 1924 ===
Name	Office	Term
Eamonn Duggan	Parliamentary secretary to the Executive Council	1924–1926
=== Appointment 1 December 1924 ===
Name	Office	Term
John M. O'Sullivan	Parliamentary secretary to the Minister for Finance	1924–1926
=== Change 19 June 1924 === Following the resignation of Daniel McCarthy from the Dáil.
Name	Office	Term
James Dolan	Government Chief Whip	1924–1927
=== Appointment 15 January 1925 ===
Name	Office	Term
George Nicolls	Parliamentary secretary to the Minister for Defence	1925–1927
=== Change 10 May 1926 === Following the appointment of John O'Sullivan to the Executive Council in January.
Name	Office	Term
Eamonn Duggan	Parliamentary secretary to the Minister for Finance	1926–1927

== Ministers and Secretaries Act 1924 ==
The Ministers and Secretaries Act 1924 came into effect on 2 June 1924. On this date, the following ministerial titles were renamed:

Old title	New title
Minister for Home Affairs	Minister for Justice
Minister for Local Government	Minister for Local Government and Public Health
Minister for Agriculture	Minister for Lands and Agriculture
Postmaster-General	Minister for Posts and Telegraphs

== Amendments to the Constitution of the Irish Free State ==
The following amendments to the Constitution of the Irish Free State were proposed by the Executive Council and passed by the Oireachtas:

- Amendment No. 1 (11 July 1925): Provided that the first Senators would vacate office in December 1925, made changes relating to the terms of office of senators, and the date on which Seanad elections were to be held.
- Amendment No. 3 (4 March 1927): Removed the requirement that the day of any general election would be declared a public holiday.
- Amendment No. 4 (4 March 1927): Extended the maximum term of the Dáil from four to six years.
- Amendment No. 2 (19 March 1927): Introduced a system of automatic re-election of the Ceann Comhairle in a general election.
- Amendment No. 5 (5 May 1927): Increased the maximum membership of the Executive Council from seven to twelve members.
