= Government of the 8th Dáil =

Government of the Irish Free State from 1933 to 1937

7th executive council of the Irish Free State
- Executive Council of the Irish Free State
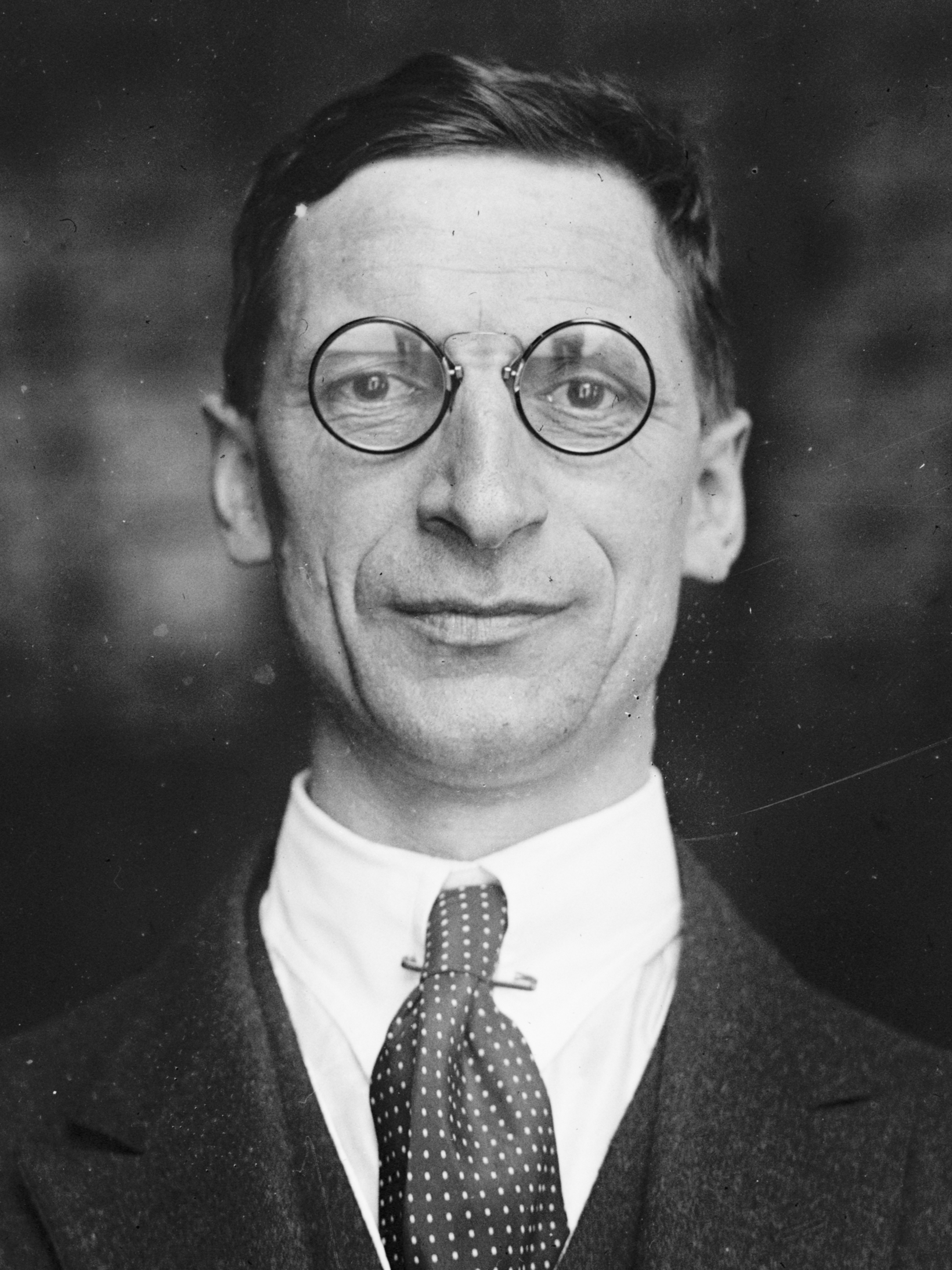
- Date formed: 8 February 1933
- Date dissolved: 21 July 1937

People and organisations
- King: George V (1933–1936); Edward VIII (Jan.–Dec. 1936)
- Governor-General: Domhnall Ua Buachalla (until 11 Dec. 1936)
- President of the Executive Council: Éamon de Valera
- Vice-President of the Executive Council: Seán T. O'Kelly
- Total no. of members: 10
- Member party: Fianna Fáil
- Status in legislature: Minority government
- Opposition party: Cumann na nGaedheal
- Opposition leader: W. T. Cosgrave

History
- Election: 1933 general election
- Legislature terms: 8th Dáil; 1st Seanad (1931–1934); 1st Seanad (1934–1936)
- Predecessor: 6th executive council
- Successor: 8th executive council

The 7th executive council of the Irish Free State (8 February 1933 – 21 July 1937) was the Executive Council formed after the general election to the 8th Dáil held on 24 January 1933. It was led by Fianna Fáil leader Éamon de Valera as President of the Executive Council, who had first taken office in the Irish Free State after the 1932 general election. It lasted for 4 years, 163 days.

== Nomination of President of the Executive Council ==
The 8th Dáil first met on 8 February. In the debate on the nomination of the President of the Executive Council, Fianna Fáil leader and outgoing President Éamon de Valera was proposed, and the motion was approved by 82 votes to 54. He was then appointed as president by Governor-General Domhnall Ua Buachalla.

8 February 1933; Nomination of Éamon de Valera (FF) as President of the Executive Council; Motion proposed by Seán Moylan and seconded by Micheál Clery; Absolute majority: 77/153
Vote	Parties	Votes
Yes	Fianna Fáil (74), Labour Party (8)	82 / 153
No	Cumann na nGaedheal (45), Independents (9)	54 / 153
Absent or Not voting	National Centre Party (11), Cumann na nGaedheal (3), Fianna Fáil (2), Ceann Comhairle (1)	17 / 153

== Members of the Executive Council ==
The members of the Executive Council were proposed by the President and approved by the Dáil. They were appointed by the Governor-General on the same day.

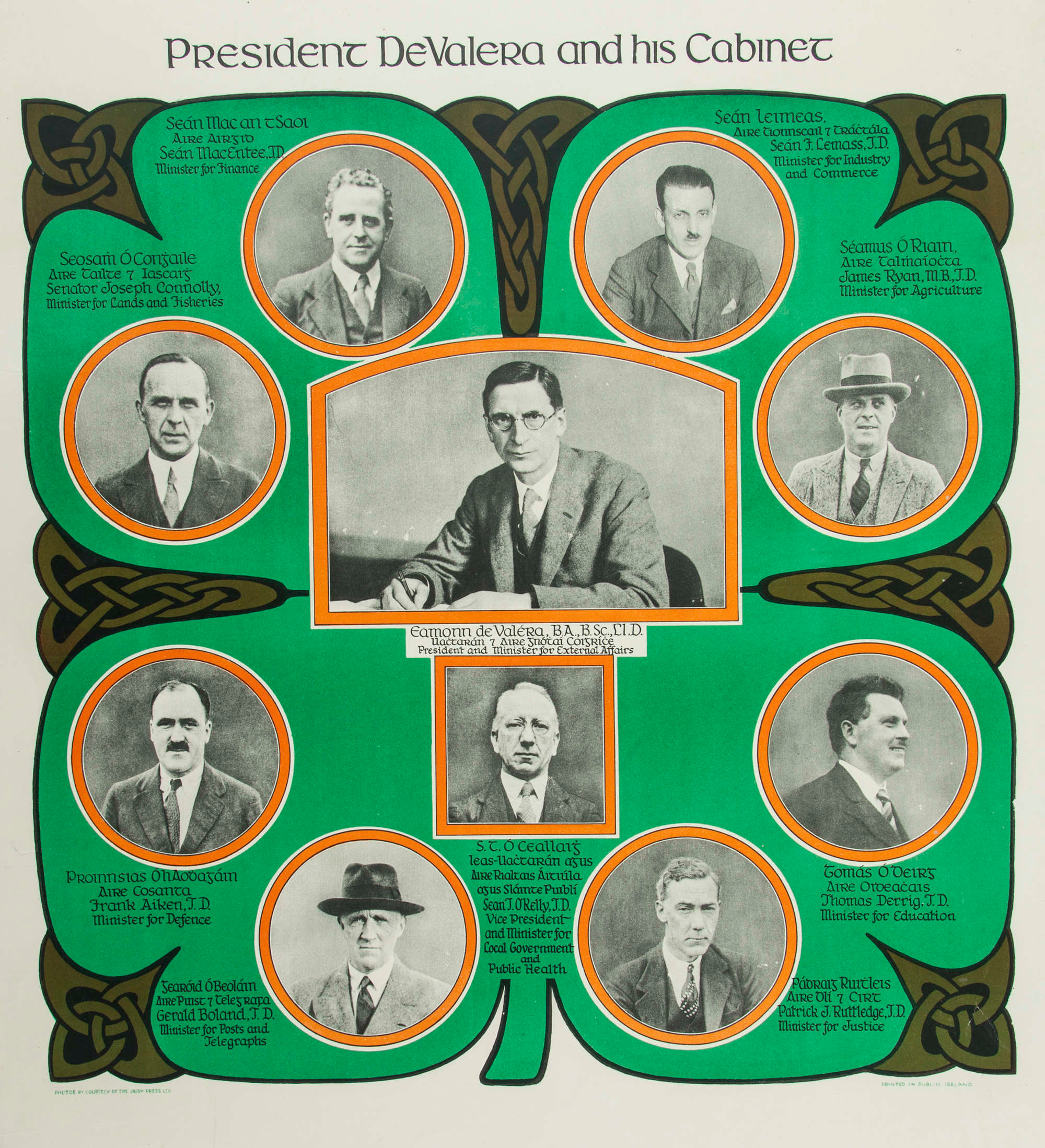
De Valera's cabinet in 1933

Office	Name	Term
President of the Executive Council	Éamon de Valera	1933–1937
Minister for External Affairs	Éamon de Valera	1933–1937
Vice-President of the Executive Council	Seán T. O'Kelly	1933–1937
Minister for Local Government and Public Health	Seán T. O'Kelly	1933–1937
Minister for Justice	P. J. Ruttledge	1933–1937
Minister for Industry and Commerce	Seán Lemass	1933–1937
Minister for Finance	Seán MacEntee	1933–1937
Minister for Agriculture	James Ryan	1933–1937
Minister for Defence	Frank Aiken	1933–1937
Minister for Education	Thomas Derrig	1933–1937
Minister for Lands and Fisheries	Joseph Connolly	1933–1936
Minister for Posts and Telegraphs	Gerald Boland	1933–1936
=== Changes 3 June 1936 === Reassignment of department on abolition of Seanad Éireann.
Office	Name	Term
Minister for Lands and Fisheries	Frank Aiken	1936
=== Changes 11 November 1936 === Appointment of Ministers.
Office	Name	Term
Minister for Lands and Fisheries	Gerald Boland	1936–1937
Minister for Posts and Telegraphs	Oscar Traynor	1936–1937

== Attorney General ==
Conor Maguire SC was appointed by the Governor-General as Attorney General on the nomination of the Executive Council.

== Parliamentary secretaries ==
On 8 February, the Executive Council appointed Parliamentary secretaries on the nomination of the President.

Name	Office	Term
Patrick Little	Government Chief Whip	1933–1937
Patrick Little	Parliamentary secretary to the Minister for External Affairs	1933–1937
Hugo Flinn	Parliamentary secretary to the Minister for Finance	1933–1937
Conn Ward	Parliamentary secretary to the Minister for Local Government and Public Health	1933–1937
Seán O'Grady	Parliamentary secretary to the Minister for Lands and Fisheries	1933–1937
=== Changes 3 June 1936 === On the assignment of a second department to Aiken.
Name	Office	Term
Oscar Traynor	Parliamentary secretary to the Minister for Defence	Jun.–Nov. 1936
=== Changes 11 November 1936 === On the appointment of Oscar Traynor to the Executive Council.
Name	Office	Term
Seán O'Grady	Parliamentary secretary to the Minister for Defence	1936–1937

== Amendments to the Constitution of the Irish Free State ==
The following amendments to the Constitution of the Irish Free State were proposed by the Executive Council and passed by the Oireachtas.

- Constitution (Removal of Oath) Act 1933 (3 May 1933): Abolished the Oath of Allegiance and removed requirements that the constitution and laws of the Free State be compatible with the Anglo-Irish Treaty. This involved repealing Section 2 of the Constitution of the Irish Free State (Saorstát Éireann) Act 1922, as well as altering provisions of the constitution.
- Amendment No. 20 (2 November 1933): Removed the Governor General's role in recommending appropriations of money to the Dáil on the advice of the Executive Council. This function was transferred directly to the Executive Council. In practice this change was merely symbolic.
- Amendment No. 21 (2 November 1933): Removed provisions granting the Governor General the right to veto bills or reserve them "for the King's pleasure" by referring them to London.
- Amendment No. 22 (16 November 1933): Abolished the right of appeal to the Privy Council.
- Amendment No. 26 (5 April 1935): Made a technical change to Article 3, which dealt with citizenship.
- Amendment No. 23 (24 April 1936): Abolished the two university constituencies in the Dáil.
- Amendment No. 24 (29 May 1936): Abolished Seanad Éireann.
- Amendment No. 27 (11 December 1936): Abolished the office of Governor General and removed all reference to the King from the constitution. The functions of the Governor General were transferred to various other branches of government.

== Role of the Monarch ==
As well as the constitutional changes above affecting the status of the British monarch, after the abdication of Edward VIII on 11 December 1936, the Executive Council proposed and passed the Executive Authority (External Relations) Act 1936 which reduced the role of the King to external functions only. It was followed the following year by the Executive Powers (Consequential Provisions) Act 1937, which completed the process of removing the position of Governor-General from Irish law.

== Proposal of the Constitution of Ireland ==
The Executive Council proposed a new Constitution of Ireland which passed final stages in the Dáil on 14 June 1937. In a plebiscite held on 1 July 1937, the same date as a general election, the Constitution was approved with the support of 56.5% of votes cast. It came into force on 29 December 1937.
