= Government of the 5th Dáil =

Governments of the Irish Free State June to October 1927

3rd executive council of the Irish Free State
- Executive Council of the Irish Free State
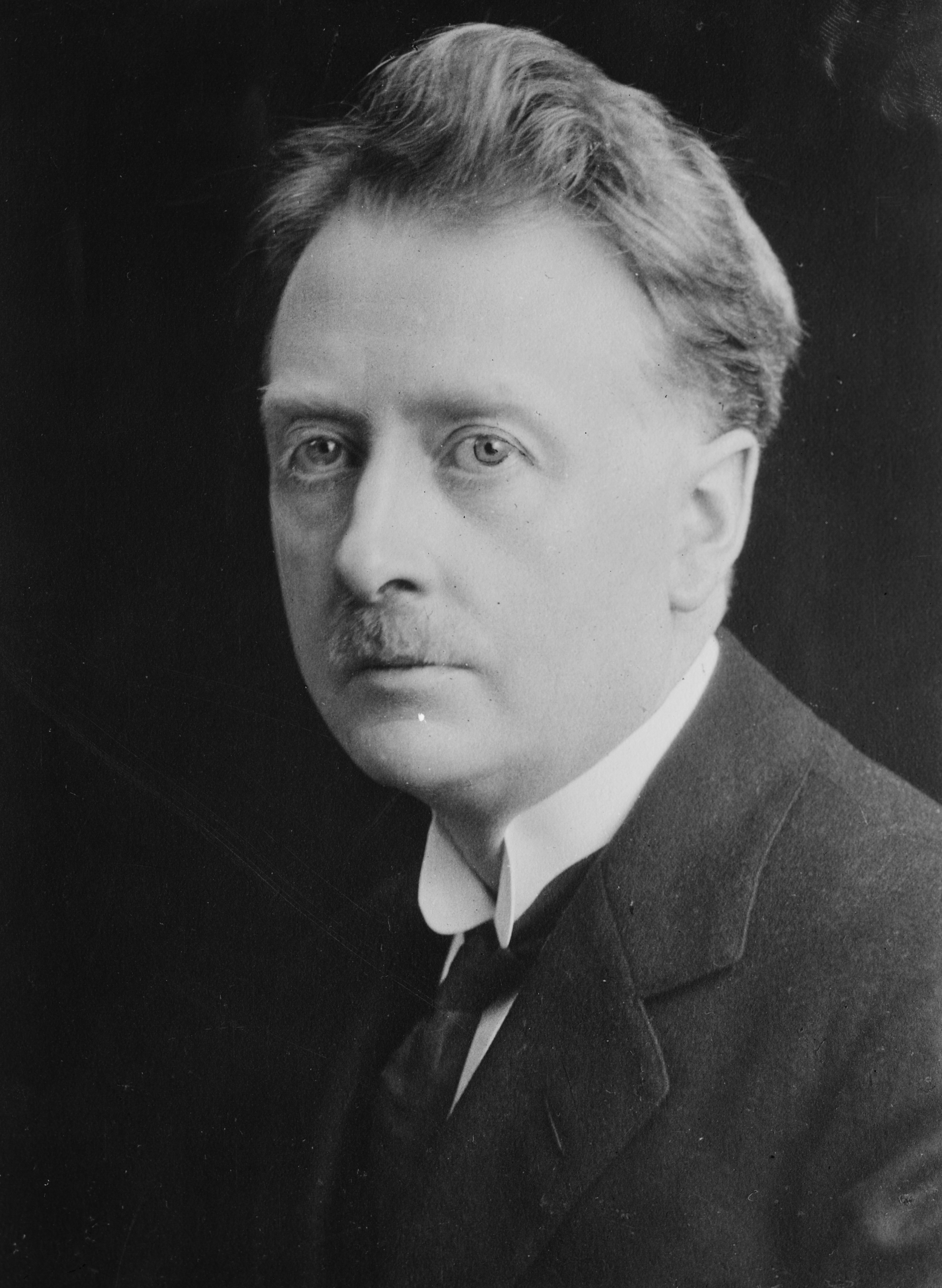
- Date formed: 23 June 1927
- Date dissolved: 11 October 1927

People and organisations
- King: George V
- Governor-General: Tim Healy
- President of the Executive Council: W. T. Cosgrave
- Vice-President of the Executive Council: Kevin O'Higgins (Jun.–Jul. 1927); Ernest Blythe (Jul.–Oct. 1927)
- Total no. of members: 10
- Member party: Cumann na nGaedheal
- Status in legislature: Minority government
- Opposition parties: Labour Party; Fianna Fáil
- Opposition leaders: Thomas Johnson (Jun.–Aug. 1927) (Lab); Éamon de Valera (Aug.–Oct. 1927) (FF)

History
- Election: June 1927 general election
- Legislature terms: 5th Dáil; 1st Seanad (1925–1928)
- Predecessor: 2nd executive council
- Successor: 4th executive council

The 3rd executive council of the Irish Free State (23 June 1927 – 11 October 1927) was formed after the June 1927 general election to the 5th Dáil held on 9 June 1927. It was led by W. T. Cosgrave, leader of Cumann na nGaedheal, as President of the Executive Council, who had led the government since August 1922. It lasted 110 days.

== Nomination of President of the Executive Council ==
The 5th Dáil first met on 23 June 1927. In the debate on the nomination of the President of the Executive Council, Cumann na nGaedheal leader and outgoing President W. T. Cosgrave was proposed, and this resolution was carried with 68 votes in favour and 22 against. Cosgrave was then appointed as President of the Executive Council by Governor-General Tim Healy.

23 June 1927; Nomination of W. T. Cosgrave (CnaG) as President of the Executive Council; Motion proposed by James Murphy and seconded by Peadar Doyle; Absolute majority: 77/153
Vote	Parties	Votes
Yes	Cumann na nGaedheal (44), Farmers' Party (11), Independents (13)	68 / 153
No	Labour Party (22)	22 / 153
Absent or Not voting	National League (8), Cumann na nGaedheal (2), Independents (1), Ceann Comhairle (1)	12 / 153
Abstentionist	Fianna Fáil (44), Sinn Féin (5), Independent (2)	51 / 153

== Members of the Executive Council ==
The members of the Executive Council were nominated by the president and approved by the Dáil by a vote of 66 to 31. They were then appointed by the Governor General.

Office	Name
President of the Executive Council	W. T. Cosgrave
Vice-President of the Executive Council	Kevin O'Higgins
Minister for External Affairs	Kevin O'Higgins
Minister for Justice	Kevin O'Higgins
Minister for Finance	Ernest Blythe
Minister for Defence	Desmond FitzGerald
Minister for Industry and Commerce	Patrick McGilligan
Minister for Education	John M. O'Sullivan
Minister for Agriculture and Lands	Patrick Hogan
Minister for Fisheries	Fionán Lynch
Minister for Local Government and Public Health	Richard Mulcahy
Minister for Posts and Telegraphs	J. J. Walsh
=== Changes 14 July 1927 === Following the assassination of Kevin O'Higgins.
Office	Name
Vice-President of the Executive Council	Ernest Blythe
Minister for External Affairs	W. T. Cosgrave (acting)
Minister for Justice	W. T. Cosgrave (acting)

== Parliamentary secretaries ==
The Executive Council appointed Parliamentary secretaries on the nomination of the President. The first three were appointed on 24 June 1927.

Name	Office
Eamonn Duggan	Government Chief Whip
Eamonn Duggan	Parliamentary secretary to the Minister for Defence
Séamus Burke	Parliamentary secretary to the Minister for Finance
Martin Roddy	Parliamentary secretary to the Minister for Fisheries
=== Appointment 18 August 1927 ===
Name	Office
James FitzGerald-Kenney	Parliamentary secretary to the Minister for Justice

== Actions of the government ==
After the assassination of Kevin O'Higgins on 10 July 1927, the Executive Council proposed the Electoral (Amendment) (No. 2) Bill. This legislation provided for the disqualification for five years of any member of the Oireachtas who did not take the Oath of Allegiance prescribed in Article 17 of the Constitution of the Irish Free State. After this legislation had passed both houses, the TDs elected for Fianna Fáil led by Éamon de Valera took the oath and entered the Dáil for the first time since the 1922 general election.

== Confidence in the government ==
On 16 August, Labour Party leader Thomas Johnson proposed a motion of no confidence in the Executive Council, which was defeated.

16 August 1927; Motion of no confidence in the Executive Council; Motion proposed by Thomas Johnson (Lab) and seconded by Hugh Colohan (Lab); Absolute majority: 77/153
Vote	Parties	Votes
Yes	Fianna Fáil (43), Labour Party (21), National League (6), Independent (1)	71 / 153
No	Cumann na nGaedheal (45), Farmers' Party (11), Independents (15)	71 / 153
Absent	Labour Party (1), National League (1)	2 / 153
Vacant	2	2 / 153
Abstentionist	Sinn Féin (5), Independent (1)	6 / 153
Ceann Comhairle Michael Hayes exercised his casting vote against the motion.

== Dissolution ==
On 24 August, Cumann na nGaedheal won two by-elections, and sought to capitalise on this success by calling a new general election seeking an increased mandated. The president sought a dissolution of the Dáil and a new election was held in September 1927.
