= Constitution (Amendment No. 4) Act 1927 =

The Constitution (Amendment No. 4) Act 1927 (act no. 5 of 1927, previously bill no. 36 of 1926) was an Act of the Oireachtas of the Irish Free State amending the Constitution of the Irish Free State which had been adopted in 1922.

It amended Article 28 of the Constitution to increase the period of Dáil Éireann from "four years" to "six years or such shorter period as may be fixed by legislation". The Electoral (Amendment) Act 1927 set a maximum term of five years from the date of the first sitting of the Dáil.

The Act became obsolete on the repeal of the 1922 Constitution in 1937, and was repealed by the Statute Law Revision Act 2016.

Article 16.5 of the Constitution of Ireland adopted in 1937 provide a maximum term of seven years for the duration of the Dáil Éireann, and that a shorter period may be fixed by law. The term in law of five years in the 1927 Act continued in force. The Act was repealed by the Electoral Act 1963, which was itself repealed in part by the Electoral Act 1992, both of which also specify a term of five years for Dáil Éireann.
