= Constitution (Amendment No. 11) Act 1929 =

The Constitution (Amendment No. 11) Act 1929 (previously bill no. 24 of 1928) was an Act amending the Constitution of the Irish Free State. It amended Article 34 of the constitution regarding the filling of casual vacancies in Seanad Éireann.

Article 34 as enacted had provided that vacancies would be filled by a vote of the Seanad. Under Amendment No. 11, the provision was changed to provide that the vote would be by members of Dáil Éireann and Seanad Éireann voting together. This is the electorate used for casual vacancies to the vocational panels in Seanad Éireann established by the Constitution of Ireland.

The Act became obsolete on the repeal of the 1922 Constitution by the Constitution of Ireland in 1937, and was formally repealed by the Statute Law Revision Act 2016.
