= Constitution (Removal of Oath) Act 1933 =

The Constitution (Removal of Oath) Act 1933 (act no. 6 of 1933, previously bill no. 2 of 1932) was an Act of the Oireachtas of the Irish Free State amending the Constitution of the Irish Free State and the Constitution of the Irish Free State (Saorstát Eireann) Act 1922. It removed the Oath of Allegiance required of members of the Oireachtas (legislature) and of non-Oireachtas extern ministers.

The oath, pledging allegiance to the Constitution and fidelity to George V as King of Ireland, was required by the Anglo-Irish Treaty signed in 1921, and had been the symbolic focus of Irish republican opposition to the Treaty in the 1922–23 Irish Civil War. When Fianna Fáil was founded in 1926 by veterans of the losing anti-Treaty side in the Civil War, abolishing the oath was a core aim. It was a main item in the manifesto for its successful 1932 general election campaign, after which it formed a minority government whose first action was to introduce the Constitution (Removal of Oath) Bill 1932. Seanad Éireann had more ex-unionists and others conciliatory towards the United Kingdom, and voted to reject the bill unless the Treaty could be amended by agreement. After the 1933 general election, the Fianna Fáil majority government was able to override the Seanad and enact the law.

As well as amending the Constitution, the 1933 act also amended the Constitution of the Irish Free State (Saorstát Eireann) Act 1922, which had both created the Constitution in Irish law and also prohibited any Constitutional amendment incompatible with the Treaty. Since the Free State could not unilaterally amend the Treaty, Fianna Fáil amended the 1922 act to remove the Treaty's precedence over the Constitution. Later constitutional amendments were also incompatible with the terms of the Treaty, in particular by weakening and ultimately abolishing the office of Governor-General. There was legal controversy over whether the Oireachtas had the power to amend the 1922 act, because it had been passed by the 3rd Dáil sitting as a constituent assembly before the Oireachtas had come into being. In 1935 the Judicial Committee of the Privy Council in London ruled that, in British law, the Oireachtas did have the power, under the Statute of Westminster 1931. Irish jurisprudence took issue with many of the assumptions underlying the 1935 decision.

The question was rendered moot with the adoption of a new constitution in 1937 which repealed the Free State Constitution. The 1933 act was itself repealed as spent by the Statute Law Revision Act 2016.
