= Constitution (Amendment No. 10) Act 1928 =

The Constitution (Amendment No. 10) Act 1928 (act no. 8 of 1928, previously bill no. 23 of 1926) was an Act of the Oireachtas of the Irish Free State amending the Constitution of the Irish Free State which had been adopted in 1922. It removed the provisions for direct democracy in the constitution.

Article 47 of the Constitution had provided for reference of Bills to referendum following a petition of one-twentieth of the electorate. Article 48 allowed the Oireachtas to provide for proposals for legislation or constitutional amendment to be commenced by petition. Both these articles were repealed, and references to these procedures in articles 14 and 50 were deleted.

The Act was a response to attempts by the Fianna Fáil opposition to use the direct democracy provisions to amend or repeal measures put in place under the terms of the Anglo-Irish Treaty.

The Amendment did not affect the reference of amendments of the Constitution to referendum. However, the extension of the period for which the Oireachtas could amend the Constitution by ordinary legislation in Constitution (Amendment No. 16) Act 1929 from eight to sixteen years meant that no referendums were held under the terms of the Constitution of the Irish Free State. The only referendum held was in the Irish Free State the plebiscite approving the adoption of the Constitution of Ireland on 1 July 1937.

The Act became obsolete on the repeal of the 1922 Constitution in 1937, and was repealed by the Statute Law Revision Act 2016.
