= Constitution (Amendment No. 12) Act 1930 =

The Constitution (Amendment No. 12) Act 1930 (previously bill no. 25 of 1928) was an Act of the Oireachtas of the Irish Free State amending the Constitution of the Irish Free State. It amended Article 35 of the constitution.

As enacted, Article 35 had provided that a question as to whether a Bill was a money bill could be referred, at the request of 2/5ths of either house, within three days of the Bill being passed by Dáil Éireann, to a Committee of Privileges comprising three members from each House and chaired by a judge of the Supreme Court of Ireland.

Under Amendment No. 12, the provision was changed to make such a referral easier. The time for reference was extended to 7 days (or the return of the Bill by Seanad Éireann if earlier), and the threshold reduced to 2/5ths or a simple majority vote of the Seanad at which at least 30 members attended. Failure of the committee to report within 21 days rendered the decision of the Chairman of Dáil Eireann final.

The Act became obsolete on the repeal of the 1922 Constitution by the Constitution of Ireland in 1937, and was formally repealed by the Statute Law Revision Act 2016.
