= Constitution (Amendment No. 23) Act 1936 =

The Constitution (Amendment No. 23) Act 1936 (act no. 17 of 1936, previously bill no. 12 of 1934) was an Act of the Oireachtas of the Irish Free State amending the Constitution of the Irish Free State which had been adopted in 1922. It abolished the two university constituencies in Dáil Éireann.

== Background ==
The Dublin University (Trinity College Dublin) had been a constituency in the Irish House of Commons from 1613 to 1800 and in the United Kingdom House of Commons from 1801 to 1922. The National University was a constituency in the UK House of Commons from 1918 to 1922. The Government of Ireland Act 1920 gave both universities four seats each in the Southern Ireland House of Commons.

Article 27 of the Constitution of the Irish Free State provided:

Each University in the Irish Free State (Saorstát Eireann), which was in existence at the date of the coming into operation of this Constitution, shall be entitled to elect three representatives to Dáil Eireann upon a franchise and in a manner to be prescribed by law.

The Electoral Act 1923 required voters eligible to vote in university constituencies to choose to register in that constituency or in a geographical constituency.

== Change to the text ==
The Amendment deleted Article 27 in its entirety and deleted references to university constituencies in Articles 26 and 28. It came into effect on the dissolution of the Oireachtas next following the Act, which occurred on 14 June 1937. The change to the electoral law was made by the Electoral (University Constituencies) Act 1936, transferring all those on the register for university constituencies to the register for geographical constituencies.

== Oireachtas debate ==
The Constitution (Amendment No. 23) Bill 1934 passed Second Stage in the Dáil on 8 May 1934 by 58 to 34, and passed Final Stage on 5 July 1934 by 51 to 29. On 18 July 1934, it was defeated at Second Stage in Seanad Éireann by a vote of 15 to 30.

On 6 February 1936, the Dáil passed a motion under Article 38A of the Constitution by a vote of 66 to 38 that the bill be sent again to the Seanad. On 26 February 1936, the Seanad passed an amendment to the bill, which would have delayed its effect until six months after the dissolution of the Oireachtas. On 23 April 1936, the Dáil passed a motion of enactment by 58 to 40 resolving that the bill be deemed to have passed both Houses. It was signed by the Governor-General the following day.

== Expiry ==
The Amendment became obsolete on the repeal of the 1922 Constitution on the adoption of the Constitution of Ireland in 1937, and was repealed by the Statute Law Revision Act 2016.

Both Dublin University and the National University were given three seats in new constituencies in Seanad Éireann established under the Constitution of Ireland adopted on 29 December 1937, with the first elections in 1938.
