= Constitution of 1925 =

Constitution of 1925 may refer to one of the following:

- Chilean Constitution of 1925
- Greek Constitution of 1925 (see Constitutional history of Greece#The Second Hellenic Republic and the Restoration (1925–1941))
- Constitution of Iraq, which first came into force in 1925
- 1925 Constitution of the Russian SFSR

== See also ==
- Constitution (Amendment No. 1) Act 1925, an Act amending the Constitution of the Irish Free State
