= Constitution (Amendment No. 2) Act 1927 =

Act of Irish legislation

The Constitution (Amendment No. 2) Act 1927 (previously bill no. 34 of 1926) was an Act amending the Constitution of the Irish Free State which had been adopted in 1922. It amended Article 21 of the constitution to provide for the automatic re-election of the Ceann Comhairle of Dáil Éireann.

This provision was replicated in Article 16.6 of the Constitution of Ireland adopted in 1937.

The Act became obsolete on the repeal of the 1922 Constitution in 1937, and was repealed by the Statute Law Revision Act 2016.
