= Abolition of the Seanad =

Abolition of the Seanad may refer to:

- Abolition of the Seanad of the Irish Free State, a historical event effected by the Constitution (Amendment No. 24) Act 1936
- Abolition of the extant Seanad, constituted in 1938:
  - Thirty-second Amendment of the Constitution Bill 2013, defeated at a referendum
  - Seanad Éireann § Calls for reform, some favouring abolition
