= Constitution (Amendment No. 17) Act 1931 =

Irish constitutional amendment of 1931

The Constitution (Amendment No. 17) Act 1931 (Act no. 37 of 1931, previously bill no. 40 of 1931), popularly called the Public Safety Act 1931, was an Act of the Oireachtas of the Irish Free State amending the Constitution of the Irish Free State. It inserted Article 2A which empowered the Executive Council to declare a state of emergency during which most provisions of the constitution could be suspended and extra security measures taken. These measures included the uses of the Constitution (Special Powers) Tribunal, a military tribunal, to try civilians for political offences, granting extra powers of search and arrest to the Garda Síochána (police), and the prohibition of organisations deemed a threat to the state's security.

The act was rushed through in October by the then government of Cumann na nGaedheal under W. T. Cosgrave, during a period of increased activity by physical force Irish republicans. Cosgrave declared an emergency as soon as the act was passed and prohibited republican organisations, including the Irish Republican Army, Fianna Éireann, Cumann na mBan and Saor Éire, as well as communist revolutionary groups.

The military tribunal was motivated in part by jury intimidation in trials of republican activists.

The opposition Fianna Fáil party condemned the act and ended the emergency when it took office after the 1932 election. However, in 1933 it reinstated the emergency and banned the Blueshirts, and in 1936 the IRA was banned again. In the landmark 1934 case State (Ryan) v. Lennon, the Supreme Court of Ireland held that the Oireachtas had not acted ultra vires in passing the 1931 act.

The Act became obsolete on the repeal of the 1922 Constitution by the Constitution of Ireland in 1937, and was formally repealed by the Statute Law Revision Act 2016.

Article 28.3.3° of the Constitution of Ireland allows the Oireachtas to declare a state of emergency during a period of war or armed rebellion. Experience of the 1931 act informed the provisions of the Emergency Powers Act 1939, in force during the Emergency of World War II, and those of the Offences against the State Act 1939, which remains in force with amendments.
