= Dáil Éireann (disambiguation) =

Dáil Éireann, or the Dáil, may refer to:

- Dáil Éireann (Irish Republic) (1919–22)
- Dáil Éireann (Irish Free State) (1922–37)
- Dáil Éireann (current)
