= Constitution (Amendment No. 24) Act 1936 =

Amendment abolishing the Irish Free State Seanad

The Constitution (Amendment No. 24) Act, 1936 (Act no. 18 of 1936; previously Bill no. 20 of 1934) was an act of the Oireachtas (parliament) of the Irish Free State which abolished Seanad Éireann, the upper house of the Oireachtas, which thenceforth was unicameral, with Dáil Éireann as the sole house. The bill was introduced in 1934 by the Fianna Fáil government of Éamon de Valera, which was frustrated by the Seanad's repeated use of its power to delay (though not veto) legislation. In particular, Fianna Fáil favoured eliminating symbols of monarchy from the Free State, which the Seanad, with more Southern Unionist members, feared would antagonise the United Kingdom.

The Seanad opposed the bill, declining in June 1934 to give it a second reading. The Dáil resubmitted the bill in December 1935 and the Seanad passed a motion declining to pass it unless a replacement second chamber was created. In May 1936, the Dáil overrode the Seanad's refusal.

The act deleted 16 articles of the 1922 Constitution and made consequential amendments to numerous others. It also increased the threshold for passing a resolution of impeachment (of judges or the Comptroller and Auditor General) from a simple majority to a four-sevenths supermajority, since only one house, rather than two, would thenceforth be voting on such a resolution.

When a new Seanad was created by the 1937 Constitution it was in a weakened form. Eleven senators of the sixty were to be nominated by the Taoiseach, assisting the likelihood of a government majority.

== Expiry ==
The Amendment became obsolete on the repeal of the 1922 Constitution on the adoption of the Constitution of Ireland in 1937, and was repealed as spent law by the Statute Law Revision Act 2016.
