= Constitution (Amendment No. 26) Act 1935 =

The Constitution (Amendment No. 26) Act 1935 (act no. 12 of 1935, previously bill no. 52 of 1934) was an Act of the Oireachtas of the Irish Free State amending the Constitution of the Irish Free State which had been adopted in 1922. It removed the restriction on the jurisdiction on citizenship law to the effect that citizenship rights only applied within the jurisdiction of the Free State.

It amended Article 3 by the deletion of the words struck out below and insertion of the words emphasised in bold:

Every person, without distinction of sex, domiciled in the area of the jurisdiction of the Irish Free State (Saorstát Eireann) at the time of the coming into operation of this Constitution, who was born in Ireland or either of whose parents was born in Ireland or who has been ordinarily resident in the area of the jurisdiction of the Irish Free State (Saorstát Eireann) for not less than seven years, is a citizen of the Irish Free State (Saorstát Eireann) and shall ~~within the limits of the jurisdiction of the Irish Free State (Saorstát Eireann)~~ enjoy the privileges and be subject to the obligations of such citizenship: Provided that any such person being a citizen of another State may elect not to accept the citizenship hereby conferred; and the conditions governing the future acquisition and termination of citizenship ~~in~~ of the Irish Free State (Saorstát Eireann) shall be determined by law.

Section 34 of the Irish Nationality and Citizenship Act 1935, enacted shortly after this amendment, provided,

Every person who is a citizen of Saorstát Eireann by virtue of Article 3 of the Constitution and every person who is or becomes a citizen of Saorstát Eireann by or under this Act shall be such citizen for all purposes, municipal and international.

The Amendment became obsolete on the repeal of the 1922 Constitution on the adoption of the Constitution of Ireland in 1937, and was repealed by the Statute Law Revision Act 2016.
