= Second Amendment of the Constitution of Ireland =

Amendment to the Irish constitution

The Second Amendment of the Constitution Act 1941 (previously bill no. 40 of 1941) is an amendment of the Constitution of Ireland that was in the form of omnibus legislation affecting a variety of articles on a range of subject matters. It was signed into law on 30 May 1941.

== Background ==
The constitution came into force on 29 December 1937, and Douglas Hyde, the first president, took office on 25 June 1938. While the constitution mandated that amendments to it would usually require a referendum, its transitory provisions provided that for the first three years after the first president took office, amendment would be by ordinary act of the Oireachtas (parliament). (Note: This transitional provision was itself immune from such a non-referendum amendment; this contrasted with the corresponding provision of the 1922 Constitution of the Irish Free State, where the initial 8-year transition period was extended in 1929 for a further 8 years.) The intention was that teething troubles and inconveniences which early experience of the new constitution might uncover could be fixed conveniently without the expense of a referendum. (Note: The President had discretionary power to call a referendum if a large minority of Oireachtas members petitioned for one, but the First and Second Amendment changes were uncontentious and no such petition was mooted.) In January 1938, the Department of the Taoiseach established a file for proposed amendments, with a view to enacting a single omnibus bill prior to the expiry of the three-year transition period on 25 June 1941. The First Amendment was prepared separately after the Munich Crisis and rushed through the Oireachtas at the outbreak of the Second World War, to allow the Emergency Powers Act 1939 to operate for the duration of "The Emergency".

Amendments suggested by various Departments of state were added to the Department of the Taoiseach's omnibus file. In April 1940, Éamon de Valera, the Taoiseach, established a committee to review the file and make suggestions, chaired by Maurice Moynihan with members from the Attorney General's office, the Department of External Affairs and the parliamentary draftsman's office. The committee met in May and June and in September delivered its report, which was circulated to departments for comment. An initial draft of the amendment bill was made in November 1940, and given a first reading in the Dáil (lower house) 27 November 1940. It was debated and amended by the Dáil and Seanad (upper house) in April and May 1941, and signed into law by President Hyde on 30 May 1941.

The most important changes introduced by the amendment included restrictions on the right to habeas corpus, an extension of the right of the government to declare a state of emergency, changes to provisions on the reference of bills to the Supreme Court by the President, and various changes that were needed to bring the official Irish text of the constitution into line with the English text. An unusual aspect of the Second Amendment was that it introduced a change to Article 56 of the transitory provisions even though that article was no longer a part of the official published text of the constitution.

== Overview of changes ==
The Second Amendment made the following alterations to the constitution:

=== Reference of bills to the Supreme Court ===
Altered Article 26, which deals with the referral by the president of a bill to the Supreme Court to test its constitutionality. Most importantly, the amendment introduced a requirement that when ruling on a bill referred to it by the president under his reserve powers, the Supreme Court can issue only one opinion, and no dissenting opinions are permitted. That was in keeping with the practice in many civil law supreme courts and was intended to promote legal certainty. However, the provision that was added by Article 26 applies only for presidential references of bills, and the Supreme Court may still issue dissenting opinions in all other circumstances. A further alteration to Article 34 provided that a law that has survived a reference to the Supreme Court can never again have its constitutionality challenged.

=== Habeas corpus ===
Altered Article 40, dealing with habeas corpus. Before the Second Amendment, detained individuals had the constitutional right to apply to any High Court judge for a writ of habeas corpus and to as many High Court judges as they wished. Since the Second Amendment, prisoners have a right to apply to only one judge, and once a writ had been issued, the President of the High Court has the authority to choose the judge or a panel of three judges to decide the case. The amendment also added that when the High Court believes someone's detention to be invalid because of the unconstitutionality of a law, it must refer the matter to the Supreme Court and may release the individual only on bail in the interim. Another new provision gave the High Court authority to defer a death sentence while it was considering a writ of habeas corpus. The provision became defunct with the 1990 abolition of Capital punishment in Ireland, and was removed by the Twenty-first Amendment in 2002.

=== National emergency ===
Altered Article 28 so that an officially-declared "time of war or armed rebellion" could be ended only by a resolution of both houses of the Oireachtas. The emergency declared at the outbreak of the Second World War was not declared to end until 1976, although the Emergency Powers Act 1939 lapsed in 1946.

=== Irish text ===
Made seven changes to the Irish text to align better with the (unchanged) English text. (Note: Two proposals to amend the English text to match the Irish text were considered in the draft stage but not proceeded with. Mícheál Ó Cearúil has pointed out many other potential divergences not considered in 1940–41, the best known being that the minimum age of office for Presidency is 35 in the Irish text but 34 in the English.) The Clerk of the Dáil, Department of Finance, and Gaeltacht Services section of the Department of Lands had supplied long lists of proposed changes to the Irish text, for clarity or to make the grammar, spelling, and technical vocabulary more consistent within the document and with earlier acts of the Free State Oireachtas. Maurice Moynihan and the Oireachtas translation section rejected almost all of these, adopting the conservative policy of making changes only where a clear inconsistency needed to be resolved. A few such were cases where the English text was amended during the 1937 Dáil debates and the Irish text had not been updated to match. Another was the First Amendment of the Constitution, rushed through at the start of the war, which had amended only the English text. The Second Amendment also added a provision that, in the event of inconsistency between the English and Irish texts, the Irish text would take precedence. (Note: The transitory provisions in 1937 already contained similar measures for the Constitution as originally adopted, but the Second Amendment copied these to the non-transitory part of the text, so they would apply to the Constitution as subsequently amended.)

=== Presidential vacancies ===
Altered Article 12.3.3°, which provides that in the event of the death, resignation or permanent incapacity of the president, a presidential election must occur within 60 days. The phrase "(whether occurring before or after he enters upon his office)" was added to clarify that the requirement would apply even if the president-elect had not yet assumed office. The Second Amendment also introduced to Article 14, which deals with the temporary exercise of the powers of the president by the Presidential Commission or the Council of State, a slight change to the wording to clarify that the organs may exercise not only the president's constitutional duties but also any additional duties that are conferred upon the president by law.

=== Seanad ===
Altered Article 18 to clarify that the Taoiseach who nominates senators after a Dáil general election must be nominated by the new Dáil and not an outgoing caretaker Taoiseach. An alteration was also made to the text of Article 24.2, which deals with the procedure if the time for the consideration of a bill in the Senate has been abridged.

=== Promulgation of laws ===
Introduced minor changes to Article 25, altering the precise procedure to be used in the signing, promulgation and enrolment of acts of the Oireachtas. It also added a new provision allowing the Taoiseach to enrol an updated version of the constitution with the registrar of the Supreme Court.

=== Reference of bills to the people ===
Introduced minor changes to the procedure for the reference of bills to the people under the reserve powers of the president. For example, it provided that the signatures on a petition to the president for a referendum must be verified in accordance to the law.

=== In camera court hearings ===
Altered Article 34 to provide that in "special and limited cases", a court may administer justice in camera.

=== Transitory provisions ===
Altered Article 56 to clarify the protections given to employees who had begun working for the government before the constitution was enacted. The change was unusual because by 1941, most of the transitory provisions, including Article 56, had been removed from all official published texts of the constitution. The provisions required their own omission on the grounds that they would no longer be relevant. However, most of the transitory provisions continued to have force of law and so could still be changed by a constitutional amendment.

== Sources ==
- Hogan, Gerard (2012). The Origins of the Irish Constitution: 1928–1941. Dublin: Royal Irish Academy. ISBN 9781904890751.
- Ó Cearúil, Micheál (2003). Bunreacht na hÉireann: divergences and inconsistencies?. An Aimsir Óg: Páipéar Ócáideach (in English and Irish). Vol. 2. Dublin: Coiscéim. ISSN 1649-3087. OCLC 854957460.
