= Minister for Defence (Ireland) =

Irish government cabinet minister

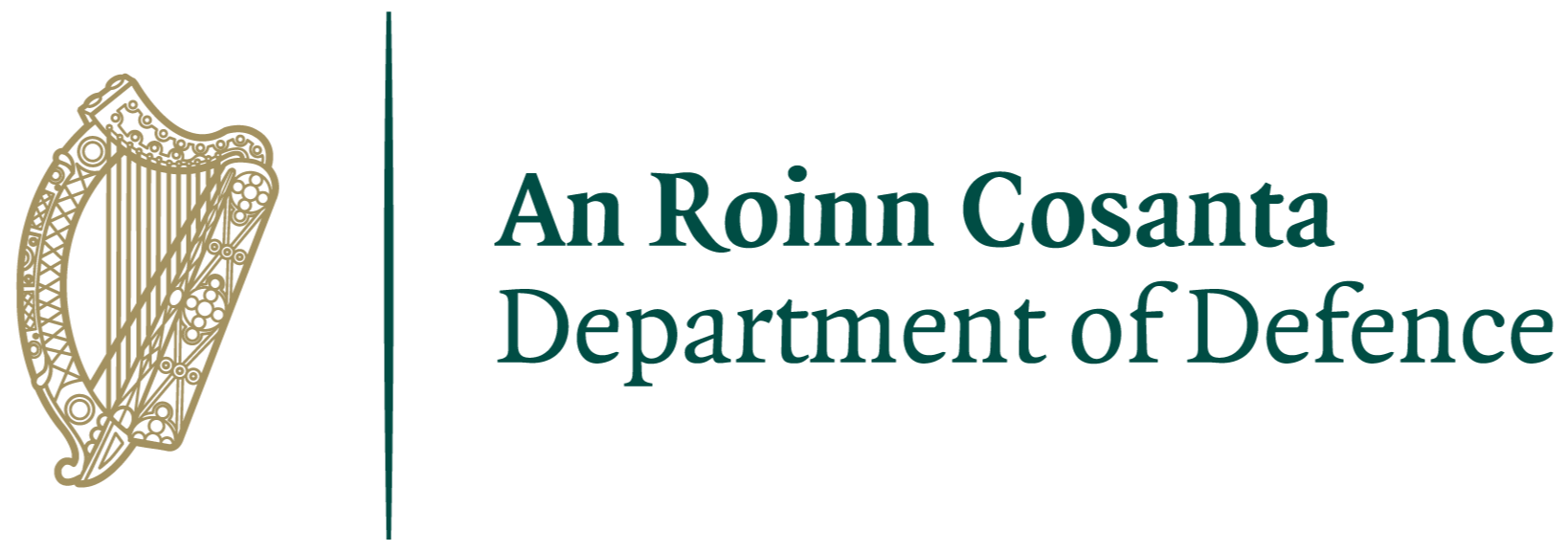

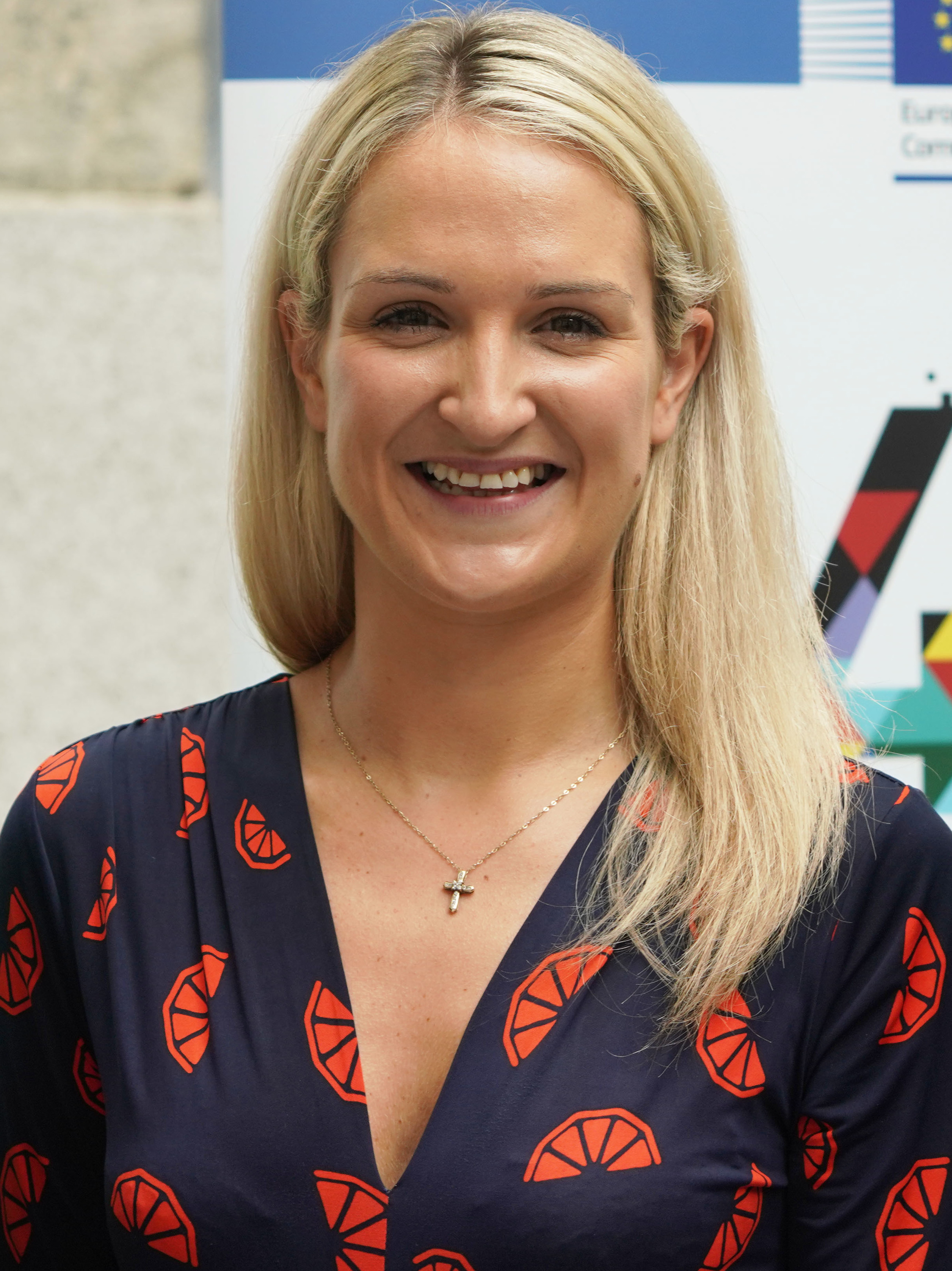
- Incumbent; Helen McEntee since 18 November 2025
- Department of Defence
- Type: Defence minister
- Status: Cabinet minister
- Member of: Government of Ireland; Council of the European Union; Dáil Éireann
- Reports to: Taoiseach
- Seat: Newbridge, Ireland
- Nominator: Taoiseach
- Appointer: President of Ireland (on the advice of the Taoiseach)
- Inaugural holder: Richard Mulcahy
- Formation: 22 January 1919
- Salary: €210,750 (2025) (including €115,953 TD salary)
- Website: Official website

The minister for defence (Irish: An tAire Cosanta) is a senior minister in the Government of Ireland and leads the Department of Defence. The current minister for defence is Helen McEntee, TD. She is also Minister for Foreign Affairs and Trade.

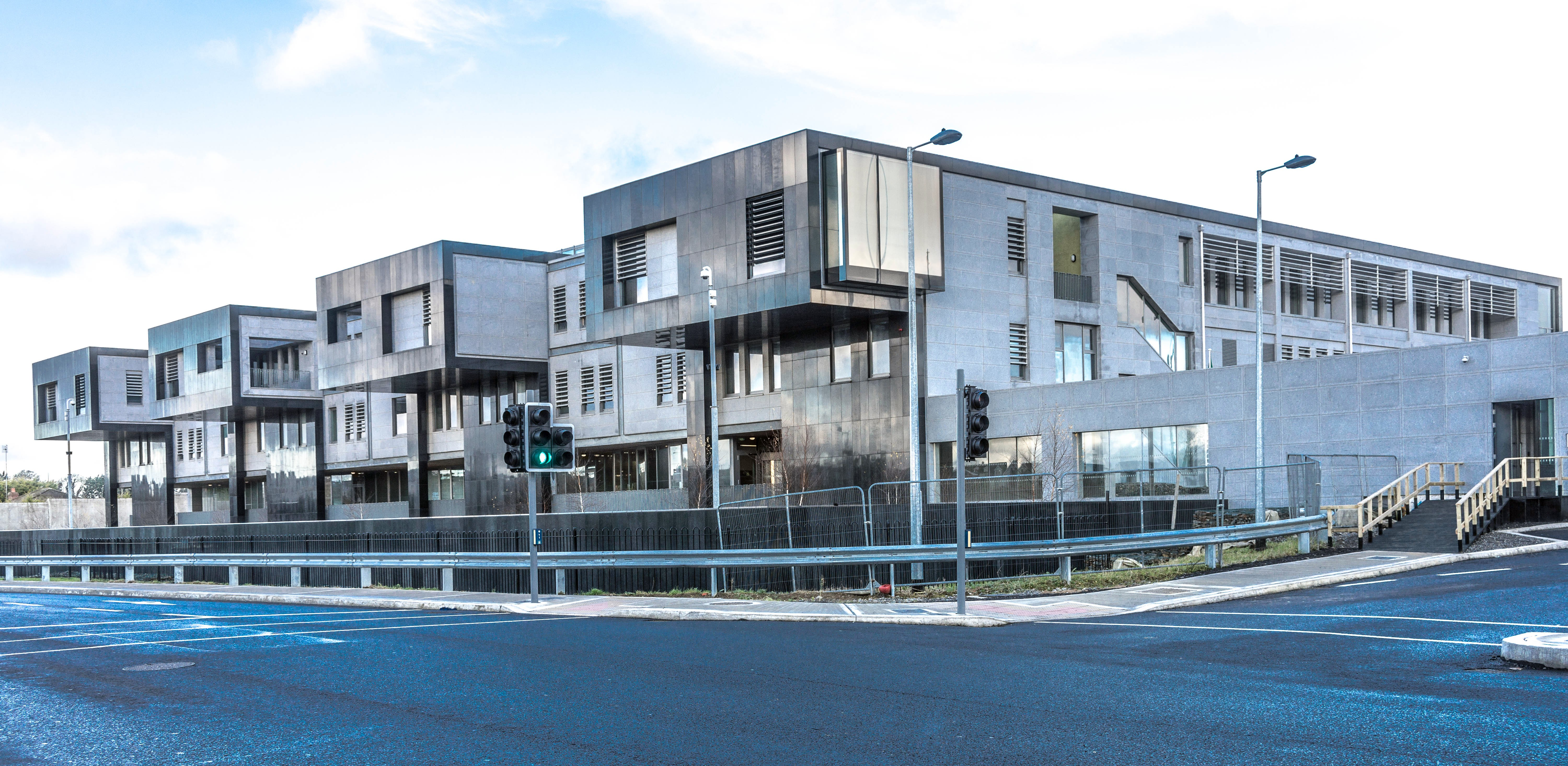
The Department of Defence headquarters are in Newbridge, County Kildare

The department is responsible for the Irish Defence Forces. The Ministers and Secretaries Acts 1924 assigned the minister the additional title of commander-in-chief as the chairman of the Council of Defence. The Defence Act 1954 removed this title, as a result of the reconstitution of the Council of Defence. The president of Ireland, a largely ceremonial role, is considered the Supreme Commander of the Defence Forces. In practice, the minister acts on the president's behalf and reports to the Irish Government. The minister for defence is advised by the Council of Defence on the business of the Department of Defence.

The minister is assisted by a minister of state at the Department of Defence, Thomas Byrne, TD.

== Ministers for defence since 1919 ==
Denotes acting Minister

Name	Term of office		Party	Government(s) (Note: Before 1937: DM – Dáil Ministry; PG – Provisional Government; EC – Executive Council.)
Richard Mulcahy (Note: On the first occasion he served as minister Mulcahy bore the title Minister for National Defence.) (1st time)	22 January 1919	1 April 1919	Sinn Féin	1st DM
Cathal Brugha (Note: Brugha bore the title Secretary of State for Defence.)	1 April 1919	9 January 1922	Sinn Féin	2nd DM • 3rd DM
Richard Mulcahy (2nd time)	10 January 1922	19 March 1924	Sinn Féin (Pro-Treaty)	4th DM • 1st PG • 2nd PG • 5th DM • 1st EC • 2nd EC
W. T. Cosgrave (acting) (Note: Also President of the Executive Council of the Irish Free State.)	20 March 1924	21 November 1924	Cumann na nGaedheal	2nd EC
Peter Hughes	21 November 1924	23 June 1927	Cumann na nGaedheal	2nd EC
Desmond FitzGerald	23 June 1927	9 March 1932	Cumann na nGaedheal	3rd EC • 4th EC • 5th EC
Frank Aiken	9 March 1932	8 September 1939	Fianna Fáil	6th EC • 7th EC • 8th EC • 1st • 2nd
Oscar Traynor (1st time)	8 September 1939	18 February 1948	Fianna Fáil	2nd • 3rd • 4th
Thomas F. O'Higgins	18 February 1948	7 March 1951	Fine Gael	5th
Seán Mac Eoin (1st time)	7 March 1951	13 June 1951	Fine Gael	5th
Oscar Traynor (2nd time)	13 June 1951	2 June 1954	Fianna Fáil	6th
Seán Mac Eoin (2nd time)	2 June 1954	20 March 1957	Fine Gael	7th
Kevin Boland	20 March 1957	11 October 1961	Fianna Fáil	8th • 9th
Gerald Bartley	11 October 1961	21 April 1965	Fianna Fáil	10th
Michael Hilliard	21 April 1965	2 July 1969	Fianna Fáil	11th • 12th
Jim Gibbons	2 July 1969	9 May 1970	Fianna Fáil	13th
Jerry Cronin	9 May 1970	14 March 1973	Fianna Fáil	13th
Paddy Donegan	14 March 1973	2 December 1976	Fine Gael	14th
Liam Cosgrave (acting) (Note: Also Taoiseach.)	2 December 1976	16 December 1976	Fine Gael	14th
Oliver J. Flanagan	16 December 1976	5 July 1977	Fine Gael	14th
Bobby Molloy	5 July 1977	11 December 1979	Fianna Fáil	15th
Pádraig Faulkner	12 December 1979	15 October 1980	Fianna Fáil	16th
Sylvester Barrett	15 October 1980	30 June 1981	Fianna Fáil	16th
James Tully	30 June 1981	9 March 1982	Labour	17th
Paddy Power	9 March 1982	14 December 1982	Fianna Fáil	18th
Patrick Cooney	14 December 1982	14 February 1986	Fine Gael	19th
Paddy O'Toole	14 February 1986	10 March 1987	Fine Gael	19th
Michael J. Noonan	10 March 1987	12 July 1989	Fianna Fáil	20th
Brian Lenihan	12 July 1989	31 October 1990	Fianna Fáil	21st
Charles Haughey (acting)	1 November 1990	5 February 1991	Fianna Fáil	21st
Brendan Daly	5 February 1991	14 November 1991	Fianna Fáil	21st
Vincent Brady	14 November 1991	11 February 1992	Fianna Fáil	21st
John Wilson	11 February 1992	12 January 1993	Fianna Fáil	22nd
David Andrews (Note: Also Minister for the Marine.) (1st time)	12 January 1993	15 December 1994	Fianna Fáil	23rd
Hugh Coveney	15 December 1994	23 May 1995	Fine Gael	24th
Seán Barrett	23 May 1995	26 June 1997	Fine Gael	24th
David Andrews (2nd time)	26 June 1997	8 October 1997	Fianna Fáil	25th
Michael Smith	8 October 1997	29 September 2004	Fianna Fáil	25th • 26th
Willie O'Dea	29 September 2004	18 February 2010	Fianna Fáil	26th • 27th • 28th
Brian Cowen (acting)	18 February 2010	23 March 2010	Fianna Fáil	28th
Tony Killeen	23 March 2010	19 January 2011	Fianna Fáil	28th
Éamon Ó Cuív (Note: Also Minister for Social Protection and (from 23 January) Minister for the Environment, Heritage and Local Government.)	20 January 2011	9 March 2011	Fianna Fáil	28th
Alan Shatter (Note: Also Minister for Justice and Equality.)	9 March 2011	7 May 2014	Fine Gael	29th
Enda Kenny (acting)	7 May 2014	11 July 2014	Fine Gael	29th
Simon Coveney (Note: Also Minister for Agriculture, Food and the Marine.) (1st time)	11 July 2014	6 May 2016	Fine Gael	29th
Enda Kenny	6 May 2016	14 June 2017	Fine Gael	30th
Leo Varadkar	14 June 2017	27 June 2020	Fine Gael	31st
Simon Coveney (Note: Also Minister for Foreign Affairs.) (2nd time)	27 June 2020	17 December 2022	Fine Gael	32nd
Micheál Martin	17 December 2022	23 January 2025	Fianna Fáil	33rd • 34th
Simon Harris (Note: Also Minister for Foreign Affairs and Trade.)	23 January 2025	18 November 2025	Fine Gael	35th
Helen McEntee	18 November 2025	Incumbent	Fine Gael	35th

== See also ==
- Chief of Staff of the Defence Forces (Ireland)
- Minister of State at the Department of Defence
- Director of Military Intelligence (Ireland)
