= Constitution (Amendment No. 1) Act 1925 =

The Constitution (Amendment No. 1) Act 1925 (previously bill no. 30 of 1925) was an Act of the Oireachtas of the Irish Free State amending the Constitution of the Irish Free State. It made technical amendments to the provisions regarding election of members of Seanad Éireann.

The Act added two new articles to the Constitution, Articles 31A and 32A. The new Article 31A provided that the term of office of the first Senators would run from 6 December 1922.

The Act became obsolete on the repeal of the 1922 Constitution by the Constitution of Ireland in 1937, and was formally repealed by the Statute Law Revision Act 2016.

The practice of numbering new constitutional articles by adding an "A" was also used for amendments to the Constitution of Ireland, such as Article 28A on Local Government added by the Twentieth Amendment in 1999 or Article 42A on Children added by the Thirty-first Amendment in 2015.
