= Oath of Allegiance (Ireland) =

1921 provision in the Anglo-Irish Treaty

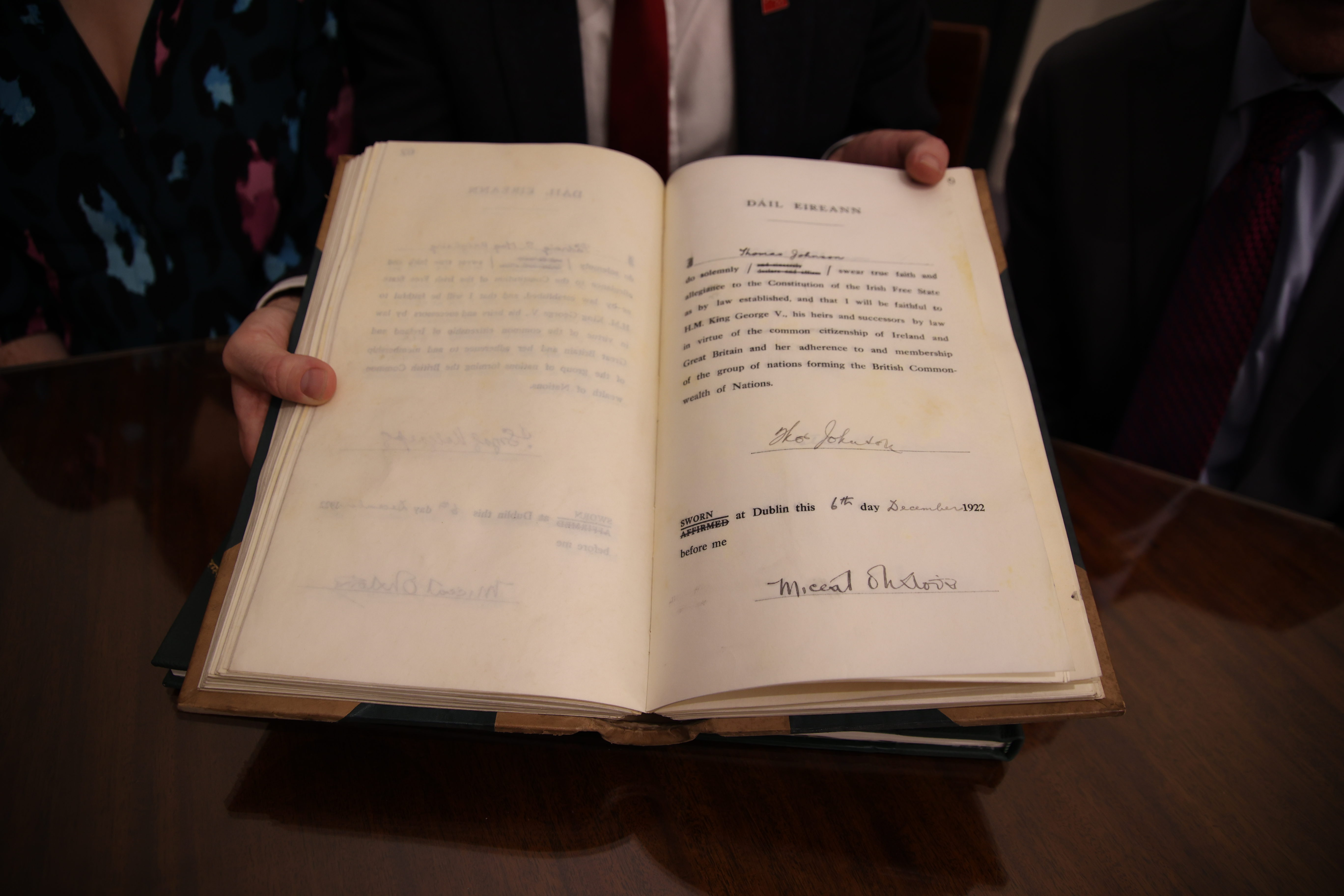
Thomas Johnson's signed written version of the Oath of Allegiance from 1922

The Oath of Allegiance (Irish: Mionn Dílse) was a provision in the 1921 Anglo-Irish Treaty and the 1922 Constitution of the Irish Free State which members of the Oireachtas, being members of Dáil Éireann (TDs) and of Seanad Éireann (senators), were required to swear before taking their seats. The presence of the Oath was one of the principal grounds for opposition to the Treaty, which led in turn to the 1922–1923 Irish Civil War. It remained in place until the enactment of the Constitution (Removal of Oath) Act 1933 on 3 May 1933.

== Text of the Oath ==
The Oath was included in Article 17 of the Irish Free State's 1922 Constitution. It read:

I N. N. do solemnly swear true faith and allegiance to the Constitution of the Irish Free State as by law established, and that I will be faithful to H.M. King George V, his heirs and successors by law in virtue of the common citizenship of Ireland with Great Britain and her adherence to and membership of the group of nations forming the British Commonwealth of Nations.

The words "allegiance to the Constitution of the Irish Free State" were taken from De Valera's preferred version, which read: "I N. N. do solemnly swear true faith and allegiance to the constitution of the Irish Free State, to the Treaty of Association, and to recognise the King of Great Britain as Head of Associated States."

The Oath had to be taken in front of the Governor-General of the Irish Free State or some other person authorised by him.

== Reaction ==
The oath was largely the work of Michael Collins, based in its open lines on a draft oath suggested by the President of the Republic, Éamon de Valera, and also on the oath of the Irish Republican Brotherhood. In fact, Collins cleared the oath with the IRB before proposing it during the treaty negotiations. By the standards of the oaths of allegiance to be found in other British Commonwealth Dominions, it was quite mild, with no direct personal Oath to the monarch, only an indirect oath of fidelity by virtue of the King's role in the treaty settlement as "King in Ireland", a figurehead position. The public perception among those who were hostile to the treaty was that it was an offensive oath due to its inclusion of the British monarch. In their view:

- The oath was an acceptance of a common citizenship between Ireland and Britain under King George and therefore was in total contravention to the oath to the Irish Republic which they had previously taken.
- They rebutted the argument that it was simply an oath to the constitution by pointing out that the constitution itself made the King head of state and it was therefore the same as an oath of allegiance to him directly.
- They felt that the people had voted for a party which claimed it would fight for a full Republic and they could not accept something lesser without a fresh mandate from the people.

In contrast to this Pro-treaty campaigners declared that:

- The Oath of Allegiance was actually "true faith and allegiance to the Constitution of the Irish Free State" (a line drafted by de Valera in his own proposed oath). The reference to the King involved a promise of fidelity, not an Oath of Allegiance.
- The fidelity to the King was not to him as British monarch but "in virtue of the common citizenship of Ireland with Great Britain and her adherence to and membership of the group of nations forming the British Commonwealth of nations", in other words, in his role as the symbol of the Treaty settlement, not as British King.

The Collins 22 Society later said of the anti-treaty position, the idea that the oath "was a direct oath to the Crown [was] a fact demonstrably incorrect by an examination of its wording. But in 1922 Ireland and beyond, it was the perception, not the reality, which influenced public debate on the issue."

As the Oath was effectively to the elected government in the Irish Free State, it was also described as the "Crown in Ireland". Opposition to this was based on the fact that it was not fully discussed and explained before the Anglo-Irish Treaty was signed in December 1921, and that many of the members of the second Dáil Éireann, elected without opposition in May 1921, had already sworn an Oath to uphold an Irish Republic.

== De Valera and abolition ==
When de Valera founded Fianna Fáil as the Republican Party in 1926, he and his party, though agreeing to contest elections, refused to take the Oath. However, the assassination of the Vice-President of the Executive Council, Kevin O'Higgins, led the Cumann na nGaedheal government under W. T. Cosgrave to introduce a law requiring all Dáil candidates to pledge that they would take the oath, otherwise they could not contest the election. In these circumstances, de Valera took the Oath, declaring that he was simply signing a piece of paper to be admitted to the Dáil. In May 1933, de Valera amended the Free State's constitution [at the time, amendable by simple majority in the Dáil], firstly to allow him to introduce any constitutional amendments irrespective of whether they clashed with the Anglo-Irish Treaty, then amended the constitution to remove Article 17 of the constitution which required the taking of the Oath. Robert Rowlette, who was elected in October 1933, was the first TD who did not have to take the Oath.

== Historical oaths of allegiance ==
An oath of allegiance to the English crown was required by the Irish Act of Supremacy since the time of King Henry VIII (1537). This oath was extended under King William and Mary to peers, members of the House of Commons, bishops, barristers and attorneys. Under Queen Anne holders of many civil and Military offices were required to take oaths of allegiance, supremacy, and abjuration, to attend an Anglican Church of Ireland eucharist service and to declare against the Roman Catholic beliefs in transubstantiation. These oaths were gradually changed over the years.

Under British rule, an oath of allegiance to the King was required for (prospective) barristers in Ireland who were called to the Bar. This excluded from the Bar a number of Nationalists who were not prepared to swear such an oath. For Catholics, the wording of this and other oaths required by the British administration proved difficult since they were denouncing the Pope.

=== Roman Catholic Relief Act 1782 ===
Following the Roman Catholic Relief Act 1782, which gave Catholic schools a legal footing, teachers were required to take an oath of allegiance to the British Crown. The oath was of a similar wording to that which was used by Catholics who served in the British military since 1774, previous oaths contained a profession of fidelity to the British Crown with a rejection of Papal authority.

=== Trinity College Dublin ===
The Roman Catholic Relief Act 1793 enacted by the Irish Parliament (which followed the British Roman Catholic Relief Act 1791), allowed Catholics to take degrees at Trinity College Dublin, by taking an oath of allegiance to the King but not supremacy which would negate their Catholic faith. It also affected Non-conformists who refused to accept the authority of the Crown and Anglican church.

=== Maynooth College ===
On the foundation in 1795 of St Patrick's College, Maynooth trustees, students and staff were required to swear an oath of allegiance to the King of Great Britain, since the college was in receipt of funding from the British Government. As a result, a number of clerics chose to study for the priesthood elsewhere. The Oath was compulsory until 1862 although it was common for students to ignore the oath by non-attendance at the ceremony.

=== Confederate Oath of 1642 ===
The Confederate Oath of Association was an oath of loyalty to Charles I, made at a time when the jurors were mostly engaged in a war with the royal "English Army for Ireland".

=== City corporations ===
There was an oath of allegiance required by members of the city corporations; this was an oath to the English monarch and accepted its supremacy.

=== United Kingdom House of Commons ===
The Oath of Allegiance was a barrier to Catholics in Ireland sitting in the House of Commons of the United Kingdom following the Acts of Union 1800. In 1828, following his victory in the 1828 County Clare by-election, Daniel O'Connell refused to take the Oath of Allegiance to the British Crown. Following the passage of the Roman Catholic Relief Act 1829, O'Connell took his seat in 1830 and was the first Irish Catholic to do so since 1689.

As of 2026, this oath of allegiance remains required before elected members of the House of Commons may take their seats and is one of the reasons for the abstentionist policy of Sinn Féin and other republican parties contesting seats in Northern Ireland.

== See also ==
- Oath of allegiance
- Pledge of Allegiance (United States)
