= Constitution (Amendment No. 16) Act 1929 =

The Constitution (Amendment No. 16) Act 1929 (previously bill no. 48 of 1928) was an Act of the Oireachtas of the Irish Free State amending the Constitution of the Irish Free State, extending the period during which the constitution could be amended without a referendum from 8 years (set in 1922) to 16 years. This period would have ended in 1938.

In 1937, the Constitution of the Irish Free State was repealed on the adoption of the Constitution of Ireland. The effect of Amendment No. 16, therefore, was that throughout the period of its operation it could be amended by ordinary legislation.

The Act substantially contributed to the lack of judicial review of legislation under the 1922 constitution, as it allowed constitutional amendment by ordinary legislation throughout the period of the Irish Free State. The validity of the Act was upheld in the Supreme Court decision State (Ryan) v. Lennon in 1934. By contrast, Article 51 of the Constitution of Ireland, which allowed for amendment of the constitution without referendum within the first three years of the term of the first president of Ireland, could not itself be amended.

The Act became obsolete on the repeal of the 1922 Constitution by the Constitution of Ireland in 1937, and was formally repealed by the Statute Law Revision Act 2016.
