= Constitution of the Irish Free State =

1922 Irish Free State constitution

The Constitution Committee meeting at the Shelbourne Hotel, Dublin.

The Constitution of the Irish Free State (Irish: Bunreacht Shaorstát Éireann) was adopted by Act of Dáil Éireann sitting as a constituent assembly on 25 October 1922. In accordance with Article 83 of the Constitution, the Irish Free State Constitution Act 1922 of the British Parliament, which came into effect upon receiving royal assent on 5 December 1922, provided that the Constitution would come into effect upon the issue of a Royal Proclamation, which was done on 6 December 1922. In 1937 the Constitution of the Irish Free State was replaced by the modern Constitution of Ireland following a referendum.

As enacted, the Constitution of the Irish Free State was firmly shaped by the requirements of the Anglo-Irish Treaty that had been negotiated between the British government and Irish leaders in 1921. However, following a change of government in 1932 and the adoption of the Statute of Westminster a series of amendments progressively removed many of the provisions that had been required by the Treaty.

The Constitution established a parliamentary system of government under a form of constitutional monarchy, and contained guarantees of certain fundamental rights. It was intended that the constitution would be a rigid document that, after an initial period, could be amended only by referendum. However, amendments were made to the Constitution's amendment procedure, so that all amendments could be and were in fact made by a simple Act of the Oireachtas (parliament).

== Background and enactment ==
=== Debate on whether a written constitution was required ===
Whether or not the Irish Free State would have a written constitution was the subject of some debate when the Irish Free State (Saorstát Éireann) Bill was introduced to the Provisional Parliament by President Cosgrave. The Labour leader, Thomas Johnson, remarked:

[T]here is no compulsion—so far as I can read in the Treaty—for a Constitution —a written Constitution—to be established at all.... It would be wiser, I suggest, to leave the enactment of a Constitution until there is something like quietude in the country.... I submit that it would be enough, in so far as any obligations that have been entered into, to re-enact, re-affirm, or ratify – whichever phrase you like – the Treaty itself, and let the Constitution grow out from that and thereby flatter our neighbours by following their own practice, in allowing the Constitution to develop by custom and usage.

— Dáil Éireann debate 18 September 1922

Another reason put forward not to adopt a written constitution was that constitutional conventions between members of the British Commonwealth were evolving and there was likely to be an Imperial Conference on the matter before long. The Labour leader also objected to the manner in which the Provisional Parliament was being described as a "constituent assembly" when in fact it was not acting of its "free volition" and thereby at liberty to adopt a constitution. He compared it to re-establishing Poynings' Law.

Nonetheless, there were counter arguments in favour of adopting a written constitution. Irish nationalists who fought the War of Independence believed themselves to be fighting on behalf of a newly formed state called the Irish Republic. The Irish Republic had its own president, an elected assembly called Dáil Éireann, and a judicial system in the form of the Dáil Courts. This republic was recognised by the revolutionary government in Russia. In the negotiations leading to the Anglo-Irish Treaty the British government insisted that the new Irish state must remain within the Commonwealth and not be a republic. Furthermore, while the Irish Republic had a constitution, of sorts, in the form of the Dáil Constitution, this was a very brief document and had been intended to be only provisional. It was therefore the prevalent view that when, in 1921, the British government agreed to the creation of a largely independent Irish state, that a new constitution was needed. The Anglo-Irish Treaty made a number of requirements of the new constitution. Among these were that:

- the new state would be called the Irish Free State and would be a dominion of the British Commonwealth;
- the King would be the head of state and would be represented by a Governor General;
- members of the Oireachtas (parliament) would swear an oath of allegiance to the Irish Free State and declare their fidelity to the King. This Free State Oath of Allegiance was controversial; and
- Northern Ireland would be included in the Irish Free State unless its Parliament decided to opt out (which it did).

=== Legislative competence ===
On 31 March 1922, an act of the United Kingdom Parliament called the Irish Free State (Agreement) Act 1922 was passed. It gave the force of law to the Anglo-Irish Treaty. It also provided by for the election of a body to be called the "House of the Parliament", sometimes called the "Provisional Parliament", to which the Provisional Government established under that act would be responsible. The act gave no power to the Provisional Parliament to enact a constitution for the Irish Free State. In due course, "the House of the Parliament," provided for by that act, was elected and met on 9 September 1922, and calling itself Dáil Éireann, proceeded to sit as a constituent assembly for the settlement of what became the Constitution of the Irish Free State.

=== Constitution Committee ===
Shortly after the British evacuated their troops from Dublin Castle in January 1922, Michael Collins set about establishing a committee to draft a new constitution for the nascent Irish Free State which would come into being in December 1922. Mr Collins chaired the first meeting of that committee and at that point (he died before the constitution was finalised) was its chairman. Darrell Figgis, the vice-chairman became acting chair. The committee produced three draft texts, designated A, B and C. A was signed by Figgis, James McNeill and John O'Byrne. B was signed by James G. Douglas, C.J. France and Hugh Kennedy and it differed substantially from A only in proposals regarding the Executive. This difference was intended by Douglas to permit the anti-treaty faction a say in the final proposed constitution before its submission to the British Government. As such it was, according to Douglas, an attempt to ameliorate the pro- and anti-treaty split. Draft C was the most novel of the three. It was signed by Alfred O'Rahilly and James Murnaghan, and provided for the possibility of representation for the people of the northern counties in the Dáil in the event of that area opting out of the proposed free state. The Irish text was then drafted as a translation of the English text. The Irish language version was drafted by a committee which included the Minister for Education, Eoin MacNeill; the Leas-Cheann Comhairle (deputy speaker), Pádraic Ó Máille; the Clerk of the Dáil, Colm Ó Murchadha; Piaras Béaslaí; Liam Ó Rinn and Professors Osborn Bergin and T. F. O'Rahilly.

=== Method of adoption ===
As a practical matter, the process of drafting the constitution began with the establishment by Michael Collins of the committee to draft a new constitution. This started shortly after the Provisional Government was established in January 1922. In subsequent months members of the Provisional Government negotiated the draft constitution with the British authorities. After that process was completed, a bill entitled the Constitution of the Irish Free State (Saorstát Éireann) Bill was introduced into Dáil Éireann (the 3rd Dáil) in September 1922, the Dáil sitting as a "constituent assembly". It was enacted by the 3rd Dáil on 25 October 1922.

Article 83 of the constitution provided that "The passing and adoption of this Constitution by the Constituent Assembly and the British Parliament shall be announced as soon as may be, and not later than the sixth day of December, Nineteen hundred and twenty-two, by Proclamation of His Majesty, and this Constitution shall come into operation on the issue of such Proclamation."

The British Parliament then passed the Irish Free State Constitution Act 1922, which came into force on 5 December 1922. This act recited that the House of Parliament constituted pursuant to the Irish Free State (Agreement) Act, 1922, sitting as a constituent assembly for the settlement of the Constitution of the Irish Free State, had passed the measure set forth in the schedule to the act, (namely the constitution adopted by Dáil Éireann), which it then referred to as "the Constituent Act". It then provided that the Constituent Act should be the Constitution of the Irish Free State and should come into operation on the same being proclaimed by His Majesty in accordance with Article 83 of the constitution.

The Royal Proclamation bringing the constitution into force was made on 6 December 1922. Referring to the constitution as a "Measure" whereby the constitution appearing as the First Schedule to the Constituent Act was declared to be the Constitution of the Irish Free State, the Royal Proclamation went on to "announce and proclaim that the Constitution of the Irish Free State as the same was passed and adopted by the said Constituent Assembly has been passed and adopted by Parliament". The 6 December 1922 was the latest possible date allowed for by the Anglo-Irish Treaty for the continued authority of the Provisional Government set up by the treaty pending "the constitution of a Parliament and Government of the Irish Free State". On this date also the members of the Dáil took the Oath of Allegiance, and nominated the members of the Executive Council (the cabinet).

=== Incorporation of the treaty ===
The Constitution of the Irish Free State (Saorstát Éireann) Act 1922 contained two schedules. One schedule contained the new constitution, and the other the text of the Anglo-Irish Treaty. As enacted in 1922, Section 2 of the act provided for the supremacy of the treaty's provisions, voiding any part of the Constitution or other Free State law that was "repugnant" to it. Similarly, both Section 2 of the act and Article 50 of the constitution provided that no constitutional amendment would stand so far as it violated the terms of the treaty.

The enactment by the British Parliament of the Statute of Westminster in 1931 changed the legal framework as understood by the British. The statute was designed to increase the legislative autonomy of all the dominions. In contrast with certain of the other dominions, the statute did not specifically place any reservation on this power as exercisable by the Free State, and thus granted it the power to alter Irish law in any way it chose. The new government under Éamon de Valera soon used this new freedom to enact the Constitution (Removal of Oath) Act 1933. Besides abolishing the Oath of Allegiance, a requirement of the Anglo-Irish Treaty, the act also expressly repealed the provisions both of the constitution proper and of the Constitution of the Irish Free State (Saorstát Éireann) Act 1922 that required compliance with the treaty. Subsequent legislation soon began to dismantle other constitutional provisions that had been required or limited by the treaty's terms.

=== Constitution's authority ===
Under British constitutional legal theory, the Constitution of the Irish Free State (Saorstát Éireann) Act 1922 held the force of law because of the enactment of the United Kingdom's Irish Free State Constitution Act 1922. However, under Irish law the constitution "derived its authority not from the Act of the imperial parliament passed on the 5th December, 1922, or from the proclamation made on the 6th December, 1922, but from the Act of Dáil Éireann sitting as a constituent assembly passed on the 25th October, 1922".

== Main provisions ==
=== Structure ===
As enacted, the Constitution proper consisted of 83 separate articles, totalling around 7,600 words. The Constitution of the Irish Free State (Saorstát Éireann) Act 1922 consisted of only a short preamble and three short sections, but was a far longer document because, as noted above, it included as schedules the full text of both the constitution proper and the Anglo-Irish Treaty.

The articles of the Constitution proper were not grouped together under headings, save for the final ten articles (which came under the title of "Transitory Provisions"). However, divided by subject matter the articles of the Constitution broke down roughly as follows:

- Introductory provisions (Arts. 1–4)
- Fundamental rights (Arts. 5–10)
- Legislature (Arts. 13–46)
  - Dáil Éireann (Arts. 26–29)
  - The Senate (Arts. 30–34)
- Initiative and referendum (Arts. 47–48)
- Constitutional amendments (Art. 50)
- Cabinet (Arts. 51–59)
- Governor-General (Art. 60)
- Regulation of state finances (Arts. 61–63)
- Courts (Arts. 64–72)
- Transitory Provisions (Arts. 73–83)

=== Preamble ===
The constitution itself had no preamble. However, the Constitution of the Irish Free State (Saorstát Éireann) Act 1922 began with the following words:

Dáil Éireann sitting as a Constituent Assembly in this Provisional Parliament, acknowledging that all lawful authority comes from God to the people and in the confidence that the National life and unity of Ireland shall thus be restored, hereby proclaims the establishment of The Irish Free State (otherwise called Saorstát Éireann) and in the exercise of undoubted right, decrees and enacts as follows:—

=== Characteristics of the state ===
- Commonwealth membership: Article 1 stated that the state would be a "co-equal member" of the British Commonwealth.
- Popular sovereignty: It was stated that the "all powers of government... are derived from the people of Ireland" (Article 2).
- Citizenship: The constitution provided that those living in the state at the time of its coming into force who had been born in Ireland, had parents born in Ireland or had been resident in the state for seven years would become citizens. However anyone who was the citizen of another state could choose not to become an Irish citizen (Article 3).
- National language: It was provided that Irish was the "National Language" but English was "equally recognised as an official language" (Article 4). The constitution included the terms Saorstát Éireann (as one name for the Irish Free State), Oireachtas (for the legislature), and Dáil Éireann and Seanad Éireann (for the houses of the legislature), all of which were intended for use even in English speech.

=== Individual rights ===
Unlike the then constitutions of Australia and Canada, the constitution included a bill of rights, in Articles 6–10. Rights were also protected by a number of provisions contained in other articles.

- Prohibition of titles of nobility: It was provided that no title of honour, including knighthoods and peerages, could be conferred on an Irish citizen in respect of any services rendered in or in relation to the Irish Free State without the consent of the Executive Council (Article 5).
- Liberty and habeas corpus: Article 6 provided that no-one could be deprived of liberty except in accordance with the law, and that habeas corpus would be upheld. The military forces were granted an exemption from this article during time of war or rebellion.
- Inviolability of the home: The home could not be entered except in accordance with the law (Article 7).
- Freedom of conscience and worship: Protected by Article 9 subject to "public order and morality" (Article 8).
- Prohibition of establishment: The state could not "endow" any religion (Article 8).
- Religious discrimination: The state could not discriminate on religious grounds (Article 8).
- Freedom of speech, assembly and association: All guaranteed subject to "public morality". Laws regulating freedom of assembly and association could not be discriminatory (Article 9).
- Right to education: Free elementary education guaranteed to all citizens (Article 10).
- Trial by jury: Guaranteed by Article 72, which granted an exemption for minor offences and offences triable by court martial.

The constitution empowered the courts to strike down laws they found to be unconstitutional. However judicial review of legislation was made largely meaningless by the ease with which the Oireachtas could alter the constitution. Furthermore, as the state had only recently seceded from the UK, Irish judges were trained in British jurisprudence. To this tradition, founded on deference to the legislature and parliamentary sovereignty, constitutional review was an alien concept. This meant that despite the adoption of a new, more rigid constitution in 1937, constitutional review did not become a significant feature of Irish jurisprudence until the 1960s. During the entire period of the Free State, only two pieces of legislation were declared by the courts to be unconstitutional.

The Free State had significant problems with public order in early years. It was founded during the Irish Civil War which did not come to an end until May 1923, and thereafter there were continuing problems of public disorder and subversive activities by the Irish Republican Army (IRA). This situation led to an erosion of civil rights in the new state. During the Civil War a law provided the death penalty for the crime of unlawful possession of a firearm, and more than seventy people were executed for the offence. Strong security measures continued to be used after the war's conclusion; these included internment of former rebels and the punishment of flogging for arson and armed robbery, introduced in 1924.

==== Article 2A ====
In 1931, acting in response to IRA violence, the Oireachtas adopted Amendment No. 17 of the constitution. This added a sweeping set of provisions called Article 2A to the constitution. Article 2A was very large, consisting of five parts and 34 sections. Among other provisions it granted powers of arrest, detention and trial of people before military tribunals not bound by normal rules of evidence, despite the fact that many crimes triable before the tribunals carried a mandatory death sentence. To protect itself from being undermined by the courts, Article 2A was drafted to state that it took precedence over all other provisions of the constitution (save Article 1).

The provisions for military tribunals were challenged in 1935 in the case of The State (Ryan) v. Lennon. In this case the majority of the Supreme Court reluctantly held that, because Amendment No. 17 had been duly adopted in accordance with the correct procedure, it was not open to the judges to strike it down. However Chief Justice Kennedy disagreed, arguing, in a dissenting opinion, that the Article 2A violated natural law.

=== Economic and social rights ===
The drafting committee considered the inclusion of economic and social rights in the Irish constitution. C.J. France proposed provisions to ensure state control of natural resources. He further proposed that the state would capture the "unearned increment" arising from land value increases, thereby checking speculation in land and promoting investment in industrial development. During the parliamentary debates on the constitution, Labour TDs such as Tom Johnson and T.J. O’Connell proposed the inclusion of modest welfare measures as well as provisions to protect children's rights.

These proposals met with opposition. The economist, George O’Brien, and Archbishop Harty both questioned the social provisions' economic viability as well as their political viability given their potential to alienate conservative, land-owning supporters of the Treaty. British law officers further objected to the "Soviet character" of the constitution's declaration of "economic sovereignty". The Provisional Government dropped the offending provisions.

Ultimately, the 1922 Constitution was limited to two "programmatic declarations" only, one specifying a pre-existing right to elementary education (Article 10) and the other providing for the possibility of state ownership of national resources (Article 11).

=== Organs of government ===
The constitution provided for a parliamentary system of government. The legislature was called the Oireachtas, consisting of the monarch and two houses: the Chamber of Deputies, to be known generally as Dáil Éireann, was established as the lower house, and the Senate, to be known generally as Seanad Éireann, as the upper house. The Seanad had only limited powers of delay so the Dáil was the dominant house.

Executive authority was vested in the King and exercised by the Governor-General of the Irish Free State, who would appoint an Executive Council to "aid and advise" him. The Executive Council was headed by a prime minister, the President of the Executive Council. In practice, however, the President was nominated by the Dáil and formally appointed by the Governor-General. The President then nominated the remaining members of the Executive Council, and designated one of its members as Vice-President of the Executive Council, or deputy prime minister. The Dáil was empowered to dismiss it by a vote of no confidence. The Constitution stipulated that executive authority was to be exercised in accordance with the laws and conventions of the Dominion of Canada. Thus, with few exceptions, the Governor-General was bound by convention to act on the Executive Council's advice.

The constitution provided that the judiciary would consist of the Supreme Court, the High Court, and any lower courts established by law.

=== Initiative and referendum ===
As originally adopted the constitution contained (in Articles 47, 48 and 50) innovative provisions for direct democracy but, owing to constitutional amendments, these provisions were never permitted to come into effect. The provisions stated that the referendum and initiative would operate on the same franchise as the Dáil; this was universal suffrage beginning at the age of 21. The constitution provided for three forms of direct democracy:

- Constitutional referendum: After an initial period all constitutional amendments would be subject to a mandatory, binding referendum. An amendment would not be deemed to have been passed unless at least a majority of registered voters participated in the referendum and the votes in favour were equal to either: (1) a majority of all eligible voters, or (2) a two-thirds majority of votes cast. This provision was stricter than the modern Constitution of Ireland, which merely requires a majority of votes cast.
- Veto of legislation: Once a bill had been approved by both houses of the Oireachtas (or just by the Dáil, if it had over-ridden the Senate) its enactment into law could be suspended if, within seven days, either a majority of the Senate or 40% of all members of the Dáil so requested. There would then be a further period of ninety days within which either 5% of all registered voters, or a 60% majority in the Senate, could demand a referendum on the bill. The referendum would be decided by a majority of votes cast. If rejected the bill would not become law. These provisions did not apply to money bills or bills declared by both houses to be "necessary for the immediate preservation of the public peace, health or safety".
- Initiative: Ordinary citizens would have the right, through an initiative process, to draft both constitutional amendments and ordinary laws, and insist that they be submitted to a referendum. The constitution provided a general frame-work for how the initiative would work, empowering the Oireachtas to fill in the details with legislation. It required that a proposal could be initiated by a petition of 50,000 registered voters. Once initiated a proposal would be referred to the Oireachtas, but if the Oireachtas did not adopt the law it would be obliged to submit it to a binding referendum. The constitution gave the Oireachtas two years to adopt a law allowing voters to introduce initiatives. However, after this time voters had power to force the issue. This is because the initiative process itself could then by made the subject of an initiative. After two years the introduction of an initiative process would be put to a referendum if demanded by a petition of not less than 75,000 voters on the register (not more than fifteen thousand of whom could be voters in any one constituency).

The Achilles' heel of the direct democracy provisions was contained in Article 50 which provided that, for eight years after the constitution came into force, the Oireachtas could amend the constitution without a referendum. As interpreted by the courts, this even included the power to amend the article itself and extend this period.

The Oireachtas did not adopt legislation providing for the initiative within the two years stipulated by the constitution and, eventually, a petition of 96,000 signatures was gathered by the opposition to trigger a referendum forcing the Oireachtas to introduce an initiative process. The Oireachtas responded by removing all provisions for direct democracy from the constitution, save for the requirement that, once the eight-year transitional period had passed, it would be necessary to hold referendums on all constitutional amendments. Then in 1929 the Oireachtas extended this period to sixteen years. This meant that, by the time the constitution was replaced in 1937, the provisions for the constitutional referendum had still not come into force.

== Amendments ==
=== Method of amendment ===
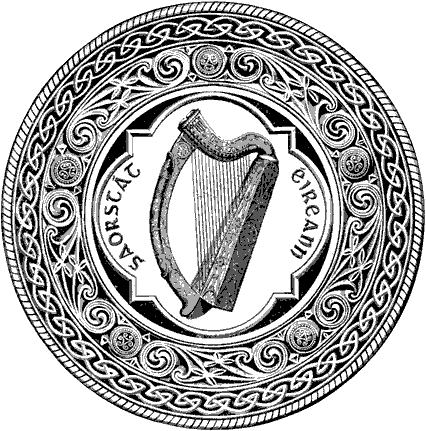
The Great Seal of the Irish Free State, used in the state from 1924.

The procedure for adopting constitutional amendments was laid out in Article 50. This foresaw that amendments would first be approved by both houses of the Oireachtas, then submitted to a referendum, and finally receive royal assent from the Governor-General. However, as already noted, the requirement for a referendum was postponed by the Oireachtas so that during the entire period of the Irish Free State the Constitution could be amended by means of an ordinary law. As noted above it was originally provided that any amendments that violated the Anglo-Irish Treaty would be inadmissible, but this sole restriction was removed in 1933.

The Oireachtas readily used its powers of amendment so that, during the 15 years of the Constitution's operation, 25 formal constitutional amendments were made. This can be contrasted with the fact that, during its first 60 years, the current Constitution of Ireland was amended only 16 times. In addition to the adoption of constitutional amendments, the courts ruled that the Oireachtas could also implicitly amend the constitution. When the Oireachtas adopted the Public Safety Act 1927, which affected civil rights, it included a section requiring that should the act be found to be unconstitutional it would be treated as a constitutional amendment. Section 3 of the act provided that:

Every provision of this Act which is in contravention of any provision of the Constitution shall to the extent of such contravention operate and have effect as an amendment [...] of the Constitution.

In the Attorney General v. McBride (1928) it was ruled that this kind of section was unnecessary because even if a law did not contain such a provision it could be interpreted as a tacit amendment of the constitution anyway, owing to the doctrine of implied repeal. This meant that, in addition to formal amendments, almost any act of the Oireachtas could be considered an amendment of the constitution. The long process of ad hoc amendment that occurred until 1937 meant that, by the time it was replaced that, according to President (of the Executive Council) Éamon de Valera, the constitution had become a "tattered and torn affair".

While Article 50 provided for the amendment of the constitution proper, there was no explicit provision in any law for the amendment of the Constitution of the Irish Free State (Saorstát Éireann) Act 1922. Some jurists therefore maintained that the Oireachtas did not have power to amend the Act; rather, if it were possible to alter the law at all, it might be necessary to request the British Parliament to do so, or to elect another constituent assembly. Chief Justice Kennedy was among those who took the view that the act could not be altered by the Oireachtas. Nonetheless, changes were eventually made to the act, when the Oireachtas passed the Constitution (Removal of Oath) Act 1933, and it was superseded with the adoption of the 1937 constitution. The 1922 Act was formally repealed by the Statute Law Revision Act 2007.

When the new constitution was drafted lessons had been learned from the Free State constitution. It too granted the Oireachtas a temporary power to make constitutional amendments by ordinary law, but, unlike the Free State constitution, it expressly forbade the legislature from using this power to extend the transitional period. Article 46 of the new constitution required that constitutional amendments be approved by referendum while Article 51 of the Transitory Provisions suspended this requirement for an initial three years (beginning when the first president assumed office). However, Article 51 forbade the legislature from amending either itself or Article 46. In the event the Oireachtas used its transitional power only twice, when it adopted the First Amendment and the Second Amendment. The new constitution then settled down and was not amended again for thirty years. Another difference from the Free State constitution is that the modern constitution requires constitutional amendments to be expressly identified as such. Every amendment must have the long title "An Act to amend the Constitution".

=== Subjects of amendments ===
Some amendments made minor changes, such as removing the requirement that elections occur on a public holiday, but others were more radical. These included extending the term of the Dáil in 1927, the abolition of the initiative and of direct elections to the Senate in 1928, extending the period during which the Oireachtas could amend the constitution in 1928, and the introduction of provisions for trial by military tribunals in 1931. From 1933 onwards a series of further amendments were made that gradually dismantled the Treaty settlement by, for example, abolishing the Oath of Allegiance and the office of Governor General. Because a majority of its members disagreed with this process, the Senate was abolished in 1936.

=== List of amendments ===
In each case but one, the acts amending the Constitution were titled in the form Constitution (Amendment No. 1) Act 1925. The exception is Constitution (Removal of Oath) Act 1933, which does not have a number. The acts are listed below in order of their enactment, but the numbering of constitutional amendments coincides with the order in which they were introduced as bills, so that the sequence does not follow in strict order. There were no Amendments numbered 18, 19 or 25. In addition, "ordinary" Acts of the Oireachtas could modify the constitution. The amendments effected by these acts all lapsed in 1937 with the repeal of the Constitution of the Irish Free State and adoption of the Constitution of Ireland, and the acts themselves were formally repealed by the Statute Law Revision Act 2016.

No.	Date	Change
No. 1	11 July 1925	Provided that the first Senators would vacate office in December 1925, made changes relating to the terms of office of senators, and the date on which senatorial elections were to be held.
No. 3	4 March 1927	Removed the requirement that the day of any general election would be declared a public holiday.
No. 4	4 March 1927	Extended the maximum term of the Dáil from four to six years.
No. 2	19 March 1927	Introduced a system of automatic re-election of the Ceann Comhairle (Chairman of the Dáil) in a general election.
No. 5	5 May 1927	Increased the maximum membership of the Executive Council from seven to twelve members.
No. 10	12 July 1928	Removed referendums on bills and petitions.
No. 6	23 July 1928	Replaced the direct election of the Seanad with a system of indirect election.
No. 13	23 July 1928	Extended the power of delay of the Seanad over legislation from nine months to twenty months. This was intended to compensate the Seanad for the loss of its right to force a referendum on certain bills that had been removed by Amendment No. 6.
No. 8	25 October 1928	Reduced the age of eligibility for senators from 35 to 30.
No. 9	25 October 1928	Altered provisions relating to the procedure for nominating candidates to stand in senatorial elections.
No. 7	30 October 1928	Reduced the term of office of senators from twelve to nine years.
No. 14	14 May 1929	Clarified a technical matter relating to the relationship between the two houses of the Oireachtas.
No. 15	14 May 1929	Permitted one member of the Executive Council to be a senator, where previously it had been required that all be members of the Dáil. However, the president, vice-president and minister for finance were required to be members of the Dáil.
No. 16	14 May 1929	Extended the period during which amendments of the constitution could be made by ordinary legislation from eight to sixteen years.
No. 11	17 December 1929	Altered the method for filling casual vacancies in the Seanad by providing for a vote of both houses rather than just the Seanad.
No. 12	24 March 1930	Altered provisions relating to the Committee of Privileges that had authority to resolves disputes over the definition of a money bill.
No. 17	17 October 1931	Introduced Article 2A, which included provisions for trial by military tribunals.
	3 May 1933	Constitution (Removal of Oath) Act 1933; Abolished the Oath of Allegiance and removed requirements that the constitution and laws of the Free State be compatible with the Anglo-Irish Treaty. This involved repealing Section 2 of the Constitution of the Irish Free State (Saorstát Éireann) Act 1922, as well as altering provisions of the constitution.
No. 20	2 November 1933	Transferred the Governor General's role in recommending appropriations of money to the Dáil on the advice of the Executive Council directly to the Executive Council.
No. 21	2 November 1933	Removed provisions granting the Governor-General the right to veto bills or reserve them "for the King's pleasure" by referring them to London.
No. 22	16 November 1933	Abolished the right of appeal to the Judicial Committee of the Privy Council in London.
No. 26	5 April 1935	Made a technical change to Article 3, which dealt with citizenship.
No. 23	24 April 1936	Abolished the two university constituencies in the Dáil.
No. 24	29 May 1936	Abolished Seanad Éireann.
No. 27	11 December 1936	Abolished the office of Governor-General and removed all reference to the King from the constitution. The functions of the Governor-General were transferred to various other branches of government.
