= Statute Law Revision Act 2016 =

Oireachtas
- Long title: An Act to promote the revision of statute law by repealing enactments which have ceased to be in force or have become unnecessary and to amend the Statute Law Revision Act 2007 .
- Citation: No. 20 of 2016
- Enacted by: Dáil Éireann
- Signed: 26 December 2016
- Commenced: 26 December 2016
- Status: Current legislation

The Statute Law Revision Act 2016 is a Statute Law Revision Act enacted by the Oireachtas in Ireland to review Acts of the Oireachtas passed from 1922 to 1950. It also amended the Statute Law Revision Act 2007 to revive the incorporation Act of the Association for Promoting Christian Knowledge, which was accidentally repealed the Statute Law Revision Act 2007. The Act is part of the Statute Law Revision Programme which has also seen the enactment of statute law revision legislation between 2005 and 2016.

== Scope ==
The Act repealed 297 of the 707 in force Acts dating from 1922 to 1950, or about 42% of the total such Acts. It was described by the Minister for Public Expenditure and Reform as "the first comprehensive review of Acts enacted by the Oireachtas "
