= Irish head of state from 1922 to 1949 =

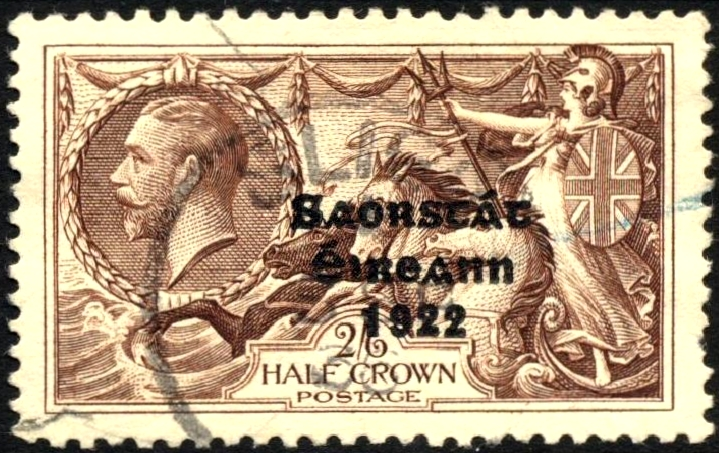
British stamp depicting George V with "Irish Free State 1922" overprint

The state known today as Ireland is the successor state to the Irish Free State, which existed from December 1922 to December 1937. At its foundation, the Irish Free State was, in accordance with its constitution and the terms of the Anglo-Irish Treaty, governed as a constitutional monarchy and British dominion with the British monarch as head of state. The monarch was represented in the Irish Free State by the governor-general, who performed most of the monarch's duties based on the advice of elected Irish officials.

The Statute of Westminster, passed in 1931, granted expanded sovereignty to the dominions of the British Commonwealth, and permitted the Irish state to amend its constitution and legislate outside the terms of the Treaty. The Executive Authority (External Relations) Act 1936, enacted in response to the abdication of Edward VIII, removed the role of the monarch for all internal purposes, leaving him only a few formal duties in foreign relations as a "symbol of cooperation" with other Commonwealth nations. The Constitution of Ireland, which took effect in December 1937, established the position of president of Ireland, with the office first filled in June 1938, but the monarch retained his role in foreign affairs, leaving open the question of which of the two figures was the formal head of state. The Republic of Ireland Act 1948 ended the statutory position of the British monarch for external purposes and assigned those duties to the president, taking effect in April 1949, from which point Ireland was inarguably a republic.

== Background ==
The Anglo-Irish Treaty was agreed upon to end the 1919–1921 Irish War of Independence fought between Irish revolutionaries who favored an Irish Republic and the United Kingdom of Great Britain and Ireland. The treaty provided for the Irish Free State, which excluded Northern Ireland, as an autonomous and self-governing dominion of the British Commonwealth, with the British monarch as head of state, in the same manner as in Canada and Australia. The treaty also mandated that members of the new Irish parliament would have to take an oath of allegiance that promised fidelity to George V and his heirs.

The disestablishment of the Irish Republic declared in 1919, the imposition of even a constitutional monarchy, and the continued ties to Great Britain were particularly contentious for many Irish nationalists. Even the Treaty's supporters viewed it as a compromise imposed on the Irish by their inability to achieve full independence through military means: Michael Collins, the republican leader who had led the Irish negotiating team, argued that it gave "not the ultimate freedom that all nations aspire and develop, but the freedom to achieve freedom."

The Treaty was fiercely debated in the 2nd Dáil, the Irish Republic's revolutionary parliament. Éamon de Valera, the Republic's President, opposed the proposed dominion status for Ireland; instead, he advocated for a relationship he called external association, under which Ireland would be "associated" with the rest of the British Commonwealth and would "recognise His Britannic Majesty as head of the Association" – but not as Ireland's King or head of state.

Nevertheless, the Dáil narrowly approved the treaty, and de Valera resigned in protest. Pro-Treaty forces won the ensuing election and civil war, and the Free State's new constitution incorporated the monarchial elements mandated by the Treaty.

== Irish Free State ==
Monarchy of the Irish Free State
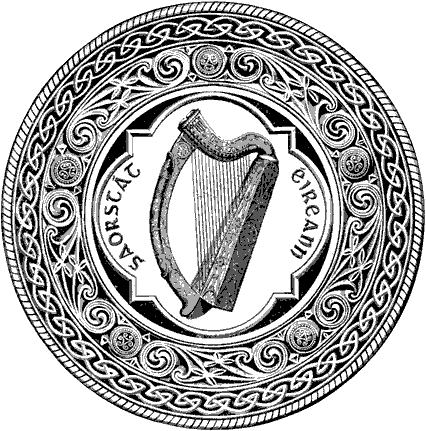
- Great Seal of the Irish Free State

Details
- Style: His Majesty
- First monarch: George V
- Last monarch: George VI
- Formed: 6 December 1922
- Abolished: 29 December 1937

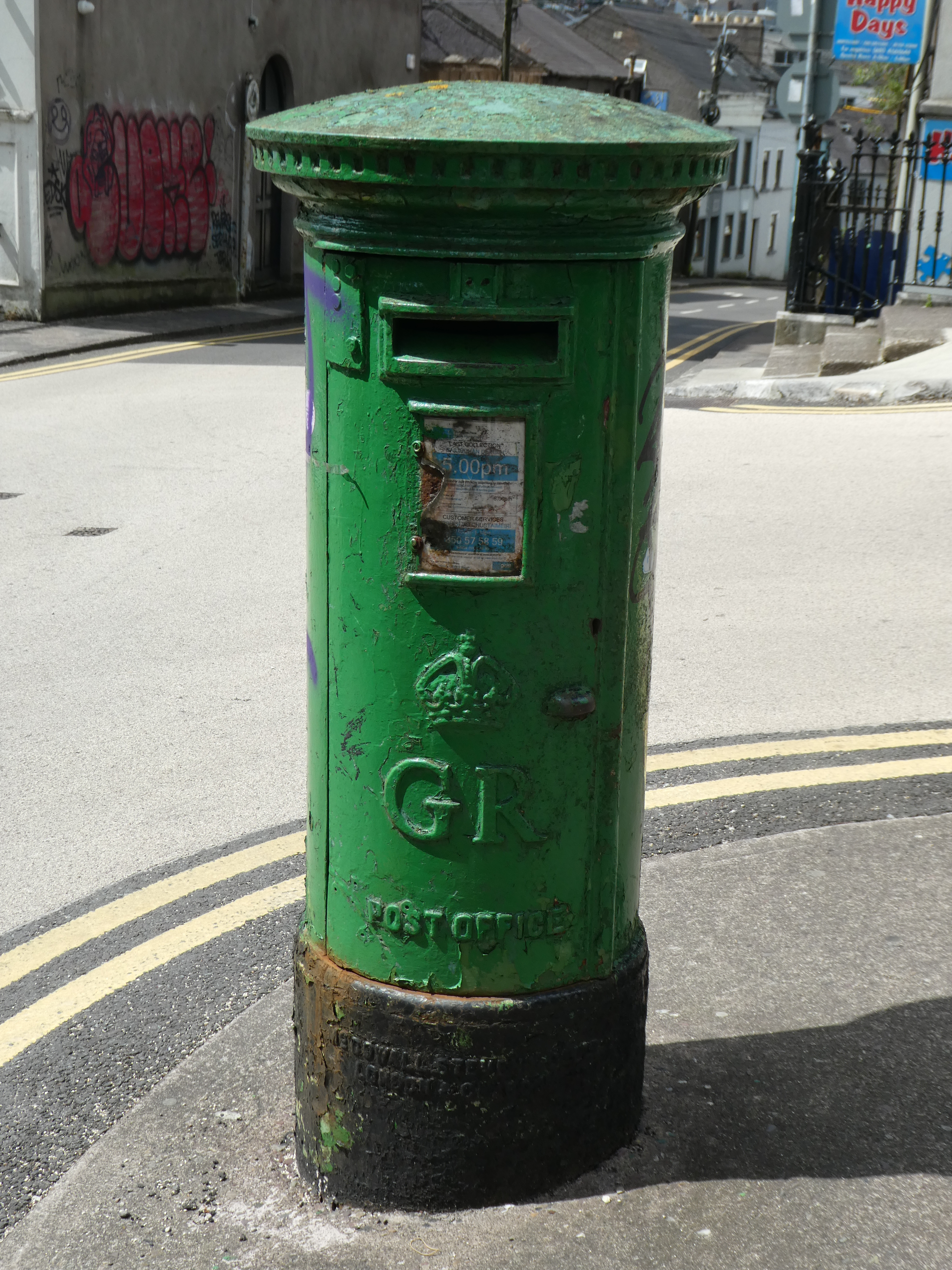
Pillarbox with monogram of George V in Cork. Like almost all pre-1922 postboxes in the Free State, it was originally red, but was overpainted in green, the Irish national colour.

The new Irish Free State thus established was a form of constitutional monarchy, a Dominion with the same monarch as the United Kingdom and other states within the British Commonwealth. Under its constitution, the King had functions that included the exercise of executive authority of the state, the appointment of the cabinet, the dissolution of the legislature, and the promulgation of laws. However, all of these were delegated to a representative called the Governor-General of the Irish Free State. The representative's title was not actually specified in the Treaty, and Collins considered a number of alternatives, including Commissioner of the British Commonwealth and President of Ireland. However, the Free State government ultimately settled on governor-general because it was the same title used by the corresponding officials in other Dominions. The office's Irish language title was Seanascal, meaning "high steward" or "seneschal", which was later used in English.

As was the case in all Dominions, by convention the governor-general acted on the advice of elected officials. For the most part, this advice came from Irish officials, and on a day-to-day basis the governor-general played a ceremonial role in the Irish Free State similar to the one the King played in the United Kingdom. (Notably, the head of government, who in practice held the most powerful position in the State, held the title President of the Executive Council rather than Prime Minister as in other Dominions.)

At the Free State's inception, however, the governor-general served an additional role as the British government's agent, as was true in other Dominions as well. This meant that all official correspondence between the British and Irish governments went through the governor-general and that he had access to British government papers. It also meant that he could receive secret instructions from the British government and so, for example, on assuming office Tim Healy was formally advised by the British government to veto any law that attempted to abolish the Oath of Allegiance. However, no such law was passed during Healy's term of office, and in practice the governor-general never received conflicting advice from Irish and British officials during the existence of the Free State.

== Duties and functions ==
Under the original constitution of the Irish Free State in 1922, the monarch had a number of formal duties:

- Executive authority: The executive authority of the state was formally vested in the monarch but exercised by the governor-general. Under Article 51, executive authority was to be exercised in accordance with Canadian practice. Thus, with few exceptions, the governor-general was bound to act on the advice of the Executive Council.
- Appointment of the cabinet: The President of the Executive Council (prime minister) was appointed by governor-general after being selected by Dáil Éireann (the lower house of parliament). The remaining ministers were appointed on the nomination of the president, subject to a vote of consent in the Dáil.
- Appointment of Military Officers: The monarch had the formal duty of appointing military officers, although this was done on the advice of Irish government officials and the Governor-General. The Irish Defence Forces were established as Crown Forces. The King's Local Defence Force as stated in the minutes of the Treaty.
- Convention and dissolution of the legislature: The governor-general, on behalf of the monarch, convened and dissolved the Oireachtas on the advice of the Executive Council.
- Signing bills into law: The monarch was formally, along with the Dáil and the Senate, one of three tiers of the Oireachtas. No bill could become law until it received the Royal Assent, which was given by the governor-general on behalf of the monarch. The governor-general theoretically had the right to veto a bill or reserve it "for the signification of the King's pleasure", in effect postponing a decision on whether or not to enact the bill, for a maximum of one year. However neither of these two actions was ever taken.
- Appointment of judges: All judges were appointed by the governor-general, on the advice of the Executive Council.
- Representing the state in foreign affairs: The monarch accredited ambassadors and received the letters of credence of foreign diplomats; ministers signed international treaties in his name. The role of the monarch in the Free State's foreign affairs was the only function retained by him after the constitutional changes of 1936.

=== Oath of Allegiance ===
The Oath of Allegiance was included in Article 17 of the Irish Free State's 1922 Constitution. It read:

I (name) do solemnly swear true faith and allegiance to the Constitution of the Irish Free State as by law established, and that I will be faithful to His Majesty King George V, his heirs and successors by law in virtue of the common citizenship of Ireland with Great Britain and her adherence to and membership of the group of nations forming the British Commonwealth of Nations.

The words "allegiance to the Constitution of the Irish Free State" were taken from De Valera's preferred version, which read: "I (name) do solemnly swear true faith and allegiance to the constitution of the Irish Free State, to the Treaty of Association, and to recognise the King of Great Britain as Head of Associated States".

== Diminishing role of monarchy ==
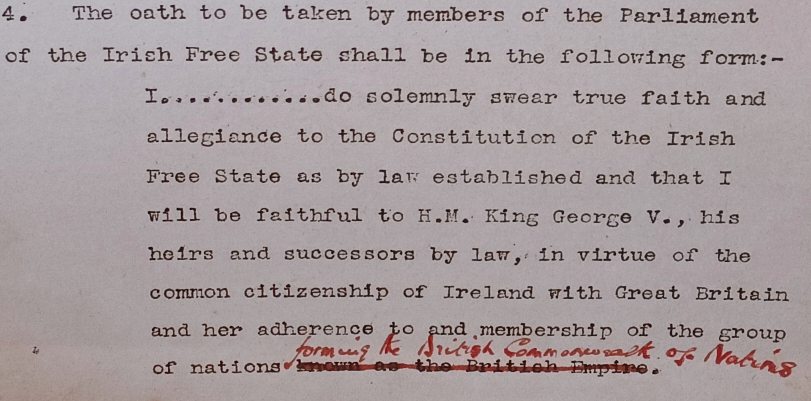
Draft of the 1921 Anglo-Irish Treaty, with "British Empire" crossed out and "British Commonwealth of Nations" added by hand.

The creation of the Irish Free State came at a time when all the Dominions of the British Empire were increasingly asserting their place as partners with the United Kingdom rather than its colonies, a process that Irish participation in Imperial affairs helped accelerate. For instance, while the Empire had since the 1880s been occasionally referred to as the Commonwealth of Nations, the text of the Oath of Allegiance in the Anglo-Irish Treaty was the first use of the phrase in statute law; it replaced the British Empire in the course of negotiations.

The Balfour Declaration, issued at the 1926 Imperial Conference, formally recognized the equality of the Dominions with the United Kingdom and with one another, and established that the various governors-general would henceforth only take advice from their Dominion governments. This equality was codified in legislative terms by the Statute of Westminster in 1931, which removed almost all of Westminster's remaining authority to legislate for the Dominions, effectively granting the Free State internationally recognised independence. It also granted the Free State the freedom to amend its constitution outside the terms set by the Anglo-Irish Treaty. Patrick McGilligan, the Free State Minister for External Affairs, called the Statute of Westminster "the solemn declaration by the British people through their representatives in Parliament that the powers inherent in the Treaty position are what we have proclaimed them to be for the last ten years," and went on to present the legislation as largely the fruit of the Free State's efforts to secure for the other Dominions the same benefits it already enjoyed under the treaty.

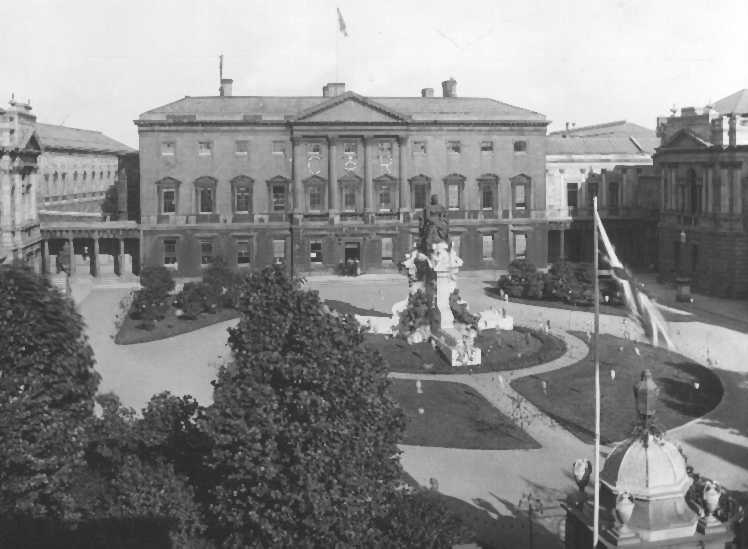
Leinster House, decorated for the visit of King George V and Queen Mary in 1911; within a decade, it became the seat of the Oireachtas (Irish Free State)

The 1932 Irish general election was won by Fianna Fáil, led by de Valera, on a republican platform. Over the next several years, the Irish government began reducing the visibility and formal role of the monarch and governor-general. Domhnall Ua Buachalla, a republican and former Fianna Fáil TD, was appointed governor-general in late 1932; on his government's advice, he withdrew from all public and ceremonial roles, performing in a perfunctory manner the minimum duties required by the Constitution. The governor-general's role in budget appropriations and ability to veto legislation were abolished, as was the Oath of Allegiance. No treaties requiring the assent of the king as head of state were signed from 1931 to 1937. Two methods were used to circumvent this: bilateral treaties were concluded at government rather than head-of-state level; for multilateral treaties, the Free State chose not to enrol at inauguration via the king's signature, but instead to accede a few months later via the signature of the Minister for External Affairs.

== 1936: Abdication crisis and the External Relations Act ==
In January 1936, George V died and was succeeded by his eldest son, who became Edward VIII. The new King's reign lasted only eleven months, and he abdicated in December of that year and was succeeded by George VI. The parliaments of independent members of the British Commonwealth were required to ratify this change in monarch, and de Valera's government decided to use this opportunity to drastically change the constitution.

The Constitution (Amendment No. 27) Act 1936, swiftly passed by the Oireachtas in response to the abdication, abolished the post of Governor-General and transferred most of the monarch's functions to other organs of government. Thus, for example, the executive power was transferred directly to the Executive Council, the right to appoint the President of the Executive Council was explicitly vested in Dáil Éireann (the lower house of parliament), and the power to promulgate legislation was transferred to the Ceann Comhairle (chairperson of the Dáil). However, the constitutional amendment also provided, without mentioning the monarch specifically, for the state to be represented by him in external affairs with other countries and their representatives:

it shall be lawful for the Executive Council, to the extent and subject to any conditions which may be determined by law to avail, for the purposes of the appointment of diplomatic and consular agents and the conclusion of international agreements of any organ used as a constitutional organ for the like purposes by any of the nations referred to in Article 1 of this Constitution.

The nations referred to in Article 1 were the other members of the British Commonwealth (Australia, Canada, New Zealand, South Africa, and the United Kingdom). The External Relations Act, adopted shortly after the constitutional amendment, gave life to this provision by providing that:

so long as [the Irish Free State] is associated with the following nations, that is to say, Australia, Canada, Great Britain, New Zealand, and South Africa, and so long as the king recognised by those nations as the symbol of their co-operation continues to act on behalf of each of those nations (on the advice of the several Governments thereof) for the purposes of the appointment of diplomatic and consular representatives and the conclusion of international agreements, the king so recognised may … act on behalf of [the Irish Free State] for the like purposes as and when advised by the Executive Council so to do.

Thus, for the remaining year of the Irish Free State's existence, the king's role was restricted to diplomatic and foreign affairs – a standard head of state role – but he performed no formal duties in regards to domestic legislation or governance. The Act also recognized Edward's abdication and the accession of his brother as George VI.

== 1937: Constitution of Ireland ==
In 1937 a new Constitution was adopted on the proposal of Éamon de Valera, establishing the contemporary Irish state named Éire or, in the English language, Ireland. It did not describe or declare the state to be a republic, or use descriptions such as Ireland or the Irish Republic.

The new constitution filled the gap left by the abolition of the Governor-General by creating the post of a directly elected president of Ireland, who would "take precedence over all other persons in the State", but was not explicitly described as head of state. The president was henceforth responsible for the ceremonial functions of dissolving the legislature, appointing the government, and promulgating the law. Unlike most heads of state in parliamentary systems, the president was not even the nominal chief executive. Instead, the role of exercising executive authority was explicitly granted to the government—in practice, to the Taoiseach, a role similar to the Free State constitution's President of the Executive Council. The constitution also, like the 1922 constitution that preceded it, contained many provisions typical of those found in republican constitutions, stating, for example, that sovereignty resided in the people and prohibiting the granting of titles of nobility.

Article 29 of the new constitution mirrored the amendment to its predecessor passed the previous year, by permitting the state to allow its external relations to be exercised by the king. Article 29.4.2° provided that:

For the purpose of the exercise of any executive function of the State in or in connection with its external relations, the Government may to such extent and subject to such conditions, if any, as may be determined by law, avail of or adopt any organ, instrument, or method of procedure used or adopted for the like purpose by the members of any group or league of nations with which the State is or becomes associated for the purpose of international co-operation in matters of common concern.

This provision meant that the External Relations Act continued to have the force of law until the legislature decided otherwise, and so the monarch continued to represent the state abroad when empowered to do so.

== Ambiguity from 1936 to 1949 ==
After the passage of the External Relations Act, some commentators consider that it was unclear whether the Irish state had become a republic or remained a form of constitutional monarchy and (from 1937) whether its head of state was the President of Ireland or King George VI. Executive power continued to be exercised de facto by the head of government. Nevertheless, the exact constitutional status of the state during this period has been a matter of scholarly and political dispute.

From 1936 until 1949, the role of the king in the Irish state, having been reduced to a few formal duties in foreign affairs, was invisible to most Irish people. The monarch never visited the state during that period and, due to the abolition of the office of Governor-General, had no official representative there. The Irish government had also ceased to actively participate in the institutions of the British Commonwealth after the 1932 Imperial Conference. The president, on the other hand, played a key role in important public ceremonies.

Asked to explain the country's status in 1945, de Valera insisted that it was a republic. He told the Dáil that:

The State ... is ... demonstrably a republic. Let us look up any standard text on political theory ... and judge whether our State does not possess every characteristic mark by which a republic can be distinguished or recognised. We are a democracy with the ultimate sovereign power resting with the people—a representative democracy with the various organs of State functioning under a written Constitution, with the executive authority controlled by Parliament, with an independent judiciary functioning under the Constitution and the law, and with a Head of State directly elected by the people for a definite term of office.

Referring to the External Relations Act he insisted that:

We are an independent republic, associated as a matter of our external policy with the States of the British Commonwealth.

Despite de Valera's views, many political scholars consider representing a nation abroad to be the key defining role of a head of state.

The issue seems to have come to a head in 1948 on an official visit to Canada by new Taoiseach John A. Costello, whose Fine Gael party carried the tradition of the pro-Treaty political forces in Ireland. During a state dinner with the Governor General of Canada, the Earl Alexander of Tunis, an agreement that there would be separate toasts for the King and for the President of Ireland was broken. Only a toast to the King was proposed, to the fury of the Irish delegation. Alexander, who was of Northern Irish descent, placed loyalist symbols, notably a replica of the famous Roaring Meg cannon used in the Siege of Derry, before an affronted Costello at the dinner. Shortly afterwards, while still in Ottawa, Costello announced that his government would introduce a bill that would unambiguously make Ireland a republic. Costello biographer David McCullagh has suggested that it was a spur of the moment reaction to offence caused by Alexander at the dinner, although the cabinet members at the time claimed that the decision had already been made and was announced early because it had been leaked to the Sunday Independent. The evidence of what really happened remains ambiguous.

== The Republic of Ireland Act 1948 ==
At any rate, the Republic of Ireland Bill was soon introduced into the Oireachtas. In the debate in the Seanad Éireann in December 1948 on the law, Costello argued that the bill would make the President of Ireland the Irish head of state. De Valera's party, the main opposition in the Dáil at the time, did not oppose the bill, and it passed quickly.

The Act contained three major provisions: it repealed the External Relations Act; it provided that the description of the state was the Republic of Ireland; and it provided that the external relations of the state would henceforth be exercised by the President.

The Act came into force on 18 April 1949, Easter Monday, to commemorate the Proclamation of the Irish Republic, which had been read by Patrick Pearse at the beginning of the Easter Rising on Easter Monday 1916. Soon after President Seán T. O'Kelly signed the act into law, he commemorated his new status as the clear and unambiguous Irish head of state with state visits to the Holy See and France. A visit to meet George VI at Buckingham Palace was also provisionally planned, but timetabling problems with the president's schedule prevented the meeting.

One practical implication of explicitly declaring the state to be a republic in 1949 was that it automatically led to the state's termination of membership of the then British Commonwealth, in accordance with the rules in operation at the time. However, on 26 April, just days after the Act came into effect, the Commonwealth issued the London Declaration, which allowed India to remain within the Commonwealth while becoming a republic. The formula used in the Declaration—that India would "accept ... The King as the symbol of the free association of its independent member nations and as such the Head of the Commonwealth"—has been noted for its similarity to de Valera's 1921 proposal for an Irish Republic's "external association" with the Commonwealth, and to the wording of the 1936 External Relations Act.

The United Kingdom responded to the Republic of Ireland Act by enacting the Ireland Act 1949. This Act formally asserted that the Irish state had, when the Republic of Ireland Act came into force, ceased "to be part of His Majesty's dominions" and accordingly was no longer within the Commonwealth. Nonetheless, the United Kingdom statute provided that Irish citizens would not be treated as aliens under British nationality law. This, in effect, granted them a status similar to the citizens of Commonwealth countries.

== List of monarchs ==
Portrait	Regnal name (birth–death)	House	Reign	
Portrait	Regnal name (birth–death)	House	Start	End
	George V (1865–1936)	Windsor	6 December 1922	20 January 1936
	George V (1865–1936)	Windsor	Governor-general: Timothy Healy; James McNeill; Domhnall Ua Buachalla; President of the Executive Council: W. T. Cosgrave; Éamon de Valera	
	Edward VIII (1894–1972)	Windsor	20 January 1936	12 December 1936 (Note: The Government of the Irish Free State recognised Edward VIII's abdication on 12 December 1936 in the External Relations Act, leading to a 24-hour period wherein Edward was king in the Irish Free State, while his brother was king of the UK and other Dominions.)
	Edward VIII (1894–1972)	Windsor	Governor-general: Domhnall Ua Buachalla; President of the Executive Council: Éamon de Valera	
	George VI (1895–1952)	Windsor	12 December 1936	29 December 1937
	George VI (1895–1952)	Windsor	Governor-general: Office abolished President of the Executive Council: Éamon de Valera	
	George VI (1895–1952)	Windsor	29 December 1937	18 April 1949
	George VI (1895–1952)	Windsor	President: Douglas Hyde; Seán T. O'Kelly; Taoiseach: Éamon de Valera; John A. Costello	

== Title of the sovereign ==
While Henry VIII of England had adopted "King of Ireland" as a distinct title in 1544, that title was subsumed into a single royal title with the formal unification of Ireland and Great Britain in 1801, and no distinct royal title or style was revived for use in Ireland between 1922 and 1949. Instead, a single style was used throughout the British Commonwealth:

- 1922–1927: By the Grace of God, of the United Kingdom of Great Britain and Ireland and of the British Dominions beyond the Seas King, Defender of the Faith, Emperor of India
- 1927–1948: By the Grace of God, of Great Britain, Ireland and the British Dominions beyond the Seas King, Defender of the Faith, Emperor of India
- 1948–1949: By the Grace of God, of Great Britain, Ireland and the British Dominions beyond the Seas King, Defender of the Faith

The changes during this period were effected by acts of the Parliament of the United Kingdom, which authorized the monarchs to make alterations to their style via royal proclamation. However, the wording of the 1927 change, brought about by the Royal and Parliamentary Titles Act 1927, was agreed upon at the 1926 Imperial Conference, in which representatives of the Irish Free State participated, and was formulated specifically to reflect the changed Irish political situation.

Irish law did not provide any alternate royal style or title during this period. The original text of the Constitution of the Irish Free State simply referred to the monarch as the "King" without further elaboration. The opening words of Ireland's superseding constitution of 1937 were "In the Name of the Most Holy Trinity, from Whom is all authority and to Whom, as our final end, all actions both of men and States must be referred", and there was no mention in it of the king or monarch; the External Relations Act, the only Irish law referring to the monarch still in force after 1936, called him "the king recognised by those nations [of the British Commonwealth] as the symbol of their co-operation."

Despite the passage of the Republic of Ireland Act, "Great Britain, Ireland" was not officially omitted from the royal title until 1953. Then, each Commonwealth realm adopted a unique title for the monarch. No mention of Ireland was made in any except in the title within the United Kingdom and its dependent territories: it was changed from "of Great Britain, Ireland and the British Dominions beyond the Seas Queen" to "of the United Kingdom of Great Britain and Northern Ireland and of Her other Realms and Territories Queen".

== See also ==
- Monarchy in Ireland
- Politics of the Republic of Ireland
- History of the Republic of Ireland
- "His Majesty's Government in the Irish Free State"
