= Royal assent (Ireland) =

Legal procedure in the Irish Free State

The granting, reserving or withholding of royal assent (Irish: Aontú an Rí) was one of the key roles, and potentially one of the key powers, possessed by the Governor-General of the Irish Free State. Until it was granted, no bill passed by the Oireachtas (composed of the Dáil and the Seanad) could complete its passage of enactment and become law.

== Origins of the power ==
The power was created in Article 41 of the Irish Free State Constitution (Saorstát Éireann) Act, 1922 enacted both by the 3rd Dáil meeting as a constituent assembly and by the Parliament of the United Kingdom and brought into force by a royal proclamation of 6 December 1922.

== Anglo-Irish Treaty ==
The role of the Governor-General in legislative enactment was initially defined in the Anglo-Irish Treaty signed in 1921 between plenipotentiaries of the UDI Irish Republic and the United Kingdom of Great Britain and Ireland and which was ratified by three bodies; the United Kingdom parliament, the Second Dáil and the House of Commons of Southern Ireland in December 1921 – January 1922.

== The reason for royal assent ==
All legislation enacted by the Oireachtas of Saorstát Éireann required royal assent to become law for three reasons.

1. Article 12 stated that the Oireachtas consisted "of the King and two Houses, the Chamber of Deputies (... "Dáil Éireann") and the Senate (... "Seanad Éireann")". As a result the King through his representative, the Governor-General, was a full participant in law making.
1. In the event of a dispute the signature of the Governor-General on the Act was evidence that it had been fully and validly enacted. This could prove important were in the future a dispute to arise over whether a particular Act had properly been enacted. An example would be where the Dáil was dissolved the same day as the bill completed its passage. If it had not already received royal assent prior to the dissolution the bill would fall (i.e., die). The existence of the Governor-General's signature would act as proof that the bill had received its royal assent before the dissolution, even if only by one minute.
1. All Acts of the Oireachtas in the Free State were translated into the two state languages, Irish and English. Whichever the Governor-General signed into law would receive primacy in the event of a clash in the texts. (Article 42)

== Granting, reserving or withholding royal assent ==
As with the King and other governors-general in the other Dominions, the Governor-General of the Irish Free State had three options:

1. The granting of royal assent, meaning that a bill became an act;
1. The reserve of royal assent "for His Majesty's Pleasure" meaning that the bill was put into abeyance pending approval of the bill by the King-in-Council within one year of the bill having been presented to the Governor-General. If approval was not given within one year the bill was deemed vetoed;
1. The withholding of royal assent, which meant that the bill was being vetoed.

Between 1922 and 1928 the Governor-General acted as the agent of both the King and the British Government. As a result, he could act on the advice of either, or on his own initiative withholding or refusing Assent.

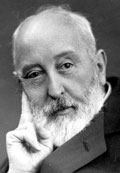
Governor-General Timothy Michael Healy (1922–28) He was instructed by the British Secretary of State for the Dominions to reserve or withhold consent for certain categories of Bills if attempts were made to enact them. No attempt was made.

Unknown to the Executive Council (His Majesty's Government in the Irish Free State) the first Governor-General, Timothy Michael Healy, was given instructions to exercise the withholding and refusal powers by the United Kingdom Secretary of State for the Dominions, in a number of specific areas:

- The passage of a bill that conflicted with the Anglo-Irish Treaty;
- The passage of a constitutional amendment to abolish the Oath of Allegiance to the Irish Free State (which included as subsidiary promise of fidelity to the King).

Neither of these scenarios occurred during the term of office of Governor-General Healy. By the time his successor, James McNeill, took office in 1928, the Balfour Declaration had changed Commonwealth policy such that the Governors-General of the Irish Free State and the other Dominions would receive advice only from their own Governments, and not from the Imperial Government in London. Though theoretically he could have done so, the third Governor-General, Domhnall Ua Buachalla, chose not to veto the 1933 Act that abolished the Oath of Allegiance.

== Method of royal assent ==
A bill, having duly passed or having been deemed to pass, in the Dáil and the Seanad, would be presented to the Governor-General (in the Viceregal Lodge until 1932, in his rented residence from 1932 to 1936), by the President of the Executive Council of the Irish Free State. Unlike in the United Kingdom, no parliamentary ceremony was invoked to confirm that royal assent had been given. Its details would instead be published in Iris Oifigiúil (the Irish state gazette).

== Domhnall Ua Buachalla ==
In 1933 the Counsellors of State, Queen Mary, Prince Edward, Prince of Wales and Prince Albert, Duke of York (acting for King George V who was ill), on the advice of the President of the Executive Council, Éamon de Valera, formally appointed an Anti-Treaty ex-Fianna Fáil TD, Domhnall Ua Buachalla (Donal Buckley) to become Governor-General of the Irish Free State. Though advised by de Valera's Executive Council not to carry out public engagements, Ua Buachalla continued to carry out his official state functions, including the granting of the royal assent.

== Abolition of withhold and reserve powers ==
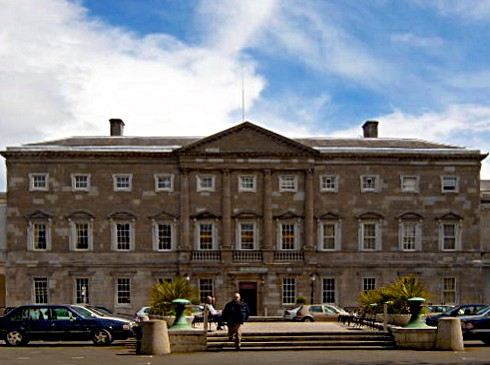
Leinster House Seat of Oireachtas Éireann. In 1933 the Oireachtas abolished the Governor-General's right to reserve or withhold royal assent.

In late 1933, the Oireachtas passed the Constitution (Amendment No. 21) Act 1933 to abolish the power of the Governor-General to reserve or withhold royal assent from bills.

The original Article 41 is shown below, with the section deleted indicated.

So soon as any Bill shall have been passed or deemed to have been passed by both Houses, the Executive Council shall present the same to the Representative of the Crown for the signification by him, in the King's name, of the King's assent, ~~and such Representative may withhold the King's assent or reserve the Bill for the signification of the King's pleasure: Provided that the Representative of the Crown shall in the withholding of such assent to or the reservation of any Bill, act in accordance with the law, practice, and constitutional usage governing the like withholding of assent or reservation in the Dominion of Canada.~~

~~A Bill reserved for the signification of the King's Pleasure shall not have any force unless and until within one year from the day on which it was presented to the Representative of the Crown for the King's Assent, the Representative of the Crown signifies by speech or message to each of the Houses of the Oireachtas, or by proclamation, that it has received the Assent of the King in Council.~~

~~An entry of every such speech, message or proclamation shall be made in the Journal of each House and a duplicate thereof duly attested shall be delivered to the proper officer to be kept among the Records of the Irish Free State (Saorstát Éireann).~~

The effect of the change was both to dramatically limit the Governor-General's powers and to prevent any role for the King-in-Council in lawmaking in the Irish Free State. The right of appeal to the Judicial Committee of the Privy Council was also abolished in 1933 in the Constitution (Amendment No. 22) Act 1933, while the Constitution (Amendment No. 20) Act 1933 abolished the Governor-General's role in formally recommending the appropriation of funds to the Dáil by message. That role was instead given directly to the Executive Council.

The series of three constitutional amendments in 1933 severely curtailed the role of the Governor-General of the Irish Free State.

== Abolition of royal assent ==
The procedure of royal assent was abolished by the Constitution (Amendment No. 27) Act 1936, which Act was itself the last to receive royal assent. The new Act amended the Constitution so that the Ceann Comhairle (speaker of Dáil Éireann) would sign bills into law once passed by the House. All references to the office of Governor-General were eliminated entirely from the Constitution by the Act. Under the new 1937 Constitution of Ireland (Bunreacht na hÉireann), which came into force almost exactly one year later, the role of signing bills into law was given to the President of Ireland.
