= Great Seal of the Irish Free State =

Official seal of the Irish Free State

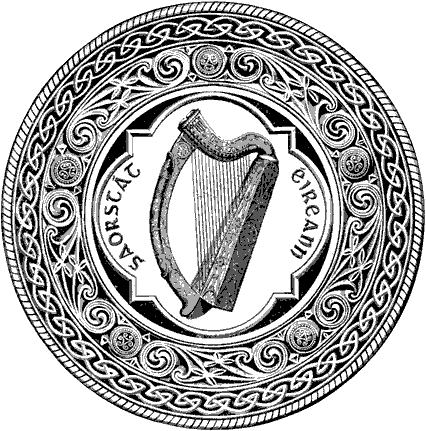
Design of the face of the 1925 "internal" Great Seal

The Great Seal of the Irish Free State (Irish: Séala Mór do Shaorstát Éireann) is either of two seals affixed to certain classes of official documents of the Irish Free State (Saorstát Éireann):

- the "internal" Great Seal, used from 1925 for "internal" documents (of domestic law) signed by the Governor-General
- the "external" Great Seal, used from 1932 for diplomatic documents signed by the British king.

A new seal, for documents signed by the President of Ireland, replaced the internal seal in 1937, when the Constitution of Ireland came into force; it replaced the external seal in 1949 when the Republic of Ireland Act came into force.

== Internal Great Seal ==
The Great Seal of Ireland was used in the English king's Lordship of Ireland, which in 1534 became the Kingdom of Ireland. The seal was retained by the Acts of Union 1800 for use by the Lord Lieutenant of Ireland in the business of the Dublin Castle administration. The Government of Ireland Act 1920 retained the Lord Lieutenant and Great Seal for use by both Northern Ireland and Southern Ireland. The 1921 Anglo-Irish Treaty envisaged an Irish Free State to replace Southern Ireland, with a Provisional Government and Provisional Parliament until the Free State's constitution was enacted. The draft constitution replaced the Lord Lieutenant with a Governor General but made no explicit mention of the seal.

In August 1922 the Provisional Government's civil servants sought ministerial approval to adopt a seal. It was thought necessary for legal reasons: the treaty and draft constitution specified that the Irish Free State would have the same constitutional status as Canada, which had its own Great Seal since its Confederation in 1867. The letters patent (Note: These letters patent were themselves issued under the UK Great Seal of the Realm. The commissions appointing T. M. Healy and his successors as Governor-General were each issued under the "Royal Sign Manual and signet".) issued on 6 December 1922 constituting the office of Governor-General said:

There shall be a Great Seal of and for the said State which We do hereby authorise and empower Our said Governor-General to keep and use for sealing all things whatsoever that shall pass the said Great Seal. Provided that, until a Great Seal shall be provided, the private seal of the Governor-General may be used as the Great Seal of the said State.

The wording matched the 1900 letters patent for the Great Seal of the Commonwealth of Australia. The Irish Free State (Consequential Provisions) Act 1922 also created a separate Governor and Great Seal for Northern Ireland. Before the 1925 delivery of the Great Seal, Healy his private seal as permitted by the 1922 letters patent; for example, after the 1923 Dáil election, the proclamation summoning the Free State Oireachtas was "Given under my Hand and (a Great Seal of the Irish Free State not having been yet provided) under my Private Seal at Dublin this 9th day of August, 1923."

The physical Great Seal was in theory in the custody of the Governor-General for his personal use; in practice the President of the Executive Council used it, and it was kept in his department even when authenticating the Governor-General's signature.

=== Design ===
The Great Seal features an image of a Celtic harp surrounded by Celtic knotwork and the words "SAORSTÁT ÉIREANN" in Gaelic script. The die comprises an inscribed copper matrix to be placed over the document to be sealed, and a counterpart relief steel patrix to be placed under it. Whereas the British and former Irish great seals had two-sided moulds to create a solid seal to be attached to the document via a cord, the Free State seal was a single-sided stamp placed directly onto the leaf of the document.

Regarding the design of the Great Seal, an approach was made by Hugh Kennedy, the Attorney General, to Thomas Sadleir, Registrar of the Office of Arms at Dublin Castle. In his reply Sadlier noted that he was "satisfied that the harp was very early in the 12th century an Irish badge...". The 1919–1922 seal of the revolutionary Dáil of the self-proclaimed Irish Republic showed a harp surrounded by the words "Sigullum Reipublicae Hibernicae — Seala Saorstáit Éireann". By contrast, the 1922 Provisional Government's seal was a quartering of the arms of the four provinces. The Provisional Government's private secretary suggested to Hugh Kennedy a similar seal for the Free State: "If considered desirable to symbolise in the design the present partition of Ulster, this could be done by leaving the Arms incomplete and broken at the corner.". George Sigerson, the President of the National Literary Society, recommended to Tim Healy, the new Governor-General, that the harp should be adopted as the symbol of the Free State. His view was that:

The harp was the common and sacred symbol of the Protestant Volunteer of 1782, of the Presbyterian and Catholic United Irishmen of 1798, of old and young Ireland and of men of after days – it is in no sense a party or sectional symbol but one which represents the entire Nation... It is now within the power of an Irish Independent Government to place this emblem of humanising harmony in its high place of honour, unique and not undistinguished amongst the lions, the leopards, and the single and double headed Eagles of the rest of the world.

Crest similar to that on the rejected 1922 design

On 28 December 1922 a meeting of the Executive Council of the Irish Free State decided that the Celtic harp should be adopted. Mabel McConnell, from a family of heraldic artists, was contracted by the Executive Council to make the sketches which the Royal Mint in England would use to cast the die matrix for the seal. The first design submitted placed an animal-head harp in a heraldic shield with crest, but the mint said this would be "a disaster". On 28 August 1923 the Executive Council determined that the "Brian Ború" harp in Trinity College Dublin, would be the basis of the new seal. Archibald McGoogan of the Art Department of the National Museum of Ireland perfected the design, and the Royal Mint in January 1924 said it was "delighted" with the revised version.

Final authorisation was given by the Executive Council on 17 October 1924 for the provision of the various seals, including ministerial seals which had the Brian Ború harp circumscribed with "Saorstát Éireann" and the ministerial title in Irish and English. The knotwork was a direct copy of the base of the Ardagh Chalice. McGoogan's original drawing was sold at auction in 2007 for €17,000. Cecil Thomas engraved the seal manually with hammer and chisel because it was "artistically dull" and "relied on sharp definition for its interest". Completed in 1925, it was 5.25 inches (133 mm) in diameter.

=== British legal objections ===
A. S. Roberts, Director of Stamping at the Revenue Commissioners, had fulfilled the same role in the Dublin Castle administration prior to the Free State's independence, and as such was used to dealing directly with the Royal Mint for ordering new revenue stamps. Using Roberts as the conduit for ordering the 1925 Great Seal meant the commission was fulfilled as an ordinary commercial contract. In 1926, the Colonial Office discovered the existence of the Free State's new seal and complained to Robert Johnson, Deputy Master and Controller of the Royal Mint, that proper procedures had not been followed: the design ought to have been submitted for pre-approval by the King-in-Council: that is, submitted via the Colonial Office to the Privy Council of the United Kingdom, which would advise the King to issue an Order in Council for formal approval.

== External Great Seal ==
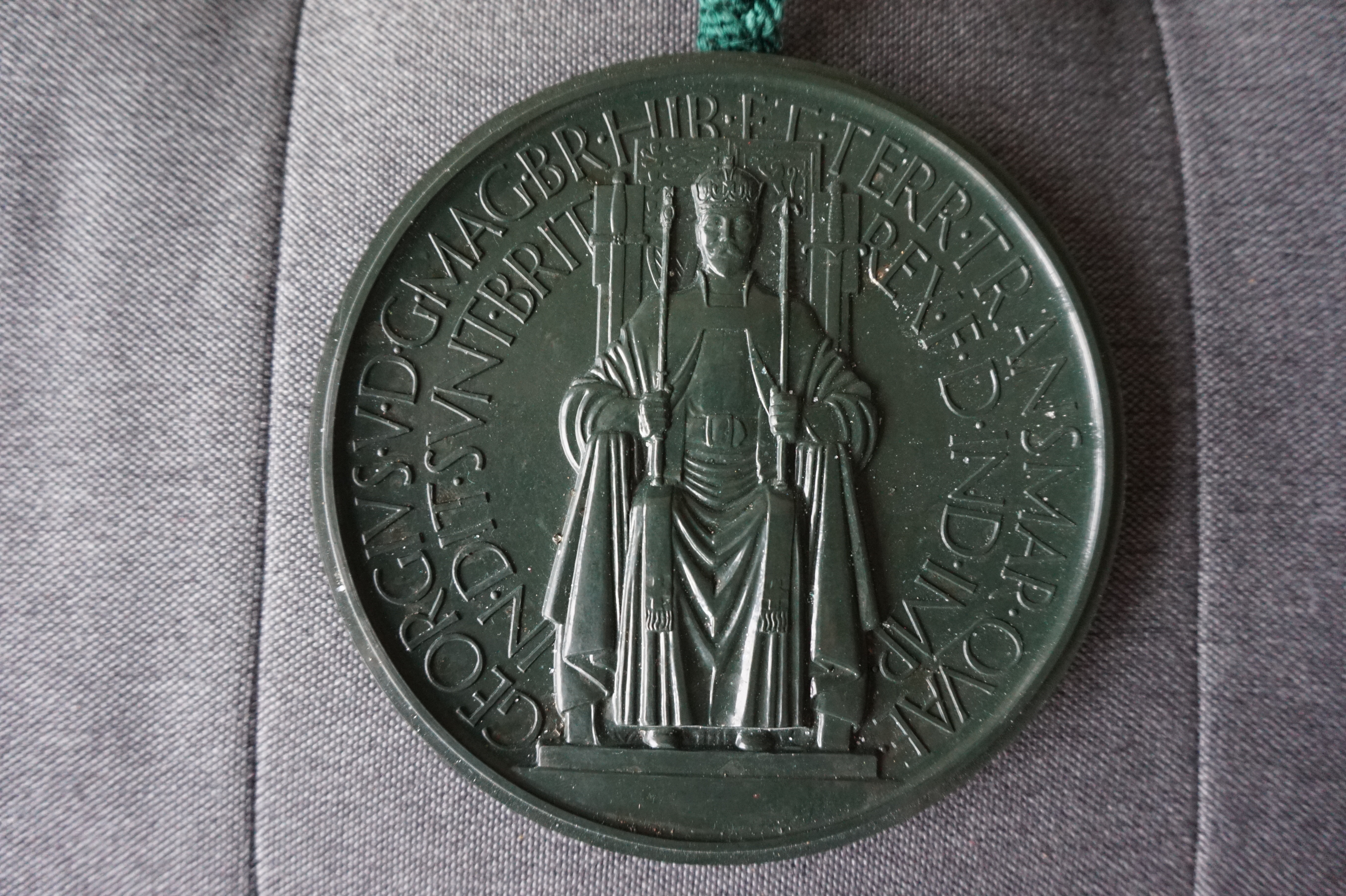
The obverse of the 1931 Free State external seal is the same as this 1930 UK great seal, except for the royal arms behind George V.

External image
- Counterseal of the 1931 signet seal [fig. C(1)] — the same design, in reduced size, as the Counterseal (reverse) of the External Great Seal.

In 1931, a separate External Great Seal or Royal Great Seal (Note: The form "External Great Seal" was used in internal government documents when needed to distinguish it from the pre-existing "internal" Great Seal. The form "Royal Great Seal" was used in South Africa's 1934 statute creating a similar seal, and adopted by foreign scholars to describe the equivalent seal in any Commonwealth Dominion including the Irish Free State.) was created to be used on diplomatic documents which required the signature of the monarch in London rather than the Governor-General in Dublin. Up to 1931, such documents had been transmitted to the Dominions Office and the British Great Seal of the Realm was applied alongside the signature. At the 1930 Imperial Conference, the Free State proposed that a Dominion should be allowed to send documents via its High Commissioner in London, bypassing the British government, and to affix its own seal rather than the British one. The conference subcommittee on seals resolved, "The subject should be postponed on the understanding that the whole question should be left for further discussion between Governments should occasion arise". In January 1931 the Free State government tested its proposed procedure; it applied the 1925 Free State seal to the instrument of ratification for a 1929 treaty between the Free State and Portugal, and sent it to High Commissioner John W. Dulanty to transmit to King George V. Dulanty was refused an audience, the British objecting on the grounds that the change in procedure had not been agreed, and that the 1925 seal was not in fact a "great seal" within the terms of the 1922 letters patent, but merely a "private seal of the Governor-General", since it had never been formally approved by the monarch. A compromise was negotiated whereby the Free State would use a separate "external seal" in the custody of its Minister for External Affairs. Although Arthur Berriedale Keith claimed in 1934 that "this drastic change in Commonwealth relations was carried out without any discussion in the British Parliament or intimation by the British Government of the change", in fact Sir William Davison asked J. H. Thomas, the Secretary of State for Dominion Affairs, about it in April 1931; Thomas referred to the Balfour Declaration of 1926.

The external seal, designed by Percy Metcalfe, had on its reverse a similar image to the 1925 "internal" seal: an Irish harp superimposed upon a Celtic knotwork Greek cross, encircled by the words "SAORSTAT EIREANN" in Gaelic type and further knotwork. Its diameter was 6 inches (150 mm), the same as the British Great Seal of the Realm, and had on its obverse the same image of the monarch enthroned as that seal, also designed by Metcalfe, except for the quartered royal arms above the throne, where the English arms in first and fourth quarters were switched with the Irish arms in third quarter. The proposal agreed by George V and the ensuing Department of External Affairs press release both said the new seal would be struck within the Free State. However, the matrix die was made at Royal Mint Court in London, both sides cut from a single piece of silver by applying a reducing machine to Metcalfe's model.

George V formally presented the external seal to John W. Dulanty on 18 January 1932 at Sandringham House. Keith commented that this marked "the final establishment of the complete international sovereignty of the Free State and the elimination of any British control". The External Great Seal was used only on ratifications and Full Powers, and not always on the latter. Smaller seals, also made by the Royal Mint in 1931, were used on lesser documents:

- The "Signet Seal" was used on exequaturs receiving foreign diplomats, and on consular commissions appointing Irish diplomats and, in 1932, the Governor General Domhnall Ua Buachalla. This seal was used to authenticate the king's "royal sign-manual", which was necessary on documents authorising the Dublin authorities to use the Great Seal. The Signet Seal was a stainless-steel replica of the Great Seal of diameter 2.5 inches (64 mm)
- The "Fob Seal" was a single-sided seal with the same modified quartered royal arms as the Great Seal. It was modelled on the pre-existing UK fob seal and used for the same purposes, on the back of the envelope enclosing letters of credence or recall.

Whereas the UK's Crown Office Act 1877 permits a small wafer Great Seal to replace the cumbersome wax Great Seal, the Free State's wax seal had no wafer equivalent.

The first use of the External Great Seal was not until 1937, when George VI sealed Full Powers allowing Francis T. Cremins to sign the Montreux Convention Regarding the Abolition of the Capitulations in Egypt on behalf of the Free State. Successive governments minimised the use of monarch and the External Great Seal. The state typically conducted bilateral agreements at inter-government level rather than the nominally more prestigious head-of-state level, so that the Minister for External Affairs would apply his departmental seal to any documents. After signing some multilateral treaties that would have required the External Great Seal for ratification, the state chose instead to wait until the treaty had come into force and then become a party to it by accession rather than ratification, as the internal Great Seal would suffice for accession. (Note: One instance was the aforementioned 1937 Montreux Convention: despite using the king and External Great Seal for Full Powers in 1937, the state did not accede to it until after it had come into force in 1938.)

After the Statute of Westminster 1931, following the Free State's lead, the Union of South Africa in 1934 and Canada in 1939 passed laws permitting themselves to use their own Great Seals for diplomatic functions. South Africa, like the Free State, created a new seal for these purposes, whereas Canada simply extended the use of its existing domestic seal.

== Supersession ==
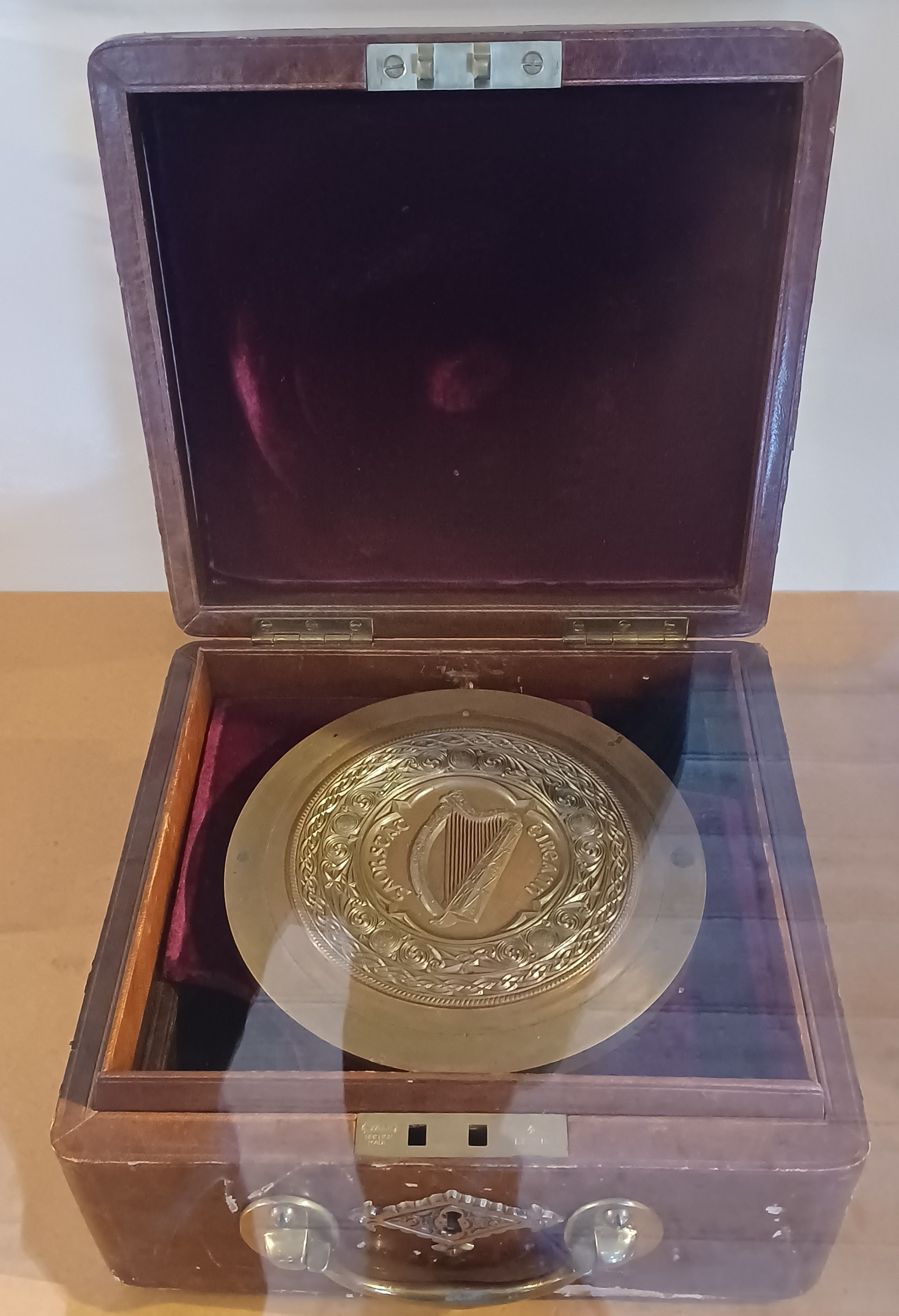
The matrix of the 1925 seal is now on display in the former Collins Barracks.

The fact that the Free State was a monarchy rather than a republic was politically controversial, and caused the 1922–1923 Irish Civil War. Although the republicans lost the war, Free State leaders sensitive to the controversy gradually abolished the Governor-General's formal powers, or transferred them elsewhere. The Ministers and Secretaries Act 1924 created a separate Executive Council seal, similar to the Great Seal but with Ard-Chomhairle (Irish for 'Executive Council') added to the inscription. When republican Civil War leader Éamon de Valera became President of the Executive Council after the 1932 Irish election, sidelining the Governor-General accelerated, until the Constitution (Amendment No. 27) Act 1936 abolished the office altogether and transferred its remaining functions to the Executive Council. Rather than using the internal Great Seal in connection with these functions, the Executive Council seal was used. In 1937 de Valera said "I have no idea of what sort of seal that [the internal Great Seal] was. As well as I remember, I never saw a document sealed with it." The die of the internal Free State seal is now on public display at National Museum of Ireland – Decorative Arts and History in Dublin.

Ancillary to the abolition of the Governor-Generalship, the Executive Authority (External Relations) Act 1936 continued the use of the External Great Seal by the King. The distinction between the two Great Seals was not always clearly understood. In 1932, Hugh Kennedy, by then Chief Justice, was under the impression that the internal and external seals were in the custody respectively of the Executive Council and Governor-General. The 1937 Constitution of Ireland created the office of President of Ireland, and the Seal of the President was created for the President's formal signature of official documents in the same manner as the internal Free State seal had been used, and having the same design except substituting "Éire" for "Saorstát Éireann", since the constitution had changed the name of the state. The text on the reverse of the External Great Seal was changed likewise, and the British monarch, George VI, continued to sign diplomatic documents using it. This dichotomy reflected ambiguity over who was head of state. The Republic of Ireland Act 1948 transferred diplomatic functions to the President, rendering the External Great Seal obsolete.

== See also ==
- Coat of arms of Ireland
