= Irish states since 1171 =

Irish states have existed under a number of different names for nearly a thousand years. A unified Irish proto-state had been coalescing from the multitude of small tribal kingdoms that existed circa AD 500, similar to the pattern elsewhere in Europe. The independent development of the several dynastic regional kingdoms into a nascent national kingdom, however, was extinguished by the Norman invasion of Ireland in 1169, although these regional Gaelic Ireland kingdoms continued to resist for centuries until the Tudor conquest of Ireland was completed in the 17th century.

This list deals with the various states that existed from 1171 onwards that owed their origin to Norman and later, English involvement on the island of Ireland. These were recognised by the Holy See before 1570 and after 1766. Until the whole island was subdued following the end of the Nine Years' War in 1603 these states shared the island of Ireland with a patchwork of indigenous states that existed outside of their authority.

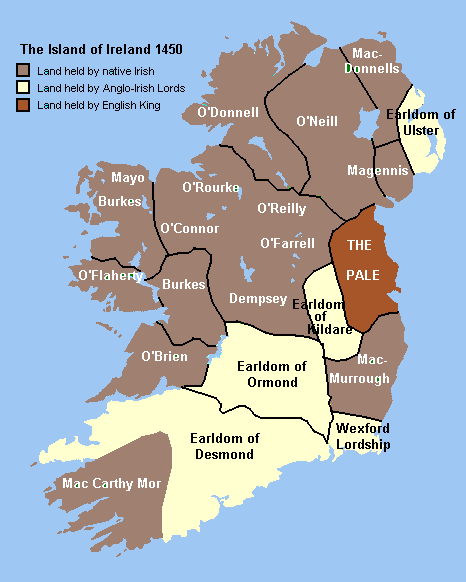
Ireland in 1450

The list below refers to all-Ireland (or nominally all-Ireland) states and to the 1922 post-partition states, not the individual Gaelic kingdoms which exercised the actual governance in their area when they existed, including during the 1350–1500 "Gaelic resurgence".

- Lordship of Ireland (1171–1541)
- Kingdom of Ireland (1541–1800)

- Confederate Ireland (1642–1649) was an Irish government that controlled about two thirds of Ireland during the Wars of the Three Kingdoms and is arguably the only large successful sustained period of Irish self-government between the time of Brian Boru the High King of Ireland and the foundation of the Irish Free State in 1922.
- Patriot Parliament (1689)
- The revolutionary French backed Irish Republic (late August and early September 1798) controlled only parts of Connacht and is often overlooked today

- Part of the United Kingdom of Great Britain and Ireland (1801–1922)

- The revolutionary Irish Republic (Easter Week, 1916) controlled only small parts of the capital, Dublin, for 6 days, but has had great symbolic significance ever since

- The revolutionary Irish Republic (1919–22)
- Northern Ireland (1921–present) and Southern Ireland (1921–1922), both created by the Government of Ireland Act 1920, though only the former existed in reality.
- Irish Free State (Saorstát Éireann) (1922–37)
- Ireland (1937–present), often known since 1949 by its official description, Republic of Ireland, and sometimes in English as Éire, the word for Ireland in Irish.

For international purposes the British monarch was also King of Ireland until 1949, after which time the President of Ireland became the sole sovereign. The Monarch's internal powers had already been removed by 1937. With the enactment of the Republic of Ireland Act in 1949, all powers of the British monarch were transferred to the president. The name of the state remained Ireland, even after the passing of the Republic of Ireland Act, see names of the Irish state.

== See also ==
- List of Irish uprisings – from 1534 to 1998
- History of Ireland (800–1169)

== Timeline of Irish states ==
–1607	1642–1653	1798	1916–1921	1922–1937	1937–
Gaelic Ireland	Confederate Ireland	Irish Republic (1798)^{2}	Irish Republic	Irish Free State	Ireland
Lordship of Ireland^{1}	Kingdom of Ireland	Commonwealth of England, Scotland and Ireland	Kingdom of Ireland	United Kingdom of Great Britain and Ireland	Southern Ireland^{3}
1922
Munster Republic^{2}
United Kingdom of Great Britain and Northern Ireland
Northern Ireland	1969–1972	Direct rule
Free Derry^{4}
1171–1541	1541–1649	1649–1660	1660–1801	1801–1921	1921–1973	1973–1998	1998–
Notes: / ^{1} Papal overlordship granted as feudal possession to English crown^{2} Extra-judicial area during time of war^{3} Parliament never met; although its members met as an extra-parliamentary body to ratify Anglo-Irish Treaty^{4} Extra-judicial area during time of civil unrest; End of Gaelic period Start of British constitutional period Start of Irish constitutional period / ^{1} Papal overlordship granted as feudal possession to English crown^{2} Extra-judicial area during time of war^{3} Parliament never met; although its members met as an extra-parliamentary body to ratify Anglo-Irish Treaty^{4} Extra-judicial area during time of civil unrest
