= Adoption of the Constitution of Ireland =

Plebiscite approving the Constitution of Ireland

Plebiscite on the Constitution of Ireland
- 29 December 1937
- Do you approve of the Draft Constitution which is the subject of this plebiscite?

Results
Choice	Votes	%
Yes	685,105	56.52%
No	526,945	43.48%
Valid votes	1,212,050	90.03%
Invalid or blank votes	134,157	9.97%
Total votes	1,346,207	100.00%
Registered voters/turnout	1,775,055	75.84%
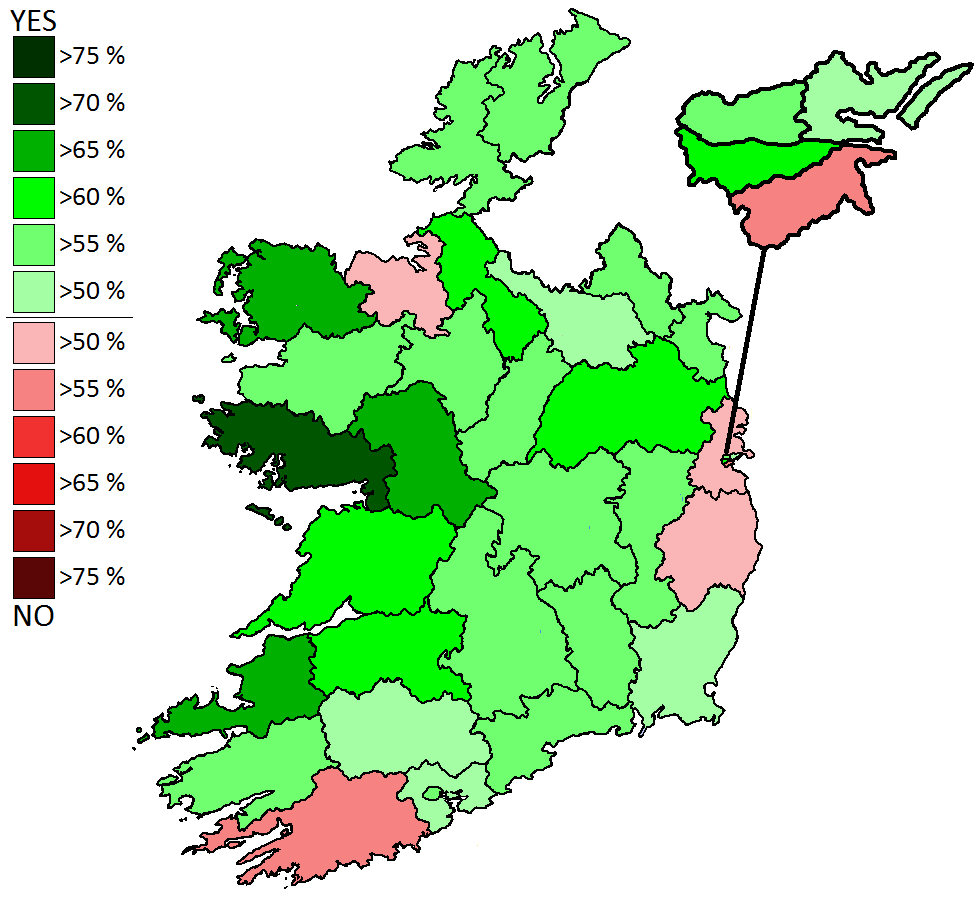
- Results by Dáil Constituency

The current Constitution of Ireland came into effect on 29 December 1937, repealing and replacing the Constitution of the Irish Free State, having been approved in a national plebiscite on 1 July 1937 with the support of 56.5% of voters in the then Irish Free State. The Constitution was closely associated with Éamon de Valera, the President of the Executive Council of the Irish Free State at the time of its approval (and who assumed the position of Taoiseach on its adoption).

== Background ==
The Constitution of Ireland replaced the Constitution of the Irish Free State, which had come into force on 6 December 1922, marking the establishment of a separate dominion within the British Commonwealth of Nations.

=== 1922 Constitution ===
The original text of the 1922 Constitution was a schedule to the Constitution of the Irish Free State (Saorstát Eireann) Act 1922, passed by the 3rd Dáil sitting as a Constituent Assembly on 25 October 1922. This Act has subsequently been regarded by Irish courts as sufficient in itself to bring the Constitution into effect. However, the view of the British government at the time was different, and the Parliament of the United Kingdom passed on 5 December 1922 its own act, the Irish Free State Constitution Act 1922, with the entire Irish Act as a schedule, to give effect to the Constitution in British law.

Under the 1922 Constitution amendments were governed by Article 50. Article 50, at the time the 1937 Constitution was adopted, provided that constitutional amendments could be enacted by the Oireachtas (parliament) under the same procedure used for the adoption of ordinary laws. De Valera's government repudiated the 1922 Constitution as an unrepublican, foreign imposition and so deliberately provided that the new constitution would be adopted by in a manner outside the terms of the 1922 Constitution.

=== Motivation for change ===
There were two main motivations for replacing the constitution in 1937. Firstly, the Irish Free State constitution of 1922 was, in the eyes of many, associated with the Anglo-Irish Treaty. The largest political group in the anti-treaty faction, who opposed the treaty initially by force of arms, had boycotted the institutions of the new Irish Free State until it reorganised as the Fianna Fáil party in 1926. In 1932 they were elected into power under the leadership of Éamon de Valera.

After 1932, some of the articles of the original Constitution which were required by the Anglo-Irish Treaty were dismantled by acts of the Oireachtas, as permitted in British law by the Statute of Westminster 1931. These amendments removed references to the Oath of Allegiance, appeals to the United Kingdom's Judicial Committee of the Privy Council, the British Crown and the Governor General. The sudden abdication of Edward VIII in December 1936 was quickly used to redefine the royal connection via the Executive Authority (External Relations) Act 1936. Nevertheless, the Fianna Fáil government, led by Éamon de Valera, still desired to replace the Constitution of the Irish Free State, due to a belief that it had been imposed upon Ireland by the government of the United Kingdom, and its association with the Anglo-Irish Treaty. The main opponents of the Treaty had been elected to power as Fianna Fáil under Éamon de Valera in 1932, and a commitment was made to replace the constitution of the Free State. So closely tied to the policies of Fianna Fáil was the proposed new constitution that the 1937 referendum has been described as a vote of confidence in the republican government. After a new constitution was drafted by John Hearne, supervised by de Valera, the draft was debated and approved by the Oireachtas. The Oireachtas passed the Plebiscite (Draft Constitution) Act 1937, which allowed for a plebiscite to be held on the new constitution.

The second motive for replacing the original constitution was primarily symbolic. De Valera wanted to put an Irish stamp on the institutions of government, and chose to do this in particular through the use of Irish-language nomenclature.

== Drafting process ==
De Valera as President of the Executive Council personally supervised the writing of the Constitution. It was drafted initially by John Hearne, legal adviser to the Department of External Affairs. De Valera served as his own External Affairs Minister, hence the use of the Department's Legal Advisor, with whom he had previously worked closely, as opposed to the Attorney General or someone from the Department of the President of the Executive Council. He also received significant input from John Charles McQuaid, the Catholic Archbishop of Dublin, on religious, educational, family and social welfare issues. The text was translated into Irish over a number of drafts by a group headed by Micheál Ó Gríobhtha (assisted by Risteárd Ó Foghludha), who worked in the Department of Education.

A draft of the constitution was presented personally to the Vatican for review and comment on two occasions by the Department Head at External Relations, Joseph P. Walsh. Prior to its tabling in Dáil Éireann and presentation to the Irish electorate in a plebiscite, Vatican Secretary of State Cardinal Eugenio Pacelli, the future Pope Pius XII, said about the final amended draft, "I do not approve, neither do I disapprove; We shall maintain silence." The quid pro quo for this indulgence of the Catholic Church's interests in Ireland was the degree of respectability which it conferred on De Valera's formerly denounced republican faction and its reputation as the 'semi-constitutional' political wing of the 'irregular' anti-treaty forces.

== Dáil debate ==
The draft constitution was approved by the Oireachtas before being put to a vote. The Free State Oireachtas was originally bicameral, consisting of the Dáil and the Seanad or Senate, as well as the Governor-General, who gave royal assent to bills to enact them. However, the Seanad and Governor-General had been abolished in 1936, so that once passed by the Dáil, a bill became law on the signature of the Ceann Comhairle.

The Constitution was not presented as a bill for enactment by the Oireachtas. Instead, the standing orders of the Dáil were changed so that it could pass a resolution by which it "approved" the draft constitution without it therefore immediately becoming law. The draft Constitution was introduced in Dáil on 10 March 1937, and was processed in the same manner as a bill, with first and second stages, committee and report stages, and a final stage on 14 June. Some amendments were made during these stages; notably, the name of the state was changed from Éire to "Éire, or in the English language, Ireland".

During the debate De Valera claimed that if the Northern situation did not exist “there would be a flat down declaration of a Republic in this Constitution."

== Amendments ==
The constitution contained reforms and symbols intended to assert Irish sovereignty. These included:

- a new name for the state, "Éire" (in Irish) and "Ireland" (in English);
- a claim that the national territory was the entire island of Ireland, thereby challenging Britain's partition settlement of 1921;
- the removal of references to the King of Ireland and the replacement of the monarch's representative, the governor-general, with a popularly elected President of Ireland, who takes "precedence over all other persons in the State and who shall exercise and perform the powers and functions conferred on the President by this Constitution and by law";
- recognition of the "special position" of the Catholic Church;
- a recognition of the Catholic concept of marriage which excluded civil divorce, even though civil marriage was retained;
- the declaration that the Irish language was the "national language" and the first official language of the nation although English was also included as "a" second official language;
- the use of Irish language terms to stress Irish cultural and historical identity (e.g., Uachtarán, Taoiseach, Tánaiste, etc.)

== Positions on Draft Constitution ==
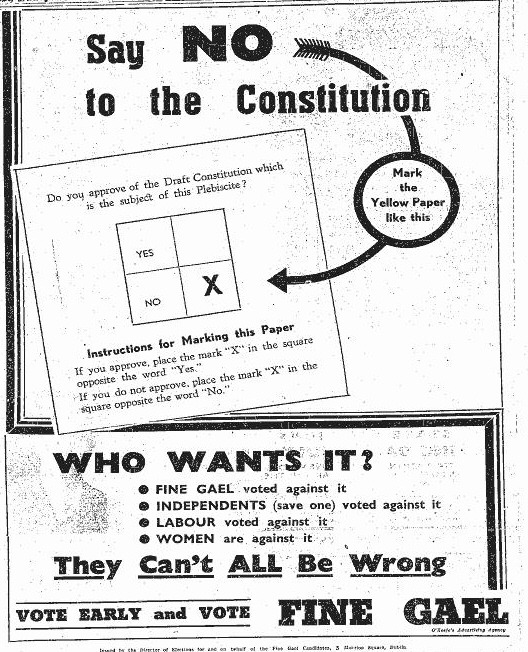
A Fine Gael poster from 1937 advocating that people should vote against the proposed new constitution.

Supporters of replacing the Irish Free State Constitution were largely sympathetic to the Fianna Fáil party, or republicans who believed in removing the remaining constitutional and legal links to the British state. Opponents of the new constitution included a coalition of supporters of Fine Gael and the Labour Party, and former unionists who were concerned about permanently losing the last vestiges of Britain's influence on the institutions of Irish government. The National University Women Graduates' Association opposed the new constitution on the basis that it could undermine women's rights and privacy in the home.

== Plebiscite ==
The framers of the 1937 Constitution decided that it would be enacted not by an elected body but by the people themselves by means of a plebiscite. The preamble to the 1937 Constitution is thus written in the name not of the legislature but of "We, the people of Éire". The Oireachtas on 2 June 1937 passed the Plebiscite (Draft Constitution) Act 1937, which mandated the holding of a plebiscite on the draft constitution on the same date as the next general election. The Dáil was dissolved as soon as it had approved the draft constitution on 14 June 1937. The ensuing general election was held on 1 July 1937, and the plebiscite was held in parallel.

It was the only statewide plebiscite or referendum to take place in the Irish Free State. (The term referendum is used in Irish law where the question is enactment of a bill; plebiscite is used for other questions.) The question put to voters was:

Do you approve of the Draft Constitution which is the subject of this plebiscite?

It was passed with 56.5% of those voting in favour, comprising 38.6% of the total electorate.

Choice	Votes	%
For	685,105	56.52
Against	526,945	43.48
Total	1,212,050	100.00
Valid votes	1,212,050	90.03
Invalid/blank votes	134,157	9.97
Total votes	1,346,207	100.00
Registered voters/turnout	1,775,055	75.84
Source: Beat Müller

The number of invalid or blank votes was high at almost 10% of the total votes cast. The 'Yes' vote won a majority in all but five of the thirty four constituencies, representing a solid level of support across Ireland. In a further six constituencies (Cavan, Cork North, Cork South-East, Leitrim, Roscommon, and Wexford), the majority for 'Yes' was less than the number of spoilt votes (spoilt votes also exceeded the 'No' majority in four of the five constituencies that voted 'No', the exception being Dublin Townships). Geographically, the 'No' vote was strongest in the constituencies of Dublin County and Wicklow, and in Cork West. The draft constitution had least support in Dublin Townships, and gained most support in Galway West, where three-quarters of voters backed the proposal. The plebiscite vote was heavily influenced by party political loyalties. Fianna Fáil voters overwhelmingly voted 'Yes', while Fine Gael voters and Protestants largely voted 'No'. The bulk of Labour voters supported the new constitution, despite the opposition of the party leadership.

Results by constituency
Constituency	Electorate	Turnout (%)	Votes		Proportion of votes	
Constituency	Electorate	Turnout (%)	Yes	No	Yes	No
Athlone–Longford	38,295	77.9%	15,648	11,367	57.9%	42.1%
Carlow–Kildare	48,536	75.8%	18,745	14,407	56.5%	43.5%
Cavan	47,008	80.5%	17,412	16,508	51.3%	48.7%
Clare	62,551	79.5%	29,279	16,454	64.0%	36.0%
Cork Borough	53,019	73.3%	20,765	15,392	57.4%	42.6%
Cork North	47,822	82.3%	17,458	16,350	51.6%	48.4%
Cork South-East	41,669	76.9%	13,764	12,733	51.9%	48.1%
Cork West	67,017	80.4%	19,741	24,668	44.5%	55.5%
Donegal East	48,975	75.4%	18,680	13,041	58.9%	41.1%
Donegal West	38,532	71.7%	14,160	11,086	56.1%	43.9%
Dublin County	83,457	70.5%	26,901	28,840	48.3%	51.7%
Dublin North-East	50,323	72.7%	18,651	16,496	53.1%	46.9%
Dublin North-West	69,174	68.9%	26,095	19,210	57.6%	42.4%
Dublin South	82,659	69.6%	32,669	21,504	60.3%	39.7%
Dublin Townships	52,664	71.6%	14,810	21,336	41.0%	59.0%
Galway East	49,476	70.0%	21,273	10,049	67.9%	32.1%
Galway West	42,796	61.1%	17,836	6,234	74.1%	25.9%
Kerry North	48,621	73.1%	21,292	10,857	66.2%	33.8%
Kerry South	35,390	74.4%	13,658	9,573	58.8%	41.2%
Kilkenny	40,900	82.1%	16,926	13,746	55.2%	44.8%
Leitrim	36,368	75.8%	12,583	8,429	59.9%	40.1%
Laois–Offaly	60,945	79.3%	25,654	17,717	59.2%	40.8%
Limerick	81,397	81.2%	35,187	21,954	61.6%	38.4%
Louth	38,570	78.6%	16,326	11,688	58.3%	41.7%
Mayo North	38,170	67.9%	15,900	8,247	65.8%	34.2%
Mayo South	59,999	70.3%	22,225	15,734	58.6%	41.4%
Meath–Westmeath	61,654	79.6%	27,586	18,704	59.6%	40.4%
Monaghan	36,469	86.4%	16,189	12,107	57.2%	42.8%
Roscommon	42,103	76.4%	15,481	12,910	54.5%	45.5%
Sligo	36,516	78.0%	10,780	11,916	47.5%	52.5%
Tipperary	82,727	81.8%	34,776	28,041	55.4%	44.6%
Waterford	51,596	79.8%	22,118	16,578	57.2%	42.8%
Wexford	61,486	78.7%	23,129	20,391	53.1%	46.9%
Wicklow	38,171	78.3%	11,408	12,678	47.4%	52.6%
Total	1,775,055	75.8%	685,105	526,945	56.5%	43.5%

== Legal basis of enactment & coming into effect ==
The enactment of the Constitution of Ireland in 1937 has been described as a "legal revolution". The Irish Free State government was bound by the 1922 Constitution of the Irish Free State. The 1922 Constitution was made subject to the Anglo-Irish Treaty. Dáil Éireann (there was no Seanad Éireann at the time) did not have the power under article 12 of the Treaty to enact a new constitution. That was for a new constituent assembly only. The government chose to ignore these restrictions. The draft constitution was published on 1 May 1937, and only approved by Dáil Éireann on 14 June 1937. On 2 June 1937, the Oireachtas had enacted the Plebiscite (Draft Constitution) Act 1937. That statute made provision for a plebiscite on the draft constitution "throughout Saorstát Éireann" defined in Irish law as excluding Northern Ireland. The plebiscite on 1 July 1937 (as opposed to its organization) was not constitutional, which is why enactment by the people was a legal revolution.

Article 48 of the new Constitution provided for the repeal of the Irish Free State constitution, from the date of coming into operation of the new constitution. Under article 62, this was either after an interval of 180 days, or sooner if the Dáil so decided. The Irish Free State government chose not to have the Dáil (operating under the 1922 Constitution) decide, and the new Constitution came into operation on 29 December 1937 (without legal challenge to its validity).

Consequential acts were passed between July and December 1937 to provide for the establishment of, and holding elections for, the new Seanad and the Presidency, as well as for other adaptations. The Presidential Establishment Act 1938 was passed after the Constitution had come into effect but before the first President, Douglas Hyde, took office. Upon the new Constitution taking effect, De Valera's Executive Council became a Government, and De Valera became Taoiseach with greatly expanded powers. Among other things, he had the right to advise the President to dismiss ministers individually, and could also seek a parliamentary dissolution on his own authority.

New official stamps, seals, and papers marked "Éire" replaced those with "Saorstát Éireann"; in some cases immediately, in other cases after existing stocks had run out.

== International response ==
When the new constitution was enacted, according to The New York Times, the British government "contented itself with a legalistic protest". Its protest took the form of a communiqué on 30 December 1937 in which the British stated:

His Majesty's Government in the United Kingdom has considered the position created by the new Constitution … of the Irish Free State, in future to be described under the Constitution as 'Eire' or 'Ireland' … [and] cannot recognize that the adoption of the name 'Eire' or 'Ireland', or any other provision of those articles [of the Irish constitution], involves any right to territory … forming part of the United Kingdom of Great Britain and Northern Ireland … They therefore regard the use of the name 'Eire' or 'Ireland' in this connection as relating only to that area which has hitherto been known as the Irish Free State.

The Eire (Confirmation of Agreements) Act 1938 provided that Eire would be the style in UK law for the Irish state.

The Irish Government received messages of goodwill from 268 United States congressmen including eight senators. The signatories expressed "their ardent congratulations on the birth of the State of Ireland and the consequent coming into effect of the new constitution", adding that "We regard the adoption of the new constitution and the emergence of the State of Ireland as events of the utmost importance."

Ireland was treated as a successor state to the Irish Free State in its international relations. The Department of External Affairs notified foreign governments only of the change of name and did not re-accredit diplomats.
