= Constitution (Amendment No. 20) Act 1933 =

The Constitution (Amendment No. 20) Act 1933 (act no. 40 of 1933, previously bill no. 47 of 1933) was an Act of the Oireachtas of the Irish Free State amending the Constitution of the Irish Free State which had been adopted in 1922.

It amended Article 37 by transferring the power to recommend the appropriation of money from the Governor-General to the Executive Council. It was part of a series of constitutional changes the Fianna Fáil government led by Éamon de Valera had initiated after coming to office in 1932 which diminished the role of the Governor-General, culminating in the removal of the position in the Constitution (Amendment No. 27) Act 1936.

Article 37 had provided that this function was carried out by the Governor General on the advice of the Executive. Thus the change was symbolic in nature.

The Act became obsolete on the repeal of the 1922 Constitution on the adoption of the Constitution of Ireland in 1937, and was repealed by the Statute Law Revision Act 2016.
