= Constitution (Amendment No. 21) Act 1933 =

Constitutional amendment of the Irish Free State

The Constitution (Amendment No. 21) Act 1933 (act no. 41 of 1933, previously bill no. 48 of 1933) was an Act of the Oireachtas of the Irish Free State amending the Constitution of the Irish Free State which had been adopted in 1922. It abolished the right of the Governor General to refuse to sign a Bill passed by the Oireachtas. It was part of a series of constitutional changes the Fianna Fáil government led by Éamon de Valera had initiated after coming to office in 1932 which diminished the role of the Governor-General, culminating in the removal of the position in the Constitution (Amendment No. 27) Act 1936.

It amended Article 41 by the deletion of the words struck out below:

So soon as any Bill shall have been passed or deemed to have been passed by both Houses, the Executive Council shall present the same to the Representative of the Crown for the signification by him, in the King's name, of the King's assent~~, and such Representative may withhold the King's assent or reserve the Bill for the signification of the King's pleasure: Provided that the Representative of the Crown shall in the withholding of such assent to or the reservation of any Bill, act in accordance with the law, practice, and constitutional usage governing the like withholding of assent or reservation in the Dominion of Canada.~~

~~A Bill reserved for the signification of the King's Pleasure shall not have any force unless and until within one year from the day on which it was presented to the Representative of the Crown for the King's Assent, the Representative of the Crown signifies by speech or message to each of the Houses of the Oireachtas, or by proclamation, that it has received the Assent of the King in Council.~~

~~An entry of every such speech, message or proclamation shall be made in the Journal of each House and a duplicate thereof duly attested shall be delivered to the proper officer to be kept among the Records of the Irish Free State (Saorstát Eireann)~~.

The Act became obsolete on the repeal of the 1922 Constitution on the adoption of the Constitution of Ireland in 1937, and was repealed by the Statute Law Revision Act 2016.
