= Domhnall Ua Buachalla =

Irish politician (1866–1963)

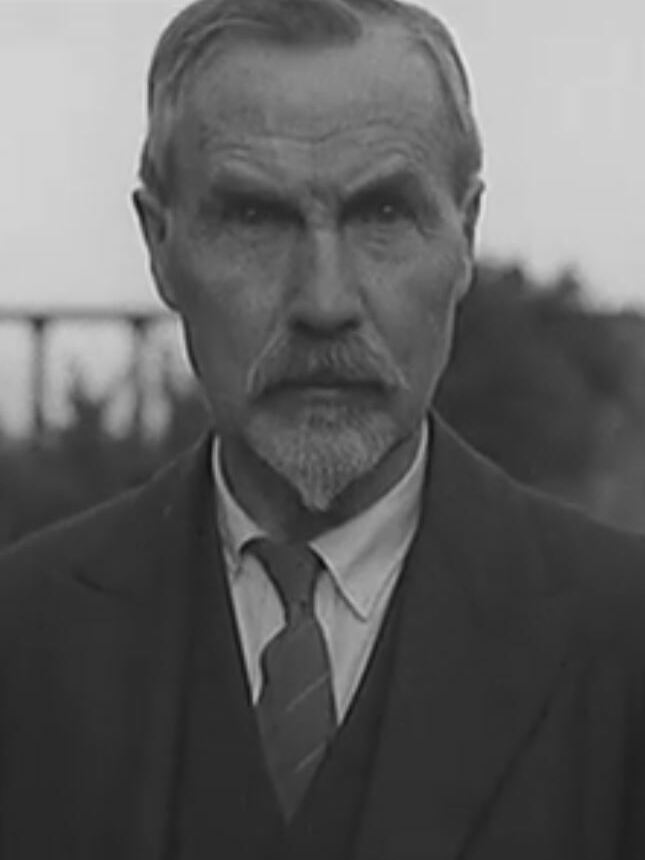
- Ua Buachalia, c. 1932

Governor-General of the Irish Free State
- In office 27 November 1932 – 11 December 1936
- Monarchs: George V; Edward VIII
- President: Éamon de Valera
- Preceded by: James McNeill
- Succeeded by: Office abolished

Teachta Dála
- In office June 1927 – February 1932
- Constituency: Kildare
- In office May 1921 – June 1922
- Constituency: Kildare–Wicklow
- In office December 1918 – May 1921
- Constituency: Kildare North

Personal details
- Born: 3 February 1866 Maynooth, County Kildare, Ireland
- Died: 30 October 1963 (aged 97) Dublin, Ireland
- Spouse: Sinéad Walsh (m. 1897; died 1918)
- Children: 7

Domhnall Ua Buachalla (Irish: [ˈd̪ˠoːnˠəl̪ˠ uə ˈbˠuəxəl̪ˠə]; English: Daniel Richard "Donal" Buckley; 3 February 1866 – 30 October 1963) was an Irish politician and member of the First Dáil who served as third and final governor-general of the Irish Free State from 1932 to 1936, and later served as a member of the Council of State from 1959 until his death.

== Early life ==
Ua Buachalla was born in Maynooth in County Kildare on 3 February 1866. His birth was registered as Daniel, the son of Cornelius Buckley, a shopkeeper, and Sarah Buckley, née Jacob. He married Sinéad Walsh in Dolphin's Barn, Dublin, on 3 June 1897. After his marriage, he and his family lived in Maynooth, where he ran a combined grocery, bicycle shop and pub in the town. He was an Irish language activist and member of Conradh na Gaeilge. In 1907, he was arrested and had his groceries seized when he refused to pay a fine for having his grocery wagon painted with Domhnall Ua Buachalla (his name in the Irish language), as British law required grocery wagons to be registered only in the English language.

== 1916–1932 ==
He was a member of the Irish Volunteers and on the outbreak of the 1916 Easter Rising, he cycled the 26 kilometres to Dublin, found the Rising was on and returned to Maynooth, where he gathered his men, marched them to Dublin and fought in the GPO and as a sniper in outposts in the Exchange Hotel in Parliament Street and Arnott's of Henry Street; he was a crack shot. On the retreat from the GPO he was sent on a sortie and made it to the William and Woods factory, but found it full of looters, and left. He made it to the Broadstone railway station but was held there by British soldiers and sent to Richmond Barracks and from there to Knutsford Prison and then Frongoch internment camp in Wales. He was released a few days before Christmas 1916, and describes the prisoners getting a "royal welcome" on their return. Like many Rising survivors, he joined Sinn Féin, a small separatist party that was wrongly blamed by the British government for the Easter Rising. In the aftermath of the Rising, survivors led by Éamon de Valera took over the party in the struggle for the establishment of an Irish republic. Ua Buachalla was elected as a Sinn Féin MP for Kildare North at the 1918 general election. He served in the First Dáil (1918–1921), and was re-elected to the Second Dáil in 1921 as a Teachta Dála (TD) for Kildare–Wicklow. He sided with de Valera and opposed the Anglo-Irish Treaty. He fought in the Four Courts in the Civil War. Imprisoned in Dundalk jail, he was released by the Anti-Treaty troops in August 1922. He lost his seat at the 1922 general election, and was an unsuccessful candidate at the 1923 general election.

== Irish governor-general ==
He joined Fianna Fáil on its foundation in 1926 and was elected as a Fianna Fáil TD for the Kildare constituency at the June 1927 general election, only to lose that seat in the 1932 general election, which Fianna Fáil won. He was chosen by Éamon de Valera to become Governor-General of the Irish Free State following James McNeill's resignation in November 1932.

== Instruction to keep a low profile ==
De Valera explicitly instructed Ua Buachalla as Governor-General to keep a low public profile, and not to fulfil public engagements, which was part of de Valera's policy to make the office an irrelevance by reducing it to invisibility. While he continued to give royal assent to legislation, summon and dissolve Dáil Éireann and fulfil the other formal duties of the office, he declined all public invitations and kept himself invisible, as advised by his Government. In fact in his period in office he performed only one public function: the receipt of the credentials of the French Ambassador to Ireland in the Council Chamber, Government Buildings, 1933, on behalf of King George V. However, de Valera subsequently had that duty moved from the Governor-General to his own post of President of the Executive Council; instead of presenting his credentials to Ua Buachalla, the US Legation Minister, William Wallace McDowell, presented himself to de Valera.

One of the few other occasions that Ua Buachalla was mentioned at all in public was when, in the aftermath of the death of King George V in January 1936, he had to reply to messages of condolence sent to the Irish people by United States President Franklin D. Roosevelt and the United States Secretary of State Cordell Hull.

On de Valera's instruction, Ua Buachalla did not reside in the official residence of the Governor-General, the Viceregal Lodge (now called Áras an Uachtaráin, the residence of the President of Ireland). Instead, a house was rented for his use in Monkstown, outside of Dublin. The official English title "Governor-General" was largely replaced by the official Irish title "Seanascal" or its direct translation, "Seneschal"; however, "Governor-General" remained the legal form used in official English-language documents and proclamations. Ua Buachalla refused all but £2,000 of the £10,000 salary of the Governor-General.

== Falling out with de Valera ==
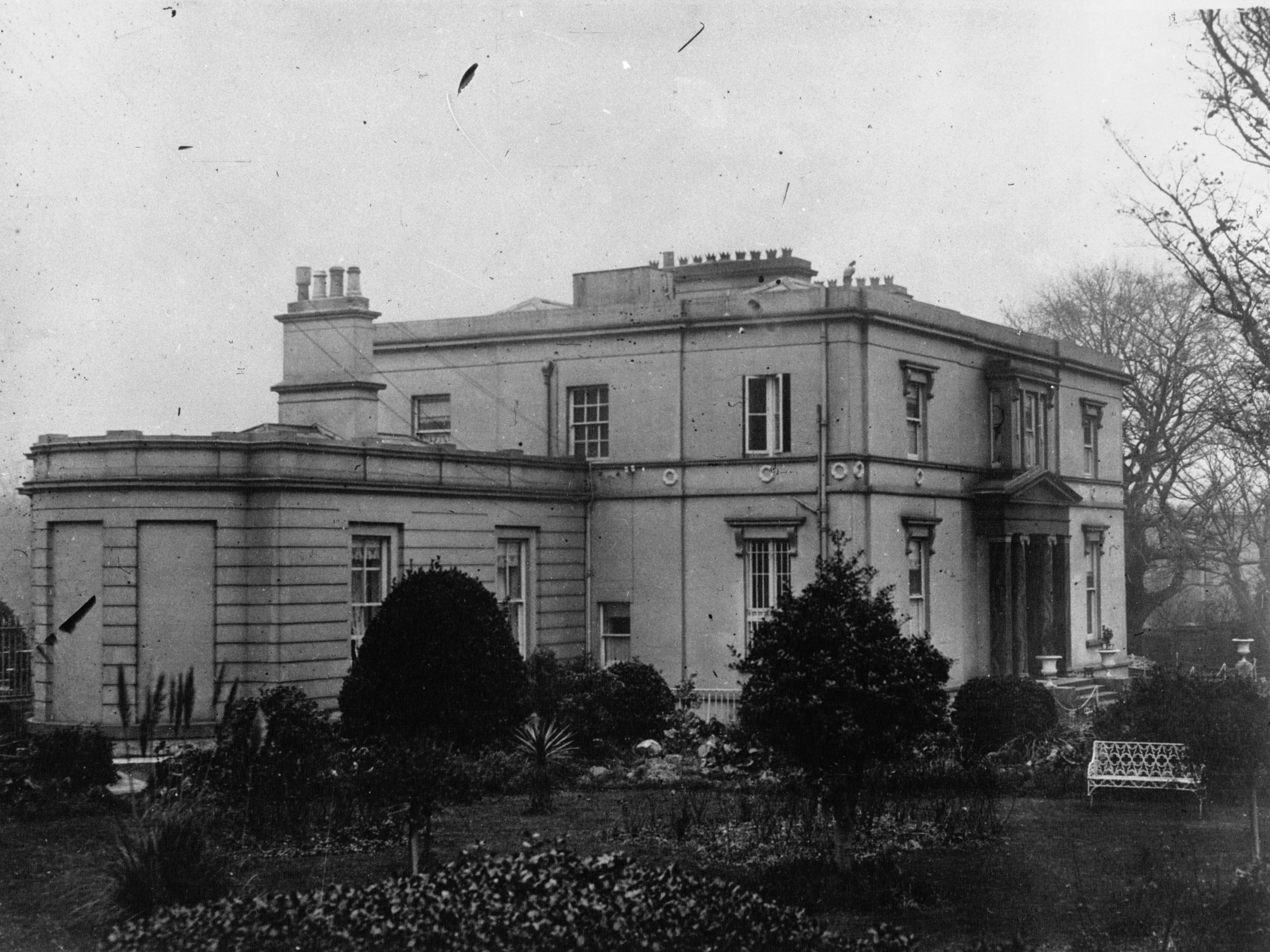
Gortleitragh House, Monkstown

Ua Buachalla fell out with de Valera over the manner of his exit from office, in December 1936. De Valera sought to use the abdication crisis surrounding King Edward VIII to amend the Irish Free State's Constitution to abolish both the Crown and the office of governor-general. Having done so, he faced a threat of a court case from Ua Buachalla, who had been left personally liable for the remaining one year's expensive private lease on his residence, following the sudden abolition of his office. In practice, between 1933 and December 1936, the Irish government had paid Ua Buachalla expenses, from which he paid the rent on the expensive residence which was picked for him.

However, from December 1936, the government insisted that it had no responsibility for paying for the residence. Ua Buachalla had, in 1932, on de Valera's explicit advice, leased the residence for a full five years, which was his expected term of office. There remained one year's outstanding lease, for a residence he could not now afford and for which he had no need now as he was no longer governor-general. Eventually, de Valera was forced to grant Ua Buachalla a large pension and to pay his outstanding rent and expenses to stop a potentially embarrassing court case going ahead. The residence, Gortleitragh, was then taken up by Eduard Hempel the German ambassador to Ireland.

Ua Buachalla attended the inauguration of the first President of Ireland, Douglas Hyde, in Dublin Castle in June 1938.

== Appointment to Council of State and later life ==
Ua Buachalla and de Valera reunited as political partners, and in a symbolic act of apology, de Valera, when elected President of Ireland in 1959 appointed Ua Buachalla to his advisory Council of State. However, he returned to Maynooth to continue running his family business, the hardware store which had been founded in 1853.

Domhnall Ua Buachalla died on 30 October 1963, aged 97, in a nursing home in Dublin. He was given a state funeral and buried in Laraghbryan Cemetery in Maynooth, with the graveside oration delivered by President de Valera.

The Ua Buachalla hardware store closed in October 2005. The road beside this store is named after him (although translated to English as "Buckley's Lane"). The building has been demolished, but some of the frontage has been preserved, with the building bearing the name "Buckley House".

Parliament of the United Kingdom
| Preceded by John O'Connor | Member of Parliament for Kildare North; 1918–1922 | Constituency abolished |
Oireachtas
| New constituency | Teachta Dála for Kildare North; 1918–1921 | Constituency abolished |
Political offices
| Preceded by James McNeill | Governor-General of the Irish Free State; 1932–1936 | Office abolished |

| Dáil | Election | Deputy (Party) | Deputy (Party) | Deputy (Party) | Deputy (Party) | Deputy (Party) |
|---|---|---|---|---|---|---|
| 2nd | 1921 | Erskine Childers (SF) | Domhnall Ua Buachalla (SF) | Robert Barton (SF) | Christopher Byrne (SF) | Art O'Connor (SF) |
| 3rd | 1922 | Hugh Colohan (Lab) | James Everett (Lab) | Robert Barton (AT-SF) | Christopher Byrne (PT-SF) | Richard Wilson (FP) |
| 4th | 1923 | Constituency abolished. See Kildare and Wicklow | | | | |

| Dáil | Election | Deputy (Party) | Deputy (Party) | Deputy (Party) |
|---|---|---|---|---|
| 4th | 1923 | Hugh Colohan (Lab) | John Conlan (FP) | George Wolfe (CnaG) |
| 5th | 1927 (Jun) | Hugh Colohan (Lab) | Domhnall Ua Buachalla (FF) | George Wolfe (CnaG) |
| 6th | 1927 (Sep) | Hugh Colohan (Lab) | Domhnall Ua Buachalla (FF) | George Wolfe (CnaG) |
| 6th | 1931 by-election | Thomas Harris (FF) | Domhnall Ua Buachalla (FF) | George Wolfe (CnaG) |
| 7th | 1932 | Thomas Harris (FF) | William Norton (Lab) | Sydney Minch (CnaG) |
| 8th | 1933 | Thomas Harris (FF) | William Norton (Lab) | Sydney Minch (CnaG) |
| 9th | 1937 | Constituency abolished. See Carlow–Kildare | | |

| Dáil | Election | Deputy (Party) | Deputy (Party) | Deputy (Party) | Deputy (Party) | Deputy (Party) |
|---|---|---|---|---|---|---|
| 13th | 1948 | William Norton (Lab) | Thomas Harris (FF) | Gerard Sweetman (FG) | 3 seats until 1961 | 3 seats until 1961 |
| 14th | 1951 | William Norton (Lab) | Thomas Harris (FF) | Gerard Sweetman (FG) | 3 seats until 1961 | 3 seats until 1961 |
| 15th | 1954 | William Norton (Lab) | Thomas Harris (FF) | Gerard Sweetman (FG) | 3 seats until 1961 | 3 seats until 1961 |
| 16th | 1957 | William Norton (Lab) | Patrick Dooley (FF) | Gerard Sweetman (FG) | 3 seats until 1961 | 3 seats until 1961 |
| 17th | 1961 | William Norton (Lab) | Patrick Dooley (FF) | Gerard Sweetman (FG) | Brendan Crinion (FF) | 4 seats 1961–1969 |
| 17th | 1964 by-election | Terence Boylan (FF) | Patrick Dooley (FF) | Gerard Sweetman (FG) | Brendan Crinion (FF) | 4 seats 1961–1969 |
| 18th | 1965 | Terence Boylan (FF) | Patrick Norton (Lab) | Gerard Sweetman (FG) | Brendan Crinion (FF) | 4 seats 1961–1969 |
| 19th | 1969 | Terence Boylan (FF) | Paddy Power (FF) | Gerard Sweetman (FG) | 3 seats 1969–1981 | 3 seats 1969–1981 |
| 19th | 1970 by-election | Terence Boylan (FF) | Paddy Power (FF) | Patrick Malone (FG) | 3 seats 1969–1981 | 3 seats 1969–1981 |
| 20th | 1973 | Joseph Bermingham (Lab) | Paddy Power (FF) | Patrick Malone (FG) | 3 seats 1969–1981 | 3 seats 1969–1981 |
| 21st | 1977 | Joseph Bermingham (Lab) | Paddy Power (FF) | Charlie McCreevy (FF) | 3 seats 1969–1981 | 3 seats 1969–1981 |
| 22nd | 1981 | Joseph Bermingham (Lab) | Paddy Power (FF) | Charlie McCreevy (FF) | Bernard Durkan (FG) | Alan Dukes (FG) |
| 23rd | 1982 (Feb) | Joseph Bermingham (Lab) | Paddy Power (FF) | Charlie McCreevy (FF) | Gerry Brady (FF) | Alan Dukes (FG) |
| 24th | 1982 (Nov) | Joseph Bermingham (Lab) | Paddy Power (FF) | Charlie McCreevy (FF) | Bernard Durkan (FG) | Alan Dukes (FG) |
| 25th | 1987 | Emmet Stagg (Lab) | Paddy Power (FF) | Charlie McCreevy (FF) | Bernard Durkan (FG) | Alan Dukes (FG) |
| 26th | 1989 | Emmet Stagg (Lab) | Seán Power (FF) | Charlie McCreevy (FF) | Bernard Durkan (FG) | Alan Dukes (FG) |
| 27th | 1992 | Emmet Stagg (Lab) | Seán Power (FF) | Charlie McCreevy (FF) | Bernard Durkan (FG) | Alan Dukes (FG) |
| 28th | 1997 | Constituency abolished. See Kildare North and Kildare South | | | | |
