= Senior counsel =

Senior lawyer in some jurisdictions

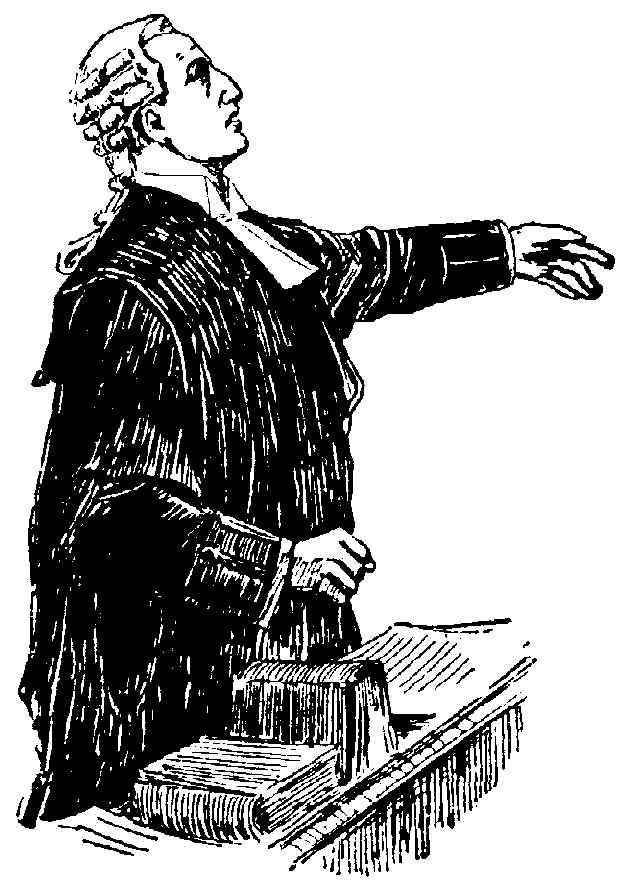
Artist's depiction of an early 19th-century English barrister

Senior Counsel, State Counsel (post-nominal letters: SC), or Senior Advocate is a title given to senior lawyers in some current or former Commonwealth nations, mainly those in which the British monarch is no longer head of state, making the title "King's Counsel" obsolete. Examples of such nations are Mauritius, Zambia, India (Senior Advocate), Bangladesh (Senior Advocate), Hong Kong, Ireland, South Africa, Kenya, Malawi, Singapore, Guyana and Trinidad and Tobago. Jurisdictions that have retained the monarch as head of state, but have nonetheless opted for the new title, include some states and territories of Australia, as well as Belize.

Just as a junior counsel is "called to the [Outer] Bar", a Senior Counsel is, in some jurisdictions, said to be "called to the Inner Bar". Senior Counsels may informally style themselves silks, as do their British counterparts.

== Dress ==
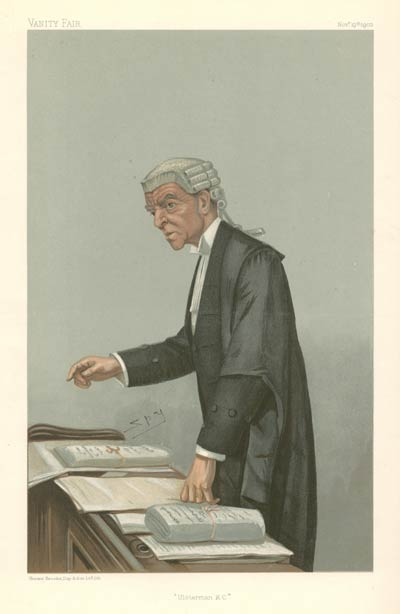
An example of dress in court

In Hong Kong, every Senior Counsel must wear a black robe and silk gown together with a wig when appearing in open court. In Ireland, Senior Counsel wear a silk gown which differs from that of a Junior Counsel; the wig is optional.

== Australia ==
The rank of Senior Counsel has also been introduced in most states and territories of Australia, even though the King remains head of state. Between 1993 and 2008, all Australian jurisdictions except the Northern Territory replaced the title of Queen's Counsel with that of Senior Counsel. However, in 2013, Queensland restored the rank of Queen's Counsel and there was talk of other Australian states following suit. On 3 February 2014, the Victorian Attorney-General announced that the rank of Queen's Counsel would shortly be reinstated in the State of Victoria, with existing and future Senior Counsels having the option to apply to be issued with letters patent appointing them QCs; some 89% of barristers entitled to be called Senior Counsel were reported to have applied. On 18 February 2019, the South Australian Government restored the rank of QC.

== Barbados ==
The title of Senior Counsel has replaced that of King's Counsel in Barbados, which became a republic on 30 November 2021. Existing KCs are not required to adopt the new title, but all new appointments will be as SC only.

== Belize ==
Belize uses the title of Senior Counsel, even though Charles III is head of state as King of Belize.

== Hong Kong ==
"Senior Counsel" (Chinese: 資深大律師) replaced QC in the law of Hong Kong after the United Kingdom transferred sovereignty over the territory to China in 1997. All QCs became SCs automatically.

== India ==
A member of the bar can be designated as a Senior Advocate following a selection process that employs various criteria. The designation can be carried out by the Supreme Court directly or by the relevant state High Court. In August 2018, the Supreme Court issued guidelines to regulate the conferment of Senior Advocate status. Senior Advocates' gowns have a flap at the back to distinguish them from those of junior counsel.

== Ireland ==
The Irish Free State came into existence in December 1922 as a dominion within the British Commonwealth of Nations. John O'Byrne was the sole King's Counsel appointed after independence, in June 1924, when he was Attorney General of Ireland. Shortly after the Courts of Justice Act 1924 came into effect, Chief Justice Hugh Kennedy, in conjunction with the Bar Council of Ireland, revived the issue of patents of precedence, which had been used in the 18th and 19th century as an alternative to KC patents, but had fallen into disuse from 1883 as the strictures formerly associated with the rank of KC were abolished. The Irish Free State patent wording was based on that issued to Daniel O'Connell; the recipient would be styled "Senior Counsel" (SC; Irish: abhcóide sinsir or abhcóide sinsearach). (Note: The official Irish equivalent of "senior counsel" is abhcóide sinsir since 1949, though the previous standard abhcóide sinsearach remains common. There is no official Irish abbreviation equivalent to "SC", but "AS" would be an unofficial translation.)

According to the view held at the time, the "privilege of patent" was part of the royal prerogative within the Irish Free State. (Note: This view was subsequently rejected by the Supreme Court of Ireland in 1972 and 1988 rulings that the 1922 constitution had abolished the royal prerogative; these decisions, in turn, have been criticised by jurists.) The early patents were issued under the Irish Free State's Internal Great Seal by the Governor-General as the King's representative, on the advice of the Executive Council. On 14 July 1924, the Chief Justice called the first recipients to the "within the bar" and bestowed their patents. The form of the 1924 patent omitted the appointment as "one of our counsel learned in the law" from the KC patent, but retained its grant of "precedence and preaudience" to rank next after the previously appointed KC or SC. The Constitution (Amendment No. 27) Act 1936 abolished the office of Governor-General and the Executive Powers (Consequential Provisions) Act 1937 was held to have transferred the royal prerogative to the Executive Council. Although the 1937 Constitution of Ireland created the office of President of Ireland, it was still the Taoiseach as head of government who signed patents of precedence under the Executive Powers (Consequential Provisions) Act 1937.

The title "KC" continued to be used by many Senior Counsel, both those created before July 1924 and those after. Sir John Esmonde complained that wartime censors had changed "KC" to "SC" in a press release about a 1943 election candidate; they regarded "K.C." as pro-British and thus violating Irish neutrality. In 1949, shortly before the coming into force of the Republic of Ireland Act 1948, which created the Republic of Ireland and broke the final link with the British Crown, Frank Aiken asked John A. Costello during Taoiseach's questions "whether, in view of the fact that certain members of the Inner Bar who received their patents as senior counsel continue to describe themselves as king's counsel, he will introduce a bill entitled an act to declare that the description of a senior counsel shall be senior counsel"; Costello said he had "no intention of wasting public time and money" on the idea. As late as the 1960s, R. G. L. Leonard (made KC before 1922) was described in the official Irish law reports as "Queen's Counsel", reflecting the British change from King to Queen on 6 February 1952.

The Legal Services Regulation Act 2015 provides for the Legal Services Regulatory Authority (LSRA) to establish an Advisory Committee on the grant of Patents of Precedence. The committee comprises the Chief Justice, the Presidents of the Court of Appeal and High Court, the Attorney General, heads of the Bar Council and Law Society of Ireland, and a lay member appointed by the Minister for Justice. The relevant part of the 2015 act was commenced in 2019. It allows the bestowal of the title "Senior Counsel" on solicitors. The LSRA advisory committee replaces an earlier advisory committee which had no statutory basis, and no solicitor or lay member. The 2015 Act also specifies the criteria for both solicitors and barristers:

(a) has, in his or her practice as a legal practitioner, displayed—

(i) a degree of competence and a degree of probity appropriate to and consistent with the grant to him or her of a Patent,
(ii) professional independence, and
(iii) one or more of the following:

(I) a proven capacity for excellence in the practice of advocacy;
(II) a proven capacity for excellence in the practice of specialist litigation; or
(III) specialist knowledge of an area of law;

(b) is suitable on grounds of character and temperament;
(c) is in possession of a tax clearance certificate that is in force;
(d) is otherwise suitable to be granted a Patent.

It is still the government which grants the patent of privilege and the Chief Justice of Ireland who calls patentees to the Inner Bar. As of 2020, there were about 325 SCs among about 2,300 barristers registered with the Bar Council of Ireland. On 1 September 2020 the cabinet approved the first batch of 37 recommendations of the LSRA advisory committee. These were appointed senior counsel the following day, including the first 17 (out of 60 applicants) solicitors.

In Northern Ireland, the appointment of KCs and QCs has continued since 1921, as in the rest of the United Kingdom. In 1983, Richard Ferguson, former head of the Northern Ireland bar, was called to the Inner Bar in Dublin, becoming the first to be simultaneously both a QC and an SC. Conversely, the first SC to become a QC was Paddy MacEntee in 1985.

Anyone conferred silk in both Northern Ireland and the Republic of Ireland is entitled to use both K.C. and S.C. postnominal letters.

== New Zealand ==
The title "Senior Counsel" was briefly used in New Zealand from 2007 until 2009, but was abolished by the following government. Those appointed as Senior Counsel were given the option of becoming QCs or of remaining SCs.

== Singapore ==
"Senior Counsel" is used in the law of Singapore. There is no independent bar in Singapore and Senior Counsel practice as members of law firms. Prior to independence, select members were given the title of KC or QC.

== South Africa ==
"Senior Counsel" (Afrikaans: Senior Advokaat) replaced QC in South Africa after the Union became a republic on 31 May 1961, with appointments being made by the State President until 1994, when the office was succeeded by that of President. A judge in the High Court in the province of Gauteng ruled that under the 1993 constitution, the president did not have the power to grant Senior Counsel status. This judgment has been overturned by the Supreme Court of Appeal of South Africa and also the Constitutional Court of South Africa. See Advocate § South Africa.

== United Kingdom ==
In the United Kingdom, the position of senior counsel (lowercase) is used to denote an experienced solicitor (who need not be an advocate), who is not on the path to partnership. This position is therefore analogous to the American title of counsel and is not directly comparable to the position of King's Counsel/Senior Counsel, which is held by barristers.

== Similar titles ==
Other jurisdictions have adopted similar titles:

- Senior Advocate under the law of Bangladesh, that of Pakistan, and that of Nigeria (see Senior Advocate of Nigeria).
- President's Counsel in Sri Lanka. In contrast, state counsels are the public prosecutors in the legal system of Sri Lanka.
- Senior Advocate of Nigeria - first conferred in 1975 as a replacement for Queen's Counsel, which ceased to be conferred when Nigeria became a republic in late 1963. Some Nigerian Q.C.s also gained appointments as S.A.N.s - and used both postnominal letters.
