= Constitution (Amendment No. 27) Act 1936 =

Irish constitutional amendment of 1936

The Constitution (Amendment No. 27) Act 1936 was an amendment to the Constitution of the Irish Free State that removed all reference to the King, to the office of Governor-General, and almost completely eliminated the King's constitutional role in the state. Under the Act most of the functions previously performed by the King and his Governor-General were transferred to various other organs of the Irish government. The only role retained by the King was as representative of the state in foreign affairs. The amendment passed through the Oireachtas at the same time as the External Relations Act, becoming law on 11 December 1936. Its long title was:

An Act to effect certain amendments of the Constitution in relation to the executive authority and power and in relation to the performance of certain executive functions.

Due to deficiencies in the External Relations Act, the Executive Powers (Consequential Provisions) Act 1937 was passed in the following year to finally eliminate the office of Governor-General.

== Timing ==
The opportunity for this amendment arose because the Irish Free State was then a member of the Commonwealth, and each of its members had to assent to the abdication of Edward VIII on 10 December 1936. The amendment was passed before the passing of the Executive Authority (External Relations) Act 1936 on 12 December which assented to the abdication. The policy of the Irish government was to reduce any remaining British links in the political system of the Irish Free State and to turn it into a republic.

== Transfer of royal competences ==
After the adoption of the Act the duties usually performed by a head of state were distributed among a number of organs. Most importantly, the power to exercise the executive authority was vested explicitly in the Executive Council (cabinet), the right to appoint the President of the Executive Council (prime minister) was transferred to Dáil Éireann (the sole house of the Oireachtas or parliament), and the duty of promulgating the law was vested in the Ceann Comhairle, chairman of the Dáil. The King retained only a role in foreign affairs.

Function	Before	After	Under the 1937 Constitution
Executive authority	"Vested" in the King. Exercised on his behalf by the Governor-General, acting on the advice of the Executive Council.	Exercised by the Executive Council.	Exercised by the Executive Council, itself renamed as the Government.
Appointment of President of the Executive Council	Appointed by the Governor-General "on the nomination" of Dáil Éireann.	Elected by Dáil Éireann.	Renamed as Taoiseach, appointed by the President of Ireland "on the nomination" of Dáil Éireann.
Appointment of remainder of Executive Council	Appointed by the Governor-General "on the nomination" of the president and with the assent of Dáil Éireann.	Appointed by the President of the Executive Council with the assent of Dáil Éireann.	Appointed by the President "on the nomination" of the Taoiseach and with the assent of Dáil Éireann.
Composition of the Oireachtas	Consists of the King and Dáil Éireann. (The Seanad had been abolished earlier in 1936)	Consists only of Dáil Éireann.	Consists of the President, Dáil Éireann and a restored Seanad.
Convention and dissolution of the Oireachtas	By the Governor-General 'on the advice' of the Executive Council.	By the Ceann Comhairle on the direction of the Executive Council and its president.	By the President 'on the advice' of the Taoiseach.
Signing bills into law	Royal Assent given by Governor-General.	Signed into law by the Ceann Comhairle, who may not veto a bill.	Signed into law by the President, who may not veto a bill, but can refer it to the Supreme Court.
Appointment of judges	By the Governor-General on the 'advice' of the Executive Council.	By the Executive Council.	By the President on the 'advice' of the Government.

== Governor-General ==
The Act purported to abolish the office of Governor-General. However Éamon de Valera was advised by his Attorney-General, James Geoghegan, the Secretary to the Executive Council, Maurice Moynihan, and Mr Matheson of the Parliamentary Draftsman's office that that Act did not actually abolish the office as it had an existence independent of the Constitution; to conclusively abolish the office, a blanket transfer of any remaining powers of the Governor-General would be necessary, and remaining references to the Governor-Generalship would need to be removed from Acts of the Oireachtas. In May 1937 de Valera introduced the Executive Powers (Consequential Provisions) Act 1937 to do just that, as well as to validate the installation of the Chief Justice of the Supreme Court, who had failed (or declined) to make the legally required declaration of office in front of the Governor-General, and to validate the appointment of a new Attorney-General, who under existing law could only be appointed by the Governor-General.

== Foreign affairs ==
After the enactment of the Act, the King was no longer specifically mentioned in the Constitution. However, the amendment introduced a new provision that, without explicitly referring to the King, allowed the state to continue to use him as its representative in foreign affairs by passing a law allowing him to perform this function. A law for this purpose, the External Relations Act, was passed shortly after the amendment was enacted. Thus, after December 1936 treaties continued to be signed in the name of the King, and the King continued to accredit Irish ambassadors and high commissioners and to receive the Letters of Credence of foreign diplomats. The provision allowing the King to do this was inserted in Article 51 and read:

... it shall be lawful for the Executive Council, to the extent and subject to any conditions which may be determined by law to avail, for the purposes of the appointment of diplomatic and consular agents and the conclusion of international agreements of any organ used as a constitutional organ for the like purposes by [other nations of the Commonwealth].

The current Constitution of Ireland, enacted in 1937, created the position of President of Ireland as head of state, but did not give the position any external functions. The External Relations Act thus created, for a number of years, a situation in which it was unclear whether the King remained the head of state for external purposes. This situation came to an end in 1949 when the Republic of Ireland Act came into force, removing the King's role in foreign affairs and making the President of Ireland de jure head of state for all purposes. This new status was celebrated by President Seán T. O'Kelly paying the first ever state visit by an Irish president abroad.

== Expiry ==
The Amendment became obsolete on the repeal of the 1922 Constitution on the adoption of the Constitution of Ireland in 1937, and was repealed as spent law by the Statute Law Revision Act 2016.

== See also ==
- History of the Republic of Ireland
- Irish head of state from 1922 to 1949
