= History of the Republic of Ireland =

The Irish state came into being in 1919 as the 32 county Irish Republic. In 1922, having seceded from the United Kingdom of Great Britain and Ireland under the Anglo-Irish Treaty, it became the Irish Free State. It comprised 26 counties, with 6 counties under the control of Unionists; which became Northern Ireland in 1921. Bunreacht na hÉireann 1937 constitution renamed the 26 states 'Ireland'. In 1949, only 26 counties explicitly became a republic under the terms of the Republic of Ireland Act 1948, definitively ending its tenuous membership of the British Commonwealth. In 1973 the Republic of Ireland joined the European Communities (EC) as a member state which would later become the European Union (EU).

Upon its foundation, the Irish Free State was embroiled in a civil war between nationalists supporting the Treaty and opponents who supported the existing Republic. The pro-Treaty side, organised as Cumann na nGaedheal, emerged victorious from the conflict and won subsequent elections. They formed the government of the state until 1932, when they peacefully handed over power to the anti-Treaty faction in Fianna Fáil, who defeated them in an election. The Irish state, despite its violent beginnings, has remained a democracy throughout its existence. Changes in the 1930s removed many of the links with Britain established under the Treaty and Ireland's neutrality in the Second World War demonstrated its independence in foreign policy matters from Britain.

In the economic sphere, the Irish state has had a mixed performance. On independence, it was one of the wealthier countries in Europe per head of population. However it also inherited from British rule the problems of unemployment, emigration, uneven geographical development and lack of a native industrial base. For much of its history, the state struggled to rectify these problems. Particular peaks of emigration were recorded during the 1930s, 1950s and 1980s, when the Irish economy recorded little growth.

In the 1930s, Fianna Fáil governments attempted to create Irish domestic industries using subsidies and protective tariffs. In the late 1950s, these policies were dropped in favour of free trade with selected countries and encouraging of foreign investment with low taxes. This was expanded when Ireland entered the European Economic Community in 1973. In the 1990s and 2000s, Ireland experienced an economic boom known as the Celtic Tiger, in which the country's GDP surpassed many of its European neighbours. Immigration also surpassed emigration, bringing the state's population up to over 4 million. However, since 2008, Ireland has experienced a severe crisis in the banking sector and with sovereign debt. The resultant economic slump has deepened the effect of the world recession on Ireland till 2012. Since 2012 unemployment rates and the economy has grown except around Covid. In the global GDP per capita tables, Ireland ranks 4th of 186 in the IMF table and 4th of 187 in the World Bank ranking.

From 1937 to 1998, the Irish constitution included an irredentist claim on Northern Ireland as a part of the national territory. However, the state also opposed and used its security forces against those armed groups – principally the Provisional Irish Republican Army – who tried to unite Ireland by force. This occurred in the 1950s, throughout the 1970s and 1980s and has continued on a reduced scale. Irish governments meanwhile tried to broker an agreement to the conflict known as the Troubles within Northern Ireland from 1968 to the late 1990s. The British government officially recognised the right of the Irish government to be a party to the Northern negotiations in the Anglo-Irish Agreement of 1985. In 1998, as part of the Good Friday Agreement, the Irish constitution was altered by referendum to remove the territorial claim to Northern Ireland and instead extend the right of Irish citizenship to all the people of the island should they wish to have it.

== Background to independence ==
=== Separatism, rebellion and partition ===
From the Acts of Union 1800 in 1801 until 6 December 1922 the whole of Ireland was part of the United Kingdom of Great Britain and Ireland. However, from the 1880s, there had been long-standing nationalist agitation for autonomy or Home Rule. Other, more radical voices such as the Irish Republican Brotherhood called for independence, but these were in a minority.

In 1912–1913, the Liberal government in Britain proposed a Bill for Home Rule. Alarmed, unionists in the north organized the Ulster Volunteers, an armed militia proposing to resist Home Rule by force. Nationalists in response founded the Irish Volunteers. Arising out of this stand off, the partition of Ireland was proposed in three way talks between the Irish Parliamentary Party, the Unionist Party and the British government. In 1914, the UK Parliament enacted a Third Irish Home Rule Bill but suspended its effect until after World War I.

The nationalist leader John Redmond pledged support for the British war effort and many Irishmen served in the British Army (see Ireland and World War I), but the war and the frustration of nationalist ambitions regarding Home Rule led to a radicalisation of Irish nationalism. In 1916, a group of IRB activists within the Irish Volunteers led an insurrection aimed at Irish independence in Dublin, known as the Easter Rising. The rebellion did not have popular support and was put down within a week, but the execution of its leaders, and the subsequent wholesale arrest of radical nationalist activists proved very unpopular with the nationalist public. Coming directly after the Rising, a further attempt was made at the Irish Convention to resolve the impasse over Home Rule, but without success. Finally, the British proposal to extend conscription for the war to Ireland provoked widespread resistance, (see Conscription Crisis of 1918) and discredited the Irish Parliamentary Party who had supported the British war effort.

All of these factors led to a swing towards support for Sinn Féin – the party which was led by veterans of the Easter Rising and which stood for an independent Irish Republic. In the 1918 general election, Sinn Féin won 73 of the 105 seats, many of which were uncontested. Sinn Féin's elected candidates refused to attend the UK Parliament at Westminster and instead assembled in Dublin as a new revolutionary parliament called Dáil Éireann. They then declared the existence of a new state called the Irish Republic and established a system of government to rival the institutions of the United Kingdom.

The first meeting of the Dáil coincided with an unauthorised shooting of two RIC men in Tipperary, now regarded as the outbreak of the Irish War of Independence. From 1919 to 1921 the Irish Volunteers (now renamed as the Irish Republican Army, being deemed by the Dáil to be the army of the new Irish Republic) engaged in guerrilla warfare against the British army, the RIC and paramilitary police units known as the Black and Tans and Auxiliaries. The violence started out slowly, with only 19 deaths in 1919, but escalated sharply from the second half of 1920 and in the first six months of 1921 alone there were 1,000 deaths on all sides. The principle political leader of the republican movement was Éamon de Valera – the President of the Republic. However he spent much of the conflict in the United States, raising money and support for the Irish cause. In his absence, two young men, Michael Collins and Richard Mulcahy rose to prominence as the clandestine leaders of the IRA – respectively Director of Intelligence and Chief of Staff of the guerrilla organisation.

There were several failed attempts to negotiate an end to the conflict. In the summer of 1920, the British government proposed the Government of Ireland Act 1920 (which passed into law on 3 May 1921) that envisaged the partition of the island of Ireland into two autonomous regions Northern Ireland (six northeastern counties) and Southern Ireland (the rest of the island, including its most northerly county, Donegal). However, this was not acceptable to southern republicans and only the entity of Northern Ireland was established under the Act in 1921. The political entity of Southern Ireland was superseded in 1922 by the creation of the Irish Free State.

After further failed talks in December 1920, the guerrilla conflict was brought to an end in July 1921, with a truce agreed between the IRA and the British. Talks were then formally begun in pursuit of a peace settlement.

To some extent, the War of Independence exposed political and religious fissures in Irish society. The IRA killed over 200 civilians as alleged informers in the conflict. It has been alleged that groups like Protestants and ex-servicemen were disproportionately represented in this figure – an argument disputed by other historians. However whether due to violence and intimidation or due to their loyalty to the British presence in Ireland, between 1911 and 1926 some 34 percent of the Free State's Protestant population – or about 40,000 people – left the 26 counties, mostly for Northern Ireland or Great Britain. While there were many reasons for this, secession from the United Kingdom was a factor in Protestant emigration.

=== Anglo-Irish Treaty ===
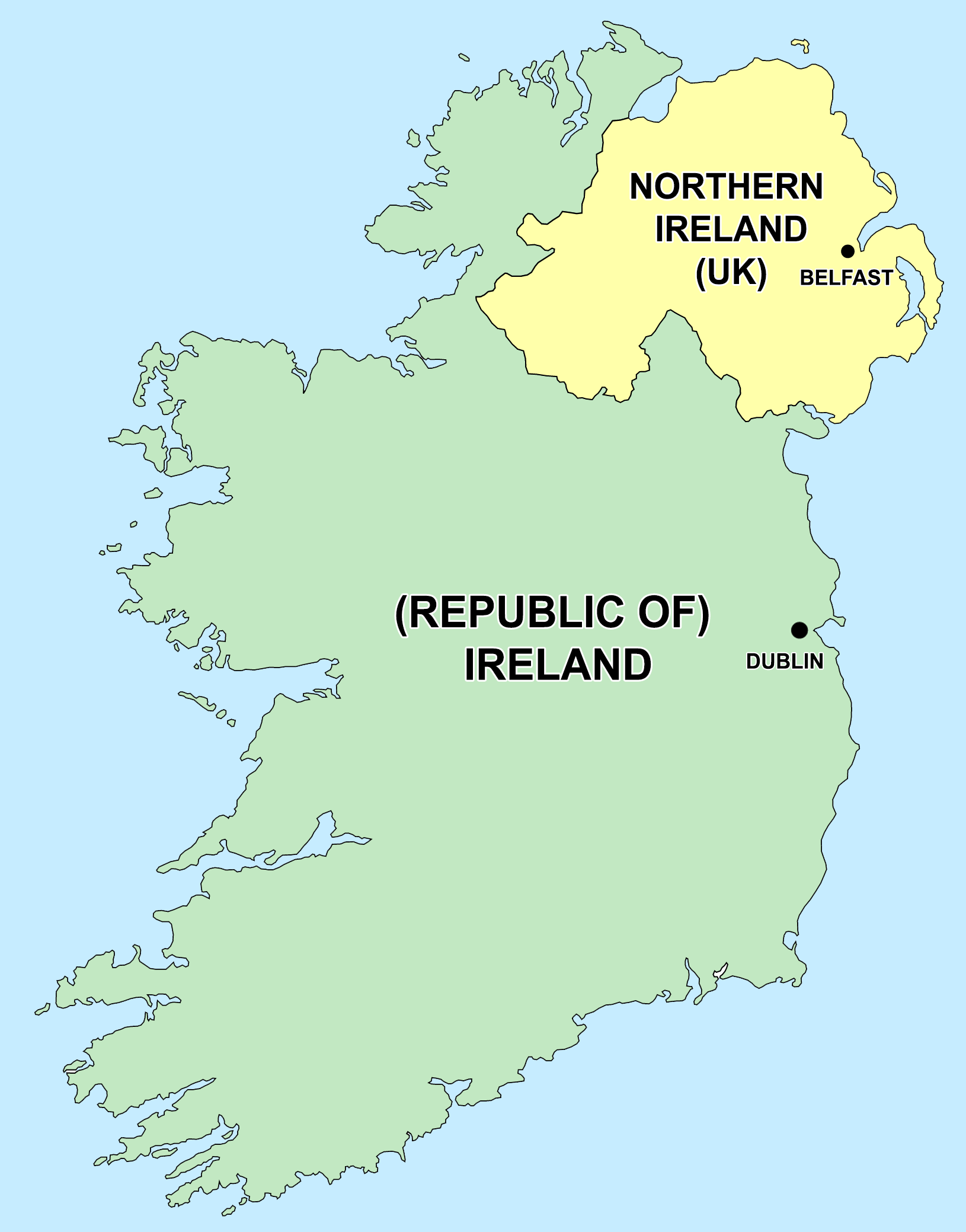
Political map of the island of Ireland today showing Northern Ireland (part of the UK) and the Republic of Ireland

Negotiations between the British and Irish negotiating teams produced the Anglo-Irish Treaty, concluded on 6 December 1921. The Irish team was led by Michael Collins, who had organised the IRA intelligence during the War of Independence. The British team led by David Lloyd George and Winston Churchill were prepared to make concessions on Irish independence but would not concede a republic. Towards the end of negotiations, Lloyd George threatened, "immediate and terrible war" if the Irish did not accept the terms offered.

The Treaty envisaged a new system of Irish self-government, known as "dominion status", with a new state, to be called the Irish Free State. The Free State was considerably more independent than a Home Rule Parliament would have been. It had its own police and armed forces and control over its own taxation and fiscal policy, none of which had been envisaged under Home Rule. However, there were some limits to its sovereignty. It remained a dominion of the British Commonwealth and members of its parliament had to swear an oath of loyalty to the British monarch. The British also retained three naval bases, known as the Treaty Ports. In addition, the Irish state was obliged to honour the contracts of the existing civil service—with the exception of the Royal Irish Constabulary, which was disbanded, albeit with full pensions—payable by the Irish state.

There was also the question of partition, which pre-dated the Treaty but which was copper-fastened by it. In theory, Northern Ireland was included under the terms of the Treaty but under Article 12 was, given the option to opt out within a month. (See Irish Free State Constitution Act 1922) Thus for three days from midnight on 6 December 1922 the newly established Irish Free State, in theory included all of the island of Ireland (including Northern Ireland). However, in practice, Northern Ireland was already a functioning autonomous area by this time and it formally left the Irish Free State on 8 December 1922.

As a result of these limits to the Free State's sovereignty, and because the Treaty dismantled the Republic declared by nationalists in 1918, the Sinn Féin movement, the Dáil and the IRA were all deeply split over whether to accept the Treaty. Éamon de Valera, the President of the Republic was the most prominent leader of those who rejected the Treaty. Among other things, he objected to the fact that Collins and the negotiating team had signed it without the authorisation of the Dáil Cabinet.

=== Civil War ===
On a vote of 64 to 57, the Dáil narrowly passed the Anglo-Irish Treaty on 7 January 1922. Éamon de Valera, President of the Republic and several other cabinet members resigned in protest.

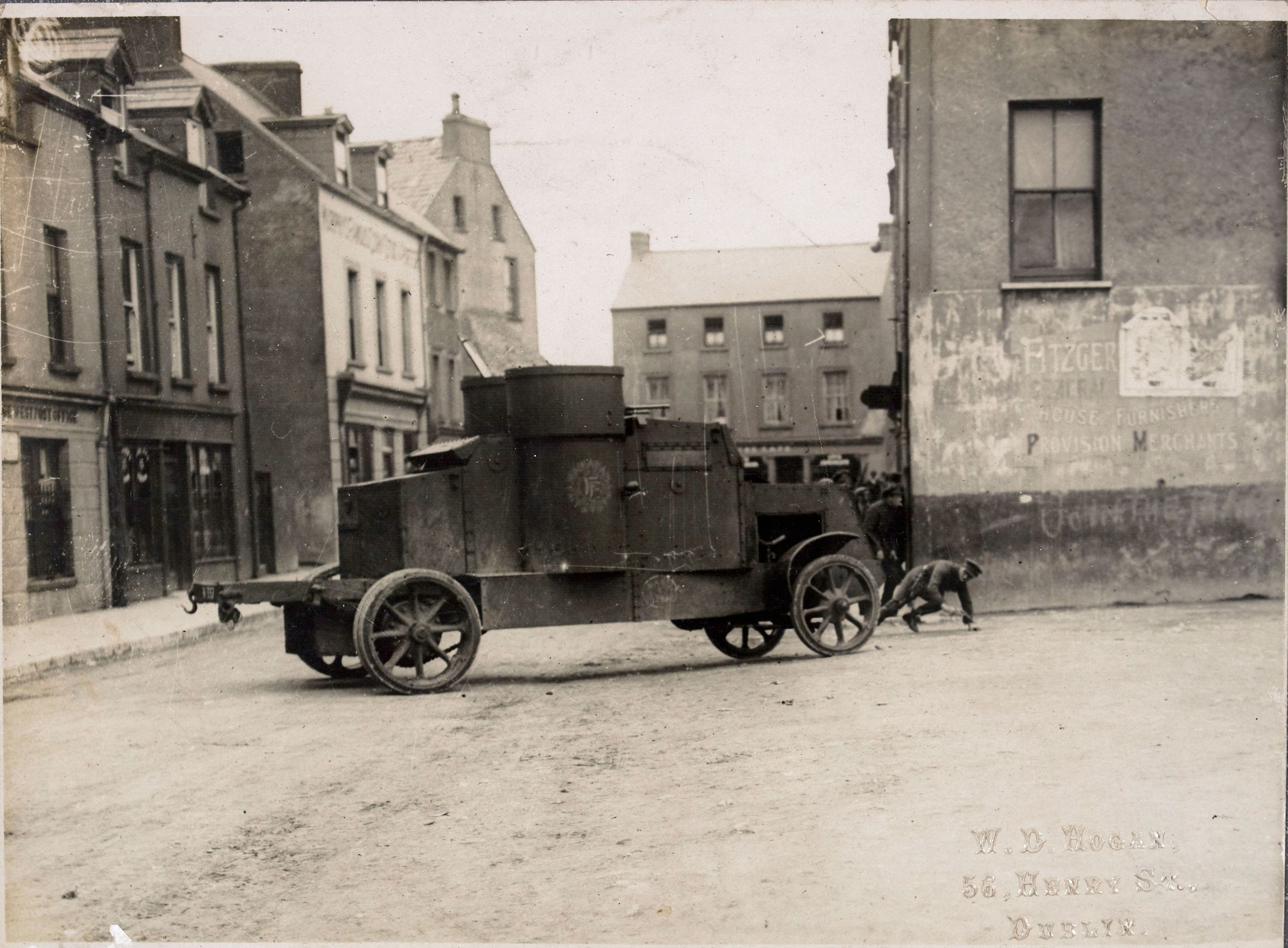
A National Army Peerless armoured car in Passage West, August 1922

The pro-Treaty leadership of Michael Collins and Arthur Griffith, organised in a Provisional Government, set about establishing the Irish Free State created by the Treaty. To this end, they began recruiting for a new army, based initially at Beggars Bush Barracks in Dublin, composed of pro-Treaty IRA units. They also began recruiting for a new police, the Civic Guard, to replace the RIC which was disbanded as of August 1922.

However a majority of the IRA led by Rory O'Connor opposed the Treaty, on the grounds that it disestablished the Irish republic, which they argued they were sworn to defend, and that it imposed a declaration of fidelity to the British monarch on Irish parliamentarians. The IRA held a convention in March 1922, in which they renounced their allegiance to the Dáil and vested it in their own Army Council. O'Connor in April led the occupation by anti-Treaty forces of several public buildings in Dublin, notably the Four Courts – centre of the Irish legal system. Éamon de Valera, while not in command of the anti-Treaty IRA, also led political opposition to the Treaty in a new party named Cumann na Poblachta.

With two rival Irish armed forces now in the country, civil war looked likely from the spring of 1922. Three events set it off. The first was the election of 18 June 1922, which the pro-Treaty Sinn Féin party won, giving the Free State a popular mandate. The second was the assassination by Irish republicans in London of a retired British general Henry Hughes Wilson. While it is not clear who ordered the killing, the British government assumed it was the anti-Treaty IRA and ordered Collins to act against them or risk armed British intervention to do it. The third trigger was the kidnapping by the IRA in the Four Courts of Free State general, JJ "Ginger" O'Connell. This combination of events forced the Collins government to assault and take the anti-Treaty positions in Dublin, which it succeeded in doing after a week's fighting in July 1922. Éamon de Valera declared his support for the anti-Treaty IRA after the outbreak of hostilities.

A further military offensive secured the Free State control over the other major towns and cities in its territory by the beginning of August. Despite their defeat in open warfare, the IRA regrouped and took up a guerrilla campaign, as they saw it, to restore the Irish Republic. The war dragged on in a guerrilla form until April 1923. In August 1922, the Free State was rocked by the death of its two main leaders. Michael Collins was killed in an ambush at Béal na mBláth, Cork, on 22 August 1922 and Arthur Griffith died of a stroke a week earlier. W. T. Cosgrave assumed control of both the Irish Republic's cabinet and the Provisional Government and both administrations disappeared simultaneously shortly afterwards, replaced by the institutions of the Irish Free State on 6 December 1922.

The anti-Treaty IRA under Liam Lynch tried to use the same guerrilla tactics against the Free State as they had against the British in 1919–1921. However, without the same degree of popular support, they were less effective. By late 1922, the Irish National Army had taken all the major towns in the country and reduced the IRA's campaign to small scale attacks. A very large number of anti-Treaty fighters, some 12,000 in all, were interned by the Free State. Moreover, as it went on the war produced acts of great cruelty on both sides. The Free State embarked on a policy of selective executions – 77 prisoners were judicially shot with over 100 more 'unofficially' killed in the field. The anti-Treaty forces assassinated one pro-Treaty member of Parliament, and several other civilian politicians, wounded more and burned their houses. However the Free State's tactics of internment and executions combined to cripple the anti-Treaty forces by April 1923.

The death in action of Liam Lynch in this month led to the anti-Treaty IRA, under the orders of Frank Aiken and on the urgings of civilian leader de Valera, calling a ceasefire and to "dump arms". There was no negotiated end to the war however.

The Civil War between Irish nationalists created a great deal of bitterness and the Civil War cleavage also produced the two main parties of independent Ireland in the 20th century. The number of dead has yet to be accurately counted but is considered to be around 2,000; at least as high as the number killed in the preceding War of Independence.

== The Irish state, 1922–1939 ==
Immediately after the Civil War, elections were held in which anti-Treaty Sinn Féin were allowed to participate. Although many of their candidates, including Éamon de Valera, were imprisoned, they won about one third of the vote. However the pro-Treaty side, organised in Cumann na nGaedheal, won a comfortable majority and went on to form the government of the new state until 1932.

The Cumann na nGaedheal governments, led by WT Cosgrave, were highly conservative – being more concerned with establishing the state's basic institutions after the havoc of the Civil War than with social or political reform. According to Kevin O'Higgins, the Minister for Justice, "we were the most conservative group of revolutionaries ever to have carried out a successful revolution".

The Irish Civil Service was largely inherited intact from the British and senior civil servants such as C.J. Gregg were 'lent' to the Irish from London to get the new state's bureaucracy off the ground. The new service, and especially its comptroller, Joseph Brennan were initially most concerned with balancing the state's budget and avoiding long-term in-debtedness The Free State printed its own notes (the punt), and minted its own coins but their value remained tied to British sterling currency until the 1970s.

Whereas the British had devolved much power to local government in the 1890s, one of the Free State's first acts was to abolish many of the powers of County Councils and replace them with unelected County managers. This was partly due to the allegiance of some councils to the anti-Treaty side in the Civil War, but also due to the belief that giving power to local government bred corruption. One of the major successes of the Cumann na nGaedheal governments was to establish the police, the Garda Síochána, as an unarmed and politically neutral force, relatively untainted by the bitterness of the civil war.

On the economic front, the Cosgrave administration saw its role as supporting the Irish agricultural export sector by consolidating farms and improving the quality of their produce. Ernest Blythe, the first Minister for Finance, in a bid to reduce the public debt, cut public expenditure from £42 million in 1923 to £27 million in 1926. The Cumann na nGeadhael governments did not see providing social services as a priority and instead cut income tax from 5 to 3 shillings. One exception to the generally low level of public spending was the Shannon hydroelectric scheme, which provided Ireland's first autonomous source of electricity.

While the last prisoners of the Civil War were released in 1924, the Free State retained extensive emergency powers to intern and even execute political opponents, under a series of Public Safety Acts (1923, 1926 and 1931). These powers were used after the IRA assassinated Minister Kevin O'Higgins (in revenge for the executions during the Civil War) in 1927 after which several hundred IRA suspects were interned.

=== Fianna Fáil comes to power ===
The political representatives of the anti-Treaty side had re-grouped in 1926 as Fianna Fáil, leaving only a minority of intransigent republicans in Sinn Féin and the IRA who refused to recognise the legitimacy of the state. Fianna Fáil initially refused to take their seats after being elected to the Dáil. However, they entered the parliament in 1927, in part to disassociate themselves from the killing of Kevin O'Higgins.

Initially Cumann na nGaedheal had been popular as the party that had established the state, but by 1932, their economic conservatism and continued repression of anti-Treaty Republicans was becoming unpopular. Fianna Fáil won the 1932 election on a programme of developing Irish industry, creating jobs, providing more social services and cutting the remaining links with the British Empire. In 1932, Fianna Fáil entered government in coalition with the Labour Party, but a year later they won an absolute majority. They would be in government without interruption until 1948 and for much of the rest of the 20th century.

One of Fianna Fáil's first actions in government was to legalise the IRA and to release imprisoned republicans. IRA members began attacking Cumann na nGaedhal supporters, who they considered "traitors" at rallies. This greatly antagonised pro-Treaty Civil War veterans, who in response formed the quasi-fascist Blueshirts (initially the "Army Comrades Association"), led by the former Garda Commissioner Eoin O'Duffy to oppose the IRA. There were frequent riots and occasional shootings between the two factions in the early 1930s. De Valera banned the Blueshirts in 1933, after a threatened march on the Dáil, in imitation of Mussolini's March on Rome. Not long afterwards, in 1936, de Valera made a clean break with political violence when he banned the increasingly left-wing IRA after they murdered a landlord's agent, Richard More O'Farrell, in a land dispute and fired shots at police during a strike of Tramway workers in Dublin. In 1939 it enacted the Offences against the State Act for the prosecution of illegal armed groups, an act similar to those passed by previous governments to combat dissident militant groups.

=== Economic nationalism and trade war with Britain ===
Fianna Fáil's economic programme marked a sharp break with their predecessors in Cumann na nGaedheal. Instead of free trade, which benefited mainly substantial farmers, Fianna Fáil pursued the nationalist aim of establishing Irish domestic industries, which were protected from foreign competitors by tariffs and subsidies. Fianna Fáil made it mandatory for foreign companies to have a quota of Irish members on their boards. They also set up a large number of semi-state companies such as the Electricity Supply Board and the Turf Development Board. While this state-led strategy had some positive results, emigration remained high throughout this period, with up to 75,000 leaving for Britain in the late 1930s.

In the course of their pursuit of economic independence, Fianna Fáil also provoked what is known as the Anglo-Irish Trade War with Britain in 1933, by refusing to continue paying back "land annuities" – money provided under the Land Purchase (Ireland) Act 1903 by the British Government to enable Irish farmers purchase their own land. The British in retaliation raised tariffs on Irish agricultural produces, hurting Ireland's export trade. De Valera in turn raised taxes on the importation of British goods. The burden of this standoff fell on the cattle farmers, who could no longer sell their cattle at competitive rates in Britain. Additionally the Fianna Fáil government continued to collect half the land annuities as taxation. Police and sometimes troops were used to seize cattle off farmers who would not or could not pay. Farmers aggrieved at these policies were one of the principal support bases of the Blueshirt movement

The dispute with Britain was finally settled in 1939. Half of the land annuity debt (c. £90 million) was written off and the rest paid as lump sum. The British also returned to Ireland the Treaty ports, which they had retained since the Treaty of 1922. Irish control over these bases made possible Irish neutrality in the looming Second World War.

=== Constitutional status ===
The Free State from 1922 to 1937 was a constitutional monarchy over which the British monarch reigned (from 1927 with the title "King of Ireland"). The Representative of the Crown was known as the Governor-General. The Free State had a bicameral parliament and a cabinet, called the "Executive Council" answerable to the lower house of parliament, the Free State Dáil. The head of government was called the President of the Executive Council.

The parliament of the UK passed The Statute of Westminster 1931, which granted legislative independence to the six Dominions, Australia, Canada, the Irish Free State, Newfoundland, New Zealand, and South Africa. In 1932, after Éamon de Valera and Fianna Fáil's victory in the general election, the 1922 Irish Free State constitution was amended through a series of legislative changes, was subsequently replaced with a new constitution. This document was drawn up by the de Valera administration. It was approved by the electorate in a plebiscite by a simple majority.

On 29 December 1937, the new "Constitution of Ireland" came into effect, renaming the Irish Free State to simply "Éire" or in the English language "Ireland". The Governor-General was replaced by a President of Ireland and a new more powerful prime minister, called the "Taoiseach", came into being, while the Executive Council was renamed the "Government". Though it had a president, the new state was not a republic. The British monarch continued to reign theoretically as "King of Ireland", and was used as an "organ" in international and diplomatic relations, with the President of Ireland relegated to symbolic functions within the state but never outside it.

=== Status of Northern Ireland ===
The Anglo–Irish Treaty provided that should Northern Ireland choose not to be included in the Free State, a Boundary Commission would be set up to revise the borders between the two jurisdictions. The Irish perspective was that this was intended to allow largely nationalist areas of Northern Ireland to join the Free State, and shortly after the establishment of the Free State this commission came into being. However the commission concentrated on economic and topographic factors, rather than the political aspirations of the people who would be living near the new border. In 1925, the Boundary Commission report, contrary to expectations, proposed ceding some small areas of the Free State to Northern Ireland. For a variety of reasons the governments agreed to accept the original Northern Ireland/Southern Ireland delineation in return for Britain dropping the Irish obligation to share in paying Britain's Imperial debts. The Dáil approved the boundary by a large margin of 71 to 20.

== World War II, neutrality, and "the Emergency" 1939–1945 ==
The outbreak of the Second World War put the state and the de Valera government in a difficult situation. It came under pressure from Britain and later the US, to enter the war, or at least to allow the allies to use its ports. However, there remained a minority who felt that national independence had yet to be achieved and who were resolutely opposed to any alliance with Britain. For this reason, de Valera ensured that the state remained neutral throughout the War which was officially known as the "Emergency". The state's decision to adopt neutrality was influenced by memories of the Anglo–Irish War and the Civil War, and the state's lack of military preparedness for involvement in a war.

The remnants of the IRA, which had split several times into ever smaller groupings since 1922, embarked on a bombing campaign in Britain (see Sabotage Campaign (IRA)) and some attacks in Northern Ireland (see Northern Campaign), intended to force a British withdrawal from Northern Ireland. Some of its leadership, notably Seán Russell, sought help from Nazi Germany for this project. De Valera, considering this activity a threat to Irish neutrality and therefore to the state's vital interests, interned all active IRA members and executed several. Another was hanged in Northern Ireland for shooting a policeman.

Behind the scenes the Irish state worked with the Allies; in 1940, the government agreed provisionally with Britain that it would accept the entry of British troops and put its own armed forces under their command should the Germans invade Ireland – see Plan W. There was a provisional German plan for an invasion of Ireland, known as Operation Green, but it was never carried out. Additionally, Irish fire fighters were sent to Northern Ireland to help fight the fires caused by the German bombing of Belfast in 1941 (See Belfast Blitz).

There were a number of further examples of cooperation. German pilots who crashed in Ireland were interned while Allied airmen were returned to Britain. There was also mutual sharing of intelligence. For example, the date of the D-Day Normandy landings was decided on the basis of transatlantic weather reports supplied by the Irish state. It is estimated that between 43,000 and 150,000 men from Ireland took part, with that number roughly evenly divided between Northern Ireland and the southern state.

Conversely, following the suicide of Adolf Hitler, de Valera, following diplomatic protocol, controversially offered condolences to the German ambassador.

Economically, the war was a difficult time for the state. Industrial production fell by 25%. Unlike the First World War, when Irish farmers had made substantial profits selling food to Britain, in the Second World War, Britain imposed strict price controls on Irish agricultural imports. Due to the war, imports to Ireland dried up, leading to a drive for self-sufficiency in food and strict rationing, which continued until the 1950s. Nevertheless, as a result of neutrality, Ireland emerged from the war having been spared the physical destruction and extreme hardship undergone by combatant nations on the European mainland.

== Relationship with Northern Ireland 1945–present ==
The official position of the Irish state, as laid out in the 1937 constitution, was that the territory of the state comprised the whole island of Ireland, but that its laws applied only to the territory of the Free State, as outlined in the 1922 Treaty. Thereafter the policies of Irish governments pursued the peaceful unification of Ireland through the pressure groups such as the anti-Partition League. However, at the same time, the state recognised that paramilitary groups – in particular the IRA – were also a threat to its own security. Furthermore, their attacks on Northern Ireland could drag the Irish state into an unwanted confrontation with Britain.

In the 1950s, the IRA launched a campaign of attacks on Northern security targets along the border (the Border Campaign). The Irish government first detained the IRA's leaders under the Offences Against the State Act and later introduced internment for all IRA activists. This helped to halt the campaign in its tracks, and the IRA called it off in 1962. In the aftermath of this episode, the southern government under Seán Lemass, himself an IRA veteran of the War of Independence and Civil War, tried to forge closer ties with the authorities in Northern Ireland to promote peaceful co-operation on the island. He and Northern premier Terence O'Neill exchanged visits, the first of the respective heads of state to do so since the very early days of partition in 1922.

However, in 1969, the Irish government found itself placed in a very difficult position when conflict erupted in Northern Ireland in the form of rioting in Derry, Belfast and other urban centres. The violence arose out of agitation by the Northern Ireland Civil Rights Association for the redress of grievances of Catholics and nationalists in Northern Ireland. Two episodes in particular caused concern – the Battle of the Bogside in Derry, in which nationalists fought the police for three days and the rioting in Belfast, in which several Catholic neighbourhoods were attacked and burned by loyalists.

Taoiseach Jack Lynch in a televised address, said, "we can not stand by and watch innocent people being injured and perhaps worse", comments taken to mean that Irish troops would be sent over the border to assist Northern nationalists. This was not done, but Irish Army field hospitals were set up and some money and arms were covertly supplied to nationalist groups for self-defence. Government ministers, Charles Haughey and Neil Blaney, were later put on trial for allegedly supplying arms to republican paramilitaries.

At the same time, the Provisional IRA, emerged from the 1969 rioting intending to launch an armed campaign against the Northern state. By 1972, their campaign was of considerable intensity, killing over 100 British soldiers in that year alone. Unlike the IRA campaign of the 1950s, this campaign was viewed as having considerable public support among Northern nationalists and for this reason, Irish governments did not introduce internment as they had previously, in the absence of a political settlement in Northern Ireland. The Irish government also refused to allow British and Northern Ireland security units to pursue Republican paramilitaries over the border into the Republic and arrested those soldiers or police who did enter its territory armed.

The Irish government, however, continued to view armed activity by republicans on its territory as a major security risk. The Gardaí and the Irish Army were used to try to impede the activities of republican paramilitary groups throughout the conflict in Northern Ireland known as the Troubles (c. 1968–1998). The paramilitaries' activities in the south included bank robberies, kidnappings and occasional attacks on the Irish security forces (killing 6 gardaí and one Irish soldier) as well as attacks on British forces over the border. Representatives of republican paramilitaries were forbidden from appearing on television or radio by Section 31 of the Broadcasting Act, (1971). There were also some attacks by loyalist paramilitary groups in the southern territory, notably the Dublin and Monaghan bombings of 1974, which killed 33 people.

However, the PIRA successfully used the South as a safe haven in order to sustain its campaign against the British in Northern Ireland, widely owing to the sympathy of the Southern Irish population. (Note: "The sheer level of sympathy and support that existed for militant republicanism [in the Republic of Ireland] demonstrates that the longevity of the ‘Troubles’ was due in large part to this widespread tolerance and aid. Former IRA volunteers attest to in interviews and previously unpublished accounts of training camps in the Republic. Juried courts for IRA suspects were phased out as both juries and judges were regularly acquitting republicans in cases of blatant IRA activity.") Irish historian Gearóid Ó Faoleán wrote for The Irish Times that "[t]hroughout the country, republicans were as much a part of their communities as any others. Many were involved in the GAA or other local organisations and their neighbours could, to paraphrase [Irish writer Tim Pat] Coogan, quietly and approvingly mutter about the 'boys' – and then go off without a qualm the next day to vote for a political party aggressively opposed to the IRA." Shannon Airport and Cork and Cobh harbours were used extensively by the IRA for arms importation overseas during the early 1970s aided by sympathetic workers on-site. Most IRA training camps were located in the republic, as did safe houses and arms factories. The vast majority of the finances used in the IRA campaign came from criminal and legitimate activities in the Republic of Ireland rather than overseas sources. Large numbers of improvised explosive devices and firearms were manufactured by IRA members and supporters in Southern Ireland and then transported into Northern Ireland and England for use against targets in these regions. For example, one IRA arms factory near Stannaway Road, Dublin, was producing six firearms a day in 1973. An arms factory in the County Dublin village of Donabate in 1975 was described as "a centre for the manufacture of grenades, rockets and mortars." Gelignite stolen from quarries, farms and construction sites in the Republic was behind the 48,000lbs of explosives detonated in Northern Ireland in the first six months of 1973 alone. IRA training ranged from basic small arms and explosives manufacturing to heavy machine guns, overseen by Southern Irish citizens, including a former member of the Irish Defence Forces. Thousands of Irish citizens in the Republic joined the IRA throughout the conflict; for example, the assassination of Louis Mountbatten in August 1979 was carried out by IRA member Thomas McMahon from Monaghan.

In 1985, the Irish government was part of the Anglo-Irish Agreement, in which the British government recognised that the Irish government had a role to play in a future peace settlement in the North. In 1994, the Irish government was heavily involved in negotiations which brought about an IRA ceasefire.

In 1998, the Irish authorities were again party to a settlement, the Good Friday Agreement, which set up power-sharing institutions within Northern Ireland, north–south instructions and links between the various components of the United Kingdom and the Republic of Ireland. The Irish state also changed Articles 2 and 3 of the constitution to acknowledge both the existence of Northern Ireland and the desire of Irish nationalists for a united Ireland. Even in the wake of the post-Good Friday Agreement incorporation of the Provisional IRA and Sinn Féin into electoral politics, there remain several republican paramilitary groups who wish to use force to destabilise Northern Ireland – such as the Real IRA and the Continuity IRA. Irish security forces continue to be used to try to prevent attacks by such groups.

== 1949 – Declaring a republic ==
On 18 April 1949, The Republic of Ireland Act 1948 came into force. That legislation described Ireland as the Republic of Ireland but did not change the name of the state. The international and diplomatic functions previously vested in or exercised by the king were now vested in the President of Ireland who finally became unambiguously the Irish head of state. Under the Commonwealth rules then in force, the declaration of a republic automatically terminated the state's membership of the British Commonwealth. Unlike India, which became a republic shortly afterwards, Ireland chose not to reapply for admittance to the Commonwealth. In 1949 the IRA Army Council issued a statement which outlined its position on the declaration of the Republic:

"...the Irish Republic, proclaimed in arms Easter 1916 and ratified in 1919 by the elected representatives of the people of all Ireland was prevented from functioning, and in its stead two Partition Parliaments were set up to govern Ireland. Thus, Ireland was forcibly partitioned by England and has remained partitioned since. England still retains direct control over six counties of Irish territory, and maintains within that area an army of occupation. While any sod of Irish territory remains occupied by the army of a foreign country, it cannot be truthfully stated that the Republic of Ireland has been restored..."

Though a republic since 1949, the Crown of Ireland Act 1542 that had established the Kingdom of Ireland was not finally repealed until 1962, along with many other obsolete Parliament of Ireland statutes. However, long before that, the British Government in its Ireland Act 1949 recognised that "the Republic of Ireland had ceased to be part of His Majesty's dominions" (but would not be "a foreign country" for the purposes of any law).

The state joined the United Nations in December 1955, after a lengthy veto by the Soviet Union. Turned away by the veto of France in 1961, the state finally succeeded in joining the European Communities (now known as the European Union) in 1973.

== Current history ==
=== Economic, political and social history, 1945–1998 ===
Ireland emerged from the Second World War in better condition than many European countries, having been spared direct involvement in the war and with an income per capita higher than that of most belligerent countries. Ireland also benefited from a loan under the Marshal Plan; $36 million, at 2% interest. The money was spent on an extensive housing and slum-clearing project and a successful campaign to eradicate tuberculosis.

However, whereas most European countries experienced a sustained economic boom in the 1950s, Ireland did not, its economy growing by only 1% a year during the decade. Ireland as a result experienced sharp emigration of around 50,000 per year during the decade and the population of the state fell to an all-time low of 2.81 million. The policies of protectionism and low public spending which had predominated since the 1930s were widely viewed to be failing.

Fianna Fáil's political dominance was broken in 1948–51 and in 1954–1957, when coalitions led by Fine Gael (descendants of Cumann na nGaedheal), and including the Labour Party and Clann na Poblachta won elections and formed the government. However, the periods of coalition rule did little to radically alter government policies. An initiative by Noël Browne, the Minister for Health, to introduce the Mother and Child Scheme, providing free medical care to mothers and children, came to nothing when opposed by the Catholic Church and by private medical practitioners.

Poor economic growth and lack of social services led Seán Lemass, who succeeded the veteran Éamon de Valera as leader of Fianna Fáil and as Taoiseach in 1958, to state that if economic performance did not improve, the very future of the independent Irish state was at risk. "[Something] has got to be done now... If we fail everything else goes with it and all the hopes of the past will have been falsified".

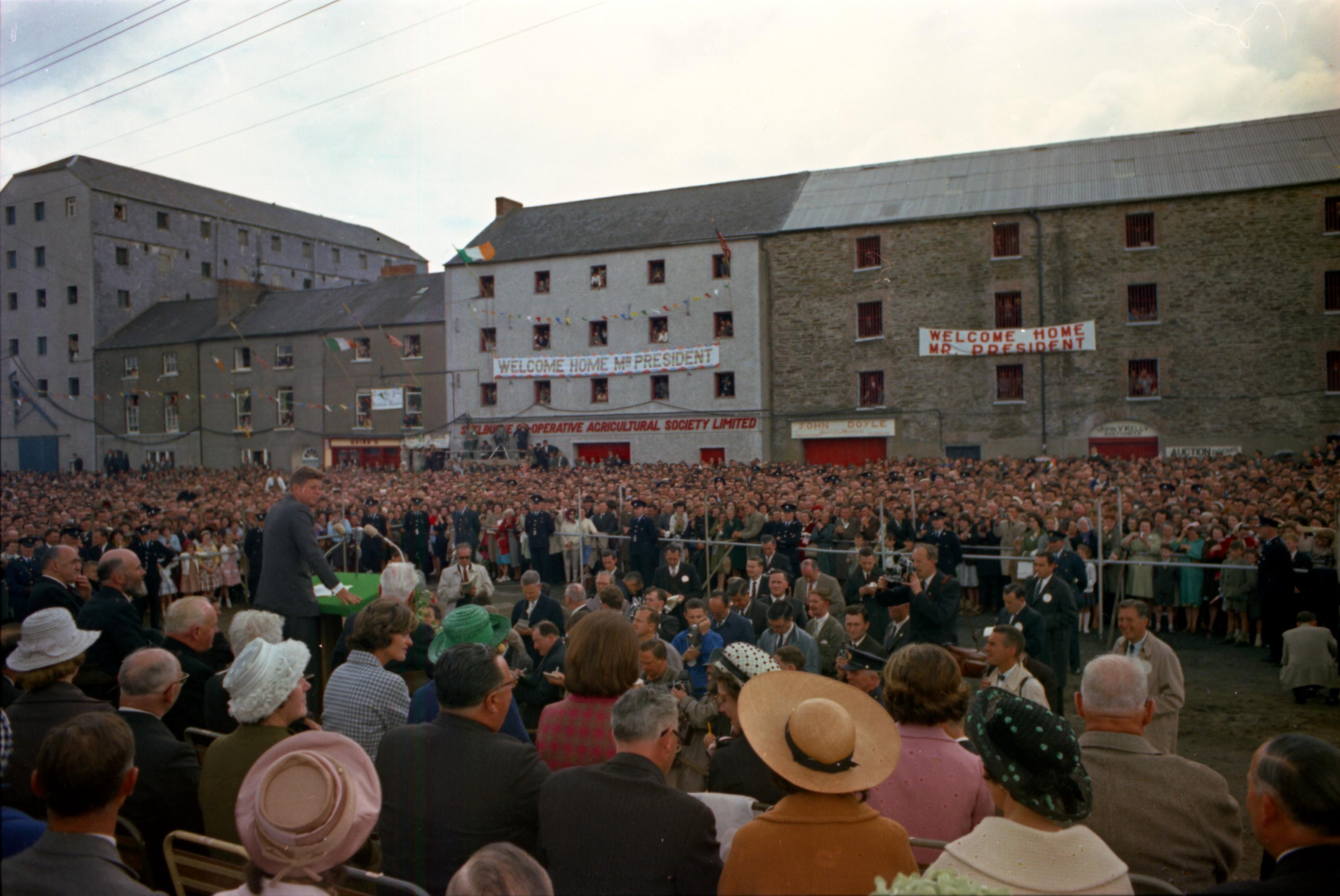
U.S. president John F. Kennedy addresses the people of New Ross, 27 June 1963

Lemass, along with T. K. Whitaker as Secretary of the Department of Finance, set specific plans for economic growth, including planned investment in industrial infrastructure and dropping of many protective tariffs and giving tax incentives to foreign manufacturing companies to set up in Ireland. Attracting foreign direct investment has remained a central part of Irish economic planning since that time. The economic plans of the Lemass era yielded economic growth of 4% a year between 1959 and 1973. A result of having more public revenue was more investment in social infrastructure – free secondary education, for instance, was instituted in 1968, by the Minister for Education, Donough O'Malley. Emigration fell as living standards in Ireland went up by 50% and began to catch up with the European average. This was demonstrated by a steady growth in the percentage of households owning various consumer goods. In 1976, for example, 56.7% of households had a car, 60% a gas cooker, 92% a radio, 36% a record player, and 74% a TV, and 39% a tape recorder, while in 1977 64% of households had a washing machine, 87% a transistor radio, and 61% a refrigerator.

The period of economic crisis of the late 1970s provoked a new economic crisis in Ireland that would endure throughout the 1980s. Fianna Fáil, back in power after the 1977 election, tried to reactivate the economy by increasing public spending, which by 1981 amounted to 65% of Irish GNP. Irish national debt in 1980 was £7 billion or 81% of GNP. By 1986, it was over £23 billion – 142% of Irish GNP.

This massive public debt hindered Irish economic performance throughout the 1980s. The governments of Charles Haughey (Fianna Fáil) and Garret FitzGerald (Fine Gael/Labour) borrowed even more, and income tax rates went up to between 35% and 60% of wage earners' income. The combination of high taxes and high unemployment caused emigration to pick up again, with up to 40,000 leaving the country each year in that decade. Power alternated between the Fianna Fáil and Fine Gael, with some governments not even lasting a year, and in one case, three elections in a period of 18 months.

Starting in 1989 there were significant policy changes with economic reform, tax cuts, welfare reform, an increase in competition, and a ban on borrowing to fund current spending. There was also a "Social Partnership Agreement" with the trade unions, whereby unions agreed not to strike in return for gradual, negotiated pay increases. These policies was started by the 1989–1992 Fianna Fáil/Progressive Democrat government, with the support of the opposition Fine Gael, and continued by the subsequent Fianna Fáil/Labour government (1992–1994) and Fine Gael/Labour Party/Democratic Left governments (1994–1997). This was known as the Tallaght Strategy, where the opposition promised not to oppose certain necessary economic measures brought in by the government of the day.

The Irish economy returned to growth by the 1990s but unemployment remained high until the second half of that decade.

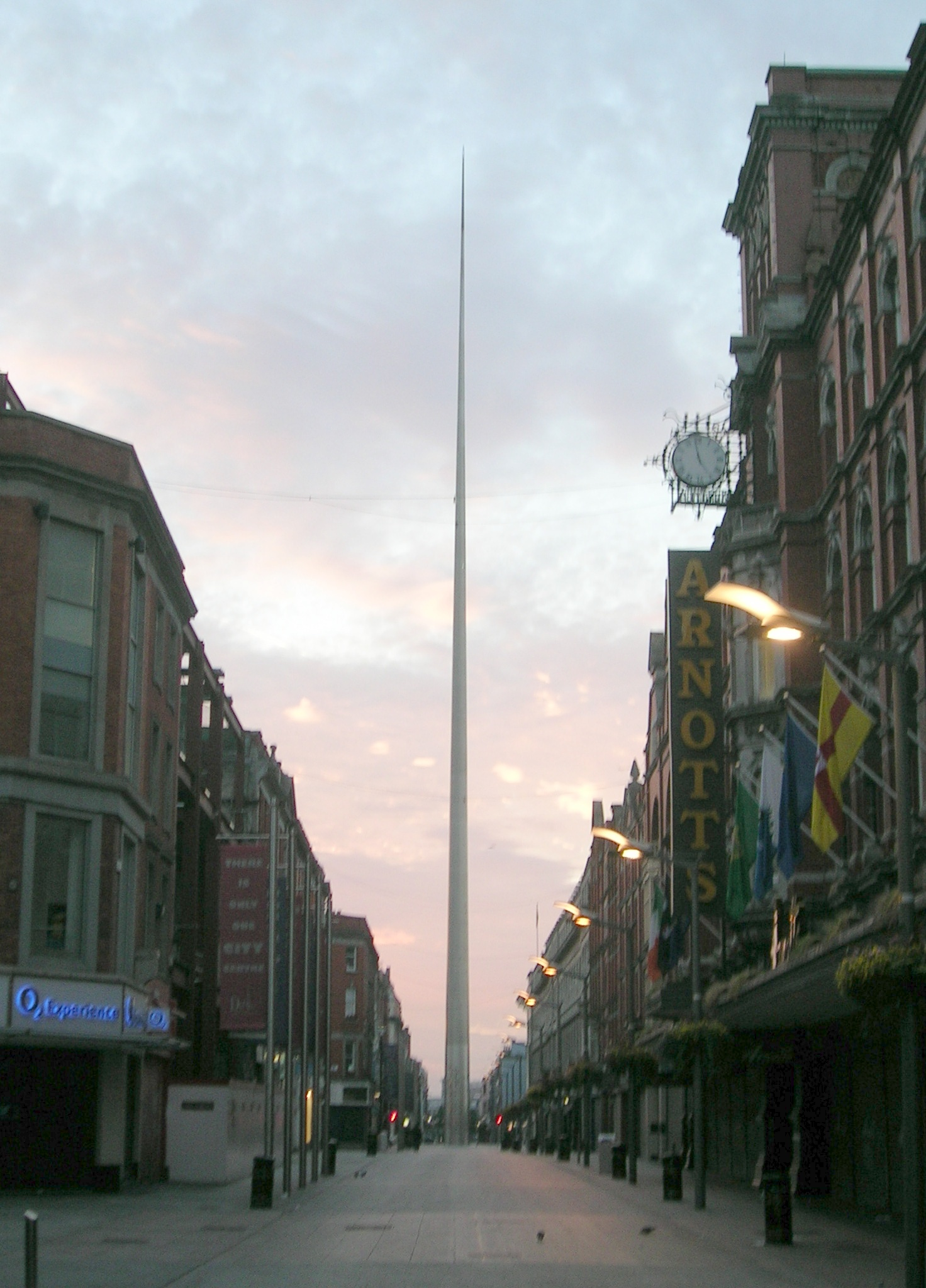
The Spire of Dublin symbolises the modernisation and growing prosperity of Ireland.

=== "Celtic Tiger;" Economic growth of 1990s ===
The state had had a disappointing economic performance for much of its existence, but it became one of the fastest growing economies in the world by the 1990s, a phenomenon known as the Celtic Tiger. One factor in this was a policy of attracting foreign investment by offering very low taxes on profits ("corporations taxes", which were set at 12%) and by investing in education – offering a well-educated work force at relatively low wages and access to the now-open European market. The second factor was getting public spending under control by a series of agreements, termed 'social partnership' with the trade unions – where gradual increases in pay were awarded in return for no industrial action. However it was not until the second half of the 1990s that figures for unemployment and emigration were reversed.

=== 21st century ===
By the beginning of the 21st century, in 2000s, Ireland had become the second richest (in terms of GDP per capita, adjusted for purchasing power parity) member of the European Union, had moved from being a net recipient of EU funds to a net contributor, and from a position of net emigration to one of net immigration. In 2005, its per capita GDP (adjusted for purchasing power parity) became the second highest in the world (behind Switzerland) with 10 percent of the population born abroad. The population grew to an all-time high for the state of about 4.5 million.

By 2001, Ireland had a substantial budget surplus and the first decade of the new millennium also saw a significant expansion of public spending on infrastructure and social services. As against this, several state-run industries were also privatised – Eircom for instance. In 2002, Irish national debt was 32% of GNP and fell further until 2007.

The Celtic Tiger started in the mid-1990s and boomed until 2001, when it slowed down, only to pick up again in 2003. It slowed again in 2007 and in June 2008 the Irish Economic and Social Research Institute (ESRI) predicted that Ireland would go into recession briefly before growth would resume.

However, since 2001, the Irish economy had been heavily dependent of the property market and when this crashed in 2008, the country's economy was badly hit.

The Irish banks had invested heavily in loans to property developers and were facing ruin as result of the property markets' collapse and also the international 'Credit crunch' or drying up of loans from abroad. Much of the Irish economy and public finances had also depended on the property market and its collapse at roughly the same time as the banking crisis impacted all parts of the Irish economy. It also meant that revenue collected by the state fell radically.

This situation was compounded by the assumption by the state of the banks' debts in 2008. The Irish government led by Brian Cowen, following a late-night meeting with all the senior banking officials in the country on 30 September 2008, agreed to cover all of the banks' debts. This debt, now estimated at over €50 billion, (over half of which will be paid to Anglo Irish Bank) imposed a heavy burden on the tax-payer and severely damaged Ireland's ability to borrow money from the International Bond markets.

The second problem is that public spending, which rose steeply in the 2000s, was now unsustainable. The total Irish budget deficit as of December 2010, stood at 93.4 billion with General Government Debt at 148.6 billion or 94.2% of GDP. As it was not clear how much money would be needed to revitalise the banks – to clear their debts and supply them with enough money to start lending again – the international markets were unwilling to lend Ireland money at an interest rate it could afford.

Under pressure from the European Union, which feared a 'run' (selling causing a collapse in value) of the euro, Ireland was forced to accept a 16-year loan of €85 billion at just under 6% interest from IMF and EU itself. Not only were the interest rates of the loan high, but the deal also involved a humiliating loss of sovereignty, in which Irish budgets had to first be approved by other parliaments of the EU – notably that of Germany.

The political result of this crisis was the fall of the Cowen government and a shattering defeat for Fianna Fáil in the 2011 Irish general election, in which the party won just 17% of the vote and retained only 20 out of its 71 seats in the Dáil. Emigration from Ireland has again picked up and many remain anxious about the economic future. Leader of Fine Gael, Enda Kenny, became the new Prime Minister after the election to succeed Brian Cowen.

In the 2016 Irish general election, Fine Gael remained the largest party in parliament, but lost seats. After the resignation of Enda Kenny, Leo Varadkar became the new Prime Minister and leader of Fine Gael, in June 2017. The background of Varadkar, as the gay son of an Indian immigrant, made this choice historical.

In early 2020, the general election was an unprecedented three-way race, with the three largest parties each winning a share of the vote between 20% and 25%. Fianna Fáil finished with 38 seats (including the Ceann Comhairle). Sinn Féin made significant gains; it received the most first-preference votes, and won 37 seats, the party's best result since its modern iteration in 1970. Fine Gael, the governing party led by Taoiseach Leo Varadkar, finished third both in seats (35) and in first-preference votes.

International news outlets described the result as a historic break from the two-party system, as it was the first time in almost a century that neither Fianna Fáil nor Fine Gael won the most votes. Furthermore, the combined vote share of the two traditional main parties fell to a historic low. The leaders of those parties had long ruled out forming a coalition government with Sinn Féin.

In June 2020, leader of Fianna Fáil, Micheál Martin, became the new Irish prime minister (taoiseach). He formed a historical three-party coalition consisting of Fianna Fáil, Fine Gael and the Green Party. It was the first time in history that Fianna Fáil and Fine Gael were in the same government. The previous prime minister and leader of Fine Gael, Leo Varadkar, became the deputy prime minister (tánaiste). Martin was scheduled to lead the country as Prime Minister until December 2022, before changing posts with Varadkar.

In December 2022, Varadkar returned as Taoiseach and Martin took the deputy role as Tánaiste. In the coalition agreement, they had officially agreed to share the role of Taoiseach. In April 2024, Varadkar was replaced as Irish prime minister by the new leader of the Fine Gael, Simon Harris.

Leprechaun economics is a coined by economist Paul Krugman to describe the 26.3 per cent rise in Irish 2015 GDP, later revised to 24.6 per cent, (Note: Though commonly asserted, it is incorrect to suggest the upward revision was to 34%; this confuses value and volume measures of Ireland's GDP growth in 2015. In July 2016, 2015 GDP growth was estimated at +26.3% volume and +32.4% value, as shown in National Income and Expenditure 2015; https://www.cso.ie/en/releasesandpublications/er/nie/nationalincomeandexpenditureannualresults2015/. The latest estimates in the Annual National Accounts 2024 show +24.6% volume and +35.7% value; https://data.cso.ie/table/NA007.) in a 12 July 2016 publication by the Irish Central Statistics Office (CSO), restating 2015 Irish national accounts. At that point, the distortion of Irish economic data by tax-driven accounting flows reached a climax. In 2020, Krugman said the term was a feature of all tax havens. The "Leprechaun economics" incident had follow-on effects. In September 2016, Ireland became the first of the major tax havens to be "blacklisted" by a G20 economy, Brazil. In February 2017, Ireland replaced GDP with "Modified GNI (or GNI*)" (2017 Irish GDP was 162% of 2017 Irish GNI*, whereas EU–28 2017 GDP was 100% of GNI). In December 2017, the U.S. and the EU introduced countermeasures to the Irish BEPS tools. In October 2018, Ireland introduced a reverse tax, to discourage IP from leaving Ireland. In 2018, the OECD showed that Ireland's public debt metrics differ dramatically depending on whether Debt-to-GDP, Debt-to-GNI* or Debt-per-Capita is used; and in 2019, the IMF estimated 60 per cent of Irish foreign direct investment was "phantom".

Despite having high GDP statistics, Ireland doesn't provide universal healthcare, which means that citizens must pay for their medical care, and the costs of medications and treatments are rising. There is assistance available for those who need it, but the country lacks a National Health Service like the one in the UK. On top of that, public transport options are said to be poor by experts, with most people relying on cars, as only Dublin has a functional public transport system.

== Social liberalisation ==
In the late 20th century, Irish society underwent rapid social change. After the introduction of free education in the late 1960s, many more people had access to second and third level qualifications. The relative economic success of the 1960s and 1970s also decreased emigration, meaning that Ireland became a younger and much more urban society than before. The spread of television and other mass media also exposed Irish citizens to a far wider range of influences than previously. All of these factors loosened the power of the traditional political parties and the Catholic Church over society.

According to one source, social liberalisation may have coincided with the economic liberalisation of the Celtic Tiger period, which saw large inflows of foreign direct investment. Writing for the Hungarian conservative think thank, the Danube Institute, Philip Pilkington writes that "every metric of social integration and health has deteriorated drastically in the period since Ireland became wealthy. Some of these trends started before Ireland became a wealthy country, but they accelerated dramatically as economic growth took off. These trends suggest a likely link between cultural change and economic growth".

By the 1980s, some were calling for liberalisation of the state's laws, particularly a review of the bans on divorce, contraception, and homosexuality. However, they were also opposed by well-organised groups who accused the reformers of being irreligious and "anti-family". That decade saw bitter disagreement between socially conservative, principally religious, elements and liberals over a series of referendums.

In 1983, the Pro-Life Amendment Campaign campaigned for and won a referendum, explicitly including a ban on abortion into the constitution – the Eighth Amendment of the Constitution of Ireland.

The liberals had a victory in 1985, when it was made legal to buy condoms and spermicides without prescription. Nevertheless, it was not until 1993 that all restrictions on information and sale of contraceptives were abolished. In 1986, the Fine Gael/Labour coalition proposed to remove the ban on divorce. This was opposed by Fianna Fáil and the Catholic Church and the Tenth Amendment of the Constitution Bill 1986 was defeated in a referendum.

Since 1992, the state has become less socially conservative. Liberalisation has been championed by figures like Mary Robinson, a radical feminist senator who became President of Ireland, and David Norris, who led the Campaign for Homosexual Law Reform. Homosexual sex was decriminalised by an act of parliament in 1993.

The constitutional ban on abortion was softened somewhat in 1992. After a referendum in that year, the Twelfth Amendment of the Constitution Bill 1992 was approved, it was made legal to perform an abortion to save the life of a mother, to give information about abortion and to travel to another country for an abortion.

In 1995, after a referendum, the Fifteenth Amendment of the Constitution of Ireland legalised divorce.

In the 1980s and early 1990s, these questions were deeply divisive in the Republic of Ireland and exposed deep social cleavages between religious and secular-minded people, urban and rural, middle and working classes. Issues such as divorce, contraception and homosexuality have since become accepted by many and have ceased to be matters of serious political debate. However, legalising abortion remained controversial. Opinion poll evidence on the subject of abortion was mixed.

In 2015, Ireland became the first country in the world to legalise same-sex marriage by means of popular referendum, when the Thirty-fourth Amendment of the Constitution of Ireland was passed by just over 60% of voters.

In 2018, a referendum repealing the ban on abortion was passed, the Thirty-sixth Amendment of the Constitution of Ireland. Legislation to allow elective abortion care up to 12 weeks and under restrictions after that time was enacted in the form of the Health (Regulation of Termination of Pregnancy) Act 2018. Abortion services began on 1 January 2019.

== National scandals ==
Social liberalisation was widely accepted by the 1990s due in part to a series of a very damaging scandals in that decade. The revelation that one senior Catholic bishop, Eamon Casey, fathered a child by a divorcée caused a major reaction, as did the discovery of a child abuse ring whereby offenders became clerics in order to use their position in the Roman Catholic Church to obtain access to victims—notably the infamous paedophile Father Brendan Smyth. Some other bishops, including John Magee and Brendan Comiskey, subsequently resigned between 2002 and 2010 over their mishandling of child abuse cases in their dioceses. It was also revealed, in the 2000s, after an inquiry, the Ryan Commission, that there had been widespread physical and sexual abuse of children in secular and Church-run industrial schools and orphanages from the 1920s until the 1960s. These were institutions which were set up to house children without families or with very poor parents. In some cases, it was claimed, these children had been removed from their parents only to be put into institutions worse than their previous state.

While other factors also played a role, the scandals in the Catholic Church contributed to a steep decline in church attendance among Irish Catholics. While in 1991, 92% of the Republic's population identified themselves as Roman Catholics, by 2006 this had dropped to 86%. More starkly, whereas in 1990, 85% of Catholics attended mass weekly, by 2008 this had fallen to 43% among Catholics and 40% of the population in general. (See also Catholic sexual abuse scandal in Ireland)

In the 1990s, a series of tribunals began inquiring into major allegations of corruption against senior politicians. Ray Burke, who served as Minister for Foreign Affairs in 1997 was sentenced to six months in prison following his conviction on charges of tax evasion in January 2005. The Beef Tribunal in the early 1990s found that major food companies, notably in Iraq had been given preferential treatment by the Fianna Fáil government in return for donations to that party. Former Taoisigh Charles Haughey and Bertie Ahern were also brought before Tribunals to explain their acceptance of very large personal donations of money to them by private businessmen.

== See also ==
- History of Ireland
- Timeline of Irish history
- 2020s in Irish history
