= Executive Authority (External Relations) Act 1936 =

Act of the Irish parliament

The Executive Authority (External Relations) Act 1936 (No. 58 of 1936) was an Act of the Oireachtas (Irish parliament). The Act, which was signed into law on 12 December 1936, was one of two passed hurriedly in the aftermath of the Edward VIII abdication crisis to sharply reduce the role of the Crown. It is also sometimes referred to as the External Relations Act.

== Background and provisions of the Act ==
Under the Constitution of the Irish Free State as originally enacted, the executive authority of the Irish Free State was declared to be vested in the king and declared to be exercisable by the governor-general as representative of the Crown. But the 1932 Irish general election was won by Fianna Fáil, led by Éamon de Valera and other republicans who had opposed the monarchial elements in the constitution, and part of their programme aimed to reduce the role and visibility of the monarch in Irish political life.

In the aftermath of King Edward VIII's signing of an Instrument of Abdication on 10 December 1936, the Oireachtas of the Irish Free State enacted the Constitution (Amendment No. 27) Act 1936 abolishing the office of the governor-general so that thereafter the powers of the Executive Council of the Irish Free State, insofar as internal matters were concerned, ceased to be exercised in the name of the king. While the Crown was thus abolished for the purposes of internal government, article 51 of the amendment allowed the Executive Council to, for the purposes of foreign relations, make use of "any organ used as a constitutional organ for the like purposes by [other nations of the Commonwealth]".

The Executive Authority (External Relations) Act 1936 was enacted the following day to implement that provision. It provided that the diplomatic and consular representatives of the Irish Free State in other countries should be appointed, and that the Irish Free State's international agreements should be concluded, by the king acting on the advice of the Executive Council (as. 1–2). Thus the Act preserved the Crown to a limited extent in the sphere of external relations.

More particularly, the Act stipulated (s. 3(1)) that:

so long as Saorstát Éireann ([i.e. the Irish Free State) is associated with the following nations, that is to say, Australia, Canada, Great Britain, New Zealand and South Africa [i.e. the dominions then within the Commonwealth], and so long as the King recognised by those nations as the symbol of their co-operation continues to act on behalf of each of those nations (on the advice of the several Governments thereof) for the purposes of the appointment of diplomatic and consular representatives and the conclusion of international agreements, the King so recognised may, and is hereby authorised to, act on behalf of Saorstát Éireann for the like purposes as and when advised by the Executive Council so to do.

It was in that manner specifically provided that so long as the Irish Free State was associated with the members of the British Commonwealth and so long as the members of the Commonwealth continue to recognise the king as the symbol of their special relationship and the king acts on their behalf in the sphere of external affairs, the king shall continue to act in the external relations of the Irish Free State. The meaning of this provision was a matter of considerable uncertainty.

The act also brought King Edward VIII's Instrument of Abdication into effect for the purposes of Irish law (s. 3(2)).

== Executive Powers (Consequential Provisions) Act 1937 ==
The speed with which the 1936 act was passed also meant that some serious legal matters had been overlooked by the draughtsmen, touching on the top of the Irish legal hierarchy. In May 1937 these were covered by the Executive Powers (Consequential Provisions) Act 1937. As the governor-generalship had not been actually abolished by the 1936 Act, this act was required to validate the otherwise-unlawful appointment of the Chief Justice of Ireland Timothy Sullivan. Sullivan had in turn questionably appointed three High Court judges. The recent appointment of Patrick Lynch as the attorney general of Ireland and even the pension of the outgoing governor-general (Domhnall Ua Buachalla) needed to be legalised.

== Repeal ==
The Executive Authority (External Relations) Act 1936 was repealed by The Republic of Ireland Act 1948, which came into force on 18 April 1949 when Ireland became an independent republic outside the Commonwealth of Nations.

The new act vested the powers formerly possessed by the king in the president of Ireland.

== See also ==
- Irish head of state from 1922 to 1949
