= Ireland Act 1949 =

Act of the Parliament of the United Kingdom

Ireland Act 1949 (Note: Section 7(1).)
- Act of Parliament
- Parliament of the United Kingdom
- Long title: An Act to recognise and declare the constitutional position as to the part of Ireland heretofore known as Eire, and to make provision as to the name by which it may be known and the manner in which the law is to apply in relation to it; to declare and affirm the constitutional position and the territorial integrity of Northern Ireland and to amend, as respects the Parliament of the United Kingdom, the law relating to the qualifications of electors in constituencies in Northern Ireland; and for purposes connected with the matters aforesaid.
- Citation: 12, 13 & 14 Geo. 6. c. 41
- Introduced by: Clement Attlee (Commons)
- Territorial extent: United Kingdom; Channel Islands; Isle of Man; (Note: Section 7(2).)

Dates
- Royal assent: 2 June 1949
- Commencement: 18 April 1949 (Note: Section 7(3).)
Other legislation
Amended by	Representation of the People Act 1949; Diplomatic Privileges Act 1964; Northern Ireland Constitution Act 1973; British Nationality Act 1981
Relates to	Republic of Ireland Act 1948

Status: Amended

Text of statute as originally enacted

Revised text of statute as amended

Text of the Ireland Act 1949 as in force today (including any amendments) within the United Kingdom, from legislation.gov.uk.

The Ireland Act 1949 (12, 13 & 14 Geo. 6. c. 41) is an act of the Parliament of the United Kingdom intended to deal with the consequences of the Republic of Ireland Act 1948 as passed by the Irish parliament, the Oireachtas.

== Background ==
Following the secession of most of Ireland from the United Kingdom in 1922, the then created Irish Free State remained (for the purposes of British law) a dominion of the British Empire and thus its people remained British subjects with the right to live and work in the United Kingdom and elsewhere in the Empire. The British monarch continued to be head of state. However, by 1936, systematic attempts to remove references to the monarch from Irish constitutional law meant that the only functions remaining to the Crown were:

- signing Letters of Credence accrediting Irish ambassadors to other states; and
- signing international treaties on Ireland's behalf.

This status quo remained, with Ireland participating little in the British Commonwealth and Éamon de Valera remarking in 1945 that "we are a republic" in reply to the question if he planned to declare Ireland as a republic. Then somewhat unexpectedly in 1948, during a visit to Canada, Taoiseach John A. Costello announced that Ireland was to be declared a republic. The subsequent Irish legislation, the Republic of Ireland Act 1948, provided for the abolition of the last remaining functions of the King in relation to Ireland and provided that the President of Ireland would exercise these functions in the King's place. When the act came into force on 18 April 1949, it effectively ended Ireland's status as a British dominion. As a consequence of this, it also had the effect of ending Ireland's membership in the British Commonwealth of Nations and the existing basis upon which Ireland and its citizens were treated in the United Kingdom and other Commonwealth countries as "British subjects", not foreigners.

== Summary of provisions ==
The act's long title summarises the act's several purposes:

An Act to recognise and declare the constitutional position as to the part of Ireland heretofore known as Eire, and to make provision as to the name by which it may be known and the manner in which the law is to apply in relation to it; to declare and affirm the constitutional position and the territorial integrity of Northern Ireland and to amend, as respects the Parliament of the United Kingdom, the law relating to the qualifications of electors in constituencies in Northern Ireland; and for purposes connected with the matters aforesaid.

The effects of the act's various subsections are as follows:

- s. 1(1) – Declared that the country known in British law as "Éire" ceased to be "part of His Majesty's dominions" (i.e., a member of the Commonwealth) on 18 April 1949 (the date that the Irish Republic of Ireland Act 1948 came into force). The reasons for including this declaration were described in the Working Party Report of the British Cabinet, which noted that "as a matter of law, it [was] arguable, on the terms of the [Statute of Westminster], that some provision by the Parliament at Westminster is required in order to complete the process by which a country ceases to be a member of the Commonwealth." The report remarked that there was hope that the inclusion of the declaration would "forestall any such legal argument" and offer the "additional advantage of excluding, for all purposes of United Kingdom law, any future argument that Eire [sic] ceased to be a member of the Commonwealth, not merely from the date of commencement of the Republic of Ireland Act, but from the entry into force of the new Eire Constitution of 1937."
- s. 1(2) – Declared that all of Northern Ireland would continue as part of the United Kingdom, and would remain within the Commonwealth, unless the Parliament of Northern Ireland consented otherwise. The working party report noted around this that "it [had] become a matter of first-class strategic importance ... that the North should continue to form part of His Majesty's dominions". The report continued that it indeed seemed "unlikely that Great Britain would ever be able to agree to [Northern Ireland secession] even if the people of Northern Ireland desired it."
- s. 1(3) – Established that the country up to then known in British law as "Eire" will in future be referred to by subsequent British legislation by the name "Republic of Ireland".
- s. 2(1) – Declared that, even though the Republic of Ireland was no longer a British dominion, it would not be treated as a foreign country for the purposes of British law.
- s. 2(2) – Established that the Irish ambassador to the United Kingdom would enjoy the same legal privileges with regard to taxation as the High Commissioners representing Commonwealth countries.
- s. 3(1) – Continued in force certain existing British laws in relation to the Republic of Ireland that had previously related to the Irish state.
- s. 3(2) – Made blanket provision for how certain wording in existing British legislation should be construed; for example, references to "His Majesty's dominions" were to be construed as including a reference to the Republic of Ireland despite its actual change of status.
- s. 3(3) – Excluded from the generality of the preceding subsection any requirement for the Oireachtas to assent to any change in the law relating to the succession to the throne or the royal style and titles; and also ended the requirement for the Irish government to receive notifications under the provisions of the Regency Act 1937.
- ss. 4 and 5 – Made certain technical provisions in relation to both transitional matters and to the citizenship of certain individuals born before the Irish Free State ceased to form part of the United Kingdom of Great Britain and Ireland; fixing a mistake in the British Nationality Act 1948 (see below).
- s. 6 – Made a number of technical changes to the electoral law relating to the election of MPs to sit at Westminster for Northern Ireland. The principal change required a voter to have lived in Northern Ireland for at least three months prior to the registration date; this change was introduced because the Government of Northern Ireland did not want people from the Republic coming to Northern Ireland to vote in elections there.

== Repairing mistake in British nationality law ==
The Ireland Act was also used by the United Kingdom to "repair an omission in the British Nationality Act, 1948". The British Nationality Act included provisions dealing specifically with the position of "a person who was a British subject and a citizen of Eire on 31st December, 1948". Because of this, how the British law would apply was dependent on a question of Irish law, namely, who was a "citizen of Eire"? The UK Government seriously misunderstood the position under Irish law. The UK Secretary of State for Home Affairs explained that:

[w]hen British Nationality Act was passed the United Kingdom did not know that a person who was born in Southern Ireland of a Southern Irish father and on 6th December, 1922, was domiciled in Northern Ireland was regarded as a citizen of Eire under Eire law. They therefore considered that such a person became a United Kingdom citizen on 1st January, 1949 [in accordance with the British Nationality Act].

The impact of this was that many people in Northern Ireland were in theory deprived of a British citizenship status they would otherwise have enjoyed but for Irish law. This was an unintended consequence of the British Nationality Act.

The Secretary of State also explained the background to the mistake. He reported that under Irish law the question of who was a "citizen of Eire" was in part, dependent on whether a person was "domiciled in the Irish Free State on 6th December, 1922". In this regard he noted:

The important date to bear in mind there is 6th December, 1922, for that was the date...the Irish Free State was constituted, and as constituted on 6th December, 1922, it consisted of the 32 counties with the six counties which now form Northern Ireland having the right to vote themselves out. They did so vote themselves out on 7th December, but on 6th December, 1922, the whole of Ireland, the 32 counties, was the Irish Free State and it was not until 7th December, the next day, the six counties having voted themselves out, that the Irish Free State became confined to the 26 counties. Therefore, the Eire law, by inserting the date 6th December, 1922, and attaching to that the domicile, meant that anybody domiciled inside the island of Ireland on 6th December, 1922, was a citizen of Eire.

The amendment made to the British Nationality Act under the Ireland Act was intended to make it clear, in summary, that regardless of the position under Irish law, the affected persons domiciled in Northern Ireland on 6 December 1922 would not be deprived of a British citizenship status they would otherwise have enjoyed but for Irish law.

In view of the above, the amendment made to the British Nationality Act under section 5 of the 1949 Act conferred Citizenship of the UK and Colonies (CUKC) on any Irish-born person meeting all the following criteria:

1. was born before 6 December 1922 in what became the Republic of Ireland;
2. was domiciled outside the Republic of Ireland on 6 December 1922;
3. was ordinarily resident outside the Republic of Ireland from 1935 to 1948; and
4. was not registered as an Irish citizen under Irish legislation.

=== Practical effect for descendants ===
Under section 5 of the act, a person who was born in the territory of the future Republic of Ireland as a British subject, but who did not receive Irish citizenship under the act's interpretation of either the 1922 Irish constitution or the 1935 Irish Nationality and Citizenship Act (because he or she was no longer domiciled in the Republic on the day the constitution came into force and was not permanently resident there on the day of the 1935 law's enactment and was not otherwise registered as an Irish citizen) was deemed to be a Citizen of the United Kingdom and Colonies.

As such, many of those individuals and some of the descendants in the Irish diaspora of an Irish person who left Ireland before 1922 (and who was also not resident in 1935) may both be registrable for Irish citizenship and be a British citizen, through either:

- birth to the first generation emigrant,
- registration of later generation births by the married citizen father at the local British consulate within one year of birth, prior to the British Nationality Act (BNA) 1981 taking effect,
- by registration, at any time in life, with Form UKF, of birth to an unwed citizen father, or
- by registration, at any time in life, with Form UKM, of birth to a citizen mother between the BNA 1948 and the BNA 1981 effective dates, under the UK Supreme Court's 2018 Romein principle.

In some cases, British citizenship may be available to these descendants in the Irish diaspora when Irish citizenship registration is not, as in instances of failure of past generations to register in timely manner in a local Irish consulate's Foreign Births Register before the 1986 changes to Irish nationality law and before births of later generations.

== Northern Ireland's name ==
The act made no change to Northern Ireland's name. However, earlier drafts of the Bill had included a provision changing Northern Ireland's name to "Ulster".

== Reaction ==
The act created outrage in Ireland because its provisions guaranteed that partition (i.e. the status of Northern Ireland as a part of the UK) would continue unless the Parliament of Northern Ireland chose otherwise. Because Northern Ireland had a unionist majority, the guarantee that Northern Ireland would remain part of the UK unless the Belfast parliament resolved otherwise copper-fastened the so-called "unionist veto" in British law. The Irish parliament called for a Protest Against Partition as a result. This was the first and last cross-party declaration against partition by the Irish parliament. The revival of an Irish Republican Army in the early 1950s has been attributed by Irish journalist and popular historian Tim Pat Coogan to the strength of popular feeling among nationalists on both sides of the border against the act.

Before the final act was published, speculation that the legislation would change the name of "Northern Ireland" to "Ulster" was also the subject of adverse reaction from Irish nationalist politicians in Northern Ireland and from the Minister for Foreign Affairs in Ireland, as only six of the nine counties of Ulster are actually in Northern Ireland.
