= The Republic of Ireland Act 1948 =

Law establishing the Republic of Ireland and severing political ties to the UK

Oireachtas
- Long title: An Act to repeal the Executive Authority (External Relations) Act, 1936, to declare that the description of the State shall be the Republic of Ireland, and to enable the President to exercise the executive power or any executive function of the state in or in connection with its external relations.
- Citation: Act No. 22 of 1948
- Territorial extent: Ireland
- Passed by: Dáil Éireann
- Passed: 2 December 1948
- Passed by: Seanad Éireann
- Passed: 15 December 1948
- Signed by: Seán T. O'Kelly (President of Ireland)
- Signed: 21 December 1948
- Commenced: 18 April 1949

Legislative history

Initiating chamber: Dáil Éireann
- Bill citation: Bill No. 19 of 1948
- Introduced by: John A. Costello (Taoiseach)
- Introduced: 17 November 1948
- First reading: 17 November 1948
- Second reading: 24 November 1948

Revising chamber: Seanad Éireann
- Second reading: 10 December 1948

Repeals
- Executive Authority (External Relations) Act 1936

Related legislation
- Ireland Act 1949 [UK]

Keywords
- Republicanism, Head of state, Diplomatic credentials, Commonwealth membership criteria
- Status: Current legislation

The Republic of Ireland Act 1948 (Note: The word "The" is included and capitalised in the short title.) (No. 22 of 1948) is an Act of the Oireachtas which declares that the description of Ireland is the Republic of Ireland, and vests in the president of Ireland the power to exercise the executive authority of the state in its external relations, on the advice of the Government of Ireland. The Act was signed into law on 21 December 1948 and came into force on 18 April 1949, Easter Monday, the 33rd anniversary of the beginning of the Easter Rising.

The Act ended the remaining statutory role of the British monarchy in relation to Ireland, by repealing the 1936 External Relations Act, which had vested in George VI, in his capacity as a symbol of the cooperation of the nations that were members of the Commonwealth with which Ireland associated itself, and his successors those functions which the Act now transferred to the President.

The Act did not change the official name of the state which continued to be Éire (in Irish) and 'Ireland' (in English), as prescribed in Article 4 of the Constitution of Ireland.

== Text of the Act ==
The Republic of Ireland Act consists of five brief sections, set out in full as follows:

Number 22 of 1948
The Republic of Ireland Act, 1948
An Act to repeal the Executive Authority (External Relations) Act, 1936, to declare that the description of the State shall be the Republic of Ireland, and to enable the President to exercise the executive power or any executive function of the state in or in connection with its external relations. (21 December 1948)

Be it enacted by the Oireachtas as follows:—

- 1.—The Executive Authority (External Relations) Act, 1936 (No. 58 of 1936), is hereby repealed.
- 2.—It is hereby declared that the description of the State shall be the Republic of Ireland.
- 3.—The President, on the authority and on the advice of the Government, may exercise the executive power or any executive function of the State in or in connection with its external relations.
- 4.—This Act shall come into operation on such day as the Government may by order appoint.
- 5.—This Act may be cited as The Republic of Ireland Act, 1948.

=== British monarch ===
Section 1 of the Act repealed the Executive Authority (External Relations) Act 1936. By doing so the Act abolished the last remaining functions of the British monarch (then King George VI) in relation to the Irish state. These functions had related to the issuance and acceptance of letters of credence of diplomatic and consular representatives and the conclusion of international agreements. Section 3 provides that the President of Ireland may instead exercise these functions and any other functions in relation to the state's external (or foreign) relations.

=== The Commonwealth ===
At the time the Act came into force, John A. Costello, the Taoiseach whose government introduced the Act, believed that Ireland did not have a King and had not been a member of the Commonwealth of Nations since 1936. His government's view was that Ireland was already a republic and that the Act would not create a republic but rather achieve a "clarification of [Ireland's] constitutional status". These views were shared by the Irish opposition leader of the time, Éamon de Valera. Indeed, Irish leaders had on several previous occasions declared that Ireland was a republic and not a Commonwealth member, but that it was associated with the Commonwealth.

The Irish view of things was not shared by the other members of the Commonwealth. Until Ireland brought the Act into force, it was still regarded by the members as forming part of "His Majesty's dominions". When Ireland adopted its 1937 Constitution, which made no reference to the King, the United Kingdom Government announced that it and the other Commonwealth Governments were "[still] prepared to treat ... Ireland, as a member of the British Commonwealth of Nations". After all, in their view, the King was still empowered by Ireland to fulfill certain functions as Ireland's statutory agent under the External Relations Act 1936. With that Irish Act now being repealed, there was no longer any basis, however tenuous, to consider Ireland as continuing to have a King or to be part of His Majesty's dominions and therefore within the Commonwealth. In their view, Ireland had now declared itself a republic for the first time bringing its membership of the Commonwealth to an end. Ironically, the Taoiseach chose to announce the repeal of the External Relations Act while on an official visit to Canada, the same country whose constitutional status had been the basis for the establishment of the Irish Free State.

The London Declaration, which permitted republics to remain within the Commonwealth, was made shortly afterwards in response to India's desire to continue as a member once its new republican constitution was finalised. However, the Irish government did not reapply for membership of the Commonwealth. De Valera was opposed to this and considered applying for membership after his return to office in the 1950s.

=== Republic of Ireland description ===
Section 2 of the Act provides:

It is hereby declared that the description of the State shall be the Republic of Ireland.

The Act did not declare Ireland to be a republic, nor did it change the official name of the state which continued to be Éire (in Irish) and Ireland (in English) as prescribed in the Constitution. The Act provided for a description for the State. The distinction between a description and a name has sometimes caused confusion. Costello explained the difference in the following way:

If I say that my name is Costello and that my description is that of senior counsel, I think that will be clear to anybody who wants to know. If the Senator [Helena Concannon] will look at Article 4 of the Constitution she will find that the name of the State is Éire. Section 2 of this Bill declares that "this State shall be described as the Republic of Ireland". Its name in Irish is Éire and in the English language, Ireland. Its description in the English language is "the Republic of Ireland".

== Background ==
In 1945, when asked if he planned to declare a republic, the Taoiseach Éamon de Valera had replied, "we are a republic", which he had not said in the previous eight years. He also insisted that Ireland had no king, but simply used an external king as an "organ" in international affairs.

In October 1947, de Valera asked the attorney-general, Cearbhall Ó Dálaigh, to draft a bill to repeal the External Relations Act, and by 1948 a draft of the bill included a reference to the state as being a republic. In the end, the draft bill was never submitted to the Oireachtas for approval.

By the eve of the 1948 Irish general election the United Kingdom's Representative to Ireland, Lord Rugby, reported that the annulment of the External Relations Act was inevitable. He remarked "No party has left the door open to any other course". The result of the election saw a new Irish government formed under the leadership of John A. Costello.

Costello made the announcement that a bill to repeal the External Relations Act was to be introduced when he was in Ottawa, during an official visit to Canada. David McCullagh has suggested that it was a spur of the moment reaction to offence caused by the Governor General of Canada, Lord Alexander, who was of Northern Ireland descent.

Allegedly, Alexander placed loyalist symbols, notably a replica of the famous Roaring Meg cannon used in the Siege of Derry, before an affronted Costello at a state dinner. Certainly, an agreement that there would be separate toasts for the King and for the President of Ireland was broken. The Irish position was that a toast to the King, instead of representing both countries, would not include Ireland. Only a toast to the King was proposed, to the fury of the Irish delegation. Shortly afterwards Costello announced the plan to repeal the External Relations Act.

However, according to all but one of the ministers in Costello's cabinet, the decision to repeal the External Relations Act had already been made before the Canadian visit. Costello's revelation of the decision was because the Sunday Independent (an Irish newspaper) had discovered the fact and was about to "break" the story as an exclusive. Nevertheless, one minister, Noel Browne, gave a different account in his autobiography, Against the Tide. He claimed Costello's announcement was done in a fit of anger of his treatment by the Governor General and that when he returned, Costello, at an assembly of ministers in his home, offered to resign because of his manufacture of a major government policy initiative on the spot in Canada. Yet according to Browne, all the ministers agreed that they would refuse to accept the resignation and also agreed to manufacture the story of a prior cabinet decision.

The evidence of what really happened remains ambiguous. There is no record of a prior decision to repeal the External Relations Act before Costello's Canadian trip, among cabinet papers for 1948, which supports Browne's claim. However, the Costello government refused to allow the Secretary to the Government, Maurice Moynihan, to attend cabinet meetings and take minutes, because they believed he was too close to the opposition leader, Éamon de Valera. Rather than entrust the minute-taking to Moynihan, the cabinet entrusted it to a Parliamentary Secretary (junior minister), Liam Cosgrave. Given that Cosgrave had never kept minutes before, his minutes, at least early on in the government, proved to be only a limited record of government decisions. So whether the issue was never raised, was raised but undecided on, was subjected to a decision taken informally, or was subjected to a decision taken formally, remains obscure on the basis of the 1948 cabinet documentation.

== Introduction of the bill ==
The Republic of Ireland Bill was introduced in 1948 by the new Taoiseach, John A. Costello of Fine Gael.

At committee stage in the Dáil, Mick Fitzpatrick of Clann na Poblachta proposed adding a section to the bill making the date of its coming into force a public holiday to be called "Independence Day". Fianna Fáil opposed this since the bill did not affect the partition of Ireland. John A. Costello said he sympathised with Fitzpatrick but the idea was impractical since the date of coming into force was uncertain. Fitzpatrick withdrew the proposal.

The Act was enacted with all parties voting for it. De Valera did suggest that it would have been better to reserve the declaration of the republic until Irish unity had been achieved, a comment hard to reconcile with his 1945 claim that the Irish state was already a republic.

== Response ==
=== United Kingdom ===
The United Kingdom responded to the Republic of Ireland Act by enacting the Ireland Act 1949. This Act formally asserted that the Irish state had, when the Republic of Ireland Act came into force, ceased "to be part of His Majesty's dominions" and accordingly was no longer within the Commonwealth. Nonetheless, the United Kingdom statute provided that Irish citizens would not be treated as aliens under British nationality law. This, in effect, granted them a status similar to the citizens of Commonwealth countries.

Between the enactment of the Constitution of Ireland in 1937 and the enactment of the Ireland Act 1949, the United Kingdom had formally decided upon the (anglicised) "Eire" as its name for the Irish state. The 1949 Act now provided that "the part of Ireland heretofore known as Eire" could be referred to in future UK legislation as the "Republic of Ireland". The UK's continued aversion to using "Ireland" as the formal name for the state due to the fact it did not (and does not) comprise the entirety of the island of the same name remained a source of diplomatic friction for several decades afterwards.

The UK's Ireland Act also gave a legislative guarantee that Northern Ireland would continue to remain a part of the United Kingdom unless the Parliament of Northern Ireland formally expressed a wish to join a United Ireland; this "unionist veto" proved to be controversial during the Act's passage through Westminster, as well as in the Irish state and amongst Northern Ireland's nationalist community. The guarantee was replaced in 1973, when the Parliament of Northern Ireland was abolished, by a new guarantee based on "the consent of the majority of the people of Northern Ireland".

On the day the Act came into force, 18 April 1949, King George VI sent the following message to the President of Ireland, Seán T. O'Kelly:

I send you my sincere good wishes on this day, being well aware of the neighbourly links which hold the people of the Republic of Ireland in close association with my subjects of the United Kingdom. I hold in most grateful memory the services and sacrifices of the men and women of your country who rendered gallant assistance to our cause in the recent war and who made a notable contribution to our victories. I pray that every blessing may be with you today and in the future.

— GEORGE R.

=== Church of Ireland ===
The Book of Common Prayer of the all-island Church of Ireland was modelled on that of the Church of England and included three "state prayers": for "our most gracious Sovereign Lord, King George", the royal family, and the Commonwealth. The church was historically associated with the Protestant Ascendancy and had been the established church until 1871; its "southern" membership (one-third of the total) was mostly unionist before 1922 and pro-British thereafter. In late 1948, archbishops John Gregg and Arthur Barton devised replacement prayers to be used in the republic, at first temporarily until the 1949 general synod would update the Book of Common Prayer. A grassroots campaign led by Hugh Maude of Clondalkin opposed any change, and the 1950 synod authorised a compromise, whereby the old prayers remained in Northern Ireland, and the republic used a "Prayer for the President and all in authority". The synod proposed "A Prayer for King George the Sixth ... in whose dominions we are not accounted strangers" (an allusion to the Ireland Act 1949) as an optional prayer which could be used in the south. The final form of the prayer, which appears in Prayers and Thanksgivings and not in the main services, omitted this phrase as it proved to be unpopular. Likewise, the liturgy for morning and evening prayers includes "O Lord, save the Queen" in Northern Ireland and "O Lord, guide and defend our rulers" in the republic. Miriam Moffitt notes that Maude's supporters were mostly older church members.

== Reassessment ==
In 1996, the Constitution Review Group reviewed the full text of the Constitution. It considered whether the name of the state should be amended to declare that Ireland should be named "Republic of Ireland". It decided against recommending such an amendment. This was the second time that such an amendment was considered by committee, which considered every provision of the constitution.
