= Foreign Births Register =

Official register of foreign births with Irish citizenship

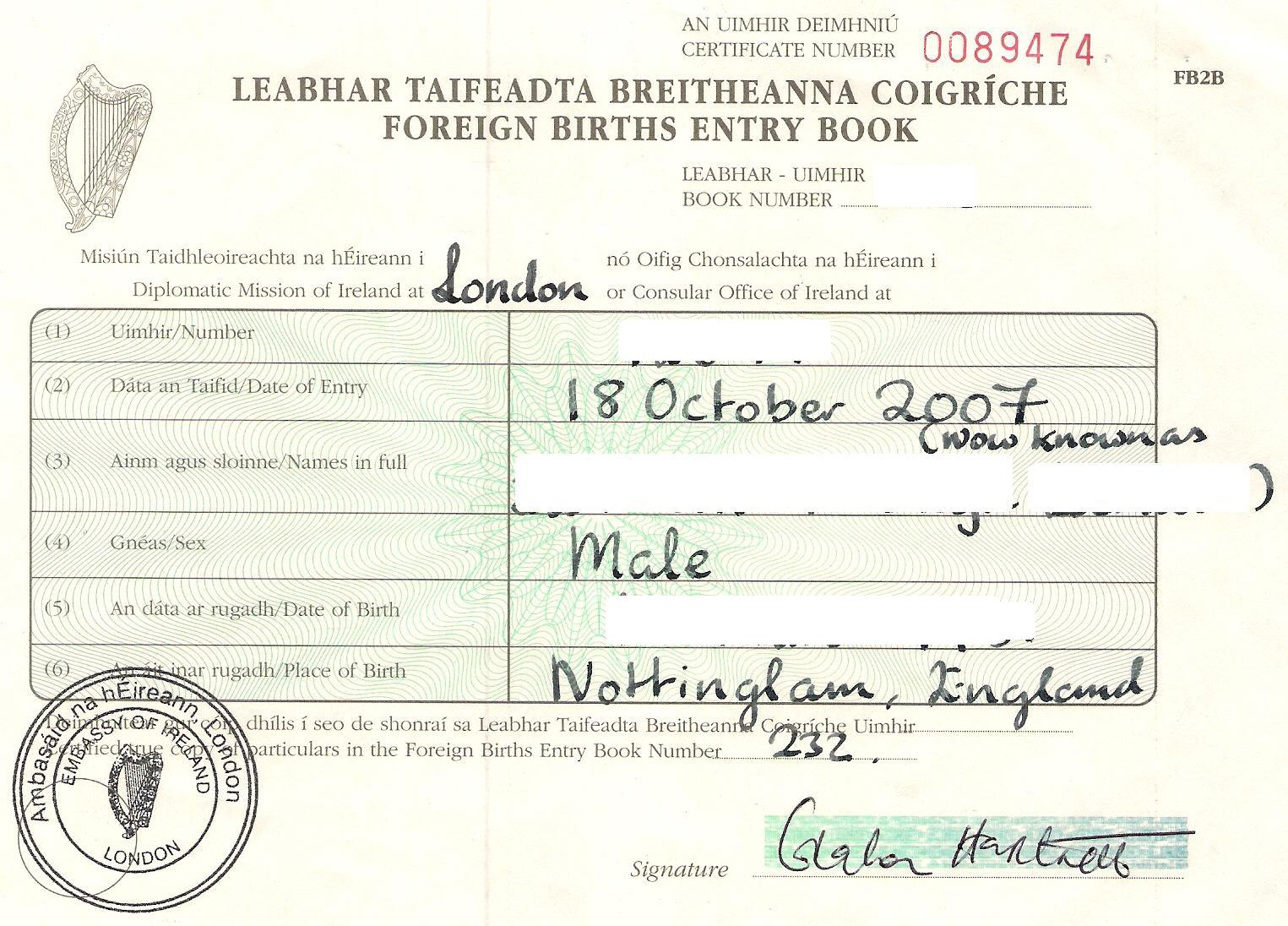
An older style foreign births registration certificate.

The Foreign Births Register (Irish: Leabhar Taifeadta Breitheanna Coigríche) is an official register of foreign births with Irish citizenship that is kept by the Department of Foreign Affairs and Trade in Dublin. A Foreign Births Entry Book is also maintained in every Irish diplomatic mission and consular office, the contents of which are from time to time transcribed into the Foreign Births Register. It is part of the system of citizenship registration established by the Irish Nationality and Citizenship Act, 1956.

== Gaining citizenship ==
A person born outside Ireland to an Irish-citizen parent who was also born outside Ireland may acquire Irish citizenship by registering onto the Foreign Births Register or a Foreign Births Entry Book. Such people become Irish citizens from the date of registration, or for those registered on or before 30 June 1986, from their date of birth, or 17 July 1956 if they were born before that date.

Once a person is on the foreign births registration certificate, any children they have who are born after this registration date are entitled to Irish citizenship by also registering on the Foreign Births Register (children born outside Ireland to Irish-citizen parents born outside Ireland do not become Irish citizens automatically). Thus, the Irish citizenship of future generations born abroad can be preserved as long as the youngest generation registers onto the Foreign Births Register before having any children.

== Certificate ==
Once entered into the register, a certified copy of the entry is issued, which takes the form of an A4 certificate bearing the signature of a senior consular official and the stamp of authenticity from the authority responsible for having made the entry e.g. Irish diplomatic mission. This certificate is printed on specially produced security paper incorporating a UV reactive Harp watermark and may be used as proof of Irish citizenship when applying for a passport without any further proof of citizenship being required.

== Applications ==
A statutory fee is charged for access to this facility which varies depending on the issuing authority. If the application is made in Dublin at the Department of Foreign Affairs and Trade, the current fee is €278 if over 18 and €153 if under. The fee outside Ireland varies by embassy, but is generally an equivalent to €278 in the local currency.

As of October 2026, applications for Foreign Birth Registration have a processing time of approximately 12 months from the date of receipt of a complete application with all the required supporting documentation.

A total of 248,892 people were entered into the register between September 1956 and October 2020. Annual numbers of applications and certificates issued have increased steeply since 2015, with the exception of 2020 and 2021 when the registration service was disrupted by the COVID-19 pandemic. An additional 138,000 were registered from 2021 to 2025 alone.

| Year | Applications received | Change in number of applications upon previous year | Applications processed^{*} | Certificates issued | Reported turnaround time |
|---|---|---|---|---|---|
| 2015 | 6,508 | — | — | 5,826 | — |
| 2016 | 14,021 | ▲115% | 8,000 | 8,519 | — |
| 2017 | 19,898 | ▲42% | 18,000 | 17,836 | — |
| 2018 | 25,283 | ▲27% | 17,000 | 17,000 | 6 months |
| 2019 | 31,908 | ▲26% | 18,000 | 19,000 | 12–18 months |
| 2020 | 17,000 | ▼47% | 12,000 | 12,396 | 12–18 months (service paused due to COVID-19 for 26 weeks) |
| 2021 | 11,546 | ▼32% | over 7000 (urgent only) | 7,605 | 24 months (service paused due to COVID-19 until November 2021) |
| 2022 | 27,694 | ▲140% | 33,000 | 16,904 | 18–24 months |
| 2023 | 35,103 | ▲27% | — | 36,878 | 9 months |
| 2024 | 42,808 | ▲22% | — | 36,363 | 9 months |
| 2025 | 54,097 | ▲26% | — | 40,250 | 9 months |

* Applications processed or certificates issued in a given year may relate to applications received in earlier years. Applications received but missing supporting documentation remain on hold.

== See also ==
- Irish nationality law
