= Executive Powers (Consequential Provisions) Act 1937 =

The Executive Powers (Consequential Provisions) Act, 1937 was an Act of the Oireachtas which retrospectively completed the abolition of the Governor-General of the Irish Free State.

In December 1936, then President of the Executive Council of the Irish Free State Éamon de Valera had ensured the passage of the Constitution (Amendment No. 27) Act, intended to abolish the office of governor-general. However he was advised by his Attorney-General, James Geoghegan, the Secretary to the Executive Council, Maurice Moynihan and Mr Matheson of the Parliamentary Draftsman's office that that Act did not actually abolish the office. They informed de Valera that removing the governor-generalship from the Irish Free State Constitution in itself did not abolish the office, as the office had an existence independent to the constitution in a number of sources, namely

- Letters Patent from the King constructing and regulating the office
- Orders in Council
- Statutory instruments
- Statute law

and in other sources. To conclusively abolish the office, all mention of the governor-generalship would need to be removed from these and others also. In May 1937 de Valera introduced the Executive Powers (Consequential Provisions) Act, 1937 to do that.

The Act had three main aims:

1. to confer power exercisable by the King in any law in effect before 12 December 1936 to be exercisable by the Executive Committee after that date;
2. to retrospectively resolve constitutional and legal problems that the removal of the office from the constitution in December 1936 had created, notably
  - the installation of the Chief Justice of the Irish Supreme Court, who had been legally required to make a declaration of office in front the governor-general, but did not do so on the (unfounded) basis that the office had ceased to exist. The installation had not complied with existing statute law and was thus invalid. The recent Courts of Justice Act (which had established a new installation procedure) was equally invalid.
  - the installation of three judges of the Supreme Court, all of whom made their declarations of office in front of the (invalidly installed) new Chief Justice, were equally invalid.
  - the installation of a new Attorney-General was also invalid since it was in breach of the requirement of the Ministers and Secretaries Act 1924 that only the governor-general could appoint him.
3. The granting of a pension to the 'former' governor-general, Domhnall Ua Buachalla. This was invalid since the post remained legally in existence.

The media and the opposition focused exclusively on the issue of the pension and failed to draw the public's attention to the fact that the new Bill was re-abolishing an office that de Valera had told them he had already abolished. By focusing on the pension (as he had hoped) the opposition failed to make capital out of one of de Valera's most dramatic and potentially humiliating mis-judgments, his first failed attempt to abolish the office of governor-general.
