= Maurice Moynihan =

Irish civil servant

Governor of the Central Bank of Ireland
- In office 29 August 1960 – 30 April 1969
- Taoiseach: Seán Lemass; Jack Lynch
- Preceded by: James McElligott
- Succeeded by: T. K. Whitaker

Personal details
- Born: Maurice Gerard Moynihan; 14 December 1902 Tralee, County Kerry, Ireland
- Died: 21 August 1999 (aged 96) Skerries, County Dublin, Ireland
- Spouse(s): Mae Conley (m. 1932; d. 1999)
- Children: 5
- Education: University College Cork

Maurice Gerard Moynihan (14 December 1902 – 21 August 1999) was an Irish economist and civil servant who served as the Governor of the Central Bank of Ireland from 1960 to 1969. He was also a co-drafter of the 1937 Constitution of Ireland, Secretary of the Government of the Irish Free State in 1937 and Knight Commander of the Papal Order of St. Gregory the Great in 1959.

== Career ==
Moynihan began his civil service career working in the Department of Finance in 1925, and his talent was quickly recognised by Minister for Finance Ernest Blythe. He was promoted to become Private Secretary to the Taoiseach, Éamon de Valera in 1932. He was appointed Secretary of the Department of the Taoiseach, and Secretary to the Government in 1937, in which post he served until 1960. In 1960, he was appointed as Governor of the Central Bank of Ireland, having been a Service Director thereof from 1953 to 1960. He was one of the "architects" of the 1937 Constitution of Ireland.

== Influence and legacy ==
He is acknowledged to have played a "central, constructive role in the coordination of government policy generally", and "his contribution to the development of the State was significant and enduring... matched only by his modesty and courteous manner" in the early formative years of the newly independent Irish Free State and later Ireland.

== Honours and tributes ==
He was conferred with an honorary Doctorate in Economic Science by the National University of Ireland in 1955, and was invested as a Knight Commander of the Papal Order of St. Gregory the Great in 1959.

On his death, he was acknowledged by Mary McAleese, the president of Ireland, as having served his country "with great distinction and integrity, employing the finest qualities in the public service". He was also described as a "most independent civil servant, respected by politicians and civil servants alike", by Professor Patrick Lynch, prominent economist and former Assistant Secretary of the Government. J.J. Lee, professor of history in Cork, described him as "one of the greatest public servants who ever served the State" and "a man in whom the institutions of the State found an absolutely trustworthy protector". He was "imbued with a profound sense of loyalty and commitment to public service". Echoing Professor Lee, he was considered in the view of the Irish Times "one of the greatest civil servants in the State."

== Publications ==
- Currency and Central Banking in Ireland – 1922–1960, by Maurice G. Moynihan, published by the Central Bank and Gill & MacMillan, Dublin, 1975.
- Speeches and Statements by Eamon de Valera – 1917–1973, by Maurice G. Moynihan, Gill & MacMillan, Dublin, 1980.
