= Anglo-Irish Treaty (disambiguation) =

The Anglo-Irish Treaty signed in 1921 led to the creation of the Irish Free State.

Anglo-Irish Treaty may also refer to:

- Anglo-Irish Trade Agreement, treaty ending the 1932–38 trade war
- Anglo-Irish Agreement, 1985 treaty giving the Republic of Ireland a consultative role in the affairs of Northern Ireland
- British–Irish Agreement, 1998 agreement (the "Good Friday Agreement") providing a framework for ending the Northern Ireland troubles
