= Irish question =

British debate over calls for Irish independence

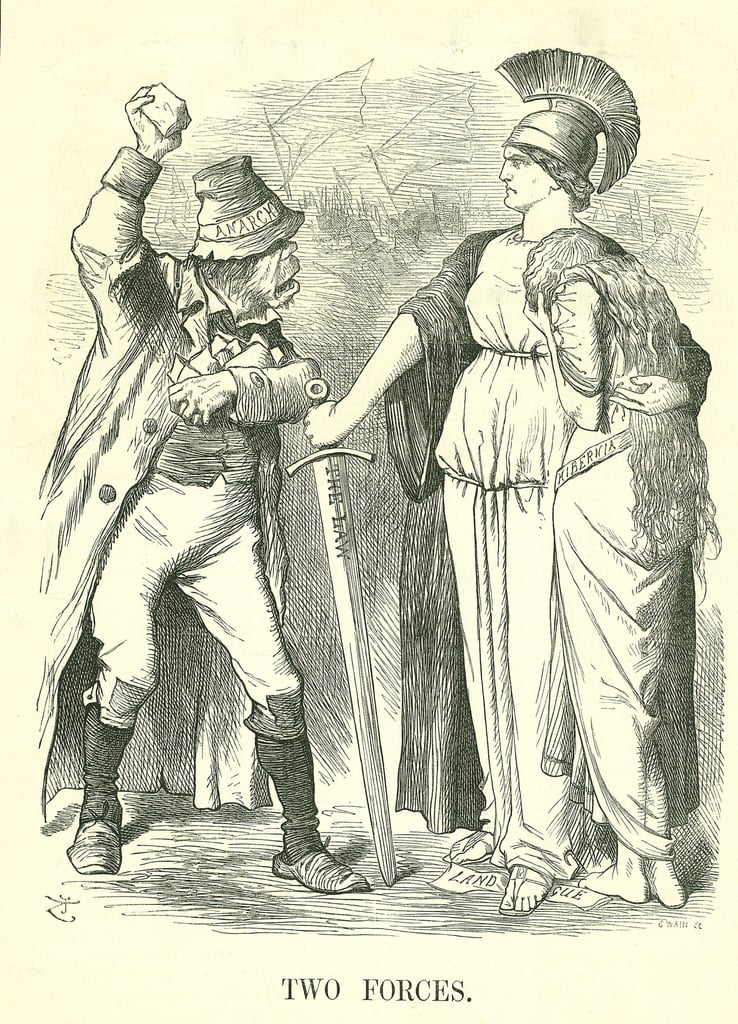
Britannia protecting her sister Hibernia from the anarchy of Irish nationalism – Punch, 1881

The Irish question was the issue, debated primarily among the British government from the early 19th century until the 1920s, of how to respond to Irish nationalism and the calls for Irish independence.

The phrase came to prominence as a result of the Acts of Union 1800 which merged the Kingdom of Great Britain with the Kingdom of Ireland to create the United Kingdom of Great Britain and Ireland, and merged the Parliament of Ireland with the Parliament of Great Britain to create the Parliament of the United Kingdom, based in Westminster. Doing so forced the British government to pay closer attention to the state of Ireland and its people.

In 1844, a future British prime minister, Benjamin Disraeli, defined the Irish question:

That dense population in extreme distress inhabited an island where there was an established church which was not their church; and a territorial aristocracy, the richest of whom lived in distant capitals. Thus they had a starving population, an absentee aristocracy, and an alien Church, and, in addition, the weakest executive in the world. That was the Irish question.

In the United Kingdom general election of 1868, a coalition of Liberals and Irish Nationalists formed based on the fact that a wrong was done to Ireland and that it must be corrected. From the general election of 1868 to 1929, and most likely past the latter year, the Liberal Party's primary platform of reform was based on Irish reform. During the first Gladstone ministry, a total of three "grievances" were made to Prime Minister William Ewart Gladstone by the Irish: "religious, agrarian, and nationalist". These were, but not limited to, Irish Catholics being persecuted since the 16th century, the poverty wrought upon by legislation, such as those targeting Ireland's woollen industry, and the Protestant Ascendancy, and Poyning's Law, which held the Irish government's action subject to the acceptation of its counterpart in London under King Henry VII.

In 1886, with the introduction of the first Home Rule Bill in the House of Commons, the term the Anglo-Irish quarrel gained favour and became more acceptable than the implied condescension of the Irish question.

The Irish question affected British politics in much the same way that the nationalities problem affected Austria-Hungary. Normal British domestic issues could not be adequately addressed because of the political divisions created by the status of Ireland. The Liberal Party split over Home Rule, with the unionist faction leaving to create the Liberal Unionist Party, ceding control to the Conservatives, thus hurting the cause of further social and political reform.

== Post-independence and contemporary usage ==
Following Irish independence and the partition of the island in the 1920s, issues relating to Northern Ireland have often been referred to as either "The Troubles" or "The Irish Problem".

In 2017, the term was also used to describe issues associated with the UK-Irish border and Brexit. The term Irish border question has been used more widely in recent years.

== See also ==
- Armenian question
- Aromanian question
- Condition-of-England question
- German question
- Jewish question
- Negro question
- Polish question
- The Race Question
