= Irish issue in British politics =

Consequences for government of the UK

It says a great deal for the power which Ireland has, both Nationalist and Orange, to lay their hands upon the vital strings of British life and politics, and to hold, dominate, and convulse, year after year, generation after generation, the politics of this powerful country.

— Winston Churchill (Secretary of State for the Colonies), 16th February 1922.

The issue of Ireland has been a major one in British politics, intermittently so for centuries. Britain's attempts to control and administer the island, or parts thereof, have had significant consequences for British politics, especially in the 19th and 20th centuries. Although nominally autonomous (as the Kingdom of Ireland) until the end of the 18th century, Ireland became part of the United Kingdom of Great Britain and Ireland in 1801.

In 1844, a future British prime minister, Benjamin Disraeli, defined what he called the Irish Question:

A dense population, in extreme distress, inhabit an island where there is an Established Church, which is not their Church, and a territorial aristocracy the richest of whom live in foreign capitals. Thus you have a starving population, an absentee aristocracy, and an alien Church; and in addition the weakest executive in the world. That is the Irish Question.

— Hansard

The Great Famine of 1845–1851 killed upward of 1 million Irish men, women, and children, and forced another million to migrate, especially to the United States. Poor handling by the British government left distrust and hatred in its wake, roiling every grievance that followed. The view in Ireland was that the combination of laissez faire policies, which permitted food exports from Ireland, and protectionist Corn Laws, which prevented import of low cost wheat, had been a major factor in the famine, and that an independent government would have mitigated it.

The Representation of the People Act 1884 enfranchised many Catholics in Ireland. Charles Stewart Parnell mobilised the Catholic vote so that the Irish Parliamentary Party held the balance of power in the Parliament of the United Kingdom. Parnell sought to re-establish home rule for Ireland and used tactics that kept British politics in turmoil. William Gladstone and the Liberal Party usually worked with Parnell in search of Home Rule, but the Liberal Party was irreversibly split in doing so, and a substantial faction left to form the Liberal Unionist Party. The result was the long-term decline of the Liberal Party.

Home Rule was passed in 1914, but suspended in operation during the First World War. The issue was resolved in 1921 by partitioning Ireland into the quasi-autonomous, Catholic-dominated, Irish Free State in the southwestern four-fifths of the island, and the Presbyterian dominated Northern Ireland in the remaining fifth, which remained part of the United Kingdom. The next round of troubles emerged in the 1960s, when the Catholics living in Northern Ireland could no longer tolerate the discriminatory policies long imposed on them by the devolved government of Northern Ireland. The Troubles – 30 years of near civil war which had sporadic but significant impact on British politics – ended with the Good Friday Agreement of 1998, a power-sharing agreement between the parties in Northern Ireland and an international treaty between Ireland and the United Kingdom, as co-guarantors.

From 2017 onwards, Britain's relationship with Ireland again disrupted British politics, specifically over Brexit. Until late 2019, Parliament was unable resolve the trilemma among three competing objectives: an open border on the island; no trade borders within the United Kingdom; and no British participation in the European Single Market and the European Union Customs Union. The government abandoned the second of these objectives by negotiating and signing the Northern Ireland protocol that took effect from early 2021.

== 18th century ==
For most of the 18th century, Ireland was largely quiet, and played a minor role in British politics. Between 1778 and 1793, nearly all the laws restricting Catholics in terms of worship, owning or leasing lands, education, and entry into the professions were repealed. Wealthy Irish Catholics attained the franchise in 1793. The main remaining restriction was the prohibition against Catholics sitting in Parliament. Prime Minister William Pitt the Younger took an active role in the reforms. King George III, a staunch Protestant, was troubled by the reforms. He balked at Catholic membership in Parliament, forcing Pitt to resign in 1801.

Although the Catholic majority was regaining its rights, Ireland's economy, politics, society, and culture were largely dominated by the Anglican landowners, who comprised the Protestant Ascendancy. There was a large Presbyterian ("Non-conformist") population in the north-east, who resented being pushed to the margins by the Anglican established church. They took the lead in cultivating Irish nationalism after 1790.

=== 1798 Rebellion ===
The 1798 Rebellion was a major uprising against British rule in Ireland. The main organising force was the Society of United Irishmen, a republican revolutionary group influenced by the ideas of the American and French revolutions: originally formed by Presbyterian radicals angry at being shut out of power by the Anglican establishment, they were joined by many from the majority Catholic population.

Following some initial successes, particularly in County Wexford, the uprising was suppressed by government militia and yeomanry forces, reinforced by units of the British Army, with a civilian and combatant death toll estimated between 10,000 and 50,000. A French expeditionary force landed in County Mayo in August in support of the rebels: despite victory at Castlebar, they were also eventually defeated. The aftermath of the Rebellion led to the passage of the Acts of Union 1800, merging the Parliament of Ireland into the Parliament of the United Kingdom.

== Early 19th century ==
The agreement which led to the Act of Union stipulated Catholic emancipation and repeal of the Penal Laws in Ireland. However, King George III blocked Catholic emancipation, citing his coronation oath to defend the Anglican Church. A campaign under Roman Catholic lawyer Daniel O'Connell led to Catholic emancipation in 1829, allowing Catholics to sit in Parliament. O'Connell then mounted an unsuccessful campaign for the Repeal of the Acts of Union.

=== Great Famine ===
When a potato blight struck Ireland in 1846, much of the peasant population lost their staple food, as cash crops were reserved for export to Great Britain. While large sums for relief were raised by private individuals and charities, inadequate action by the government, which believed in laissez-faire policies, and the protectionist Corn Laws, which made wheat unaffordable, led the problem to metastasize into a catastrophe. The class of cottiers, or farm labourers, was virtually wiped out through death and emigration, in what became known in Britain as 'The Irish Potato Famine' and in Ireland as the Great Hunger.

The famine and its memory permanently changed the island's demographic, political, and cultural landscape. Those who stayed and those who left never forgot. The mishandling of the famine became a rallying point for Irish nationalist movements. The already acerbic relations between Irish Catholics and the British Crown soured further, heightening ethnic and sectarian tensions. Republicanism became a factor.

== 1868 to 1900 ==
=== Church of Ireland ===
The first premiership of Benjamin Disraeli in 1868 was short and was dominated by the heated debate over the Church of Ireland, a Protestant church associated with the Anglican Church of England. Although Ireland was three-fourths Roman Catholic and 90% nonconformist, the Church of Ireland remained the established church and was funded by tithes (direct taxation). The Catholics and the Presbyterians resented that fact. The Irish Church was eventually disestablished by Gladstone's Irish Church Act 1869, causing divisions among the Conservatives.

=== Home Rule movement ===
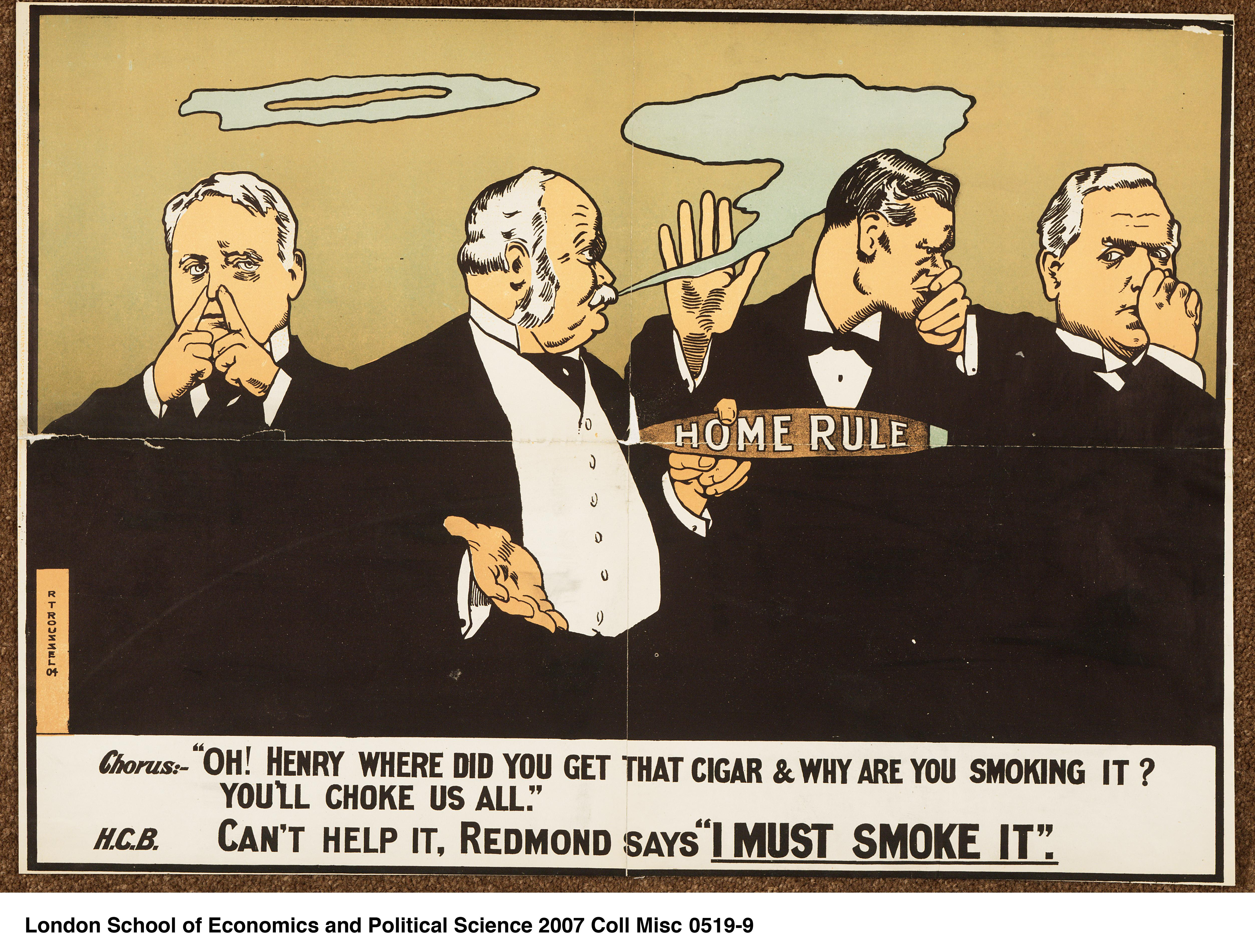
Cartoon: British politicians are forced to endure the smell of Henry Campbell-Bannerman's "cigar" of Irish Home Rule.

Most (registered, land-owning male) Irish people elected as their MPs, Liberals and Conservatives who belonged to the main British political parties. A significant minority also elected Unionists, who championed maintenance of the Union and opposed Home Rule. A former Tory barrister turned nationalist campaigner, Isaac Butt, established a new moderate nationalist movement, the Home Rule League, in the 1870s. After Butt's death the Home Rule Movement, or the Irish Parliamentary Party as it had become known, turned into a major political force under the guidance of William Shaw and in particular Charles Stewart Parnell. Born into a wealthy and powerful Anglo-Irish Anglican landowning family, he entered the House of Commons in 1875. He was a land reform agitator, and became leader of the Home Rule League in 1880. Parnell operated independently of the Liberals, and won great influence by his balancing of constitutional, radical, and economic issues, and by his skillful use of parliamentary procedure. His party fillibustered the Protection of Persons and Property Act 1881 for seven weeks until the Speaker made a very rare change to British constitutional convention to close a debate after the IPP halted all progress on a Government Bill for five days in a row. He was interned in Kilmainham Gaol in 1882 under the new Act but, as a very capable negotiator, was released when he renounced violent extra-Parliamentary action in exchange for repeal of the Act; in response, William Edward Forster resigned as Chief Secretary for Ireland, as did the Lord Lieutenant, John Spencer, 5th Earl Spencer.

=== Balance of power ===
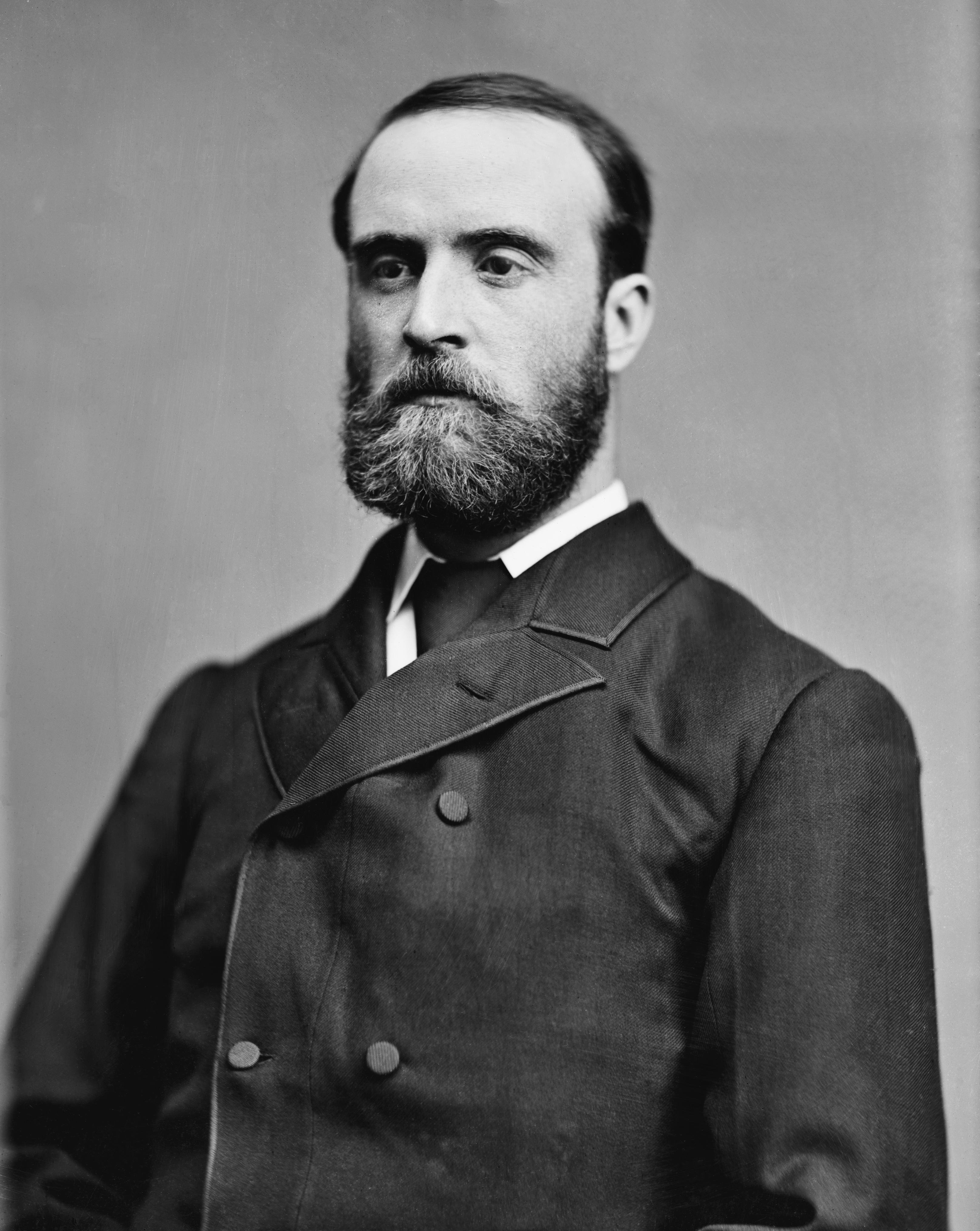
Charles Stewart Parnell, the founder of the IPP

From 1885 to 1915, the Irish Parliamentary Party led by Parnell frequently held the balance of power at Westminster between the Liberal and Conservative parties and used it to extract concessions for Ireland. The Conservative minority government of Lord Salisbury enacted the Purchase of Land (Ireland) Act 1885 ("Ashbourne Act") in return for the support of the Irish Parliamentary Party.

Parnell's movement campaigned for "Home Rule," by which Ireland would govern itself in domestic affairs inside the United Kingdom, in contrast to O'Connell who wanted complete independence subject to a shared monarch and Crown. Two Home Rule Bills (1886 and 1893) were introduced by Liberal Prime Minister Ewart Gladstone, but neither became law, mainly due to opposition from the House of Lords. The issue divided Ireland, for a significant unionist minority (largely based in Ulster), opposed Home Rule, fearing that a Catholic-Nationalist parliament in Dublin would mean rule by Rome and a degradation of Protestantism. To them, it also portended economic stagnation by Catholic peasants who would discriminate against businessmen and would impose tariffs on industry, which was located mostly in Ulster. Joseph Hocking, for example, warned that "history teaches that Rome Rule means corruption, decadence, and ruin." The last phase of Gladstone's career was devoted to the Irish question. He sought repeatedly to pass a home rule bill but failed in 1886 and again in 1893.

=== Liberal Party split ===
In 1886, the ruling Liberal Party split over Gladstone's Home Rule proposals.

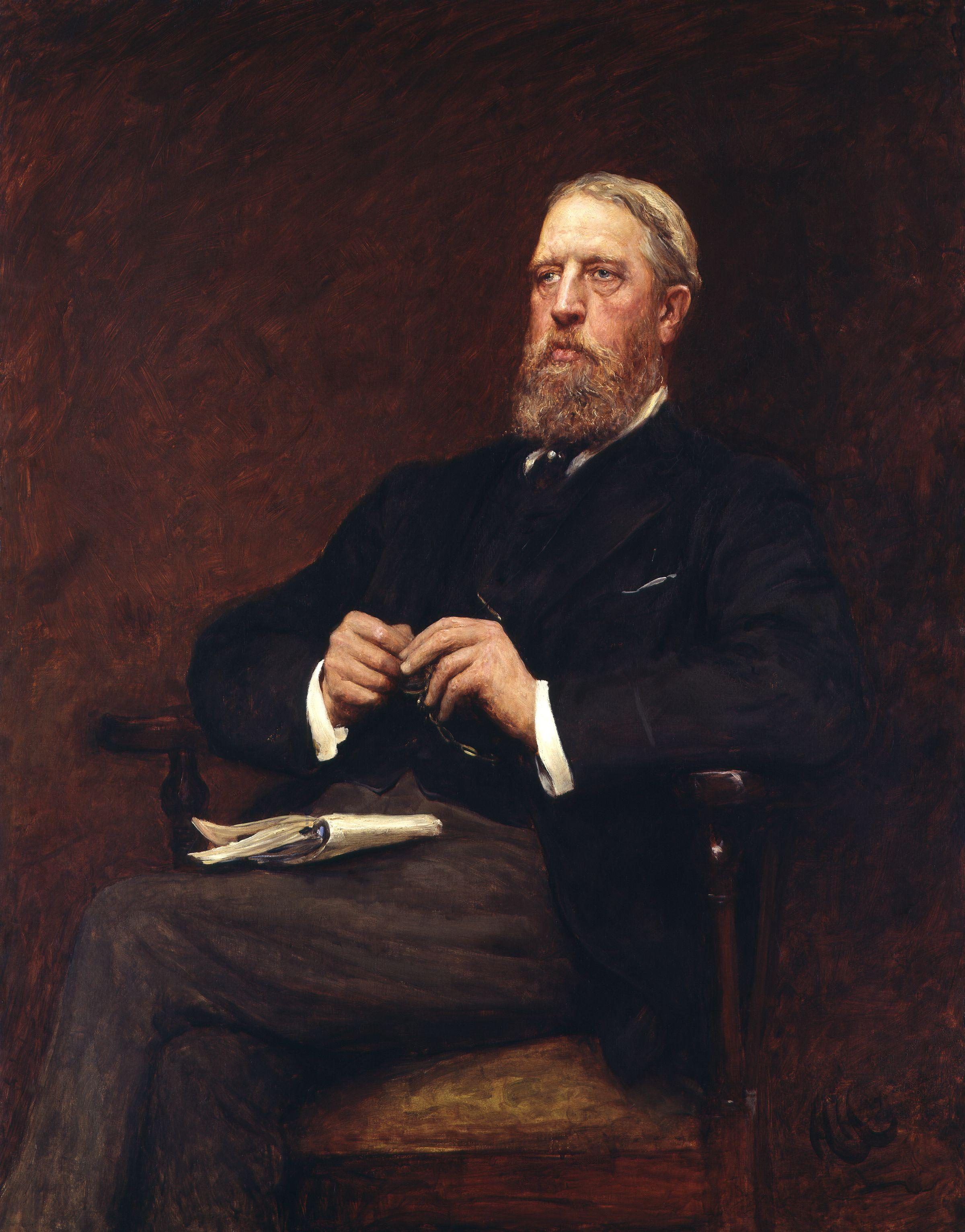
The Liberal Unionists' leader, the Duke of Devonshire (1897, NPG).

Some Liberals believed that Gladstone's Home Rule bill would lead to eventual independence for Ireland and the dissolution of the United Kingdom of Great Britain and Ireland, a prospect which they could not accept. Seeing themselves as defenders of the Union, they called themselves "Liberal Unionists", although at this stage most of them did not think the split from their former colleagues would be permanent. In reality, they first supported then in time merged with the Conservative Party, to create the Conservative and Unionist Party. The Liberal Party, which had ruled Britain for generations, became in time a shadow of its former self.

=== Fenianism ===
There were some who would not be placated by home rule under a British government. From the middle of the 18th century to almost the end of the 19th, the Fenians carried on an intermittently violent campaign against British rule. Most notably for British politics, a breakaway Irish Republican Brotherhood faction calling itself the Irish National Invincibles assassinated the British Chief Secretary for Ireland Lord Frederick Cavendish and his Permanent Under-secretary (chief civil servant) in 1882, in an incident known as the Phoenix Park Murders.

== 1900 to 1922 ==
=== Passage of Home Rule, 1910–1914 ===
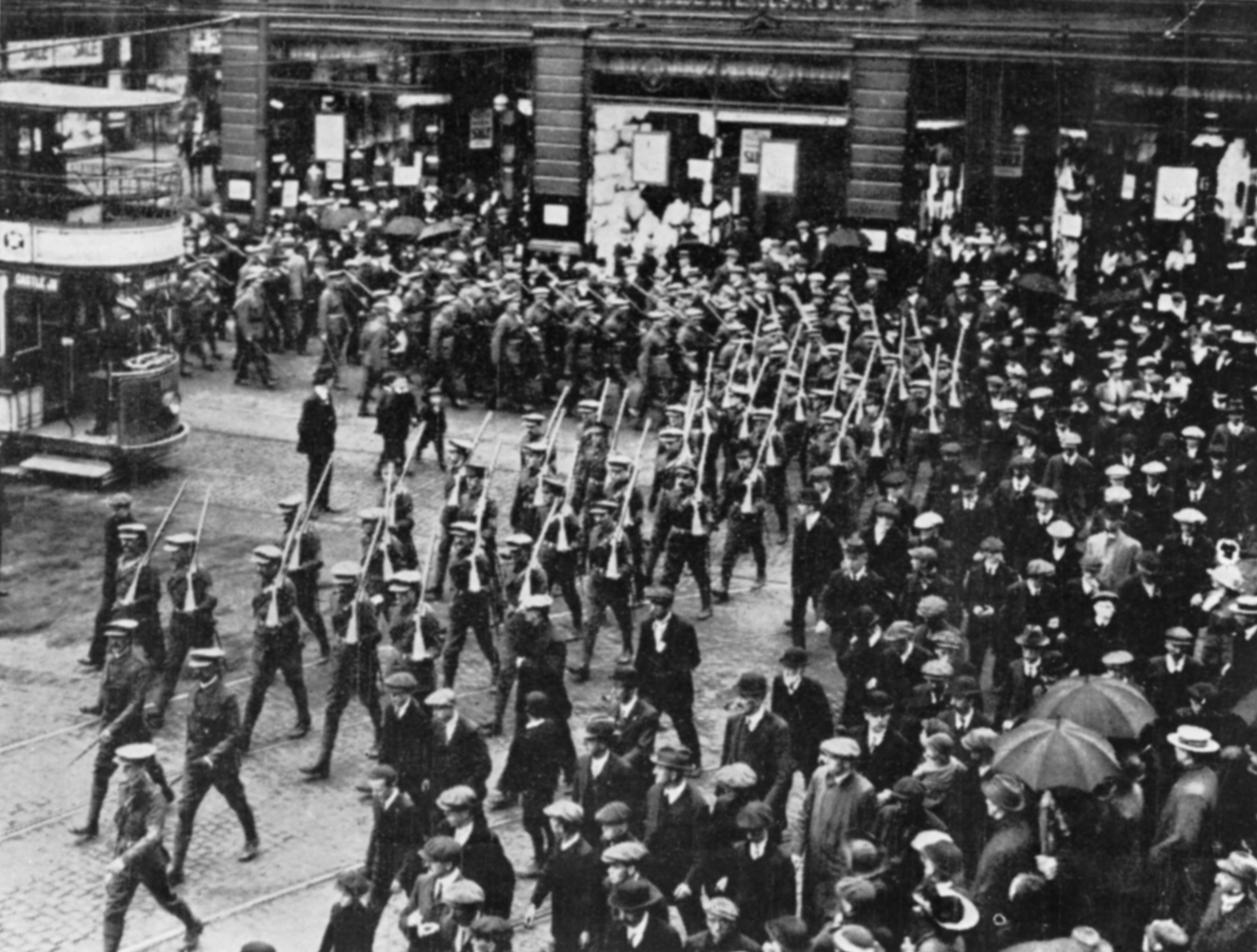
Members of the Ulster Volunteer Force march through Belfast, 1914

As a minority party after 1910 elections, the Liberals depended on the Irish vote, controlled by John Redmond. To gain Irish support for the budget and the parliament bill, Asquith promised Redmond that Irish Home Rule would be the highest priority. It proved much more complex and time-consuming than expected. Support for self-government for Ireland had been a tenet of the Liberal Party since 1886, but Asquith had not been as enthusiastic, stating in 1903 (while in opposition) that the party should not form a government which depended on the Irish Nationalist Party for its existence. After 1910, though, Irish Nationalist votes were required to stay in power. Retaining Ireland in the Union was the declared intent of all parties, and the Nationalists, as part of the majority that kept Asquith in office, were entitled to seek enactment of their plans for Home Rule, and to expect Liberal and Labour support. The Conservative and Unionist Party, with die-hard support from the Protestant Orange Order, strongly opposed Home Rule. The desire to retain a veto for the Lords on such bills had been an unbridgeable gap between the parties in the constitutional talks prior to the second 1910 election. The cabinet committee (not including Asquith) which in 1911 planned the Third Home Rule Bill opposed any special status for Protestant Ulster within majority-Catholic Ireland. Asquith later (in 1913) wrote to Winston Churchill, stating that the Prime Minister had always believed and stated that the price of Home Rule should be a special status for Ulster. In spite of this, the bill as introduced in April 1912 contained no such provision, and applied to all Ireland. Neither partition nor a special status for Ulster was likely to satisfy either side. The self-government offered by the bill was very limited, but Irish Nationalists, expecting Home Rule to come by gradual parliamentary steps, favoured it. The Conservatives and Irish Unionists opposed it. Unionists began preparing to get their way by force if necessary, prompting nationalist reciprocation. The Unionists were generally better financed and more organised. In April 1914 the Ulster Volunteers smuggled in 25,000 rifles and bayonets and over 3 million rounds of ammunition purchased from Germany. As the crisis deepened, with the Ulster Volunteers drilling openly, Churchill arranged for a Royal Navy squadron to cruise off Belfast without first raising the issue in Cabinet. It appeared to the Unionist leaders that Churchill and his friend, War Secretary John Seely, were seeking to provoke the Unionists into an act that would allow Ulster to be placed under some form of military rule. Asquith cancelled the move two days later.

==== Parliament Act ====
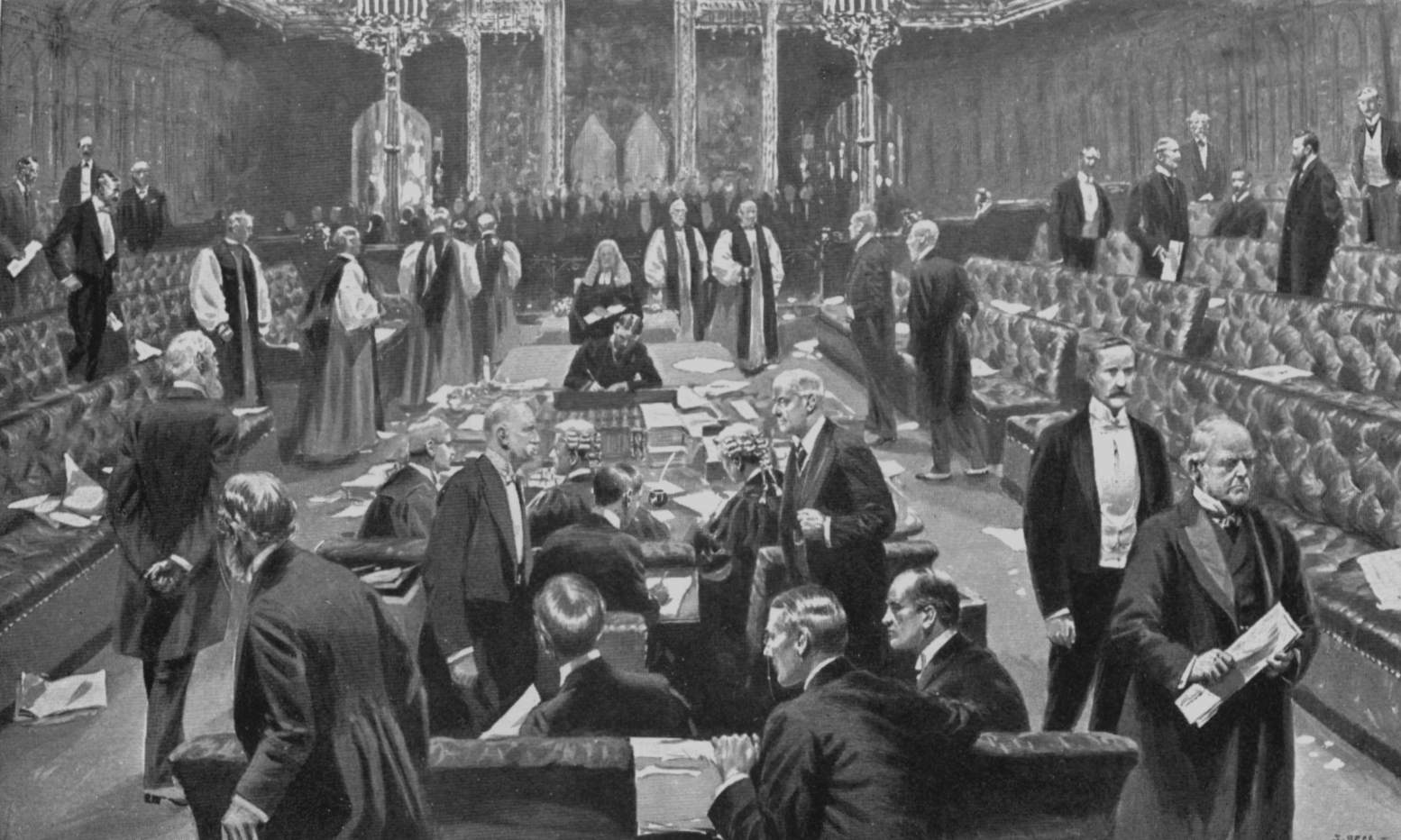
Samuel Begg's depiction of the passing of the Parliament Bill in the House of Lords, 1911

There had been an overwhelming Conservative-Unionist majority in the Lords after the Liberal split in 1886. With the Liberal Party attempting to push through popular significant welfare reforms, disagreement seemed certain to arise between the houses. Between 1906 and 1909, several important measures were watered down or rejected outright: for example, Augustine Birrell introduced the Education Bill 1906, which was intended to address nonconformist grievances arising from the Education Act 1902, but it was amended by the Lords to such an extent that it effectively became a different bill, whereupon the Commons dropped it. This led to a resolution in the House of Commons on 26 June 1907, put forward by Liberal Prime Minister Henry Campbell-Bannerman, declaring that the Lords' power ought to be curtailed. In 1909, hoping to force an election, the Lords rejected the financial bill based on the government budget (the "People's Budget") put forward by David Lloyd George, by 350 votes to 75. This action, according to the Commons, was "a breach of the constitution and a usurpation of the rights of the Commons." The Lords suggested that the Commons demonstrate at the polls the veracity of its claim that the bill represented the will of the people. The Liberal government sought to do so through the January 1910 general election. Their representation in parliament dropped heavily, but they retained a majority with the help of a significant number of Irish Parliamentary Party (IPP) and Labour MPs. The IPP saw the continued power of the Lords as detrimental to securing Home Rule. Following the election, the Lords relented on the budget (which had been reintroduced by the government), and it passed the Lords on 28 April, a day after the Commons vote.

The Lords was now faced with the prospect of a Parliament Act, which had considerable support from the Irish Nationalists. However, home rule for Ireland was the main point of contention, with (UK) Unionists looking to exempt such a law from the Parliament Act procedure, by means of a general exception for "constitutional" or "structural" bills. The Liberals supported an exception for bills relating to the monarchy and Protestant succession, but not home rule.

The government threatened another dissolution if the Parliament Act were not passed, and followed through on their threat when opposition in the Lords did not diminish. The December 1910 general election produced little change from January. King George V was asked if he would be prepared to create sufficient peers, which he would only do if the matter arose. This would have meant creating over 400 new Liberal peers. The King did, however, demand that the bill would have to be rejected at least once by the Lords before his intervention. Two amendments made by the Lords were rejected by the Commons, and opposition to the bill showed little sign of abating. This led Asquith to declare the King's intention to overcome the majority in the House of Lords by creating sufficient new peers. The bill was finally passed in the Lords by 131 votes to 114 votes, a majority of 17. This reflected a large number of abstentions.

==== Government of Ireland Act 1914 ====
The Parliament Act meant that the Unionists in the House of Lords could no longer block Home Rule, but could only delay Royal Assent by two years. Asquith decided to postpone any concessions to the Unionists until the bill's third passage through the Commons, when he believed the Unionists would be desperate for a compromise. Historian Roy Jenkins concluded that had Asquith tried for an earlier agreement, he would have had no luck, as many of his opponents wanted a fight and the opportunity to smash his government. Edward Carson, leader of the Irish Unionists in Parliament, threatened a revolt if Home Rule was enacted. The new Conservative leader, Bonar Law, campaigned in Parliament and in northern Ireland, warning Ulstermen against "Rome Rule", that is, domination by the island's Catholic majority. Many who opposed Home Rule felt that the Liberals had violated the Constitution – by pushing through major constitutional change without a clear electoral mandate, with the House of Lords, formerly the "watchdog of the constitution", not reformed as had been promised in the preamble of the 1911 Act – and thus justified actions that in other circumstances might be treason. Bonar Law was pushing hard – certainly blustering and threatening, and perhaps bluffing – but in the end his strategy proved both coherent and effective.

The passions generated by the Irish question contrasted with Asquith's cool detachment, and he deemed the prospective partition of the county of Tyrone, which had a mixed population, "an impasse, with unspeakable consequences, upon a matter which to English eyes seems inconceivably small, & to Irish eyes immeasurably big". As the Commons debated the Home Rule bill in late 1912 and early 1913, unionists in the north of Ireland mobilised, with talk of Carson declaring a Provisional Government and Ulster Volunteer Forces (UVF) built around the Orange Lodges, but in the cabinet, only Churchill viewed this with alarm. These forces, insisting on their loyalty to the British Crown but increasingly well-armed with smuggled German weapons, prepared to do battle with the British Army, but Unionist leaders were confident that the army would not aid any attempt to force Home Rule on Ulster. As the Home Rule bill awaited its third passage through the Commons, the Curragh incident occurred in April 1914. Some sixty army officers, led by Brigadier-General Hubert Gough, announced that they would rather be dismissed from the service than obey. With unrest spreading to army officers in England, the Cabinet acted to placate the officers with a statement written by Asquith reiterating the duty of officers to obey lawful orders but claiming that the incident had been a misunderstanding. War minister John Seely then added an unauthorised assurance, countersigned by General John French (the head of the army), that the government had no intention of using force against Ulster. Asquith repudiated the addition, and required Seely and French to resign. Asquith took control of the War Office himself, retaining the additional responsibility until the Great War began in 1914.

On 12 May, Asquith announced that he would secure Home Rule's third passage through the Commons (accomplished on 25 May), but that there would be an amending bill with it, making special provision for Ulster. However the Lords made changes to the amending bill unacceptable to Asquith, and with no way to invoke the Parliament Act on the amending bill, Asquith agreed to meet other leaders at an all-party conference on 21 July at Buckingham Palace, chaired by the King. When no solution could be found, Asquith and his cabinet planned further concessions to the Unionists, but this was suspended when the crisis on the Continent erupted into war. In September 1914, the Home Rule bill went on the statute book (as the Government of Ireland Act 1914) but was immediately suspended. It never went into effect.

=== World War, Partition of Ireland and Irish Independence ===
On the outbreak of the First World War in August 1914, Asquith agreed with Redmond, the leader of the INP, that the Home Rule Bill would be signed into law, accompanied by an Act suspending it for the duration of the war. This was done. This solution was supported at the time by a majority of the Irish population. Ireland was equally at war with Germany and most Unionist and Nationalist volunteer forces freely enlisted in the new British Service Army (the Military Service Act 1916 ("Conscription Act") did not apply to Ireland). Nevertheless, Republican journals openly advocated violence, denounced recruiting, and vigorously promoted the views of the Irish Republican Brotherhood (IRB). When one paper was suppressed, another took its place. Gunrunning was organised, paid for by multimillion-dollar fundraising in the United States. The IRB asked the Kaiser to include freedom of Ireland as a German war aim. Germany promised to send 20,000 rifles and machine guns, ammunition, and explosives in the custody of Sir Roger Casement. London knew trouble was brewing but decided to be extremely cautious, fearing that a full-scale clampdown on the IRB would have highly negative repercussions in the United States, which remained neutral in the war until April 1917. Instead, London decided to rely on the loyalty of Redmond and the well-established Irish Parliamentary party.

==== Easter Rising ====
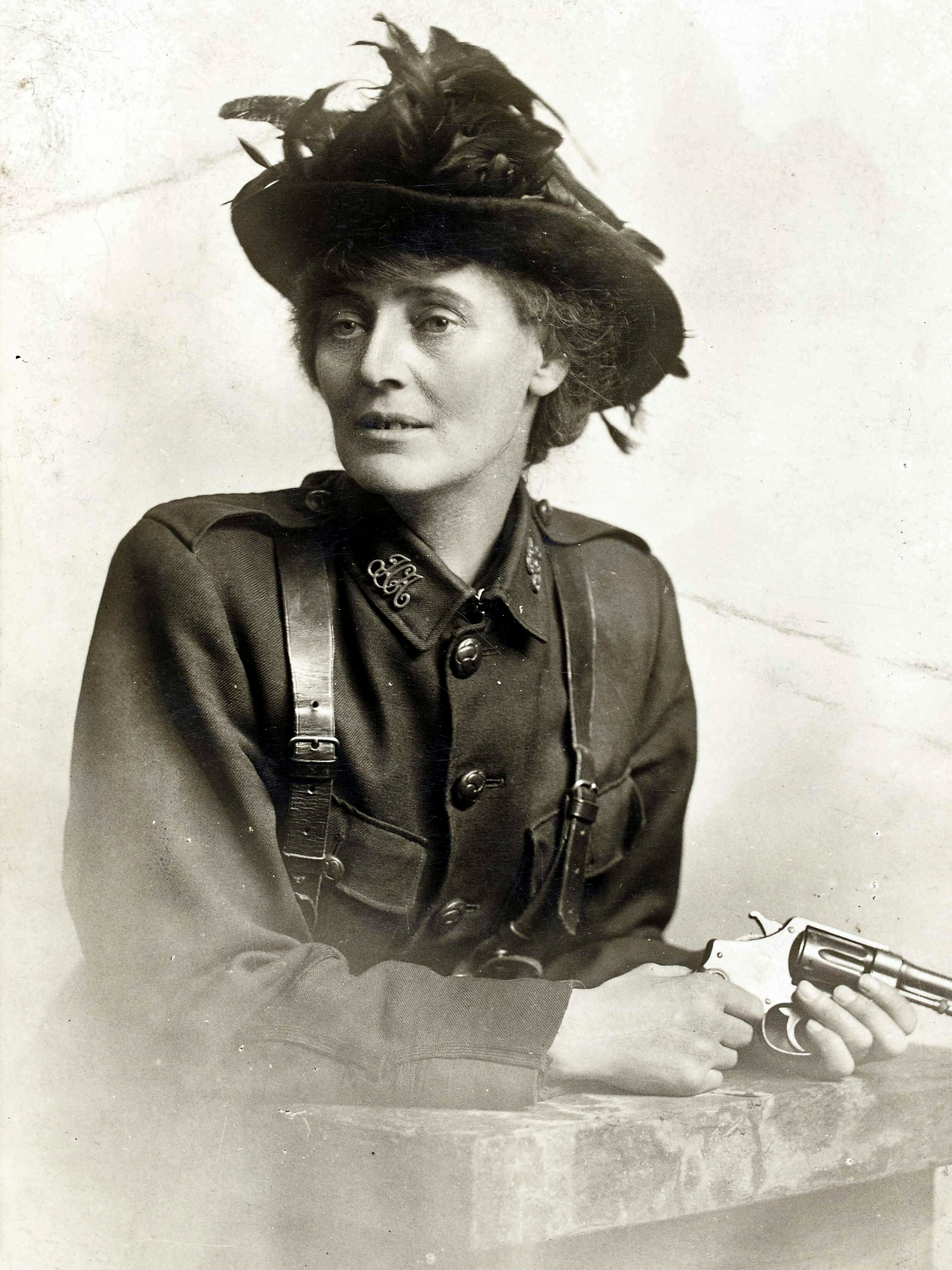
Constance Markievicz was the first woman elected to the British House of Commons in 1918, but as an Irish nationalist she did not take her seat, instead joining the First Dáil. In 1919 she was appointed Minister for Labour, the first female minister in a democratic government cabinet.

A unilaterally declared "Irish Republic" was proclaimed in Dublin at Easter 1916 – the Easter Rising. British attention was focused on the Western Front, where the Allied armies were not doing well. The uprising was very poorly organised and led, and was crushed after six days of fighting. The death total was 134 government soldiers, and 285 rebels; when the rebels surrendered, Dubliners booed them and the newspapers called their venture a foolish, futile, cruel, and mad act. Most of its leaders were court-martialled and executed. Historians Clayton Roberts and David Roberts argue:

the theme of redemption in the absence of socialist dogmas allowed the Catholic hierarchy and its worshipers to see these men as heroically devoted to Ireland.... Militarily the rebellion was foolish, futile, and bungled; theatrically it was brilliant and moving, a tragic act of singular dramatic power. It released the nationalist feeling that forms one of the most powerful forces in modern history.

Very large numbers of Nationalists across Ireland now deserted the IPP and gave their support to Sinn Féin, the Republican party demanding outright independence. In 1917, coalition Prime Minister David Lloyd George tried to introduce Home Rule at the close of the 1917–18 Irish Convention. He failed because he also was desperate for soldiers and imposed conscription on Ireland, causing the conscription crisis. As a result, in the 1918 general election, Sinn Féin won a large majority of Irish seats but its MPs refused to take their seats at Westminster. Instead they set up the First Dáil (parliament) in Dublin, announced an independent Irish Republic and declared war against the British government, which was still in control in Ireland.

The coalition government in London had three choices: implement the 1914 Home Rule Act with an amending bill to exclude Ulster; repeal it; or replace it with new legislation: it took the third route. The Government of Ireland Act 1920 partitioned Ireland, North and South. The policy had broad support in Northern Ireland, as well as England Wales and Scotland, with support from Conservatives and Liberals, although the small new Labour Party opposed partition.

=== Irish War of Independence ===
The Irish War of Independence was fought between the Irish Republican Army (IRA) and those of the United Kingdom, between January 1919 and July 1921. The IRA, led by Michael Collins, consisted of roughly 3,000 rebels and used asymmetric warfare against British forces, which included the Black and Tans and the Auxiliary Division. In 1920, in the height of the war, Prime Minister David Lloyd George introduced the Government of Ireland Act 1920 which partitioned Ireland into Southern Ireland and Northern Ireland from May 1921. In December 1921, the Irish Republic and the United Kingdom agreed an Anglo-Irish Treaty to end the war. It created a largely autonomous dominion, the Irish Free State, to replace the (failed) Southern Ireland. Meanwhile, Northern Ireland – two thirds of the ancient province of Ulster – (with home rule) remained part of the United Kingdom. The Dáil majority ratified the treaty, but De Valera, President of the Dáil, rejected it. De Valera led a civil war in Ireland but was defeated. The treaty with Britain went into effect and Northern Ireland remained with the UK.

=== 1921–1922: establishment of Northern Ireland and the Irish Free State ===
Then came the great War. Every institution, almost, in the, world was strained. Great Empires have been overturned. The whole map of Europe has been changed. The position of countries has been violently altered. The modes of thought of men, the whole outlook on affairs, the grouping of parties, all have encountered violent and tremendous changes in the deluge of the world, but as the deluge subsides and the waters fall short we see the dreary steeples of Fermanagh and Tyrone emerging once again.

— Winston Churchill (Secretary of State for the Colonies), 16th February 1922.

Resolution of the Irish issue became feasible when the Conservative Party changed from its inflexible commitment to union of Great Britain with all of Ireland. The new factors included Lloyd George's bargaining skills; new, more and flexible Conservative leaders; relaxation of die-hard determination after the guarantee of permanent union of most of Ulster in the UK; and general disapproval of the policy of coercion. The Treaty of 1921 was inconsistent with Labour Party Irish policy. Nevertheless, the two Labour MPs supported it in debate as did the Labour press. Labour wanted an end to the Irish imbroglio so Britain could return to class-based issues. With the Free State at arm's length and Northern Ireland securely part of the UK, the Irish issue faded away and became much less central to British politics.

== 1923 to 2015 ==
=== Irish Free State, Ireland ===
In 1937, taking advantage of the Edward VIII abdication crisis and the Statute of Westminster 1931, the Irish Free State distanced itself further from the United Kingdom, changing its name to "Ireland" (or, in Irish, "Éire"). A trade war took place in the 1930s; as part of the settlement in 1938, the British were no longer allowed access to three naval ports. Ireland declared itself neutral in the Second World War. In 1948, Ireland declared itself a republic and so left the British Commonwealth.

Britain's political interest in this part of the island formally ceased with its passage of the Ireland Act 1949 at Westminster. Nevertheless, the two states co-operated formally and informally to try to resolve the Troubles in Northern Ireland. The (failed) Anglo-Irish Agreement (treaty) of 1985 and the British-Irish treaty element of the Good Friday Agreement of 1998 are the more important of these.

=== Northern Ireland, The Troubles ===
The Government of Northern Ireland from 1921 was fashioned by such Protestant leaders as Sir Edward Carson and Sir James Craig. It presided over social, cultural, political and economic discrimination against the Catholic minority. Northern Ireland became, in the words of David Trimble, a "cold place for Catholics." From the civil rights marches of 1968 through years of inter-communal violence – known as "The Troubles" – until the Good Friday Agreement in 1998, Northern Ireland was in a state of near civil war. This spilled over on occasion to Great Britain, including notably for British politics the assassination of Airey Neave and the attempted assassination of Prime Minister Margaret Thatcher and her ministers.

== 2016 to 2019 ==
=== Balance of power again ===
At the 2017 United Kingdom general election, the Conservative government lost its overall majority. A Northern Irish political party, the Democratic Unionist Party (DUP), held the balance of power and negotiated favourable financial terms for Northern Ireland in exchange for a confidence and supply arrangement to support the government. This arrangement did not extend to supporting the Government's Brexit plans: the DUP vetoed Prime Minister Theresa May's draft agreement of December 2017 and voted against both the Government's 2018 draft withdrawal agreement and the proposal for a UK/EU customs union proposed by Kenneth Clarke. (Either would have had the effect of avoiding the need for the Northern Ireland Protocol in the 2020 withdrawal agreement, negotiated after the DUP had lost the balance of power following the 2019 election.)

=== Brexit and the Irish border ===
After Brexit, the Republic of Ireland–United Kingdom border on the island of Ireland would be the only significant external EU land border between the United Kingdom and the European Union, with potentially severe impact on Northern Ireland if there were a hard border. Both the UK and the EU have prioritised avoidance of a 'hard border' in the Withdrawal Agreement with the Irish government, in particular, seeing an open border on the island of Ireland as an essential element of the Good Friday Agreement.

The British government was faced with a trilemma among three competing objectives: (a) an open border on the island; (b) no border between Northern Ireland and Great Britain; and (c) no British participation in the European Single Market and the European Union Customs Union. The 'backstop' would have resolved the trilemma by retaining participation in the Single Market until a means to have an 'invisible' border in Ireland could be delivered. Many Brexit-supporting Conservative and DUP MPs opposed the Northern Ireland backstop because it lacked a specified end-date, potentially tying the UK to many EU rules indefinitely. The EU side (especially the Irish Government) saw a time-limited guarantee as without value, in particular due to scepticism about any near-term delivery of 'alternative arrangements' for the Irish border.

== 2020 onwards ==
=== Northern Ireland protocol; effect of Northern Ireland on UK/EU relations ===
At the 2019 United Kingdom general election (December 2019), the Conservative Party achieved a substantial majority and no longer needed DUP support. In 2020, Prime Minister Boris Johnson completed negotiations on the Brexit withdrawal agreement that resolved the trilemma by including the Northern Ireland Protocol which established controls over exports from Great Britain to Northern Ireland, over-riding DUP opposition. Within six months of signing the agreement, the Johnson government sought to renegotiate it. As of September 2021, the continuing stand-off over the arrangements for Northern Ireland threatened other areas in the relationship between the UK and the EU.

In 2022, Rishi Sunak the first prime minister to attend a British-Irish Council summit since 2007, reiterated his commitment to restoring the Northern Ireland Executive, and said he was "determined to deliver" to restore power-sharing. DUP leader Sir Jeffrey Donaldson said any outcome of UK-EU negotiations on the protocol must have cross-community support in Northern Ireland.

== See also ==
- All-for-Ireland League, 1906–1918
- Cork Free Press 1910 – 1916
- History of Ireland (1801-1923)
- History of Northern Ireland
- Home Rule Act 1914
- Ireland and World War I
- Irish Convention
- Irish Home Rule movement, 1870–1921
- Irish Land Acts, 1870–1901
- Irish Land and Labour Association, 1890s
- Irish Parliamentary Party, IPP, 1874–1918
- Irish Reform Association, `1904-05
- Irish Republican Army
- Irish nationalism
- Land Conference, 1902
- Michael Davitt, 1846–1906
- National Volunteers
- No Rent Manifesto, 1881
- Plan of Campaign, 1886–1891
- Unionism in Ireland
- United Irish League, 1898-1920s

== Sources ==
- Ensor, R. C. K. (1952). England 1870–1914. The Oxford History of England. Oxford: Clarendon Press. OCLC 5079147.
- Bradley, A. W.; Ewing, K. D. (2007). Constitutional and Administrative Law (14th ed.). Harlow, United Kingdom: Longman. ISBN 978-1-4058-1207-8.
- Keir, David L. (1938). The Constitutional History of Modern Britain. London: A & C Black. OCLC 463283191.
