= Treaty Ports (Ireland) =

UK naval bases in Ireland, 1922–1938

Following the establishment of the Irish Free State, three deep water Treaty Ports (Irish: Calafoirt an Chonartha) at Berehaven, Spike Island (off modern Cóbh), and Lough Swilly were retained by the United Kingdom in accordance with the Anglo-Irish Treaty of 6 December 1921.

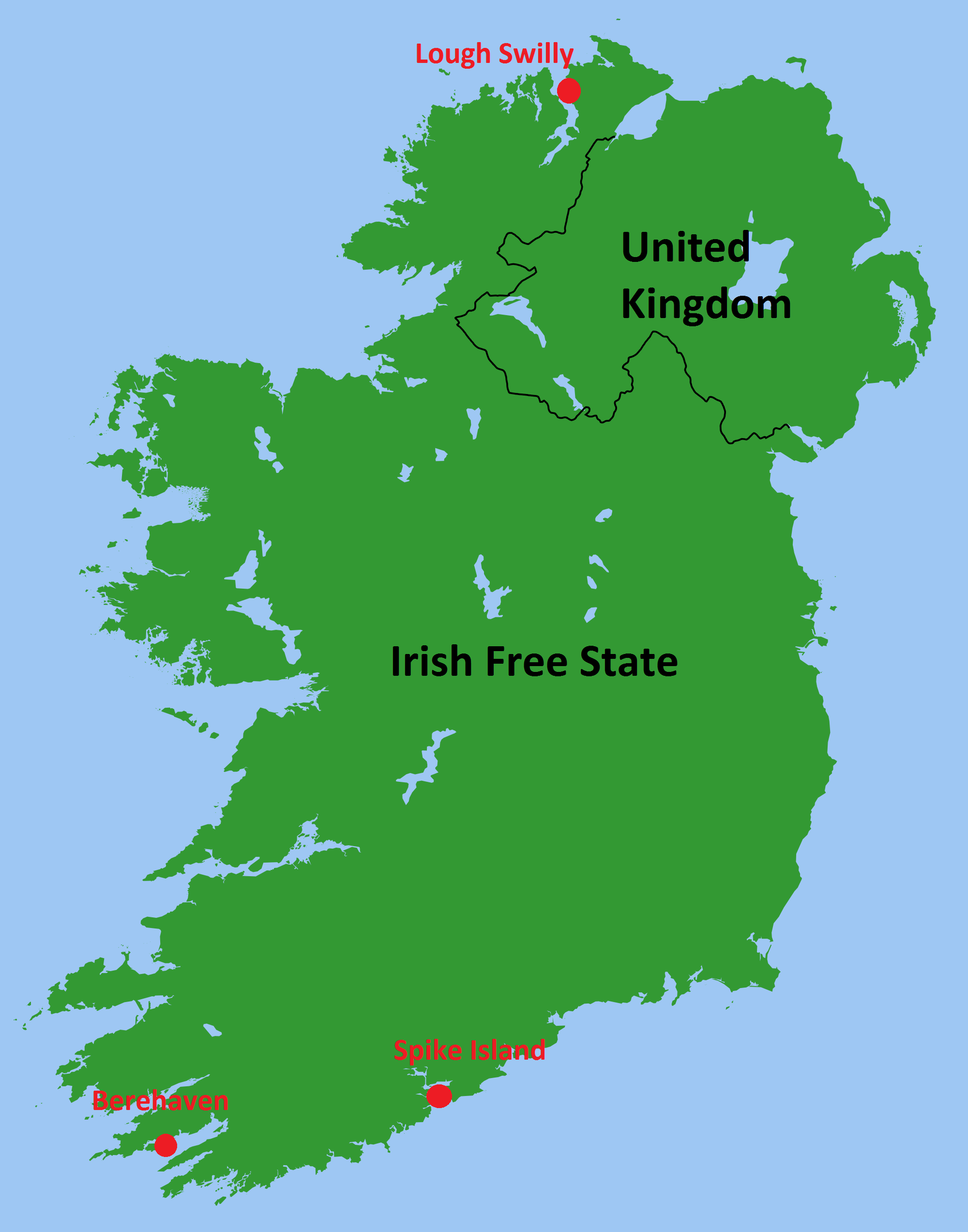
Location of the Treaty Ports in the Irish Free State, renamed Ireland in 1937 (1922–1938)

The main reason for the retention of the ports was the U-boat Campaign around Irish coasts during World War I and the concern of the British government that it might recur. As a part of the overall Anglo-Irish settlement, all other Royal Navy, British Army and RAF personnel and equipment were to evacuate the Free State.

As part of the settlement of the Anglo-Irish Trade War in the 1930s, the ports were transferred to Ireland (the Free State's successor) in 1938 following agreements reached between the British and Irish governments.

== Terms of the treaty ==
In 1921, Éamon de Valera originally offered – in an early version of the Anglo-Irish Treaty – to allow the British to continue to use the ports for a further period of five years. The British would also be able to use whatever harbours they required in wartime.

8. That for five years, pending the establishment of Irish coastal defence forces, or for such other period as the Governments of the two countries may later agree upon, facilities for the coastal defence of Ireland shall be given to the British Government as follows:
  (a) In time of peace such harbour and other facilities as are indicated in the Annex hereto, or such other facilities as may from time to time be agreed upon between the British Government and the Government of Ireland.
  (b) In time of war such harbour and other Naval facilities as the British Government may reasonably require for the purposes of such defence as aforesaid.

However, Article 8 was defeated by republicans within de Valera's own party and removed from the final terms of the treaty. Instead, the issue of the ports was addressed in Article 7:

The Government of the Irish Free State shall afford to His Majesty's Imperial Forces:

(a) In time of peace such harbour and other facilities as are indicated in the Annex hereto, or such other facilities as may from time to time be agreed between the British Government and the Government of the Irish Free State; and
(b) In time of war or of strained relations with a Foreign Power such harbour and other facilities as the British Government may require for the purposes of such defence as aforesaid.

The Annex referred to in that Article read as follows:

ANNEX

The following are the specific facilities required:

Dockyard Port at Berehaven

(a) Admiralty property and rights to be retained as at the date hereof. Harbour defences to remain in charge of British care and maintenance parties.

Queenstown

(b) Harbour defences to remain in charge of British care and maintenance parties. Certain mooring buoys to be retained for use of His Majesty's ships.

Belfast Lough

(c) Harbour defences to remain in charge of British care and maintenance parties.

Lough Swilly

(d) Harbour defences to remain in charge of British care and maintenance parties.

Aviation

(e) Facilities in the neighbourhood of the above Ports for coastal defence by air.

Oil Fuel Storage

(f) Haulbowline, Rathmullen – To be offered for sale to commercial companies under guarantee that purchasers shall maintain a certain minimum stock for Admiralty purposes.

The Annex included reference to Belfast Lough because Northern Ireland was included within the original territory of the Irish Free State, although under the Treaty it had the right to opt out of the Free State and back into the UK. It did so on 8 December 1922. With the departure of Northern Ireland from the Free State, this left three United Kingdom bases in the territory of the Free State (subsequently renamed "Ireland" in the 1937 Constitution). (Note: The UK refused to acknowledge this change of name, insisting on using only the Irish name for the state, Éire, and even then always misspelling it as "Eire".) The continued occupation by the United Kingdom of these bases was increasingly irksome, because Irish foreign policy had moved from a position of wanting some Royal Navy protection in 1922 to being a champion for neutrality in the 1930s at the League of Nations.

Notably, the position of the Treaty Ports was raised by de Valera in correspondence with the British government in 1932 shortly before the beginning of the Economic War, where he noted:

For Ireland, however, [the Anglo-Irish Treaty] has meant... [inter alia that] British maintenance parties are still in occupation in some of our principal ports, even in the area of the Free State. Our coastal defence is still retained in British hands. Britain claims the right in times of war or strained relations with a foreign Power to make demands upon Ireland which if granted will make our right to neutrality a mockery.

== Agreement on transfer of Treaty Ports ==
From 1932 until 1938, the governments of the former Irish Free State and the United Kingdom had been involved in a long-running Anglo-Irish Trade War that was not in the interest of either state's economy. In September 1937 Malcolm MacDonald made it clear to de Valera that the United Kingdom was prepared to give up the ports if the Irish gave a guarantee that the British could use them in times of war. Under pressure to ease the burden of the Trade War, in November 1937 de Valera proposed talks between the two governments. Shortly afterwards, the Irish Situation Committee chaired by Prime Minister Neville Chamberlain recommended a potential package deal for Ireland that would include returning the ports subject to the agreement of the chiefs of staff. Chamberlain had come to the view that it was worth surrendering the treaty ports unconditionally "to obtain the essential goodwill of the Irish Free State". Negotiations to settle the matters in dispute took place in 1938. The Anglo-Irish Trade Agreement was signed on 25 April 1938; the section relating to the Treaty Ports was as follows:

AN AGREEMENT REGARDING ARTICLES 6 AND 7 OF THE ARTICLES OF AGREEMENT OF DECEMBER 6, 1921

The Government of Éire and the Government of the United Kingdom have agreed as follows:

1. The provisions of Articles 6 and 7 of the Articles of Agreement for a Treaty between Great Britain and Ireland signed on the 6th day of December, 1921, and of the Annex thereto shall cease to have effect.
2. Thereafter the Government of the United Kingdom will transfer to the Government of Éire the Admiralty property and rights at Berehaven, and the harbour defences at Berehaven, Cobh (Queenstown) and Lough Swilly now occupied by care and maintenance parties furnished by the United Kingdom, together with buildings, magazines, emplacements, instruments and fixed armaments with ammunition therefor at present at the said ports.
3. The transfer will take place not later than the 31st December, 1938. In the meantime the detailed arrangements for the transfer will be the subject of discussion between the two Governments.

Done in duplicate at London, this 25th day of April, 1938.

The Agreement was subject to parliamentary approval by both parties. The United Kingdom subsequently enacted the Eire (Confirmation of Agreements) Act 1938, which put in effect, among other things, the British government's agreement to transfer the Treaty Ports.

=== Spike Island handover (11 July 1938) ===
On 12 July 1938, The Times (London) reported on the handover of Spike Island, near Cobh (51°50′06″N 08°17′06″W) on 11 July 1938 as follows:

CORK FORTS HANDED OVER – Amid the booming of guns the last British troops stationed at Spike Island in Cork Harbour this evening handed over custody of the island and the adjoining fortifications to the troops of Eire .

This is the first stage in pursuance of the defence provisions of the agreement recently concluded in London between the British Government and Mr. de Valera. The defences at Berehaven and at Lough Swilly will be handed over to Irish custody before the end of the year. Spike Island has had a long and interesting history, and for more than 150 years the British flag has flown over it as one of the main defence works on the southern coast. For years Spike was a penal settlement and was continued as such down to the truce of 1921. To-day was the seventeenth anniversary of the truce.

For the ceremony of taking over the fortifications the Government of Eire sent out a number of invitations, the guests including Ministers, members of the Dáil and Senate, and leaders of the old Irish Republican Army. A decorated train brought the guests from Dublin to Cobh, and a tender carried them to Spike Island, where about 300 Irish troops had already landed under Major Maher. Only a small party of British troops remained, and Captain O'Halloran, who was in charge, handed over the forts to Major Maher on behalf of the Eire Government at 6.20 p.m., and the Union Jack was lowered. The British soldiers then went aboard the motor-vessel Innisfallen and left for Fishguard, a salute being fired as the vessel departed.

The British had already departed when Mr. de Valera and Mr. Frank Aiken, the Minister for Defence, arrived in a launch, being greeted by a salute of 19 guns. The troops were formed up around the flagstaff and Mr. de Valera ran up the tricolour national flag of Eire over Westmoreland Fort to the accompaniment of a salute of 21 guns. As the flag was broken there were cheers, re-echoed by the thousands gathered on the mainland. Simultaneously the flag was saluted at barracks in Dublin, the Curragh, Athlone, and other military centres. The warship H.M.S. Acasta, which has been in the port on duty, left about the time the Innisfallen sailed, and both were well out to sea by the time the Irish flag was hoisted on the island.

The invitations to the Irish handover celebration read as follows:

The Minister for Defence on behalf of the Government of Ireland requests the honour of the company of XXX on the occasion of the handing over of the Cobh Harbour Defences and the raising of the National Flag at Spike Island, Cobh, Co. Cork on Monday, 11th July 1938 at 8pm – RSVP etc.

=== Berehaven handover (29 September 1938) ===
On 1 October 1938, The Times reported the handover of forts and batteries (known collectively as Berehaven) around Castletownbere and on Bere Island (51.64°N 9.90°W) on 29 September 1938 as follows:

LAST BRITISH TROOPS LEAVE EIRE – The last of the British troops stationed at the Southern Irish coast defences left last night for England. British troops under Major Clarke on Thursday officially handed over the fort at Berehaven, 100 miles from Cork City, and yesterday they entrained at Bantry and arrived at Cork during the afternoon. After spending a few hours in the city, they embarked in the motor-vessel Innisfallen for Fishguard, being seen off by large crowds that gathered at the quayside.

The Times' choice of headline was a little misleading in one respect: the British troops at Berehaven were not the last troops to leave the Irish state. The evacuation of Lough Swilly was yet to take place.

=== Lough Swilly handover (3 October 1938) ===
On 4 October 1938, The Times reported on the handover of Lough Swilly at Fort Dunree in County Donegal (55°11′48.26″N 7°33′10.95″W) on 3 October 1938 as follows:

FORTS HANDED OVER TO EIRE – Britain's last forts in Eire, those on the gale-swept Lough Swilly at Dunree and Leenan, were surrendered to the Eire Defence Forces yesterday. The ceremony at Dunree was witnessed by only a dozen spectators. The Union Jack, was hauled down by two Royal Artillery N.C.O.s and the Eire green, white, and orange flag was run up by two N.C.O.s of the Coastal Artillery Defence Force. The ceremony was brought forward from October 26, the date originally fixed under the Anglo-Irish Pact, on account of the international situation. When the British troops left last evening en route for Shoeburyness, their new headquarters, they were given a cordial send off. By a coincidence Sergeant O'Flynn, of the Royal Artillery, who hauled down the Union Jack, and Sergeant McLaughlin, of the Eire force, who hoisted the tricolour, are brothers-in-law.

== British dissent ==
Following the agreement to hand over the Treaty Ports to the Irish Free State, Winston Churchill was one of only a few MPs who were critical of the decision. In 1938 he addressed the UK's House of Commons calling it a "folly":

When I read this Agreement in the newspapers a week ago I was filled with surprise. On the face of it, we seem to give everything away and receive nothing in return ... But then I supposed there was another side to the Agreement, and that we were to be granted some facilities and rights in Southern Ireland in time of war. That, I notice, was the view taken by a part of the Press, but soon Mr. de Valera in the Dáil made it clear that he was under no obligations of any kind and, as the Prime Minister confirmed ... On the contrary, Mr. de Valera has not even abandoned his claim for the incorporation of Ulster ...

We are told that we have ended the age-long quarrel between England and Ireland, but that is clearly not true, because Mr. de Valera has said that he will never rest until Partition is swept away. Therefore, the real conflict has yet to come ... [The Anglo-Irish] Treaty has been kept in the letter and the spirit by Great Britain, but the Treaty has been violated and repudiated in every detail by Mr. de Valera. ... The ports in question, Queenstown, Berehaven and Lough Swilly, are to be handed over unconditionally, with no guarantees of any kind, as a gesture of our trust and goodwill, as the Prime Minister said, to the Government of the Irish Republic.

When the Irish Treaty was being shaped in 1922 I was instructed by the Cabinet to prepare that part of the Agreement which dealt with strategic reservations. I negotiated with Mr. Michael Collins, and I was advised by Admiral Beatty ... The Admiralty of those days assured me that without the use of these ports it would be very difficult, perhaps almost impossible, to feed this Island in time of war. Queenstown and Berehaven shelter the flotillas which keep clear the approaches to the Bristol and English Channels, and Lough Swilly is the base from which the access to the Mersey and the Clyde is covered ... If we are denied the use of Lough Swilly and have to work from Lamlash, we should strike 200 miles from the effective radius of our flotillas, out and home; and if we are denied Berehaven and Queenstown, and have to work from Pembroke Dock, we should strike 400 miles from their effective radius out and home. These ports are, in fact, the sentinel towers of the western approaches, by which the 45,000,000 people in this Island so enormously depend on foreign food for their daily bread, and by which they can carry on their trade, which is equally important to their existence.

In 1922 the Irish delegates made no difficulty about this. They saw that it was vital to our safety that we should be able to use these ports and, therefore, the matter passed into the structure of the Treaty without any serious controversy. Now we are to give them up, unconditionally, to an Irish Government led by men I do not want to use hard words whose rise to power has been proportionate to the animosity with which they have acted against this country, no doubt in pursuance of their own patriotic impulses, and whose present position in power is based upon the violation of solemn Treaty engagements.

But what guarantee have you that Southern Ireland, or the Irish Republic, as they claim to be and you do not contradict them will not declare neutrality if we are engaged in war with some powerful nation? Under this Agreement, it seems to me ... that Mr. de Valera's Government will at some supreme moment of emergency demand the surrender of Ulster as an alternative to declaring neutrality.

Mr. de Valera has given no undertaking, except to fight against Partition as the main object of his life. It would be a serious step for a Dublin Government to attack these forts while they are in our possession and while we have the right to occupy them. It would be an easy step for a Dublin Government to deny their use to us once we have gone ... You are casting away real and important means of security and survival for vain shadows and for ease.

Churchill also remarked that the concessions under the Agreements of 1938 were "astonishing triumphs" for Irish leader Éamon de Valera. Churchill also asked would it not be "far better to give up the £10,000,000 [a one-off Irish payment under the Agreement], and acquire the legal right, be it only on a lease granted by treaty, to use these harbours when necessary?" Mr Churchill also made a remark concerning the name by which the Irish state would henceforth be described in the UK (Eire) – "I have not been able to form a clear opinion on the exact juridical position of the Government of that portion of Ireland called Southern Ireland, which is now called Eire. That is a word which really has no application at the present time, and I must say, even from the point of view of the ordinary uses of English, that it is not customary to quote a term in a foreign language, a capital town, a geographical place, when there exists a perfectly well-known English equivalent [Ireland]. It is usual to say Paris not Paree."

With the outbreak of the Second World War in September 1939, Churchill's concerns proved justified. The escort groups' refuelling facilities at Berehaven and Queenstown were 200 miles (320 km) further west than the nearest ones in Northern Ireland and Great Britain. To compensate for the distance, allied convoys from North America had to be routed via Iceland to the ports in Northern Ireland in the early months of the Battle of the Atlantic. However, this decision arguably proved more practical because the shorter sea lanes around Ireland's southern coast soon became vulnerable to German anti-shipping air attacks following the Fall of France in June 1940. The Iceland route also provided adequate air cover and escort refuelling for allied convoys.

Nevertheless, many in the Royal Navy felt resentment towards the handover of the Irish Treaty Ports because they would have provided cover to convoys heading south to Gibraltar and North Africa. The Admiralty later estimated that ceding the ports led directly to the loss of 368 Allied ships and 5,070 lives during the war (Churchill was ridiculed for considering that de Valera might declare Ireland neutral).

When the country was part of the United Kingdom of Great Britain and Ireland, the Royal Navy had maintained a separate Commander-in-Chief, the Commander-in-Chief, Coast of Ireland, as a Flag Officer distinct from others on the UK coasts.

== See also ==
- Statement relating to Defence (UK White Paper, 1935, initiating rearmament).
- Irish neutrality during World War II
  - The Emergency
  - Donegal Corridor
- Irish Naval Service
- Plan W – Plan of joint military operations during World War II between the governments of Ireland and the United Kingdom, devised between 1940 and 1942, to be executed in the event of an invasion of Ireland by Nazi Germany.
- Akrotiri and Dhekelia
- Irish issue in British politics
