= Anglo-Irish trade war =

1932–38 economic conflict

- Date: July 1932 - 25 April 1938
- Location: Seas around ireland
- Result: Anglo-Irish Trade Agreement: Ireland paid a lump sum of £10 million instead of continuing land annuity payments; All trade tariffs were removed; Britain returned the Treaty Ports to Ireland

Parties
Irish Free State (until 1937); Republic of Ireland (from 1937)	United Kingdom

Lead figures
Éamon de Valera	Ramsay MacDonald (1932-1935); Stanley Baldwin (1935-1937); Neville Chamberlain (1937-1938)

The Anglo-Irish Trade War (also called the Economic War) was a retaliatory trade war between the Irish Free State and the United Kingdom from 1932 to 1938. The Irish government refused to continue reimbursing Britain with land annuities from financial loans granted to Irish tenant farmers to enable them to purchase lands under the Irish Land Acts in the late nineteenth century, a provision which had been part of the 1921 Anglo-Irish Treaty. This resulted in the imposition of unilateral trade restrictions by both countries.

The "war" had two main aspects:

- Disputes surrounding the changing constitutional status of the Irish Free State vis-à-vis Britain;
- Irish economic and fiscal policy changes following the Great Depression.

== Protective policy ==
On taking over power and coming into office in 1932, the new Fianna Fáil government under Éamon de Valera embarked upon a protectionist policy in economic dealings, and tariffs were introduced for a wide range of imported goods, mainly from Britain, the Free State's largest trading partner by far. This was thought necessary to develop native industry, move away from over-dependence on Britain, and rectify the failure to develop industrially under free market conditions. It was also to compensate for the drastic fall in demand for Irish agricultural products on international markets, due to the Great Depression, which had begun in 1929. Other means also had to be found to help the disastrously undermined trade balance and the mounting national debt. A vigorous campaign was set in motion to make the Free State agriculturally and industrially self-sufficient by the then minister for Industry and Commerce, Seán Lemass. Every effort was taken to add to the measures brought in by the previous government to boost tillage farming and industry and to encourage the population to avoid British imports and "Buy Irish Goods".

== Non-payment of land annuities ==
The government sought to go further and end the repayment to Britain of land annuities. These originated from the government loans granted to Irish tenant farmers by the Land Commission from the 1880s, which had enabled them to purchase lands from their former landlords, under the Irish Land Acts. In 1923, the previous W. T. Cosgrave government had assured Britain that the Free State would honour its debts and hand over the land annuities and other financial liabilities. Under the 1925 London Agreement, the Free State was relieved from its treaty obligation to pay its share towards the public debt of the United Kingdom. The Free State's liability to supervise and pass on land annuities payments led to controversy and debate on whether they were private or public debts. In 1932, de Valera interpreted that the annuities were part of the public debt from which the Free State had been exempted, and decided that the Free State would no longer pay them to Britain. His government passed the Land Act 1933 (No. 38) that allowed the money to be spent on local government projects.

After a series of high-level talks in 1932, discussions broke down in October 1932 on whether the liability to pay the land annuities should be adjudicated by a panel chosen from experts from the British Empire (the British suggestion), or from the whole world (the Irish view). In counterclaim, De Valera required the British to:

- Pay back the £30 million already paid in Land Commission annuities, and
- Pay the Irish Free State £400 million in respect of the British government's supposed overtaxation of Ireland between 1801 and 1922.

== Conflict deepens ==
To recover the annuities, British Prime Minister Ramsay MacDonald retaliated with the imposition of 20% import duty on Free State agricultural products into the UK, which constituted 90% of all Free State exports. UK households were unwilling to pay twenty per cent extra for these food products. The Free State responded in kind by placing a similar duty on British imports and in the case of coal from the UK, with the remarkable slogan (from Jonathan Swift in the 1720s): "Burn everything English except their coal". While the UK was much less affected by the ensuing Economic War, the Irish economy was badly affected.

Internally, the Irish government did not actually end its own collection of annuities that were costing its farmers over £4 million annually. In the background, unemployment was extremely high, the effects of the Great Depression compounded the difficulties, removing the outlet of emigration and reducing remittances from abroad. The government urged people to support the confrontation with Britain as a national hardship to be shared by every citizen. Farmers were urged to turn to tillage to produce enough food for the home market.

The hardship of the Economic War, which particularly affected farmers, was enormous and exacerbated class tensions in the rural Free State. In 1935, a "Coal-Cattle Pact" eased the situation somewhat, whereby Britain agreed to increase its import of Irish cattle by a third in return for the Free State importing more of Britain's coal. As the cattle industry remained in dire straits, the government purchased most of the surplus beef for which it paid bounties for each calf slaughtered as they could not be exported. It introduced a 'free beef for the poor' scheme, the hides finding use only in the tanning and leather industries. For many farmers, especially the larger cattle breeders, the agricultural depression had disastrous consequences. Similar to the "Land War" of the previous century, they refused to pay property rates or pay their land annuities. To recover payments due, the government counteracted by impounding livestock which were quickly auctioned off for less than their value. Farmers campaigned to have these sales boycotted, and blocked roads and railways. Police were called in to protect buyers of the impounded goods and at least one person was killed, for example at the Copley Street riot in Cork, by the so-called "Broy Harriers". The government's senators would not attend a September 1934 Senate debate on the outcome of the incident in Cork.

With farmers having little money to spend, there was a considerable decline in the demand for manufactured goods, so that industries were also affected. The introduction of new import tariffs helped some Irish industries to expand when Lemass introduced the Control of Manufactures Act 1932, whereby the majority ownership of Free State companies was to be limited to Irish citizens. This caused dozens of larger Irish companies with foreign investors, such as Guinness, to relocate their headquarters abroad and pay their corporate taxes there. Additional sugar beet factories were opened at Mallow, Tuam and Thurles. The Economic War did not seriously affect the balance of trade between the two countries because imports from Britain were restricted, but British exporters were very critical of their government due to the loss of business they also suffered in Ireland, by having to pay tariffs on goods they exported there. Both the pressure they exerted on the British government and the discontent of Irish farmers with the Fianna Fáil government helped to encourage both sides to seek settlement of the economic dispute.

== Changes to the Irish constitution and politics ==
In 1933 De Valera removed the Oath of Allegiance (to the Constitution of the Free State and statement of fidelity to George V as "King in Ireland") as required by the 1922 Constitution. In late 1936 he took advantage of the Edward VIII abdication crisis to enact the Executive Authority (External Relations) Act 1936 and the Executive Powers (Consequential Provisions) Act 1937. This had the effect of ending the role of the Governor-General of the Irish Free State in Irish internal affairs, and replacing him with the government of the day.

In 1934-36 the government was concerned at legislative delays caused by the Senate (In Irish: Seanad Éireann), by passing the Constitution (Amendment No. 24) Act 1936. The modern Seanad Éireann was created by the 1937 Constitution, and first sat in January 1939.

Remarkably, despite the general economic hardship, the government vote held up in 1932–1938. Firstly de Valera had called the 1933 election within a year of taking office, before the worst effects had been felt. The July 1937 election saw a drop in support for him, but also for his main rival, the Fine Gael party, and he continued in office with the tacit support of the Labour Party. The number of Dáil seats contested in 1937 had been reduced from 153 to 138 seats, leaving less chance for smaller parties to win seats.

On the same day as the 1937 election the Constitution of Ireland was adopted by a plebiscite, moving the state further away from the constitutional position envisaged by the 1921 Anglo-Irish Treaty. The new Constitution was approved by 56.5% of voters who, because of the high numbers abstaining or spoiling votes, comprised just 38.6% of the whole electorate.

== Coal-Cattle Pact and resolution ==
In 1935 tensions began to ease between Britain and Ireland. With the 20% tax duties on imports, coal and cattle were becoming increasingly harder to buy because of the prices. There was such a surplus of cattle in Ireland that farmers had to begin to slaughter their cattle, because they could not be sold to the British. Britain and Ireland then signed the Coal-Cattle Pact which meant that buying these commodities would be cheaper and easier to get. The Coal-Cattle Pact indicated a willingness to end the Economic War.

The resolution of the crisis came after a series of talks in London between the British Prime Minister Neville Chamberlain and de Valera, who was accompanied by Lemass and James Ryan. An agreement to reach an acceptable settlement was drawn up in 1938, enacted in Britain as the Eire (Confirmation of Agreements) Act. Under the terms of the three-year Anglo-Irish Trade Agreement, all duties imposed during the previous five years were lifted.

Although the period of the Economic War resulted in severe social suffering and heavy financial loss for Ireland, its outcome was publicised as favourable. Ireland was still entitled to impose tariffs on British imports to protect new Irish industries. The treaty also settled the potential £3 million-per-annum land annuities liability by a one-off payment to Britain of £10 million, and a waiver by both sides of all similar claims and counter-claims. As it was known in the 1930s that the Land Annuities payments in Northern Ireland of some £650,000 p.a. were being retained by its government, and not passed on to London, it remains unclear why the Irish government did not mention this in the course of negotiations.

It also included the return to Ireland of the Treaty Ports which had been retained by Britain under a provision of the 1921 Treaty. With the outbreak of World War II in 1939 the return of the ports allowed Ireland to remain neutral.

== Long-term effects ==
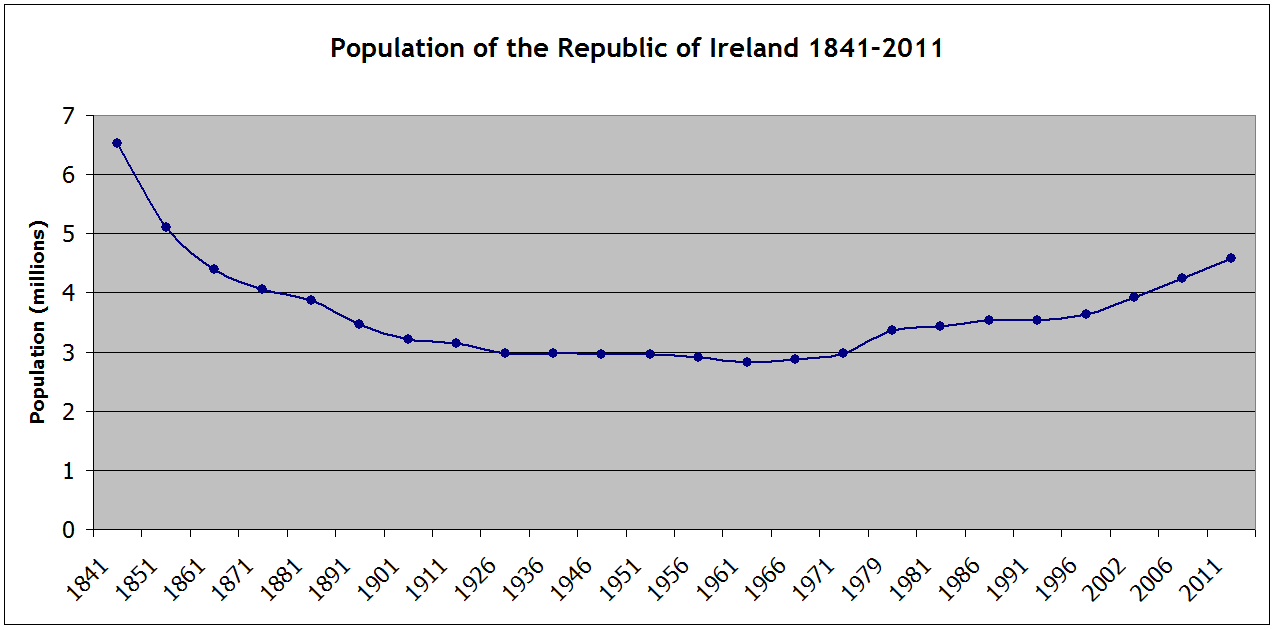
Population (in millions) from 1841 to 2011

Protectionism remained a key element of Irish economic policy into the 1950s, stifling trade and prolonging emigration. Its architect, Seán Lemass, is now best remembered for dismantling and reversing the policy from 1960, advised by T. K. Whitaker's 1958 report "First Programme for Economic Expansion". This then became an important part of Ireland's application for entry into the European Economic Community in 1961 and eventual accession in 1973. The Republic's population rose in the late 1960s for the first time since the Free State's formation in 1922.
