= Unto This Last =

Essay critical of economics by John Ruskin

Unto This Last is an essay critical of economics by John Ruskin, who published the first chapter between August and December 1860 in the monthly journal Cornhill Magazine in four articles. Its stated aim is to define wealth and show that the acquisition of wealth is only possible in a society that values honesty.

== Title ==
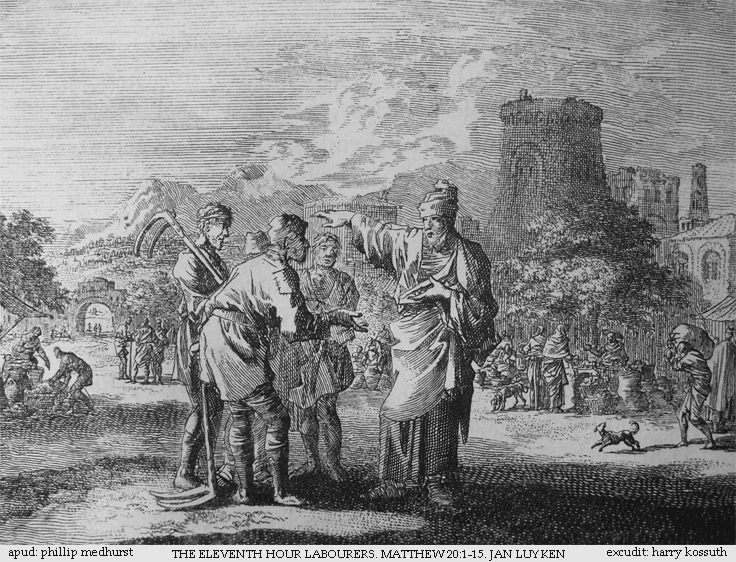
The eleventh hour labourers, etching by Jan Luyken based on the Parable of the Workers in the Vineyard

The title is a quotation from the Parable of the Workers in the Vineyard:

I will give unto this last, even as unto thee. Is it not lawful for me to do what I will with mine own? Is thine eye evil, because I am good? So the last shall be first, and the first last: for many be called, but few chosen.

— Matthew 20 (King James Version)

The "last" are the eleventh hour labourers, who are paid as if they had worked the entire day. Rather than discuss the contemporary religious interpretation of the parable, whereby the eleventh hour labourers would be death-bed converts, or the peoples of the world who come late to religion, Ruskin looks at the social and economic implications, discussing issues such as who should receive a living wage. This essay is very critical of the economists of the 18th and 19th centuries. In this sense, Ruskin is a precursor of social economy. Because the essay also attacks the destructive effects of industrialism upon the natural world, some historians have seen it as anticipating the Green movement.

The essay begins with the following verses, taken from Matthew 20:13 and Zechariah 11:12 respectively (in the King James Version):

Friend, I do thee no wrong.
Didst not thou agree with me for a penny?
Take that thine is, and go thy way.
I will give unto this last even as unto thee.

If ye think good, give me my price;
And if not, forbear.
So they weighed for my price thirty pieces of silver.

== Reception and influence ==
Ruskin says himself that the articles were "very violently criticized", forcing the publisher to stop its publication after four months. Subscribers sent protest letters, but Ruskin countered the attack and published the four articles in a book in May 1862. One of the few that received the book positively was Thomas Carlyle, whom Ruskin said had "led the way" for Unto This Last with his critique of laissez-faire political economy as the "Dismal Science". Carlyle wrote to Ruskin:

I have read your paper with exhilaration, exultation, often with laughter, with bravissimo! Such a thing flung suddenly into half a million dull British heads on the same day, will do a great deal of good. . . . my joy is great to find myself henceforth in a minority of two, at any rate. The Dismal-Science people will object that their science expressly abstracts itself from moralities, from etc., etc.; but what you say and show is incontrovertibly true—that no 'science,' worthy of men (and not worthier of dogs or of devils), has a right to call itself 'political economy,' or can exist at all, except mainly as a fetid nuisance and a public poison, on other terms than those you shadow out to it for the first time.

The book is cited as an inspiration upon the British Labour Party in its initial stages, a survey of Labour Members of Parliament after the party achieved its electoral breakthrough in the 1906 UK general election listing the book as one of their key influences.

=== Mahatma Gandhi's paraphrase ===
Unto This Last had a very important impact on Gandhi's philosophy. He discovered the book in March 1904 through Henry Polak, whom he had met in a vegetarian restaurant in South Africa. Polak was sub-editor of the Johannesburg paper The Critic. Gandhi decided immediately not only to change his own life according to Ruskin's teaching, but also to publish his own newspaper, Indian Opinion, from a farm where everybody would get the same salary, without distinction of function, race, or nationality. This, for that time, was quite revolutionary. Thus Gandhi created Phoenix Settlement.

Gandhi translated Unto This Last into Gujarati in 1908 under the title of Sarvodaya (Well Being of All). Valji Govindji Desai translated it back to English in 1951 under the title of Unto This Last: A Paraphrase. This last essay can be considered his programme on economics, as in Unto This Last, Gandhi found an important part of his social and economic ideas.

== See also ==
- Illth
- Grundrisse
