= Illth =

Word coined by John Ruskin meaning the opposite of wealth

Illth, coined by John Ruskin in the 1860s, is the reverse of wealth in the sense of ill being the opposite of well.

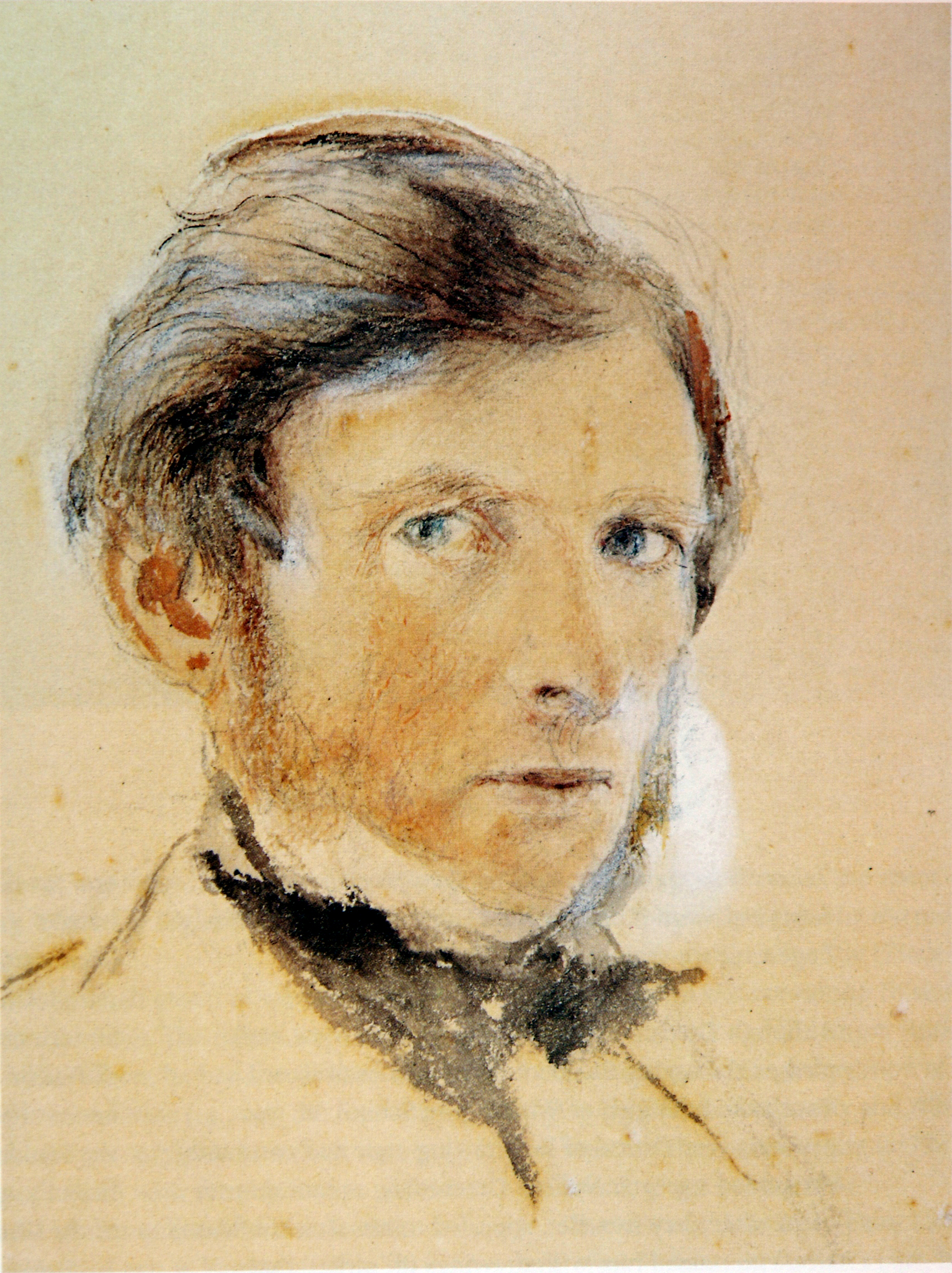
John Ruskin, who coined the term Illth in Unto This Last.

In Ruskin's view:

Wealth, therefore, is "The possession of the valuable by the valiant"; and in considering it as a power existing in a nation, the two elements, the value of the thing, and the valour of its possessor, must be estimated together. Whence it appears that many of the persons commonly considered wealthy, are in reality no more wealthy than the locks of their own strong boxes are, they being inherently and eternally incapable of wealth; and operating for the nation, in an economical point of view, either as pools of dead water, and eddies in a stream (which, so long as the stream flows, are useless, or serve only to drown people, but may become of importance in a state of stagnation should the stream dry); or else, as dams in a river, of which the ultimate service depends not on the dam, but the miller; or else, as mere accidental stays and impediments, acting not as wealth, but (for we ought to have a correspondent term) as "illth" causing various devastation and trouble around them in all directions; or lastly, act not at all, but are merely animated conditions of delay, (no use being possible of anything they have until they are dead,) in which last condition they are nevertheless often useful as delays, and "impedimenta," if a nation is apt to move too fast. (Unto This Last, Essay IV, p. 182, 1860)

Various other writers have used the term, and continue to do so. A notable example is George Bernard Shaw, who used illth as a subheading in an 1889 essay.

In the context of modern economic theory and practice, the term has been central to the work of Herman Daly and his advocacy for a steady-state economy.

== See also ==
- Dismal Science
