= Gay science =

Gay science may refer to:

- Queer studies, the study of topics relating to sexual orientation and gender identity
- Gay Science, a 1997 book by Timothy F. Murphy
- The Gay Science, a 1882 book by Friedrich Nietzsche
- A historical term for poetry, contrasted with "the dismal science" of economics
