= The dismal science =

Derogatory name for economics

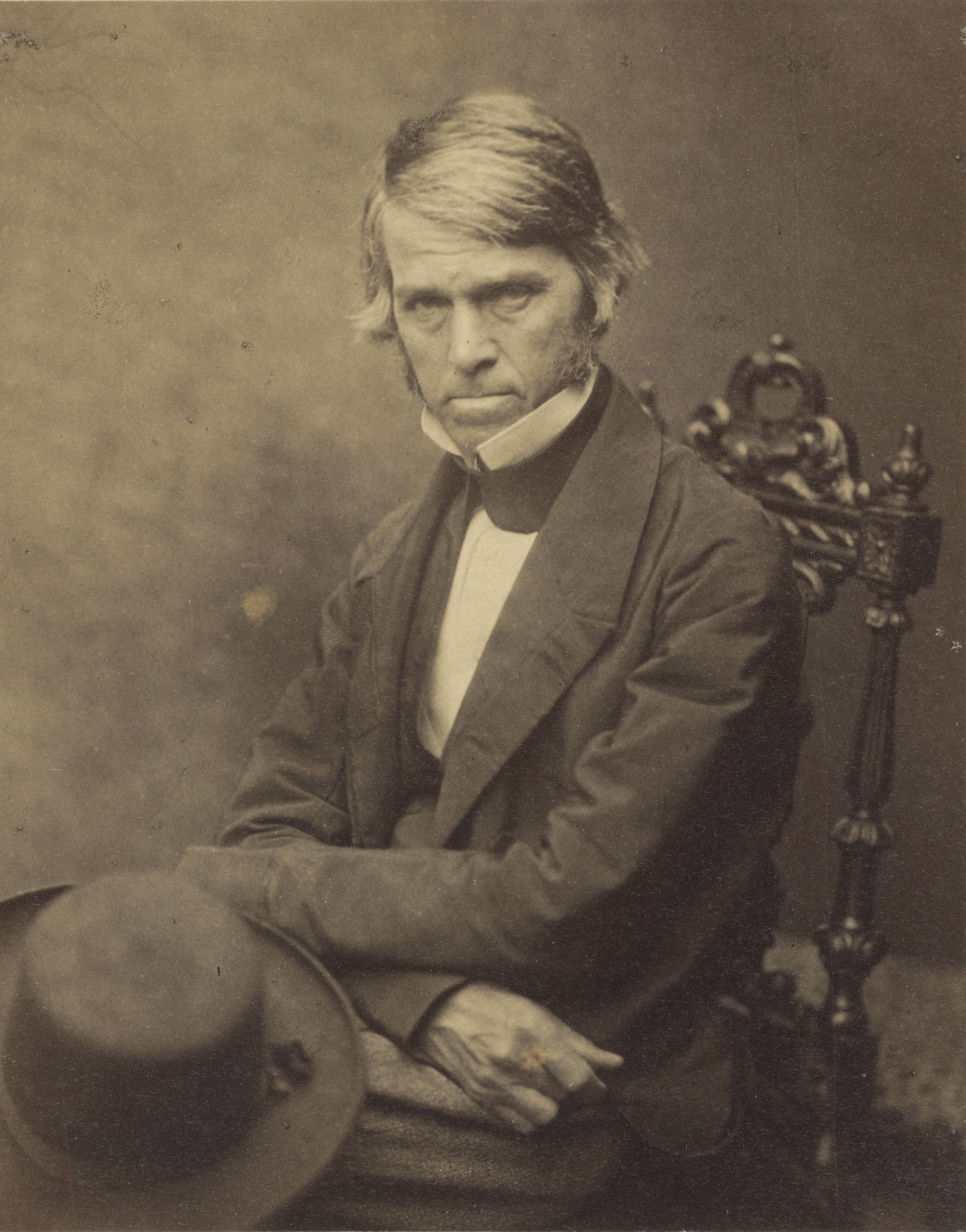
Thomas Carlyle (1854)

"The dismal science" is a derogatory name for the science of economics, coined by Scottish essayist Thomas Carlyle in 1849. It contrasts with "the gay science", a then-current name for poetry.

== Origin ==
The phrase first appeared in "Occasional Discourse on the Negro Question" (1849), in which Carlyle claimed that emancipation had wrecked the economy of the West Indies by putting blacks in a position to demand unaffordable wages, thus depriving plantation owners of their labour supply. He argued for a return to some kind of forced labour system, albeit one more just than slavery. Economists of the time, following the principle of supply and demand, claimed that the labour problem could be resolved by opening the West Indies to African immigration, but Carlyle viewed this proposal with scorn, believing that it would lead to the development of "black Irelands" (i.e. impoverished, overpopulated islands liable to suffer terrible famines whenever crops failed). His contempt both for economists and the "Exeter Hall philanthropists" who had spearheaded emancipation moved him to write:

Truly, my philanthropic friends, Exeter Hall Philanthropy is wonderful; and the Social Science—not a "gay science", but a rueful—which finds the secret of this universe in "supply-and-demand", and reduces the duty of human governors to that of letting men alone, is also wonderful. Not a "gay science", I should say, like some we have heard of; no, a dreary, desolate and, indeed, quite abject and distressing one; what we might call, by way of eminence, the dismal science.

Carlyle had expressed similar sentiments regarding the theories of Malthus in Chartism (1840):

The controversies on Malthus and the "Population Principle", "Preventive check" and so forth, with which the public ear has been deafened for a long while, are indeed sufficiently mournful. Dreary, stolid, dismal, without hope for this world or the next, is all that of the preventive check and the denial of the preventive check.

Amongst those who were influenced by Carlyle's assessment was John Ruskin, who wrote that Carlyle had "led the way" for his own critique of political economy in Unto This Last (1860).

== Beyond Carlyle ==
Many at the time and afterward have understood the phrase in relation to the grim predictions drawn from the principles of 19th-century political economy. According to Humphry House:

Carlyle's phrase, "the dismal science", has been so often quoted, that there is a risk of thinking that the opinion behind it was confined to him and his followers; but the opinion was widespread, and thought to be a justifiable inference from the works of the economists: "No one", said J. E. Cairnes, "can have studied political economy in the works of its earlier cultivators without being struck with the dreariness of the outlook which, in the main, it discloses for the human race. It seems to have been Ricardo's deliberate opinion that a substantial improvement in the condition of the mass of mankind was impossible." It is not merely that the Malthusian principle of population and the doctrine that wages must normally and necessarily fall to the minimum point were gladly accepted by wicked exploiters as the justification of their profits; but thousands whose immediate interests were not touched by these beliefs found it difficult to avoid them. [...] Malthus hung over England like a cloud. It is difficult now to realize what it meant to thousands of good and sensible men that they believed his principle of population to be exactly true—believed that as poverty was relieved and the standard of life raised, so surely there would be bred a new race hovering on the misery-line, on the edge of starvation. However they might wish it false, they feared it true[.]

In modern discourse, the term can refer to the fact that economics invariably involves the study of scarcity, conflict, and trade-offs, leading to conclusions and policy recommendations that may highlight limitations and negative aspects of human behavior and societal organization.

== See also ==
- An Essay on the Principle of Population
- Critique of political economy
- Illth – a term of Ruskin's used to contrast the "wealth" that could be created by government with the "anarchy" created by laissez-faire
- Malthusian growth model
- Malthusianism
