= Occasional Discourse on the Negro Question =

Essay by Thomas Carlyle

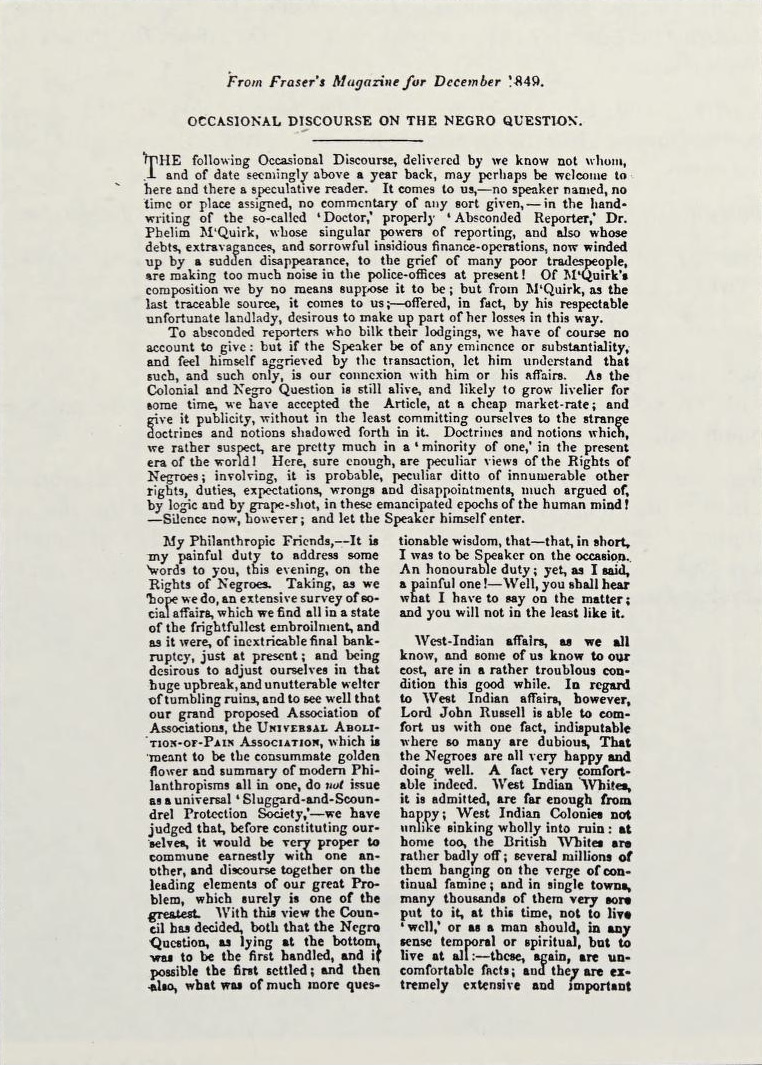
- First separate edition, privately printed
- Author: Thomas Carlyle
- Language: English
- Publisher: Fraser's Magazine
- Publication date: December 1849
- Publication place: England
- Media type: Pamphlet

"Occasional Discourse on the Negro Question" is an essay by the Scottish essayist Thomas Carlyle. It was first published anonymously in Fraser's Magazine for Town and Country of London in December 1849, and was revised and reprinted in 1853 as a pamphlet entitled "Occasional Discourse on the Nigger Question". The essay was the spark of a debate between Carlyle and John Stuart Mill. It was in this essay that Carlyle first introduced the phrase "the dismal science" to characterize the field of economics.

== Origins ==
The article began as a devil's advocate work with the aim of challenging what Carlyle perceived to be a hypocritical movement for the abolition of slavery in Britain. Although the slave trade had been abolished by 1807, and slavery in the British Empire by 1833, nations such as the United States, Cuba and Brazil continued to legally allow slavery. In its original publication, Carlyle presented it as a speech "delivered by we know not whom" written down by an unreliable reporter by the name of "Phelin M'Quirk" (the fictitious "Absconded Reporter"). The manuscript was supposedly sold to the publisher by M'Quirk's landlady in lieu of unpaid rent – she found it lying in his room after he ran off.

In its 1849 publication, a fictitious speaker makes various controversial points ranging from derogatory comments concerning the appearance and intelligence of black people to radical alternative solutions to the issue of slavery. These opinions had probably been gathered from his proslavery friends, including several who had spent time in the West Indies, such as his friend and fellow Scotsman John Sterling, all fused into one. The speaker suggests that the conditions on most slave ships are not nearly as awful as have been widely reported, and that many other countries are still involved in the slave trade, and that trying to stop the trade would be impossible. Additionally, he proposes that rather than simply setting the enslaved free, into a world of which they have little understanding, enslavers should be obliged to look after them like members of their families, by caring for them into old age.

Throughout the delivery of the speech to the public, M'Quirk reports that members of the audience got up and left in disgust, suggesting how Carlyle expected the essay would be received. Just as he had expected, the work met with widespread disapproval, and in the minds of many people, Carlyle's reputation was forever tarnished. Carlyle's closest friends criticized him for his stand, but rather than back down he grew contrary and isolated. In later publications, the M'Quirk framework was entirely omitted, and Carlyle expressed the opinions as if they were his own.

== Debate with John Stuart Mill ==
John Stuart Mill's reply, in the next issue of Fraser's Magazine, under the title, "The Negro question" was also published anonymously. Mill criticised Carlyle's view of human nature, the poor, and the existing power structure's complicity in societal wealth inequality. He argued that any supposedly self-defeating actions are explained by class oppression.

== See also ==
- An American Dilemma: The Negro Problem and Modern Democracy
- The Race Question
