= Anglo-Irish Trade Agreement =

1938 agreement between the United Kingdom and Ireland

The Anglo-Irish Trade Agreement was signed on 25 April 1938 by Ireland and the United Kingdom. It aimed to resolve the Anglo-Irish Trade War which had been on-going from 1933.

== Scope ==
The prime minister Neville Chamberlain summarised the 4 possible areas for discussion in a debate on the Eire Bill held on 5 May 1938: "The first was the question of partition; the second, of defence; the third, finance; and the fourth, trade."

Partition was considered by him to be a matter to be resolved between Ireland and Northern Ireland.

Chamberlain summed up that: "In spite of all the controversies of the past and all the heat that has been generated, this country and Eire cannot do without one another. Our natural interests and our geographical position inevitably tend to bring us together, and what has kept us apart has been, not a divergence of interests, but something which ought to be far less important, and that is a difference of opinion."

== Terms of the Agreement ==
The treaty abolished the 20% tariffs that both the United Kingdom and Ireland placed on their respective imported goods.

Ireland was also to pay a final one time £10 million sum to the United Kingdom for the "land annuities" derived from financial loans originally granted to Irish tenant farmers by the British government to enable them purchase lands under the Land Acts pre-1922, a provision which was part of the 1921 Anglo-Irish Treaty (to compensate Anglo-Irish land-owners for compulsory purchase of their lands in Ireland mainly through the Land Acts introduced by governments of the United Kingdom between 1870 and 1909).

The Trade Agreement was portrayed as advantageous for the newly reconstituted Irish state, as the remaining land annuities liability under a 1925 agreement was £11.75 million (in annual repayments of £250,000 over sixty years). The apparently favourable saving of £1,175,000 was made much of on the Irish side, but more than matched what the British would have gradually lost over the 47 years, if the value was discounted on the Time value of money basis. It was convenient for both sides to close the matter.

The United Kingdom also transferred to the government of Ireland the Treaty Ports (Queenstown (Cobh), Berehaven and Lough Swilly). The use of these ports had been retained by the United Kingdom under the Anglo-Irish Treaty that ended the Anglo-Irish War.

The Trade Agreement, including the return of the Treaty Ports, was given effect in the United Kingdom through the Eire (Confirmation of Agreements) Act 1938.
