= Eire (Confirmation of Agreements) Act 1938 =

Act of the Parliament of the United Kingdom

Eire (Confirmation of Agreements) Act 1938 (Note: Section 4.)
- Act of Parliament
- Parliament of the United Kingdom
- Long title: An Act to confirm and give effect to certain agreements as to the relations between the United Kingdom and Eire.
- Citation: 1 & 2 Geo. 6. c. 25
- Territorial extent: United Kingdom

Dates
- Royal assent: 17 May 1938
- Commencement: 17 May 1938 (Note: The Acts of Parliament (Commencement) Act 1793.)
- Repealed: 21 May 1981
Other legislation
Amends	Public Works Loans Act 1927; Ottawa Agreements Act 1932
Repeals/revokes	Irish Free State (Special Duties) Act 1932
Amended by	National Loans Act 1968; Statute Law (Repeals) Act 1975
Repealed by	Statute Law (Repeals) Act 1981

Status: Repealed

Text of statute as originally enacted

The Eire (Confirmation of Agreements) Act 1938 (1 & 2 Geo. 6. c. 25) was an act of the Parliament of the United Kingdom passed on 17 May 1938. It was the British implementing measure for the 1938 Anglo-Irish Agreements which were signed at London on 25 April 1938 by the governments of Ireland and the United Kingdom. There were three agreements in total: one to rescind Articles 6 and 7 of the Anglo-Irish Treaty and the transfer of British Admiralty property to Ireland; a second for the settlement of outstanding financial claims against the Irish Government; and the third, an important trade agreement putting an end to an "economic war" between the two countries.

== Implementation of the agreements ==
In accordance with the earlier agreements, the act:

- rescinded Articles 6 and 7 of the 1921 Treaty and returned certain British Admiralty property, commonly known as the Treaty Ports, to Ireland.
- put into force a range of free trade provisions ending what had been an economic war between Ireland and the United Kingdom.

== Name of the Irish state ==
The act also gave partial recognition for the purposes of domestic British law to the change of the formal name of the Irish state under the 1937 Constitution of Ireland; the Irish state had formerly been known as the "Irish Free State". Under the act the British Government decided to refer to the Irish state only as "Eire" (without the correct síneadh fada or acute accent), and not as "Ireland" (the state's name in English under the Constitution of Ireland). This avoided any need for the British government to refer to the Irish state as "Ireland", thus side-stepping concerns over the status of Northern Ireland. Under Section 1 of the act, it was declared that (for the purposes of United Kingdom legislation) the territory "which was ... known as Irish Free State shall be styled as...Eire".

The English-law name of the state was later changed to "Republic of Ireland" by the Ireland Act 1949.

== Other effects ==
The act came into effect on 19 May 1938 pursuant to a Treasury order. One of the act's effects was to throw into doubt whether Irish citizens were still British subjects. Legal arguments were raised that as the Constitution of Ireland declared Ireland a sovereign independent state, the passing of the act which recognised one of the Irish state’s constitutional names, also recognised its sovereignty. Notably, these arguments were raised in the Murray v Parkes case, 1942.

== Subsequent developments ==
The whole act was repealed by section 1(1) of, and part V of schedule 1 to, the Statute Law (Repeals) Act 1981, which came into force on 21 May 1981.

== See also ==
- Anglo-Irish Trade Agreement
- Anglo-Irish Treaty
- Names of the Irish state
- Treaty Ports (Ireland)
