= Fianna Fáil leadership election =

Fianna Fáil leadership election may refer to:

- 1959 Fianna Fáil leadership election
- 1966 Fianna Fáil leadership election
- 1979 Fianna Fáil leadership election
- 1992 Fianna Fáil leadership election
- 1994 Fianna Fáil leadership election
- 2008 Fianna Fáil leadership election
- 2011 Fianna Fáil leadership election
