= Leader of Fianna Fáil =

Irish political party leadership

- Incumbent; Micheál Martin since 26 January 2011
- Type: Party leader
- Inaugural holder: Éamon de Valera
- Formation: 23 March 1926
- Deputy: Jack Chambers
- Website: Micheál Martin, TD

The leader of Fianna Fáil is the most senior politician within the Fianna Fáil political party in Ireland. Since 26 January 2011, the office has been held by Micheál Martin, following the resignation of Brian Cowen as leader of the party four days earlier.

== Background ==
The post of leader of Fianna Fáil was officially created in 1926 when Éamon de Valera founded the party. De Valera had previously been leader of Sinn Féin and took the Anti-Treaty side during the Civil War. The new party essentially absorbed most of Sinn Féin's parliamentary talent; most Sinn Féin TDs who had become disillusioned with the party's abstentionist policy from Dáil Éireann and wanted to republicanise the Irish Free State from within.

Like other Irish political parties, most notably Fine Gael, the leader of Fianna Fáil has the power to dismiss or appoint their deputy and to dismiss or appoint parliamentary party members to front bench positions.

When Fianna Fáil is in opposition the leader usually acts as the Leader of the Opposition, and chairs the opposition front bench. Concordantly, when the party is in government, the leader would usually become Taoiseach, as well as appointing the cabinet.

All eight leaders of Fianna Fáil have served as head of government. Éamon de Valera became the first, when he was elected President of the Executive Council in 1932. He became Taoiseach with the adoption of the current Constitution in 1937. He remained as leader of Fianna Fáil until 1959, when he retired after serving 21 years as head of government over three separate stints and after leading the party to eight general election triumphs. Seán Lemass was the unanimous choice to succeed de Valera as leader of Fianna Fáil and Taoiseach that year. He served seven years in both roles before handing over to Jack Lynch in 1966, following the first contested leadership election in the history of the party. Lynch served as party leader for thirteen years until 1979, nine of which were spent as Taoiseach. His resignation sparked another leadership election, which saw Charles Haughey emerge as Taoiseach and leader of a deeply divided party. His thirteen-year period in charge saw many heaves against his leadership from within the party, with the final challenge hastening his resignation in 1992.

That year, three candidates expressed an interest in seeking the leadership; however, Albert Reynolds was the overwhelming favourite in the subsequent leadership election and was elected Taoiseach and party leader. After just over two years in office, Reynolds was forced to resign in 1994. His successor was Bertie Ahern who, after being the unopposed candidate for the position of leader, was forced into opposition. Ahern went on to become the most popular leader of Fianna Fáil in the modern era, guiding the party to three successive election wins and serving almost eleven consecutive years as Taoiseach. His resignation in 2008 saw Brian Cowen take on the dual roles of Taoiseach and party leader, following an unopposed election. Cowen's tenure was characterised by a downturn in the economy, and he was effectively forced to resign as party leader in 2011 while remaining as Taoiseach. Four candidates put their names forward in the subsequent leadership election, with former Foreign Minister Micheál Martin becoming the eighth leader of the party.

Micheál Martin first served as Leader of the Opposition from 2011 until 2020. He led the party into two elections before being elected Taoiseach of a three party coalition government between Fianna Fáil, Fine Gael and the Green Party following the 2020 general election where no party won an outright majority. He served as Taoiseach until 17 December 2022, where the positions of Taoiseach and Tánaiste rotated as part of an agreed cabinet reshuffle where he became Tánaiste while Leo Varadkar, leader of Fine Gael, succeeded him as Taoiseach. Martin again became Taoiseach on 23 January 2025 following the 2024 general election, and an agreement between Fianna Fáil, Fine Gael and several independent TDs.

== Leaders ==
No.	Name	Portrait	Constituency	Term of Office		Taoiseach
1	Éamon de Valera		Clare	23 March 1926	23 June 1959	W. T. Cosgrave (1922–1932)
1	Éamon de Valera		Clare	23 March 1926	23 June 1959	Éamon de Valera (1932–1948)
1	Éamon de Valera		Clare	23 March 1926	23 June 1959	John A. Costello (1948–1951)
1	Éamon de Valera		Clare	23 March 1926	23 June 1959	Éamon de Valera (1951–1954)
1	Éamon de Valera		Clare	23 March 1926	23 June 1959	John A. Costello (1954–1957)
1	Éamon de Valera		Clare	23 March 1926	23 June 1959	Éamon de Valera (1957–1959)
2	Seán Lemass		Dublin South-Central	23 June 1959 (leadership election)	10 November 1966	Seán Lemass (1959–1966)
3	Jack Lynch		Cork Borough (1948–1969); Cork City North-West (1969–1977); Cork City (1977–1981)	10 November 1966 (leadership election)	7 December 1979	Jack Lynch (1966–1973)
3	Jack Lynch		Cork Borough (1948–1969); Cork City North-West (1969–1977); Cork City (1977–1981)	10 November 1966 (leadership election)	7 December 1979	Liam Cosgrave (1973–1977)
3	Jack Lynch		Cork Borough (1948–1969); Cork City North-West (1969–1977); Cork City (1977–1981)	10 November 1966 (leadership election)	7 December 1979	Jack Lynch (1977–1979)
4	Charles Haughey		Dublin North-East (1957–1977); Dublin Artane (1977–1981); Dublin North-Central (1981–1992)	7 December 1979 (leadership election)	6 February 1992	Charles Haughey (1979–1981)
4	Charles Haughey		Dublin North-East (1957–1977); Dublin Artane (1977–1981); Dublin North-Central (1981–1992)	7 December 1979 (leadership election)	6 February 1992	Garret FitzGerald (1981–1982)
4	Charles Haughey		Dublin North-East (1957–1977); Dublin Artane (1977–1981); Dublin North-Central (1981–1992)	7 December 1979 (leadership election)	6 February 1992	Charles Haughey (1982)
4	Charles Haughey		Dublin North-East (1957–1977); Dublin Artane (1977–1981); Dublin North-Central (1981–1992)	7 December 1979 (leadership election)	6 February 1992	Garret FitzGerald (1982–1987)
4	Charles Haughey		Dublin North-East (1957–1977); Dublin Artane (1977–1981); Dublin North-Central (1981–1992)	7 December 1979 (leadership election)	6 February 1992	Charles Haughey (1987–1992)
5	Albert Reynolds		Longford–Westmeath	6 February 1992 (leadership election)	19 December 1994	Albert Reynolds (1992–1994)
6	Bertie Ahern		Dublin Central	19 December 1994 (leadership election)	7 May 2008	John Bruton (1994–1997)
6	Bertie Ahern		Dublin Central	19 December 1994 (leadership election)	7 May 2008	Bertie Ahern (1997–2008)
7	Brian Cowen		Laois–Offaly	7 May 2008 (leadership election)	22 January 2011	Brian Cowen (2008–2011)
8	Micheál Martin		Cork South-Central	26 January 2011 (leadership election)	Incumbent	Brian Cowen (2008–2011)
8	Micheál Martin		Cork South-Central	26 January 2011 (leadership election)	Incumbent	Enda Kenny (2011–2017)
8	Micheál Martin		Cork South-Central	26 January 2011 (leadership election)	Incumbent	Leo Varadkar (2017–2020)
8	Micheál Martin		Cork South-Central	26 January 2011 (leadership election)	Incumbent	Micheál Martin (2020–2022)
8	Micheál Martin		Cork South-Central	26 January 2011 (leadership election)	Incumbent	Leo Varadkar (2022–2024)
8	Micheál Martin		Cork South-Central	26 January 2011 (leadership election)	Incumbent	Simon Harris (2024–2025)
8	Micheál Martin		Cork South-Central	26 January 2011 (leadership election)	Incumbent	Micheál Martin (2025–present)

== Deputy leaders ==
The deputy leader of Fianna Fáil is usually a senior politician within Fianna Fáil. Like other political party leaders, the leader of Fianna Fáil has the power to appoint or dismiss their deputy. The position is not an elected one and is largely honorific.

The office of Tánaiste has been held by senior politicians in the main governing party. Previous Fianna Fáil deputy leaders, including Brian Cowen and Mary Coughlan, held this post from 2007 to 2011. However, the deputy leader is essentially a party official and there is no constitutional link between the two roles.

Fianna Fáil did not have a deputy leader from the reshuffle in 2012 until the reshuffle in 2018. Following the resignation of Dara Calleary in August 2020, the position of deputy leader remained vacant until Jack Chambers was appointed in June 2024.

Name	Portrait	Constituency	Term of Office		Office(s) held
Joseph Brennan		Donegal–Leitrim	1973	5 July 1977	
George Colley		Dublin Central	5 July 1977	1982	Tánaiste; Minister for Finance Minister for the Public Service; Minister for Tourism and Transport; Minister for Energy
Ray MacSharry		Sligo–Leitrim	1982	1983	Tánaiste; Minister for Finance
Brian Lenihan Snr		Dublin West	1983	1990	Tánaiste; Minister for Foreign Affairs; Minister for Defence
John Wilson		Cavan	1990	1992	Tánaiste; Minister for the Marine; Minister for the Gaeltacht; Minister for Defence
Bertie Ahern		Dublin Central	1992	1994	Minister for Finance; Minister for Arts, Culture and the Gaeltacht; Tánaiste
Mary O'Rourke		Longford–Westmeath	16 January 1995	28 July 2002	Minister for Public Enterprise
Brian Cowen		Laois–Offaly	28 July 2002	7 May 2008	Minister for Foreign Affairs; Minister for Finance; Tánaiste
Mary Coughlan		Donegal South-West	7 May 2008	31 January 2011	Tánaiste; Minister for Enterprise, Trade and Employment; Minister for Education and Skills; Minister for Health
Mary Hanafin		Dún Laoghaire	31 January 2011	15 March 2011	Minister for Tourism, Culture and Sport; Minister for Enterprise, Trade and Innovation
Brian Lenihan Jnr		Dublin West	15 March 2011	10 June 2011	
Éamon Ó Cuív		Galway West	4 August 2011	29 February 2012	
Dara Calleary		Mayo	29 March 2018	24 August 2020	Government Chief Whip; Minister for Agriculture, Food and the Marine
Jack Chambers		Dublin West	19 June 2024	Incumbent	Minister of State for International Road Transport, Logistics; and Postal Policy; Minister for Finance; Minister for Public Expenditure, Infrastructure, Public Service Reform and Digitalisation

== Rank by time in office ==
Rank	Leader	Time in office
1	Éamon de Valera	33 years, 92 days
2	Micheál Martin	15 years, 284 days
3	Bertie Ahern	13 years, 140 days
4	Jack Lynch	13 years, 27 days
5	Charles Haughey	12 years, 61 days
6	Seán Lemass	6 years, 193 days
7	Albert Reynolds	2 years, 316 days
8	Brian Cowen	2 years, 260 days

== See also ==
- History of Fianna Fáil
- Leader of Fine Gael
- Leader of the Labour Party (Ireland)
- Leader of Sinn Féin
