= History of Fianna Fáil =

Irish political party history (1926–pres.)

The Irish political party Fianna Fáil was founded on 16 May 1926 at a public meeting at the La Scala Theatre on Prince's Street (now O'Connell Street) in Dublin., with Éamon de Valera as its first president. Organizing took place two months after de Valera and other deputies in the Dáil Éireann deputies, decided to split from the original Sinn Féin. This happened because de Valera's motion calling for elected members be allowed to take their seats in the Dáil, if and when the controversial Oath of Allegiance was removed, failed to pass at the Sinn Féin Ard Fheis on 11 March 1926, and De Valera resigned as the Sinn Féin chairman. The new party adopted its name on 2 April of the same year. From the formation of the first Fianna Fáil government on 9 March 1932 until the 2011 general election, the party was in power for 61 of 79 years. Its longest continuous period in office was 15 years and 11 months (March 1932–February 1948). Its single longest period out of office, in that time, has been four years and four months (March 1973–July 1977). All eight of its party's leaders have served as Taoiseach. It was the largest party in Dáil Éireann at every general election from the 1932 general election until the 2011 general election, when it suffered the worst defeat of a sitting government in the history of the Irish state.

== Founding ==
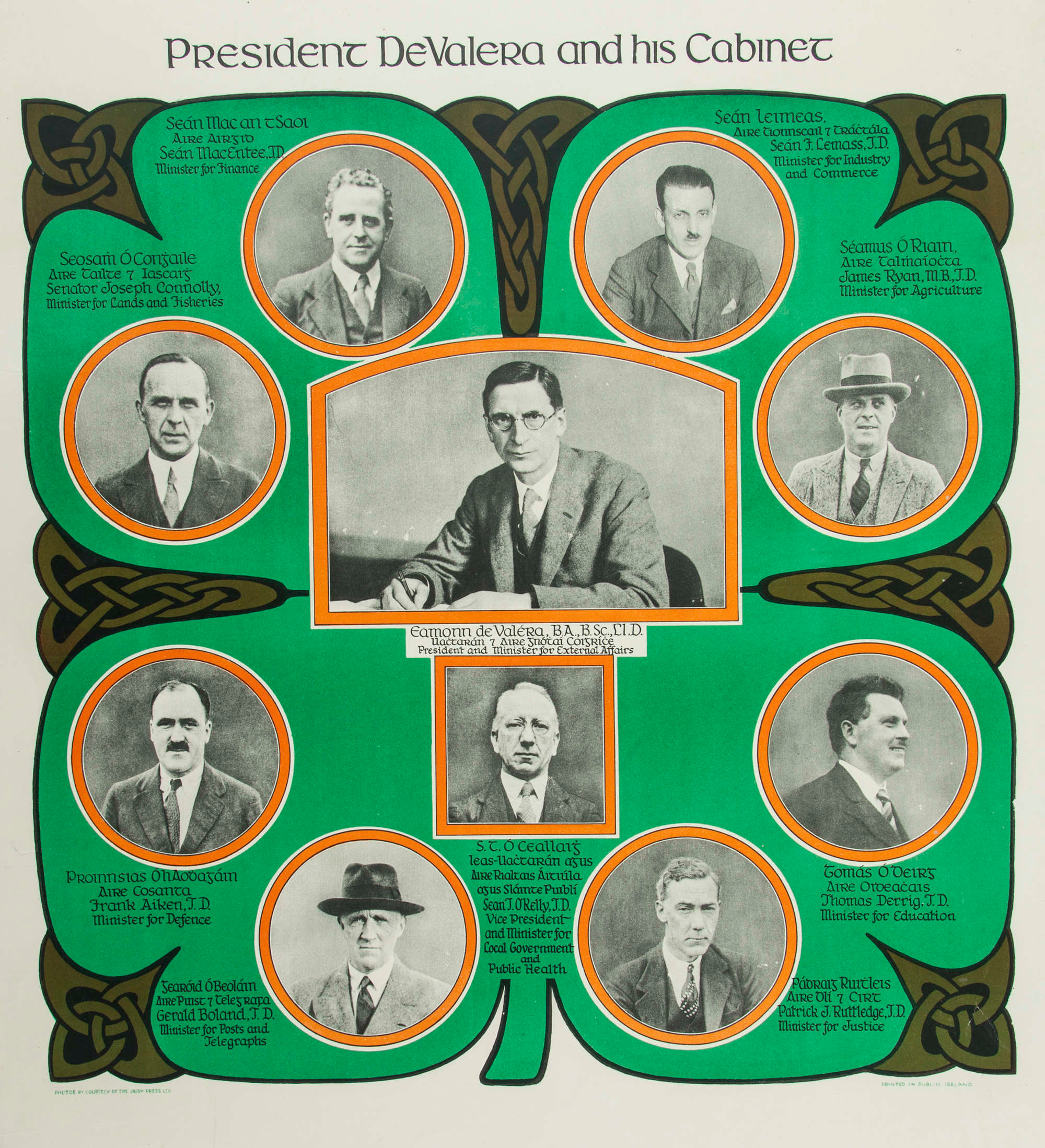
De Valera's cabinet in 1932, featuring many of the founding members of Fianna Fáil

The Fianna Fáil Party was founded by Éamon de Valera former Príomh Aire (prime minister & president of Dáil Éireann (April 1919–August 1921)) and President of the Republic (August 1921–January 1922) when he and a number of other members split from Sinn Féin. Other founding members included Seán Lemass (who became its second leader), Seán T. O'Kelly, P. J. Ruttledge and others, including the 1916 veterans Gerald Boland and Constance Markievicz, who chaired the inaugural meeting at the La Scala Theatre in O'Connell Street, Dublin. Though Fianna Fáil was also opposed to the Treaty settlement, it adopted a different approach of aiming to republicanise the Irish Free State. As far as the party's economic policies are concerned, Fianna Fáil's platform of economic autarky had appeal among the farmers, working-class people and the poor, whilst initially alienating more affluent classes.

== De Valera (1926–59) ==
In the June 1927 election Fianna Fáil did well in western Ireland and in the working class districts of Dublin. After the election Fianna Fáil initially refused to enter the Irish Free State's Dáil Éireann in protest at the Oath of Allegiance which all members of the Dáil were obliged to take. The oath, which was contained in the Anglo-Irish Treaty of 1921, was drafted by Michael Collins, using phraseology taken from the Irish Republican Brotherhood's oath and suggestions from de Valera, then President of the Republic. In its final form, it promised "allegiance" to "The Irish Free State" and "that I will be faithful" to King George V in his role as King of Ireland, "in virtue of the common citizenship". The party initially took a court case on the issue of the oath. However the assassination of the Cumann na nGaedheal Minister for Justice, Kevin O'Higgins, led the then government to introduce a new bill, requiring all candidates to swear that they would take the oath if elected. (If they declined to give that guarantee, they would be ineligible to be candidates in any election.) Fianna Fáil abandoned its previous refusal to take the oath, dismissed it as an "empty formula", and entered the Dáil. Between the June 1927 election and the 1932 general election de Valera founded The Irish Press.

On 9 March 1932 Éamon de Valera was elected President of the Executive Council of the Irish Free State. He would be prime minister (titled as President of the Executive Council until 1937 and as Taoiseach after 1937) for 21 years, the first 16 of which were uninterrupted. The ban on the Irish Republican Army (IRA) was lifted, the Oath of Allegiance to the British Crown was abolished and the office of Governor-General was greatly demoted. During his first term de Valera weakened the links between the Free State and Britain. The relations with the United Kingdom rapidly deteriorated. De Valera also started an economic war with Britain, the country's largest trading partner, by withholding land annuity payments though the Irish Government did not actually end its own collection of annuities that were costing its farmers over £4 million annually. High tariffs were placed on British imports and the British responded by placing tariffs on Irish goods such as agricultural produce. This "tit for tat" policy was disastrous for the Irish economy with the impact of the Great Depression compounding the difficulties, removing the outlet of emigration from Ireland and reducing remittances from abroad. The government urged people to support the confrontation with Britain as a national hardship to be shared by every citizen and it would last until 1938 when the Anglo-Irish Free Trade Agreement was signed.

In May 1936 de Valera abolished Seanad Éireann (Irish Free State). At that time he also announced his intention to draw up a new constitution. On 1 July 1937 the Irish people adopted the new Constitution of Ireland. This new constitution was republican in all but name. The constitution claimed that the state consisted of the entire island of Ireland and the office of Governor-General was replaced by the President of Ireland. De Valera was able to succeed with this tactic as the 1930s had seen a change in Britain's relationship with Ireland. In 1931, the Statute of Westminster had all but abolished Westminster's right to legislate for the Free State, effectively granting it internationally recognised independence. Thus, the Houses of Commons/Lords no longer had a role in turning National bills into Law. It was a delicate political move but one which de Valera managed to execute without major disruption.

In 1939 at the outbreak of World War II de Valera announced that Ireland would remain neutral. Fine Gael TD James Dillon was alone in advocating an alliance with the United Kingdom. This policy infuriated the British; however, Ireland's neutrality strongly favoured the Allies. Controversially, de Valera formally offered his condolences to the German Minister in Dublin on the death of Adolf Hitler in 1945, in accordance with diplomatic protocol.

After de Valera had spent sixteen years in power—without answering the crucial questions of partition and republican status—the public demanded a change from Fianna Fáil government. In the 1948 election, de Valera lost the outright majority he'd enjoyed since 1933. De Valera refused to enter a coalition, and was consigned to opposition when the other parties banded together to form the First Inter-Party Government. He returned in 1951, but no new ideas emerged from the Cabinet. Seán Lemass was eager to launch a new economic policy but the conservative elements in the government prevailed. Fianna Fáil lost power again in 1954. In 1957 de Valera returned for the final time as Taoiseach. At this stage he was 75 years old and almost blind. However, he allowed Lemass to proceed with his economic expansion plan the 'Programme for Economic Expansion' of 1958. He won the presidential election on 17 June 1959 and resigned as Taoiseach, leader of Fianna Fáil and TD for Clare six days later, handing over power to Seán Lemass.

== Lemass (1959–66) ==
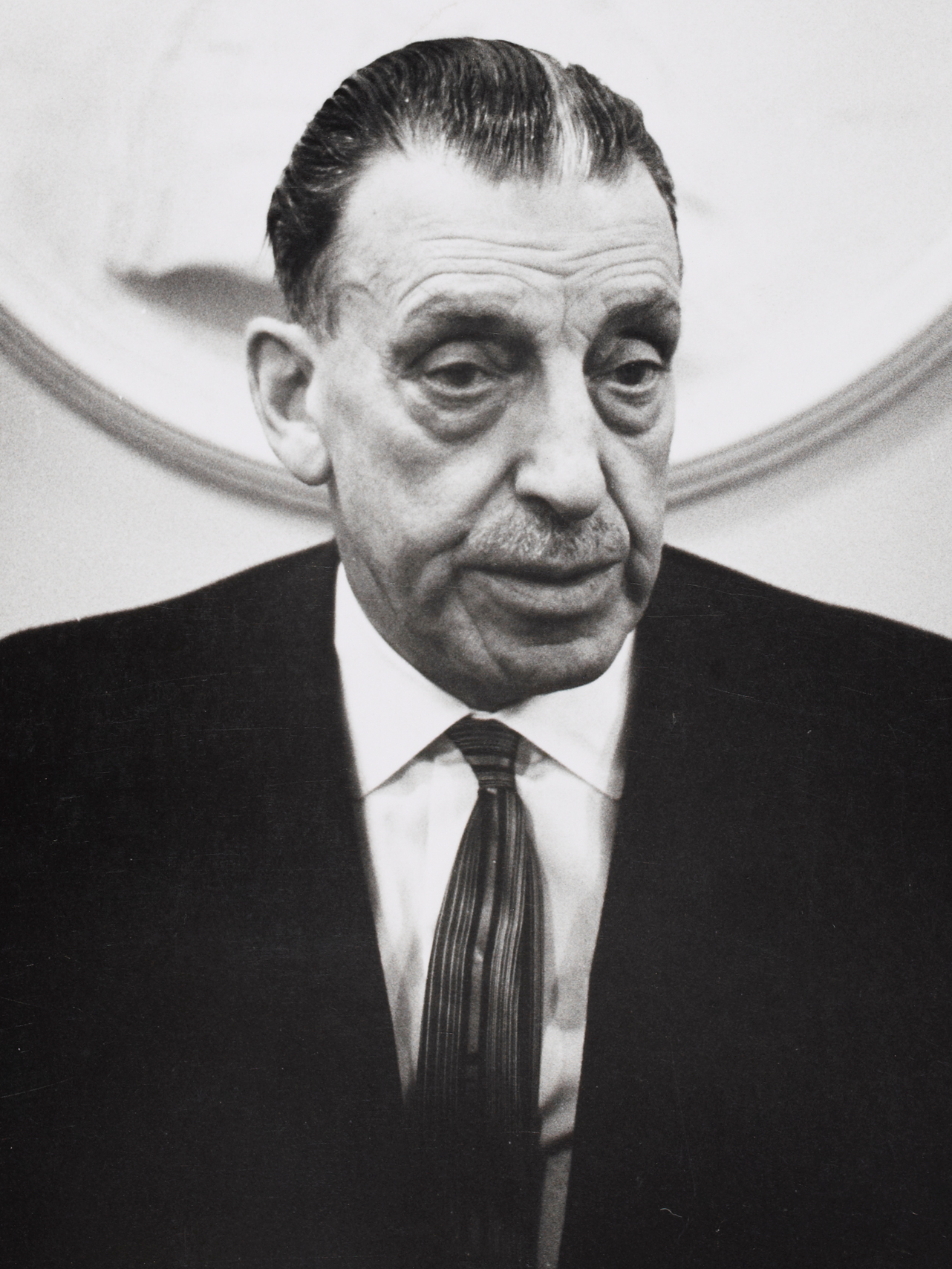
Seán Lemass succeeded De Valera as leader of Fianna Fáil

Seán Lemass became the new leader of the Party and Taoiseach on 23 June 1959 (the same day de Valera became president). A founding member of the party, he had been a member of every Fianna Fáil government since 1932.

Lemass as Taoiseach concentrated his energy on mainly economic matters. He had the task of implementing the 'First Programme for Economic Development' which began in 1958. The policy of Protectionism was abandoned and free trade was introduced. Grants and tax concessions were given to companies who set up in Ireland. As a result of the 'Programme' the Irish economy grew at a rate of 4% per annum. A second, even more ambitious, Programme for Economic Expansion was started in 1963. Tom Garvin, professor emeritus of politics at University College Dublin, has argued that Lemass suggested and enabled protectionism from 1932, and then was unduly credited when he chose to revert to a free trade policy after 1960.

Lemass' success in managing the economy led to his victory in the 1961 general election. Lemass now felt that he had a greater mandate and began making more changes including the establishment of Taca He introduced a new wave of fresh and more modern thinkers to the Cabinet, including Brian Lenihan, Charles Haughey, George Colley and Patrick Hillery. Even though this was a minority government it is considered by many the best and most productive government in the history of the state.

The sixties were a time of great change in Ireland. In 1961 RTÉ television began broadcasting, opening up a new world to the Irish people. The following year the Second Vatican Council led to – according to its supporters – greater openness in the Catholic Church, which was still a major force in Ireland. In 1963 the U.S. President John F. Kennedy visited Ireland. In 1966 free secondary education was announced by the Minister for Education, Donogh O'Malley.

During this term Lemass began a new policy of reconciliation with Northern Ireland. On 9 January 1965, Lemass travelled to Stormont in great secrecy for talks with Prime Minister of Northern Ireland Terence O'Neill. In February O'Neill returned the compliment and visited Lemass in Dublin.

In November 1966 Lemass announced his resignation as leader and Taoiseach. After fifty years serving Ireland and its people, the founding fathers, Seán Lemass, Seán MacEntee and James Ryan, who had dominated Irish politics for so long, left the stage of history.

== Lynch (1966–79) ==
Jack Lynch was elected the third leader of Fianna Fáil and Taoiseach on 10 November 1966. Frank Aiken, the long-serving Minister for Foreign Affairs and the last surviving member from de Valera's first Cabinet, was appointed Tánaiste. During Lynch's first term as Taoiseach he faced several crises which were unprecedented. In 1969 the Troubles broke out in Northern Ireland. Lynch was determined that the violence would not spread to the Republic and cause a civil war. At the height of the violence he made a famous speech on RTÉ saying that the Irish "government could no longer stand by and watch innocent people be injured or perhaps worse". Many thought that the Republic was about to invade the North, and contingency plans were drawn up by the Irish Army to take Derry and Newry. These were never implemented, as it was believed that to invade the North would have triggered the slaughter of countless Catholics at the hands of their heavily armed unionist neighbours. Lynch was mostly successful in confining the violence to Northern Ireland. He also established centres to process Catholic refugees.

The following year (1970) Lynch discovered that two government ministers, Charles Haughey and Neil Blaney, had apparently become involved in a plot to import arms for use by the Provisional IRA. Both men were sacked from the Cabinet in what became known as the Arms Crisis. Later Haughey and Blaney were arrested and put on trial, however, both were acquitted. The crisis led to deep division within Fianna Fáil for some time.

On 1 January 1973, Ireland officially became a member of the European Economic Community (EEC). This was one of the major achievements of Lynch's terms as Taoiseach and one which was started by Lemass over ten years earlier. Following the 1973 general election Fianna Fáil found themselves in opposition. It was the first change of government for sixteen years. The Fine Gael–Labour Party coalition lasted for four years.

In the 1977 general election Fianna Fáil won its biggest ever election victory with a majority of ten seats. The reasons for its big victory were the populist economic policies it put forward, the dissatisfaction with the Coalition, the huge popularity of Lynch as leader, and the attempted gerrymander of many constituencies by Minister Tully. However, after two years the government grew more and more unpopular. Poor results in the European elections and two by-elections added to the pressure on Lynch and he resigned on 5 December 1979. Two days later a two-horse leadership race between George Colley and Charles Haughey developed.

== Haughey (1979–92) ==
Despite his career nearly being destroyed by the Arms Crisis in 1970, Charles Haughey was elected the fourth leader of Fianna Fáil and subsequently Taoiseach, replacing Jack Lynch in both positions. This leadership election divided the party and would culminate in the expulsion of Desmond O'Malley in 1985, but not before a number of internal leadership challenges against Haughey took place. Haughey took the seal of office at a time of economic and social downturn. The population of the country had increased by 15% while employment increased at 1% per year, however, the public sector accounted for a large portion of this growth. A third of Ireland's workforce were employed by in public service jobs by the 1980s; this promoted Haughey to make a ministerial broadcast on Raidió Teilifís Éireann in 1980 addressing the current state the nation was in. During this broadcast, Haughey cited unsustainable public spending and social decadence as a reason for the downturn in the Irish economy. His famous quote 'As a community, we are living away beyond our means.' was coined in this broadcast. Job creation and economic growth were not meeting targets set by the Department of Finance and a trade deficit of 760 million Irish pounds was recorded. Furthermore, income tax and other government revenues were falling at around 520 million Irish pounds and the State was unable to meet its expenditure; thus, borrowing was increased and over 1 billion Irish pounds had to be borrowed year on year. Haughey increased public spending in an effort to entice economic growth but the poor world economy had been bolstered by the 1979 oil crisis and economic growth that had been predicted never came to fruition. This failure to rein in government spending and bring the economy back to positive growth led to Fianna Fáil being defeated at the 1981 general election and receiving its worst result in 20 years. Haughey was unable to form a government and returned to the opposition benches with his party.

1982/1983 was an extraordinary period for Irish politics. Two general elections were held and there were three attempts to overthrow Haughey as leader of Fianna Fáil. In the February 1982 general election Haughey again failed to win a majority. Several TDs led by Desmond O'Malley challenged Haughey for the leadership but backed down on the day of the vote. Haughey was elected Taoiseach with the help of Independent TDs. In October another attempt to oust Haughey was initiated by Charlie McCreevy. This time the issue was put to a vote but Haughey won easily when an open vote was held. Following the November 1982 general election Fianna Fáil lost power and another leadership battle loomed in Fianna Fáil. In February 1983 another challenge to overthrow Haughey was made. This time a secret ballot was held but the result was practically the same, 40 votes to 33 in favour of Haughey. Fianna Fáil then spent four years in opposition.

Following the 1987 general election Fianna Fáil returned to power but had failed to gain an overall majority. Haughey was narrowly elected Taoiseach. During this term as Taoiseach Haughey belatedly concentrated on economic issues, trying to turn around the country's fiscal situation. During the 1980s, underlying economic problems became pronounced. Middle income workers were taxed 60% of their marginal income. By that time, Ireland was the sick man of Western Europe and barely escaped having the International Monetary Fund (IMF) take over the economy. In 1989 Haughey tried to pull off what would have been his greatest achievement. He called an early general election in the hope of gaining an overall majority. However, instead of gaining seats Fianna Fáil lost seats and was forced to form a coalition with the Progressive Democrats, a political offshoot led by O'Malley, to stay in power. Fianna Fáil had always ruled out coalition government beforehand, and many in the party were unhappy with Haughey's volte-face. This marked the beginning of the end for Haughey.

Following the 1990 presidential election Haughey was forced to sack his Tánaiste and long-time friend, Brian Lenihan. In 1991 Haughey faced a leadership challenge from Albert Reynolds. This challenge was unsuccessful, but it showed that Haughey was losing his grip on the party. In 1992 Seán Doherty placed Haughey at the centre of a scandal regarding the tapping of two journalists' telephones ten years earlier. Haughey had always maintained that he knew nothing about this, but Doherty publicly stated otherwise. This time Haughey's luck had run out; under pressure from the PDs, he resigned. Albert Reynolds, who had challenged Haughey in 1991, emerged as the new leader of Fianna Fáil and Taoiseach.

== Reynolds (1992–94) ==
On 11 February 1992, Albert Reynolds was elected Taoiseach. After receiving his seal of office from President Mary Robinson he announced his new Cabinet. Eight members of Haughey's old cabinet, including such long-serving Haughey loyalists as Ray Burke, Mary O'Rourke and Gerry Collins, were instantly dismissed. Nine of the twelve junior ministers, many of whom were also Haughey men, were also sacked. The ministers who had been sacked along with Reynolds at the end of 1991 were all reinstated. Reynolds promoted several long-time critics of Haughey, like David Andrews, Séamus Brennan and Charlie McCreevy to senior ministerial positions. Reynolds also promoted younger TDs from rural constituencies, such as Noel Dempsey and Brian Cowen, to cabinet positions. Bertie Ahern, one of Haughey's oldest friends, and Michael Woods were the only two senior members to remain in the new Reynolds Cabinet, with Ahern retaining his Finance portfolio.

Reynolds had hoped to continue in coalition with the Progressive Democrats. However, following the "Beef Tribunal" to examine the relationship between Charles Haughey and beef baron Larry Goodman a substantial conflict of opinion between Desmond O'Malley and Albert Reynolds arose. When Reynolds gave evidence he referred to O'Malley as "dishonest". This enraged the Progressive Democrats' leader; his party not only pulled out of the coalition, but called a motion of no confidence and toppled the government.

When the results of the 1992 general election came in it was clear that both Fianna Fáil and Fine Gael had done badly. Labour achieved their best ever result with 33 seats. After negotiations Fianna Fáil entered into a coalition with the Labour Party. Dick Spring of the Labour Party took on the important roles of Tánaiste and Minister for Foreign Affairs. In 1993 Albert Reynolds and Bertie Ahern, who was then Minister for Finance, wrote to developer Owen O'Callaghan seeking a substantial donation. At the time O'Callaghan was heavily involved in lobbying for state support for a stadium project at Neilstown, County Dublin. According to the report, O'Callaghan felt compelled to donate a sum of IR£80,000 to Fianna Fáil in order to get funding for the stadium. The Mahon Tribunal final report said it did not find the payment to be corrupt. However, the report said pressurising a businessman to donate money when he was seeking support for a commercial project was "entirely inappropriate, and was an abuse of political power and government authority".

One of the most important components of Reynolds's period as Taoiseach was the Northern Ireland peace process. The agreement paved the way for an IRA ceasefire in 1994. This was one of the most important achievements of Reynolds's short term.

In 1994 Reynolds and Spring had a disagreement over an appointment of a judge to the Irish Supreme Court. Both men wanted to appoint someone different and both had their own reasons for doing so. Eventually this disagreement led to the end of Reynolds's period as Taoiseach and he resigned in November 1994. Reynolds received annual pension payments of €149,740. The new leader to emerge was the then Minister for Finance Bertie Ahern.

== Ahern (1994–2008) ==
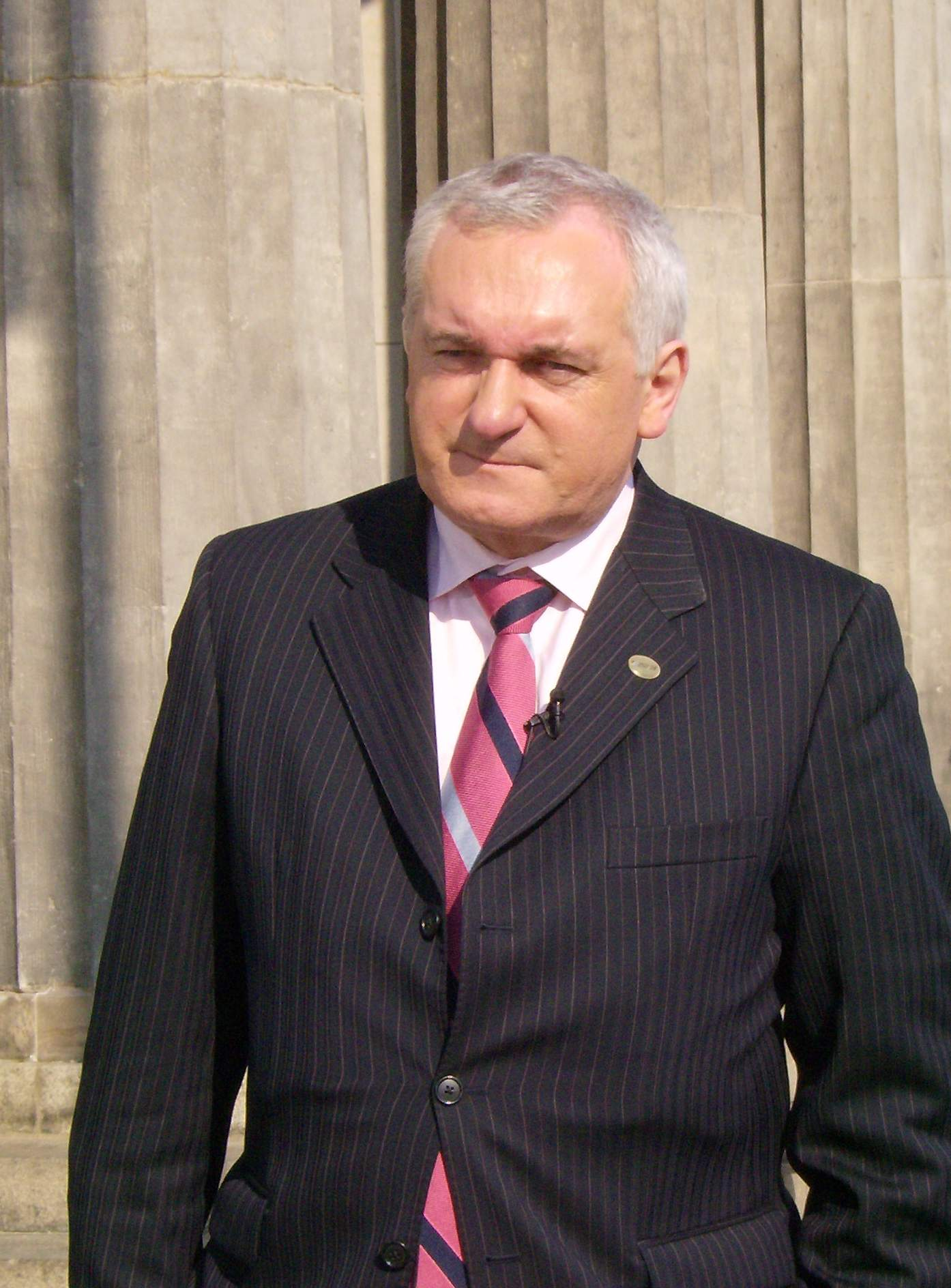
Bertie Ahern, the sixth leader of Fianna Fáil (1994–2008). He served as Taoiseach from 1997 to 2008.

On 19 November 1994, Bertie Ahern was elected the sixth and youngest ever leader of Fianna Fáil. Ahern was poised to become Taoiseach and continue in coalition with the Labour Party. However, the day before the government was to return, Dick Spring called off the deal and the coalition ended. Instead the Labour Party helped form a new government led by Fine Gael. Ahern now found himself as leader of the opposition, a position which he had not anticipated. Following the 1997 general election, Fianna Fáil formed a government with the Progressive Democrats and on 26 June 1997, aged 45, Ahern became the youngest ever Taoiseach.

The election of Tony Blair in Britain gave renewed hope of an agreement for peace in Northern Ireland, an issue that has traditionally always been an aspiration of Irish Governments. The work of Ahern and his government, as well as that of the relevant power bases in the UK and the US, culminated in the Good Friday Agreement. This agreement was signed by politicians from the Republic, supported by the opposition and politicians in Britain and Northern Ireland and ratified by the electorate on both sides of the Irish border.

During Ahern's first term Fianna Fáil faced increased criticism over payments to politicians. Ray Burke was forced to resign as Minister for Foreign Affairs due to payments made to him, and the late Liam Lawlor was also being investigated over payments he received. Both were eventually jailed. Also, the Moriarty Tribunal revealed details of former leader Charles Haughey's financial affairs. His trial on these charges was postponed indefinitely after the judge in the case found that he would not be able to get a fair trial following prejudicial comments by Tánaiste Mary Harney.

The results of the 2002 general election left Fianna Fáil short of achieving an overall majority. Fianna Fáil continued in coalition with the Progressive Democrats. It was the first time since 1969 that an Irish government had been re-elected.

In the 2004 local elections saw Fianna Fáil's share of the vote drop by seven percentage points from its 1999 result to only 32% on a 60% turnout losing 20% of its council seats. The party lost its majority on Clare County Council for the first time in 70 years, and fell behind Fine Gael in Galway, Limerick and Waterford city councils. This was partly due to sixteen cuts in the area of social welfare.

In response to this, some shifts in policy and a cabinet reshuffle took place in September 2004, including Charlie McCreevy's resignation as Finance minister to join the European Commission.

In November 2004, on the 10th anniversary next week of his election as Fianna Fáil leader, Ahern famously kept a straight face when called himself 'one of the few socialists left' despite a common perception that the FF/PD Government of over 7 years at that stage represented a considerable shift to the right. From that point on, particularly with the appointment of Brian Cowen as Finance Minister, the government dramatically increased spending and reduced taxes. Commentators now believe that these policies not only lay at the heart of the government's future problems but highlighted the non-ideological, centre-ground populism of Ahern's leadership.

Fianna Fáil won 78 seats in the 2007 general election, while their coalition partners, the Progressive Democrats, lost six seats. After the election Fianna Fáil entered into a coalition with the Green Party and the Progressive Democrats, while also being supported three Independent TD's Michael Lowry, Jackie Healy-Rae and Finian McGrath. Ahern was re-elected as Taoiseach on 14 June 2007 for a third term. In December 2007, Fianna Fáil was officially registered as a political party in Northern Ireland.

Ahern gave testimony to the Mahon Tribunal in September 2007 about monies received by him, as large cash sums, in the 1990s. Ahern survived a subsequent vote of no confidence in his leadership in the Dáil, the first "no confidence" Dáil motion debated since 1994. On 2 April 2008, Ahern announced his resignation from the leadership of Fianna Fáil, effective on 6 May 2008. He receives annual pension payments of €152,331.

== Cowen (2008–11) ==
Following the 2008 leadership election, Tánaiste and Minister for Finance Brian Cowen succeeded Ahern as leader of Fianna Fáil on 6 May 2008 and was appointed Taoiseach on 7 May 2008. Cowen first faced the rejection of the Treaty of Lisbon by Irish voters in June 2008. In September 2008 following the collapse of US brokerage house Bear Stearns and reported problems in a number of Irish banks, particularly Anglo-Irish Bank and AIB, Cowen and his Minister of Finance Brian Lenihan introduced the controversial Credit Institutions (Financial Support) Act 2008; a unilateral bank bailout and a guarantee for a number of Irish Banks.

The controversial emergency budget of October 2008 delivered by Brian Lenihan Jnr, caused major upset amongst pensioners for removing the automatic medical card for over 70 year olds the decision had to be revised initially twice within a week of delivery to attempt to defuse back bench revolt. This caused a backlash against the government on this issue and on another broken promise regarding school class sizes caused one Fianna Fáil TD Joe Behan resigned. Finian McGrath, an Independent TD who had agreed to support the government, then announced he would be opposing the government. Still however the removal of the universal nature of the medical card was seen as contradicting the long term party policy, which had in the past introduced free bus pass for pensioners, and subsidised Television Licences and Telephone lines. As of November 2008, approximately 1.2 million troops have passed through Shannon Airport since the beginning of the Iraq War.

In 2009 Fianna Fáil became more unpopular. The party fared poorly in the 2009 local elections, where they finished second to Fine Gael. The party also lost its sole MEP in Dublin, for European Parliament elections held the same day. In 2010, Minister of Defense Willie O'Dea was forced to resign in an affidavit scandal involving the smearing of a political opponent, in what the Evening Herald described as "two absolutely calamitous weeks". The party's relationship with their Green Party coalition partners also became tense.

Ireland requested financial assistance from the IMF and the ECB in November 2010. It followed several weeks of denials that a bailout was going to happen. Fianna Fáil's opinion poll ratings plunged further in the weeks after the IMF bailout. The party also performed disastrously in a by election in Donegal South-West. The Green Party, the junior coalition partner, effectively withdrew their support for the government and demanded a general election be held in the early part of the new year.

Cowen was also damaged by revelations of a series of meetings he held with Sean FitzPatrick, the then chair of Anglo-Irish Bank before the controversial bank bailout The Fitzpatrick Tapes. In January 2011, 6 cabinet ministers resigned within a matter of days. Cowen's attempt to promote junior ministers into the cabinet was blocked by the Green Party. Cowen conceded the election date for March 11. Following the botched reshuffle, rebellion within his own party, and an acknowledged public relations disaster, Cowen announced his resignation as leader of Fianna Fáil on 22 January 2011. He insisted, however, that he would continue as Taoiseach until the election, in order to complete legislation for the 2011 budget. The election was subsequently brought forward to 25 February.

He receives annual pension payments of over €150,000.

== Martin (2011–present) ==
There were four candidates in the election for the party's eighth leader: Micheál Martin, Brian Lenihan, Mary Hanafin and Éamon Ó Cuív. Martin, who had previously challenged Cowen for the leadership, won the election.

Martin inherited a nearly impossible situation. The party's support had plunged into the low teens, and it was obvious that it would not win a record fifth consecutive term in government. Indeed, soon after taking the leadership, Martin wrote off the election as a lost cause, but hoped to hold on to at least 30 seats.

In the 2011 election, Fianna Fáil suffered the worst defeat of a sitting government in the history of the Irish state, and one of the worst ever suffered by a Western European governing party. The party saw its first-preference vote more than halved, to 17.4 per cent. Without benefit of significant transfers, the party was reduced to a rump of 20 seats, knocking it down to third place behind Fine Gael and Labour. This was easily the worst election result in the party's history; previously, the party had never won fewer than 60 seats in an election.

The most high-profile casualty was Tánaiste Mary Coughlan, who lost the seat she had held in Donegal South-West since 1987. Britain's Guardian newspaper described it as "Ireland's Portillo moment". Other senior cabinet ministers who lost their seats included Pat Carey and Mary Hanafin, who had just been elected Deputy Leader.

Notably, the party was nearly wiped off the map in Dublin, which had been its power base for over 30 years. Lenihan was the only one of Fianna Fáil's 13 TDs to keep his seat.

For the Seanad elections, Martin recommended support for 10 candidates, in an attempt to bring new blood into the parliamentary party. This caused resentment from the party's councillors and incumbent senators. Only five of the recommended 10 were elected, although the party performed better than expected winning 14 seats.

FF's finances were in considerable strain, with the party having €3.6 million in debts. The party was kicked out of its meeting room in Dáil Éireann which it had been entitled to use as the largest party since the 1960s. The move was resisted by Fianna Fáil TDs with Michael McGrath claiming there was no "genuine" reason to move.

The party also faced a challenge to it holding the chair of the Public Accounts Committee. By tradition the chair of the PAC was held by a member of the largest opposition party. However both Sinn Féin and the Technical group supported the nomination of the Independent Shane Ross. Catherine Murphy, the chief whip of the Technical Group, stated that "there's a certain immorality in holding that position given the history of the party".

On 29 February 2012, Ó Cuív resigned as Fianna Fáil's Deputy Leader and Communications Spokesperson. He resigned from these positions due to dissatisfaction with his party's position on the Fiscal Compact Referendum. Fianna Fáil leader Micheál Martin stated that Ó Cuív would face expulsion from the parliamentary party if he did not vote with the party on the Fiscal Compact in the Dáil. Coming just a week before their Ard Fhies, Ó Cuív's resignation caused a split down the middle of the Fianna Fáil party.

Following the 2020 general election, Michéal Martin became Taoiseach, leading a coalition with Fine Gael and the Green Party.
