= Bernard Cowen =

Irish politician (1932–1984)

Minister of State
- Mar.–Dec. 1982: Agriculture

Teachta Dála
- In office July 1977 – 24 January 1984
- In office July 1969 – February 1973
- Constituency: Laois–Offaly

Senator
- In office 1 June 1973 – 27 October 1977
- Constituency: Agricultural Panel

Personal details
- Born: 29 January 1932 Clara, County Offaly, Ireland
- Died: 24 January 1984 (aged 51) Dublin, Ireland
- Party: Fianna Fáil
- Spouse: Mary Cowen (m. 1955)
- Children: 3, including Brian and Barry

Bernard Francis Cowen (29 January 1932 – 24 January 1984) was an Irish Fianna Fáil politician who served as a Minister of State from March 1982 to December 1982. He served as a Teachta Dála (TD) for the Laois–Offaly constituency from 1969 to 1973 and 1977 to 1984. He was a Senator for the Agricultural Panel from 1973 to 1977.

== Early life ==
Born in Clara, County Offaly, the son of Christy Cowen, a cattle dealer and a Fianna Fáil member who served as a member of Offaly County Council from 1932 until his death in 1967. Cowen was educated at Clara National School and subsequently attended Tullamore CBS. After completion of his secondary schooling he worked in the family business which included a public house and a butcher shop. He later became an auctioneer.

== Political career ==
Cowen first held political office in 1967, when he was co-opted onto Offaly County Council, following the death of his father. Later that year he headed the poll in the Tullamore area and retained his seat until his death.

Cowen was first elected to Dáil Éireann as a Fianna Fáil TD for Laois–Offaly constituency at the 1969 general election. Fianna Fáil returned to government for the fourth successive time following a general election, however, as a new TD, Cowen remained on the backbenches. He lost his seat at the 1973 general election as a Fine Gael-Labour coalition government was formed. Cowen, however, was subsequently elected to the 13th Seanad for the Agricultural Panel.

Cowen returned to the Dáil following the 1977 general election, when Fianna Fáil returned to power in a landslide. Once again he remained on the backbenches.

In 1979, Jack Lynch resigned as Taoiseach and Leader of Fianna Fáil. Cowen supported Charles Haughey's successful bid for the leadership, but failed to secure promotion to ministerial office.

A period of political instability followed with three general elections being held throughout 1981 and 1982. Cowen retained his seat in all of these elections. In March 1982, he was promoted to junior ministerial level, when he was appointed Minister of State at the Department of Agriculture with special responsibility for disadvantaged areas. He held that position until December of the same year, when Fianna Fáil lost office.

== Death ==
While attending a meeting of Offaly County Council in January 1984, Cowen was taken ill. He was taken to St. Vincent's Hospital in Dublin. He died several days later on 24 January 1984. He was survived by his wife, Mary, and three sons. The consequent by-election for his seat in the 24th Dáil was won by his second son, Brian, who later served as Taoiseach from 2008 to 2011. In 2011, Bernard Cowen's youngest son, Barry, was elected to the seat previously held by his father and brother, having previously been an Offaly County Councillor for the Tullamore local electoral area.

Political offices
Preceded by Michael D'Arcy; Ted Nealon	Minister of State at the Department of Agriculture with Lorcan Allen; Mar.–Dec. 1982	Succeeded by Patrick Hegarty; Paul Connaughton

Dáil	Election	Deputy (Party)	Deputy (Party)	Deputy (Party)	Deputy (Party)	Deputy (Party)
2nd	1921	Joseph Lynch (SF)	Patrick McCartan (SF)	Francis Bulfin (SF)	Kevin O'Higgins (SF)	4 seats 1921–1923
3rd	1922	William Davin (Lab)	Patrick McCartan (PT-SF)	Francis Bulfin (PT-SF)	Kevin O'Higgins (PT-SF)	4 seats 1921–1923
4th	1923	William Davin (Lab)	Laurence Brady (Rep)	Francis Bulfin (CnaG)	Patrick Egan (CnaG)	Seán McGuinness (Rep)
4th	1926 by-election	William Davin (Lab)	Laurence Brady (Rep)	Francis Bulfin (CnaG)	Patrick Egan (CnaG)	James Dwyer (CnaG)
5th	1927 (Jun)	William Davin (Lab)	Patrick Boland (FF)	Thomas Tynan (FF)	John Gill (Lab)	James Dwyer (CnaG)
6th	1927 (Sep)	William Davin (Lab)	Patrick Boland (FF)	Patrick Gorry (FF)	William Aird (CnaG)	James Dwyer (CnaG)
7th	1932	William Davin (Lab)	Patrick Boland (FF)	Patrick Gorry (FF)	Thomas F. O'Higgins (CnaG)	Eugene O'Brien (CnaG)
8th	1933	William Davin (Lab)	Patrick Boland (FF)	Eamon Donnelly (FF)	Thomas F. O'Higgins (CnaG)	Jack Finlay (NCP)
9th	1937	William Davin (Lab)	Patrick Boland (FF)	Patrick Gorry (FF)	Thomas F. O'Higgins (FG)	Jack Finlay (FG)
10th	1938	William Davin (Lab)	Patrick Boland (FF)	Patrick Gorry (FF)	Thomas F. O'Higgins (FG)	Daniel Hogan (FF)
11th	1943	William Davin (Lab)	Patrick Boland (FF)	Patrick Gorry (FF)	Thomas F. O'Higgins (FG)	Oliver J. Flanagan (IMR)
12th	1944	William Davin (Lab)	Patrick Boland (FF)	Patrick Gorry (FF)	Thomas F. O'Higgins (FG)	Oliver J. Flanagan (IMR)
13th	1948	William Davin (Lab)	Patrick Boland (FF)	Patrick Gorry (FF)	Tom O'Higgins, Jnr (FG)	Oliver J. Flanagan (Ind.)
14th	1951	William Davin (Lab)	Patrick Boland (FF)	Peadar Maher (FF)	Tom O'Higgins, Jnr (FG)	Oliver J. Flanagan (Ind.)
15th	1954	William Davin (Lab)	Nicholas Egan (FF)	Peadar Maher (FF)	Tom O'Higgins, Jnr (FG)	Oliver J. Flanagan (FG)
15th	1956 by-election	Kieran Egan (FF)	Nicholas Egan (FF)	Peadar Maher (FF)	Tom O'Higgins, Jnr (FG)	Oliver J. Flanagan (FG)
16th	1957	Kieran Egan (FF)	Nicholas Egan (FF)	Peadar Maher (FF)	Tom O'Higgins, Jnr (FG)	Oliver J. Flanagan (FG)
17th	1961	Kieran Egan (FF)	Nicholas Egan (FF)	Patrick Lalor (FF)	Tom O'Higgins, Jnr (FG)	Oliver J. Flanagan (FG)
18th	1965	Henry Byrne (Lab)	Nicholas Egan (FF)	Patrick Lalor (FF)	Tom O'Higgins, Jnr (FG)	Oliver J. Flanagan (FG)
19th	1969	Ger Connolly (FF)	Bernard Cowen (FF)	Patrick Lalor (FF)	Tom Enright (FG)	Oliver J. Flanagan (FG)
20th	1973	Ger Connolly (FF)	Charles McDonald (FG)	Patrick Lalor (FF)	Tom Enright (FG)	Oliver J. Flanagan (FG)
21st	1977	Ger Connolly (FF)	Bernard Cowen (FF)	Patrick Lalor (FF)	Tom Enright (FG)	Oliver J. Flanagan (FG)
22nd	1981	Ger Connolly (FF)	Bernard Cowen (FF)	Liam Hyland (FF)	Tom Enright (FG)	Oliver J. Flanagan (FG)
23rd	1982 (Feb)	Ger Connolly (FF)	Bernard Cowen (FF)	Liam Hyland (FF)	Tom Enright (FG)	Oliver J. Flanagan (FG)
24th	1982 (Nov)	Ger Connolly (FF)	Bernard Cowen (FF)	Liam Hyland (FF)	Tom Enright (FG)	Oliver J. Flanagan (FG)
24th	1984 by-election	Ger Connolly (FF)	Brian Cowen (FF)	Liam Hyland (FF)	Tom Enright (FG)	Oliver J. Flanagan (FG)
25th	1987	Ger Connolly (FF)	Brian Cowen (FF)	Liam Hyland (FF)	Tom Enright (FG)	Charles Flanagan (FG)
26th	1989	Ger Connolly (FF)	Brian Cowen (FF)	Liam Hyland (FF)	Tom Enright (FG)	Charles Flanagan (FG)
27th	1992	Ger Connolly (FF)	Brian Cowen (FF)	Liam Hyland (FF)	Pat Gallagher (Lab)	Charles Flanagan (FG)
28th	1997	John Moloney (FF)	Brian Cowen (FF)	Seán Fleming (FF)	Tom Enright (FG)	Charles Flanagan (FG)
29th	2002	John Moloney (FF)	Brian Cowen (FF)	Seán Fleming (FF)	Olwyn Enright (FG)	Tom Parlon (PDs)
30th	2007	John Moloney (FF)	Brian Cowen (FF)	Seán Fleming (FF)	Olwyn Enright (FG)	Charles Flanagan (FG)
31st	2011	Brian Stanley (SF)	Barry Cowen (FF)	Seán Fleming (FF)	Marcella Corcoran Kennedy (FG)	Charles Flanagan (FG)
32nd	2016	Constituency abolished. See Laois and Offaly.				
33rd	2020	Brian Stanley (SF)	Barry Cowen (FF)	Seán Fleming (FF)	Carol Nolan (Ind.)	Charles Flanagan (FG)
33rd	2024	Brian Stanley (SF)	(Vacant)	Seán Fleming (FF)	Carol Nolan (Ind.)	Charles Flanagan (FG)
34th	2024	Constituency abolished. See Laois and Offaly.				
