= 1984 Laois–Offaly by-election =

By-election to the 24th Dáil

- 14 June 1984
- Turnout: 47,581 (64.2%)
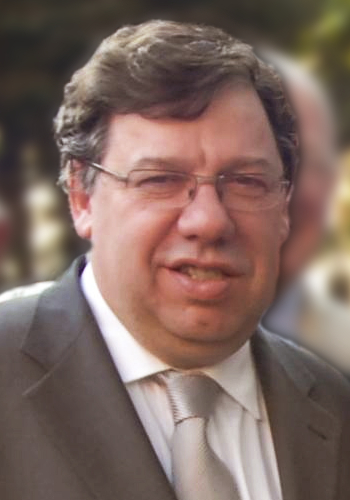
		Horan	O'Brien
Nominee	Brian Cowen	Pádraig Horan	Seán O'Brien
Party	Fianna Fáil	Fine Gael	Labour
First preferences	26,022	18,173	1,737
Percentage	54.7%	38.2%	3.7%
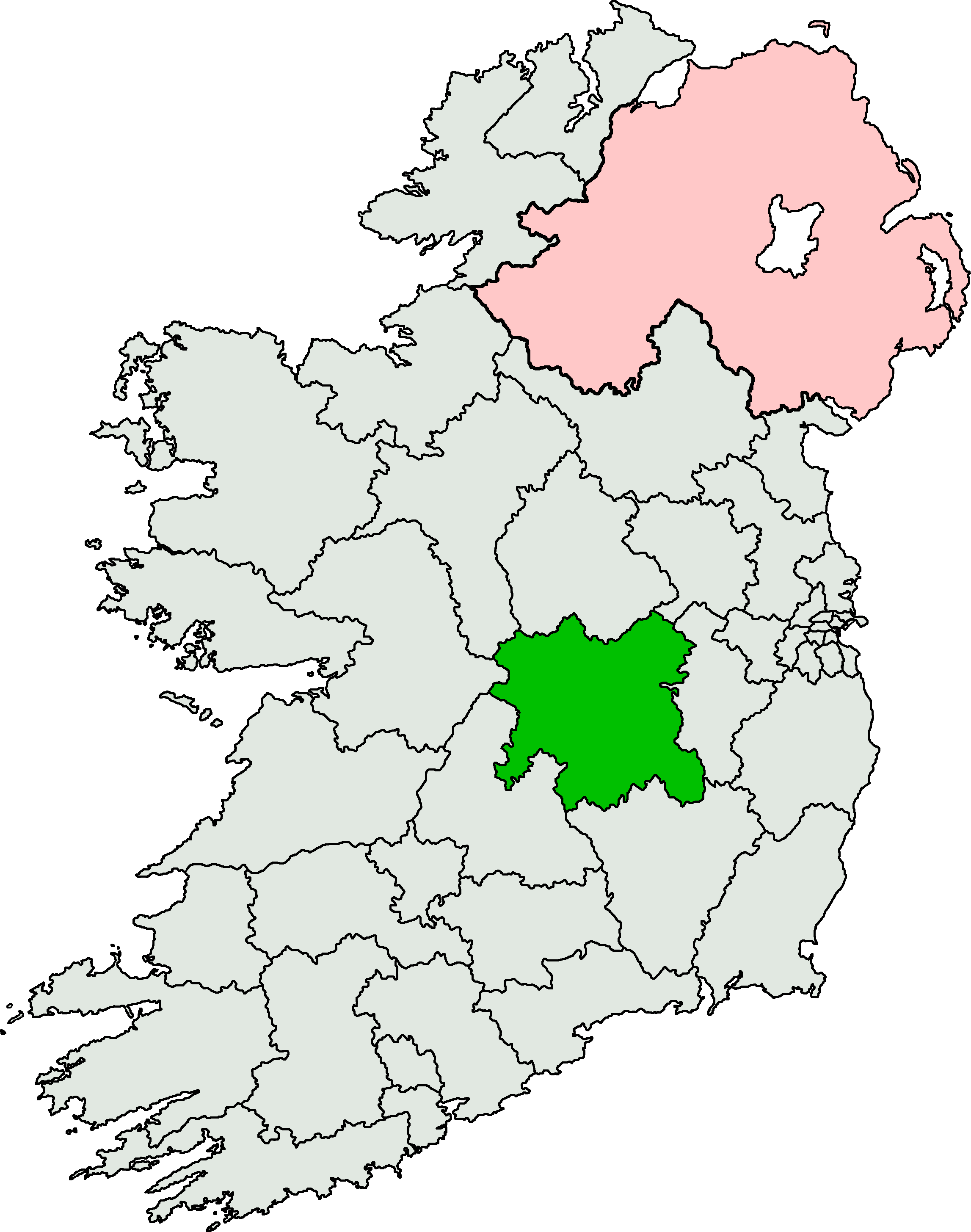
- Laois–Offaly shown within Ireland
TD before election
Bernard Cowen
Fianna Fáil
TD after election
Brian Cowen
Fianna Fáil

A Dáil by-election was held in the constituency of Laois–Offaly in Ireland on Thursday, 14 June 1984, to fill a vacancy in the 24th Dáil. It followed the death of Fianna Fáil Teachta Dála (TD) Bernard Cowen who died on 24 January 1984.

A Fianna Fáil motion to move the writ on 29 February 1984 was defeated by the Fine Gael–Labour government. A second motion to move the writ on 17 May 1984 was unopposed. The by-election was held on 14 June 1984, the same day as the European Parliament elections.

The by-election was won by the Fianna Fáil candidate Brian Cowen, son of the deceased TD, Bernard Cowen.

== Result ==
1984 Laois–Offaly by-election
Party	Candidate	FPv%	Count
Party	Candidate	FPv%	1
Fianna Fáil	Brian Cowen	54.7	26,022
Fine Gael	Pádraig Horan	38.2	18,173
Labour	Seán O'Brien	3.7	1,737
Independent	Joe McCormack	3.1	1,471
Communist	Eoin Ó Murchú	0.3	120
Independent	Jim Tallon	0.1	58
Electorate: 74,087 Valid: 47,581 Quota: 23,791 Turnout: 64.2%
