= Barry Cowen =

Irish politician (born 1967)

Barry Cowen MEP
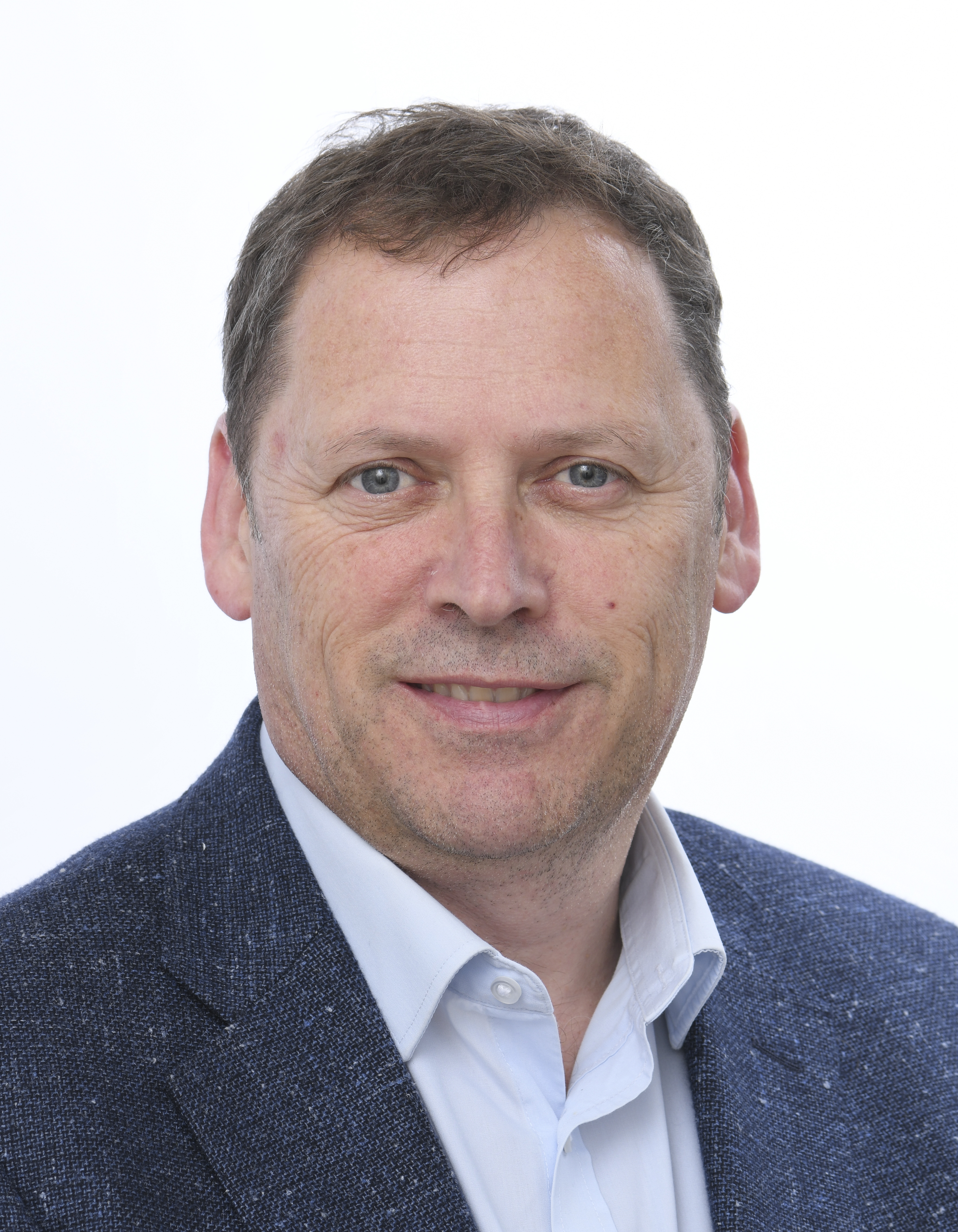
- Cowen in 2024

Member of the European Parliament
- Incumbent
- Assumed office 17 July 2024
- Constituency: Midlands–North-West

Teachta Dála
- In office February 2020 – 17 July 2024
- In office February 2011 – February 2016
- Constituency: Laois–Offaly
- In office February 2016 – February 2020
- Constituency: Offaly

Minister for Agriculture, Food and the Marine
- In office 27 June 2020 – 14 July 2020
- Taoiseach: Micheál Martin
- Preceded by: Michael Creed
- Succeeded by: Micheál Martin (acting)

Personal details
- Born: 28 August 1967 (age 58) Clara, County Offaly, Ireland
- Party: Ireland: Fianna Fáil; EU: Renew Europe
- Spouse: Mary Cowen (m. 1995)
- Children: 4
- Parent: Bernard Cowen (father)
- Relatives: Brian Cowen (brother)
- Education: University College Galway

Barry Cowen (born 28 August 1967) is an Irish Fianna Fáil politician who has been a Member of the European Parliament (MEP) from Ireland for the Midlands–North-West constituency since July 2024. He previously served as a Teachta Dála (TD) representing Laois–Offaly from 2011 to 2016, Offaly from 2016 to 2020, and Laois–Offaly again from 2020 to 2024. He served as Minister for Agriculture, Food and the Marine from June to July 2020.

== Early life ==
His father Bernard Cowen was a TD, Senator and Minister of State. His grandfather Christy Cowen was an Offaly County Councillor and a member of the Fianna Fáil National Executive. He is the brother of former Taoiseach Brian Cowen.

He is married with four children and is a full-time politician.

== Political career ==
He was a member of Offaly County Council for the Tullamore local electoral area from 1991 to 2011. He was elected to the 31st Dáil at the 2011 general election for Laois–Offaly, succeeding his brother Brian.

He has served in various Fianna Fáil Front Bench roles such as Social Protection from 2011 to 2012, spokesperson for Housing, Planning and Local Government from 2012 to 2018 and spokesperson for Public Expenditure and Reform from 2018 to 2020.

He represented Fianna Fáil in talks on government formation in 2016 and 2020.

In July 2020, it emerged that Cowen had a conviction for drink driving. Cowen was fined €200 and was disqualified from driving for three months. The incident occurred in September 2016, after an All-Ireland football final between Dublin and Mayo. Cowen apologised for his "serious lapse of judgement". The Garda Síochána Ombudsman Commission was asked by the Gardaí to investigate the alleged leaking of information concerning Minister for Agriculture Barry Cowen's drink driving arrest. Cowen accused gardaí of criminality for leaking allegations that he attempted to evade a garda checkpoint before he was caught drink driving. Cowen admitted receiving a ban for drink drinking but denied attempting to evade gardaí. He issued a statement that the garda record was "incorrect" and suggested he would take legal action against the Sunday Times, which first reported the story. Cowen said that the leaks were a flagrant breach of criminal law and “my rights under data protection law” and that they were an "attempt to cause me the maximum personal and political harm." Fianna Fáil TD Thomas Byrne has denied that it was he who leaked news of Cowen's ban to the press. Eamon Dooley, a long serving Fianna Fáil member of Offaly County Council, claimed that a party member with a "grudge" leaked it to the media.

On 14 July 2020, after Cowen refused to resign as Minister for Agriculture, Taoiseach Micheál Martin advised President Michael D. Higgins to sack Cowen from cabinet due to the controversy surrounding his conviction for drink driving. In accordance with Irish constitutional practice, Higgins did so. In November 2020, it was reported that a barrister was to be questioned by GSOC in relation to the leak. In 2021, GSOC searched a Garda station in Munster in relation to the leak.

In July 2021, Cowen called on Fianna Fáil to form a new "modern centre-left" alliance with the Labour Party for the next election.

In March 2023, political news website The Ditch reported that Cowen had failed to declare rental income from 32 acres of farmland, in breach of Standards in Public Office Commission rules. Cowen subsequently confirmed that he intended to correct his declaration to the Dáil Register of Interests.

In 2023 he opposed extending the eviction ban put in place during the COVID-19 pandemic, comparing an extension to "making sweets free for children". These comments caused controversy and he subsequently apologised for the remarks.

In 2024, Cowen won the Fianna Fáil nomination to stand in the 2024 European Parliament election in the Midlands–North-West constituency, defeating senators Niall Blaney and Lisa Chambers at the selection convention. Blaney and Chambers were both added to the Fianna Fáil election ticket later. Cowen was elected to the second of five seats in the constituency. He took office on 17 July 2024.

== See also ==
- Families in the Oireachtas

Political offices
Preceded by Michael Creed	Minister for Agriculture, Food and the Marine; 2020	Succeeded by Micheál Martin (acting)

Dáil	Election	Deputy (Party)	Deputy (Party)	Deputy (Party)
32nd	2016	Carol Nolan (SF)	Barry Cowen (FF)	Marcella Corcoran Kennedy (FG)
33rd	2020	Constituency abolished. See Laois–Offaly and Tipperary.		
34th	2024	Carol Nolan (Ind.)	Tony McCormack (FF)	John Clendennen (FG)

Dáil	Election	Deputy (Party)	Deputy (Party)	Deputy (Party)	Deputy (Party)	Deputy (Party)
2nd	1921	Joseph Lynch (SF)	Patrick McCartan (SF)	Francis Bulfin (SF)	Kevin O'Higgins (SF)	4 seats 1921–1923
3rd	1922	William Davin (Lab)	Patrick McCartan (PT-SF)	Francis Bulfin (PT-SF)	Kevin O'Higgins (PT-SF)	4 seats 1921–1923
4th	1923	William Davin (Lab)	Laurence Brady (Rep)	Francis Bulfin (CnaG)	Patrick Egan (CnaG)	Seán McGuinness (Rep)
4th	1926 by-election	William Davin (Lab)	Laurence Brady (Rep)	Francis Bulfin (CnaG)	Patrick Egan (CnaG)	James Dwyer (CnaG)
5th	1927 (Jun)	William Davin (Lab)	Patrick Boland (FF)	Thomas Tynan (FF)	John Gill (Lab)	James Dwyer (CnaG)
6th	1927 (Sep)	William Davin (Lab)	Patrick Boland (FF)	Patrick Gorry (FF)	William Aird (CnaG)	James Dwyer (CnaG)
7th	1932	William Davin (Lab)	Patrick Boland (FF)	Patrick Gorry (FF)	Thomas F. O'Higgins (CnaG)	Eugene O'Brien (CnaG)
8th	1933	William Davin (Lab)	Patrick Boland (FF)	Eamon Donnelly (FF)	Thomas F. O'Higgins (CnaG)	Jack Finlay (NCP)
9th	1937	William Davin (Lab)	Patrick Boland (FF)	Patrick Gorry (FF)	Thomas F. O'Higgins (FG)	Jack Finlay (FG)
10th	1938	William Davin (Lab)	Patrick Boland (FF)	Patrick Gorry (FF)	Thomas F. O'Higgins (FG)	Daniel Hogan (FF)
11th	1943	William Davin (Lab)	Patrick Boland (FF)	Patrick Gorry (FF)	Thomas F. O'Higgins (FG)	Oliver J. Flanagan (IMR)
12th	1944	William Davin (Lab)	Patrick Boland (FF)	Patrick Gorry (FF)	Thomas F. O'Higgins (FG)	Oliver J. Flanagan (IMR)
13th	1948	William Davin (Lab)	Patrick Boland (FF)	Patrick Gorry (FF)	Tom O'Higgins, Jnr (FG)	Oliver J. Flanagan (Ind.)
14th	1951	William Davin (Lab)	Patrick Boland (FF)	Peadar Maher (FF)	Tom O'Higgins, Jnr (FG)	Oliver J. Flanagan (Ind.)
15th	1954	William Davin (Lab)	Nicholas Egan (FF)	Peadar Maher (FF)	Tom O'Higgins, Jnr (FG)	Oliver J. Flanagan (FG)
15th	1956 by-election	Kieran Egan (FF)	Nicholas Egan (FF)	Peadar Maher (FF)	Tom O'Higgins, Jnr (FG)	Oliver J. Flanagan (FG)
16th	1957	Kieran Egan (FF)	Nicholas Egan (FF)	Peadar Maher (FF)	Tom O'Higgins, Jnr (FG)	Oliver J. Flanagan (FG)
17th	1961	Kieran Egan (FF)	Nicholas Egan (FF)	Patrick Lalor (FF)	Tom O'Higgins, Jnr (FG)	Oliver J. Flanagan (FG)
18th	1965	Henry Byrne (Lab)	Nicholas Egan (FF)	Patrick Lalor (FF)	Tom O'Higgins, Jnr (FG)	Oliver J. Flanagan (FG)
19th	1969	Ger Connolly (FF)	Bernard Cowen (FF)	Patrick Lalor (FF)	Tom Enright (FG)	Oliver J. Flanagan (FG)
20th	1973	Ger Connolly (FF)	Charles McDonald (FG)	Patrick Lalor (FF)	Tom Enright (FG)	Oliver J. Flanagan (FG)
21st	1977	Ger Connolly (FF)	Bernard Cowen (FF)	Patrick Lalor (FF)	Tom Enright (FG)	Oliver J. Flanagan (FG)
22nd	1981	Ger Connolly (FF)	Bernard Cowen (FF)	Liam Hyland (FF)	Tom Enright (FG)	Oliver J. Flanagan (FG)
23rd	1982 (Feb)	Ger Connolly (FF)	Bernard Cowen (FF)	Liam Hyland (FF)	Tom Enright (FG)	Oliver J. Flanagan (FG)
24th	1982 (Nov)	Ger Connolly (FF)	Bernard Cowen (FF)	Liam Hyland (FF)	Tom Enright (FG)	Oliver J. Flanagan (FG)
24th	1984 by-election	Ger Connolly (FF)	Brian Cowen (FF)	Liam Hyland (FF)	Tom Enright (FG)	Oliver J. Flanagan (FG)
25th	1987	Ger Connolly (FF)	Brian Cowen (FF)	Liam Hyland (FF)	Tom Enright (FG)	Charles Flanagan (FG)
26th	1989	Ger Connolly (FF)	Brian Cowen (FF)	Liam Hyland (FF)	Tom Enright (FG)	Charles Flanagan (FG)
27th	1992	Ger Connolly (FF)	Brian Cowen (FF)	Liam Hyland (FF)	Pat Gallagher (Lab)	Charles Flanagan (FG)
28th	1997	John Moloney (FF)	Brian Cowen (FF)	Seán Fleming (FF)	Tom Enright (FG)	Charles Flanagan (FG)
29th	2002	John Moloney (FF)	Brian Cowen (FF)	Seán Fleming (FF)	Olwyn Enright (FG)	Tom Parlon (PDs)
30th	2007	John Moloney (FF)	Brian Cowen (FF)	Seán Fleming (FF)	Olwyn Enright (FG)	Charles Flanagan (FG)
31st	2011	Brian Stanley (SF)	Barry Cowen (FF)	Seán Fleming (FF)	Marcella Corcoran Kennedy (FG)	Charles Flanagan (FG)
32nd	2016	Constituency abolished. See Laois and Offaly.				
33rd	2020	Brian Stanley (SF)	Barry Cowen (FF)	Seán Fleming (FF)	Carol Nolan (Ind.)	Charles Flanagan (FG)
33rd	2024	Brian Stanley (SF)	(Vacant)	Seán Fleming (FF)	Carol Nolan (Ind.)	Charles Flanagan (FG)
34th	2024	Constituency abolished. See Laois and Offaly.				
