= Brian Cowen =

Taoiseach from 2008 to 2011

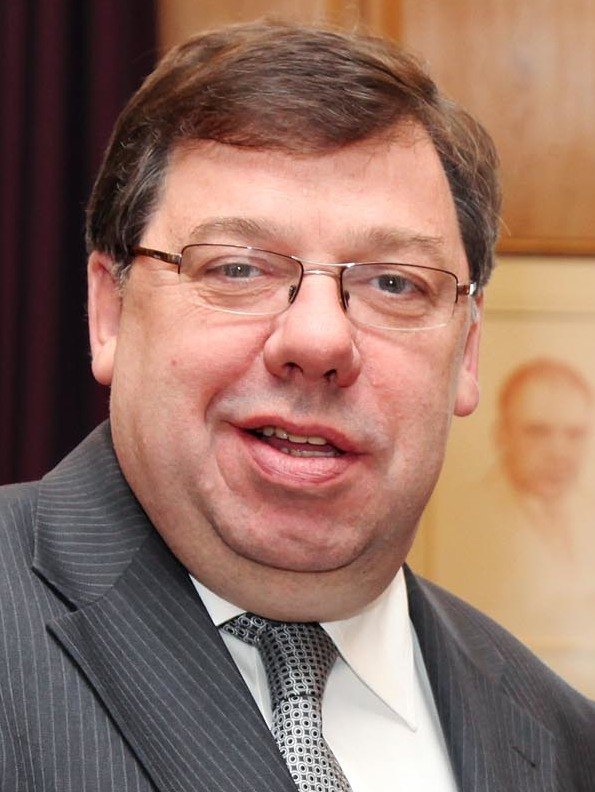
- Cowen in 2010

Taoiseach
- In office 7 May 2008 – 9 March 2011
- President: Mary McAleese
- Tánaiste: Mary Coughlan
- Preceded by: Bertie Ahern
- Succeeded by: Enda Kenny

Leader of Fianna Fáil
- In office 9 April 2008 – 26 January 2011^{[nb]}
- Deputy: Mary Coughlan
- Preceded by: Bertie Ahern
- Succeeded by: Micheál Martin
Other offices
Minister for Foreign Affairs
Acting; 19 January 2011 – 9 March 2011
Taoiseach	Himself
Preceded by	Micheál Martin
Succeeded by	Eamon Gilmore
In office 27 January 2000 – 29 September 2004
Taoiseach	Bertie Ahern
Preceded by	David Andrews
Succeeded by	Dermot Ahern
Tánaiste
In office 14 June 2007 – 7 May 2008
Taoiseach	Bertie Ahern
Preceded by	Michael McDowell
Succeeded by	Mary Coughlan
Deputy leader of Fianna Fáil
In office 28 July 2002 – 7 May 2008
Leader	Bertie Ahern
Preceded by	Mary O'Rourke
Succeeded by	Mary Coughlan
Minister for Finance
In office 29 September 2004 – 7 May 2008
Taoiseach	Bertie Ahern
Preceded by	Charlie McCreevy
Succeeded by	Brian Lenihan
Minister for Health and Children
In office 26 June 1997 – 27 January 2000
Taoiseach	Bertie Ahern
Preceded by	Michael Noonan
Succeeded by	Micheál Martin
Minister for Transport, Energy and Communications
In office 22 January 1993 – 15 December 1994
Taoiseach	Albert Reynolds
Preceded by	Charlie McCreevy
Succeeded by	Michael Lowry
Minister for Energy
In office 12 January 1993 – 22 January 1993
Taoiseach	Albert Reynolds
Preceded by	Albert Reynolds
Succeeded by	Charlie McCreevy
Minister for Labour
In office 11 February 1992 – 12 January 1993
Taoiseach	Albert Reynolds
Preceded by	Michael O'Kennedy
Succeeded by	Mervyn Taylor

Teachta Dála
- In office June 1984 – February 2011
- Constituency: Laois–Offaly

Personal details
- Born: Brian Bernard Cowen; 10 January 1960 (age 66) Tullamore, County Offaly, Ireland
- Party: Fianna Fáil
- Spouse: Mary Molloy (m. 1994)
- Children: 2
- Parent: Bernard Cowen (father)
- Relatives: Barry Cowen (brother)
- Education: University College Dublin
- n.b. Acting: 22 – 26 January 2011

Brian Bernard Cowen (born 10 January 1960) is an Irish former politician who served as Taoiseach and Leader of Fianna Fáil from 2008 to 2011. Cowen served as a TD for the constituency of Laois–Offaly from 1984 to 2011 and served in several ministerial roles between 1992 and 2011, including as Minister for Finance from 2004 to 2008 and Tánaiste from 2007 to 2008.

Cowen was elected leader of Fianna Fáil in May 2008, upon the resignation of Bertie Ahern, and was nominated by Dáil Éireann to replace him as Taoiseach. Weeks after taking office, his administration faced the Irish financial and banking crises. He received substantial criticism for his failure to stem the tide of either crisis, ultimately culminating in the Irish Government's formal request for financial aid from the European Union and the International Monetary Fund, which was widely regarded in Ireland as a national humiliation.

His leadership subsequently saw public support for Fianna Fáil plunge to record lows, and Cowen set a record for the lowest approval rating in the history of Irish opinion polling, at one point reaching an approval rating of 8 per cent. In January 2011, following a failed attempt at a cabinet reshuffle, and facing growing political pressure, Cowen resigned as Leader of Fianna Fáil, but remained as Taoiseach until after the general election held the following month where Cowen left politics and officially resigned as Taoiseach and left office a fortnight later. He is the only leader of Fianna Fáil not to take the party into an election.

The Sunday Times described Cowen's tenure as Taoiseach as "a dismal failure". In 2011, the Irish Independent called Cowen the "worst Taoiseach in the history of the State".

== Early and private life ==
Brian Cowen was born to a Catholic family, in Tullamore, County Offaly, on 10 January 1960. He was raised in Clara by his parents, May and Bernard Cowen, a Fianna Fáil TD and Senator. The family owned a public house, butcher shop and undertaking business in Clara, beside the family home. His father also worked as an auctioneer. Cowen often worked as a barman in his father's pub when he was growing up. He has two brothers, Christopher and Barry. Barry Cowen became a TD for Laois–Offaly in 2011.

Cowen was educated at Clara National School, Árd Scoil Naomh Chiaráin, in Clara and the Cistercian College of Mount St. Joseph in Roscrea, County Tipperary. He was twelve years old when he entered Mount St. Joseph College, as a boarder. After secondary school, he attended University College Dublin where he studied law. He subsequently qualified as a solicitor from the Incorporated Law Society of Ireland, Dublin.

He is a member of the Gaelic Athletic Association and continues to serve as president of Clara GAA club, for whom he played in the early 1980s. He also played with the Offaly Gaelic football team at this time, having previously played with their minor and under-21 teams. Cowen likes to socialise with his constituents in some of the local pubs in his native Offaly. In May 2003, he took part in a charity CD project organised by The Brewery Tap pub in Tullamore. The CD featured 28 songs, including Cowen singing the Phil Coulter song "The Town I Loved So Well".

In May 2007, Cowen told Jason O'Toole of Hot Press that, as a student: "I would say there were a couple of occasions when marijuana was passed around – and, unlike President Clinton, I did inhale. There wasn't a whole lot in it really."

Cowen is married to Mary Molloy and they have two daughters. In 2017, Cowen was conferred with an honorary Doctor of Laws degree by the National University of Ireland.

== Early political career ==
Cowen was elected to Dáil Éireann in the 1984 Laois–Offaly by-election, caused by the death of his father Bernard Cowen. At the time Cowen, at the age of 24, became the youngest member of the 24th Dáil. He was also elected to Offaly County Council in the same year, taking over the seat vacated by his late father. He served on that authority until 1992.

Cowen remained on the backbenches of Fianna Fáil for the next seven years. Following the 1989 general election when Fianna Fáil formed a coalition government, with the Progressive Democrats, for the first time, Cowen was one of several TDs who were vehemently opposed to the move. Two years later in November 1991, the Minister for Finance, Albert Reynolds, challenged Charles Haughey, for the leadership of the party. Cowen firmly aligned himself behind Reynolds and quickly became associated with the party's so-called "Country and Western" wing (Reynolds's supporters earned this nickname because the vast majority were rural TDs and Reynolds had made a lot of money in the dance hall business in the 1960s). Reynolds became leader on his second attempt when Haughey was forced to retire as Taoiseach in 1992.

Reynolds appointed Cowen, aged 32, to his first cabinet position as Minister for Labour. Despite being a member of the cabinet, Cowen was openly hostile toward the PDs. This was evident at the Fianna Fáil party's Ardfheis in March 1992. In the warm-up speech before the leader's address, Cowen remarked, "What about the PDs? When in doubt, leave them out." He fought with the PDs, being furious at their interference with Fianna Fáil's view that, as majority partners, they should have wielded the power.

The 1992 general election produced a hung Dáil and resulted in negotiations between all the main parties. Cowen, along with Noel Dempsey and Bertie Ahern, negotiated on behalf of Fianna Fáil in an attempt to form a government with the Labour Party. A deal was reached between the two parties, and Cowen was again appointed Minister for Transport, Energy and Communications. In that role, he implemented the controversial decision to relax the so-called stopover at Shannon Airport, which allowed limited direct trans-Atlantic flights from Dublin Airport. The decision proved divisive and saw one Fianna Fáil TD, Síle de Valera, resign from the party in protest.

In October 1994, it was revealed that Cowen had 1,000 shares in Arcon, a company to which he was in the process of awarding a mining licence. He quickly sold the shares and apologised in the Dáil for causing himself and his colleagues "some embarrassment".

Later in 1994, Albert Reynolds resigned as Taoiseach and leader of Fianna Fáil. Bertie Ahern became the new leader, and initially appeared set to replace Reynolds as Taoiseach. However, Labour chose to end the coalition with Fianna Fáil and took part in a new coalition with Fine Gael and Democratic Left, consigning Fianna Fáil to the opposition. Cowen was appointed to the front bench, first as Spokesperson on Agriculture, Food and Forestry (1994), and later as Spokesperson on Health (1997).

== Cabinet career (1997–2008) ==
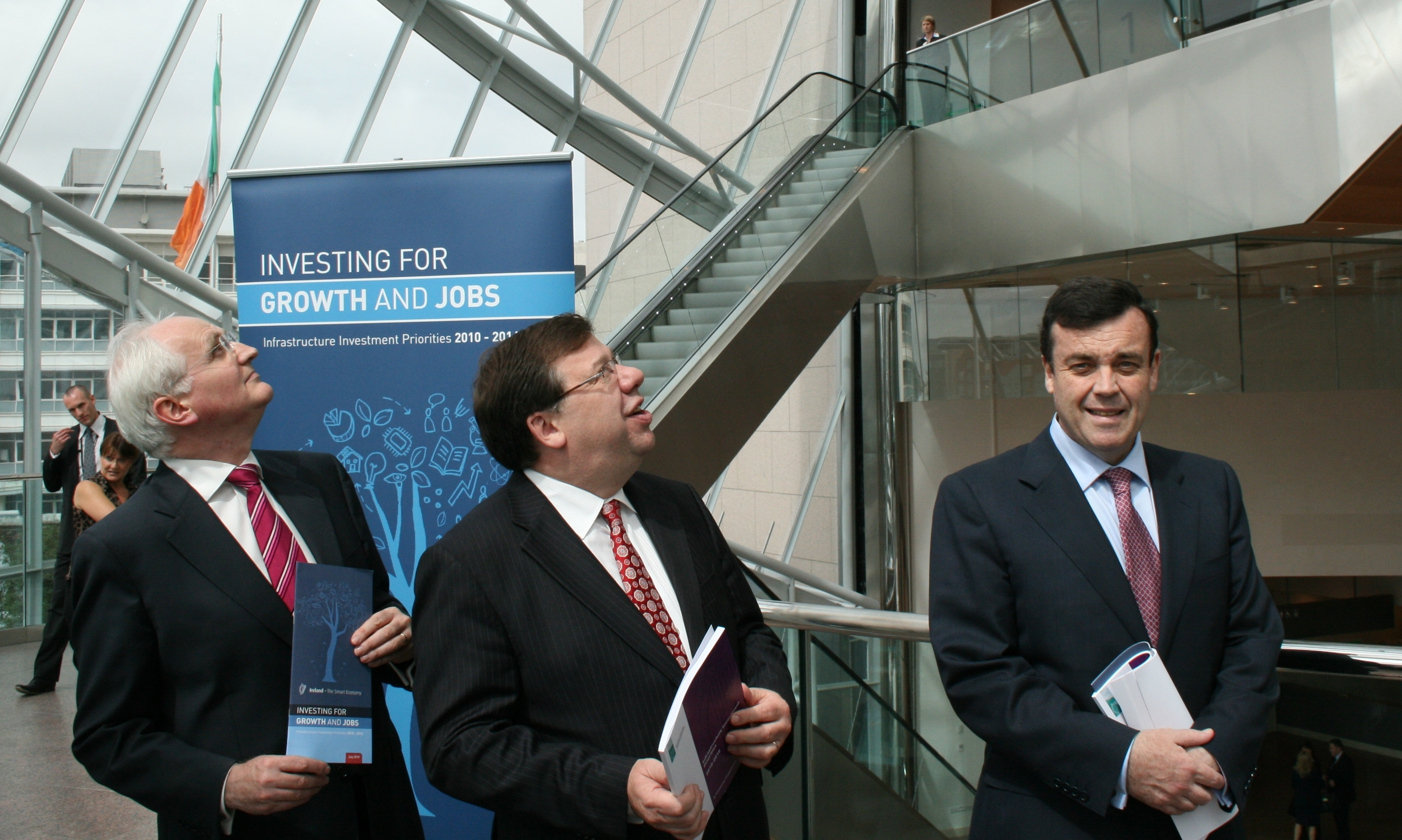
Brian Cowen (centre) at the launch of the Capital Investment Plan in 2010

=== Minister for Health and Children ===
When Fianna Fáil returned to the government following the 1997 general election, Cowen was appointed as Minister for Health and Children. He described his period there as like being in Angola because administrative "landmines" could detonate without warning. During his tenure, he had to deal with problems of bed shortages and overcrowding in hospitals, as well as a prolonged nurses' strike in 1999.

=== Minister for Foreign Affairs ===
In a cabinet reshuffle following the retirement of David Andrews in January 2000, Cowen was appointed as Minister for Foreign Affairs. His tenure saw extensive negotiations continue regarding the Northern Ireland peace process and other international activities, particularly when Ireland gained a place on the United Nations Security Council. In 2003, he was the subject of a personal attack by the leader of Northern Ireland's Democratic Unionist Party, Ian Paisley. In front of a crowd of party supporters and the presence of television cameras and radio reporters, Paisley uttered a diatribe about Cowen's appearance and also insulted his mother. In 2004, Cowen played a key role during Ireland's Presidency of the European Council, during which and the European Union expanded from 15 to 25 member states.

=== Minister for Finance ===
Following the departure of Finance Minister Charlie McCreevy, upon his nomination as Ireland's European Commissioner in September 2004, Cowen was appointed as Minister for Finance. On 1 December 2004, he announced his first budget, one that was viewed as a give-away budget in which spending was increased by 9%.

Cowen's second budget in 2005 was dominated by a new childcare package, and measures to take 'tax-free millionaires' back into the tax net from 2007 by restricting tax breaks. A readjustment of income-tax measures was designed to take 52,000 low earners out of the tax net and remove 90,000 middle earners from the higher tax band.

Cowen's third budget in 2007, in anticipation of the 2007 general election, was regarded as one of the biggest spending sprees in the history of the state. The €3.7 billion package included increases in pension and social welfare allowances, a marked green agenda, as well as a reduction in the top rate of income tax from 42% to 41%. Cowen has been criticised for alleged complacency during the economic turmoil in January 2008.

== Leader of Fianna Fáil ==
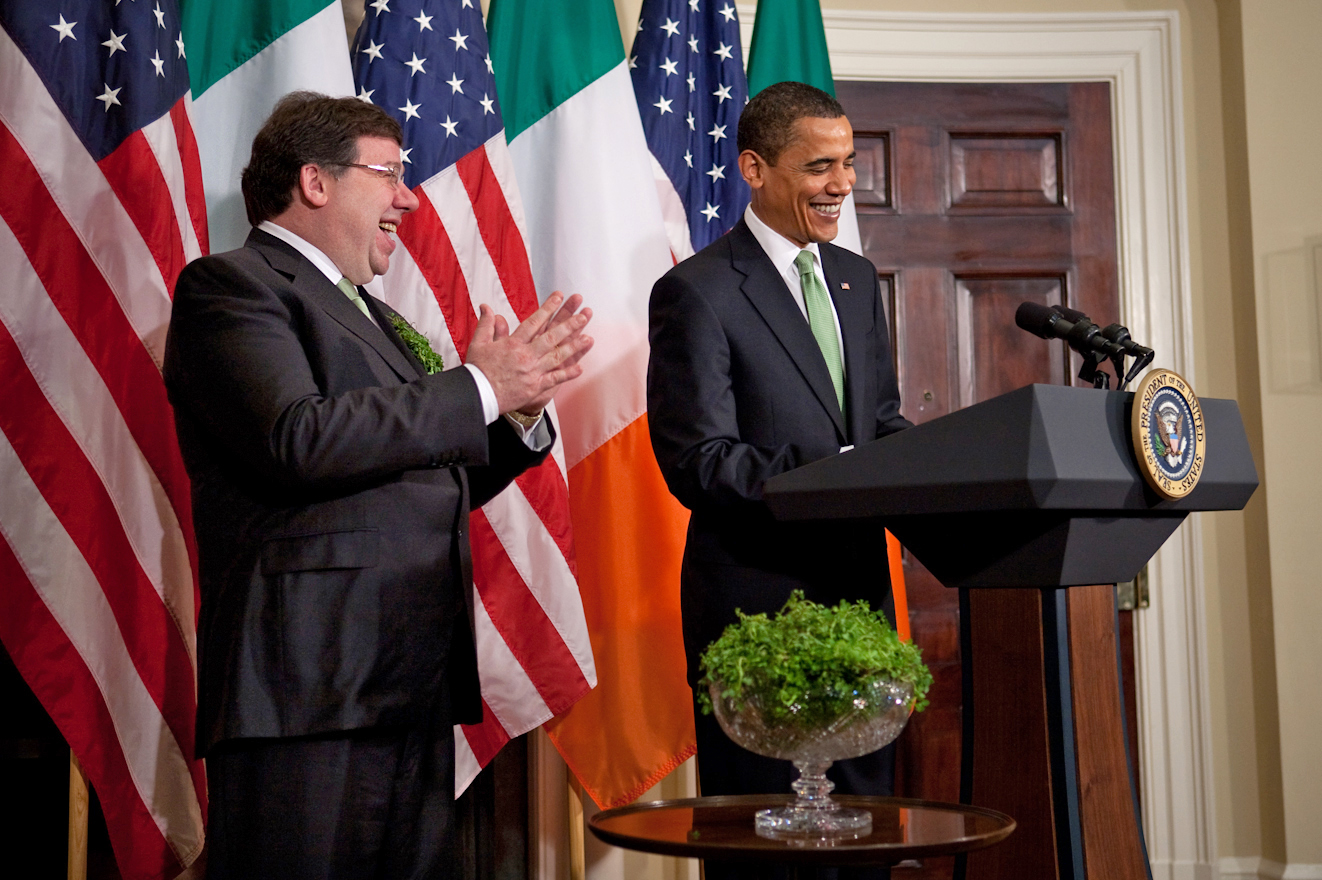
Brian Cowen presenting President Barack Obama with a bowl of shamrock for Saint Patrick's Day at the White House.

During his ministerial career, Cowen was often identified in the media as the front-runner to succeed Ahern as leader of Fianna Fáil. Cowen's position was strengthened when he succeeded Mary O'Rourke as deputy leader of the party in 2002. In 2004, he was appointed Minister for Finance. Following the 2007 general election, Cowen became Tánaiste (deputy prime minister) in a coalition between Fianna Fáil, the PDs, and the Green Party.

On 4 April 2008, two days after Ahern announced his intention to resign as Taoiseach and Leader of Fianna Fáil, Cowen was nominated by Brian Lenihan and Mary Coughlan to be his successor. The following day he was confirmed as the sole nominee for the position. He was acclaimed as the seventh leader of Fianna Fáil on 9 April 2008, and assumed office upon Ahern's resignation becoming effective on 6 May 2008.

On 7 May 2008, Cowen was nominated by Dáil Éireann as Taoiseach, by 88 votes to 76, and was appointed by President of Ireland Mary McAleese.

On 22 January 2011, despite winning a secret confidence motion the week before, Cowen announced he was stepping down as leader, in advance of the 2011 election, to put the party in "the best possible position".

== Taoiseach (2008–2011) ==
Upon appointment, Cowen formed the 28th government of Ireland, a coalition between Fianna Fáil, the Greens and the PDs, which initially had the support of three independent TDs. His choices of Mary Coughlan for Tánaiste and Brian Lenihan Jnr as Minister for Finance were criticised as inappropriate by The Irish Times for their "distressing" lack of experience.

=== Treaty of Lisbon ===
The Irish electorate's rejection of the ratification of the Treaty of Lisbon on 12 June 2008, was viewed by some media and political observers as a protest against Cowen and his government. The Irish Independent called the failed referendum's aftermath the government's "biggest political crisis in decades". Columnist Brendan O'Connor called the outcome "a humiliating failure for Cowen and the people who put him there". The Taoiseach himself arguably dealt a damaging blow to his own side when, on 12 May 2008, he admitted in a radio interview that he had not read the Treaty of Lisbon in its entirety. The treaty was eventually approved by Irish voters when the successful Twenty-eighth Amendment of the constitution was approved in the second Lisbon referendum, held in October 2009.

=== 2009 Budget ===
Cowen delivered the Irish government budget for 2009 on 14 October 2008, brought forward from its usual December date due to the 2008 financial crisis. The budget, labelled "the toughest in many years", included several controversial measures, such as a proposed income levy and the withdrawal of previously promised HPV vaccines for schoolgirls. Other results of the budget included a new income levy being imposed on all workers above a specified threshold and the closure of several military barracks near the border with Northern Ireland.

A public outcry arose over the proposed withdrawal of medical cards and the reinstatement of university fees. A series of demonstrations ensued amongst teachers and farmers, whilst on 22 October 2008, at least 25,000 pensioners and students descended in solidarity on government buildings at Leinster House, Kildare Street, Dublin and outside the Department of the Taoiseach in Merrion Street. Some of the pensioners were even seen to cheer on the students as the protests passed each other on the streets of Dublin. Changes to education led to a ministerial meeting with three Church of Ireland bishops over what was viewed as a disproportionate level of cuts to be suffered by Protestant Secondary schools. Separately representatives of the Roman Catholic Church were assured by O'Keeffe that it would continue to be able to provide religious instruction to pupils in primary schools not under the patronage of the Church.

Rebellion within the ranks of the government led to several defections of disenchanted coalition members. County Wicklow TD Joe Behan, resigned from the Fianna Fáil party in protests at the proposed medical card changes. He, alongside two other government deputies, later voted against his former colleagues in two crucial Dáil votes on medical cards and cancer vaccines. These defections reduced the Irish government's majority of twelve by one quarter. Finian McGrath, an Independent TD, who agreed to support the government after the 2007 election, also withdrew his support from the government. A senior political source said: "The Budget was an accident waiting to happen."

Under the European Union stability and growth pact, EU states are required to keep their budget deficit-to-GDP ratio below a three per cent limit and maintain a debt-to-GDP ratio below 60 per cent. On 31 October 2008, the European Commission opened an excessive deficit procedure against the Government of Ireland, for allowing its budget deficit to exceed the required EU deficit-to-GDP ratio of 3 per cent. The Irish deficit was expected to be 5.5 percent in 2008, and 6.5 percent in 2009. This response forced reversals of proposed changes in several areas, contributing to a perceived weakness in his Government.

=== 2008 Pork crisis ===
On 6 December 2008, the Food Safety Authority of Ireland ordered the recall, withdrawal and destruction of all Irish pork products dating back to 1 September, due to the discovery of toxic levels of dioxin in a small percentage of the pig stock. Cowen additionally approved a five-day withdrawal of Irish pork from the market. Within days thousands of jobs were either lost or under threat at pig processing plants across the country, as processors refused to resume slaughter of pigs until they received financial compensation; the crisis ultimately cost taxpayers approximately €180 million. Cowen's government received heavy criticism for overreaction in its handling of the incident, with Leader of the Opposition Enda Kenny calling the government's response as "an unmitigated disaster".

=== Anglo Irish Bank ===
The heavy exposure of Anglo Irish Bank to property lending, with most of its loan book being to builders and property developers, meant that it was badly affected by the downturn in the Irish property market in 2008. On 15 January 2009, after attempting to salvage the Bank by injecting €1.5bn into its coffers, the Government announced that it would take steps that would enable the Bank to be taken into State ownership. The Anglo Irish Bank Corporation Act, of 2009 provided for the transfer of all the shares of the Bank to the Minister for Finance and was enacted under Irish law on 21 January 2009. On the same date, the Bank was re-registered as a private limited company. Observers at the time commented that the government had been slow to respond to the collapse of the Bank, with The Sunday Times stating that "Nationalisation was good enough for other European governments, but Brian Cowen's administration avoided the inevitable until its back was to the wall. Too frequently, it is seen to be reacting to events, not controlling them."

=== 2009 Emergency budget ===
In a second emergency budget, delivered in April 2009, a fiscal deficit of 10.75 percent of gross domestic product (GDP) was addressed. The budget's initiatives included a doubling of the previous year's income levy to 2%, 4% and 6%; increases on the excise duties on a regular packet of cigarettes (25 cents) and a litre of diesel (5 cents); a new "asset management agency" established to remove bad loans from Irish banks; the gradual elimination of early childcare supplement by 2010, to be replaced by a subsidy towards pre-school for 3- and 4-year-olds; and no further increases in social welfare for at least two years. Cowen defended the emergency measures as necessary.

=== First no confidence vote ===
National and international press reactions to the budget were largely favourable, with the economics editor of the BBC reporting that there were lessons for the United Kingdom to learn from this emergency procedure and the European Commission hailing the budget as a form of "decisive action". However, it did little to revive the political fortunes of Cowen's government. After Fianna Fáil performed badly in the elections of 5 June 2009, losing half its European Parliament seats, Fine Gael tabled a motion of no confidence against Cowen on 9 June. He survived the vote by a margin of 85–79. Support for the government continued to fall: on 3 September 2009, an Irish Times/TNS mrbi poll, opinion poll reported that Cowen's satisfaction rating had dropped six points to 15 per cent, with 77 per cent of voters saying they were dissatisfied with the way he was doing his job.

=== 2010 Budget and NAMA controversy ===
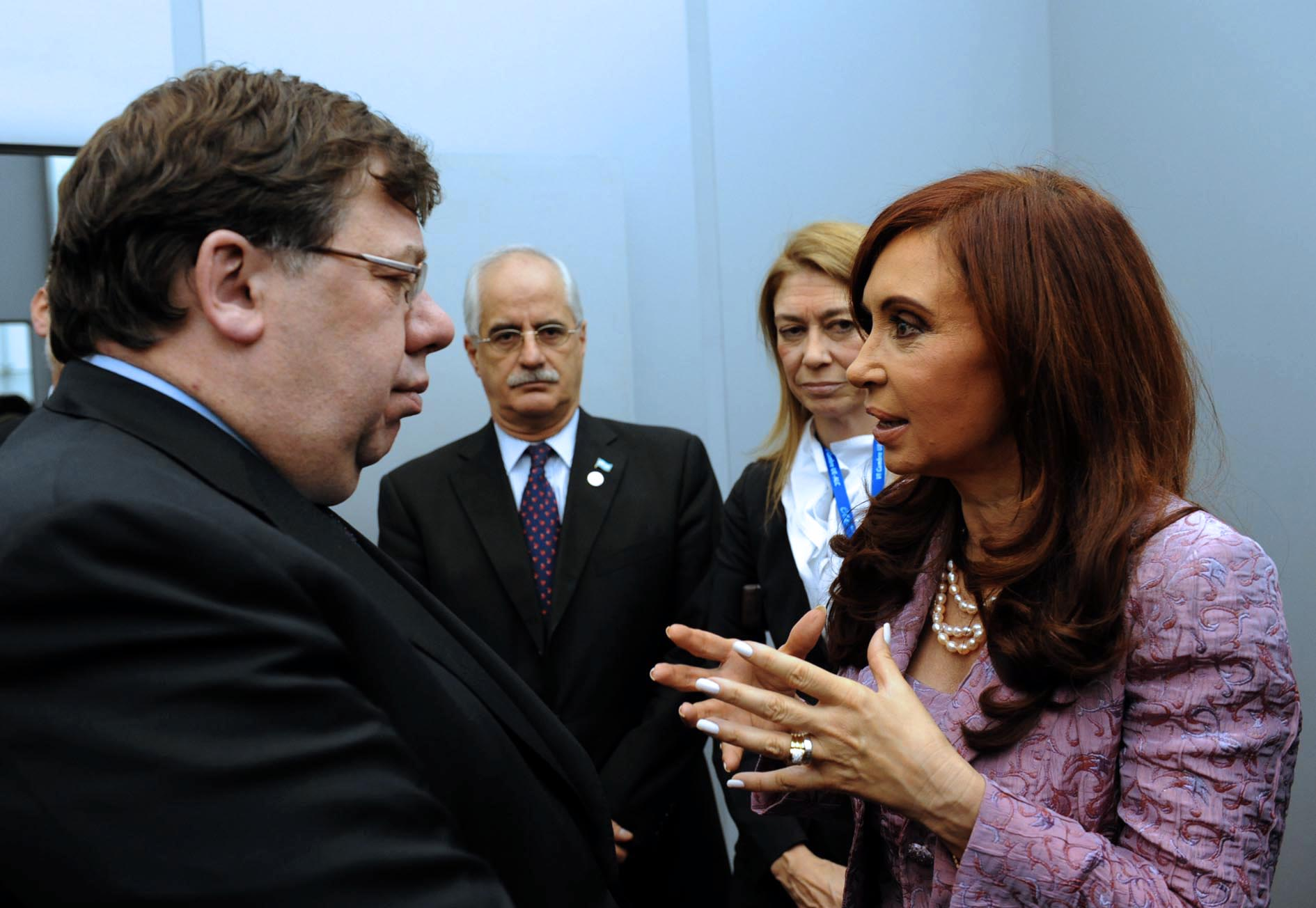
Cowen meeting with Argentine President Cristina Fernandez in 2010.

Cowen's government's third budget within 14 months, delivered on 9 December 2009, saw the government facing the reality of the country nearly becoming insolvent. The 2010 Budget was described by commentators in Ireland and around the world in unusually harsh terms as €4 billion was removed from the country's national deficit; The Irish Times labelled it "the most austere Budget in the history of the State". It was characterised by pay cuts for public sector workers and cuts in social welfare. According to the BBC, social welfare cuts had not been implemented by the country since 1924. The cuts prompted at least one angry outburst in Dáil Éireann.

In February 2010, Cowen defended his claim that the National Asset Management Agency (NAMA) would increase the supply of credit into the economy despite the International Monetary Fund (IMF), saying it would not lead to any significant increase. "People should contemplate what level of credit accessibility we'd have in this economy without NAMA," he said. "It's not just sufficient in itself obviously for credit flow, it's certainly an important and necessary part of restructuring our banking system, of that there's no doubt, in terms of improving as a location for funding of banking operations," said Cowen. He previously said that the Government's objective in restructuring the banks through NAMA was to "generate more access to credit for Irish business at this critical time". In September 2009, the Minister for Finance, Brian Lenihan, expressed a similar view, saying it would lead to more lending for businesses and households. Cowen was responding to reports published on 8 February, that the IMF had told Brian Lenihan in April 2009, that the NAMA would not lead to a significant increase in lending by the banks.

The comments, which appear in internal Department of Finance documents released under the Freedom of Information Act, were made by senior IMF official, Steven Seelig, who was to join the board of NAMA in May 2010. Minutes of a private meeting at the department between Brian Lenihan and IMF officials on 29 April 2009, state that the "IMF (Mr. Seelig) do not believe that Nama will result in significant increase in bank lending in Ireland". The Government has maintained that NAMA's purchase of bad loans from the banks with State bonds would increase the flow of credit in the economy since the plan was unveiled in April 2009. Speaking at the publication of the NAMA legislation in September 2009, Mr Lenihan said it would "strengthen and improve" the funding positions of the banks "so that they can lend to viable businesses and households". The IMF estimated in their published report that domestic banks would face losses of up to €35 billion, though the department pointed out this would be partly funded from operating profits and provisions already taken against some loan losses.

=== Second no confidence vote ===
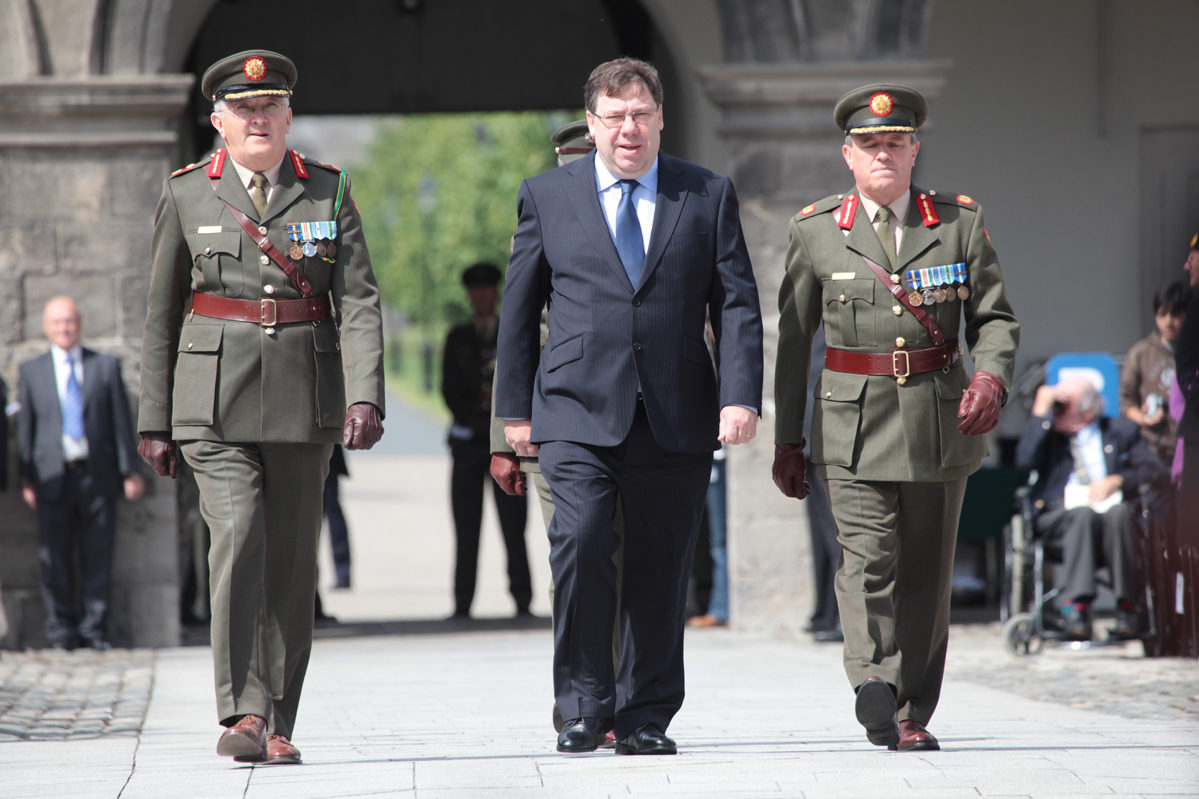
Cowen arriving at the 2010 National Day of Commemoration

Speaking on RTÉ on 15 May 2010, Cowen said that, in hindsight, he should have introduced a property tax to cool the property boom. Responding to the Taoiseach's defence of his actions as minister for finance, the Leader of the Opposition Enda Kenny accused him of "washing his hands" of his role in Ireland's economic crisis. Speaking during a front bench meeting in Cork, Kenny also claimed Fianna Fáil was spreading fear by considering cuts to the old age pension. "Sorry is a word that Fianna Fáil does not recognise, they don't understand," Kenny told party colleagues. Kenny said Taoiseach Cowen, in defending his handling of events, was refusing to acknowledge that he drove the economy "up on the rocks" for four years when he was Minister for Finance. "He expects everybody else to accept responsibility for it but not him. It's another example of hands being washed by those in charge, a refusal to accept responsibility for their part in destroying the Irish economy and heaping economic woes . . . upon so many people." The Fine Gael leader said the best thing the Taoiseach could do was to hold the three pending by-elections or a general election, so the people could have their say.

On 15 June 2010, Cowen faced his second no-confidence motion in just over a year, tabled by Fine Gael after the publication of two reports that criticised government policies in the run-up to Ireland's banking crisis. He again survived the motion, 82–77.

=== EU and IMF rescue ===
On the evening of 21 November 2010, Cowen confirmed that Ireland had formally requested financial support from the European Union's European Financial Stability Facility (EFSF) and the International Monetary Fund (IMF), after long resisting pressure from other eurozone nations, particularly France and Germany. On 28 November 2010, the European Commission agreed to an €85 billion rescue deal of which €22.5 billion from the European Financial Stability Mechanism (EFSM), €22.5 billion from the IMF, €22.5 billion from the European Financial Stability Facility (EFSF) and bilateral loans from the United Kingdom, Denmark and Sweden. The remaining €17.5 billion will come from a state contribution from the National Pension Reserve Fund (NPRF) and other domestic cash resources.

The bailout was widely seen in Ireland as a national humiliation, and by some as a betrayal of the long-fought struggle for Irish independence whose legacy forms a major part of the Irish identity. The Irish Times editorialized:

whether this is what the men of 1916 died for: a bailout from the German chancellor with a few shillings of sympathy from the British chancellor on the side. There is the shame of it all. Having obtained our political independence from Britain to be the masters of our own affairs, we have now surrendered our sovereignty to the European Commission, the European Central Bank, and the International Monetary Fund.

On 24 November 2010, Cowen unveiled a four-year plan to stabilise the economy by 2014. The plan was met with great protest as it included deeply unpopular elements, including drastic cuts in social welfare, the lowering of the minimum wage, and an increase in the value added tax while maintaining the state's low corporate tax rate. In recognition of the political disaster this would inflict on his government, Cowen indicated that the election would take place in early 2011 after the 2011 budgetary process has been completed, though at the time he would not set a specific date.

== Fall from power ==
=== Meeting with Seán FitzPatrick ===
It was revealed following the publication of the book, The Fitzpatrick Tapes by Tom Lyons and Brian Carey, that two previously undisclosed contacts had occurred between Seán FitzPatrick, the Chairman of Anglo Irish Bank, and Brian Cowen.

The first of these was a telephone call in March 2008, while Cowen was overseas in Vietnam and when Cowen was then Minister of Finance. The second, which was a meeting, took place on 28 July 2008, at Druids Glen, County Wicklow.

At that time Anglo Irish Bank was badly affected by the downturn in the property market. On 28 September 2008, the Irish government decided to introduce a bank guarantee to cover Anglo Irish Bank, Allied Irish Banks and Bank of Ireland. Seán FitzPatrick was forced to resign in January 2009, over the Anglo Irish Bank hidden loans controversy. The meeting, over seven hours, took place over a round of golf and a subsequent dinner with Fitzpatrick and two other directors of Anglo Irish Bank.

During a heated Leader's Question session in Dáil Éireann, which ran over the allotted time considerably, Cowen denied that Anglo Irish Bank had been discussed. However, when questioned by the Sinn Féin Dáil leader Caoimhghín Ó Caoláin (who had been attending a wedding at the hotel and by chance had encountered Cowen and Fitzpatrick), Cowen was forced to admit that there were two other people at the meeting, Gary McGann, a director of Anglo Irish Bank and Alan Gray, a director of the Central Bank and currently managing director of a consultancy company Indecon. Brian Cowen has claimed that the meeting was a social event, while Gray has stated that he was invited to provide economic advice on stimulating the economy. Tánaiste Mary Coughlan, described the purpose of the meeting as a fundraiser for Fianna Fáil.

Cowen subsequently threatened to sue Caoimhghín Ó Caoláin, if he repeated the accusation outside the Dáil. Ó Caoláin responded by repeating the accusation in public and inviting Cowen to take him to court.

=== January cabinet reshuffle ===
In the stir created by the revelations of Cowen's meetings with Fitzpatrick, Labour Party leader Eamon Gilmore, announced his plan to table a third motion of no confidence in Cowen's government. At the time, however, Cowen's more immediate concern was pressure from within his party to step down as leader of Fianna Fáil. Cowen announced on 16 January 2011, that he would not resign as party leader of his own accord; however, he would put down a motion of confidence in his leadership at Fianna Fáil's parliamentary party meeting on 18 January 2011, to be decided by secret ballot. Foreign Minister Micheál Martin, publicly announced that he would vote against the motion, effectively presenting himself as a challenger to Cowen's leadership. On the evening of 18 January 2011, Government Chief Whip John Curran, announced that Cowen had prevailed in the confidence vote, although the exact counts were to remain secret and the ballots had been shredded. Cowen also announced that he had "reluctantly" accepted Martin's resignation from his government.

The following day, however, Cowen forced the resignations of four more Ministers, Noel Dempsey, Dermot Ahern, Tony Killeen and Mary Harney; the day after that, another Minister, Batt O'Keefe, resigned. The Ministers who resigned had already declined to contest the 2011 general election. The resignations were engineered to allow Cowen to appoint new Ministers, who might strengthen his party's position for the election. However, the junior coalition partner, the Green Party, expressed outrage that they had not been consulted about the reshuffle. The Greens accordingly refused to endorse Cowen's intended replacements, forcing Cowen to reassign the vacant portfolios to incumbent Ministers. The Green Party also threatened to pull out of the government unless Cowen set a firm date for the general election; Cowen subsequently announced it would take place on 11 March 2011. When Cowen addressed the Dáil to announce the reshuffle, the Green Party were absent and had not taken their seats in the Dáil that day. The Independent later concluded that the failed reshuffle left Cowen "an isolated, hugely damaged figure".

Moreover, Green Party leader John Gormley publicly stated that trust between the coalition parties had been greatly eroded, perhaps irreparably. At that point, members of Fianna Fáil, including many of those who had previously announced support for Cowen in the party's confidence motion, began questioning his leadership and pressing for his resignation from the leadership of the party before the election. The press, meanwhile, compared the attempted reshuffle and its fallout to the GUBU political disaster of the early 1980s Charles Haughey government, up to that point the most sensational political scandal in the history of Ireland. Fianna Fáil, already at a record low 14% approval rating, slid in the wake of the botched reshuffle to 8%.

=== Resignation as leader ===
Faced with a fractured coalition, rebellion within his party, and an acknowledged public relations disaster, Cowen announced his resignation as leader of Fianna Fáil on 22 January 2011. He insisted, however, that he would continue as Taoiseach under a caretaking government, until the election, to complete legislation for the 2011 budget.

The resignation did not quell the consequences of Cowen's actions. Labour leader Eamon Gilmore announced that he would go forward with his no-confidence motion on Wednesday, 26 January 2011. Opposition Leader Kenny also announced that if Cowen did not ask President Mary McAleese for an immediate dissolution of the Dáil, his party would table a no-confidence motion in the Taoiseach on Tuesday, ahead of Labour's motion. Then, on Sunday the 23rd, less than 24 hours after Cowen announced his resignation, the Greens tore up the coalition agreement and pulled its two ministers, Gormley and Eamon Ryan, from the government. Cowen accepted their resignations. This left Cowen at the head of a minority government, with seven Ministers (the absolute minimum mandated by the constitution of Ireland), and facing two consecutive no-confidence votes in the Dáil.

=== Finance Bill, dissolution and retirement ===
On 24 January 2011, Finance Minister Brian Lenihan met with delegations from Fine Gael, Labour, and the Greens, striking a final deal. Labour and Fine Gael agreed to drop their no-confidence motions in exchange for an agreement that the finance bill would be finalised in the Dáil by Friday the 28th (with the Seanad to finalise on Saturday), upon which Cowen would immediately request that President McAleese dissolve the Dáil.

The Dáil passed the finance bill on 27 January 2011, with the Seanad following on 29 January. Accordingly, Cowen asked McAleese to dissolve the Dáil on 1 February 2011. Following Irish constitutional practice, McAleese duly granted the dissolution. Cowen subsequently confirmed that the general election would be brought forward to 25 February 2011. Cowen also announced that he would retire from politics and not contest the Dáil seat he had held for 27 years.

The pent-up resentment at Cowen's government resulted in a debacle for Fianna Fáil at the general election. The party suffered the worst defeat of a sitting government in the history of the Irish state, falling to only 20 seats for third place—the first time since 1927 that it was not the largest party in the chamber. The Greens fared even worse; they were swept out of the chamber altogether. Cowen was succeeded by Leader of the Opposition Enda Kenny as Taoiseach, leading a Fine Gael-Labour coalition, which took office on 9 March 2011. As Cowen was no longer a TD when the new Dáil convened, he was unable to preside over the opening, and Fianna Fáil Leader Micheál Martin and outgoing Finance Minister Brian Lenihan appeared on the government front bench in his place.

== Public image ==
Cowen was often referred to in Irish satirical and tabloid media as Biffo, a nickname applied to people from Offaly. Biffo is an acronym for "Big Ignorant Fecker/Fucker From Offaly". Cowen has said that Biffo stands for "Beautiful Intelligent Fellow From Offaly'. An unnamed journalist described Cowen "as subtle as a JCB".

WikiLeaks cables from Ireland to the US revealed that US diplomats in Ireland believed that the nickname BIFFO applied "especially well" to Cowen. In a candid profile from WikiLeaks of Cowen as the Taoiseach and Fianna Fáil leader, then US Ambassador Thomas Foley described Cowen as "burly and brusque" saying that he had "a reputation of not being much concerned with his public image." The Ambassador also described Mr Cowen's fondness for frequenting pubs and singing, saying he would likely be more approachable than his predecessor Bertie Ahern.

Cowen was accused of "conduct unbecoming", over comments he made in the Dáil when, at the end of a heated exchange, he sat down and spoke to Tánaiste Mary Coughlan; Dáil microphones picked up the Taoiseach using the word "fuckers", though he was not referring to any opposition politician. He later apologised for his remark.

Cowen has been openly criticised by his parliamentary party colleagues including one who said in an interview that Cowen has suffered from "poor communications and consultation" and expressed concern about the emergence of a perceived "triumvirate" (comprising the Taoiseach, Tánaiste and Minister for Finance) within the Cabinet.

In a novel criticism, artist and teacher Conor Casby placed unflattering nude portraits of Cowen in the National Gallery of Ireland and the gallery of the Royal Hibernian Academy. The pictures were reported in a television news bulletin and caused considerable debate in the media.

Cowen was criticised as being inept during the approach to the third budget, in December 2009. He said, "Our priority is to stabilise the public finances", a year after the Irish public was told that this was the priority for 2008.

=== Morning Ireland interview ===
On 14 September 2010, after an interview on RTÉ's Morning Ireland, Cowen was described by Deputy Simon Coveney of Fine Gael as sounding as if he was intoxicated or hungover. The interview was on the morning of day two of his party's annual pre-Dáil meeting held at the Ardilaun Hotel in Galway. Cowen rejected the allegations, describing them as "pathetic". However, this incident has been unfavourably commented upon by the international press, and dubbed "Gargle gate" by the domestic media. A brief sketch about Cowen that appeared on a subsequent episode of the American talk show The Tonight Show With Jay Leno, in which host Jay Leno described Cowen as a "drunken moron" and acted with incredulity towards his status as Taoiseach, received coverage in the Irish media and further damaged Cowen's public image.

He apologised for his interview performance the following day saying, "It wasn't my best performance and I would like to apologise for that. I would hate to think the reputation of the country or the office of Taoiseach would in any way be affected by what I had to say." He claimed that there was a hoarseness in his voice and denied that he had been hungover. His version of this event was substantiated in 2017, by his interviewer who stated that Cowen was weary and not drunk or hungover.

=== Approval ratings ===
When Cowen took office, his approval rating was at 52%. At the time, he was considered a local and national hero. After his first 100 days however, Cowen's approval rating slipped to 27%, marking the first time a Taoiseach's popularity declined significantly since the creation of the post in 1937. By the beginning of 2009, his approval rating hovered at 24%; then it fell to 18%, and later that year, was at 15%.

At the end of 2009, Cowen's approval rating recovered to 22%, before rising to 26% when 2010 began. Nevertheless, his approval rating fell back down to 18% later that year. By the end of 2010, Cowen's approval rating was at 14% with nine out of ten Irish people wanting him out. After a cabinet shuffle in January 2011 failed to improve the government's popularity, Cowen's approval rating reached its lowest point of just 8%, creeping up to 10% shortly before he left office.

As of August 2010, despite being very unpopular at home, Cowen was listed as one of the top ten leaders in the world by Newsweek magazine, which praised his handling of the Irish economy. While The Wall Street Journal stated that "Cowen has presided over the worst economic crisis in modern times", Newsweek ranked him fifth in the world after David Cameron, Mohamed Nasheed, Nicolas Sarkozy, and Wen Jiabao.

TheJournal.ie announced that Cowen was "the least popular incumbent in the history of [Irish] opinion polling," with approval ratings at between 8 and 10 per cent of the electorate. As of January 2011, Fianna Fáil's popularity had fallen to a record low and was tied with Sinn Féin on 14% in joint third place.

In an Amarách Research poll conducted in 2016, respondents were asked to opt who between Cowen, his predecessor Ahern, and his successor Kenny, was the best Taoiseach. 55% named Kenny, 31% Ahern and only 14% Cowen.

== Legacy and later life ==
Cowen became leader of Fianna Fáil and Taoiseach without ever facing an election in either capacity; he is the only Fianna Fáil leader to have left the post without ever taking the party into an election. Under his stewardship of the country, his party Fianna Fáil, saw its electoral support base diminished by 75% in the general election of February 2011, as a reaction to the intervention, in the running of the Irish economy, of the International Monetary Fund and the European Central Bank in November 2010.

Cowen was criticised for being a poor communicator and for his perceived failure to connect with the electorate. Historian Diarmaid Ferriter described Cowen's "appalling communication skills and self-destructive stubbornness" as inflicting most damage to Fianna Fáil.

As the scale of the party's electoral defeat became evident, Cowen accepted responsibility for decisions taken in government.

"From my point of view as Taoiseach and as a Minister in the past I take full responsibility. I've never quibbled or suggested otherwise."

In November 2011, a review of Cowen's governance was broadcast on RTÉ television over two episodes entitled Crisis: Inside the Cowen Government. Cowen did not contribute to the series, but many of his former ministerial colleagues critiqued his performance as Taoiseach. On 21 March 2012, Cowen delivered a speech at the BMW Center for German and European Studies at Georgetown University, Washington, D.C., entitled "The Euro: From Crisis to Resolution? Some Reflections from Ireland on the Road Thus Far". In his first public comments since leaving office, he defended his government's blanket bank guarantee in 2008, but admitted that his government should have increased taxes and cut spending. He also admitted that his government should accept some blame for Ireland's economic downfall. He compared the start of the 2008 economic crisis to a series of plane crashes, all taking place at the same time and each for different reasons. He receives annual pension payments of over €150,000.

In May 2014, Cowen became part of the board of Topaz Energy. He was appointed to the board of Beacon Hospital in February 2015.

In April 2015, Cowen was attacked by protesters in Dublin, in which he was called a "scumbag" and a "traitor".

In July 2017, Cowen was conferred with an honorary doctorate from the National University of Ireland, an honour bestowed on all but two former Taoisigh. During his 50-minute acceptance speech he criticised the EU for its behaviour towards Ireland during the 2008 financial crisis and expressed regret that so many jobs were lost during the recession. Following the conferring ceremony, the NUI faced considerable public criticism for deciding to make the award to Cowen. Former (and founding) President of the University of Limerick, Ed Walsh, announced that he would hand back his honorary doctorate in protest, and did so on 14 November 2018.

On 5 July 2019, Cowen was admitted to Beacon Hospital after suffering a major brain haemorrhage. He was then transferred to St. Vincent's University Hospital where he spent five months before transferring to a physical rehabilitation facility. He spent over a year in hospital and used a wheelchair in rare public appearances. His first major interview was on Midlands 103 radio in July 2023, in which he said three quarters of those who experienced his type of haemorrhage died, and that he had "made a great recovery mentally" but "the physical side of things is slower".

== See also ==
- Families in the Oireachtas

Political offices
Preceded by Michael O'Kennedy	Minister for Labour; 1992–1993	Succeeded by Mervyn Taylor
Preceded by Albert Reynolds	Minister for Energy; 1993	Succeeded by Charlie McCreevy
Preceded by Charlie McCreevy	Minister for Transport, Energy and Communications; 1993–1994	Succeeded by Michael Lowry
Preceded by Michael Noonan	Minister for Health and Children; 1997–2000	Succeeded by Micheál Martin
Preceded by David Andrews	Minister for Foreign Affairs; 2000–2004	Succeeded by Dermot Ahern
Preceded by Charlie McCreevy	Minister for Finance; 2004–2008	Succeeded by Brian Lenihan
Preceded by Michael McDowell	Tánaiste; 2007–2008	Succeeded by Mary Coughlan
Preceded by Bertie Ahern	Taoiseach; 2008–2011	Succeeded by Enda Kenny
Preceded by Micheál Martin	Minister for Foreign Affairs; 2011	Succeeded by Eamon Gilmore
Honorary titles
Preceded by Ivan Yates	Baby of the Dáil; 1984–1987	Succeeded by Mary Coughlan
Party political offices
Preceded by Mary O'Rourke	Deputy leader of Fianna Fáil; 2002–2008	Succeeded by Mary Coughlan
Preceded by Bertie Ahern	Leader of Fianna Fáil; 2008–2011	Succeeded by Micheál Martin

Dáil	Election	Deputy (Party)	Deputy (Party)	Deputy (Party)	Deputy (Party)	Deputy (Party)
2nd	1921	Joseph Lynch (SF)	Patrick McCartan (SF)	Francis Bulfin (SF)	Kevin O'Higgins (SF)	4 seats 1921–1923
3rd	1922	William Davin (Lab)	Patrick McCartan (PT-SF)	Francis Bulfin (PT-SF)	Kevin O'Higgins (PT-SF)	4 seats 1921–1923
4th	1923	William Davin (Lab)	Laurence Brady (Rep)	Francis Bulfin (CnaG)	Patrick Egan (CnaG)	Seán McGuinness (Rep)
4th	1926 by-election	William Davin (Lab)	Laurence Brady (Rep)	Francis Bulfin (CnaG)	Patrick Egan (CnaG)	James Dwyer (CnaG)
5th	1927 (Jun)	William Davin (Lab)	Patrick Boland (FF)	Thomas Tynan (FF)	John Gill (Lab)	James Dwyer (CnaG)
6th	1927 (Sep)	William Davin (Lab)	Patrick Boland (FF)	Patrick Gorry (FF)	William Aird (CnaG)	James Dwyer (CnaG)
7th	1932	William Davin (Lab)	Patrick Boland (FF)	Patrick Gorry (FF)	Thomas F. O'Higgins (CnaG)	Eugene O'Brien (CnaG)
8th	1933	William Davin (Lab)	Patrick Boland (FF)	Eamon Donnelly (FF)	Thomas F. O'Higgins (CnaG)	Jack Finlay (NCP)
9th	1937	William Davin (Lab)	Patrick Boland (FF)	Patrick Gorry (FF)	Thomas F. O'Higgins (FG)	Jack Finlay (FG)
10th	1938	William Davin (Lab)	Patrick Boland (FF)	Patrick Gorry (FF)	Thomas F. O'Higgins (FG)	Daniel Hogan (FF)
11th	1943	William Davin (Lab)	Patrick Boland (FF)	Patrick Gorry (FF)	Thomas F. O'Higgins (FG)	Oliver J. Flanagan (IMR)
12th	1944	William Davin (Lab)	Patrick Boland (FF)	Patrick Gorry (FF)	Thomas F. O'Higgins (FG)	Oliver J. Flanagan (IMR)
13th	1948	William Davin (Lab)	Patrick Boland (FF)	Patrick Gorry (FF)	Tom O'Higgins, Jnr (FG)	Oliver J. Flanagan (Ind.)
14th	1951	William Davin (Lab)	Patrick Boland (FF)	Peadar Maher (FF)	Tom O'Higgins, Jnr (FG)	Oliver J. Flanagan (Ind.)
15th	1954	William Davin (Lab)	Nicholas Egan (FF)	Peadar Maher (FF)	Tom O'Higgins, Jnr (FG)	Oliver J. Flanagan (FG)
15th	1956 by-election	Kieran Egan (FF)	Nicholas Egan (FF)	Peadar Maher (FF)	Tom O'Higgins, Jnr (FG)	Oliver J. Flanagan (FG)
16th	1957	Kieran Egan (FF)	Nicholas Egan (FF)	Peadar Maher (FF)	Tom O'Higgins, Jnr (FG)	Oliver J. Flanagan (FG)
17th	1961	Kieran Egan (FF)	Nicholas Egan (FF)	Patrick Lalor (FF)	Tom O'Higgins, Jnr (FG)	Oliver J. Flanagan (FG)
18th	1965	Henry Byrne (Lab)	Nicholas Egan (FF)	Patrick Lalor (FF)	Tom O'Higgins, Jnr (FG)	Oliver J. Flanagan (FG)
19th	1969	Ger Connolly (FF)	Bernard Cowen (FF)	Patrick Lalor (FF)	Tom Enright (FG)	Oliver J. Flanagan (FG)
20th	1973	Ger Connolly (FF)	Charles McDonald (FG)	Patrick Lalor (FF)	Tom Enright (FG)	Oliver J. Flanagan (FG)
21st	1977	Ger Connolly (FF)	Bernard Cowen (FF)	Patrick Lalor (FF)	Tom Enright (FG)	Oliver J. Flanagan (FG)
22nd	1981	Ger Connolly (FF)	Bernard Cowen (FF)	Liam Hyland (FF)	Tom Enright (FG)	Oliver J. Flanagan (FG)
23rd	1982 (Feb)	Ger Connolly (FF)	Bernard Cowen (FF)	Liam Hyland (FF)	Tom Enright (FG)	Oliver J. Flanagan (FG)
24th	1982 (Nov)	Ger Connolly (FF)	Bernard Cowen (FF)	Liam Hyland (FF)	Tom Enright (FG)	Oliver J. Flanagan (FG)
24th	1984 by-election	Ger Connolly (FF)	Brian Cowen (FF)	Liam Hyland (FF)	Tom Enright (FG)	Oliver J. Flanagan (FG)
25th	1987	Ger Connolly (FF)	Brian Cowen (FF)	Liam Hyland (FF)	Tom Enright (FG)	Charles Flanagan (FG)
26th	1989	Ger Connolly (FF)	Brian Cowen (FF)	Liam Hyland (FF)	Tom Enright (FG)	Charles Flanagan (FG)
27th	1992	Ger Connolly (FF)	Brian Cowen (FF)	Liam Hyland (FF)	Pat Gallagher (Lab)	Charles Flanagan (FG)
28th	1997	John Moloney (FF)	Brian Cowen (FF)	Seán Fleming (FF)	Tom Enright (FG)	Charles Flanagan (FG)
29th	2002	John Moloney (FF)	Brian Cowen (FF)	Seán Fleming (FF)	Olwyn Enright (FG)	Tom Parlon (PDs)
30th	2007	John Moloney (FF)	Brian Cowen (FF)	Seán Fleming (FF)	Olwyn Enright (FG)	Charles Flanagan (FG)
31st	2011	Brian Stanley (SF)	Barry Cowen (FF)	Seán Fleming (FF)	Marcella Corcoran Kennedy (FG)	Charles Flanagan (FG)
32nd	2016	Constituency abolished. See Laois and Offaly.				
33rd	2020	Brian Stanley (SF)	Barry Cowen (FF)	Seán Fleming (FF)	Carol Nolan (Ind.)	Charles Flanagan (FG)
33rd	2024	Brian Stanley (SF)	(Vacant)	Seán Fleming (FF)	Carol Nolan (Ind.)	Charles Flanagan (FG)
34th	2024	Constituency abolished. See Laois and Offaly.				
