= 2011 Fianna Fáil leadership election =

Political party leadership election in Ireland

- 26 January 2011
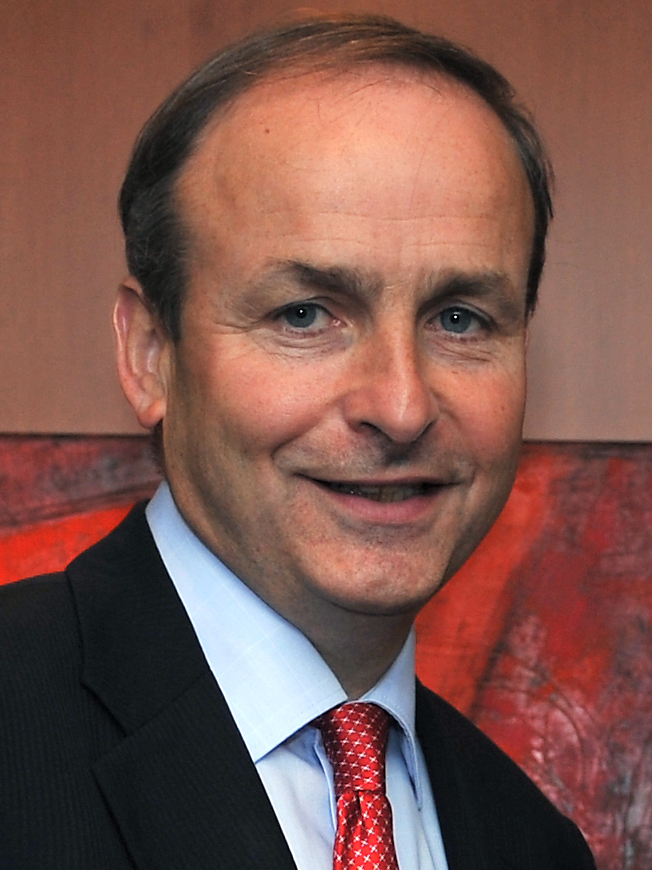

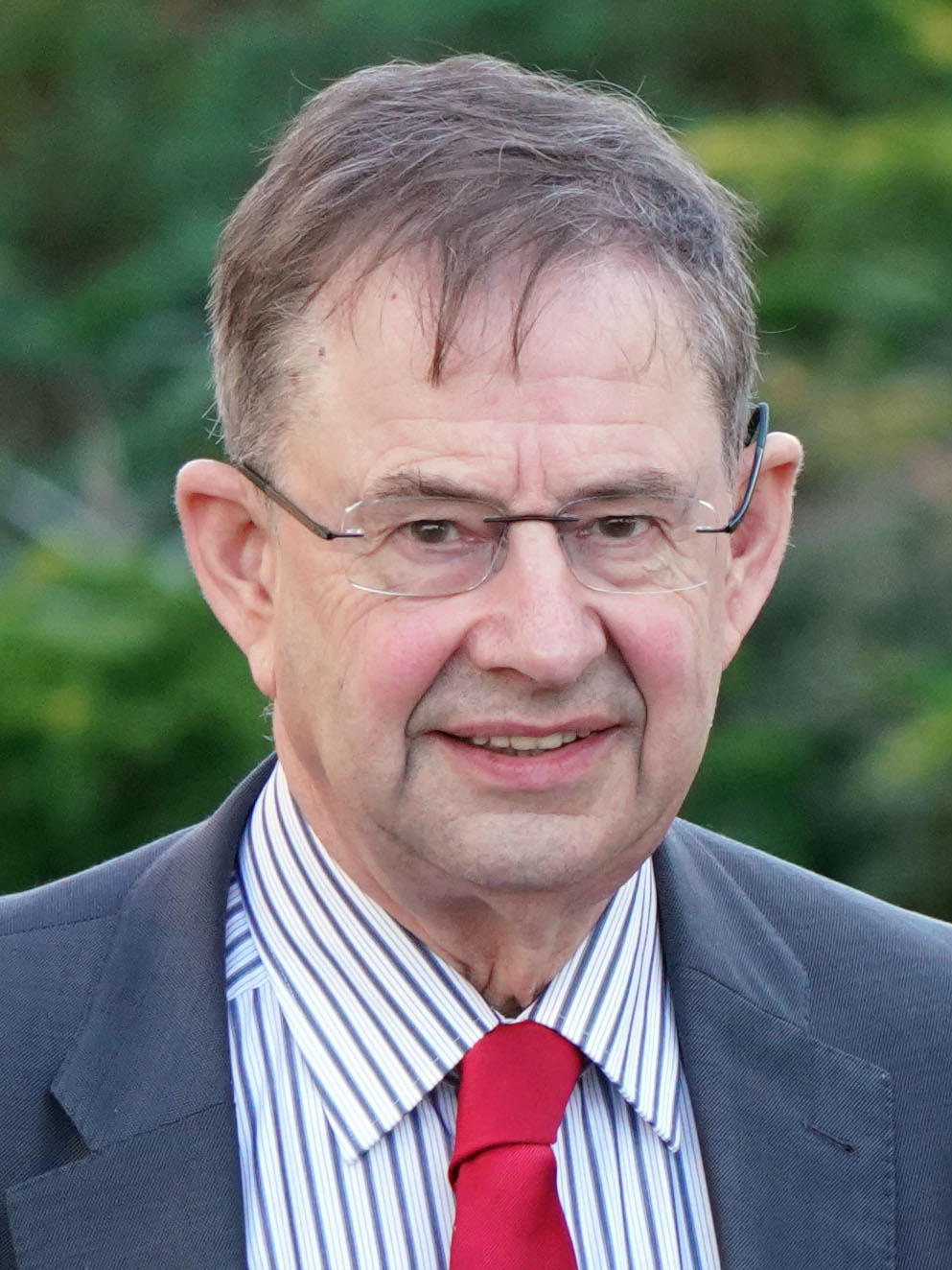

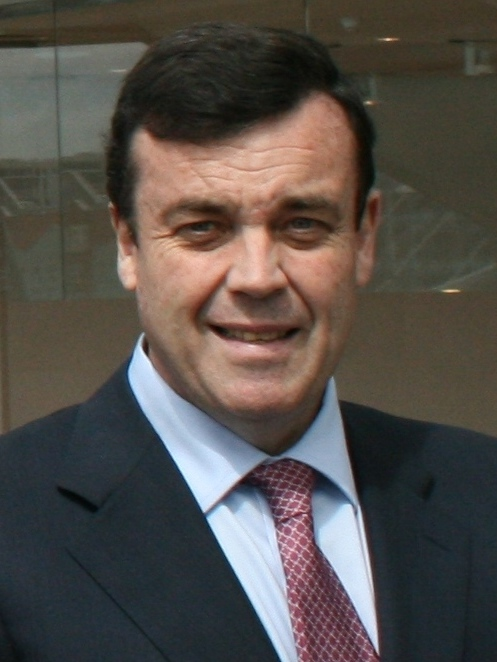

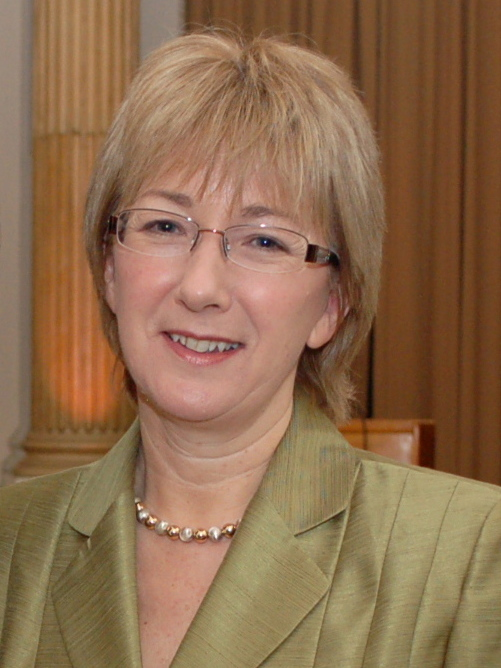
Candidate	Micheál Martin	Éamon Ó Cuív
1st preference	33 / 72	15 / 72
2nd count	36 / 72	18 / 72
Final count	50 / 72	22 / 72
Candidate	Brian Lenihan Jnr	Mary Hanafin
1st preference	14 / 72	10 / 72
2nd count	18 / 72
Leader before election
Brian Cowen
Elected Leader
Micheál Martin

The 2011 Fianna Fáil leadership election was called by party leader Brian Cowen on 22 January 2011, when he announced that he was resigning as president and leader of the party. He remained as Taoiseach until after the 2011 general election.

The deadline for nominations closed at 1 p.m. on 24 January, and the new leader was elected at a special Fianna Fáil parliamentary party meeting on 26 January. Micheál Martin was elected as the party's eighth leader.

== Candidates ==
=== Standing ===
- Mary Hanafin – Minister for Tourism, Culture and Sport and Minister for Enterprise, Trade and Innovation
- Brian Lenihan Jnr – Minister for Finance
- Micheál Martin – former Minister for Foreign Affairs
- Éamon Ó Cuív – Minister for Social Protection, Minister for Defence and Minister for the Environment, Heritage and Local Government

=== Declined to stand ===
- Conor Lenihan – Minister of State for Science, Technology, Innovation and Natural Resources

== Results ==
Election: 26 January 2011
Candidate	1st count	2nd count	3rd count
Micheál Martin	33	36	50
Éamon Ó Cuív	15	18	22
Brian Lenihan Jnr	14	18	–
Mary Hanafin	10	–	–
Result: Micheál Martin elected leader.

Only TDs who were members of the Fianna Fáil parliamentary party were eligible to vote. Jimmy Devins rejoined the parliamentary party on 25 January, a day before the leadership election, bringing the total number of eligible voters to 72.

RTÉ News reported that Martin had received 33 first preference votes, compared to Ó Cuív's 15, Lenihan's 14 and Hanafin's 10; it added that the election ended on the third count, with Ó Cuív the runner-up. When Hanafin had been eliminated and her votes redistributed, Ó Cuív and Lenihan were equal on 18 votes each; Lenihan was then eliminated, having received fewer first preferences.
