= 2008 Fianna Fáil leadership election =

Political party leadership election in Ireland

← 1994	9 April 2008	2011 →
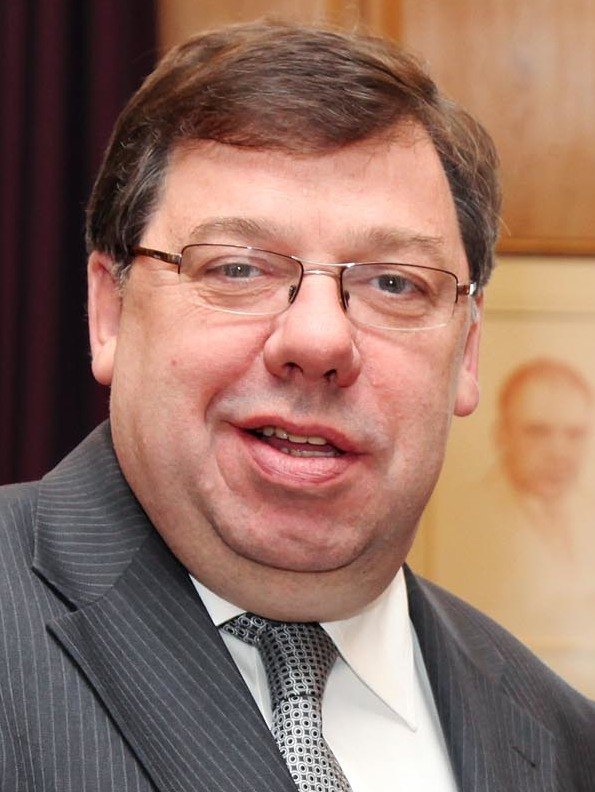
Candidate	Brian Cowen
Percentage	Unopposed
Leader before election
Bertie Ahern
Elected Leader
Brian Cowen

The 2008 Fianna Fáil leadership election began on 2 April 2008, when party leader and Taoiseach Bertie Ahern announced his resignation. Brian Cowen, the Tánaiste and Minister for Finance was the clear favourite to succeed him.

== Candidates ==
=== Standing ===
- Brian Cowen – Tánaiste and Minister for Finance

=== Declined to stand ===
- Dermot Ahern – Minister for Foreign Affairs
- Mary Hanafin – Minister for Education and Science
- Micheál Martin – Minister for Enterprise, Trade and Employment
- Brian Lenihan – Minister for Justice, Equality and Law Reform

== Outcome ==
On 2 April Mary Hanafin declined to comment on whether she would be standing for the leadership and Brian Lenihan had ruled himself out of the race. By 4 April all of the Fianna Fáil cabinet ministers had declared their support for the candidacy of Brian Cowen. No other candidate emerged, and Cowen was elected unopposed as the seventh leader of Fianna Fáil on 9 April 2008.
