= 1994 Fianna Fáil leadership election =

Political party leadership election in Ireland

← 1992	19 December 1994	2008 →
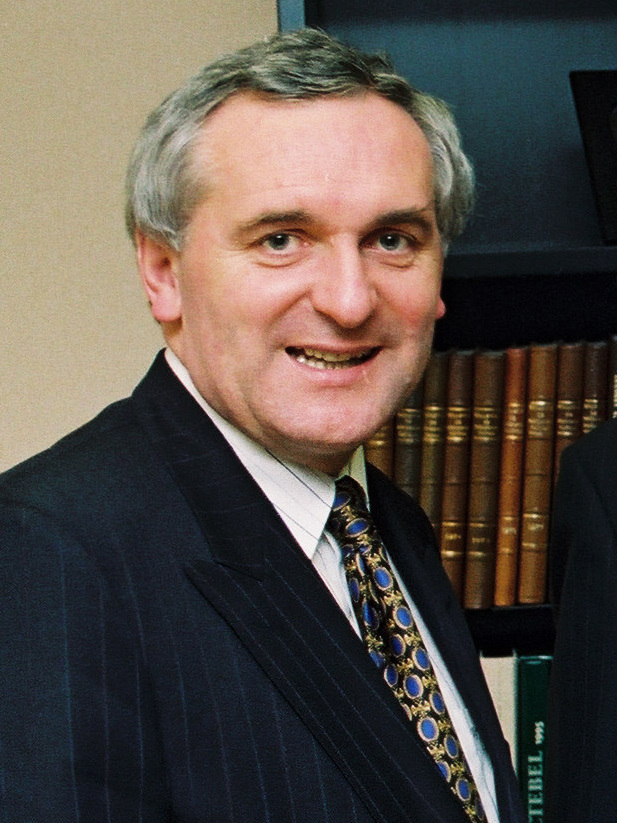
Candidate	Bertie Ahern
Percentage	Unopposed
Leader before election
Albert Reynolds
Elected Leader
Bertie Ahern

The 1994 Fianna Fáil leadership election began in November 1994, when Albert Reynolds resigned as party leader and Taoiseach. Reynolds had been party leader since February 1992 and had served as Taoiseach since then. His successor was elected by the members of the Fianna Fáil parliamentary party on 19 December 1994. Bertie Ahern was the only candidate to stand at the time of the election and was thus elected leader, the first to be unanimously elected since Seán Lemass in 1959.

== Candidates ==
=== Standing ===
- Bertie Ahern, Minister for Finance

=== Withdrew ===
- Máire Geoghegan-Quinn, Minister for Justice - originally sought candidature, but subsequently withdrew.
