= Government of the 24th Dáil =

Government of Ireland from 1982 to 1987

19th government of Ireland
- Government of Ireland

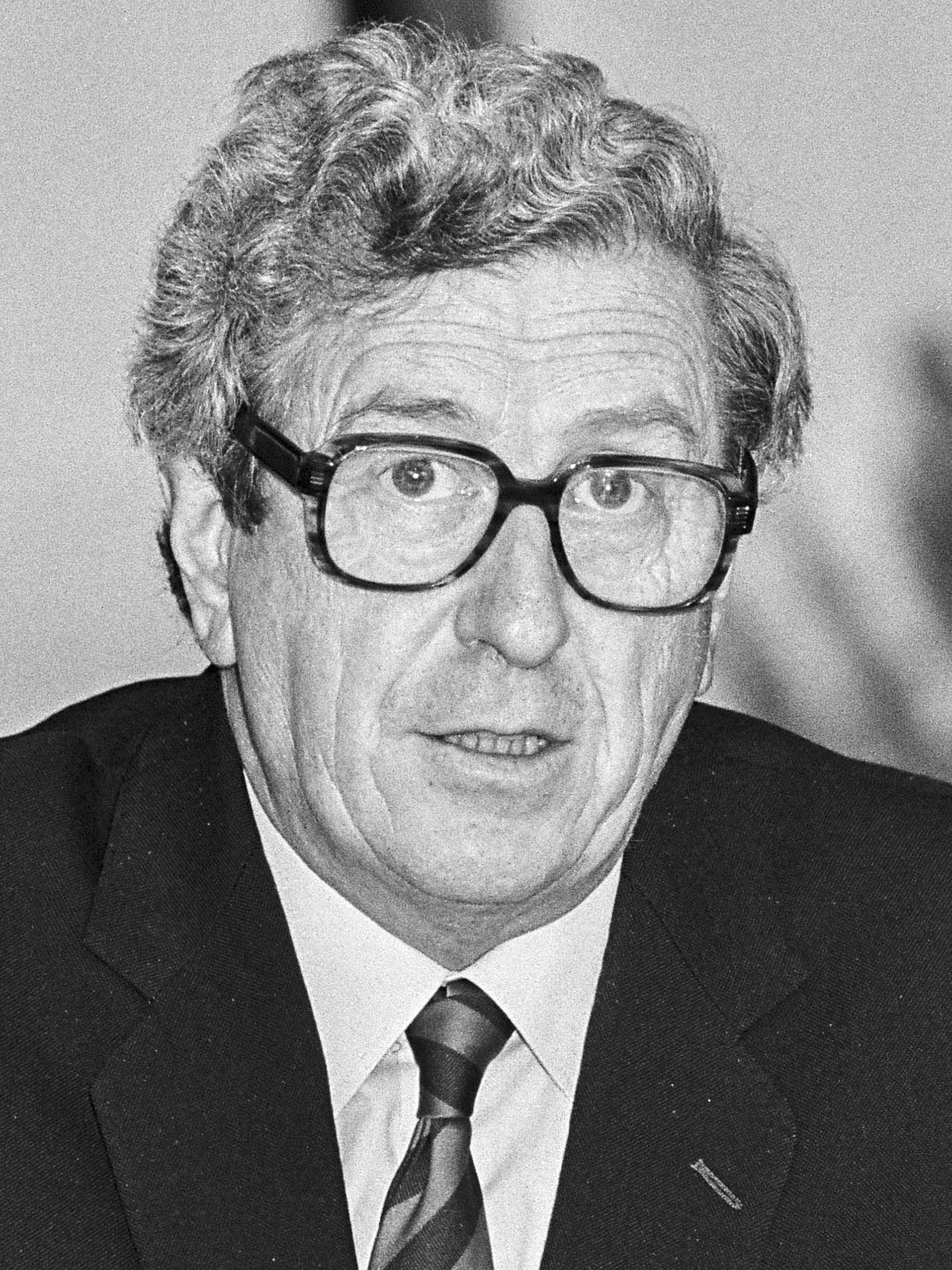
- Garret FitzGerald in 1984
- Date formed: 14 December 1982
- Date dissolved: 10 March 1987

People and organisations
- President: Patrick Hillery
- Taoiseach: Garret FitzGerald
- Tánaiste: Dick Spring (1982–1987); Peter Barry (1987)
- Total no. of members: 15
- Member parties: Fine Gael; Labour Party (Dec. 1982–Jan. 1987)
- Status in legislature: Majority Coalition
- Opposition party: Fianna Fáil
- Opposition leader: Charles Haughey

History
- Election: November 1982 general election
- Legislature terms: 24th Dáil; 17th Seanad
- Predecessor: 18th government
- Successor: 20th government

The 19th government of Ireland (14 December 1982 – 10 March 1987) was the government of Ireland formed after the November 1982 general election to the 24th Dáil. It was a coalition government of Fine Gael and the Labour Party led by Garret FitzGerald as Taoiseach and lasted for 4 years, 86 days.

== Nomination of Taoiseach ==
The 24th Dáil first met on 14 December 1982. In the debate on the nomination of Taoiseach, the Fianna Fáil leader and outgoing Taoiseach Charles Haughey, and Fine Gael leader Garret FitzGerald were both proposed. The nomination of Haughey was defeated with 77 votes in favour to 88 against, while the nomination of FitzGerald was carried with 85 in favour and 79 against. FitzGerald was then appointed as Taoiseach by president Patrick Hillery.

14 December 1982; Nomination of Garret FitzGerald (FG) as Taoiseach; Motion proposed by Kieran Crotty and seconded by Nora Owen; Absolute majority: 84/166
Vote	Parties	Votes
Yes	Fine Gael (69), Labour Party (16)	85 / 166
No	Fianna Fáil (75), Workers' Party (2), Independent Fianna Fáil (1), Independent (1)	79 / 166
Not voting	Ceann Comhairle (1), Independent (1)	2 / 166

== Government ministers ==
After his appointment as Taoiseach by the president, Garret FitzGerald proposed the members of the government and they were approved by the Dáil. They were appointed by the president on the same day.

Office	Name	Term	Party
Taoiseach	Garret FitzGerald (Note: Garret FitzGerald was acting Minister for Trade, Commerce and Tourism from 8 to 13 December 1983 following the resignation of Frank Cluskey.)	1982–1987	Fine Gael
Tánaiste	Dick Spring	1982–1987	Labour
Minister for the Environment	Dick Spring	1982–1983	Labour
Minister for Agriculture	Austin Deasy	1982–1987	Fine Gael
Minister for Defence	Patrick Cooney	1982–1986	Fine Gael
Minister for Education	Gemma Hussey	1982–1986	Fine Gael
Minister for Finance	Alan Dukes	1982–1986	Fine Gael
Minister for Fisheries and Forestry	Paddy O'Toole	1982–1986	Fine Gael
Minister for the Gaeltacht	Paddy O'Toole	1982–1987	Fine Gael
Minister for Foreign Affairs	Peter Barry	1982–1987	Fine Gael
Minister for Health	Barry Desmond	1982–1987	Labour
Minister for Social Welfare	Barry Desmond	1982–1986	Labour
Minister for Industry and Energy	John Bruton	1982–1983	Fine Gael
Minister for Justice	Michael Noonan	1982–1986	Fine Gael
Minister for Labour	Liam Kavanagh	1982–1983	Labour
Minister for Posts and Telegraphs	Jim Mitchell	1982–1984	Fine Gael
Minister for Transport	Jim Mitchell	1982–1984	Fine Gael
Minister for the Public Service	John Boland	1982–1986	Fine Gael
Minister for Trade, Commerce and Tourism	Frank Cluskey	1982–1983	Labour
=== Changes 13 December 1983 === Reshuffle on the resignation of Frank Cluskey.
Office	Name	Term	Party
Minister for Energy (Note: The Department of Industry and Energy was renamed as the Department of Energy on 17 December 1983.)	Dick Spring	1983–1987	Labour
Minister for the Environment	Liam Kavanagh	1983–1986	Labour
Minister for Industry, Trade, Commerce and Tourism (Note: The Department of Trade, Commerce and Tourism was renamed as the Department of Industry, Trade, Commerce and Tourism on 17 December 1983.)	John Bruton	1983–1986	Fine Gael
Minister for Labour	Ruairi Quinn	1983–1987	Labour
=== Changes 2 January 1984 === On the abolition of the Department of Posts and Telegraphs and the Department of Transport and the establishment of the Department of Communications.
Office	Name	Term	Party
Minister for Communications (Note: The Department of Posts and Telegraphs and the Department of Transport were abolished and replaced by the Department of Communications on 2 January 1984.)	Jim Mitchell	1984–1987	Fine Gael
=== Changes 14 February 1986 === Reshuffle.
Office	Name	Term	Party
Minister for Education	Patrick Cooney	1986–1987	Fine Gael
Minister for the Environment	John Boland	1986–1987	Fine Gael
Minister for Defence	Paddy O'Toole	1986–1987	Fine Gael
Minister for Finance	John Bruton	1986–1987	Fine Gael
Minister for Industry and Commerce (Note: The Department of Industry, Trade, Commerce and Tourism was renamed as the Department of Industry and Commerce on 19 February 1986.)	Michael Noonan	1986–1987	Fine Gael
Minister for Justice	Alan Dukes	1986–1987	Fine Gael
Minister for the Public Service	Ruairi Quinn	1986–1987	Labour
Minister for Social Welfare	Gemma Hussey	1986–1987	Fine Gael
Minister for Tourism, Fisheries and Forestry (Note: The Department of Fisheries and Forestry was renamed as the Department of Tourism, Fisheries and Forestry on 19 February 1986.)	Liam Kavanagh	1986–1987	Labour
=== Changes 20 January 1987 === On 20 January 1987, Dick Spring, Barry Desmond, Liam Kavanagh and Ruairi Quinn, the Labour Party ministers, resigned from the government. No new members joined the cabinet and their portfolios were redistributed.
Office	Name	Term	Party
Tánaiste	Peter Barry	1987	Fine Gael
Minister for Energy	Michael Noonan	1987	Fine Gael
Minister for Health	John Boland	1987	Fine Gael
Minister for Labour	Gemma Hussey	1987	Fine Gael
Minister for the Public Service	John Bruton	1987	Fine Gael
Minister for Tourism, Fisheries and Forestry	Paddy O'Toole	1987	Fine Gael

== Attorney General ==
On 14 December 1982, Peter Sutherland SC was appointed by the president as Attorney General on the nomination of the Taoiseach. He resigned as Attorney General on 12 December 1984 on his nomination as European Commissioner. On 13 December 1984, John Rogers SC was appointed by the president as Attorney General on the nomination of the Taoiseach.

== Ministers of state ==
On 14 December 1982, the Government on the nomination of the Taoiseach appointed Seán Barrett to the post of Minister of State at the Department of the Taoiseach with special responsibility as Government Chief Whip. On 16 December 1982, the Government appointed the other Ministers of State on the nomination of the Taoiseach.

Name	Department(s)	Responsibility	Party
Seán Barrett	Taoiseach; Defence	Government Chief Whip	Fine Gael
Nuala Fennell	Taoiseach	Women's Affairs and Family Law Reform	Fine Gael
Ted Nealon	Taoiseach	Arts and Culture	Fine Gael
Ruairi Quinn	Environment	Urban Affairs and Housing	Labour
Jim O'Keeffe	Foreign Affairs	Overseas Development	Fine Gael
Patrick Hegarty	Agriculture	Production	Fine Gael
Paul Connaughton Snr	Agriculture	Land Structure and Development	Fine Gael
Joseph Bermingham	Finance	Office of Public Works	Labour
Edward Collins	Industry and Energy	Energy Affairs	Fine Gael
John Donnellan	Posts and Telegraphs; Transport	Posts and Telegraphs Service	Fine Gael
Michael Moynihan	Trade, Commerce and Tourism	Tourism	Labour
George Birmingham	Labour	Youth Affairs	Fine Gael
Fergus O'Brien	Health; Social Welfare	Public Health and Social Welfare Information	Fine Gael
Donal Creed	Education	School Buildings and Sport	Fine Gael
Michael D'Arcy	Fisheries and Forestry; Gaeltacht	Fisheries and Forestry	Fine Gael
=== Changes 7 January 1983 === Nuala Fennell was appointed Minister of State at the Department of Justice with responsibility for Family Law Reform in addition to her existing post.
=== Changes 18 February 1983 === Ted Nealon was appointed Minister of State at the Department of Posts and Telegraphs with responsibility for broadcasting in addition to his existing post.
=== Changes 15 December 1983 === Reshuffle on the appointment of Ruairi Quinn to cabinet.
Name	Department(s)	Responsibility	Party
Edward Collins	Trade, Commerce and Tourism	Commercial Affairs	Fine Gael
John Donnellan	Health; Social Welfare	Public Health and Social Welfare Information	Fine Gael
George Birmingham	Education	Co-ordination of Education and Training	Fine Gael
Fergus O'Brien	Environment	Urban Affairs, Housing and Local Government Reform	Fine Gael
Séamus Pattison	Social Welfare	Social Welfare Administration	Labour
=== Changes 2 January 1984 === Ted Nealon was appointed Minister of State at the Department of Communications with responsibility for radio and television on the creation of the new department.
=== Changes 13 February 1986 === Reshuffle, including the resignation of Joseph Bermingham.
Name	Department(s)	Responsibility	Party
Fergus O'Brien	Taoiseach; Defence; Environment	Government Chief Whip; Urban Development	Fine Gael
Seán Barrett	Taoiseach; Education	Dáil Reform; Sport	Fine Gael
Jim O'Keeffe	Public Service		Fine Gael
Patrick Hegarty	Agriculture; Industry and Commerce	Food Sector	Fine Gael
George Birmingham	Foreign Affairs	European Affairs and Development Co-operation	Fine Gael
Toddy O'Sullivan	Environment	Grants Administration	Labour
Edward Collins	Industry and Commerce; Energy	Commerce and Services	Fine Gael
John Donnellan	Tourism, Fisheries and Forestry	Fisheries	Fine Gael
Michael Moynihan	Tourism, Fisheries and Forestry	Tourism	Labour
=== Changes 18 February 1986 === Following the dismissal from office of Donal Creed and Michael D'Arcy, who had refused to resign in order to facilitate the reshuffle.
Enda Kenny	Labour; Education	Youth Affairs	Fine Gael
Avril Doyle	Finance; Environment	Office of Public Works and Environmental Protection	Fine Gael
=== Changes 23 September 1986 === Following the dismissal of Edward Collins.
Name	Department(s)	Responsibility	Party
Richard Bruton	Energy; Industry and Commerce	Energy Affairs	Fine Gael
=== Changes 20 January 1987 === On 20 January 1987, Michael Moynihan, Séamus Pattison and Toddy O'Sullivan, the Labour Party ministers of state, resigned their positions. Their positions were not reassigned.

== Confidence in the government ==
After the February 1986 reshuffle, including the failure of FitzGerald to move Barry Desmond from the Department of Health and having misinformed the Dáil about the resignation of ministers of state who were subsequently sacked, Charles Haughey sought to move a motion of no confidence in the government. This was debated as a motion of confidence in the Taoiseach, proposed by Tánaiste Dick Spring. The motion of confidence was carried on 21 February 1986 by a vote of 82 to 77.

In June 1986, Joseph Bermingham had resigned from the Labour Party, leaving the coalition parties in a minority. In October 1986, moved a motion of no confidence in the government. This was debated as a motion of confidence in the Taoiseach and the government, proposed by Taoiseach Garret FitzGerald. The motion of confidence was carried on 23 October 1986 by a vote of 83 to 81. Bermingham voted with the government; Seán Treacy, who had resigned from Labour in February 1985, voted with the opposition.

== Government policy ==
The "republican crusade" flagged by Garret Fitzgerald when he was previously in government in 1981 was progressed with some changes in policy on Northern Ireland and social issues.

=== Economics ===
The government resorted to high marginal tax rates to curb the national debt, which had increased when spending commitments accrued under the 1977–81 government's expansion of the public sector became unsustainable after the 1979 energy crisis. High taxes and high unemployment brought a return to high net emigration, a long-established Irish flow which had temporarily reversed in the 1970s. An economic policy document, "Building on reality", was published in 1984.

=== Constitutional referendums ===
The Eighth Amendment to recognise the right to life of the unborn had been proposed by the previous government. It was adopted by the FitzGerald government, but not supported by Labour. An attempt to amend the wording was unsuccessful. The amendment was approved in a referendum in September 1983.

The Ninth Amendment of the Constitution of Ireland permitted legislation to allow non-Irish citizens to vote in Dáil elections.

A referendum to ease the ban on divorce was defeated in 1986.

=== Contraception ===
A bill to ease restrictions on contraception was passed in 1985. The failure of Desmond O'Malley to vote against this legislation led to his expulsion from Fianna Fáil. O'Malley later established the Progressive Democrats in December 1985.

=== Northern Ireland ===
The government's New Ireland Forum was a prelude to the Anglo-Irish Agreement signed in 1985.
