= Minister for Tourism, Culture and Sport =

Minister for Tourism, Culture and Sport may refer to:

- a former title of a minister in the Government of Ireland from 2010 to 2011, renamed the Minister for Culture, Communications and Sport in 2025
- a former department of the Scottish Government from 2003 to 2007
