= Minister for Posts and Telegraphs =

Former Irish government cabinet minister

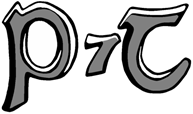
The original logo of the department, including the Tironian et symbol, is still often seen on early postboxes and other older property.

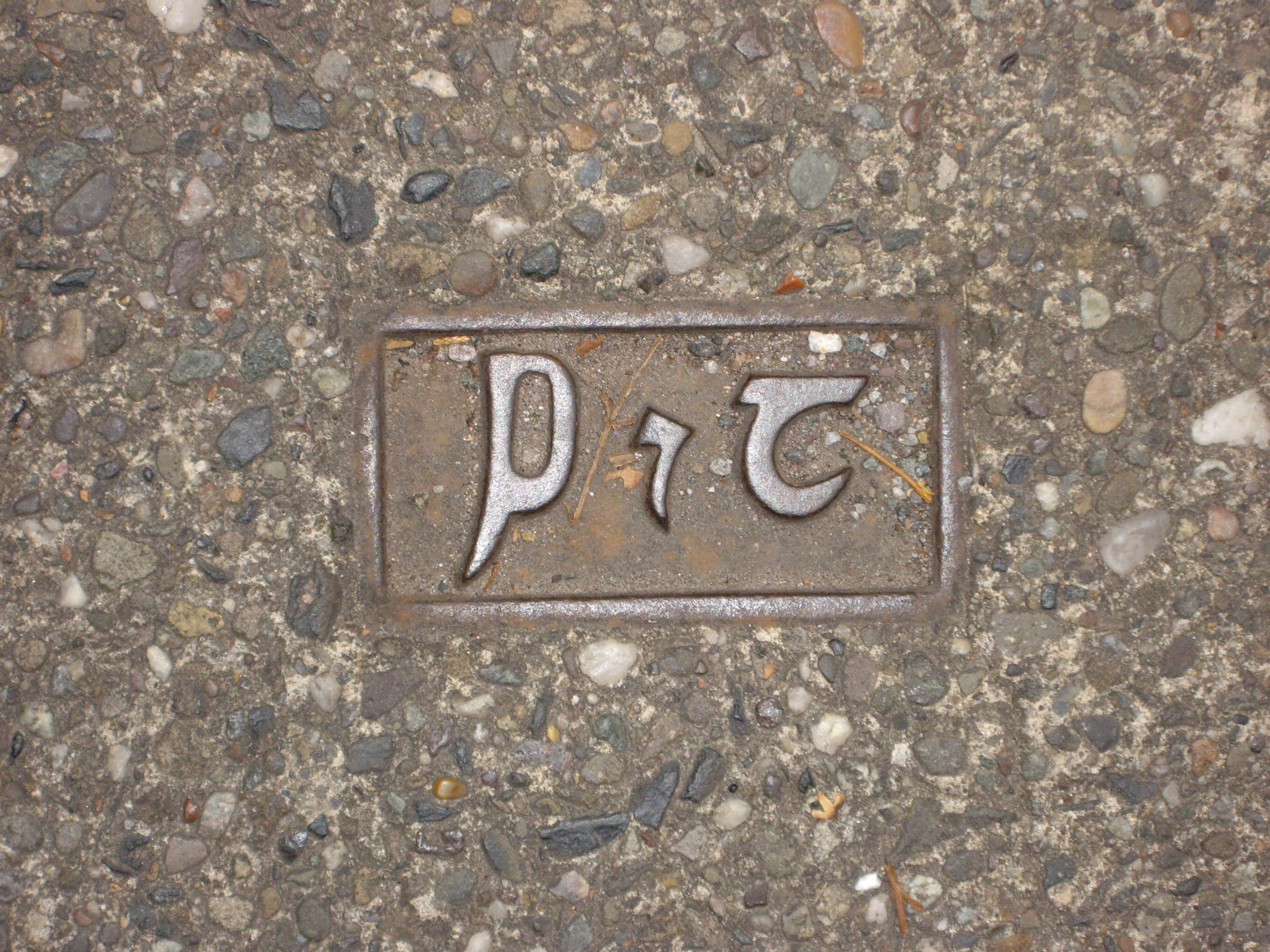
Pre-1984 manhole cover showing the P⁊T logo

The minister for posts and telegraphs (Irish: Aire Poist agus Telegrafa) was the holder of a position in the Government of Ireland (and, earlier, in the Executive Council of the Irish Free State). From 1924 until 1984 – when it was abolished – the minister headed the Department of Posts and Telegraphs (also known as the P&T in English and P⁊T in Irish, and later stylised as p+t), the government-run postal, telegraph and telephone service covering the Republic of Ireland.

== History ==
The office of Minister for Posts and Telegraphs was created by the Ministers and Secretaries Act 1924, which reorganised the Irish system of government shortly after the establishment of the Irish Free State in 1922. The minister exercised those functions which had formerly been exercised by the Postmaster General of the United Kingdom. Legislation in 1831 had amalgamated the earlier offices of Postmaster General of Great Britain and Postmasters General of Ireland, which became a jointly held role in the administration of the Lord Lieutenant of Ireland.

This later and final version of the logo of the department was most commonly associated with the orange and white postal vans.

The Ministers and Secretaries Act 1924 defined the department's role:

The Department of Posts and Telegraphs which shall comprise the administration and business generally of public services in connection with posts, telegraphs, and telephones, and all powers, duties and functions connected with the same, and shall include in particular the business, powers, duties and functions of the branches and officers of the public services specified in the Eighth Part of the Schedule to this Act, and of which Department the head shall be, and shall be styled, an t-Aire Puist agus Telegrafa or (in English) the Minister for Posts and Telegraphs.

The minister for posts and telegraphs was responsible for Ireland's postal and telecommunications services from 1924 to 1984. At its height the department was one of the largest civil service departments in Ireland. The reform of the sector and department began in 1978 with the creation of the Posts and Telegraphs Review Group. This led, following the delivery of a report in 1979, to the creation of the ad hoc Interim Board for Posts (An Bord Poist), chaired by Feargal Quinn, and the Interim Board for Telecommunications (An Bord Telecom), chaired by Michael Smurfit. These two boards continued to sit until An Post and Telecom Éireann, respectively, replaced them in 1984 as state-sponsored agencies.

The Department of Posts and Telegraphs ceased to exist in 1984, and its powers and responsibilities were transferred to the newly created Department of Communications. This was one of the largest reorganisations of the civil service in modern times, the old department having had a workforce of about 30,000 prior to dissolution. With the transfer of personnel to the new agencies, the number of civil service employees was almost halved overnight.

The minister for communications was created in 1983 to replace both the minister for posts and telegraphs and the minister for transport. In 1987, the transport functions of the department were moved to a new Department of Tourism and Transport. In 1991 the minister's functions were passed to the renamed mnister for tourism, transport and communications and the department ceased to exist, but was not formally abolished.

The functions which had initially been under the minister for communications are now under the minister for climate, energy and the environment, the minister for culture, communications and sport, and the minister for transport.

=== Alteration of name and transfer of functions ===
Name	Change
2 June 1924	Establishment of the Department of Posts and Telegraphs
2 January 1984	Establishment of the Department of Communications; Abolition of the Department of Posts and Telegraphs and the Department of Transport; Transfer of functions to the Department of Communications
31 March 1987	Transfer of Shipping to the Department of the Marine
31 March 1987	Transfer of Transport to the Department of Tourism and Transport
8 February 1991	Transfer of all remaining functions to the Department of Tourism, Transport and Communications

== List of office-holders ==
=== Postmaster General 1922–1924 ===
Name	Term of office		Party	Government(s) (Note: Before 1937: DM – Dáil Ministry; PG – Provisional Government; EC – Executive Council.)
J. J. Walsh	1 April 1922	2 June 1924	Cumann na nGaedheal	1st PG • 2nd PG • 5th DM • 1st EC • 2nd EC
=== Minister for Posts and Telegraphs 1924–1984 ===
Name	Term of office		Party	Government(s)
J. J. Walsh	2 June 1924	12 October 1927	Cumann na nGaedheal	2nd EC • 3rd EC
Ernest Blythe	12 October 1927	9 March 1932	Cumann na nGaedheal	4th EC • 5th EC
Joseph Connolly	9 March 1932	8 February 1933	Fianna Fáil	6th EC
Gerald Boland	8 February 1933	11 November 1936	Fianna Fáil	7th EC
Oscar Traynor	11 November 1936	8 September 1939	Fianna Fáil	7th EC • 8th EC • 1st • 2nd
Thomas Derrig	8 September 1939	27 September 1939	Fianna Fáil	2nd
Patrick Little	27 September 1939	18 February 1948	Fianna Fáil	2nd • 3rd • 4th
James Everett	18 February 1948	13 June 1951	National Labour Party	5th
Erskine H. Childers (1st time)	13 June 1951	2 June 1954	Fianna Fáil	6th
Michael Keyes	2 June 1954	20 March 1957	Labour	7th
Neil Blaney	20 March 1957	4 December 1957	Fianna Fáil	8th
John Ormonde	4 December 1957	23 June 1959	Fianna Fáil	8th
Michael Hilliard	23 June 1959	21 April 1965	Fianna Fáil	8th • 9th • 10th
Joseph Brennan	21 April 1965	10 November 1966	Fianna Fáil	11th
Erskine H. Childers (2nd time)	10 November 1966	2 July 1969	Fianna Fáil	12th
Patrick Lalor	2 July 1969	9 May 1970	Fianna Fáil	13th
Gerry Collins	9 May 1970	14 March 1973	Fianna Fáil	13th
Conor Cruise O'Brien	14 March 1973	5 July 1977	Labour	14th
Pádraig Faulkner	5 July 1977	11 December 1979	Fianna Fáil	15th
Albert Reynolds (Note: Also Minister for Transport)	12 December 1979	30 June 1981	Fianna Fáil	16th
Patrick Cooney	30 June 1981	9 March 1982	Fine Gael	17th
John Wilson	9 March 1982	14 December 1982	Fianna Fáil	18th
Jim Mitchell	14 December 1982	2 January 1984	Fine Gael	19th
=== Minister for Communications 1984–1991 ===
Name	Term of office		Party	Government(s)
Jim Mitchell	2 January 1984	10 March 1987	Fine Gael	19th
John Wilson	10 March 1987	31 March 1987	Fianna Fáil	20th
Ray Burke (Note: Also Minister for Justice from 12 July 1989 to 11 February 1992)	31 March 1987	6 February 1991	Fianna Fáil	20th • 21st

== List of ministers of state ==
Under the Ministers and Secretaries Act 1924, the Executive Council could appoint parliamentary secretaries to assist ministers in the Executive Council (renamed the Government in 1937). From 1978, this position was abolished and replaced by the position of minister of state who could be appointed to a government department. The minister of state did not hold cabinet rank.

=== Parliamentary Secretary to the Minister for Posts and Telegraphs 1927–1978 ===
Name	Term of office		Party	Responsibilities	Government
Michael Heffernan	11 October 1927	29 January 1932	Farmers' Party		4th EC • 5th EC
Patrick Lalor	16 November 1966	2 July 1969	Fianna Fáil		12th
Tom Fitzpatrick	5 July 1977	1 January 1978	Fianna Fáil		15th
=== Minister of State at the Department of Posts and Telegraphs 1978–1984 ===
Name	Term of office		Party	Responsibilities	Government
Tom Fitzpatrick	1 January 1978	11 December 1979	Fianna Fáil		15th
Mark Killilea Jnr	12 December 1979	30 June 1981	Fianna Fáil		16th
Paddy Harte	30 June 1981	9 March 1982	Fine Gael	Telecommunications	17th
Terry Leyden	23 March 1982	14 December 1982	Fianna Fáil	Telecommunications	18th
John Donnellan	16 December 1982	15 December 1983	Fine Gael	Posts and Telegraphs Service	19th
Ted Nealon	18 February 1983	2 January 1984	Fine Gael	Broadcasting	19th
=== Minister of State at the Department of Communications 1984–1987 ===
Name	Term of office		Party	Responsibilities	Government
Ted Nealon	2 January 1984	10 March 1987	Fine Gael	Radio and television	19th
