= Minister for Enterprise, Tourism and Employment =

Irish government cabinet minister

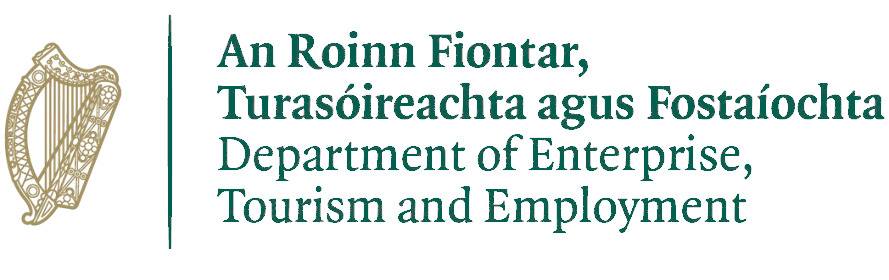

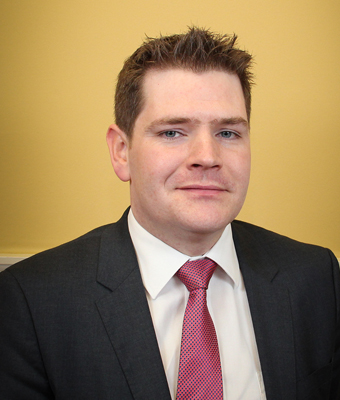
- Incumbent; Peter Burke since 9 April 2024
- Department of Enterprise, Tourism and Employment
- Type: Economy minister
- Status: Cabinet minister
- Member of: Government of Ireland; Council of the European Union; Dáil Éireann
- Reports to: Taoiseach
- Seat: Dublin, Ireland
- Nominator: Taoiseach
- Appointer: President of Ireland; (on the advice of the Taoiseach)
- Inaugural holder: Ernest Blythe as Director of Trade and Commerce
- Formation: 17 June 1919
- Salary: €210,750 (2025) (including €115,953 TD salary)
- Website: Official website

The minister for enterprise, tourism and employment (Irish: An tAire Fiontar, Turasóireachta agus Fostaíochta) is a senior minister in the Government of Ireland and leads the Department of Enterprise, Tourism and Employment.

The current minister for enterprise, tourism and employment is Peter Burke, TD.

He is assisted by two ministers of state:

- Niamh Smyth, TD – Minister of State for trade promotion, artificial intelligence and digital transformation
- Alan Dillon, TD – Minister of State for small businesses and retail

== Overview ==
The minister heads one of the most important economic departments in the Irish Government, responsible for the implementation of policy in five key areas – Enterprise, Innovation, Growth; Quality, Work and Learning; Making Markets and Regulation work better; Quality, Value and Continuous Improvement; and the European Union. A large element of the work of the Department arises from Ireland's membership of a number of international organisations, in particular the European Union and the World Trade Organization. The Department plays an active role in the development of EU and WTO policies, particularly to ensure that Ireland's interests are protected. The Department is organised into five divisions. They are:

- Innovation and Investment Division
- Enterprise and Trade Division
- Commerce, Consumer and Competition Division
- Employment Rights and Industrial Relations Division
- Corporate Services

== List of office-holders ==
Denotes acting Minister

=== Director of Trade and Commerce 1919–1921 ===
Name	Term of office		Party	Government(s) (Note: Before 1937: DM – Dáil Ministry; PG – Provisional Government; EC – Executive Council.)
Ernest Blythe	17 June 1919	26 August 1921	Sinn Féin	2nd DM
=== Secretary for Trade and Commerce 1921–1922 ===
Name	Term of office		Party	Government(s)
Ernest Blythe	26 August 1921	11 January 1922	Sinn Féin	3rd DM
=== Minister for Trade 1922 ===
Name	Term of office		Party	Government(s)
Ernest Blythe	11 January 1922	30 August 1922	Sinn Féin (Pro-Treaty)	4th DM • 1st PG
=== Minister for Industry and Commerce 1922–1977 ===
Name	Term of office		Party	Government(s)
Joseph McGrath	30 August 1922	7 March 1924	Cumann na nGaedheal	2nd PG • 5th DM • 1st EC • 2nd EC
Patrick McGilligan	4 April 1924	9 March 1932	Cumann na nGaedheal	2nd EC • 3rd EC • 4th EC • 5th EC
Seán Lemass (1st time)	9 March 1932	16 September 1939	Fianna Fáil	6th EC • 7th EC • 8th EC • 1st • 2nd
Seán MacEntee	16 September 1939	18 August 1941	Fianna Fáil	2nd
Seán Lemass (2nd time) (Note: Also Minister for Supplies from 8 September 1939 to 1 August 1945.)	18 August 1941	18 February 1948	Fianna Fáil	2nd • 3rd • 4th
Daniel Morrissey	18 February 1948	7 March 1951	Fine Gael	5th
Thomas F. O'Higgins	7 March 1951	13 June 1951	Fine Gael	5th
Seán Lemass (3rd time)	13 June 1951	2 June 1954	Fianna Fáil	6th
William Norton	2 June 1954	20 March 1957	Labour	7th
Seán Lemass (4th time)	20 March 1957	23 June 1959	Fianna Fáil	8th
Jack Lynch	23 June 1959	21 April 1965	Fianna Fáil	9th • 10th
Patrick Hillery	21 April 1965	13 July 1966	Fianna Fáil	11th
George Colley	13 July 1966	9 May 1970	Fianna Fáil	12th • 13th
Patrick Lalor	9 May 1970	14 March 1973	Fianna Fáil	13th
Justin Keating	14 March 1973	5 July 1977	Labour	14th
Desmond O'Malley (1st time)	5 July 1977	23 September 1977	Fianna Fáil	15th
=== Minister for Industry, Commerce and Energy 1977–1980 ===
Name	Term of office		Party	Government(s)
Desmond O'Malley	23 September 1977	23 January 1980	Fianna Fáil	15th • 16th
=== Minister for Industry, Commerce and Tourism 1980–1981 ===
Name	Term of office		Party	Government(s)
Desmond O'Malley	23 January 1980	30 June 1981	Fianna Fáil	16th
John Kelly	30 June 1981	21 August 1981	Fine Gael	17th
=== Minister for Trade, Commerce and Tourism 1981–1983 ===
Name	Term of office		Party	Government(s)
John Kelly	21 August 1981	9 March 1982	Fine Gael	17th
Desmond O'Malley (2nd time)	9 March 1982	6 October 1982	Fianna Fáil	18th
Paddy Power	7 October 1982	27 October 1982	Fianna Fáil	18th
Pádraig Flynn (1st time)	27 October 1982	14 December 1982	Fianna Fáil	18th
Frank Cluskey	14 December 1982	8 December 1983	Labour	19th
Garret FitzGerald (acting)	8 December 1983	13 December 1983	Fine Gael	19th
John Bruton	13 December 1983	17 December 1983	Fine Gael	19th
=== Minister for Industry, Trade, Commerce and Tourism 1983–1986 ===
Name	Term of office		Party	Government(s)
John Bruton	17 December 1983	14 February 1986	Fine Gael	19th
Michael Noonan	14 February 1986	19 February 1986	Fine Gael	19th
=== Minister for Industry and Commerce 1986–1993 ===
Name	Term of office		Party	Government(s)
Michael Noonan	19 February 1986	10 March 1987	Fine Gael	19th
Albert Reynolds	10 March 1987	24 November 1988	Fianna Fáil	20th
Ray Burke	24 November 1988	12 July 1989	Fianna Fáil	20th
Desmond O'Malley (3rd time)	12 July 1989	4 November 1992	Progressive Democrats	21st • 22nd
Pádraig Flynn (2nd time)	5 November 1992	4 January 1993	Fianna Fáil	22nd
Bertie Ahern	4 January 1993	12 January 1993	Fianna Fáil	22nd
Ruairi Quinn	12 January 1993	21 January 1993	Labour	23rd
=== Minister for Enterprise and Employment 1993–1997 ===
Name	Term of office		Party	Government(s)
Ruairi Quinn	21 January 1993	17 November 1994	Labour	23rd
Charlie McCreevy	18 November 1994	15 December 1994	Fianna Fáil	23rd
Richard Bruton (1st time)	15 December 1994	26 June 1997	Fine Gael	24th
Mary Harney	26 June 1997	12 July 1997	Progressive Democrats	25th
=== Minister for Enterprise, Trade and Employment 1997–2010 ===
Name	Term of office		Party	Government(s)
Mary Harney	12 July 1997	29 September 2004	Progressive Democrats	25th • 26th
Micheál Martin	29 September 2004	7 May 2008	Fianna Fáil	26th • 27th
Mary Coughlan	7 May 2008	23 March 2010	Fianna Fáil	28th
Batt O'Keeffe	23 March 2010	2 May 2010	Fianna Fáil	28th
=== Minister for Enterprise, Trade and Innovation 2010–2011 ===
Name	Term of office		Party	Government(s)
Batt O'Keeffe	2 May 2010	20 January 2011	Fianna Fáil	28th
Mary Hanafin	20 January 2011	9 March 2011	Fianna Fáil	28th
Richard Bruton (2nd time)	9 March 2011	2 June 2011	Fine Gael	29th
=== Minister for Jobs, Enterprise and Innovation 2011–2017 ===
Name	Term of office		Party	Government(s)
Richard Bruton (2nd time)	2 June 2011	6 May 2016	Fine Gael	29th
Mary Mitchell O'Connor	6 May 2016	14 June 2017	Fine Gael	30th
Frances Fitzgerald	14 June 2017	2 September 2017	Fine Gael	31st
=== Minister for Business, Enterprise and Innovation 2017–2020 ===
Name	Term of office		Party	Government(s)
Frances Fitzgerald	2 September 2017	28 November 2017	Fine Gael	31st
Leo Varadkar (acting)	28 November 2017	30 November 2017	Fine Gael	31st
Heather Humphreys	30 November 2017	27 June 2020	Fine Gael	31st
=== Minister for Enterprise, Trade and Employment 2020–2025 ===
Name	Term of office		Party	Government(s)
Leo Varadkar	27 June 2020	17 December 2022	Fine Gael	32nd
Simon Coveney	17 December 2022	9 April 2024	Fine Gael	33rd
Peter Burke	9 April 2024	23 January 2025	Fine Gael	34th
=== Minister for Enterprise, Tourism and Employment 2025–present ===
Name	Term of office		Party	Government(s)
Peter Burke	23 January 2025	Incumbent	Fine Gael	35th
