= Dáil vote for Taoiseach =

Irish constitutional procedure for installing the head of government

The Taoiseach is the head of the Government of Ireland. Under Article 13 of the Constitution of Ireland, the Taoiseach is appointed by the President of Ireland on the nomination of Dáil Éireann, the lower house of the Oireachtas. The Taoiseach must be a member of Dáil Éireann.

After a general election or the resignation or death of a Taoiseach, members of the Dáil are proposed and seconded for the nomination of the Dáil to the position of Taoiseach. They are voted on in the order in which they are proposed. The candidate reaching a majority of votes cast wins the nomination, and is formally appointed as Taoiseach by the President in Áras an Uachtaráin. Before 2016, all successful candidates obtained the votes of 50% or more of the house, but following the 2016 election, Enda Kenny was elected with the votes of just over one-third of TDs after Fianna Fáil abstained as part of a confidence and supply arrangement. Since 2016, it has been possible to formally register an abstention in Dáil votes. The Ceann Comhairle casts a vote only in the case of a tie.

The Constitution of Ireland came into operation on 29 December 1937. From 6 December 1922 to 29 December 1937, during the period of the Irish Free State, the head of government was the President of the Executive Council, who was nominated by Dáil Éireann, and appointed by the Governor-General. The Governor-General was abolished in 1936. After the 1937 general election, before the coming into operation of the Constitution of Ireland, the President of the Executive Council took office immediately on the election by the Dáil.

Prior to 6 December 1922, during the period of the Irish Republic, the head of government was the President of Dáil Éireann who was elected by Dáil Éireann.

A breakdown of votes is on the pages of governments formed, while support for unsuccessful candidates is noted below.

| Dáil | Date | Following | Candidate | Party | Yes | No | Abstain | Government | Notes |
|---|---|---|---|---|---|---|---|---|---|
| 1st | 21 January 1919 | 1918 election | Cathal Brugha | Sinn Féin | Unopposed | | | 1st Ministry | Temporary government while many members of Sinn Féin were in prison |
| 1st | 1 April 1919 | Resignation of Brugha | Éamon de Valera | Sinn Féin | Unopposed | | | 2nd Ministry | |
| 2nd | 26 August 1921 | 1921 election | Éamon de Valera | Sinn Féin | Unopposed | | | 3rd Ministry | |
| 2nd | 9 January 1922 | Resignation of de Valera | Éamon de Valera | Sinn Féin (Anti-Treaty) | 58 / 125 | 60 / 125 | | | Total figures are the Sinn Féin members of the Second Dáil after the 1921 election |
| 2nd | 10 January 1922 | Resignation of de Valera | Arthur Griffith | Sinn Féin (Pro-Treaty) | No division | | | 4th Ministry | Anti-Treaty members left the Dáil before the vote was called |
| 3rd | 9 September 1922 | 1922 election | W. T. Cosgrave | Sinn Féin (Pro-Treaty) | No division | | | 5th Ministry | Labour Party and other TDs in opposition but did not call a vote |
| 3rd | 6 December 1922 | Establishment of the Irish Free State | W. T. Cosgrave | Sinn Féin (Pro-Treaty) | No division | | | 1st Executive Council | Labour Party and other TDs in opposition but did not call a vote |
| 4th | 19 September 1923 | 1923 election | W. T. Cosgrave | Cumann na nGaedheal | No division | | | 2nd Executive Council | Labour Party and other TDs in opposition but did not call a vote |
| 5th | 23 June 1927 | June 1927 election | W. T. Cosgrave | Cumann na nGaedheal | 68 / 153 | 22 / 153 | | 3rd Executive Council | Fianna Fáil abstained from the Dáil until 12 August. |
| 6th | 11 October 1927 | September 1927 election | W. T. Cosgrave | Cumann na nGaedheal | 76 / 153 | 70 / 153 | | 4th Executive Council | |
| 6th | 2 April 1930 | Resignation of Cosgrave | Éamon de Valera | Fianna Fáil | 54 / 153 | 93 / 153 | | | |
| 6th | 2 April 1930 | Resignation of Cosgrave | Thomas J. O'Connell | Labour | 13 / 153 | 78 / 153 | | | |
| 6th | 2 April 1930 | Resignation of Cosgrave | W. T. Cosgrave | Cumann na nGaedheal | 80 / 153 | 65 / 153 | | 5th Executive Council | |
| 7th | 9 March 1932 | 1932 election | Éamon de Valera | Fianna Fáil | 81 / 153 | 68 / 153 | | 6th Executive Council | |
| 8th | 8 February 1933 | 1933 election | Éamon de Valera | Fianna Fáil | 82 / 153 | 54 / 153 | | 7th Executive Council | |
| 9th | 21 July 1937 | 1937 election | Éamon de Valera | Fianna Fáil | 82 / 138 | 52 / 138 | | 8th Executive Council | Became the 1st Government of Ireland on 29 December 1937 |
| 10th | 30 June 1938 | 1938 election | Éamon de Valera | Fianna Fáil | 75 / 138 | 45 / 138 | | 2nd Government | |
| 11th | 1 July 1943 | 1943 election | Éamon de Valera | Fianna Fáil | 67 / 138 | 37 / 138 | | 3rd Government | |
| 11th | 1 July 1943 | 1943 election | W. T. Cosgrave | Fine Gael | | | | | |
| 12th | 9 June 1944 | 1944 election | Éamon de Valera | Fianna Fáil | 81 / 138 | 37 / 138 | | 4th Government | |
| 13th | 18 February 1948 | 1948 election | Éamon de Valera | Fianna Fáil | 70 / 147 | 75 / 147 | | | |
| 13th | 18 February 1948 | 1948 election | John A. Costello | Fine Gael | 75 / 147 | 68 / 147 | | 5th Government | |
| 14th | 13 June 1951 | 1951 election | John A. Costello | Fine Gael | 72 / 147 | 74 / 147 | | | Support of parties of the outgoing government |
| 14th | 13 June 1951 | 1951 election | Éamon de Valera | Fianna Fáil | 74 / 147 | 69 / 147 | | 6th Government | |
| 15th | 2 June 1954 | 1954 election | Éamon de Valera | Fianna Fáil | 66 / 147 | 78 / 147 | | | |
| 15th | 2 June 1954 | 1954 election | John A. Costello | Fine Gael | 79 / 147 | 66 / 147 | | 7th Government | |
| 16th | 20 March 1957 | 1957 election | Éamon de Valera | Fianna Fáil | 78 / 147 | 53 / 147 | | 8th Government | |
| 16th | 23 June 1959 | Resignation of de Valera | Seán Lemass | Fianna Fáil | 75 / 147 | 51 / 147 | | 9th Government | |
| 17th | 11 October 1961 | 1961 election | Seán Lemass | Fianna Fáil | 72 / 144 | 68 / 144 | | 10th Government | |
| 17th | 11 October 1961 | 1961 election | James Dillon | Fine Gael | | | | | |
| 17th | 11 October 1961 | 1961 election | Brendan Corish | Labour | | | | | |
| 18th | 21 April 1965 | 1965 election | Seán Lemass | Fianna Fáil | 72 / 144 | 67 / 144 | | 11th Government | |
| 18th | 21 April 1965 | 1965 election | James Dillon | Fine Gael | | | | | |
| 18th | 21 April 1965 | 1965 election | Brendan Corish | Labour | | | | | |
| 18th | 10 November 1966 | Resignation of Lemass | Jack Lynch | Fianna Fáil | 71 / 144 | 64 / 144 | | 12th Government | |
| 18th | 10 November 1966 | Resignation of Lemass | Liam Cosgrave | Fine Gael | | | | | |
| 18th | 10 November 1966 | Resignation of Lemass | Brendan Corish | Labour | | | | | |
| 19th | 2 July 1969 | 1969 election | Jack Lynch | Fianna Fáil | 74 / 144 | 66 / 144 | | 13th Government | |
| 19th | 2 July 1969 | 1969 election | Liam Cosgrave | Fine Gael | | | | | |
| 19th | 2 July 1969 | 1969 election | Brendan Corish | Labour | | | | | |
| 20th | 14 March 1973 | 1973 election | Jack Lynch | Fianna Fáil | 69 / 144 | 73 / 144 | | | |
| 20th | 14 March 1973 | 1973 election | Liam Cosgrave | Fine Gael | 72 / 144 | 70 / 144 | | 14th Government | |
| 21st | 5 July 1977 | 1977 election | Jack Lynch | Fianna Fáil | 82 / 148 | 61 / 148 | | 15th Government | |
| 21st | 11 December 1979 | Resignation of Lynch | Charles Haughey | Fianna Fáil | 82 / 148 | 62 / 148 | | 16th Government | |
| 22nd | 30 June 1981 | 1981 election | Charles Haughey | Fianna Fáil | 79 / 166 | 82 / 166 | | | |
| 22nd | 30 June 1981 | 1981 election | Garret FitzGerald | Fine Gael | 81 / 166 | 78 / 166 | | 17th Government | |
| 23rd | 9 March 1982 | Feb. 1982 election | Charles Haughey | Fianna Fáil | 86 / 166 | 79 / 166 | | 18th Government | |
| 23rd | 9 March 1982 | Feb. 1982 election | Garret FitzGerald | Fine Gael | | | | | |
| 24th | 14 December 1982 | Nov. 1982 election | Charles Haughey | Fianna Fáil | 77 / 166 | 88 / 166 | | | |
| 24th | 14 December 1982 | Nov. 1982 election | Garret FitzGerald | Fine Gael | 85 / 166 | 79 / 166 | | 19th Government | |
| 25th | 10 March 1987 | 1987 election | Garret FitzGerald | Fine Gael | 51 / 166 | 114 / 166 | | | |
| 25th | 10 March 1987 | 1987 election | Charles Haughey | Fianna Fáil | 82 / 166 | 82 / 166 | | 20th Government | Ceann Comhairle Seán Treacy exercised his casting vote in favour of the nomination of Haughey |
| 25th | 10 March 1987 | 1987 election | Desmond O'Malley | Progressive Democrats | | | | | |
| 26th | 29 June 1989 | 1989 election | Charles Haughey | Fianna Fáil | 78 / 166 | 86 / 166 | | | Haughey resigned as Taoiseach but continued to carry out his duties |
| 26th | 29 June 1989 | 1989 election | Alan Dukes | Fine Gael | 61 / 166 | 103 / 166 | | | Support of the Progressive Democrats |
| 26th | 29 June 1989 | 1989 election | Dick Spring | Labour | 24 / 166 | 138 / 166 | | | Support of the Workers' Party, Democratic Socialist Party and Tony Gregory |
| 26th | 12 July 1989 | 1989 election | Charles Haughey | Fianna Fáil | 84 / 166 | 79 / 166 | | 21st Government | |
| 26th | 12 July 1989 | 1989 election | Alan Dukes | Fine Gael | | | | | |
| 26th | 12 July 1989 | 1989 election | Dick Spring | Labour | | | | | |
| 26th | 11 February 1992 | Resignation of Haughey | Albert Reynolds | Fianna Fáil | 84 / 166 | 78 / 166 | | 22nd Government | |
| 26th | 11 February 1992 | Resignation of Haughey | John Bruton | Fine Gael | | | | | |
| 27th | 14 December 1992 | 1992 election | Albert Reynolds | Fianna Fáil | 68 / 166 | 94 / 166 | | | Reynolds resigned as Taoiseach but continued to carry out his duties |
| 27th | 14 December 1992 | 1992 election | John Bruton | Fine Gael | 55 / 166 | 107 / 166 | | | Support of the Progressive Democrats |
| 27th | 14 December 1992 | 1992 election | Dick Spring | Labour | 33 / 166 | 122 / 166 | | | Support of Democratic Left, Green Party and Tony Gregory |
| 27th | 12 January 1993 | 1992 election | Albert Reynolds | Fianna Fáil | 102 / 166 | 60 / 166 | | 23rd Government | |
| 27th | 12 January 1993 | 1992 election | John Bruton | Fine Gael | | | | | |
| 27th | 15 December 1994 | Resignation of Reynolds | Bertie Ahern | Fianna Fáil | 67 / 166 | 94 / 166 | | | |
| 27th | 15 December 1994 | Resignation of Reynolds | John Bruton | Fine Gael | 85 / 166 | 74 / 166 | | 24th Government | |
| 28th | 26 June 1997 | 1997 election | John Bruton | Fine Gael | 75 / 166 | 87 / 166 | | | Support of the parties of the outgoing government |
| 28th | 26 June 1997 | 1997 election | Bertie Ahern | Fianna Fáil | 85 / 166 | 78 / 166 | | | |
| 29th | 6 June 2002 | 2002 election | Bertie Ahern | Fianna Fáil | 93 / 166 | 68 / 166 | | 26th Government | |
| 29th | 6 June 2002 | 2002 election | Enda Kenny | Fine Gael | | | | | |
| 29th | 6 June 2002 | 2002 election | Ruairi Quinn | Labour | | | | | |
| 29th | 6 June 2002 | 2002 election | Trevor Sargent | Green | | | | | |
| 30th | 14 June 2007 | 2007 election | Bertie Ahern | Fianna Fáil | 89 / 166 | 76 / 166 | | 27th Government | |
| 30th | 14 June 2007 | 2007 election | Enda Kenny | Fine Gael | | | | | Support of Labour Party |
| 30th | 7 May 2008 | Resignation of Ahern | Brian Cowen | Fianna Fáil | 88 / 166 | 76 / 166 | | 28th Government | |
| 30th | 7 May 2008 | Resignation of Ahern | Enda Kenny | Fine Gael | | | | | |
| 30th | 7 May 2008 | Resignation of Ahern | Eamon Gilmore | Labour | | | | | |
| 31st | 9 March 2011 | 2011 election | Enda Kenny | Fine Gael | 117 / 158 | 27 / 158 | | 29th Government | |
| 32nd | 10 March 2016 | 2016 election | Enda Kenny | Fine Gael | 57 / 158 | 94 / 158 | | | Support of Labour Party. Kenny resigned as Taoiseach but continued to carry out his duties |
| 32nd | 10 March 2016 | 2016 election | Micheál Martin | Fianna Fáil | 43 / 158 | 108 / 158 | | | |
| 32nd | 10 March 2016 | 2016 election | Gerry Adams | Sinn Féin | 24 / 158 | 116 / 158 | | | |
| 32nd | 10 March 2016 | 2016 election | Richard Boyd Barrett | AAA–PBP | 9 / 158 | 111 / 158 | | | |
| 32nd | 6 April 2016 | 2016 election | Enda Kenny | Fine Gael | 51 / 158 | 81 / 158 | | | |
| 32nd | 6 April 2016 | 2016 election | Micheál Martin | Fianna Fáil | 43 / 158 | 95 / 158 | | | |
| 32nd | 6 April 2016 | 2016 election | Ruth Coppinger | AAA–PBP | 10 / 158 | 108 / 158 | | | |
| 32nd | 14 April 2016 | 2016 election | Enda Kenny | Fine Gael | 52 / 158 | 77 / 158 | | | |
| 32nd | 14 April 2016 | 2016 election | Micheál Martin | Fianna Fáil | 43 / 158 | 91 / 158 | | | |
| 32nd | 6 May 2016 | 2016 election | Enda Kenny | Fine Gael | 59 / 158 | 49 / 158 | | 30th Government | Fianna Fáil abstained as part of a confidence and supply arrangement |
| 32nd | 14 June 2017 | Resignation of Kenny | Leo Varadkar | Fine Gael | 57 / 158 | 50 / 158 | 45 / 158 | 31st Government | |
| 33rd | 20 February 2020 | 2020 election | Leo Varadkar | Fine Gael | 36 / 160 | 107 / 160 | 17 / 160 | | Varadkar resigned as Taoiseach but continued to carry out his duties |
| 33rd | 20 February 2020 | 2020 election | Micheál Martin | Fianna Fáil | 41 / 160 | 97 / 160 | 19 / 160 | | |
| 33rd | 20 February 2020 | 2020 election | Mary Lou McDonald | Sinn Féin | 45 / 160 | 84 / 160 | 29 / 160 | | Support of Solidarity–People Before Profit and Independents 4 Change |
| 33rd | 20 February 2020 | 2020 election | Eamon Ryan | Green | 12 / 160 | 115 / 160 | 28 / 160 | | |
| 33rd | 27 June 2020 | 2020 election | Micheál Martin | Fianna Fáil | 93 / 160 | 63 / 160 | 3 / 160 | 32nd Government | |
| 33rd | 27 June 2020 | 2020 election | Mary Lou McDonald | Sinn Féin | | | | | |
| 33rd | 17 December 2022 | Rotation of Taoiseach under Programme for Government | Leo Varadkar | Fine Gael | 87 / 160 | 62 / 160 | 1 / 160 | 33rd Government | |
| 33rd | 9 April 2024 | Resignation of Varadkar | Simon Harris | Fine Gael | 88 / 160 | 69 / 160 | 0 / 160 | 34th Government | |
| 33rd | 9 April 2024 | Resignation of Varadkar | Michael Healy-Rae | Independent | | | | | |
| 34th | 18 December 2024 | 2024 election | Mary Lou McDonald | Sinn Féin | 44 / 174 | 110 / 174 | 14 / 174 | | |
| 34th | 23 January 2025 | 2024 election | Micheál Martin | Fianna Fáil | 95 / 174 | 76 / 174 | 0 / 174 | 35th Government | |
| 34th | 23 January 2025 | 2024 election | Mary Lou McDonald | Sinn Féin | | | | | |
