= Minister of State at the Department of Agriculture, Food and the Marine =

List of Irish Ministers of State

A minister of state at the Department of Agriculture, Food and the Marine is a junior ministerial post in the Department of Agriculture, Food and the Marine of the Government of Ireland and assists the minister for agriculture, food and the marine. A minister of state does not hold cabinet rank.

There are three ministers of state:

- Noel Grealish, TD – Minister of State with responsibility for food promotion, new markets, research and development. Grealish is also a super junior minister, which is a minister of state in attendance at cabinet, but without a vote.
- Timmy Dooley, TD – Minister of State with responsibility for the marine.
- Niall Collins, TD – Minister of State with responsibility for forestry, farm safety and horticulture.

== List of parliamentary secretaries ==
Name	Term of office		Party	Government
Paddy Smith	1 January 1947	21 January 1947	Fianna Fáil	4th
Gerald Bartley	19 June 1951	2 June 1954	Fianna Fáil	6th
Oliver J. Flanagan	3 June 1954	20 March 1957	Fine Gael	7th
Patrick Lalor	21 April 1965	10 November 1966	Fianna Fáil	11th
Don Davern	16 November 1966	2 November 1968	Fianna Fáil	12th
Jerry Cronin	2 July 1969	9 May 1970	Fianna Fáil	13th
Jackie Fahey	9 May 1970	14 March 1973	Fianna Fáil	13th
Michael Pat Murphy	14 March 1973	9 February 1977	Labour	14th
Thomas Hussey	5 July 1977	1 January 1978	Fianna Fáil	15th

== List of ministers of state ==
=== Department of Agriculture 1978–1987 ===
Name	Term of office		Party	Responsibilities	Government
Thomas Hussey	1 January 1978	11 December 1979	Fianna Fáil		15th
Thomas Hussey	12 December 1979	17 December 1980	Fianna Fáil		16th
Lorcan Allen	12 December 1979	30 June 1981	Fianna Fáil		16th
Michael Smith	17 December 1980	30 June 1981	Fianna Fáil		16th
Michael D'Arcy	30 June 1981	9 March 1982	Fine Gael	Production and Marketing	17th
Ted Nealon	30 June 1981	9 March 1982	Fine Gael	Western Development	17th
Lorcan Allen	23 March 1982	14 December 1982	Fianna Fáil	Land Commission, Production and Marketing	18th
Bernard Cowen	23 March 1982	14 December 1982	Fianna Fáil	Disadvantaged Areas	18th
Patrick Hegarty	16 December 1982	10 March 1987	Fine Gael	Production	19th
Paul Connaughton Snr	16 December 1982	10 March 1987	Fine Gael	Land Structure and Development	19th
=== Department of Agriculture and Food 1987–1993 ===
Name	Term of office		Party	Responsibilities	Government
Joe Walsh	12 March 1987	12 July 1989	Fianna Fáil	Food Industry	20th
Joe Walsh	19 July 1989	11 February 1992	Fianna Fáil	Food Industry	21st
Séamus Kirk	12 March 1987	12 July 1989	Fianna Fáil	Horticulture	20th
Séamus Kirk	19 July 1989	11 February 1992	Fianna Fáil	Horticulture	21st
John Browne	13 February 1992	12 January 1993	Fianna Fáil	Food industry	22nd
Liam Hyland	13 February 1992	12 January 1993	Fianna Fáil	Horticulture	22nd
=== Department of Agriculture, Food and Forestry 1993–1997 ===
Name	Term of office		Party	Responsibilities	Government
Liam Hyland	14 January 1993	15 June 1994	Fianna Fáil	Forestry and Rural Development	23rd
Brian O'Shea	14 January 1993	17 November 1994	Labour	Food and Horticulture	23rd
Jimmy Deenihan	20 December 1994	26 June 1997	Fine Gael		24th
=== Department of Agriculture and Food 1997–1999 ===
Name	Term of office		Party	Responsibilities	Government
Noel Davern	8 July 1997	27 September 1999	Fianna Fáil	Livestock breeding and horticulture	25th
Ned O'Keeffe	8 July 1997	27 September 1999	Fianna Fáil	Food	25th
=== Department of Agriculture, Food and Rural Development 1999–2002 ===
Name	Term of office		Party	Responsibilities	Government
Noel Davern	27 September 1999	6 June 2002	Fianna Fáil	Livestock breeding and horticulture	25th
Ned O'Keeffe	27 September 1999	17 February 2001	Fianna Fáil	Food	25th
Éamon Ó Cuív	19 February 2001	6 June 2002	Fianna Fáil	Rural development and the Western Development Commission	25th
=== Department of Agriculture and Food 2002–2007 ===
Name	Term of office		Party	Responsibilities	Government
Noel Treacy	19 June 2007	29 September 2004	Fianna Fáil	Food and horticulture	26th
Liam Aylward	19 June 2007	29 September 2004	Fianna Fáil	Animal Health and Welfare; and Customer Service	26th
John Browne	29 September 2004	14 February 2006	Fianna Fáil	Forestry	26th
Brendan Smith	29 September 2004	14 June 2007	Fianna Fáil	Food and Horticulture	26th
Mary Wallace	14 February 2006	14 June 2007	Fianna Fáil	Forestry	26th
=== Department of Agriculture, Fisheries and Food 2007–2011 ===
Name	Term of office		Party	Responsibilities	Government
John Browne	20 June 2007	7 May 2008	Fianna Fáil	Fisheries	27th
Mary Wallace	20 June 2007	7 May 2008	Fianna Fáil	Forestry	27th
Trevor Sargent	20 June 2007	23 February 2010	Green	Food and Horticulture	27th • 28th
Tony Killeen	13 May 2008	23 March 2010	Fianna Fáil	Fisheries and Forestry	28th
Ciarán Cuffe	23 March 2010	23 January 2011	Green	Horticulture	28th
Seán Connick	23 March 2010	9 March 2011	Fianna Fáil	Fisheries and Forestry	28th
=== Department of Agriculture, Food and the Marine 2011–present ===
Name	Term of office		Party	Responsibilities	Government
Shane McEntee	10 March 2011	21 December 2012	Fine Gael	Food, Horticulture and Food Safety	29th
Tom Hayes	5 June 2013	6 May 2016	Fine Gael	Food, Horticulture and Food Safety	29th
Ann Phelan	15 July 2014	6 May 2016	Labour	Rural Economic Development	29th
Andrew Doyle	19 May 2016	14 June 2017	Fine Gael	Food, Forestry and Horticulture	30th
Andrew Doyle	20 June 2017	27 June 2020	Fine Gael	Food, Forestry and Horticulture	31st
Pippa Hackett	27 June 2020	23 January 2025	Green	Land use and biodiversity	32nd • 33rd • 34th
Martin Heydon	1 July 2020	23 January 2025	Fine Gael	Research and development, farm safety and new market development	32nd • 33rd • 34th
Noel Grealish	23 January 2025	Incumbent	Independent	Food promotion, new markets, research and development	35th
Michael Healy-Rae	29 January 2025	14 April 2026	Independent	Forestry, farm safety and horticulture	35th
Timmy Dooley	23 February 2025	Incumbent	Fianna Fáil	Marine	35th
Niall Collins	28 May 2026	Incumbent	Fianna Fáil	Forestry, farm safety and horticulture	35th
