= Richard Bruton =

Irish politician (born 1953)

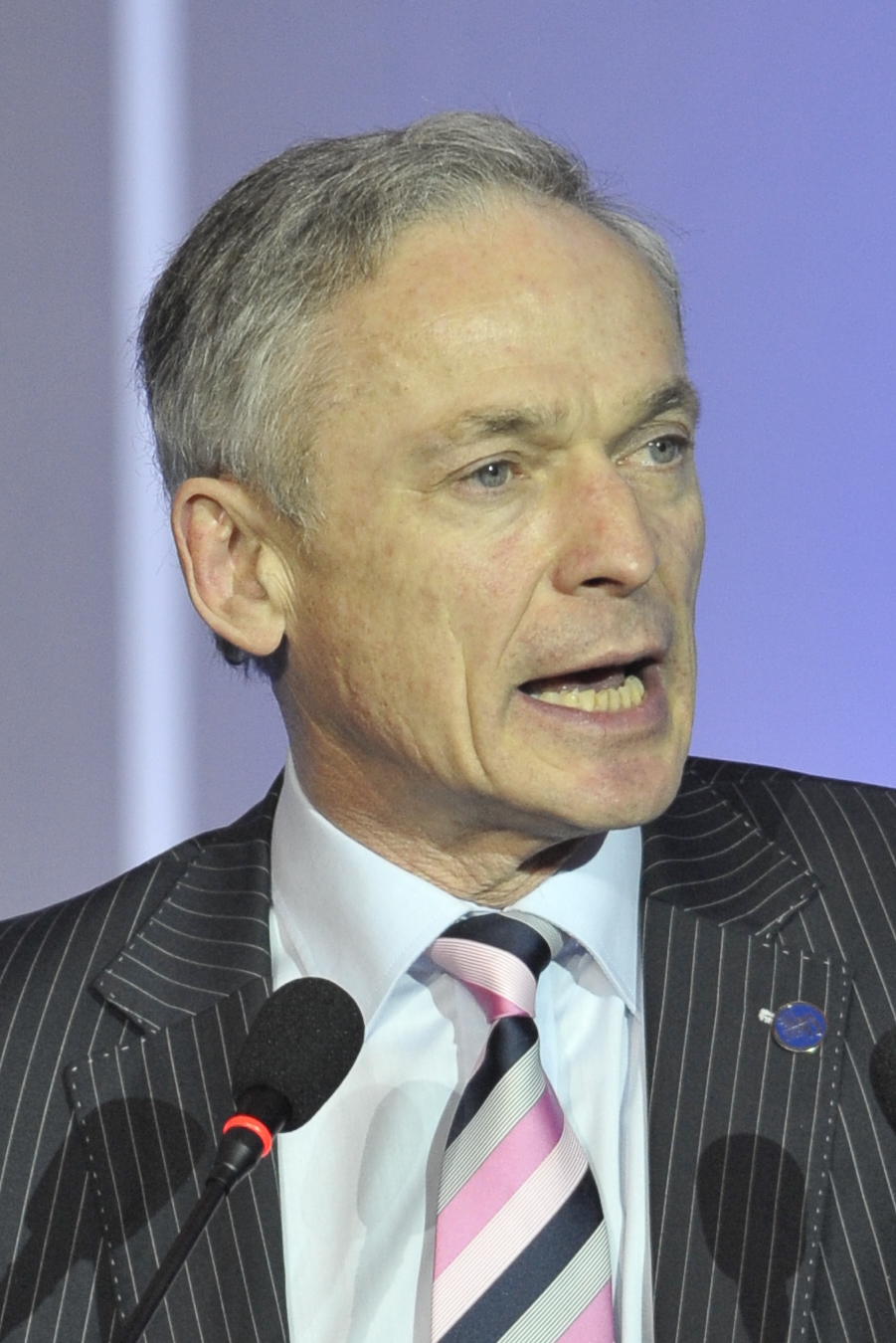
- Bruton in 2013

Teachta Dála
- In office February 2016 – November 2024
- Constituency: Dublin Bay North
- In office February 1982 – February 2016
- Constituency: Dublin North-Central

Chair of the Fine Gael parliamentary party
- In office 23 July 2020 – September 2023
- Leader: Leo Varadkar
- Preceded by: Martin Heydon
- Succeeded by: Alan Dillon

Minister for Communications, Climate Action and Environment
- In office 11 October 2018 – 27 June 2020
- Taoiseach: Leo Varadkar
- Preceded by: Denis Naughten
- Succeeded by: Eamon Ryan

Minister for Education and Skills
- In office 6 May 2016 – 16 October 2018
- Taoiseach: Enda Kenny; Leo Varadkar
- Preceded by: Jan O'Sullivan
- Succeeded by: Joe McHugh

Minister for Jobs, Enterprise and Innovation
- In office 9 March 2011 – 6 May 2016
- Taoiseach: Enda Kenny
- Preceded by: Mary Hanafin
- Succeeded by: Mary Mitchell O'Connor

Deputy leader of Fine Gael
- In office 12 June 2002 – 14 June 2010
- Leader: Enda Kenny
- Preceded by: Jim Mitchell
- Succeeded by: James Reilly

Minister for Enterprise and Employment
- In office 15 December 1994 – 26 June 1997
- Taoiseach: John Bruton
- Preceded by: Charlie McCreevy
- Succeeded by: Mary Harney

Minister of State
- 1986–1987: Energy

Senator
- In office 8 October 1981 – 18 February 1982
- Constituency: Agricultural Panel

Personal details
- Born: 15 March 1953 (age 73) Dublin, Ireland
- Party: Fine Gael
- Spouse: Susan Meehan (m. 1988)
- Children: 4
- Relatives: John Bruton (brother)
- Education: University College Dublin; Nuffield College, Oxford
- Website: richardbruton.ie

Richard Bruton (born 15 March 1953) is an Irish former Fine Gael politician who served as a Teachta Dála (TD) for Dublin Bay North from 2016 to 2024, and previously from 1982 to 2016 for the Dublin North-Central constituency. He was the Chair of the Fine Gael parliamentary party from July 2020 to September 2023. He previously served as Minister for Communications, Climate Action and Environment from 2018 to 2020, Minister for Education and Skills from 2016 to 2018, Minister for Jobs, Enterprise and Innovation from 2011 to 2016, Deputy leader of Fine Gael from 2002 to 2010, Minister for Enterprise and Employment from 1994 to 1997 and Minister of State for Energy Affairs from 1986 to 1987. He was a Senator for the Agricultural Panel from 1981 to 1982.

== Early and private life ==
Bruton was born in Dublin in 1953, but grew up in Dunboyne, County Meath. He is a son of Joseph and Doris Bruton. He was educated at Belvedere College, Clongowes Wood College, University College Dublin and Nuffield College, Oxford. At Oxford, he graduated with a MPhil in Economics, his thesis being on the subject of Irish public debt. He is a research economist by profession. After university he worked at the Economic and Social Research Institute. This was followed by two years in the tobacco company P. J. Carroll, before moving on to his final private sector job at CRH.

He is the younger brother of John Bruton, who was Taoiseach from 1994 to 1997.

Bruton is married to Susan Meehan; they have four children, two sons and two daughters.

== Early political career: 1979–1992 ==
Bruton was elected to Meath County Council in 1979 and was elected to Seanad Éireann in 1981, as a Senator for the Agricultural Panel. At the February 1982 general election, he was elected to Dáil Éireann as a Fine Gael TD for the Dublin North-Central constituency. After an initial period on the backbenches, Bruton was appointed Minister of State at the Department of Energy, following the dismissal of Edward Collins in September 1986. In opposition after 1987, Bruton served in a number of front bench positions including, Energy, Natural Resources, Health, Enterprise and Employment and Director of Policy. He was also the campaign manager for his brother John Bruton's successful party leadership bid in 1990.

== Minister for Enterprise and Employment: 1994–1997 ==
Following the 1992 general election, Fianna Fáil and the Labour Party formed a coalition government, which collapsed in 1994. Bruton then helped to negotiate the Rainbow Coalition between Fine Gael, the Labour Party and Democratic Left. In that government, his brother John Bruton became Taoiseach. Bruton was appointed as Minister for Enterprise and Employment.

== Return to Opposition: 1997–2011 ==
A return to opposition in 1997 saw Bruton become opposition spokesperson on Education and Science, a position he held until he was appointed Director of Policy and Press Director in a reshuffle in 2000. After losing the 2002 party leadership election to Enda Kenny, Bruton was retained on the front bench and promoted to deputy leader as well as spokesperson on Finance. After an unsuccessful leadership challenge in 2010, he was demoted to spokesperson on Enterprise, Trade and Innovation.

=== Dublin City Council: 1999–2003 ===
He was elected to Dublin City Council in 1999, representing the Artane local electoral area. He relinquished this seat when dual mandates were banned in 2003.

=== Fine Gael leadership election: 2002 ===
Fine Gael had a disastrous election result at the 2002 general election; Bruton was one of the few frontbench Fine Gael TDs to retain his seat. The party lost 23 of its 54 TDs; party leader Michael Noonan soon resigned following the poll. Bruton stood as a candidate in the subsequent leadership election. He was defeated by Enda Kenny, but he was appointed deputy leader of Fine Gael and spokesperson for Finance, posts he maintained until 2010.

=== Deputy leader and spokesperson on Finance: 2002–2010 ===
Bruton was appointed Finance spokesperson in 2002. In that role, he was a consistent critic of government economic policy. In particular, he warned about the government's overreliance on the property sector and said that the government was ignoring the erosion of competitiveness and the loss of export market share as a growing construction sector temporarily insulated the economy from their effects.

In 2006, he told the Dáil that the government had "doubled its dependence on the construction sector to support its revenue. A total of 25% of every tax euro spent by the government comes from the construction sector. We are not in a strong position; we are, in fact, in a vulnerable position".

Bruton raised concerns about the payment of benchmarking awards. In 2003, on behalf of Fine Gael, he proposed a motion that the payment of the remaining phases of benchmarking be suspended pending implementation of a serious reform package so that the €1.3 Billion cost of benchmarking would be matched by commensurate improvements in public services.

=== Fine Gael leadership challenge: 2010 ===
On 14 June 2010, Bruton was sacked as deputy leader and spokesperson on Finance, by his leader Enda Kenny, after he informed his colleagues that he would be proposing a leadership challenge against Kenny. Kenny explained that he and Bruton had had a series of discussions in which Bruton said he had lost confidence in him. Kenny later told the media that "Richard's decision leaves me with no option but to relieve him of all his responsibilities". He also said that "some unnamed people have done huge damage to Fine Gael through their anonymous comments to the media which has resulted in an opinion poll dominating the news agenda". He then assigned responsibility for the Finance portfolio to Deputy Kieran O'Donnell.

The first TD to come out in support of Bruton before his sacking was frontbencher Fergus O'Dowd from County Louth. Nine other members of the front bench publicly expressed no confidence in Kenny's leadership. These included Leo Varadkar, Simon Coveney, Brian Hayes and Olivia Mitchell.

On 17 June 2010, a meeting of the parliamentary party was held and the 70 members cast their vote. The outcome was that the parliamentary party voted confidence in Enda Kenny as leader. Bruton then declined to comment as to whether he would serve in Kenny's front bench, despite saying earlier that it would be hypocritical to do so. On 1 July 2010, he was appointed by Kenny as spokesperson on Enterprise, Trade and Innovation.

== Return to Government: 2011–2020 ==
=== Minister for Jobs, Enterprise and Innovation: 2011–2016 ===
Bruton was appointed by the new Taoiseach Enda Kenny as Minister for Jobs, Enterprise and Innovation on 9 March 2011.

Bruton launched the first annual Action Plan for Jobs in 2012. The Plan's high-level target was to create 100,000 net new jobs by 2016. Bruton announced in May 2015, that the target to create 100,000 additional new jobs had been hit almost two years early. The Action Plan is based on setting realistic targets and focusing on them until the measures required are in place. In The Irish Times in early 2014, Stephen Collins wrote approvingly that "hundreds of commitments in the programme are steadily being delivered by Minister for Jobs Richard Bruton" and a year later described the annual plan which is "driven by Minister for Jobs Richard Bruton" as being "one of the outstanding success stories of the Coalition’s term". In an editorial the Irish Independent said that Bruton deserves credit for the manner in which the Action Plan for Jobs has been crafted and implemented across a range of government departments over the last three years. A review of the Action Plan for Jobs by the Organisation for Economic Co-operation and Development (OECD) concluded it had led to two significant developments in Irish public governance. One is a concerted whole of government policy implementation with political backing and oversight at the highest level. The other important development noted by the OECD is the rigorous quarterly monitoring and reporting system modelled on the Troika programme.

While campaigning for the government before the European Fiscal Compact referendum on 17 May 2012, Bruton admitted on live radio the possibility of there being a second referendum if the Irish people voted "No".

=== Minister for Education and Skills: 2016–2018 ===
Following the 2016 general election, there was a delay in government formation. On 9 May 2016, after talks had concluded on forming a new government, Enda Kenny appointed Bruton as Minister for Education and Skills. Bruton launched the first Action Plan for Education in September 2016. The Plan's high-level ambition is to make Ireland's education and training system the best in Europe by 2026. Following the election of Leo Varadkar as Taoiseach, Bruton was reappointed as Minister for Education and Skills on 14 June 2017.

=== Minister for Communications, Climate Action and Environment: 2018–2020 ===
After Minister Denis Naughten's resignation from government due to controversy surrounding the National Broadband Plan, Bruton became Minister for Communications, Climate Action and Environment on 11 October 2018. He was re-elected at the general election in February 2020, but was not appointed to cabinet in the Government of the 33rd Dáil.

On 22 July 2020, Bruton was elected chair of the Fine Gael parliamentary party. He served as chair until September 2023, when he was succeeded by Alan Dillon.

On 5 September 2023, he announced that he would not contest the next general election.

Political offices
Preceded by Edward Collins	Minister of State at the Department of Energy; 1986–1987	Succeeded by Michael Smith
Preceded by Charlie McCreevy	Minister for Enterprise and Employment; 1994–1997	Succeeded by Mary Harney as Minister for Enterprise, Trade and Employment
Preceded by Mary Hanafin as Minister for Enterprise, Trade and Innovation	Minister for Jobs, Enterprise and Innovation; 2011–2016	Succeeded by Mary Mitchell O'Connor
Preceded by Jan O'Sullivan	Minister for Education and Skills; 2016–2018	Succeeded by Joe McHugh
Preceded by Denis Naughten	Minister for Communications, Climate Action and Environment; 2018–2020	Succeeded by Eamon Ryan as Minister for the Environment, Climate and Communications
Party political offices
Preceded by Jim Mitchell	Deputy leader of Fine Gael; 2002–2010	Succeeded by James Reilly
Preceded by Martin Heydon	Chair of the Fine Gael parliamentary party 2020–2023	Succeeded by Alan Dillon
Honorary titles
Preceded by Enda Kenny	Father of the Dáil (with Willie O'Dea); 2020–2024	Incumbent

Dáil	Election	Deputy (Party)	Deputy (Party)	Deputy (Party)	Deputy (Party)
13th	1948	Vivion de Valera (FF)	Martin O'Sullivan (Lab)	Patrick McGilligan (FG)	3 seats 1948–1961
14th	1951	Vivion de Valera (FF)	Colm Gallagher (FF)	Patrick McGilligan (FG)	3 seats 1948–1961
15th	1954	Vivion de Valera (FF)	Maureen O'Carroll (Lab)	Patrick McGilligan (FG)	3 seats 1948–1961
16th	1957	Vivion de Valera (FF)	Colm Gallagher (FF)	Patrick McGilligan (FG)	3 seats 1948–1961
16th	1957 by-election	Vivion de Valera (FF)	Frank Sherwin (Ind.)	Patrick McGilligan (FG)	3 seats 1948–1961
17th	1961	Vivion de Valera (FF)	Frank Sherwin (Ind.)	Patrick McGilligan (FG)	Celia Lynch (FF)
18th	1965	Vivion de Valera (FF)	Michael O'Leary (Lab)	Luke Belton (FG)	Celia Lynch (FF)
19th	1969	George Colley (FF)	Michael O'Leary (Lab)	Luke Belton (FG)	Celia Lynch (FF)
20th	1973	George Colley (FF)	Michael O'Leary (Lab)	Luke Belton (FG)	Celia Lynch (FF)
21st	1977	Vincent Brady (FF)	Michael O'Leary (Lab)	Michael Keating (FG)	3 seats 1977–1981
22nd	1981	Vincent Brady (FF)	Charles Haughey (FF)	Noël Browne (SLP)	George Birmingham (FG)
23rd	1982 (Feb)	Vincent Brady (FF)	Charles Haughey (FF)	Richard Bruton (FG)	George Birmingham (FG)
24th	1982 (Nov)	Vincent Brady (FF)	Charles Haughey (FF)	Richard Bruton (FG)	George Birmingham (FG)
25th	1987	Vincent Brady (FF)	Charles Haughey (FF)	Richard Bruton (FG)	George Birmingham (FG)
26th	1989	Vincent Brady (FF)	Charles Haughey (FF)	Richard Bruton (FG)	Ivor Callely (FF)
27th	1992	Seán Haughey (FF)	Derek McDowell (Lab)	Richard Bruton (FG)	Ivor Callely (FF)
28th	1997	Seán Haughey (FF)	Derek McDowell (Lab)	Richard Bruton (FG)	Ivor Callely (FF)
29th	2002	Seán Haughey (FF)	Finian McGrath (Ind.)	Richard Bruton (FG)	Ivor Callely (FF)
30th	2007	Seán Haughey (FF)	Finian McGrath (Ind.)	Richard Bruton (FG)	3 seats from 2007
31st	2011	Aodhán Ó Ríordáin (Lab)	Finian McGrath (Ind.)	Richard Bruton (FG)	3 seats from 2007
32nd	2016	Constituency abolished. See Dublin Bay North			

Dáil	Election	Deputy (Party)	Deputy (Party)	Deputy (Party)	Deputy (Party)	Deputy (Party)
32nd	2016	Denise Mitchell (SF)	Tommy Broughan (I4C)	Finian McGrath (Ind.)	Seán Haughey (FF)	Richard Bruton (FG)
33rd	2020	Denise Mitchell (SF)	Cian O'Callaghan (SD)	Aodhán Ó Ríordáin (Lab)	Seán Haughey (FF)	Richard Bruton (FG)
34th	2024	Denise Mitchell (SF)	Cian O'Callaghan (SD)	Barry Heneghan (Ind.)	Tom Brabazon (FF)	Naoise Ó Muirí (FG)
