= Government of the 25th Dáil =

Government of Ireland 1987 to 1989

20th government of Ireland
- Government of Ireland
- Date formed: 10 March 1987
- Date dissolved: 12 July 1989

People and organisations
- President: Patrick Hillery
- Taoiseach: Charles Haughey
- Tánaiste: Brian Lenihan
- Total no. of members: 15
- Member parties: Fianna Fáil
- Status in legislature: Minority government
- Opposition party: Fine Gael
- Opposition leader: Alan Dukes

History
- Election: 1987 general election
- Legislature terms: 25th Dáil; 18th Seanad
- Predecessor: 19th government
- Successor: 21st government

The 20th government of Ireland (10 March 1987 – 12 July 1989) was the government of Ireland formed after the 1987 general election to the 25th Dáil on 17 February 1987. It was a minority Fianna Fáil government which had the qualified support of Fine Gael, the main opposition party, an arrangement known as the Tallaght Strategy after a speech by its leader Alan Dukes. The national debt had doubled under the previous government. The government introduced budget cuts in all departments. The taxation system was also reformed. One of the major schemes put forward was the establishment of the International Financial Services Centre (IFSC) in Dublin. During this period the Government organised the 1,000-year anniversary of the founding of Dublin.

It lasted 2 years, 111 days from its appointment until the resignation of Haughey on 29 June 1989, and continued to carry out its duties for a further 13 days until the appointment of the successor government, giving a total of 2 years, 124 days.

== Nomination of Taoiseach ==
The 25th Dáil first met on 10 March 1987. In the debate on the nomination of Taoiseach, leader of Fine Gael and outgoing Taoiseach Garret FitzGerald, leader of Fianna Fáil Charles Haughey, and leader of the Progressive Democrats Desmond O'Malley were each proposed. FitzGerald was defeated with 51 votes in favour to 114 against, while there was an equal number of votes of 82 cast in favour and against Haughey. The proposal was carried on the casting vote of the Ceann Comhairle. Haughey was appointed as Taoiseach by president Patrick Hillery.

10 March 1987; Nomination of Charles Haughey (FF) as Taoiseach; Motion proposed by Brian Lenihan and seconded by Gerry Collins; Absolute majority: 84/166
Vote	Parties	Votes
Yes	Fianna Fáil (81), Independent Fianna Fáil (1)	82 / 166
No	Fine Gael (51), Progressive Democrats (14), Labour Party (12), Workers' Party (4), Democratic Socialist Party (1)	82 / 166
Not voting	Independent (1)	1 / 166
Ceann Comhairle Seán Treacy exercised his casting vote in favour of the nomination of Haughey.

== Government ministers ==
After his appointment as Taoiseach by the president, Haughey proposed the members of the government and they were approved by the Dáil. They were appointed by the president on the same day.

Office	Name	Term
Taoiseach	Charles Haughey	1987–1989
Minister for the Gaeltacht	Charles Haughey	1987–1989
Tánaiste	Brian Lenihan	1987–1989
Minister for Foreign Affairs	Brian Lenihan	1987–1989
Minister for Finance	Ray MacSharry	1987–1988
Minister for the Public Service (Note: The functions of the Department of the Public Service were transferred to the Department of Finance on 19 March 1987.) (Note: The Department of the Public Service was renamed the Department of Tourism and Transport on 20 March 1987.)	Ray MacSharry	Mar. 1987
Minister for Agriculture and Food (Note: The Department of Agriculture was renamed the Department of Agriculture and Food on 31 March 1987.)	Michael O'Kennedy	1987–1989
Minister for Communications	John Wilson	Mar. 1987
Minister for Defence	Michael J. Noonan	1987–1989
Minister for Education	Mary O'Rourke	1987–1989
Minister for Energy	Ray Burke	1987–1988
Minister for the Environment	Pádraig Flynn	1987–1989
Minister for Health	Rory O'Hanlon	1987–1989
Minister for Industry and Commerce	Albert Reynolds	1987–1988
Minister for Justice	Gerry Collins	1987–1989
Minister for Labour	Bertie Ahern	1987–1989
Minister for the Marine (Note: The Department of Tourism, Fisheries and Forestry was renamed the Department of the Marine with effect from 19 March 1987.)	Brendan Daly	1987–1989
Minister for Social Welfare	Michael Woods	1987–1989
=== Changes 31 March 1987 === Reassignment of roles.
Office	Name	Term
Minister for Communications	Ray Burke	1987–1989
Minister for Tourism and Transport (Note: Transport was transferred from the Department of Communications on 31 March 1987.)	John Wilson	1987–1989
=== Changes 24 November 1988 === Following the appointment of Ray MacSharry as European Commissioner.
Office	Name	Term
Minister for Finance	Albert Reynolds	1988–1989
Minister for Industry and Commerce	Ray Burke	1988–1989
Minister for Energy	Michael Smith	1988–1989

Changes to Departments

== Attorney General ==
On 10 March 1987 John L. Murray SC was appointed by the president as Attorney General on the nomination of the Taoiseach.

== Ministers of state ==
On 10 March 1987, the Government appointed Vincent Brady, Michael Smith, Joe Walsh, Séamus Brennan, Seán McCarthy and Séamus Kirk as Ministers of State on the nomination of the Taoiseach. On 12 March 1987, the Government appointed the other Ministers of State on the nomination of the Taoiseach.

Name	Department(s)	Responsibility
Vincent Brady	Taoiseach; Defence	Government Chief Whip
Michael Smith	Tourism, Fisheries and Forestry	Forestry
Joe Walsh	Agriculture and Food	Food Industry
Séamus Brennan	Industry and Commerce	Trade and Marketing
Seán McCarthy	Industry and Commerce	Science and Technology
Séamus Kirk	Agriculture and Food	Horticulture
Máire Geoghegan-Quinn	Taoiseach	Co-ordination of Government policy and EC matters
Noel Treacy	Finance	
Pat "the Cope" Gallagher	Marine	Marine matters
Denis Lyons	Tourism, Fisheries and Forestry	Tourism
Denis Gallagher	Gaeltacht	
Ger Connolly	Environment	Urban Renewal
Seán Calleary	Foreign Affairs	Overseas Aid
Terry Leyden	Health	
Frank Fahey	Education	Youth and Sport
=== Changes 31 March 1987 === Changes of ministerial functions.
Name	Department(s)	Responsibility
Michael Smith	Energy	Forestry
Denis Lyons	Tourism and Transport	Tourism
=== Changes 30 June 1988 === New position created.
Name	Department(s)	Responsibility
Noel Treacy	Taoiseach	Heritage Affairs
=== Changes 25 November 1988 === On appointment of Michael Smith as Minister for Energy.
Name	Department(s)	Responsibility
Liam Aylward	Energy	

== Government policy ==
=== Economy ===
The 20th government passed three budgets through the 1987, 1988 and 1989 Finance Acts The Finance minister Ray MacSharry committed himself to bringing order to the public finances and the poor economic situation. His cutting of state spending earned him the nickname Mack the Knife.

During this time he came to be identified as Haughey's heir apparent as Taoiseach and Fianna Fáil leader. MacSharry, however wanted to leave politics by the time he was forty-five. He was fifty and had achieved some of the highest offices in the Irish government. In 1988 MacSharry was appointed European Commissioner, ending his domestic political career.

The Minister for Industry and Commerce Albert Reynolds blocked the hostile takeover of Irish Distillers by Grand Metropolitan. The company was eventually sold to Pernod Ricard for $440 million.

=== Health ===
During this period major industrial action was taken by junior doctors. 1,800 doctors went on strike to protest their lack of job security and the governments cuts to the health budget.

During this period a large number of haemophiliacs contracted HIV and Hepatitis C from contaminated blood products supplied by the Blood Transfusion Service Board.

=== Justice ===
In 1988 the Irish Prison officers association went on strike. The government had to use 1,000 Gardaí and 300 soldiers to guard the prisons.

=== Northern Ireland ===
During this period the government faced serious difficulties dealing with Northern Ireland and the IRA. After the signing of the Anglo-Irish Agreement Relations improved between the Republic and Britain. However, there were tensions between the governments over the imprisonment of the Birmingham Six and the apparent shoot-to-kill policy in Northern Ireland policy of the security forces in Northern Ireland. Formal protest was made by the government following the Loughgall ambush where eight IRA members and a civilian were killed by a SAS unit.

Relations improved with the extradition of Paul Kane. His appeal to the justice minister for freedom was rejected. Kane escaped from the Maze Prison in 1983 after being convicted of firearm offences.

During this period the IRA managed to smuggle a gun into the Four Courts in an attempted prison escape.

== Constitutional amendment ==
On 26 May 1987 the Tenth Amendment of the Constitution of Ireland was approved by referendum. This permitted the state to ratify the Single European Act.

== Dissolution and resignation ==
On 25 May 1989, the president dissolved the Dáil on the advice of Haughey. The general election was held on 15 June, the same date as the European Parliament election.

The 26th Dáil first met on 26 June 1989. The Dáil did not successfully nominate anyone for the position of Taoiseach on that day, with Charles Haughey, Alan Dukes and Dick Spring being defeated. This was the first time that this occurred on the first sitting of the Dáil after a general election. Haughey resigned as Taoiseach on 29 June but under the provisions of Article 28.11 of the Constitution, the members of the government continued to carry out their duties until their successors were appointed. The 21st government of Ireland was formed on 12 July 1989 as a coalition between Fianna Fáil and the Progressive Democrats, with Charles Haughey again serving as Taoiseach.
