= Minister for Social Protection =

Irish government cabinet minister

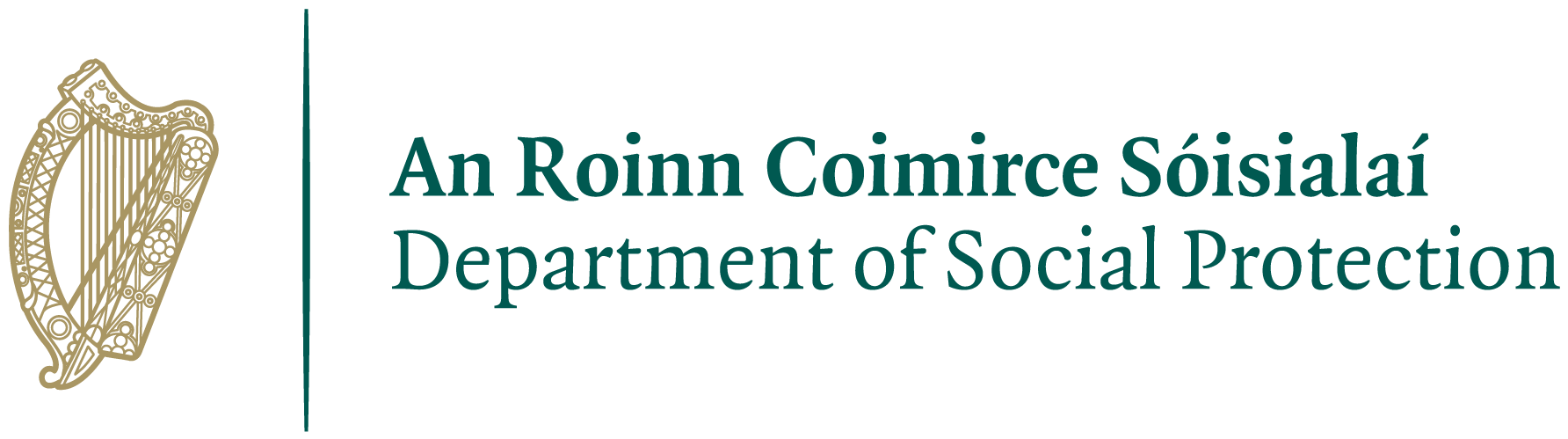

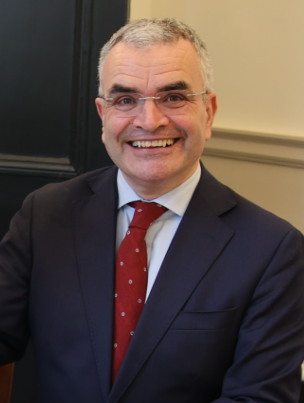
- Incumbent; Dara Calleary since 23 January 2025
- Department of Social Protection
- Type: Social security minister
- Status: Cabinet minister
- Member of: Government of Ireland; Council of the European Union; Dáil Éireann
- Reports to: Taoiseach
- Seat: Dublin, Ireland
- Nominator: Taoiseach
- Appointer: President of Ireland (on the advice of the Taoiseach)
- Inaugural holder: James Ryan as Minister for Social Welfare
- Formation: 22 January 1947
- Salary: €210,750 (2025) (including €115,953 TD salary)
- Website: Official website

The minister for social protection (Irish: An tAire Coimirce Sóisialaí) is a senior minister in the Government of Ireland and leads the Department of Social Protection.

The minister for social protection since January 2025 is Dara Calleary. He is also Minister for Rural and Community Development and the Gaeltacht.

== Overview ==
The position was created in 1947 as the minister for social welfare. Its present title dates from 2020. The department formulates appropriate social protection policies and administers and manages the delivery of statutory and non-statutory schemes and services. It is also responsible for the delivery of a range of social insurance and social assistance schemes including provision for unemployment, illness, maternity, caring, widowhood, retirement and old age.

== List of office-holders ==
=== Minister for Social Welfare 1947–1997 ===
| Name | Term of office | | Party | Government(s) |
| James Ryan (1st time) (Note: Also Minister for Health.) | 22 January 1947 | 18 February 1948 | Fianna Fáil | 4th |
| William Norton | 18 February 1948 | 14 June 1951 | Labour | 5th |
| James Ryan (2nd time) | 14 June 1951 | 2 June 1954 | Fianna Fáil | 6th |
| Brendan Corish (1st time) | 2 June 1954 | 20 March 1957 | Labour | 7th |
| Paddy Smith | 20 March 1957 | 27 November 1957 | Fianna Fáil | 8th |
| Seán MacEntee | 27 November 1957 | 12 October 1961 | Fianna Fáil | 8th • 9th |
| Kevin Boland (1st time) | 12 October 1961 | 16 November 1966 | Fianna Fáil | 10th • 11th |
| Joseph Brennan (1st time) | 16 November 1966 | 2 July 1969 | Fianna Fáil | 12th |
| Kevin Boland (2nd time) | 2 July 1969 | 6 May 1970 | Fianna Fáil | 13th |
| Joseph Brennan (2nd time) | 6 May 1970 | 14 March 1973 | Fianna Fáil | 13th |
| Brendan Corish (2nd time) | 14 March 1973 | 5 July 1977 | Labour | 14th |
| Charles Haughey | 5 July 1977 | 12 December 1979 | Fianna Fáil | 15th |
| Michael Woods (1st time) | 12 December 1979 | 30 June 1981 | Fianna Fáil | 16th |
| Eileen Desmond | 30 June 1981 | 9 March 1982 | Labour | 17th |
| Michael Woods (2nd time) | 9 March 1982 | 14 December 1982 | Fianna Fáil | 18th |
| Barry Desmond | 14 December 1982 | 14 February 1986 | Labour | 19th |
| Gemma Hussey | 14 February 1986 | 10 March 1987 | Fine Gael | 19th |
| Michael Woods (3rd time) | 10 March 1987 | 13 November 1991 | Fianna Fáil | 20th • 21st |
| Brendan Daly | 13 November 1991 | 11 February 1992 | Fianna Fáil | 21st |
| Charlie McCreevy | 11 February 1992 | 12 January 1993 | Fianna Fáil | 22nd |
| Michael Woods (4th time) (Note: Also Minister for Health from 17 November to 15 December 1994.) | 12 January 1993 | 15 December 1994 | Fianna Fáil | 23rd |
| Proinsias De Rossa | 15 December 1994 | 26 June 1997 | Democratic Left | 24th |
=== Minister for Social, Community and Family Affairs 1997–2002 ===
| Name | Term of office | | Party | Government(s) |
| Dermot Ahern | 26 June 1997 | 6 June 2002 | Fianna Fáil | 25th |
=== Minister for Social and Family Affairs 2002–2010 ===
| Name | Term of office | | Party | Government(s) |
| Mary Coughlan | 6 June 2002 | 29 September 2004 | Fianna Fáil | 26th |
| Séamus Brennan | 29 September 2004 | 14 June 2007 | Fianna Fáil | 26th |
| Martin Cullen | 14 June 2007 | 7 May 2008 | Fianna Fáil | 27th |
| Mary Hanafin | 7 May 2008 | 23 March 2010 | Fianna Fáil | 28th |
=== Minister for Social Protection 2010–2017 ===
| Name | Term of office | | Party | Government(s) |
| Éamon Ó Cuív (Note: Also Minister for Defence from 20 January to 9 March 2011 and Minister for the Environment, Heritage and Local Government from 23 January to 9 March 2011.) | 23 March 2010 | 9 March 2011 | Fianna Fáil | 28th |
| Joan Burton | 9 March 2011 | 6 May 2016 | Labour | 29th |
| Leo Varadkar | 6 May 2016 | 14 June 2017 | Fine Gael | 30th |
=== Minister for Employment Affairs and Social Protection 2017–2020 ===
| Name | Term of office | | Party | Government(s) |
| Regina Doherty | 14 June 2017 | 27 June 2020 | Fine Gael | 31st |
=== Minister for Social Protection 2020–present ===
| Name | Term of office | | Party | Government(s) |
| Heather Humphreys (Note: Also Minister for Rural and Community Development and (from 27 April to 1 November 2021 and from 25 November to 17 December 2022) Minister for Justice.) | 27 June 2020 | 23 January 2025 | Fine Gael | 32nd • 33rd • 34th |
| Dara Calleary (Note: Also Minister for Rural and Community Development and the Gaeltacht.) | 23 January 2025 | Incumbent | Fianna Fáil | 35th |
