= Government of the 12th Dáil =

Irish government from 1944 to 1948

4th government of Ireland
- Government of Ireland

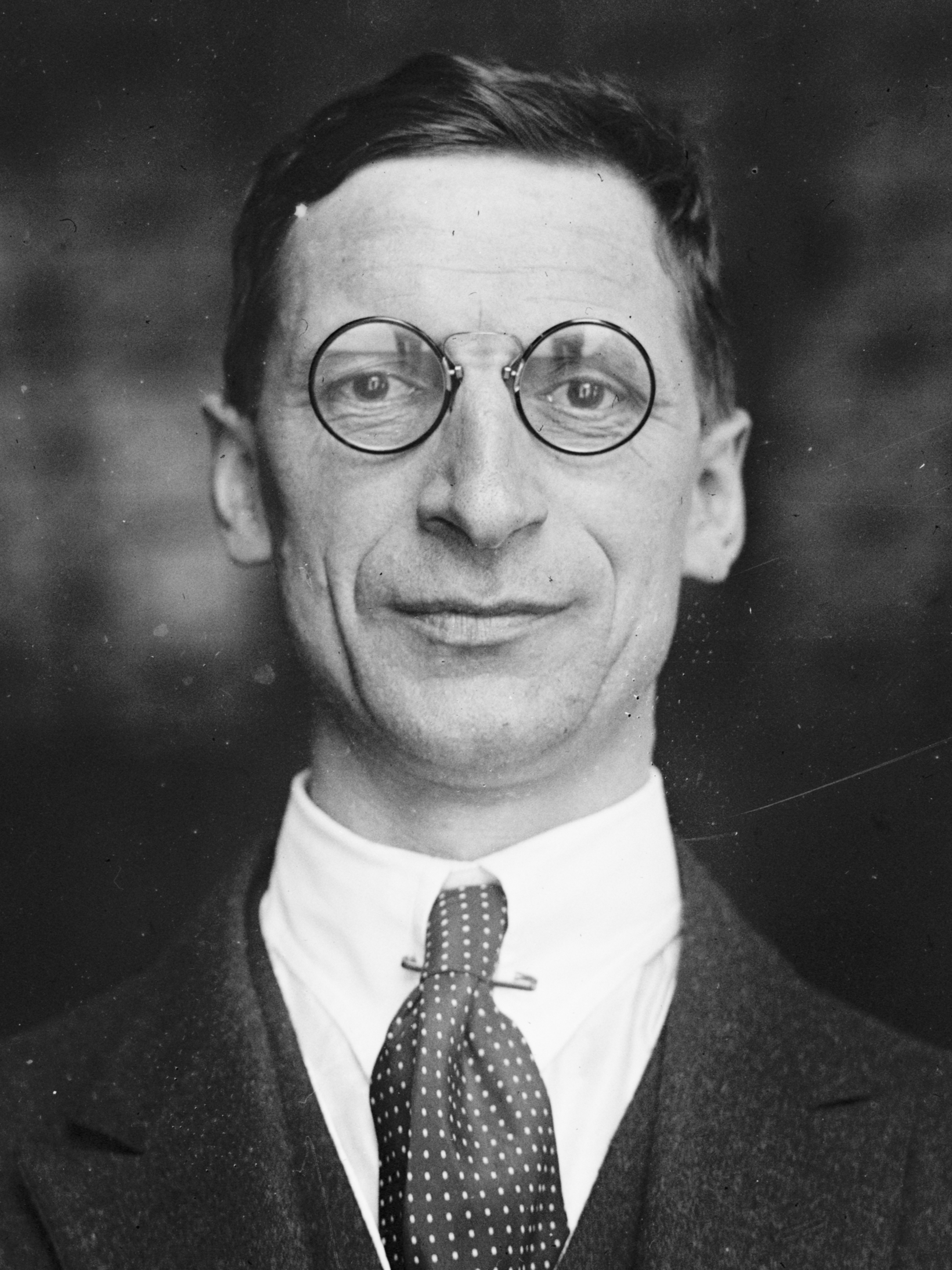
- Date formed: 9 June 1944
- Date dissolved: 18 February 1948

People and organisations
- President: Douglas Hyde (1944–1945); Seán T. O'Kelly (1945–1948)
- Taoiseach: Éamon de Valera
- Tánaiste: Seán T. O'Kelly (1944–1945); Seán Lemass (1945–1948)
- Total no. of members: 12 (1944–1947); 14 (1947–1948)
- Member party: Fianna Fáil
- Status in legislature: Majority Government; 76 / 138 (55%)
- Opposition party: Fine Gael
- Opposition leader: Richard Mulcahy

History
- Election: 1944 general election
- Legislature terms: 12th Dáil; 5th Seanad
- Predecessor: 3rd government
- Successor: 5th government

The 4th Government of Ireland (9 June 1944 – 18 February 1948) was the government of Ireland formed after the 1944 general election to the 12th Dáil held on 30 May. It was a single-party Fianna Fáil government led by Éamon de Valera as Taoiseach. It lasted for 3 years, 254 days. Fianna Fáil had been in office since the 1932 general election.

== Nomination of Taoiseach ==
The 12th Dáil first met on 9 June 1944. In the debate on the nomination of Taoiseach, Fianna Fáil leader and outgoing Taoiseach Éamon de Valera was proposed. This motion was approved by 81 to 37. De Valera was appointed as Taoiseach by President Douglas Hyde.

9 June 1944; Nomination of Éamon de Valera (FF) as Taoiseach; Motion proposed by Michael Kennedy and seconded by Timothy O'Sullivan; Absolute majority: 70/138
Vote	Parties	Votes
Yes	Fianna Fáil (75), National Labour Party (3), Independents (3)	81 / 138
No	Fine Gael (29), Labour Party (7), Independent (1)	37 / 138
Absent of Not voting	Clann na Talmhan (9), Independents (7), Fine Gael (1), Labour Party (1), National Labour Party (1), Ceann Comhairle (1)	20 / 138

== Members of the government ==
After his appointment as Taoiseach by the president, Éamon de Valera proposed the members of the government and they were approved by the Dáil. They were appointed by the president on the same day.

Office	Name
Taoiseach	Éamon de Valera
Minister for External Affairs	Éamon de Valera
Tánaiste	Seán T. O'Kelly
Minister for Finance	Seán T. O'Kelly
Minister for Industry and Commerce	Seán Lemass
Minister for Supplies (Note: The functions of the Minister for Supplies were transferred to the Minister for Industry and Commerce on 1 August 1945.)	Seán Lemass
Minister for Local Government and Public Health (Note: The Department of Local Government and Public Health was renamed as the Department of Local Government on 22 January 1947.)	Seán MacEntee
Minister for Agriculture	James Ryan
Minister for the Co-ordination of Defensive Measures	Frank Aiken
Minister for Education	Thomas Derrig
Minister for Justice	Gerald Boland
Minister for Defence	Oscar Traynor
Minister for Posts and Telegraphs	Patrick Little
Minister for Lands	Seán Moylan
=== Changes 19 June 1945 === On the election of Seán T. O'Kelly as president of Ireland.
Office	Name
Tánaiste	Seán Lemass
Minister for Finance	Frank Aiken
=== Changes 22 January 1947 === On the creation of the Department of Health and the Department of Social Welfare.
Office	Name
Minister for Local Government	Seán MacEntee
Minister for Health	James Ryan
Minister for Social Welfare	James Ryan
Minister for Agriculture	Paddy Smith

== Parliamentary Secretaries ==
On 9 June, the Government appointed Parliamentary Secretaries on the nomination of the Taoiseach.

Name	Office	Term
Eamon Kissane	Government Chief Whip	1944–1948
Eamon Kissane	Parliamentary Secretary to the Minister for Defence	1944–1948
Paddy Smith	Parliamentary Secretary to the Minister for Finance	1944–1946
Conn Ward	Parliamentary Secretary to the Minister for Local Government and Public Health	1944–1946
Seán O'Grady	Parliamentary Secretary to the Minister for Industry and Commerce	1944–1946
Erskine H. Childers	Parliamentary Secretary to the Minister for Local Government and Public Health	1944–1948
=== Change 13 July 1946 === Resignation of Conn Ward following the report of the Ward Tribunal.
=== Changes 1 January 1947 ===
Paddy Smith	Parliamentary Secretary to the Minister for Agriculture	Jan. 1947
Seán O'Grady	Parliamentary Secretary to the Minister for Finance	1947–1948
