= Government of the 22nd Dáil =

Government of Ireland 1981 to 1982

17th government of Ireland
- Government of Ireland

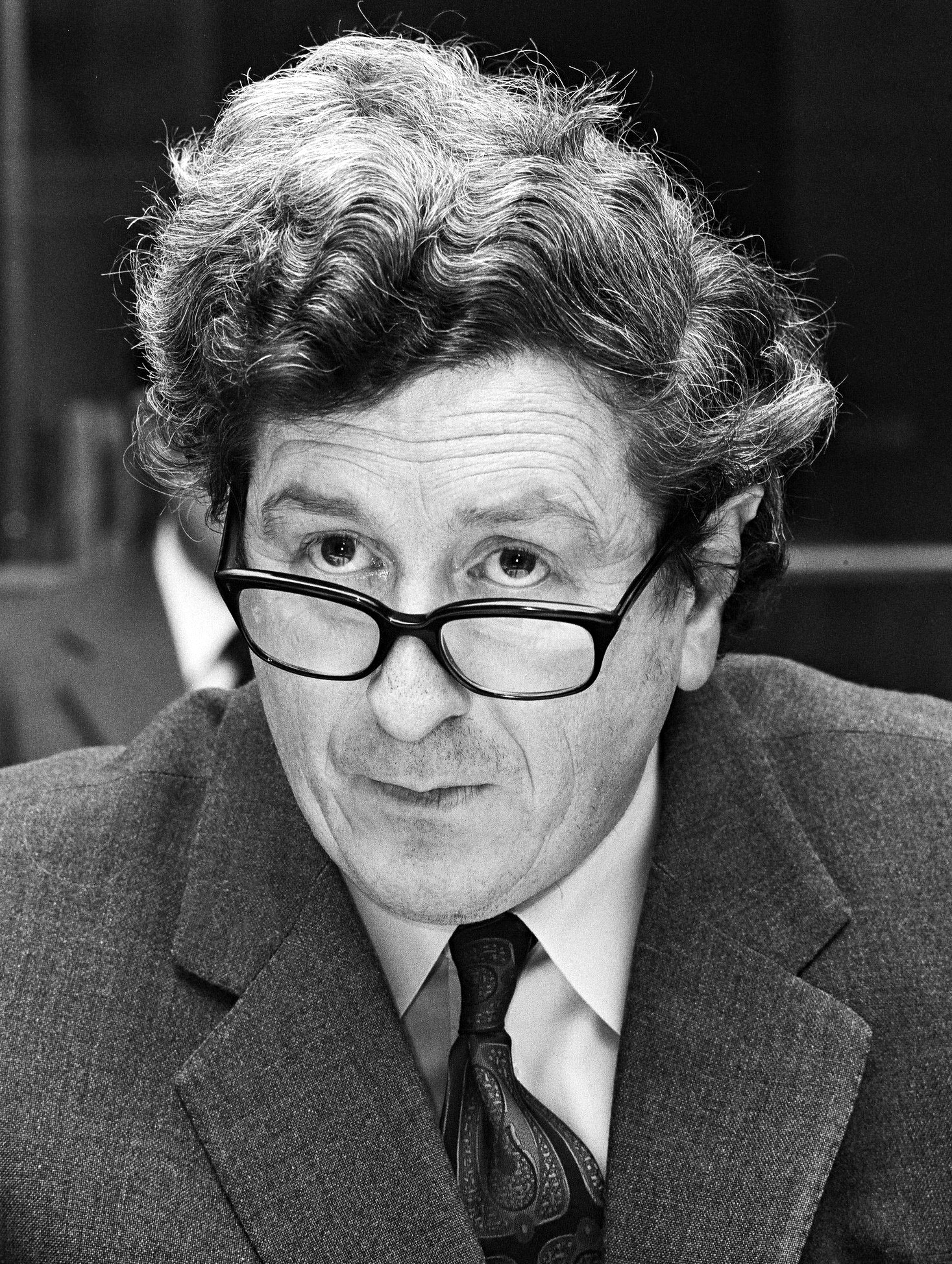
- Garrett FitzGerald
- Date formed: 30 June 1981
- Date dissolved: 9 March 1982

People and organisations
- President: Patrick Hillery
- Taoiseach: Garret FitzGerald
- Tánaiste: Michael O'Leary
- Total no. of members: 15
- Member parties: Fine Gael; Labour Party
- Status in legislature: Minority Coalition
- Opposition party: Fianna Fáil
- Opposition leader: Charles Haughey

History
- Election: 1981 general election
- Legislature terms: 22nd Dáil; 15th Seanad
- Predecessor: 16th government
- Successor: 18th government

The 17th government of Ireland (30 June 1981 – 9 March 1982) was the government of Ireland formed after the 1981 general election to the 22nd Dáil. It was a minority coalition government of Fine Gael and the Labour Party led by Garret FitzGerald as Taoiseach and lasted for 252 days.

== Nomination of Taoiseach ==
The 22nd Dáil first met on 30 June 1981. In the debate on the nomination of Taoiseach, Fianna Fáil leader and outgoing Taoiseach Charles Haughey, and Fine Gael leader Garret FitzGerald were both proposed. The nomination of Haughey was defeated with 79 votes in favour to 83 against, while the nomination of FitzGerald was carried with 81 in favour and 78 against. FitzGerald was appointed as Taoiseach by President Patrick Hillery.

30 June 1981; Nomination of Garret FitzGerald (FG) as Taoiseach; Motion proposed by Oliver J. Flanagan and seconded by Ivan Yates; Absolute majority: 84/166
Vote	Parties	Votes
Yes	Fine Gael (65), Labour Party (15), Jim Kemmy (1)	81 / 166
No	Fianna Fáil (78)	78 / 166
Not voting	Ceann Comhairle (1), Socialist Labour Party (1), Sinn Féin The Workers' Party (1), Independent Fianna Fáil (1), Seán Dublin Bay Rockall Loftus (1)	5 / 166
In prison	Anti H-Block (2)	2 / 166

== Government ministers ==
After his appointment as Taoiseach by the president, Garret FitzGerald proposed the members of the government and they were approved by the Dáil. They were appointed by the president on the same day.

Office	Name	Term	Party
Taoiseach	Garret FitzGerald	1981–1982	Fine Gael
Tánaiste	Michael O'Leary	1981–1982	Labour
Minister for Industry and Energy (Note: On 21 August 1981, the Department of Energy was renamed as the Department of Industry and Energy.)	Michael O'Leary	1981–1982	Labour
Minister for Agriculture	Alan Dukes	1981–1982	Fine Gael
Minister for Defence	James Tully	1981–1982	Labour
Minister for Education	John Boland	1981–1982	Fine Gael
Minister for the Environment	Peter Barry	1981–1982	Fine Gael
Minister for Finance	John Bruton	1981–1982	Fine Gael
Minister for Fisheries and Forestry	Tom Fitzpatrick	1981–1982	Fine Gael
Minister for Foreign Affairs	John Kelly	1981 (acting)	Fine Gael
Minister for the Gaeltacht	Paddy O'Toole	1981–1982	Fine Gael
Minister for Health	Eileen Desmond	1981–1982	Labour
Minister for Social Welfare	Eileen Desmond	1981–1982	Labour
Minister for Justice	Jim Mitchell	1981–1982	Fine Gael
Minister for Labour	Liam Kavanagh	1981–1982	Labour
Minister for the Public Service	Liam Kavanagh	1981–1982	Labour
Minister for Posts and Telegraphs	Patrick Cooney	1981–1982	Fine Gael
Minister for Transport	Patrick Cooney	1981–1982	Fine Gael
Minister for Trade, Commerce and Tourism (Note: On 21 August 1981, the Department of Industry, Commerce and Tourism was renamed as the Department of Trade, Commerce and Tourism.)	John Kelly	1981–1982	Fine Gael
=== Change 21 October 1981 === Appointment of Sen. James Dooge, whose nomination had to await until after the election to Seanad Éireann.
Office	Name	Term	Party
Minister for Foreign Affairs	James Dooge	1981–1982	Fine Gael

== Attorney General ==
On 30 July 1981, Peter Sutherland SC was appointed by the president as Attorney General on the nomination of the Taoiseach.

== Ministers of state ==
On 30 June 1981, the Government appointed Ministers of State on the nomination of the Taoiseach.

Name	Department(s)	Responsibility	Party
Gerry L'Estrange	Taoiseach	Government Chief Whip	Fine Gael
Gerry L'Estrange	Defence	Defence	Fine Gael
Edward Collins	Industry and Energy	Oil and Minerals Exploration	Fine Gael
Fergus O'Brien	Environment	Housing	Fine Gael
Donal Creed	Health	Health	Fine Gael
Mary Flaherty	Social Welfare	Poverty and the Family	Fine Gael
Joseph Bermingham	Finance	Office of Public Works	Labour
Barry Desmond	Finance	Economic Planning	Labour
Michael Begley	Trade, Commerce and Tourism	Tourism	Fine Gael
Michael Keating	Education	Youth and Sport	Fine Gael
Dick Spring	Justice	Law Reform	Labour
Michael D'Arcy	Agriculture	Production and Marketing	Fine Gael
Ted Nealon	Agriculture	Western Development	Fine Gael
Jim O'Keeffe	Foreign Affairs	Overseas Development	Fine Gael
=== Change 10 July 1981 === Additional appointment
Name	Department(s)	Responsibility	Party
Paddy Harte	Posts and Telegraphs	Telecommunications	Fine Gael
=== Change 24 July 1981 === Additional appointment
Name	Department(s)	Responsibility	Party
Mary Flaherty	Health		Fine Gael
=== Changes 11 November 1981 === Reshuffle on grounds of health of L'Estrange.
Name	Department(s)	Responsibility	Party
Fergus O'Brien	Taoiseach	Government Chief Whip	Fine Gael
Fergus O'Brien	Defence	Defence	Fine Gael
Donal Creed	Environment	Housing	Fine Gael
Gerry L'Estrange	Health	Health	Fine Gael

== Budget ==
On 27 January 1982, the Minister for Finance John Bruton proposed the budget, which was rejected by the Dáil.

27 January 1982; Financial Resolutions, 1982; Absolute majority: 84/166
Vote	Parties	Votes
Yes	Fine Gael (65), Labour Party (15), Socialist Labour Party (1)	81 / 166
No	Fianna Fáil (78), Sinn Féin The Workers' Party (1), Independent Fianna Fáil (1), Jim Kemmy (1), Seán Dublin Bay Rockall Loftus (1)	82 / 166
Not voting	Ceann Comhairle (1)	1 / 166
In prison	Anti H-Block (1)	1 / 166
Vacancy	1	1 / 166

The Taoiseach sought a dissolution of the Dáil, which was granted by the president, leading to the February 1982 general election.
