= Minister of State at the Department of Culture, Communications and Sport =

List of Irish Ministers of State

The minister of state at the Department of Culture, Communications and Sport is a junior ministerial post in the Department of Culture, Communications and Sport of the Government of Ireland who may perform functions delegated by the minister for culture, communications and sport. A minister of state does not hold cabinet rank.

There is currently one minister of state:

- Charlie McConalogue, TD – Minister of State for sport and postal policy

== List of ministers of state ==
=== Department of Industry and Energy 1981–1983 ===
| Name | Term of office | | Party | Responsibilities | Government |
| Edward Collins | 30 June 1981 | 9 March 1982 | Fine Gael | Oil and Minerals Exploration | 17th |
| Jim Fitzsimons | 28 October 1982 | 14 December 1982 | Fianna Fáil | Economic Affairs | 18th |
| Edward Collins | 16 December 1982 | 15 December 1983 | Fine Gael | Energy Affairs | 19th |
=== Department of Energy 1983–1993 ===
| Name | Term of office | | Party | Responsibilities | Government |
| Edward Collins | 13 February 1986 | 23 September 1986 | Fine Gael | Commerce and Services | 19th |
| Richard Bruton | 23 September 1986 | 10 March 1987 | Fine Gael | Energy Affairs | 19th |
| Michael Smith | 31 March 1987 | 24 November 1988 | Fianna Fáil | Forestry | 20th |
| Liam Aylward | 25 November 1988 | 12 July 1989 | Fianna Fáil | | 20th |
=== Department of Tourism and Trade 1993–1997 ===
| Name | Term of office | | Party | Responsibilities | Government |
| Toddy O'Sullivan | 20 December 1994 | 26 June 1997 | Labour | | 24th |
=== Department of Tourism, Sport and Recreation 1997–2002 ===
| Name | Term of office | | Party | Responsibilities | Government |
| Chris Flood | 8 July 1997 | 1 February 2000 | Fianna Fáil | Local development and the National Drugs Strategy Team | 25th |
| Eoin Ryan | 1 February 2000 | 6 June 2002 | Fianna Fáil | Local development | 25th |
=== Department of Arts, Sport and Tourism 2002–2010 ===
| Name | Term of office | | Party | Responsibilities | Government |
| Martin Mansergh | 13 May 2008 | 2 May 2010 | Fianna Fáil | Arts | 28th |
=== Department of Tourism, Culture and Sport 2010–2011 ===
| Martin Mansergh | 2 May 2010 | 9 March 2011 | Fianna Fáil | Arts | 28th |
=== Department of Arts, Heritage and the Gaeltacht 2011–2016 ===
| Name | Term of office | | Party | Responsibilities | Government |
| Dinny McGinley | 10 March 2011 | 15 July 2014 | Fine Gael | Gaeltacht Affairs | 29th |
| Joe McHugh | 15 July 2014 | 6 May 2016 | Fine Gael | Gaeltacht Affairs | 29th |
| Aodhán Ó Ríordáin | 15 July 2014 | 6 May 2016 | Labour | New Communities, Culture and Equality | 29th |
=== Department of Arts, Heritage, Regional, Rural and Gaeltacht Affairs 2016–2017 ===
| Name | Term of office | | Party | Responsibilities | Government |
| Seán Kyne | 19 May 2016 | 14 June 2017 | Fine Gael | Gaeltacht Affairs | 30th |
| Michael Ring | 19 May 2016 | 14 June 2017 | Fine Gael | Regional Economic Development | 30th |
=== Department of Culture, Heritage and the Gaeltacht 2017–2020 ===
| Name | Term of office | | Party | Responsibilities | Government |
| Joe McHugh | 14 June 2017 | 16 October 2018 | Fine Gael | Gaeilge, Gaeltacht and the Islands | 31st |
| Seán Kyne | 16 October 2018 | 27 June 2020 | Fine Gael | Gaeilge, Gaeltacht and the Islands | 31st |
| Dara Calleary | 1 July 2020 | 15 July 2020 | Fianna Fáil | Gaeltacht | 32nd |
=== Department of Tourism, Culture, Arts, Gaeltacht, Sport and Media 2020–2025 ===
| Name | Term of office | | Party | Responsibilities | Government |
| Jack Chambers | 15 July 2020 | 17 December 2022 | Fianna Fáil | Gaeltacht and Sport | 32nd |
| Patrick O'Donovan | 21 December 2022 | 9 April 2024 | Fine Gael | Gaeltacht | 33rd |
| Thomas Byrne | 21 December 2022 | 9 April 2024 | Fianna Fáil | Sport | 33rd |
| Thomas Byrne | 10 April 2024 | 23 January 2025 | Fianna Fáil | Gaeltacht and Sport | 34th |
=== Department of Culture, Communications and Sport 2025–present ===
| Name | Term of office | | Party | Responsibilities | Government |
| Charlie McConalogue | 29 January 2025 | Incumbent | Fianna Fáil | Sport and postal policy | 35th |
