= Government of the 23rd Dáil =

Government of Ireland March to December 1982

18th government of Ireland
- Government of Ireland

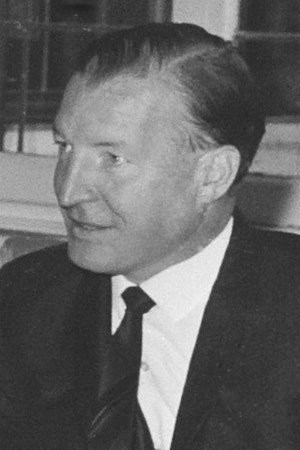
- Date formed: 9 March 1982
- Date dissolved: 14 December 1982

People and organisations
- President: Patrick Hillery
- Taoiseach: Charles Haughey
- Tánaiste: Ray MacSharry
- Total no. of members: 15
- Member party: Fianna Fáil
- Status in legislature: Minority government
- Opposition party: Fine Gael
- Opposition leader: Garret FitzGerald

History
- Election: Feb. 1982 general election
- Legislature terms: 23rd Dáil; 16th Seanad
- Predecessor: 17th government
- Successor: 19th government

The 18th government of Ireland (9 March – 14 December 1982) was the government of Ireland formed after the February 1982 general election to the 23rd Dáil. It was a minority Fianna Fáil government led by Charles Haughey as Taoiseach, reliant on the support of the Sinn Féin The Workers' Party and independent TD Tony Gregory. It lasted for 280 days.

== Nomination of Taoiseach ==
The 23rd Dáil first met on 9 March 1982. In the debate on the nomination of Taoiseach, Fianna Fáil leader Charles Haughey, and Fine Gael leader and outgoing Taoiseach Garret FitzGerald were both proposed. The nomination of Haughey was carried with 86 in favour and 79 against. Haughey was appointed as Taoiseach by president Patrick Hillery.

9 March 1982; Nomination of Charles Haughey (FF) as Taoiseach; Motion proposed by Brian Lenihan and seconded by Ray MacSharry; Absolute majority: 84/166
| Vote | Parties | Votes |
| Yes | Fianna Fáil (81), Sinn Féin The Workers' Party (3), Independent Fianna Fáil (1), Independent (1) | 86 / 166 |
| No | Fine Gael (63), Labour Party (15), Independent (1) | 79 / 166 |
| Not voting | Ceann Comhairle (1) | 1 / 166 |

== Government ministers ==
After his appointment as Taoiseach by the president, Charles Haughey proposed the members of the government and they were approved by the Dáil. They were appointed by the president on the same day.

| Office | Name | Term |
|---|---|---|
| Taoiseach | Charles Haughey | Mar.–Dec. 1982 |
| Tánaiste | Ray MacSharry | Mar.–Dec. 1982 |
| Minister for Finance | Ray MacSharry | Mar.–Dec. 1982 |
| Minister for Agriculture | Brian Lenihan | Mar.–Dec. 1982 |
| Minister for Defence | Paddy Power | Mar.–Dec. 1982 |
| Minister for Education | Martin O'Donoghue | Mar.–Oct. 1982 |
| Minister for the Environment | Ray Burke | Mar.–Dec. 1982 |
| Minister for Fisheries and Forestry | Brendan Daly | Mar.–Dec. 1982 |
| Minister for Foreign Affairs | Gerry Collins | Mar.–Dec. 1982 |
| Minister for the Gaeltacht | Pádraig Flynn | Mar.–Oct. 1982 |
| Minister for Health | Michael Woods | Mar.–Dec. 1982 |
| Minister for Social Welfare | Michael Woods | Mar.–Dec. 1982 |
| Minister for Industry and Energy | Albert Reynolds | Mar.–Dec. 1982 |
| Minister for Justice | Seán Doherty | Mar.–Dec. 1982 |
| Minister for Labour | Gene Fitzgerald | Mar.–Dec. 1982 |
| Minister for the Public Service | Gene Fitzgerald | Mar.–Dec. 1982 |
| Minister for Posts and Telegraphs | John Wilson | Mar.–Dec. 1982 |
| Minister for Transport | John Wilson | Mar.–Dec. 1982 |
| Minister for Trade, Commerce and Tourism | Desmond O'Malley | Mar.–Oct. 1982 |
=== Changes 7 October 1982 === Desmond O'Malley and Martin O'Donoghue resigned on 6 October 1982 after supporting an unsuccessful leadership challenge against Charles Haughey.
| Office | Name | Term |
| Minister for Trade, Commerce and Tourism | Albert Reynolds | 7–27 Oct 1982 |
| Minister for Education | Charles Haughey | 7–27 Oct 1982 |
=== Changes 27 October 1982 === Gallagher and Brady approved on a vote of 83 to 78.
| Office | Name | Term |
| Minister for Trade, Commerce and Tourism | Pádraig Flynn | Oct.–Dec. 1982 |
| Minister for Education | Gerard Brady | Oct.–Dec. 1982 |
| Minister for the Gaeltacht | Denis Gallagher | Oct.–Dec. 1982 |

== Attorney General ==
On 9 March 1982, Patrick Connolly SC was appointed by the president as Attorney General on the nomination of the Taoiseach. Connolly resigned on 17 August after Malcolm MacArthur, who had been a house-guest of Connolly's, was arrested for murder. On 18 August 1982, John L. Murray SC was appointed by the president as Attorney General on the nomination of the Taoiseach.

== Ministers of state ==
On 9 March, the Government appointed Bertie Ahern on the nomination of the Taoiseach to the post of Minister of State at the Department of the Taoiseach with special responsibility as Government Chief Whip. On 23 March, the Government appointed the other Ministers of State.

| Name | Department(s) | Responsibility | Party |
|---|---|---|---|
| Bertie Ahern | Taoiseach; Defence | Government Chief Whip | Fianna Fáil |
| Sylvester Barrett | Finance | Office of Public Works | Fianna Fáil |
| Lorcan Allen | Agriculture | Land Commission, Production and Marketing | Fianna Fáil |
| Bernard Cowen | Agriculture | Disadvantaged Areas | Fianna Fáil |
| Terry Leyden | Transport; Posts and Telegraphs | Telecommunications | Fianna Fáil |
| Máire Geoghegan-Quinn | Education | Youth and Sport | Fianna Fáil |
| Denis Gallagher | Social Welfare | Social Welfare Claims | Fianna Fáil |
| Ger Connolly | Environment | Housing | Fianna Fáil |
| Gerard Brady | Environment | Urban Renewal | Fianna Fáil |
| Tom McEllistrim | Fisheries and Forestry | Forestry | Fianna Fáil |
=== Changes 28 October 1982 === Following the appointment of Brady and Gallagher to cabinet.
| Name | Department(s) | Responsibility | Party |
| Rory O'Hanlon | Social Welfare | Social Welfare Claims | Fianna Fáil |
| Niall Andrews | Environment | Urban Renewal | Fianna Fáil |
| Seán Calleary | Trade, Commerce and Tourism | Tourism | Fianna Fáil |
| Jim Fitzsimons | Industry and Energy | Economic Affairs | Fianna Fáil |

== Confidence in the government ==
On 1 July 1982, the Dáil voted on a motion of confidence the Taoiseach placed in the government. The motion was carried by a vote of 84 to 77.

On 4 November 1982, the Dáil voted on a motion of confidence the Taoiseach placed in the government. The motion was defeated, the Workers' Party voting against Haughey, and Tony Gregory abstaining.

4 November 1982; Confidence in the Government; Motion proposed by Taoiseach Charles Haughey; Absolute majority: 84/166
| Vote | Parties | Votes |
| Yes | Fianna Fáil (79), Independent Fianna Fáil (1) | 80 / 166 |
| No | Fine Gael (63), Labour Party (15), Workers' Party (3), Independent (1) | 82 / 166 |
| Absent or Not voting | Ceann Comhairle (1), Fianna Fáil (1), Independent (1) | 3 / 166 |
| Vacancy | 1 | 1 / 166 |

After the vote, Haughey sought a dissolution of the Dáil, which was granted by the president. A second general election of that year was held on 24 November 1982 for the 24th Dáil.
