= Ted Nealon =

Irish politician and journalist (1929–2014)

Minister of State
- 1984–1987: Communications
- 1983–1984: Posts and Telegraphs
- 1982–1987: Taoiseach
- 1981–1982: Agriculture

Teachta Dála
- In office June 1981 – June 1997
- Constituency: Sligo–Leitrim

Personal details
- Born: 24 November 1929 County Sligo, Ireland
- Died: 28 January 2014 (aged 84) County Sligo, Ireland
- Party: Fine Gael
- Spouse: Josephine Loughnane (m. 1967)
- Children: 2
- Education: St Nathy's College

Edward Nealon (24 November 1929 – 28 January 2014) was an Irish Fine Gael politician and journalist.

== Biography ==
He was born at Aclare, County Sligo in 1929, the younger of two sons of Ted and Una Nealon. Hie mother died when Ted was two years old and the boys were raised by their father. He attended St Nathy's College, Ballaghaderreen, County Mayo.

He was elected to Dáil Éireann as a Fine Gael Teachta Dála (TD) for Sligo–Leitrim at the 1981 general election, and was re-elected at each subsequent general election until he retired from politics at the 1997 general election. Previously he had stood for election in 1977 at Dublin Clontarf, but failed to be elected.

He served as Minister of State at the Department of Agriculture from 1981 to 1982 in the Fine Gael–Labour Party coalition government. After the November 1982 general election, another Fine Gael–Labour Party coalition government was formed in December under Taoiseach Garret FitzGerald. Nealon was appointed as Minister of State at the Department of the Taoiseach with responsibility for Arts and Culture, and in February 1983, he was appointed to the additional post of Minister of State at the Department of Posts and Telegraphs, with special responsibility for broadcasting. After the restructuring of government departments in January 1984, he was appointed Minister of State at the Department of Communications with special responsibility for radio and television.

He was the founder and editor of Nealon's Guide to the Dáil and Seanad from 1973 to 1997. This book comes out after every general election and is regarded as the 'bible' of political statistics and information. Since 1997 it has been edited by The Irish Times. In 2008, he published Tales from the Dáil bar, a collection of anecdotes featuring many of the characters of Irish politics.

Prior to going into politics, Nealon was a well-known current affairs presenter on RTÉ. He won a Jacob's Award for his hosting of the television coverage of the 1973 Irish general election results.

He died in January 2014.

Dáil	Election	Deputy (Party)	Deputy (Party)	Deputy (Party)	Deputy (Party)	Deputy (Party)
13th	1948	Eugene Gilbride (FF)	Stephen Flynn (FF)	Bernard Maguire (Ind.)	Mary Reynolds (FG)	Joseph Roddy (FG)
14th	1951	Eugene Gilbride (FF)	Stephen Flynn (FF)	Patrick Rogers (FG)	Mary Reynolds (FG)	Joseph Roddy (FG)
15th	1954	Eugene Gilbride (FF)	Stephen Flynn (FF)	Bernard Maguire (Ind.)	Mary Reynolds (FG)	Joseph Roddy (FG)
16th	1957	Eugene Gilbride (FF)	Stephen Flynn (FF)	John Joe McGirl (SF)	Mary Reynolds (FG)	Patrick Rogers (FG)
16th	1961 by-election	Eugene Gilbride (FF)	Joseph McLoughlin (FG)	John Joe McGirl (SF)	Mary Reynolds (FG)	Patrick Rogers (FG)
17th	1961	Eugene Gilbride (FF)	Joseph McLoughlin (FG)	James Gallagher (FF)	Eugene Gilhawley (FG)	4 seats 1961–1969
18th	1965	Eugene Gilbride (FF)	Joseph McLoughlin (FG)	James Gallagher (FF)	Eugene Gilhawley (FG)	4 seats 1961–1969
19th	1969	Ray MacSharry (FF)	Joseph McLoughlin (FG)	James Gallagher (FF)	3 seats 1969–1981	
20th	1973	Ray MacSharry (FF)	Joseph McLoughlin (FG)	Eugene Gilhawley (FG)	3 seats 1969–1981	
21st	1977	Ray MacSharry (FF)	James Gallagher (FF)	Eugene Gilhawley (FG)	3 seats 1969–1981	
22nd	1981	Ray MacSharry (FF)	John Ellis (FF)	Joe McCartin (FG)	Ted Nealon (FG)	4 seats 1981–2007
23rd	1982 (Feb)	Ray MacSharry (FF)	John Ellis (FF)	Matt Brennan (FF)	Ted Nealon (FG)	4 seats 1981–2007
24th	1982 (Nov)	Ray MacSharry (FF)	Joe McCartin (FG)	Matt Brennan (FF)	Ted Nealon (FG)	4 seats 1981–2007
25th	1987	Ray MacSharry (FF)	John Ellis (FF)	Matt Brennan (FF)	Ted Nealon (FG)	4 seats 1981–2007
26th	1989	Gerry Reynolds (FG)	John Ellis (FF)	Matt Brennan (FF)	Ted Nealon (FG)	4 seats 1981–2007
27th	1992	Declan Bree (Lab)	John Ellis (FF)	Matt Brennan (FF)	Ted Nealon (FG)	4 seats 1981–2007
28th	1997	Gerry Reynolds (FG)	John Ellis (FF)	Matt Brennan (FF)	John Perry (FG)	4 seats 1981–2007
29th	2002	Marian Harkin (Ind.)	John Ellis (FF)	Jimmy Devins (FF)	John Perry (FG)	4 seats 1981–2007
30th	2007	Constituency abolished. See Sligo–North Leitrim and Roscommon–South Leitrim				

Dáil	Election	Deputy (Party)	Deputy (Party)	Deputy (Party)	Deputy (Party)
32nd	2016	Martin Kenny (SF)	Marc MacSharry (FF)	Eamon Scanlon (FF)	Tony McLoughlin (FG)
33rd	2020	Martin Kenny (SF)	Marc MacSharry (FF)	Marian Harkin (Ind.)	Frank Feighan (FG)
34th	2024	Martin Kenny (SF)	Eamon Scanlon (FF)	Marian Harkin (Ind.)	Frank Feighan (FG)
