= Edward Collins (Irish politician) =

Irish politician (1941–2019)

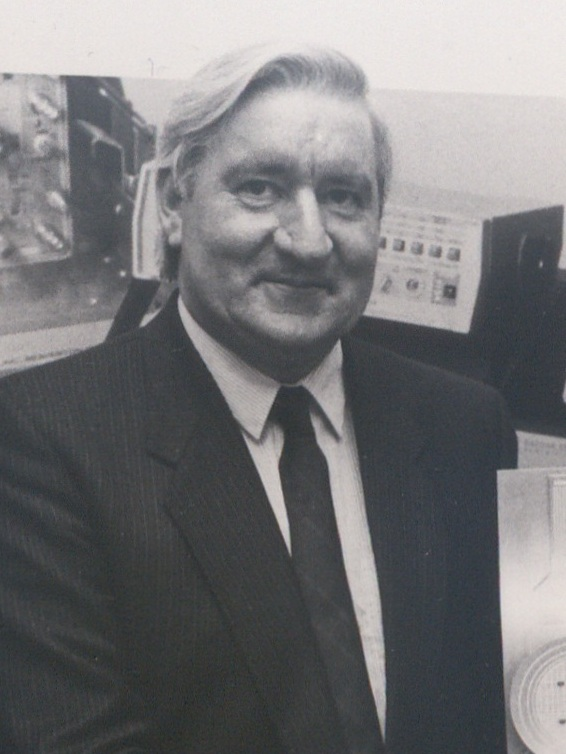
- Collins in 1985

Minister of State
- Feb.–Sep. 1986: Energy
- 1983–1986: Trade, Commerce and Tourism
- 1982–1983: Industry and Energy
- 1981–1982: Industry and Energy

Teachta Dála
- In office June 1969 – February 1987
- Constituency: Waterford

Personal details
- Born: 1 February 1941 County Waterford, Ireland
- Died: 4 March 2019 (aged 78) County Waterford, Ireland
- Party: Fine Gael

Edward Collins (1 February 1941 – 4 March 2019) was an Irish Fine Gael politician.

He first stood for election in the Waterford constituency at a by-election in 1966, but was unsuccessful. He was first elected to Dáil Éireann as a Fine Gael Teachta Dála (TD) for the Waterford constituency at the 1969 general election and was re-elected at each subsequent election until he was defeated at the 1987 general election.

He served as a Minister of State at the Department of Industry and Energy under the 1981–82 coalition and was reappointed after the second 1982 election. He moved to the position of Minister of State at the Department of Trade, Commerce and Tourism from 1983 until his dismissal in September 1986, after refusing the Taoiseach Garret FitzGerald's request to resign because of failure to disclose a conflict of interest. This related to his involvement with the Collins family's lamb processing businesses; he had stepped down as director of them upon appointment as junior minister, but an article by Fintan O'Toole in Magill revealed he subsequently attended a meeting discussing a loan application to Agricultural Credit Corporation, a state body. FitzGerald called Collins' action "inadverten[t] and clearly without any improper intent" and the dismissal his "most painful personal decision" as Taoiseach; some party colleagues felt FitzGerald was too fastidious about appearance of impropriety.

Collins died on 4 March 2019, aged 78.

Political offices
New office	Minister of State at the Department of Industry and Energy; 1981–1982	Succeeded by Jim Fitzsimons
Preceded by Jim Fitzsimons	Minister of State at the Department of Industry and Energy; 1982–1983	Office abolished
New office	Minister of State at the Department of Trade, Commerce and Tourism; 1983–1986	Office abolished
New office	Minister of State at the Department of Energy; Feb.–Sep. 1986	Succeeded by Richard Bruton

Dáil	Election	Deputy (Party)	Deputy (Party)	Deputy (Party)	Deputy (Party)
4th	1923	Caitlín Brugha (Rep)	John Butler (Lab)	Nicholas Wall (FP)	William Redmond (NL)
5th	1927 (Jun)	Caitlín Brugha (Rep)	Patrick Little (FF)	Vincent White (CnaG)	William Redmond (NL)
6th	1927 (Sep)	Seán Goulding (FF)	Patrick Little (FF)	Vincent White (CnaG)	William Redmond (NL)
7th	1932	Seán Goulding (FF)	Patrick Little (FF)	John Kiersey (CnaG)	William Redmond (CnaG)
8th	1933	Seán Goulding (FF)	Patrick Little (FF)	Nicholas Wall (NCP)	Bridget Redmond (CnaG)
9th	1937	Michael Morrissey (FF)	Patrick Little (FF)	Nicholas Wall (FG)	Bridget Redmond (FG)
10th	1938	Michael Morrissey (FF)	Patrick Little (FF)	William Broderick (FG)	Bridget Redmond (FG)
11th	1943	Michael Morrissey (FF)	Patrick Little (FF)	Denis Heskin (CnaT)	Bridget Redmond (FG)
12th	1944	Michael Morrissey (FF)	Patrick Little (FF)	Denis Heskin (CnaT)	Bridget Redmond (FG)
12th	1947 by-election	John Ormonde (FF)	Patrick Little (FF)	Denis Heskin (CnaT)	Bridget Redmond (FG)
13th	1948	John Ormonde (FF)	Patrick Little (FF)	Thomas Kyne (Lab)	Bridget Redmond (FG)
14th	1951	John Ormonde (FF)	Patrick Little (FF)	Thomas Kyne (Lab)	Bridget Redmond (FG)
14th	1952 by-election	John Ormonde (FF)	Patrick Little (FF)	Thomas Kyne (Lab)	William Kenneally (FF)
15th	1954	John Ormonde (FF)	Thaddeus Lynch (FG)	Thomas Kyne (Lab)	William Kenneally (FF)
16th	1957	John Ormonde (FF)	Thaddeus Lynch (FG)	Thomas Kyne (Lab)	William Kenneally (FF)
17th	1961	John Ormonde (FF)	Thaddeus Lynch (FG)	Thomas Kyne (Lab)	3 seats 1961–1977
18th	1965	Billy Kenneally (FF)	Thaddeus Lynch (FG)	Thomas Kyne (Lab)	3 seats 1961–1977
18th	1966 by-election	Billy Kenneally (FF)	Fad Browne (FF)	Thomas Kyne (Lab)	3 seats 1961–1977
19th	1969	Billy Kenneally (FF)	Fad Browne (FF)	Edward Collins (FG)	3 seats 1961–1977
20th	1973	Billy Kenneally (FF)	Thomas Kyne (Lab)	Edward Collins (FG)	3 seats 1961–1977
21st	1977	Billy Kenneally (FF)	Jackie Fahey (FF)	Edward Collins (FG)	Austin Deasy (FG)
22nd	1981	Billy Kenneally (FF)	Jackie Fahey (FF)	Edward Collins (FG)	Austin Deasy (FG)
23rd	1982 (Feb)	Paddy Gallagher (SF–WP)	Jackie Fahey (FF)	Edward Collins (FG)	Austin Deasy (FG)
24th	1982 (Nov)	Donal Ormonde (FF)	Jackie Fahey (FF)	Edward Collins (FG)	Austin Deasy (FG)
25th	1987	Martin Cullen (PDs)	Jackie Fahey (FF)	Brian Swift (FF)	Austin Deasy (FG)
26th	1989	Brian O'Shea (Lab)	Jackie Fahey (FF)	Brendan Kenneally (FF)	Austin Deasy (FG)
27th	1992	Brian O'Shea (Lab)	Martin Cullen (PDs)	Brendan Kenneally (FF)	Austin Deasy (FG)
28th	1997	Brian O'Shea (Lab)	Martin Cullen (FF)	Brendan Kenneally (FF)	Austin Deasy (FG)
29th	2002	Brian O'Shea (Lab)	Martin Cullen (FF)	Ollie Wilkinson (FF)	John Deasy (FG)
30th	2007	Brian O'Shea (Lab)	Martin Cullen (FF)	Brendan Kenneally (FF)	John Deasy (FG)
31st	2011	Ciara Conway (Lab)	John Halligan (Ind.)	Paudie Coffey (FG)	John Deasy (FG)
32nd	2016	David Cullinane (SF)	John Halligan (Ind.)	Mary Butler (FF)	John Deasy (FG)
33rd	2020	David Cullinane (SF)	Marc Ó Cathasaigh (GP)	Mary Butler (FF)	Matt Shanahan (Ind.)
34th	2024	David Cullinane (SF)	Conor D. McGuinness (SF)	Mary Butler (FF)	John Cummins (FG)
