= Minister for Culture, Communications and Sport =

Irish government cabinet minister

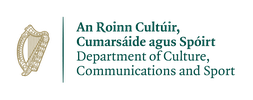

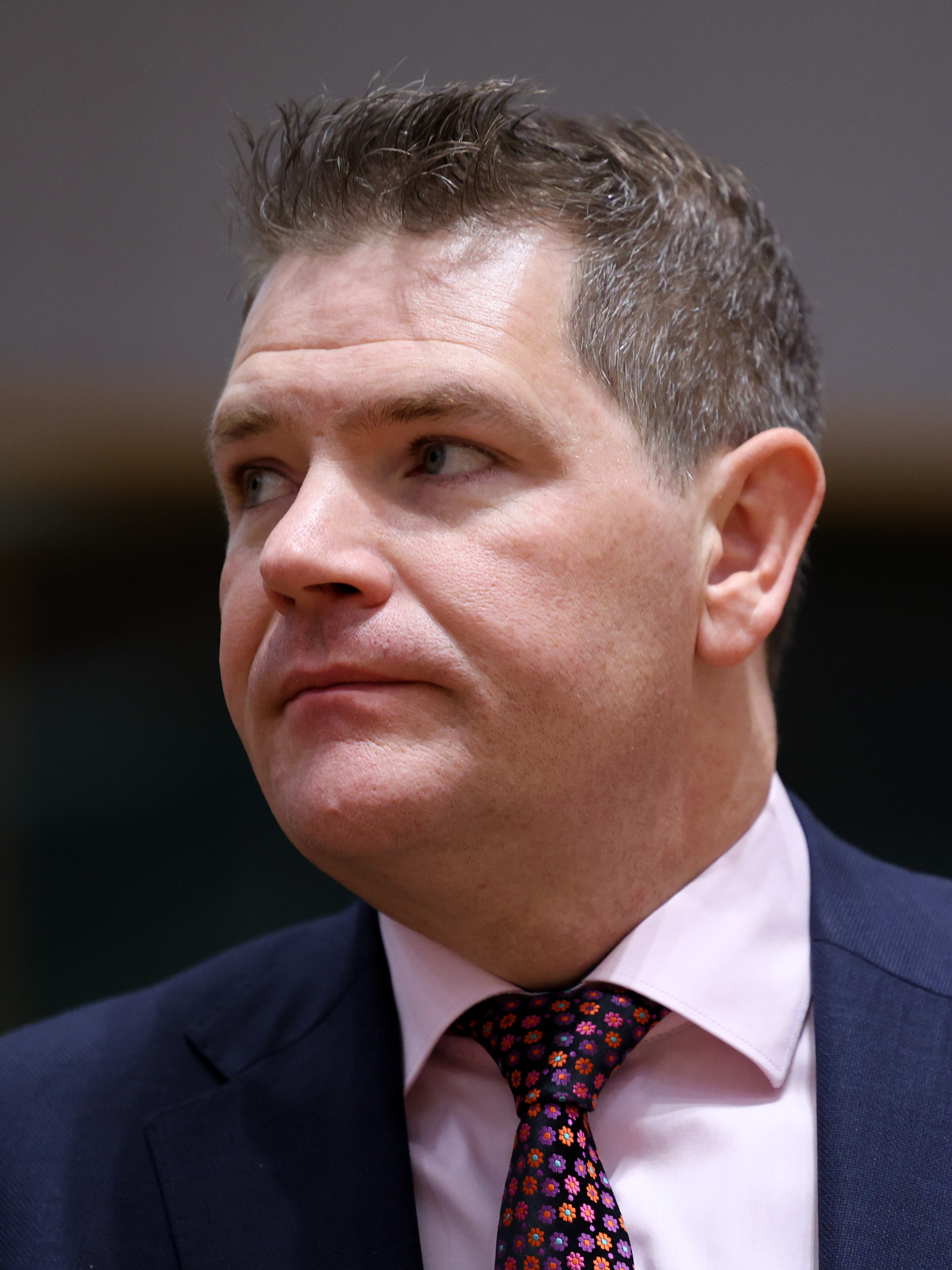
- Incumbent; Peter Burke since 2 November 2026
- Department of Culture, Communications and Sport
- Type: Culture minister; Sports minister
- Status: Cabinet minister
- Member of: Government of Ireland; Council of the European Union; North/South Ministerial Council; Dáil Éireann
- Reports to: Taoiseach
- Seat: Dublin, Ireland
- Nominator: Taoiseach
- Appointer: President of Ireland; (on the advice of the Taoiseach)
- Inaugural holder: Martin O'Donoghue as Minister for Economic Planning and Development
- Formation: 8 July 1977
- Salary: €210,750 (2025) (including €115,953 TD salary)
- Website: Official website

The minister for culture, communications and sport (Irish: An tAire Cultúir, Cumarsáide agus Spóirt) is a senior minister in the Government of Ireland and leads the Department of Culture, Communications and Sport.

The minister since November 2026 is Peter Burke, TD. He is assisted by one minister of state:

- Charlie McConalogue, TD – Minister of State for sport and postal policy

== List of office-holders ==
The minister for economic planning and development was created by the Ministers and Secretaries (Amendment) Act 1977. The title and functions of the position have changed several times since then.

=== Minister for Economic Planning and Development 1977–1980 ===
Name	Term of office		Party	Government(s)
Martin O'Donoghue (Note: O'Donoghue was a minister without portfolio from 8 July to 13 December 1977 before the department was formally established.)	8 July 1977	11 December 1979	Fianna Fáil	15th
Michael O'Kennedy	12 December 1979	21 January 1980	Fianna Fáil	16th
=== Minister for Energy 1980–1981 ===
Name	Term of office		Party	Government(s)
Michael O'Kennedy	21 January 1980	22 January 1980	Fianna Fáil	16th
George Colley	22 January 1980	30 June 1981	Fianna Fáil	16th
=== Minister for Industry and Energy 1981–1983 ===
Name	Term of office		Party	Government(s)
Michael O'Leary	30 June 1981	9 March 1982	Labour	17th
Albert Reynolds (1st time)	9 March 1982	14 December 1982	Fianna Fáil	18th
John Bruton	14 December 1982	13 December 1983	Fine Gael	19th
=== Minister for Energy 1983–1993 ===
Name	Term of office		Party	Government(s)
Dick Spring	13 December 1983	20 January 1987	Labour	19th
Michael Noonan	20 January 1987	10 March 1987	Fine Gael	19th
Ray Burke	10 March 1987	24 November 1988	Fianna Fáil	20th
Michael Smith	24 November 1988	12 July 1989	Fianna Fáil	20th
Bobby Molloy	12 July 1989	4 November 1992	Progressive Democrats	21st • 22nd
Albert Reynolds (2nd time)	4 November 1992	12 January 1993	Fianna Fáil	22nd
Brian Cowen	12 January 1993	20 January 1993	Fianna Fáil	23rd
=== Minister for Tourism and Trade 1993–1997 ===
Name	Term of office		Party	Government(s)
Brian Cowen	20 January 1993	22 January 1993	Fianna Fáil	23rd
Charlie McCreevy	22 January 1993	15 December 1994	Fianna Fáil	23rd
Enda Kenny	15 December 1994	26 June 1997	Fine Gael	24th
=== Minister for Tourism, Sport and Recreation 1997–2002 ===
Name	Term of office		Party	Government(s)
Jim McDaid	26 June 1997	6 June 2002	Fianna Fáil	25th
=== Minister for Arts, Sport and Tourism 2002–2010 ===
Name	Term of office		Party	Government(s)
John O'Donoghue	6 June 2002	14 June 2007	Fianna Fáil	26th
Séamus Brennan	14 June 2007	7 May 2008	Fianna Fáil	27th
Martin Cullen	7 May 2008	23 March 2010	Fianna Fáil	28th
=== Minister for Tourism, Culture and Sport 2010–2011 ===
Name	Term of office		Party	Government(s)
Mary Hanafin	23 March 2010	9 March 2011	Fianna Fáil	28th
=== Minister for Arts, Heritage and the Gaeltacht 2011–2016 ===
Name	Term of office		Party	Government(s)
Jimmy Deenihan	9 March 2011	11 July 2014	Fine Gael	29th
Heather Humphreys	11 July 2014	6 May 2016	Fine Gael	29th
=== Minister for Arts, Heritage, Regional, Rural and Gaeltacht Affairs 2016–2017 ===
Name	Term of office		Party	Government(s)
Heather Humphreys	6 May 2016	14 June 2017	Fine Gael	30th
=== Minister for Culture, Heritage and the Gaeltacht 2017–2020 ===
Name	Term of office		Party	Government(s)
Heather Humphreys	14 June 2017	30 November 2017	Fine Gael	31st
Josepha Madigan	30 November 2017	27 June 2020	Fine Gael	31st
=== Minister for Tourism, Culture, Arts, Gaeltacht, Sport and Media 2020–2025 ===
Name	Term of office		Party	Government(s)
Catherine Martin	27 June 2020	23 January 2025	Green	32nd • 33rd • 34th
=== Minister for Culture, Communications and Sport 2025–present ===
Name	Term of office		Party	Government(s)
Patrick O'Donovan	23 January 2025	2 November 2026	Fine Gael	35th
Peter Burke	2 November 2026	Incumbent	Fine Gael	35th
