= Government of the Dáil =

Government of the Dáil may refer to

- Government of the 1st Dáil
- Government of the 2nd Dáil
- Government of the 3rd Dáil
- Government of the 4th Dáil
- Government of the 5th Dáil
- Government of the 6th Dáil
- Government of the 7th Dáil
- Government of the 8th Dáil
- Government of the 9th Dáil
- Government of the 10th Dáil
- Government of the 11th Dáil
- Government of the 12th Dáil
- Government of the 13th Dáil
- Government of the 14th Dáil
- Government of the 15th Dáil
- Government of the 16th Dáil
- Government of the 17th Dáil
- Government of the 18th Dáil
- Government of the 19th Dáil
- Government of the 20th Dáil
- Government of the 21st Dáil
- Government of the 22nd Dáil
- Government of the 23rd Dáil
- Government of the 24th Dáil
- Government of the 25th Dáil
- Government of the 26th Dáil
- Two government of the 27th Dáil:
  - 23rd government of Ireland
  - 24th government of Ireland
- Government of the 28th Dáil
- Government of the 29th Dáil
- Government of the 30th Dáil
- Government of the 31st Dáil
