= Government of the 10th Dáil =

Government of Ireland 1938 to 1943

2nd government of Ireland
- Government of Ireland

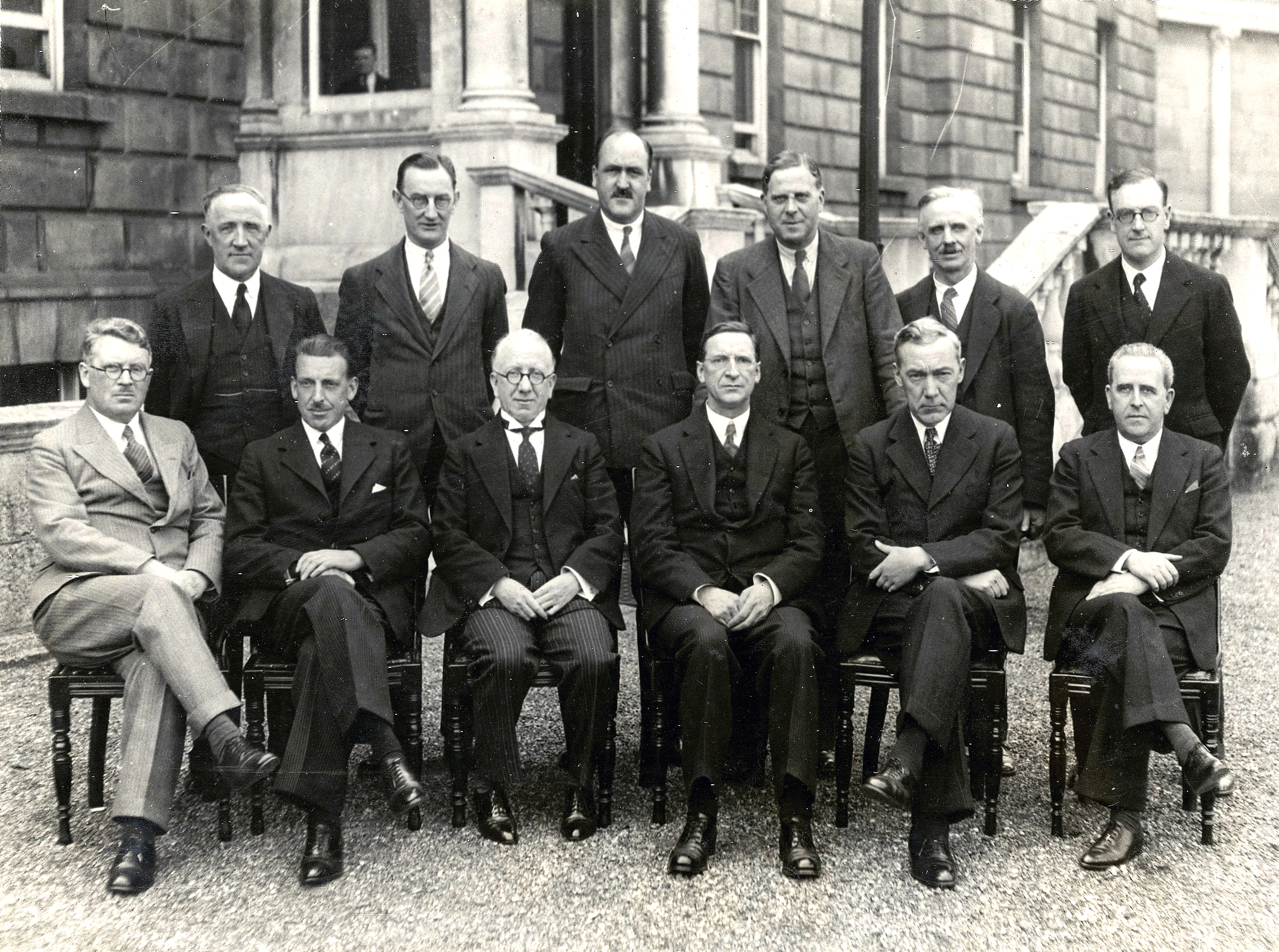
- Cabinet portrait, early 1940s
- Date formed: 30 June 1938
- Date dissolved: 1 July 1943

People and organisations
- President: Douglas Hyde
- Taoiseach: Éamon de Valera
- Tánaiste: Seán T. O'Kelly
- Total no. of members: 10 (1938–1939); 12 (1939–1943)
- Member party: Fianna Fáil
- Status in legislature: Majority government 77 / 138 (56%)
- Opposition party: Fine Gael
- Opposition leader: W. T. Cosgrave

History
- Election: 1938 general election
- Legislature terms: 10th Dáil; 3rd Seanad
- Predecessor: 1st government
- Successor: 3rd government

The 2nd government of Ireland (30 June 1938 – 1 July 1943) was the government of Ireland formed after the 1938 general election to the 10th Dáil held on 17 June. It was a single-party Fianna Fáil government led by Éamon de Valera as Taoiseach. Fianna Fáil had been in office since the 1932 general election. It lasted for 5 years, 1 day.

== Nomination of Taoiseach ==
The 10th Dáil first met on 30 June 1938. In the debate on the nomination of Taoiseach, Fianna Fáil leader and outgoing Taoiseach Éamon de Valera was proposed. The motion was approved by 75 to 45. De Valera was appointed as Taoiseach by President Douglas Hyde. This occurred five days after the inauguration of Hyde as the first President of Ireland on 25 June.

30 June 1938; Nomination of Éamon de Valera (FF) as Taoiseach; Motion proposed by Gerald Bartley and seconded by Bernard Maguire; Absolute majority: 70/138
Vote	Parties	Votes
Yes	Fianna Fáil (74), Independent (1)	75 / 138
No	Fine Gael (44), Independent (1)	45 / 138
Absent or Not voting	Labour Party (9), Fianna Fáil (2), Fine Gael (1), Independents (5), Ceann Comhairle (1)	19 / 138

== Members of the government ==
After his appointment as Taoiseach by the president, Éamon de Valera proposed the members of the government and they were approved by the Dáil. They were appointed to office by the president.

Office	Name	Term
Taoiseach	Éamon de Valera	1938–1943
Minister for External Affairs	Éamon de Valera	1938–1943
Tánaiste	Seán T. O'Kelly	1938–1943
Minister for Local Government and Public Health	Seán T. O'Kelly	1938–1939
Minister for Justice	P. J. Ruttledge	1938–1939
Minister for Industry and Commerce	Seán Lemass	1938–1939
Minister for Finance	Seán MacEntee	1938–1939
Minister for Agriculture	James Ryan	1938–1943
Minister for Defence	Frank Aiken	1938–1939
Minister for Education	Thomas Derrig	1938–1939
Minister for Lands	Gerald Boland	1938–1939
Minister for Posts and Telegraphs	Oscar Traynor	1938–1939
=== Changes 8 September 1939 === Re-organisation on declaration of The Emergency.
Office	Name	Term
Minister for Education	Seán T. O'Kelly	(acting)
Minister for Local Government and Public Health	P. J. Ruttledge	1939–1941
Minister for Supplies	Seán Lemass	1939–1943
Minister for the Co-ordination of Defensive Measures	Frank Aiken	1939–1943
Minister for Lands	Thomas Derrig	1939–1943
Minister for Posts and Telegraphs	Thomas Derrig	(acting)
Minister for Justice	Gerald Boland	1939–1943
Minister for Defence	Oscar Traynor	1939–1943
=== Changes 16 September 1939 ===
Office	Name	Term
Minister for Finance	Seán T. O'Kelly	1939–1943
Minister for Industry and Commerce	Seán MacEntee	1939–1941
=== Changes 27 September 1939 === Appointment of new member of government.
Office	Name	Term
Minister for Education	Éamon de Valera	(acting)
Minister for Posts and Telegraphs	Patrick Little	1939–1943
=== Changes 18 June 1940 ===
Office	Name	Term
Minister for Education	Thomas Derrig	1940–1943
=== Changes 15 August 1941 ===
Office	Name	Term
Minister for Local Government and Public Health	Éamon de Valera	(acting)
=== Changes 18 August 1941 ===
Office	Name	Term
Minister for Industry and Commerce	Seán Lemass	1941–1943
Minister for Local Government and Public Health	Seán MacEntee	1941–1943

== Parliamentary secretaries ==
On 30 June 1938, the Government appointed Parliamentary secretaries on the nomination of the Taoiseach.

Name	Office	Term
Patrick Little	Government Chief Whip	1938–1939
Patrick Little	Parliamentary secretary to the Minister for External Affairs	1938–1939
Hugo Flinn	Parliamentary secretary to the Minister for Finance	1938–Jan 1943
Conn Ward	Parliamentary secretary to the Minister for Local Government and Public Health	1938–1943
Seán O'Grady	Parliamentary secretary to the Minister for Defence	1938–1939
Seán Moylan	Parliamentary secretary to the Minister for Industry and Commerce	1938–Feb 1943
=== Changes 27 September 1939 === Changes following the appointment of Patrick Little as Minister for Posts and Telegraphs.
Name	Office	Term
Paddy Smith	Government Chief Whip	1939–1943
Paddy Smith	Parliamentary secretary to the Minister for External Affairs	1939–1943
Seán Moylan	Parliamentary secretary to the Minister for Defence	1939–1943
=== Changes 12 September 1941 ===
Name	Office	Term
Seán O'Grady	Parliamentary secretary to the Minister for Lands	1941–Feb 1943
Hugo Flinn	Parliamentary secretary to the Minister for Local Government and Public Health	1941–Jan 1943
=== Changes 9 February 1943 === Changes following the death of Hugo Flinn.
Name	Office	Term
Seán Moylan	Parliamentary secretary to the Minister for Finance	Feb–Jun 1943
Seán O'Grady	Parliamentary secretary to the Minister for Industry and Commerce	Feb–Jun 1943
Eamon Kissane	Parliamentary secretary to the Minister for Lands	Feb–Jun 1943

== Constitutional amendments ==
During the first three years of the term of office of the first President of Ireland, the Oireachtas could pass amendments to the Constitution of Ireland without a referendum. This period lasted from 25 June 1938 to 24 June 1941. The First Amendment of the Constitution of Ireland was introduced and signed into law on 2 September 1939, allowing the Oireachtas to resolve that a state of emergency exists when an armed conflict exists outside of the state. The Emergency was declared on the same day, and the emergency powers lapsed on 2 September 1946. The Second Amendment of the Constitution of Ireland was signed into law on 30 May 1941 and was an omnibus amendment with 40 separate changes across the text of the Constitution. Both amendments were proposed by the Taoiseach.
