= Government of the 9th Dáil =

Government of Ireland from 1937 to 1938

The government of the 9th Dáil was successively the 8th Executive Council of the Irish Free State (21 July – 29 December 1937) and the 1st government of Ireland (29 December 1937 – 30 June 1938). They were led by Éamon de Valera, first as President of the Executive Council and then as Taoiseach. It was formed after the 1937 general election held on 1 July, the same day the new Constitution of Ireland was approved in a plebiscite. Fianna Fáil were continuing in office as a single-party government as they had since the 1932 general election. The 8th Executive Council lasted for 161 days until the coming into operation of the new constitution and the 1st Government lasted for 183 days.

== 8th executive council of the Irish Free State ==
8th executive council of the Irish Free State
- Executive Council of the Irish Free State
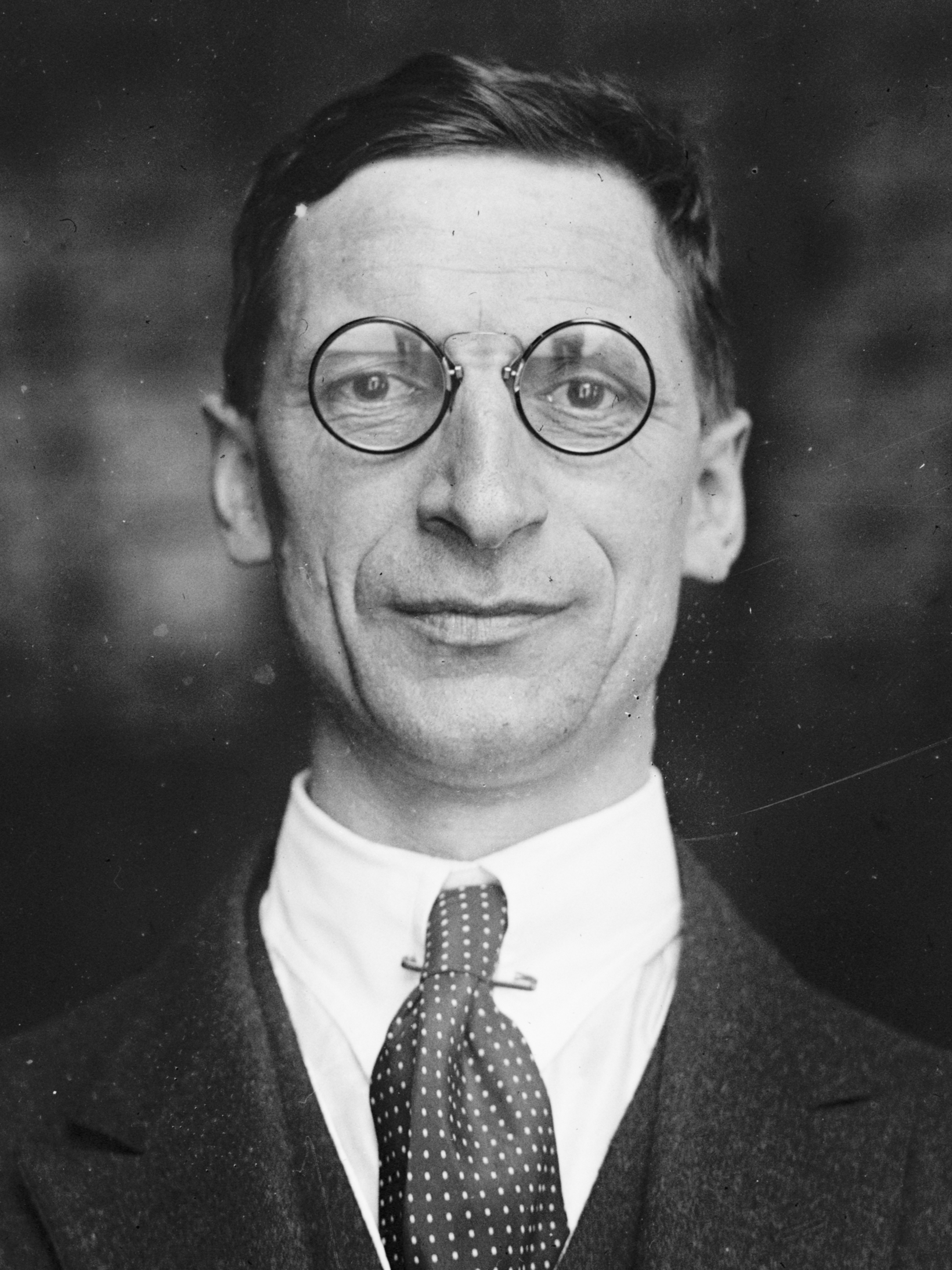
- Date formed: 21 July 1937
- Date dissolved: 29 December 1937

People and organisations
- President of the Executive Council: Éamon de Valera
- Vice-President of the Executive Council: Seán T. O'Kelly
- Total no. of members: 10
- Member party: Fianna Fáil
- Status in legislature: Minority with Labour support 69 / 138 (50%)
- Opposition party: Fine Gael
- Opposition leader: W. T. Cosgrave

History
- Election: 1937 general election
- Legislature term: 9th Dáil
- Predecessor: 7th Executive Council
- Successor: 1st government

=== Election of President of the Executive Council ===
The 9th Dáil first met on 21 July 1937. In the debate on the election of the President of the Executive Council, Fianna Fáil leader and outgoing President Éamon de Valera was proposed, and the motion was approved by 82 votes to 52.

The election took place under Article 53 of the Constitution of the Irish Free State, as amended by the Constitution (Amendment No. 27) Act 1936, which had removed the constitutional role of the Governor-General. It was the only time from December 1922 that the head of government was directly elected by the Dáil only; from December 1922 to December 1936, the nomination of the president of the Executive Council was approved by Dáil for appointment by the Governor-General, and since December 1937, the nomination of the Taoiseach has similarly been approved by the Dáil for appointment by the president of Ireland.

21 July 1937; Election of Éamon de Valera (FF) as President of the Executive Council; Motion proposed by Richard Walsh and seconded by Tom McEllistrim; Absolute majority: 70/138
| Vote | Parties | Votes |
| Yes | Fianna Fáil (67), Labour Party (13), Independents (2) | 82 / 138 |
| No | Fine Gael (48), Independents (4) | 52 / 138 |
| Absent or Not voting | Independents (2), Fianna Fáil (1), Ceann Comhairle (1) | 4 / 138 |

=== Members of the Executive Council ===
The members of the Executive Council were proposed by the President after his election and approved by the Dáil for their appointment by him.

| Office | Name |
|---|---|
| President of the Executive Council | Éamon de Valera |
| Minister for External Affairs | Éamon de Valera |
| Vice-President of the Executive Council | Seán T. O'Kelly |
| Minister for Local Government and Public Health | Seán T. O'Kelly |
| Minister for Justice | P. J. Ruttledge |
| Minister for Industry and Commerce | Seán Lemass |
| Minister for Finance | Seán MacEntee |
| Minister for Agriculture | James Ryan |
| Minister for Defence | Frank Aiken |
| Minister for Education | Thomas Derrig |
| Minister for Lands | Gerald Boland |
| Minister for Posts and Telegraphs | Oscar Traynor |

=== Parliamentary secretaries ===
On 21 July, the Executive Council appointed Parliamentary secretaries on the nomination of the President.

| Name | Office |
|---|---|
| Patrick Little | Government Chief Whip |
| Patrick Little | Parliamentary secretary to the Minister for External Affairs |
| Hugo Flinn | Parliamentary secretary to the Minister for Finance |
| Conn Ward | Parliamentary secretary to the Minister for Local Government and Public Health |
| Seán O'Grady | Parliamentary secretary to the Minister for Lands |
| Seán O'Grady | Parliamentary secretary to the Minister for Defence |
| Seán Moylan | Parliamentary secretary to the Minister for Industry and Commerce |

== 1st government of Ireland ==
1st government of Ireland
- Government of Ireland

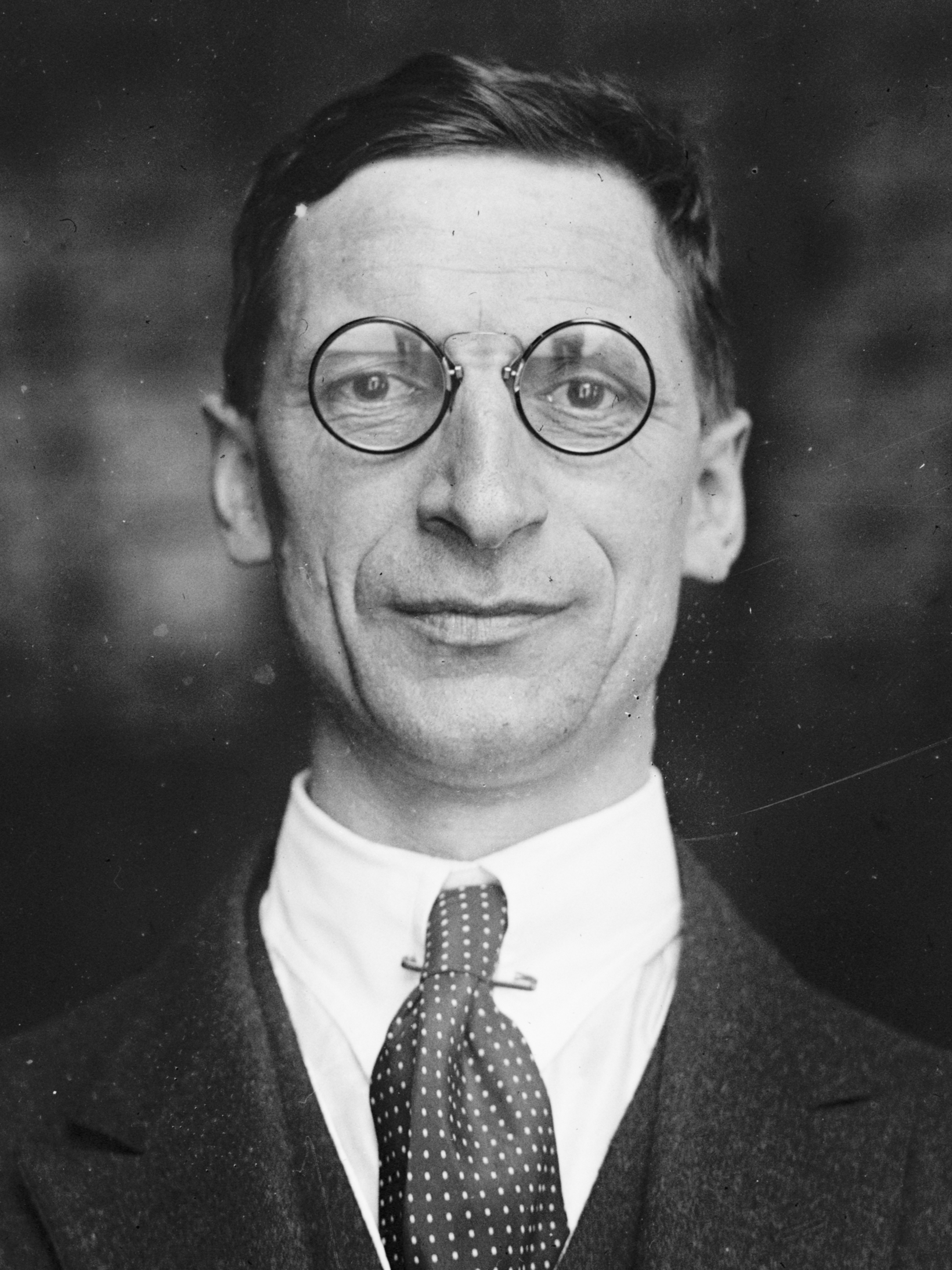
- Date formed: 29 December 1937
- Date dissolved: 30 June 1938

People and organisations
- President: Presidential Commission (Dec. 1937 – June 1938); Douglas Hyde (June 1938)
- Taoiseach: Éamon de Valera
- Tánaiste: Seán T. O'Kelly
- Total no. of members: 10
- Member party: Fianna Fáil
- Status in legislature: Minority with Labour support 69 / 138 (50%)
- Opposition party: Fine Gael
- Opposition leader: W. T. Cosgrave

History
- Legislature terms: 9th Dáil; 2nd Seanad
- Predecessor: 8th executive council
- Successor: 2nd government

Under Article 56 of the Constitution of Ireland, the 8th Executive Council of the Irish Free State led by Éamon de Valera of Fianna Fáil became the 1st Government of Ireland (29 December 1937 – 30 June 1938), with greatly expanded powers. Notably, it was now the de jure and de facto executive authority. The Free State Constitution vested executive power in the King represented by the Governor-General, but convention bound them in almost all cases to act on the advice of the Executive Council.

The offices of President of the Executive Council and Vice-President of the Executive Council were replaced by the offices of Taoiseach and Tánaiste respectively. There was no fresh approval or appointment of the government and no change in the personnel of the Government.

| Office | Name |
|---|---|
| Taoiseach | Éamon de Valera |
| Minister for External Affairs | Éamon de Valera |
| Tánaiste | Seán T. O'Kelly |
| Minister for Local Government and Public Health | Seán T. O'Kelly |
| Minister for Justice | P. J. Ruttledge |
| Minister for Industry and Commerce | Seán Lemass |
| Minister for Finance | Seán MacEntee |
| Minister for Agriculture | James Ryan |
| Minister for Defence | Frank Aiken |
| Minister for Education | Thomas Derrig |
| Minister for Lands | Gerald Boland |
| Minister for Posts and Telegraphs | Oscar Traynor |

=== Parliamentary secretaries ===
| Name | Office |
|---|---|
| Patrick Little | Government Chief Whip |
| Patrick Little | Parliamentary secretary to the Minister for External Affairs |
| Hugo Flinn | Parliamentary secretary to the Minister for Finance |
| Conn Ward | Parliamentary secretary to the Minister for Local Government and Public Health |
| Seán O'Grady | Parliamentary secretary to the Minister for Lands |
| Seán O'Grady | Parliamentary secretary to the Minister for Defence |
| Seán Moylan | Parliamentary secretary to the Minister for Industry and Commerce |

=== Foreign relations ===
The government signed the Anglo-Irish Trade Agreement with the United Kingdom on 25 April 1938, which brought the Anglo-Irish trade war to a close and transferred the Treaty Ports to Ireland. These were the ports of Berehaven, Cóbh and Lough Swilly which had stayed under the control of the United Kingdom after the establishment of the Irish Free State.
