= Moylon =

Moylon is a surname. Notable people with the surname include:

- Bill Moylon (1915-2014), British soldier and Chelsea Pensioner
- Seán Moylan (1888–1957), Commandant of the Irish Republican Army and later a Sinn Féin and Fianna Fáil politician
