= Minister of State at the Department of Defence =

List of Irish Ministers of State

The minister of state at the Department of Defence (Irish: Aire Stáit ag an Roinn Cosanta) is a junior ministerial post in the Department of Defence of the Government of Ireland who performs duties and functions delegated by the minister for defence. Although the position has often been held jointly with that of the post of Minister of State at the Department of the Taoiseach with responsibility as Government Chief Whip, which entitles the office-holder to regularly attend meetings of cabinet, the position of minister of state does not itself hold cabinet rank.

The title was first used on 1 January 1978, replacing the position of parliamentary secretary to the minister of defence. The minister of state at the Department of Defence is a member of the Council of Defence.

The current minister of state is Thomas Byrne, TD, who was appointed in January 2025. Byrne is also Minister of State for European Affairs.

== List of parliamentary secretaries, 1924–1978 ==
Name	Term of office		Party	Government
George Nicolls	15 January 1925	23 May 1927	Cumann na nGaedheal	2nd EC
Eamonn Duggan	24 June 1927	9 March 1932	Cumann na nGaedheal	3rd EC • 4th EC • 5th EC
Gerald Boland	9 March 1932	7 February 1933	Fianna Fáil	6th EC
Seán O'Grady	8 February 1933	3 June 1936	Fianna Fáil	7th EC
Oscar Traynor	3 June 1936	10 November 1936	Fianna Fáil	7th EC
Seán O'Grady	11 November 1936	8 September 1939	Fianna Fáil	7th EC • 1st • 2nd
Seán Moylan	8 September 1939	2 July 1943	Fianna Fáil	2nd
Eamon Kissane	2 July 1943	18 February 1948	Fianna Fáil	3rd • 4th
Brendan Corish	18 February 1948	7 May 1951	Labour	5th
Donnchadh Ó Briain	13 June 1951	24 April 1954	Fianna Fáil	6th
Denis J. O'Sullivan	2 June 1954	12 February 1957	Fine Gael	7th
Donnchadh Ó Briain	20 March 1957	11 October 1961	Fianna Fáil	8th • 9th
Joseph Brennan	11 October 1961	18 March 1965	Fianna Fáil	10th
Michael Carty	21 April 1965	22 May 1969	Fianna Fáil	11th • 12th
Desmond O'Malley	2 July 1969	7 May 1970	Fianna Fáil	13th
David Andrews	8 May 1970	5 February 1973	Fianna Fáil	13th
John M. Kelly	14 March 1973	19 May 1977	Fine Gael	14th
Patrick Lalor	5 July 1977	1 January 1978	Fianna Fáil	15th

== List of ministers of state, 1978–present ==
Name	Term of office		Party	Government
Patrick Lalor	1 January 1978	1 July 1979	Fianna Fáil	15th
Michael Woods	1 July 1979	11 December 1979	Fianna Fáil	15th
Seán Moore	13 December 1979	30 June 1981	Fianna Fáil	16th
Gerry L'Estrange	30 June 1981	11 November 1981	Fine Gael	17th
Fergus O'Brien	11 November 1981	9 March 1982	Fine Gael	17th
Bertie Ahern	9 March 1982	14 December 1982	Fianna Fáil	18th
Seán Barrett	14 December 1982	13 February 1986	Fine Gael	19th
Fergus O'Brien	13 February 1986	10 March 1987	Fine Gael	19th
Vincent Brady	10 March 1987	14 November 1991	Fianna Fáil	20th • 21st
Dermot Ahern	15 November 1991	11 February 1992	Fianna Fáil	21st
Noel Dempsey	11 February 1992	15 December 1994	Fianna Fáil	22nd • 23rd
Seán Barrett	15 December 1994	23 May 1995	Fine Gael	24th
Jim Higgins	24 May 1995	26 June 1997	Fine Gael	24th
Séamus Brennan	26 June 1997	6 June 2002	Fianna Fáil	25th
Mary Hanafin	6 June 2002	29 September 2004	Fianna Fáil	26th
Tom Kitt	29 September 2004	7 May 2008	Fianna Fáil	26th • 27th
Pat Carey	7 May 2008	23 March 2010	Fianna Fáil	28th
John Curran	23 March 2010	9 March 2011	Fianna Fáil	28th
Paul Kehoe	9 March 2011	27 June 2020	Fine Gael	29th • 30th • 31st
Jack Chambers	17 November 2020	17 December 2022	Fianna Fáil	32nd
Peter Burke	21 December 2022	9 April 2024	Fine Gael	33rd
Jennifer Carroll MacNeill	9 April 2024	23 January 2025	Fine Gael	34th
Thomas Byrne	29 January 2025	Incumbent	Fianna Fáil	35th
