= Government of the 16th Dáil =

Irish Governments from 1957 to 1961

There were two governments of the 16th Dáil, which was elected at the 1957 general election held on 5 March. The outgoing minority coalition government of Fine Gael, the Labour Party and Clann na Talmhan had failed to be returned. The 8th government of Ireland (20 March 1957 – 23 June 1959) was led by Éamon de Valera as Taoiseach, until his election as president of Ireland at the 1959 election. It lasted for 2 years, 89 days from its appointment until de Valera's resignation on 17 June 1959, and continued to carry out its duties for a further 6 days until the appointment of its successor, giving a total of 2 years, 95 days. The 9th government of Ireland (23 June 1959 – 11 November 1961) was led by Seán Lemass as Taoiseach and lasted for 2 years, 141 days. Both were single-party Fianna Fáil governments.

== 8th government of Ireland ==
8th government of Ireland
- Government of Ireland

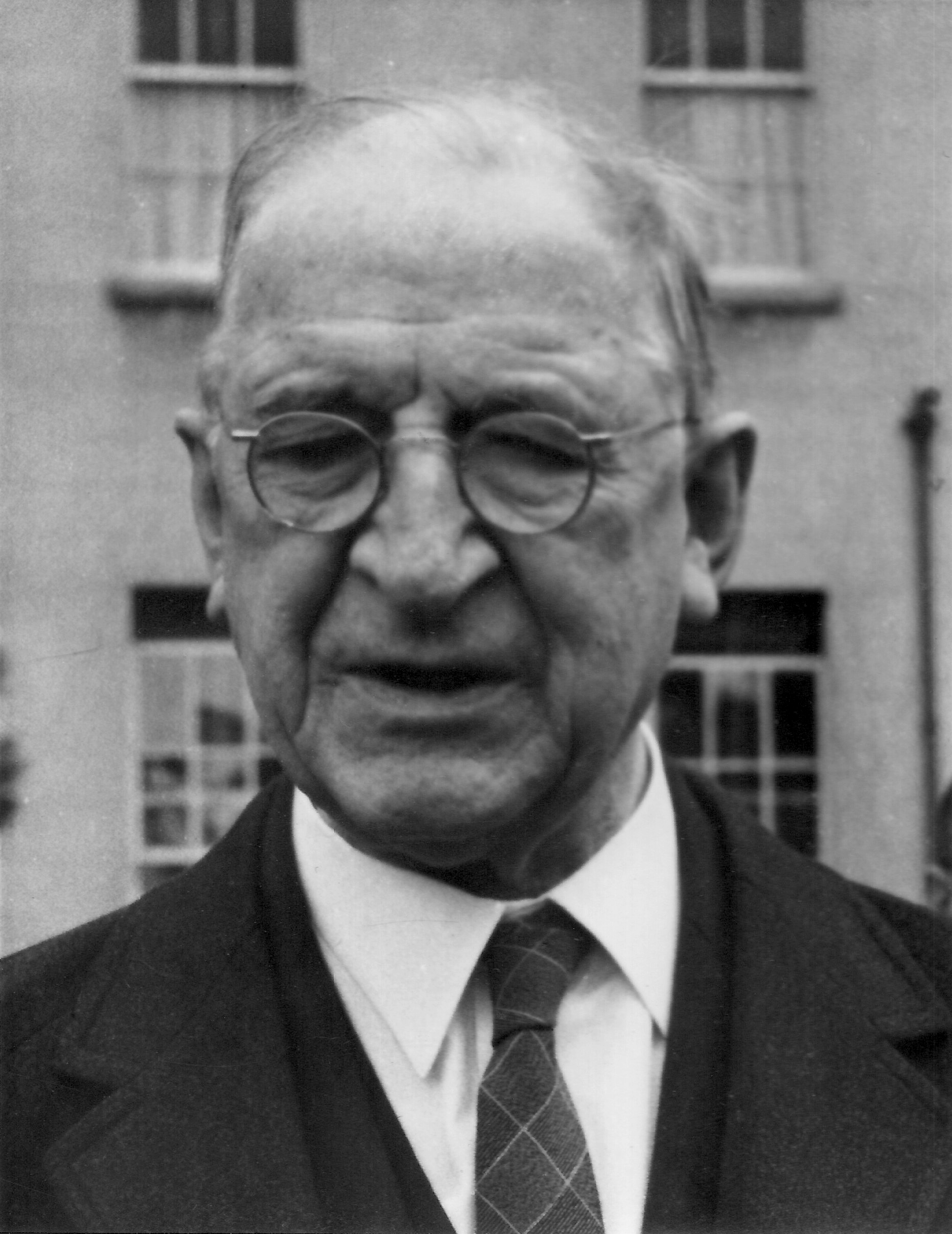
- Date formed: 20 March 1957
- Date dissolved: 23 June 1959

People and organisations
- President: Seán T. O'Kelly
- Taoiseach: Éamon de Valera
- Tánaiste: Seán Lemass
- Total no. of members: 13
- Member party: Fianna Fáil
- Status in legislature: Majority government
- Opposition party: Fine Gael
- Opposition leader: John A. Costello

History
- Election: 1957 general election
- Legislature terms: 16th Dáil; 9th Seanad
- Predecessor: 7th government
- Successor: 9th government

=== Nomination of Taoiseach ===
The 16th Dáil first met on 20 March 1957. In the debate on the nomination of Taoiseach, Fianna Fáil leader Éamon de Valera was proposed and this motion was carried with 78 votes in favour and 53 votes against. De Valera was appointed as Taoiseach by President Seán T. O'Kelly.

20 March 1957; Nomination of Éamon de Valera (FF) as Taoiseach; Motion proposed by Seán Lemass and seconded by Seán MacEntee; Absolute majority: 74/147
Vote	Parties	Votes
Yes	Fianna Fáil (76), Independent (2)	78 / 147
No	Fine Gael (39), Labour Party (10), Clann na Talmhan (3), Independent (1)	53 / 147
Absent or Not voting	Ceann Comhairle (1), Fianna Fáil (2), Fine Gael (1), Labour Party (1), Clann na Poblachta (1), Independent (6)	12 / 147
Abstentionist	Sinn Féin (4)	4 / 147

=== Members of the Government ===
After his appointment as Taoiseach by the president, Éamon de Valera proposed the members of the government and they were approved by the Dáil. They were appointed by the president on the same day.

Office	Name	Term
Taoiseach	Éamon de Valera	1957–1959
Tánaiste	Seán Lemass	1957–1959
Minister for Industry and Commerce	Seán Lemass	1957–1959
Minister for Health	Seán MacEntee	1957–1959
Minister for Finance	James Ryan	1957–1959
Minister for External Affairs	Frank Aiken	1957–1959
Minister for Justice	Oscar Traynor	1957–1959
Minister for Local Government	Paddy Smith	1957
Minister for Social Welfare	Paddy Smith	1957
Minister for Lands	Erskine H. Childers	1957–1959
Minister for Education	Jack Lynch	1957–1959
Minister for the Gaeltacht	Jack Lynch	(Acting)
Minister for Posts and Telegraphs	Neil Blaney	1957
Minister for Defence	Kevin Boland	1957–1959
Minister for Agriculture	Frank Aiken	(Acting)
==== Changes 16 May 1957 ==== Appointment of Seán Moylan as minister on his nomination to the Seanad.
Office	Name	Term
Minister for Agriculture	Seán Moylan	1957
==== Changes 26 June 1957 ==== Further appointment.
Office	Name	Term
Minister for the Gaeltacht	Mícheál Ó Móráin	1957–1959
==== Changes 16 November 1957 ==== Following the death of Seán Moylan.
Office	Name	Term
Minister for Agriculture	Frank Aiken	(acting)
==== Changes 27 November 1957 ==== Following the death of Seán Moylan.
Office	Name	Term
Minister for Agriculture	Paddy Smith	1957–1959
Minister for Local Government	Neil Blaney	1957–1959
Minister for Social Welfare	Seán MacEntee	1957–1959
==== Changes 4 December 1957 ==== Following the death of Seán Moylan.
Office	Name	Term
Minister for Posts and Telegraphs	John Ormonde	1957–1959

=== Parliamentary Secretaries ===
On 21 March 1957, the Government appointed the Parliamentary Secretaries on the nomination of the Taoiseach.

Name	Office	Term
Donnchadh Ó Briain	Government Chief Whip	1957–1959
Donnchadh Ó Briain	Parliamentary Secretary to the Minister for Defence	1957–1959
Michael Kennedy	Parliamentary Secretary to the Minister for Social Welfare	1957–1959
Patrick Beegan	Parliamentary Secretary to the Minister for Finance	1957–Feb. 1958
Gerald Bartley	Parliamentary Secretary to the Minister for Industry and Commerce	1957–Feb. 1958
==== Change 24 February 1958 ==== Death of Beegan on 2 February 1958.
Gerald Bartley	Parliamentary Secretary to the Minister for Finance	Feb. 1958–1959
Michael Hilliard	Parliamentary Secretary to the Minister for Industry and Commerce	Feb. 1958–1959

=== Confidence in the government ===
On 29 October 1958, William Norton, leader of the Labour Party, tabled a vote of no confidence in the government. James Dillon and Liam Cosgrave of Fine Gael proposed an amendment to the motion. Both the amendment and the motion were defeated the following day on a vote of 54 to 71.

=== Constitutional referendum ===
The government proposed the Third Amendment of the Constitution Bill 1958, which would have altered the electoral system from proportional representation by means of the single transferable vote to first past the post. It was put to a referendum on 17 June 1959, the same date as the presidential election. It was defeated by a margin of 48.2% to 51.8% of votes cast.

=== Resignation ===
On 17 June 1959, Éamon de Valera was elected as president of Ireland and he resigned as Taoiseach on that day. Under Article 28.11 of the Constitution, all members of the government are deemed to have resigned on the resignation of the Taoiseach, but they continued to carry on their duties until the appointment of their successors.

== 9th government of Ireland ==
9th government of Ireland
- 9th Government of Ireland

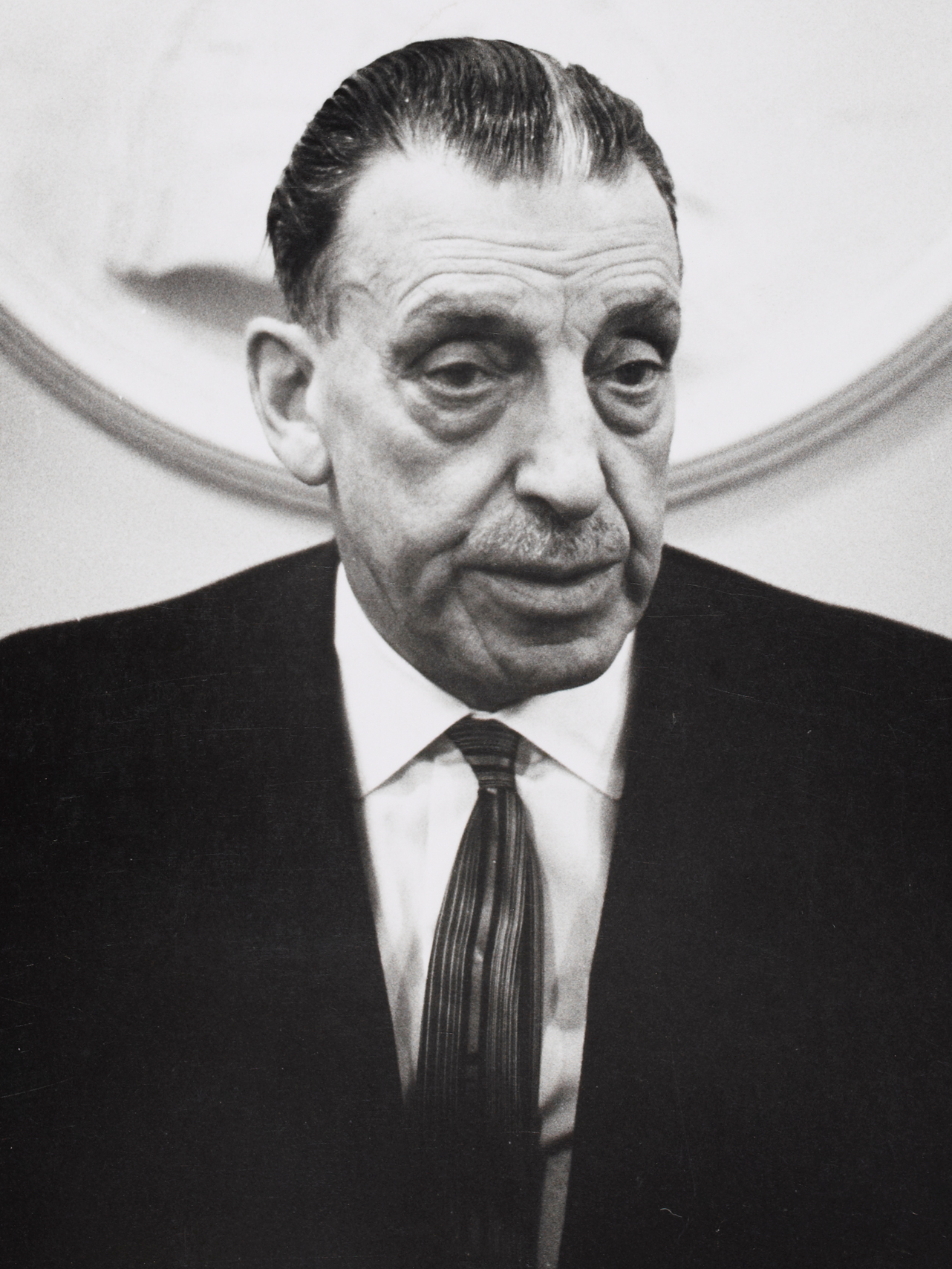
- Date formed: 23 June 1959
- Date dissolved: 11 October 1961

People and organisations
- President: Éamon de Valera
- Taoiseach: Seán Lemass
- Tánaiste: Seán MacEntee
- Total no. of members: 14
- Member party: Fianna Fáil
- Status in legislature: Majority government
- Opposition party: Fine Gael
- Opposition leader: James Dillon

History
- Legislature terms: 16th Dáil; 9th Seanad
- Predecessor: 8th government
- Successor: 10th government

Éamon de Valera resigned as leader of Fianna Fáil after his election as president of Ireland and Seán Lemass was elected unopposed to succeed him on 22 June 1959.

=== Nomination of Taoiseach ===
On 23 June 1959, in the debate on the nomination of Taoiseach, Fianna Fáil leader Seán Lemass was proposed. This motion was carried with 75 votes in favour to 51 votes against. Lemass was appointed as Taoiseach by President Seán T. O'Kelly. It was the first time there was a change of Taoiseach within a Dáil term.

23 June 1959; Nomination of Seán Lemass (FF) as Taoiseach; Motion proposed by Seán MacEntee and seconded by James Ryan; Absolute majority: 74/147
Vote	Parties	Votes
Yes	Fianna Fáil (72), Independent (3)	75 / 147
No	Fine Gael (37), Labour Party (9), Clann na Talmhan (3), Clann na Poblachta (1), Independent (1)	51 / 147
Absent or Not voting	Ceann Comhairle (1), Fianna Fáil (3), Fine Gael (3), Labour Party (2), Independent (5)	14 / 147
Abstentionist	Sinn Féin (4)	4 / 147
Vacancies	3	3 / 147

=== Members of the Government ===
After his appointment as Taoiseach by the president, Seán Lemass proposed the members of the government and they were approved by the Dáil. They were appointed by the president on 24 June 1959.

Office	Name	Term
Taoiseach	Seán Lemass	1959–1961
Tánaiste	Seán MacEntee	1959–1961
Minister for Health	Seán MacEntee	1959–1961
Minister for Social Welfare	Seán MacEntee	1959–1961
Minister for Finance	James Ryan	1959–1961
Minister for External Affairs	Frank Aiken	1959–1961
Minister for Justice	Oscar Traynor	1959–1961
Minister for Agriculture	Paddy Smith	1959–1961
Minister for Lands	Erskine H. Childers	1959–1961
Minister for Industry and Commerce	Jack Lynch	1959–1961
Minister for Local Government	Neil Blaney	1959–1961
Minister for Defence	Kevin Boland	1959–1961
Minister for the Gaeltacht	Mícheál Ó Móráin	1959
Minister for Posts and Telegraphs	Michael Hilliard	1959–1961
Minister for Education	Patrick Hillery	1959–1961
==== Changes 27 July 1959 ==== Gerard Bartley was appointed to government on 23 July and the changes took effect when the Department of Transport and Power was established.
Office	Name	Term
Minister for the Gaeltacht	Gerald Bartley	1959–1961
Minister for Lands	Mícheál Ó Móráin	1959–1961
Minister for Transport and Power	Erskine H. Childers	1959–1961

=== Parliamentary Secretaries ===
On 24 June 1959, the government appointed the Parliamentary Secretaries on the nomination of the Taoiseach.

Name	Office	Term
Donnchadh Ó Briain	Government Chief Whip	1959–1961
Donnchadh Ó Briain	Parliamentary Secretary to the Minister for Defence	1959–1961
Michael Kennedy	Parliamentary Secretary to the Minister for Social Welfare	1959–1961
Gerald Bartley	Parliamentary Secretary to the Minister for Finance	June–July 1959
==== Change 24 July 1959 ==== Following the appointment of Gerard Bartley to government.
Joseph Brennan	Parliamentary Secretary to the Minister for Finance	July 1959 – 1961
==== Change 9 May 1960 ==== Additional appointment
Charles Haughey	Parliamentary Secretary to the Minister for Justice	1960–1961
