= Timmy Dooley =

Irish politician (born 1969)

Timmy Dooley TD
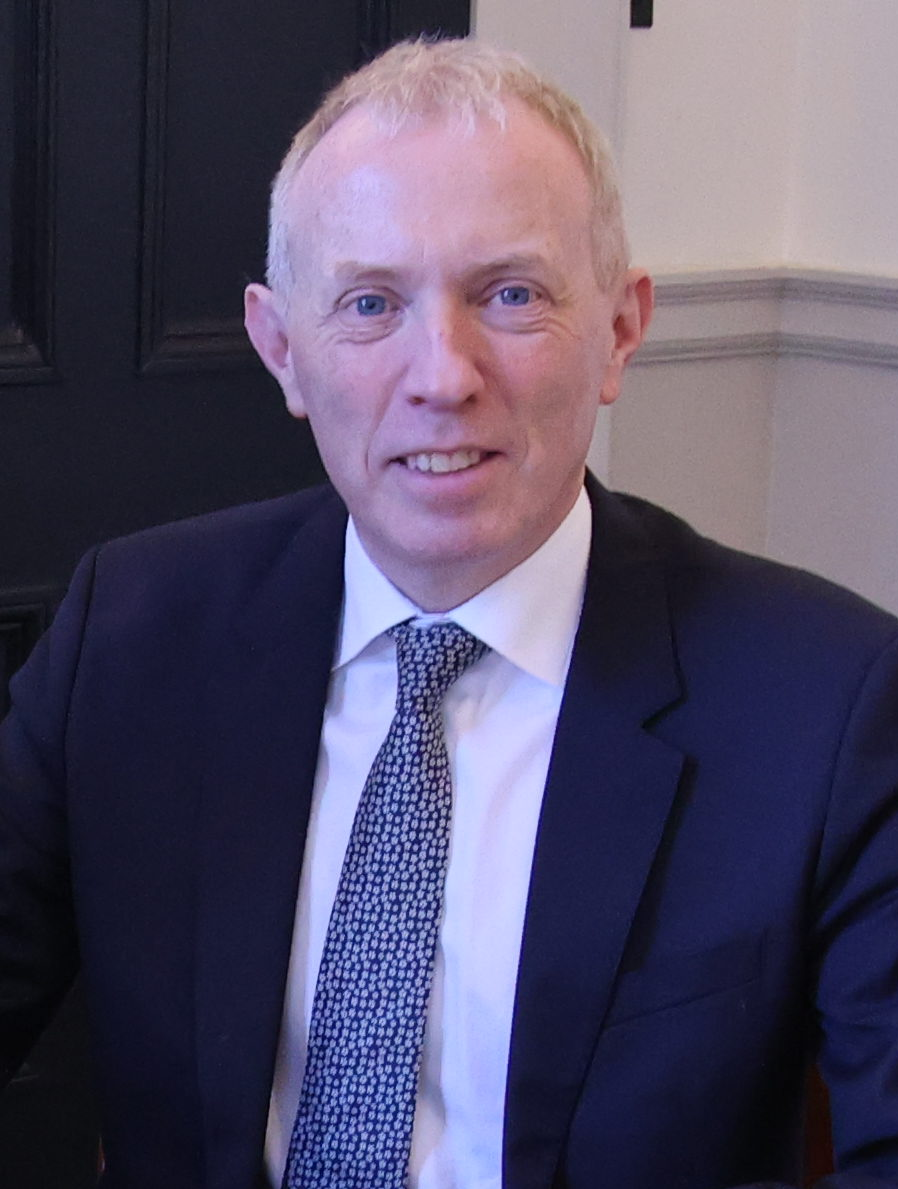
- Dooley in 2024

Minister of State
- 2025–: Agriculture, Food, Fisheries and the Marine
- 2025–: Climate, Energy and the Environment

Teachta Dála
- Incumbent
- Assumed office November 2024
- In office May 2007 – February 2020
- Constituency: Clare

Senator
- In office 29 June 2020 – 30 November 2024
- Constituency: Nominated by the Taoiseach
- In office 12 September 2002 – 24 May 2007
- Constituency: Administrative Panel

Personal details
- Born: 13 February 1969 (age 57) Limerick, Ireland
- Party: Fianna Fáil
- Spouse: Emer McMahon (m. 2002)
- Children: 2
- Education: University College Dublin

Timmy Dooley (born 13 February 1969) is an Irish Fianna Fáil politician who has served as Minister of State at the Department of Agriculture, Food, Fisheries and the Marine and Minister of State at the Department of Climate, Energy and the Environment since February 2025. He has been a Teachta Dála (TD) for the Clare constituency since the 2024 general election, and previously from 2007 to 2020. He served as a Senator from 2020 to 2024, after being nominated by the Taoiseach, and from 2002 to 2007 for the Administrative Panel.

== Early and personal life ==
Dooley was born in Limerick and was educated at Mountshannon National School and Scarriff Community College, and later at University College Dublin, where he was chairman of the Kevin Barry Cumann of Ógra Fianna Fáil in 1989. He is married to Emer McMahon and they have two daughters.

== Political career ==
Dooley was first elected to the Dáil at the 2007 general election for the Clare constituency, topping the poll with 10,791 votes. He served as spokesperson for Transport, Tourism and Sport from 2011 to 2016, and as a spokesperson for Communications, Climate Action and Environment from May 2016 to February 2020.

In January 2018, Dooley voiced his support for repealing the Eighth Amendment.

In October 2019, Dooley was involved in a voting controversy in the Dáil when he was absent from the chamber during voting but a vote was recorded in his seat six times. An Oireachtas report into the incident revealed that fellow Fianna Fáil TD Niall Collins voted on behalf of Dooley on each occasion, as well as casting votes at other seats. Video footage showed Dooley talking to Collins prior to leaving the chamber, during which Dooley pointed to his seat and Collins nodded. Dooley claimed in the Oireachtas report that he had not asked Collins to vote on his behalf during this conversation. When questioned, Dooley accepted that he had made no effort to correct the record prior to being contacted by a journalist about the incident.

In a rare occurrence for an opposition TD, an amendment Dooley introduced was accepted to road traffic legislation, for significant penalties for the criminal offence of leaving the scene of a serious or fatal crash.

He lost his seat at the general election in 2020 general election. He was an unsuccessful candidate at the 2020 Seanad election, but was subsequently nominated by the Taoiseach, Micheál Martin to the 26th Seanad in June 2020.

Dooley was co-president of the Alliance of Liberals and Democrats for Europe Party from 2021 until 2024.

He had one of the lowest voting records in the Seanad in 2024.

He was elected to the Dáil for Clare at the 2024 general election. On 25 February 2025, he was appointed as Minister of State at the Department of Agriculture, Food, Fisheries and the Marine with special responsibility for fisheries and as Minister of State at the Department of Climate, Energy and the Environment with special responsibility for the marine.

Political offices
New office	Minister of State at the Department of Agriculture, Food, Fisheries and the Marine; 2025–present	Incumbent
New office	Minister of State at the Department of Climate, Energy and the Environment; 2025–present	Incumbent

Dáil	Election	Deputy (Party)	Deputy (Party)	Deputy (Party)	Deputy (Party)	Deputy (Party)
2nd	1921	Éamon de Valera (SF)	Brian O'Higgins (SF)	Seán Liddy (SF)	Patrick Brennan (SF)	4 seats 1921–1923
3rd	1922	Éamon de Valera (AT-SF)	Brian O'Higgins (AT-SF)	Seán Liddy (PT-SF)	Patrick Brennan (PT-SF)	4 seats 1921–1923
4th	1923	Éamon de Valera (Rep)	Brian O'Higgins (Rep)	Conor Hogan (FP)	Patrick Hogan (Lab)	Eoin MacNeill (CnaG)
5th	1927 (Jun)	Éamon de Valera (FF)	Patrick Houlihan (FF)	Thomas Falvey (FP)	Patrick Hogan (Lab)	Patrick Kelly (CnaG)
6th	1927 (Sep)	Éamon de Valera (FF)	Patrick Houlihan (FF)	Martin Sexton (FF)	Patrick Hogan (Lab)	Patrick Kelly (CnaG)
7th	1932	Éamon de Valera (FF)	Seán O'Grady (FF)	Martin Sexton (FF)	Patrick Hogan (Lab)	Patrick Burke (CnaG)
8th	1933	Éamon de Valera (FF)	Seán O'Grady (FF)	Patrick Houlihan (FF)	Patrick Hogan (Lab)	Patrick Burke (CnaG)
9th	1937	Éamon de Valera (FF)	Seán O'Grady (FF)	Thomas Burke (FP)	Patrick Hogan (Lab)	Patrick Burke (FG)
10th	1938	Éamon de Valera (FF)	Seán O'Grady (FF)	Thomas Burke (FP)	Peter O'Loghlen (FF)	Patrick Burke (FG)
11th	1943	Éamon de Valera (FF)	Seán O'Grady (FF)	Thomas Burke (FP)	Patrick Hogan (Lab)	Patrick Burke (FG)
12th	1944	Éamon de Valera (FF)	Seán O'Grady (FF)	Thomas Burke (FP)	Peter O'Loghlen (FF)	Patrick Burke (FG)
12th	1945 by-election	Éamon de Valera (FF)	Seán O'Grady (FF)	Thomas Burke (FP)	Peter O'Loghlen (FF)	Patrick Shanahan (FF)
13th	1948	Éamon de Valera (FF)	Seán O'Grady (FF)	Thomas Burke (FP)	Patrick Hogan (Lab)	4 seats 1948–1969
14th	1951	Éamon de Valera (FF)	Patrick Hillery (FF)	William Murphy (FG)	Patrick Hogan (Lab)	4 seats 1948–1969
15th	1954	Éamon de Valera (FF)	Patrick Hillery (FF)	William Murphy (FG)	Patrick Hogan (Lab)	4 seats 1948–1969
16th	1957	Éamon de Valera (FF)	Patrick Hillery (FF)	William Murphy (FG)	Patrick Hogan (Lab)	4 seats 1948–1969
16th	1959 by-election	Seán Ó Ceallaigh (FF)	Patrick Hillery (FF)	William Murphy (FG)	Patrick Hogan (Lab)	4 seats 1948–1969
17th	1961	Seán Ó Ceallaigh (FF)	Patrick Hillery (FF)	William Murphy (FG)	Patrick Hogan (Lab)	4 seats 1948–1969
18th	1965	Seán Ó Ceallaigh (FF)	Patrick Hillery (FF)	William Murphy (FG)	Patrick Hogan (Lab)	4 seats 1948–1969
18th	1968 by-election	Seán Ó Ceallaigh (FF)	Patrick Hillery (FF)	Sylvester Barrett (FF)	Patrick Hogan (Lab)	4 seats 1948–1969
19th	1969	Frank Taylor (FG)	Patrick Hillery (FF)	Sylvester Barrett (FF)	3 seats 1969–1981	
20th	1973	Frank Taylor (FG)	Brendan Daly (FF)	Sylvester Barrett (FF)	3 seats 1969–1981	
21st	1977	Frank Taylor (FG)	Brendan Daly (FF)	Sylvester Barrett (FF)	3 seats 1969–1981	
22nd	1981	Madeleine Taylor (FG)	Brendan Daly (FF)	Sylvester Barrett (FF)	Bill Loughnane (FF)	4 seats since 1981
23rd	1982 (Feb)	Donal Carey (FG)	Brendan Daly (FF)	Sylvester Barrett (FF)	Bill Loughnane (FF)	4 seats since 1981
24th	1982 (Nov)	Donal Carey (FG)	Brendan Daly (FF)	Sylvester Barrett (FF)	Madeleine Taylor-Quinn (FG)	4 seats since 1981
25th	1987	Donal Carey (FG)	Brendan Daly (FF)	Síle de Valera (FF)	Madeleine Taylor-Quinn (FG)	4 seats since 1981
26th	1989	Donal Carey (FG)	Brendan Daly (FF)	Síle de Valera (FF)	Madeleine Taylor-Quinn (FG)	4 seats since 1981
27th	1992	Donal Carey (FG)	Moosajee Bhamjee (Lab)	Síle de Valera (FF)	Tony Killeen (FF)	4 seats since 1981
28th	1997	Donal Carey (FG)	Brendan Daly (FF)	Síle de Valera (FF)	Tony Killeen (FF)	4 seats since 1981
29th	2002	Pat Breen (FG)	James Breen (Ind.)	Síle de Valera (FF)	Tony Killeen (FF)	4 seats since 1981
30th	2007	Pat Breen (FG)	Joe Carey (FG)	Timmy Dooley (FF)	Tony Killeen (FF)	4 seats since 1981
31st	2011	Pat Breen (FG)	Joe Carey (FG)	Timmy Dooley (FF)	Michael McNamara (Lab)	4 seats since 1981
32nd	2016	Pat Breen (FG)	Joe Carey (FG)	Timmy Dooley (FF)	Michael Harty (Ind.)	4 seats since 1981
33rd	2020	Violet-Anne Wynne (SF)	Joe Carey (FG)	Cathal Crowe (FF)	Michael McNamara (Ind.)	4 seats since 1981
34th	2024	Donna McGettigan (SF)	Joe Cooney (FG)	Cathal Crowe (FF)	Timmy Dooley (FF)	4 seats since 1981
