= Tánaiste =

Deputy head of the government of Ireland

- Incumbent; Simon Harris since 23 January 2025
- Executive branch of the Irish Government
- Style: Tánaiste; Irish: A Thánaiste
- Type: Deputy prime minister
- Status: Cabinet minister
- Member of: Government of Ireland; Council of State; Dáil Éireann
- Reports to: Taoiseach
- Seat: Dublin, Ireland
- Nominator: Taoiseach
- Appointer: President of Ireland; (on the advice of the Taoiseach)
- Inaugural holder: Seán T. O'Kelly
- Formation: 29 December 1937
- Salary: €229,473 (2025) (including €115,953 TD salary)

The tánaiste (/ˈtɔːnɪʃtə/, Irish: [ˈt̪ˠaːn̪ˠəʃtʲə]) is the deputy head of government of the Republic of Ireland and second highest ranking member of the executive branch. The tánaiste is the equivalent of the deputy prime minister in other parliamentary systems.

The tánaiste is appointed by the president of Ireland on the advice of the taoiseach. The current office holder is Simon Harris, TD, who was appointed on 23 January 2025.

== History ==
Under the Gaelic system of tanistry, the word tánaiste (plural tánaistí, pronounced [ˈt̪ˠaːn̪ˠəʃtʲiː], approximately /ˈtɔːnɪʃtiː/) had been used for the heir of the chief (taoiseach) or king (rí). The word was adopted in the 1937 Constitution of Ireland as the title for a member of the government nominated by the Taoiseach to act in their place as needed during periods of the Taoiseach's temporary absence.

Tánaiste is the official title of the deputy head of government in both English and Irish, and is not used for other countries' deputy prime ministers, who are referred to in Irish by the generic term leas-phríomh-aire, pronounced [ˈl̠ʲasˠ ˌfʲɾʲiːw ˈaɾʲə], approximately /ˌlæsfriːˈvɛərə/. The Irish form, an Tánaiste, is sometimes used in English instead of "the Tánaiste".

== Overview ==
The office was created in 1937 under the new Constitution of Ireland and replaced the previous office of Vice-President of the Executive Council, which had existed under the Constitution of the Irish Free State, and which was first held by Kevin O'Higgins of Cumann na nGaedheal from 1922 to 1927.

The Taoiseach nominates one member of the Government to the office who is required to be a member of Dáil Éireann. The nominee then receives their seal of office from the President of Ireland in recognition of the appointment. The Tánaiste acts in the place of the Taoiseach during a temporary absence. In the event of the Taoiseach's death or permanent incapacitation, the Tánaiste acts as Taoiseach until another is appointed. The Tánaiste is, ex officio, a member of the Council of State. The Tánaiste chairs meetings of the government in the absence of the Taoiseach and may take questions on their behalf in the Dáil or Seanad.

Aside from those duties, the title is largely honorific as the Constitution does not confer any additional powers on the office holder over and above the other members of the Government. In theory, the Tánaiste could be a minister without portfolio, but every Tánaiste has in parallel held a ministerial portfolio as head of a Department of state. The Department of the Taoiseach is a Department of state, but there is no equivalent for the Tánaiste. Dick Spring in the Rainbow Coalition (1994–1997) had an official "Office of the Tánaiste", but other parties have not used that nomenclature. Under Spring, Eithne Fitzgerald was "Minister of State at the Office of the Tánaiste", with responsibility for co-ordinating Labour policy in the coalition.

Under a coalition government, the Tánaiste is typically the leader of the second-largest coalition partner, just as the Taoiseach is usually leader of the coalition's senior partner. However, during the coalition governments in 1989–1992 and 2007–2011, the position was held by Fianna Fáil's deputy leader, rather than the leader of a junior partner. As part of a rotating Taoiseach agreement since 2020, the role of Tánaiste gained increased prominence and responsibility in coordinating and Government policy as it was held by Leo Varadkar for the first half of the Government's term in office prior to his appointment as Taoiseach and Micheál Martin in the second half.

The office of Tánaiste is as yet the highest government rank attained by a woman Minister.

Four Tánaistí later held the office of Taoiseach: Seán Lemass, Bertie Ahern, Brian Cowen, and Leo Varadkar (his second term as Taoiseach). Varadkar is also one of three Tánaistí, with Micheál Martin and Simon Harris, to have previously held the office of Taoiseach before becoming Tánaiste. Two Tánaistí were later elected as President of Ireland: Seán T. O'Kelly and Erskine H. Childers.

== List of office-holders ==
=== Vice-President of the Executive Council ===
No.	Portrait	Name (Birth–Death) Constituency	Term of office		Party	Exec. Council (President)	Ministries as Vice-President
1		Kevin O'Higgins (1892–1927); TD for Leix–Offaly until 1923; TD for Dublin County from 1923	6 December 1922	10 July 1927	Cumann na nGaedheal	1·2 (W.T.Cosgrave)	Justice (1922–1927)
2		Ernest Blythe (1889–1975); TD for Monaghan	14 July 1927	9 March 1932	Cumann na nGaedheal	3·4·5 (W.T.Cosgrave)	Posts and Telegraphs (1927–1932)
3		Seán T. O'Kelly (1882–1966); TD for Dublin North until 1937; TD for Dublin North-West from 1937	9 March 1932	29 December 1937	Fianna Fáil	6·7·8 (de Valera)	Local Government and Public Health (1932–1937)
=== Tánaiste ===
No.	Portrait	Name (Birth–Death) Constituency	Term of office		Party	Government (Taoiseach)	Ministries as Tánaiste Higher Offices Held
(3)		Seán T. O'Kelly (1882–1966); TD for Dublin North-West	29 December 1937	14 June 1945	Fianna Fáil	1·2·3·4 (de Valera)	Local Government and Public Health (1937–1939); Education (1939); Finance (1939–1945); President of Ireland (1945–1959)
4		Seán Lemass (1899–1971); TD for Dublin South	14 June 1945	18 February 1948	Fianna Fáil	4 (de Valera)	Supplies (1945); Industry and Commerce (1945–1948)
5		William Norton (1900–1963); TD for Kildare	18 February 1948	13 June 1951	Labour	5 (Costello)	Social Welfare (1948–1951)
(4)		Seán Lemass (1899–1971); TD for Dublin South-Central	13 June 1951	2 June 1954	Fianna Fáil	6 (de Valera)	Industry and Commerce (1951–1954)
(5)		William Norton (1900–1963); TD for Kildare	2 June 1954	20 March 1957	Labour	7 (Costello)	Industry and Commerce (1954–1957)
(4)		Seán Lemass (1899–1971); TD for Dublin South-Central	20 March 1957	23 June 1959	Fianna Fáil	8 (de Valera)	Industry and Commerce (1957–1959); Taoiseach (1959–1966)
6		Seán MacEntee (1889–1984); TD for Dublin South-East	23 June 1959	21 April 1965	Fianna Fáil	9·10 (Lemass)	Health (1959–1965)
7		Frank Aiken (1898–1983); TD for Louth	21 April 1965	2 July 1969	Fianna Fáil	11 (Lemass); 12 (Lynch)	External Affairs (1965–1969)
8		Erskine H. Childers (1905–1974); TD for Monaghan	2 July 1969	14 March 1973	Fianna Fáil	13 (Lynch)	Health (1969–1973); President of Ireland (1973–1974)
9		Brendan Corish (1918–1990); TD for Wexford	14 March 1973	5 July 1977	Labour	14 (L. Cosgrave)	Health (1973–1977)
10		George Colley (1925–1983); TD for Dublin Clontarf	5 July 1977	30 June 1981	Fianna Fáil	15 (Lynch); 16 (Haughey)	Finance (1977–1979); Tourism and Transport (1979–1980); Energy (1980–1981)
11		Michael O'Leary (1936–2006); TD for Dublin Central	30 June 1981	9 March 1982	Labour	17 (FitzGerald)	Energy (1981–1982)
12		Ray MacSharry (born 1938); TD for Sligo–Leitrim	9 March 1982	14 December 1982	Fianna Fáil	18 (Haughey)	Finance (1982)
13		Dick Spring (born 1950); TD for Kerry North	14 December 1982	20 January 1987	Labour	19 (FitzGerald)	Environment (1982–1983); Energy (1983–1987)
14		Peter Barry (1928–2016); TD for Cork South-Central	20 January 1987	10 March 1987	Fine Gael	19 (FitzGerald)	Foreign Affairs (1987)
15		Brian Lenihan (1930–1995); TD for Dublin West	10 March 1987	31 October 1990	Fianna Fáil	20·21 (Haughey)	Foreign Affairs (1987–1989); Defence (1989–1990)
16		John Wilson (1923–2007); TD for Cavan–Monaghan	13 November 1990	12 January 1993	Fianna Fáil	21 (Haughey)	Marine (1990–1992)
16		John Wilson (1923–2007); TD for Cavan–Monaghan	13 November 1990	12 January 1993	Fianna Fáil	22 (Reynolds)	Defence and Gaeltacht (1992–1993)
(13)		Dick Spring (born 1950); TD for Kerry North	12 January 1993	17 November 1994	Labour	23 (Reynolds)	Foreign Affairs (1993–1994)
17		Bertie Ahern (born 1951); TD for Dublin Central	17 November 1994	15 December 1994	Fianna Fáil	23 (Reynolds)	Finance (1994); Taoiseach (1997–2008)
(13)		Dick Spring (born 1950); TD for Kerry North	15 December 1994	26 June 1997	Labour	24 (Bruton)	Foreign Affairs (1994–1997)
18		Mary Harney (born 1953); TD for Dublin South-West until 2002; TD for Dublin Mid-West from 2002	26 June 1997	13 September 2006	Progressive Democrats	25·26 (Ahern)	Enterprise, Trade and Employment (1997–2004); Health and Children (2004–2006)
19		Michael McDowell (born 1951); TD for Dublin South-East	13 September 2006	14 June 2007	Progressive Democrats	26 (Ahern)	Justice, Equality and Law Reform (2002–2007)
20		Brian Cowen (born 1960); TD for Laois–Offaly	14 June 2007	7 May 2008	Fianna Fáil	27 (Ahern)	Finance (2007–2008); Taoiseach (2008–2011)
21		Mary Coughlan (born 1965); TD for Donegal South-West	7 May 2008	9 March 2011	Fianna Fáil	28 (Cowen)	Enterprise, Trade and Employment (2008–2010); Education and Skills (2010–2011); Health and Children (2011)
22		Eamon Gilmore (born 1955); TD for Dún Laoghaire	9 March 2011	4 July 2014	Labour	29 (Kenny)	Foreign Affairs and Trade (2011–2014)
23		Joan Burton (born 1949); TD for Dublin West	4 July 2014	6 May 2016	Labour	29 (Kenny)	Social Protection (2014–2016)
24		Frances Fitzgerald (born 1950); TD for Dublin Mid-West	6 May 2016	28 November 2017	Fine Gael	30 (Kenny)	Justice and Equality (2016–2017)
24		Frances Fitzgerald (born 1950); TD for Dublin Mid-West	6 May 2016	28 November 2017	Fine Gael	31 (Varadkar)	Business, Enterprise and Innovation (2017)
25		Simon Coveney (born 1972); TD for Cork South-Central	30 November 2017	27 June 2020	Fine Gael	31 (Varadkar)	Foreign Affairs and Trade (2017–2020)
26		Leo Varadkar (born 1979); TD for Dublin West	27 June 2020	17 December 2022	Fine Gael	32 (Martin)	Enterprise, Trade and Employment (2020–2022); Taoiseach (2017−2020, 2022–2024)
27		Micheál Martin (born 1960); TD for Cork South-Central	17 December 2022	23 January 2025	Fianna Fáil	33 (Varadkar)	Taoiseach (2020−2022, 2025−present); Foreign Affairs (2022–2025); Defence (2022–2025)
27		Micheál Martin (born 1960); TD for Cork South-Central	17 December 2022	23 January 2025	Fianna Fáil	34 (Harris)	Taoiseach (2020−2022, 2025−present); Foreign Affairs (2022–2025); Defence (2022–2025)
28		Simon Harris (born 1986); TD for Wicklow	23 January 2025	Incumbent	Fine Gael	35 (Martin)	Taoiseach (2024−2025); Foreign Affairs and Trade (2025); Defence (2025); Finance (2025−present)

== Timeline ==
This is a graphical lifespan timeline of Tánaistí. They are listed in order of office (Lemass, Norton, and Spring are shown in order of their first terms).
