= Minister of State at the Department of Climate, Energy and the Environment =

List of Irish Ministers of State

The minister of state at the Department of the Climate, Energy and the Environment is a junior ministerial post in the Department of Climate, Energy and the Environment of the Government of Ireland who may perform functions delegated by the minister for climate, energy and the environment. A minister of state does not hold cabinet rank.

There are currently two ministers of state:

- Alan Dillon, TD – Minister of State for the circular economy
- Timmy Dooley, TD – Minister of State for the marine

== List of parliamentary secretaries ==
=== Department of Lands and Fisheries 1927–1937 ===
Name	Term of Office		Party	Government
Martin Roddy	21 September 1927	9 March 1932	Cumann na nGaedheal	3rd EC • 4th EC • 5th EC
Seán O'Grady	9 March 1932	29 December 1937	Fianna Fáil	6th EC • 7th EC • 8th EC
=== Department of Lands 1937–1965 ===
Name	Term of Office		Party	Government
Seán O'Grady	29 December 1937	9 February 1943	Fianna Fáil	1st • 2nd
Eamon Kissane	9 February 1943	1 July 1943	Fianna Fáil	2nd
Jack Lynch	13 June 1951	2 June 1954	Fianna Fáil	6th
Brian Lenihan	11 October 1961	3 November 1964	Fianna Fáil	10th
George Colley	21 November 1964	21 April 1965	Fianna Fáil	10th
=== Department of Fisheries 1977–1978 ===
Name	Term of Office		Party	Government
Michael Pat Murphy	9 February 1977	5 July 1977	Labour	14th

== List of ministers of state ==
=== Department of Fisheries and Forestry 1978–1986 ===
Name	Term of office		Party	Responsibilities	Government
Tom McEllistrim	23 March 1982	14 December 1982	Fianna Fáil	Forestry	18th
Michael D'Arcy	16 December 1982	18 February 1986	Fine Gael	Fisheries and Forestry	19th
=== Department of Tourism, Fisheries and Forestry 1986–1987 ===
Name	Term of office		Party	Responsibilities	Government
John Donnellan	13 February 1986	10 March 1987	Fine Gael	Fisheries	19th
Michael Moynihan	13 February 1986	10 March 1987	Fine Gael	Tourism	19th
Michael Smith	10 March 1987	31 March 1987	Fianna Fáil	Forestry	20th
Denis Lyons	10 March 1987	31 March 1987	Fianna Fáil	Tourism	20th
=== Department of the Marine 1987–1997 ===
Name	Term of office		Party	Responsibilities	Government
Pat "the Cope" Gallagher	12 March 1987	12 July 1989	Fianna Fáil	Marine matters	20th
Michael J. Noonan	19 July 1989	11 February 1992	Fianna Fáil		21st
Pat "the Cope" Gallagher	13 February 1992	12 January 1993	Fianna Fáil		22nd
Gerry O'Sullivan	14 January 1993	5 August 1994	Labour	Port Development, Safety and Inland Fisheries	23rd
Eamon Gilmore	20 December 1994	26 June 1997	Democratic Left		24th
=== Department of the Marine and Natural Resources 1997–2002 ===
Name	Term of office		Party	Responsibilities	Government
Hugh Byrne	8 July 1997	6 June 2002	Fianna Fáil	Aquaculture and Forestry	25th
=== Department of Communications, Marine and Natural Resources 2002–2007 ===
Name	Term of office		Party	Responsibilities	Government
John Browne	19 June 2002	29 September 2004	Fianna Fáil	Marine	26th
Pat "the Cope" Gallagher	29 September 2004	14 February 2006	Fianna Fáil	Marine	26th
John Browne	14 February 2006	14 June 2007	Fianna Fáil	Marine	26th
=== Department of Communications, Energy and Natural Resources 2007–2016 ===
Name	Term of office		Party	Responsibilities	Government
Tony Killeen	20 June 2007	7 May 2008	Fianna Fáil	Energy	27th
Seán Power	13 May 2008	22 April 2009	Fianna Fáil	Information society and Natural resources	28th
Conor Lenihan	22 April 2009	9 March 2011	Fianna Fáil	Natural resources	28th
Fergus O'Dowd	10 March 2011	15 July 2014	Fine Gael	New ERA	29th
Joe McHugh	15 July 2014	6 May 2016	Fine Gael	Natural resources	29th
=== Department of Communications, Climate Action and Environment 2016–2020 ===
Name	Term of office		Party	Responsibilities	Government
Seán Kyne	19 May 2016	14 June 2017	Fine Gael	Natural resources	30th
Seán Kyne	20 June 2017	16 October 2018	Fine Gael	Natural resources and Digital development	31st
Seán Canney	16 October 2018	27 June 2020	Independent	Natural resources and Digital development	31st
=== Department of the Environment, Climate and Communications 2020–2025 ===
Name	Term of office		Party	Responsibilities	Government
Hildegarde Naughton	27 June 2020	21 December 2022	Fine Gael	Postal Policy and Eircodes	32nd
Ossian Smyth	1 July 2020	23 January 2025	Green	Communications and Circular Economy	32nd • 33rd • 34th
Jack Chambers	21 December 2022	26 June 2024	Fianna Fáil	Postal Policy	32nd • 33rd • 34th
James Lawless	27 June 2024	23 January 2025	Fianna Fáil	Postal Policy	34th
=== Department of Climate, Energy and the Environment 2025–present ===
Name	Term of office		Party	Responsibilities	Government
Alan Dillon	29 January 2025	Incumbent	Fine Gael	Circular economy	35th
Timmy Dooley	23 February 2025	Incumbent	Fianna Fáil	Marine	35th
