= Minister of State at the Department of Housing, Local Government and Heritage =

List of Irish ministers of state

The minister of state at the Department of Housing, Local Government and Heritage is a junior ministerial post in the Department of Housing, Local Government and Heritage of the Government of Ireland who may perform functions delegated by the minister for housing, local government and heritage. A minister of state does not hold cabinet rank.

There are currently three ministers of state:

- John Cummins, TD – Minister of State for local government and planning
- Christopher O'Sullivan, TD – Minister of State for nature, heritage and biodiversity
- Kieran O'Donnell, TD – Minister of State for housing

== List of parliamentary secretaries ==
=== Department of Local Government and Public Health 1932–1947 ===
Name	Term of office		Party	Government
Conn Ward	15 March 1932	13 July 1946	Fianna Fáil	6th EC • 7th EC • 8th EC • 1st • 2nd • 3rd • 4th
Hugo Flinn	12 September 1941	28 January 1943	Fianna Fáil	2nd
Erskine H. Childers	31 March 1944	18 February 1948	Fianna Fáil	3rd • 4th
=== Department of Local Government 1948–1977 ===
Name	Term of office		Party	Government
Brendan Corish	24 February 1948	13 June 1951	Labour	5th
William Davin	3 June 1954	1 March 1956	Labour	7th
Dan Spring	22 March 1956	20 March 1957	Labour	7th
Paudge Brennan	21 April 1965	8 May 1970	Fianna Fáil	11th • 12th • 13th
Liam Cunningham	9 May 1970	14 March 1973	Fianna Fáil	13th
Michael Begley	14 March 1973	30 September 1975	Fine Gael	14th
Oliver J. Flanagan	30 September 1975	16 December 1976	Fine Gael	14th
Patrick J. Reynolds	17 December 1976	5 July 1977	Fine Gael	14th

== List of ministers of state ==
=== Department of the Environment 1978–1997 ===
Name	Term of office		Party	Responsibilities	Government
John O'Leary	1 January 1978	11 December 1979	Fianna Fáil	Planning, Roads, Water Safety, Housing, Traffic, Water and Sewerage Schemes	15th
Jackie Fahey	12 December 1979	30 June 1981	Fianna Fáil		16th
Ger Connolly	12 December 1979	30 June 1981	Fianna Fáil		16th
Fergus O'Brien	30 June 1981	11 November 1981	Fine Gael	Housing	17th
Donal Creed	11 November 1981	9 March 1982	Fine Gael	Housing	17th
Ger Connolly	9 March 1982	14 December 1982	Fianna Fáil	Housing	18th
Gerard Brady	9 March 1982	27 October 1982	Fianna Fáil	Urban Renewal	18th
Niall Andrews	28 October 1982	14 December 1982	Fianna Fáil	Urban Renewal	18th
Ruairi Quinn	14 December 1982	13 December 1983	Labour	Urban Affairs and Housing	19th
Fergus O'Brien	15 December 1983	10 March 1987	Fine Gael	Urban Affairs, Housing and Local Government Reform	19th
Toddy O'Sullivan	13 February 1986	10 March 1987	Labour	Grants Administration	19th
Avril Doyle	18 February 1986	10 March 1987	Fine Gael	Environmental Protection	19th
Ger Connolly	12 March 1987	12 July 1989	Fianna Fáil	Urban Renewal	20th
Ger Connolly	12 July 1989	11 February 1992	Fianna Fáil	Urban Renewal	21st
Mary Harney	12 July 1989	11 February 1992	Progressive Democrats	Protection of the Environment	21st
Mary Harney	11 February 1992	4 November 1992	Progressive Democrats	Protection of the Environment	22nd
Dan Wallace	13 February 1992	12 January 1993	Fianna Fáil		22nd
John Browne	14 January 1993	15 December 1994	Fianna Fáil	Environmental Protection	23rd
Emmet Stagg	14 January 1993	17 November 1994	Labour	Housing and Urban Renewal	23rd
Bernard Allen	20 December 1994	26 June 1997	Fine Gael	Local government reform	24th
Liz McManus	20 December 1994	26 June 1997	Democratic Left		24th
=== Department of the Environment and Local Government 1997–2003 ===
Name	Term of office		Party	Responsibilities	Government
Bobby Molloy	8 July 1997	9 April 2002	Progressive Democrats	Housing and Urban Renewal	25th
Dan Wallace	8 July 1997	6 June 2002	Fianna Fáil	Environmental information and awareness	25th
=== Department of the Environment, Heritage and Local Government 2003–2011 ===
Name	Term of office		Party	Responsibilities	Government
Pat "the Cope" Gallagher	18 June 2002	29 September 2004	Fianna Fáil	Environmental Protection	26th
Noel Ahern	18 June 2002	14 June 2007	Fianna Fáil	Housing and Urban Renewal	26th
Batt O'Keeffe	29 September 2004	14 June 2007	Fianna Fáil	Environmental Protection	26th
Batt O'Keeffe	20 June 2007	7 May 2008	Fianna Fáil	Housing, Urban Renewal and Developing Areas	27th
Tony Killeen	20 June 2007	7 May 2008	Fianna Fáil	Environment and Energy	27th
Máire Hoctor	9 July 2007	7 May 2008	Fianna Fáil	Older People	27th
Máire Hoctor	13 May 2008	21 April 2009	Fianna Fáil	Older People	28th
Michael Kitt	13 May 2008	21 April 2009	Fianna Fáil	Local Services	28th
Michael Finneran	13 May 2008	21 April 2009	Fianna Fáil	Housing, Urban Renewal and Developing Areas	28th
Michael Finneran	22 April 2009	9 March 2011	Fianna Fáil	Housing and Local Services	28th
Áine Brady	22 April 2009	9 March 2011	Fianna Fáil	Older People and Health Promotion	28th
Ciarán Cuffe	23 March 2010	23 January 2011	Green	Horticulture, Sustainable Travel and Planning; and Heritage	28th
=== Department of the Environment, Community and Local Government 2011–2017 ===
Name	Term of office		Party	Responsibilities	Government
Willie Penrose	9 March 2011	20 December 2011	Labour	Housing and Planning	29th
Fergus O'Dowd	10 March 2011	15 July 2014	Fine Gael	NewERA Project	29th
Jan O'Sullivan	20 December 2011	11 July 2014	Labour	Housing and Planning	29th
Paudie Coffey	15 July 2014	6 May 2016	Fine Gael	Housing, Planning and Construction 2020 Strategy	29th
=== Department of Housing, Planning, Community and Local Government 2016–2017 ===
Name	Term of office		Party	Responsibilities	Government
Damien English	19 May 2016	14 June 2017	Fine Gael	Housing and Urban Renewal	30th
Catherine Byrne	19 May 2016	14 June 2017	Fine Gael	Communities and the National Drugs Strategy	30th
=== Department of Housing, Planning and Local Government 2017–2020 ===
Name	Term of office		Party	Responsibilities	Government
John Paul Phelan	20 June 2017	27 June 2020	Fine Gael	Local Government and Electoral Reform	31st
Damien English	20 June 2017	27 June 2020	Fine Gael	Housing and Urban Development	31st
=== Department of Housing, Local Government and Heritage 2020–present ===
Name	Term of office		Party	Responsibilities	Government
Peter Burke	19 July 2020	21 December 2022	Fine Gael	Local Government and Planning	32nd
Kieran O'Donnell	21 December 2022	10 April 2024	Fine Gael	Local Government and Planning	32nd • 33rd
Malcolm Noonan	16 July 2020	23 January 2025	Green	Nature, Heritage and Electoral Reform	32nd • 33rd • 34th
Alan Dillon	10 April 2024	23 January 2025	Fine Gael	Local Government and Planning	34th
John Cummins	29 January 2025	Incumbent	Fine Gael	Local government and planning	35th
Christopher O'Sullivan	29 January 2025	Incumbent	Fianna Fáil	Nature, heritage and biodiversity	35th
Kieran O'Donnell	29 January 2025	Incumbent	Fine Gael	Housing	35th
