= Minister of State at the Department of Finance =

List of Irish Ministers of State

The minister of state at the Department of Finance is a junior ministerial post in the Department of Finance of the Government of Ireland. A minister of state does not hold cabinet rank. The position was created on 1 January 1978, replacing the position of parliamentary secretary to the minister for finance.

The current minister of state is Robert Troy, TD, who was appointed in January 2025.

== List of office-holders ==
=== Parliamentary Secretary to the Minister for Finance 1924–1978 ===
Name	Term of office		Party	Government
John M. O'Sullivan	1 December 1924	27 January 1926	Cumann na nGaedheal	2nd EC
Eamonn Duggan	10 May 1926	23 May 1927	Cumann na nGaedheal	2nd EC
Séamus Burke	24 June 1927	9 March 1932	Cumann na nGaedheal	3rd EC • 4th EC • 5th EC
Hugo Flinn	10 March 1932	28 January 1943	Fianna Fáil	6th EC • 7th EC • 8th EC • 1st • 2nd
Seán Moylan	10 February 1943	26 June 1943	Fianna Fáil	2nd
Paddy Smith	2 July 1943	31 December 1946	Fianna Fáil	3rd • 4th
Seán O'Grady	1 January 1947	18 February 1948	Fianna Fáil	4th
Michael Donnellan	18 February 1948	13 June 1951	Clann na Talmhan	5th
Patrick Beegan	13 June 1951	2 June 1954	Fianna Fáil	6th
Michael Donnellan	2 June 1954	20 March 1957	Clann na Talmhan	7th
Patrick Beegan	20 March 1957	24 February 1958	Fianna Fáil	8th
Gerald Bartley	24 February 1958	23 July 1959	Fianna Fáil	8th • 9th
Joseph Brennan	27 July 1959	15 September 1961	Fianna Fáil	9th
Donogh O'Malley	11 October 1961	21 April 1965	Fianna Fáil	10th
Jim Gibbons	21 April 1965	2 July 1969	Fianna Fáil	11th • 12th
Noel Lemass	2 July 1969	14 March 1973	Fianna Fáil	13th
Henry Kenny	14 March 1973	30 September 1975	Fine Gael	14th
Michael Begley	30 September 1975	25 May 1977	Fine Gael	14th
Pearse Wyse	5 July 1977	1 January 1978	Fianna Fáil	15th
=== Minister of State at the Department of Finance 1978–present ===
Name	Term of office		Party	Government
Pearse Wyse	1 January 1978	11 December 1979	Fianna Fáil	15th
Tom McEllistrim	13 December 1979	30 June 1981	Fianna Fáil	16th
Joseph Bermingham	30 June 1981	9 March 1982	Labour	17th
Barry Desmond	30 June 1981	9 March 1982	Labour	17th
Sylvester Barrett	23 March 1982	14 December 1982	Fianna Fáil	18th
Joseph Bermingham	16 December 1982	13 February 1986	Labour	19th
Avril Doyle	18 February 1986	21 January 1987	Fine Gael	19th
Noel Treacy	12 March 1987	12 July 1989	Fianna Fáil	20th
Brendan Daly	19 July 1989	6 February 1991	Fianna Fáil	21st
Vincent Brady	6 February 1991	15 November 1991	Fianna Fáil	21st
John O'Donoghue	15 November 1991	13 February 1992	Fianna Fáil	21st
Noel Treacy	13 February 1992	12 January 1993	Fianna Fáil	22nd
Noel Treacy	14 January 1993	15 December 1994	Fianna Fáil	23rd
Eithne FitzGerald	14 January 1993	17 November 1994	Labour	23rd
Noel Dempsey	14 January 1993	15 December 1994	Fianna Fáil	23rd
Phil Hogan	20 December 1994	10 February 1995	Fine Gael	24th
Avril Doyle	27 January 1995	26 June 1997	Fine Gael	24th
Jim Higgins	10 February 1995	24 May 1995	Fine Gael	24th
Hugh Coveney	24 May 1995	26 June 1997	Fine Gael	24th
Martin Cullen	8 July 1997	6 June 2002	Fianna Fáil	25th
Tom Parlon	19 June 2002	20 June 2007	Progressive Democrats	26th
Noel Ahern	20 June 2007	13 May 2008	Fianna Fáil	27th
Martin Mansergh	13 May 2008	9 March 2011	Fianna Fáil	28th
Dara Calleary	23 March 2010	9 March 2011	Fianna Fáil	28th
Brian Hayes	10 March 2011	23 May 2014	Fine Gael	29th
Simon Harris	15 July 2014	6 May 2016	Fine Gael	29th
Eoghan Murphy	19 May 2016	14 June 2017	Fine Gael	30th
Michael W. D'Arcy	20 June 2017	27 June 2020	Fine Gael	31st
Patrick O'Donovan	20 June 2017	27 June 2020	Fine Gael	31st
Jack Chambers	1 July 2020	15 July 2020	Fianna Fáil	32nd
Seán Fleming	15 July 2020	17 December 2022	Fianna Fáil	32nd
Jennifer Carroll MacNeill	21 December 2022	9 April 2024	Fine Gael	33rd
Neale Richmond	10 April 2024	23 January 2025	Fine Gael	34th
Robert Troy	29 January 2025	Incumbent	Fianna Fáil	35th
