= Bill Moylon =

British Second World War–era soldier (1915–2014)

- Born: William Moylon; 31 December 1915
- Died: 21 November 2014 (aged 98)
- Military career
- Allegiance: United Kingdom
- Branch: British Army
- Unit: Royal Army Ordnance Corps
- Conflicts: Second World War

William Moylon (31 December 1915 – 21 November 2014) was a soldier of the British Army who survived over three years in Japanese prisoner of war camps during the Second World War where he worked on the Burma Railway and was forced to eat lizards to survive. He later became a Chelsea Pensioner and was involved in attempts at reconciliation with the Japanese.
