= Government of the 20th Dáil =

Government of Ireland 1973 to 1977

14th government of Ireland
- Government of Ireland

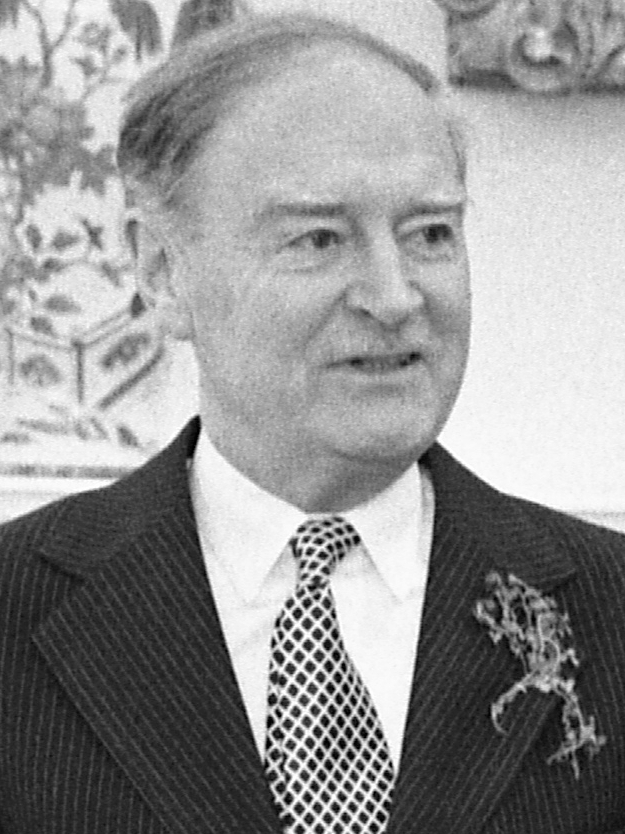
- Date formed: 14 March 1973
- Date dissolved: 5 July 1977

People and organisations
- President: Éamon de Valera (1973); Erskine H. Childers (1973–1974); Cearbhall Ó Dálaigh (1974–1976); Patrick Hillery (1976–1977)
- Taoiseach: Liam Cosgrave
- Tánaiste: Brendan Corish
- Total no. of members: 15
- Member parties: Fine Gael; Labour Party
- Status in legislature: Coalition
- Opposition party: Fianna Fáil
- Opposition leader: Jack Lynch

History
- Election: 1973 general election
- Legislature terms: 20th Dáil; 13th Seanad
- Predecessor: 13th government
- Successor: 15th government

The 14th government of Ireland (14 March 1973 – 5 July 1977) was the government of Ireland formed after the 1973 general election to the 20th Dáil held on 28 February 1973. It was a coalition government of Fine Gael and the Labour Party, known as the National Coalition, led by Liam Cosgrave as Taoiseach with Brendan Corish as Tánaiste. It was the first time either of the parties had been in government since the second inter-party government (1954–1957), when they were in coalition with Clann na Talmhan. It lasted for 4 years, 113 days. The government was widely referred to as the "cabinet of all the talents".

== Nomination of Taoiseach ==
The 20th Dáil first met on 14 March 1973. In the debate on the nomination of Taoiseach, Fianna Fáil leader and outgoing Taoiseach Jack Lynch, and Fine Gael leader Liam Cosgrave were both proposed. The nomination of Lynch was defeated with 69 votes in favour to 73 against, while the nomination of Cosgrave was carried with 72 in favour and 70 against. Cosgrave was appointed as Taoiseach by President Éamon de Valera.

14 March 1973; Nomination of Liam Cosgrave (FG) as Taoiseach; Motion proposed by Brendan Corish and seconded by Maurice E. Dockrell; Absolute majority: 73/144
Vote	Parties	Votes
Yes	Fine Gael (54), Labour Party (18)	72 / 144
No	Fianna Fáil (69), Independent Fianna Fáil (1)	70 / 144
Not voting	Ceann Comhairle (1), Independent (1)	2 / 144

== Members of the government ==
=== Appointments 14 March 1973 === After his appointment as Taoiseach by the president, Liam Cosgrave proposed the members of the government and they were approved by the Dáil. They were appointed by the president on the same day.
Office	Name	Term	Party
Taoiseach	Liam Cosgrave	1973–1977	Fine Gael
Tánaiste	Brendan Corish	1973–1977	Labour Party
Minister for Health	Brendan Corish	1973–1977	Labour Party
Minister for Social Welfare	Brendan Corish	1973–1977	Labour Party
Minister for Agriculture and Fisheries	Mark Clinton	1973–1977	Fine Gael
Minister for Defence	Paddy Donegan	1973–1976	Fine Gael
Minister for Education	Richard Burke	1973–1976	Fine Gael
Minister for Finance	Richie Ryan	1973–1977	Fine Gael
Minister for Foreign Affairs	Garret FitzGerald	1973–1977	Fine Gael
Minister for the Gaeltacht	Tom O'Donnell	1973–1977	Fine Gael
Minister for Industry and Commerce	Justin Keating	1973–1977	Labour
Minister for Justice	Patrick Cooney	1973–1977	Fine Gael
Minister for Labour	Michael O'Leary	1973–1977	Labour
Minister for Lands	Tom Fitzpatrick	1973–1976	Fine Gael
Minister for Local Government	James Tully	1973–1977	Labour
Minister for Posts and Telegraphs	Conor Cruise O'Brien	1973–1977	Labour
Minister for Transport and Power	Peter Barry	1973–1976	Fine Gael
=== Change 1 November 1973 === Assignment of new department to Minister for Finance Richie Ryan.
Office	Name	Term	Party
Minister for the Public Service	Richie Ryan	1973–1977	Fine Gael
=== Changes 2 December 1976 === Following the resignation of Richard Burke on his nomination as European Commissioner.
Office	Name	Term	Party
Minister for Education	Peter Barry	1976–1977	Fine Gael
Minister for Transport and Power	Tom Fitzpatrick	1976–1977	Fine Gael
Minister for Lands	Paddy Donegan	1976–1977	Fine Gael
Minister for Defence	Liam Cosgrave	(acting)	Fine Gael
=== Changes 16 December 1976 === Reassignment of the Department of Defence.
Office	Name	Term	Party
Minister for Defence	Oliver J. Flanagan	1976–1977	Fine Gael
=== Changes 9 February 1977 === Reorganisation of government departments.
Office	Name	Term	Party
Minister for Agriculture (Note: The Department of Agriculture and Fisheries was renamed as the Department of Agriculture on 9 February 1977.)	Mark Clinton	1973–1977	Fine Gael
Minister for Fisheries (Note: The Department of Lands was renamed as the Department of Fisheries on 9 February 1977.)	Paddy Donegan	1976–1977	Fine Gael

Changes to departments

== Attorney General ==
On 14 March 1973, Declan Costello SC was appointed by the president as Attorney General on the nomination of the Taoiseach. On 19 May 1977, Costello resigned as Attorney General on his nomination by the government for appointment as a judge of the High Court and John M. Kelly SC was appointed as Attorney General.

== Parliamentary Secretaries ==
=== Appointments 14 March 1973 === On 14 March 1973, the government appointed parliamentary secretaries on the nomination of the Taoiseach.
Name	Office	Party
John M. Kelly	Government Chief Whip	Fine Gael
John M. Kelly	Parliamentary Secretary to the Minister for Defence	Fine Gael
Michael Pat Murphy	Parliamentary Secretary to the Minister for Agriculture and Fisheries	Labour
Richard Barry	Parliamentary Secretary to the Minister for Health	Fine Gael
Henry Kenny	Parliamentary Secretary to the Minister for Finance	Fine Gael
Frank Cluskey	Parliamentary Secretary to the Minister for Social Welfare	Labour
Michael Begley	Parliamentary Secretary to the Minister for Local Government	Fine Gael
John Bruton	Parliamentary Secretary to the Minister for Education	Fine Gael
John Bruton	Parliamentary Secretary to the Minister for Industry and Commerce	Fine Gael
=== Changes 30 September 1975 === Following the death of Henry Kenny.
Name	Office	Party
Michael Begley	Parliamentary Secretary to the Minister for Finance	Fine Gael
Oliver J. Flanagan	Parliamentary Secretary to the Minister for Local Government	Fine Gael
=== Changes 17 December 1976 === Following the appointment of Oliver J. Flanagan as Minister for Defence.
Name	Office	Party
Patrick J. Reynolds	Parliamentary Secretary to the Minister for Local Government	Fine Gael
Patrick J. Reynolds	Parliamentary Secretary to the Minister for the Public Service	Fine Gael
=== Change 9 February 1977 === Transfer of functions between departments.
Michael Pat Murphy	Parliamentary Secretary to the Minister for Agriculture	Labour
Michael Pat Murphy	Parliamentary Secretary to the Minister for Fisheries	Labour

== Actions of the government ==
The National Coalition restricted the power of the National Council for Educational Awards. This forced the National Institute for Higher Education, Limerick and Thomond College of Education, Limerick to apply to the National University of Ireland for the conferring of degrees and diplomas. It removed the requirement that Irish be passed to obtain a Leaving Certificate; it also reformed the civil service by removing the requirement of knowledge in Irish and the mandatory retirement on marriage that many women faced during their civil service careers.

A free travel scheme was also introduced covering bus and rail services for all blind persons over the age of 21.

In response to the assassination of the British Ambassador to Ireland Christopher Ewart-Biggs by the Provisional IRA on 21 July, Cosgrave introduced a motion to declare a national emergency under Article 28.3.3° of the Constitution of Ireland created by an armed conflict. This was approved by the Dáil on 1 September by a vote of 70 to 65. This was followed by the introduction of the Emergency Powers Bill 1976.

President Cearbhall Ó Dálaigh referred the Emergency Powers Bill to the Supreme Court. Minister of Defence Paddy Donegan described the president as a "thundering disgrace" for this decision. The Minister apologised and privately offered to resign. Cosgrave refused to accept his resignation. On 21 October, Fianna Fáil proposed a motion in the Dáil calling on the minister to resign, which was defeated. Ó Dálaigh viewed the refusal to remove the minister as an affront to his office by the government and resigned on 22 October 1976. The following week, Fianna Fáil proposed a motion of no confidence in the government. This was countered by a motion of confidence in the government proposed by Cosgrave, which was carried on a vote of 73 to 67.
