= Government of the 19th Dáil =

Government of Ireland from 1969 to 1973

13th government of Ireland
- Government of Ireland

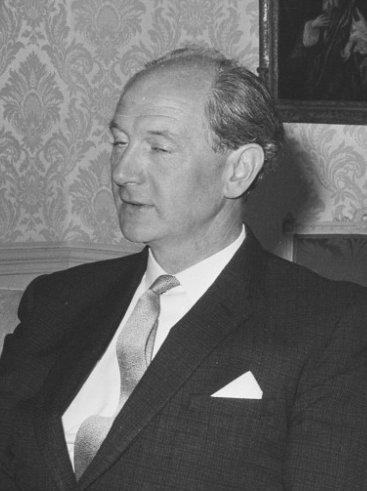
- Date formed: 2 July 1969
- Date dissolved: 14 March 1973

People and organisations
- President: Éamon de Valera
- Taoiseach: Jack Lynch
- Tánaiste: Erskine H. Childers
- Total no. of members: 14
- Member party: Fianna Fáil
- Status in legislature: Majority government
- Opposition party: Fine Gael
- Opposition leader: Liam Cosgrave

History
- Election: 1969 general election
- Legislature terms: 19th Dáil; 12th Seanad
- Predecessor: 12th government
- Successor: 14th government

The 13th government of Ireland (2 July 1969 – 14 March 1973) was the government of Ireland formed after the 1969 general election to the 19th Dáil held on 18 June 1969. It was formed by Fianna Fáil, which had been in office since the 1957 general election. This was the first election it won with Jack Lynch as its leader. It lasted for 3 years, 255 days.

== Nomination of Taoiseach ==
The 19th Dáil first met on 2 July 1969. In the debate on the nomination of Taoiseach, Fianna Fáil leader and outgoing Taoiseach Jack Lynch, the Fine Gael leader Liam Cosgrave, and the Labour Party leader Brendan Corish were each proposed. The nomination of Lynch was carried with 74 votes in favour to 66 against. Lynch was re-appointed as Taoiseach by President Éamon de Valera.

2 July 1969; Nomination of Jack Lynch (FF) as Taoiseach; Motion proposed by Frank Aiken and seconded by Johnny Geoghegan; Absolute majority: 73/144
Vote	Parties	Votes
Yes	Fianna Fáil (73), Independent (1)	74 / 144
No	Fine Gael (49), Labour Party (17)	66 / 144
Absent or Not voting	Ceann Comhairle (1), Fianna Fáil (1), Fine Gael (1)	3 / 144
Vacancy	1	1 / 144

== Members of the government ==
After his appointment as Taoiseach by the president, Jack Lynch proposed the members of the government and they were approved by the Dáil. They were appointed by the president on the same day.

Office	Name	Term
Taoiseach	Jack Lynch	1969–1973
Tánaiste	Erskine H. Childers	1969–1973
Minister for Health	Erskine H. Childers	1969–1973
Minister for Agriculture	Neil Blaney	1969–1970
Minister for Defence	Jim Gibbons	1969–1970
Minister for Education	Pádraig Faulkner	1969–1973
Minister for Finance	Charles Haughey	1969–1970
Minister for External Affairs (Note: The Department of External Affairs was renamed the Department of Foreign Affairs on 3 March 1971.)	Patrick Hillery	1969–1973
Minister for the Gaeltacht	George Colley	1969–1973
Minister for Industry and Commerce	George Colley	1969–1970
Minister for Justice	Mícheál Ó Móráin	1969–1970
Minister for Labour	Joseph Brennan	1969–1973
Minister for Lands	Seán Flanagan	1969–1973
Minister for Local Government	Kevin Boland	1969–1970
Minister for Social Welfare	Kevin Boland	1969–1970
Minister for Posts and Telegraphs	Patrick Lalor	1969–1973
Minister for Transport and Power	Brian Lenihan	1969–1973
=== Change 7 May 1970 === Mícheál Ó Móráin was in hospital and was asked to resign on 4 May 1970.
Office	Name	Term
Minister for Justice	Desmond O'Malley	1970–1973
=== Changes 9 May 1970 === Due to the Arms Crisis, Charles Haughey and Neil Blaney were dismissed on 6 May 1970 when they refused to resign. Kevin Boland resigned from the government.
Office	Name	Term
Minister for Agriculture	Jim Gibbons	1970–1973
Minister for Defence	Jerry Cronin	1970–1973
Minister for Finance	George Colley	1970–1973
Minister for Industry and Commerce	Patrick Lalor	1970–1973
Minister for Local Government	Bobby Molloy	1970–1973
Minister for Posts and Telegraphs	Gerry Collins	1970–1973
Minister for Social Welfare	Joseph Brennan	1970–1973
=== Changes 3 January 1973 === Michael O'Kennedy was appointed to government on 14 December 1972. In January 1973 Patrick Hillery was appointed as Irelands's first European Commissioner.
Office	Name	Term
Minister for Foreign Affairs	Brian Lenihan	1973
Minister for Transport and Power	Michael O'Kennedy	1973

== Parliamentary Secretaries ==
On 9 July 1969, the Taoiseach announced the appointment by the Government of the Parliamentary Secretaries on his nomination.

Name	Office
Desmond O'Malley	Government Chief Whip; Parliamentary Secretary to the Minister for Defence
Paudge Brennan	Parliamentary Secretary to the Minister for Local Government
Johnny Geoghegan	Parliamentary Secretary to the Minister for Social Welfare
Noel Lemass	Parliamentary Secretary to the Minister for Finance
Jerry Cronin	Parliamentary Secretary to the Minister for Agriculture and Fisheries
Bobby Molloy	Parliamentary Secretary to the Minister for Education
Gerry Collins	Parliamentary Secretary to the Minister for Industry and Commerce; Parliamentary Secretary to the Minister for the Gaeltacht
=== Changes 8 May 1970 === Following the appointment of Desmond O'Malley to government.
Name	Office
David Andrews	Government Chief Whip; Parliamentary Secretary to the Minister for Defence
=== Changes 9 May 1970 === Following the resignation of Paudge Brennan on 8 May and the appointment of Jerry Cronin, Bobby Molloy and Gerry Collins to government on 9 May.
Name	Office
Liam Cunningham	Parliamentary Secretary to the Minister for Local Government
Jackie Fahey	Parliamentary Secretary to the Minister for Agriculture and Fisheries
Michael F. Kitt	Parliamentary Secretary to the Minister for the Gaeltacht
Michael O'Kennedy	Parliamentary Secretary to the Minister for Education
=== Changes 3 January 1973 === Following the appointment of Michael O'Kennedy to government.
Name	Office
Jim Tunney	Parliamentary Secretary to the Minister for Education

== Arms Crisis ==
Following the dismissal of ministers, a motion of confidence in the government was proposed by Jack Lynch. It was approved on a vote of 72 to 64.

After the trial, Lynch placed a further motion of confidence in the government, in response to an opposition motion. This was approved on a vote of 74 to 67.

== Foreign affairs ==
The government signed the Treaty of Accession to the European Economic Community on 22 January 1972. After a referendum held on 10 May, a constitutional amendment allowing Ireland to become a member of the European Communities was approved with the support of 83.1% of votes cast. Ireland, Denmark and the United Kingdom became members of the EEC on 1 January 1973.
