= Oscar Traynor =

Irish republican and politician (1886–1963)

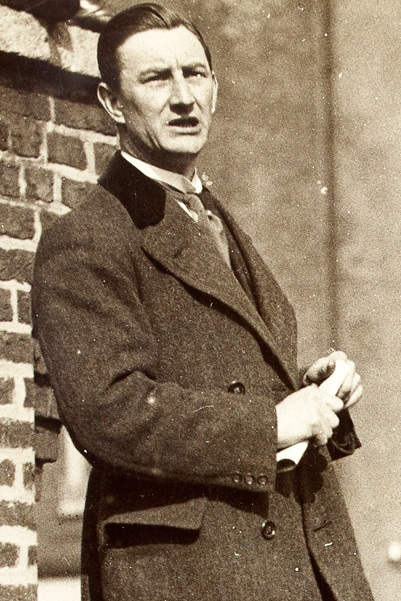
- Traynor in 1922

Minister for Justice
- In office 20 March 1957 – 11 October 1961
- Taoiseach: Éamon de Valera; Seán Lemass
- Preceded by: James Everett
- Succeeded by: Charles Haughey

Minister for Defence
- In office 13 June 1951 – 2 June 1954
- Taoiseach: Éamon de Valera
- Preceded by: Seán Mac Eoin
- Succeeded by: Seán Mac Eoin
- In office 8 September 1939 – 18 February 1948
- Taoiseach: Éamon de Valera
- Preceded by: Frank Aiken
- Succeeded by: Thomas F. O'Higgins

Minister for Posts and Telegraphs
- In office 11 November 1936 – 8 September 1939
- Taoiseach: Éamon de Valera
- Preceded by: Gerald Boland
- Succeeded by: Thomas Derrig

Parliamentary Secretary
- 1936: Defence

Teachta Dála
- In office July1937 – October 1961
- Constituency: Dublin North-East
- In office February 1932 – July 1937
- In office March 1925 – September 1927
- Constituency: Dublin North

Personal details
- Born: 21 March 1886 Dublin, Ireland
- Died: 14 December 1963 (aged 77) Dublin, Ireland
- Party: Fianna Fáil (1927–1963); Sinn Féin (1925–1927)
- Spouse: Anne Coyne (m. 1918)
- Children: 3

Military service
- Allegiance: Irish Republican Brotherhood; Irish Volunteers; Irish Republican Army; Anti-Treaty IRA
- Years of service: 1913–1922
- Rank: Commandant general
- Battles/wars: Easter Rising; Irish War of Independence; Irish Civil War

Oscar Traynor (21 March 1886 – 14 December 1963) was an Irish republican and Fianna Fáil politician who served as Minister for Justice from 1957 to 1961, Minister for Defence from 1939 to 1948 and 1951 to 1954, Minister for Posts and Telegraphs from 1936 to 1939 and Parliamentary Secretary to the Minister for Defence from June 1936 to November 1936. He was a Teachta Dála (TD) from 1925 to 1927 and 1932 to 1961.

He was also involved with association football, being the president of the Football Association of Ireland (FAI) from 1948 until 1963.

== Life ==
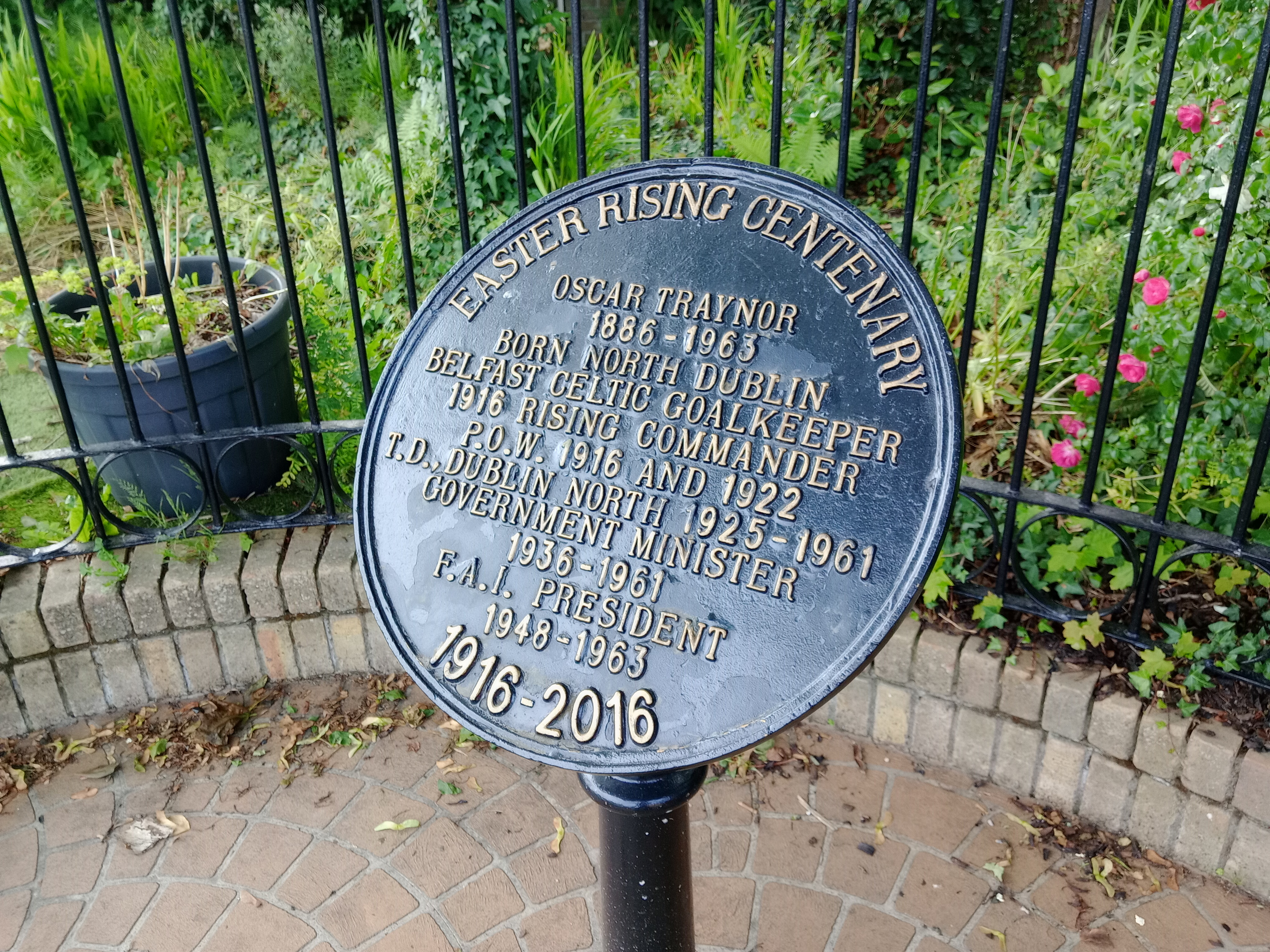
Oscar Traynor Rising centenerary plaque in Woodlawn, Dublin

Oscar Traynor was born on 21 March 1886 in 32 Upper Abbey Street, Dublin, to Patrick Traynor, bookseller, and his wife Maria Traynor (née Clarke). He was educated by at St Mary's Place, Christian Brothers school. In 1899, he was apprenticed to John Long, a famous wood carver. Traynor later qualified as a compositor.

As a young man, he was a noted footballer and toured Europe as a goalkeeper for Belfast Celtic F.C., with whom he played from 1910 to 1912. Traynor rejected claims soccer was a foreign sport calling it "a Celtic game, pure and simple, having its roots in the Highlands of Scotland."

Traynor joined the Irish Volunteers and took part in the Easter Rising in 1916, being the leader of the Metropole Hotel garrison. Following this he was interned in Wales and released in late 1916. During the Irish War of Independence, he was brigadier of the Dublin Brigade of the Irish Republican Army and led the attack on The Custom House in 1921. Traynor led a 12-man squad in an ambush on the West Kent Regiment at Claude Road, Drumcondra on 16 June 1921 when the Thompson submachine gun was fired for the first time in action. Three British soldiers were injured in that attack, one seriously. Later Traynor was promoted to command the IRA's 1st Eastern Division.

When the Irish Civil War broke out in June 1922, Traynor took the Anti-Treaty IRA side. The Dublin Brigade was split, however, with many of its members following Michael Collins in taking the pro-Treaty side. During the Battle of Dublin he was in charge of the Barry's Hotel garrison, before making their escape. He organised guerrilla activity in south Dublin and County Wicklow, before being captured by Free State troops in September. He was then imprisoned for the remainder of the war.

On 11 March 1925, he was elected to Dáil Éireann in a by-election as a Sinn Féin TD for the Dublin North constituency, though he did not take his seat due to the abstentionist policy of Sinn Féin. He was re-elected as one of eight members for Dublin North in the June 1927 general election but just one of six Sinn Féin TDs. Once again, he did not take his seat. Traynor did not contest the second general election called that year but declared his support for Fianna Fáil. He stood again in the 1932 general election and was elected as a Fianna Fáil TD for Dublin North.

In 1936, he was first appointed to the Cabinet as Minister for Posts and Telegraphs. In September 1939, Traynor was appointed Minister for Defence and held the portfolio until February 1948. In 1948, he became president of the Football Association of Ireland, a position he held until his death. He served as Minister for Defence in several Fianna Fáil governments and as Minister for Justice, where he was undermined by his junior minister, and later Taoiseach, Charles Haughey, before he retired in 1961.

Traynor died on 15 December 1963 in Dublin at the age of 77.

He has a road named in his memory, running from the Malahide Road through Coolock to Santry in Dublin's northern suburbs.

Political offices
New office	Parliamentary Secretary to the Minister for Defence; 1936	Succeeded by Seán O'Grady
Preceded by Gerald Boland	Minister for Posts and Telegraphs; 1936–1939	Succeeded by Thomas Derrig
Preceded by Frank Aiken	Minister for Defence; 1939–1948	Succeeded by Thomas F. O'Higgins
Preceded by Seán Mac Eoin	Minister for Defence; 1951–1954	Succeeded by Seán Mac Eoin
Preceded by James Everett	Minister for Justice; 1957–1961	Succeeded by Charles Haughey

Dáil	Election	Deputy (Party)	Deputy (Party)	Deputy (Party)	Deputy (Party)	Deputy (Party)	Deputy (Party)	Deputy (Party)	Deputy (Party)
4th	1923	Alfie Byrne (Ind.)	Francis Cahill (CnaG)	Margaret Collins-O'Driscoll (CnaG)	Seán McGarry (CnaG)	William Hewat (BP)	Richard Mulcahy (CnaG)	Seán T. O'Kelly (Rep)	Ernie O'Malley (Rep)
4th	1925 by-election	Alfie Byrne (Ind.)	Patrick Leonard (CnaG)	Margaret Collins-O'Driscoll (CnaG)	Oscar Traynor (Rep)	William Hewat (BP)	Richard Mulcahy (CnaG)	Seán T. O'Kelly (Rep)	Ernie O'Malley (Rep)
5th	1927 (Jun)	Alfie Byrne (Ind.)	John Byrne (CnaG)	Margaret Collins-O'Driscoll (CnaG)	Oscar Traynor (SF)	Denis Cullen (Lab)	Richard Mulcahy (CnaG)	Seán T. O'Kelly (FF)	Kathleen Clarke (FF)
6th	1927 (Sep)	Alfie Byrne (Ind.)	John Byrne (CnaG)	Margaret Collins-O'Driscoll (CnaG)	Patrick Leonard (CnaG)	James Larkin (IWL)	Richard Mulcahy (CnaG)	Seán T. O'Kelly (FF)	Eamonn Cooney (FF)
6th	1928 by-election	Alfie Byrne (Ind.)	John Byrne (CnaG)	Margaret Collins-O'Driscoll (CnaG)	Patrick Leonard (CnaG)	Vincent Rice (CnaG)	Richard Mulcahy (CnaG)	Seán T. O'Kelly (FF)	Eamonn Cooney (FF)
6th	1929 by-election	Thomas F. O'Higgins (CnaG)	John Byrne (CnaG)	Margaret Collins-O'Driscoll (CnaG)	Patrick Leonard (CnaG)	Vincent Rice (CnaG)	Richard Mulcahy (CnaG)	Seán T. O'Kelly (FF)	Eamonn Cooney (FF)
7th	1932	Alfie Byrne (Ind.)	John Byrne (CnaG)	Margaret Collins-O'Driscoll (CnaG)	Oscar Traynor (FF)	Cormac Breathnach (FF)	Richard Mulcahy (CnaG)	Seán T. O'Kelly (FF)	Eamonn Cooney (FF)
8th	1933	Alfie Byrne (Ind.)	Patrick Belton (CnaG)	Vincent Rice (CnaG)	Oscar Traynor (FF)	Cormac Breathnach (FF)	Richard Mulcahy (CnaG)	Seán T. O'Kelly (FF)	Eamonn Cooney (FF)
9th	1937	Constituency abolished. See Dublin North-East and Dublin North-West							

Dáil	Election	Deputy (Party)	Deputy (Party)	Deputy (Party)	Deputy (Party)
22nd	1981	Ray Burke (FF)	John Boland (FG)	Nora Owen (FG)	3 seats 1981–1992
23rd	1982 (Feb)	Ray Burke (FF)	John Boland (FG)	Nora Owen (FG)	3 seats 1981–1992
24th	1982 (Nov)	Ray Burke (FF)	John Boland (FG)	Nora Owen (FG)	3 seats 1981–1992
25th	1987	Ray Burke (FF)	John Boland (FG)	G. V. Wright (FF)	3 seats 1981–1992
26th	1989	Ray Burke (FF)	Nora Owen (FG)	Seán Ryan (Lab)	3 seats 1981–1992
27th	1992	Ray Burke (FF)	Nora Owen (FG)	Seán Ryan (Lab)	Trevor Sargent (GP)
28th	1997	Ray Burke (FF)	Nora Owen (FG)	G. V. Wright (FF)	Trevor Sargent (GP)
28th	1998 by-election	Seán Ryan (Lab)	Nora Owen (FG)	G. V. Wright (FF)	Trevor Sargent (GP)
29th	2002	Seán Ryan (Lab)	Jim Glennon (FF)	G. V. Wright (FF)	Trevor Sargent (GP)
30th	2007	James Reilly (FG)	Michael Kennedy (FF)	Darragh O'Brien (FF)	Trevor Sargent (GP)
31st	2011	James Reilly (FG)	Alan Farrell (FG)	Brendan Ryan (Lab)	Clare Daly (SP)
32nd	2016	Constituency abolished. See Dublin Fingal			

Dáil	Election	Deputy (Party)	Deputy (Party)	Deputy (Party)	Deputy (Party)	Deputy (Party)
9th	1937	Alfie Byrne (Ind.)	Oscar Traynor (FF)	James Larkin (Ind.)	3 seats 1937–1948	
10th	1938	Alfie Byrne (Ind.)	Oscar Traynor (FF)	Richard Mulcahy (FG)	3 seats 1937–1948	
11th	1943	Alfie Byrne (Ind.)	Oscar Traynor (FF)	James Larkin (Lab)	3 seats 1937–1948	
12th	1944	Alfie Byrne (Ind.)	Oscar Traynor (FF)	Harry Colley (FF)	3 seats 1937–1948	
13th	1948	Alfie Byrne (Ind.)	Oscar Traynor (FF)	Harry Colley (FF)	Jack Belton (FG)	Peadar Cowan (CnaP)
14th	1951	Alfie Byrne (Ind.)	Oscar Traynor (FF)	Harry Colley (FF)	Jack Belton (FG)	Peadar Cowan (Ind.)
15th	1954	Alfie Byrne (Ind.)	Oscar Traynor (FF)	Harry Colley (FF)	Jack Belton (FG)	Denis Larkin (Lab)
15th	1956 by-election	Patrick Byrne (FG)	Oscar Traynor (FF)	Harry Colley (FF)	Jack Belton (FG)	Denis Larkin (Lab)
16th	1957	Patrick Byrne (FG)	Oscar Traynor (FF)	Charles Haughey (FF)	Jack Belton (FG)	Denis Larkin (Lab)
17th	1961	Patrick Byrne (FG)	George Colley (FF)	Charles Haughey (FF)	Jack Belton (FG)	Eugene Timmons (FF)
17th	1963 by-election	Patrick Byrne (FG)	George Colley (FF)	Charles Haughey (FF)	Paddy Belton (FG)	Eugene Timmons (FF)
18th	1965	Patrick Byrne (FG)	George Colley (FF)	Charles Haughey (FF)	Paddy Belton (FG)	Denis Larkin (Lab)
19th	1969	Conor Cruise O'Brien (Lab)	Eugene Timmons (FF)	Charles Haughey (FF)	Paddy Belton (FG)	4 seats 1969–1977
20th	1973	Conor Cruise O'Brien (Lab)	Eugene Timmons (FF)	Charles Haughey (FF)	Paddy Belton (FG)	4 seats 1969–1977
21st	1977	Constituency abolished				

Dáil	Election	Deputy (Party)	Deputy (Party)	Deputy (Party)	Deputy (Party)
22nd	1981	Michael Woods (FF)	Liam Fitzgerald (FF)	Seán Dublin Bay Rockall Loftus (Ind.)	Michael Joe Cosgrave (FG)
23rd	1982 (Feb)	Michael Woods (FF)	Maurice Manning (FG)	Ned Brennan (FF)	Michael Joe Cosgrave (FG)
24th	1982 (Nov)	Michael Woods (FF)	Maurice Manning (FG)	Liam Fitzgerald (FF)	Michael Joe Cosgrave (FG)
25th	1987	Michael Woods (FF)	Pat McCartan (WP)	Liam Fitzgerald (FF)	Michael Joe Cosgrave (FG)
26th	1989	Michael Woods (FF)	Pat McCartan (WP)	Liam Fitzgerald (FF)	Michael Joe Cosgrave (FG)
27th	1992	Michael Woods (FF)	Tommy Broughan (Lab)	Liam Fitzgerald (FF)	Seán Kenny (Lab)
28th	1997	Michael Woods (FF)	Tommy Broughan (Lab)	Martin Brady (FF)	Michael Joe Cosgrave (FG)
29th	2002	Michael Woods (FF)	Tommy Broughan (Lab)	Martin Brady (FF)	3 seats from 2002
30th	2007	Michael Woods (FF)	Tommy Broughan (Lab)	Terence Flanagan (FG)	3 seats from 2002
31st	2011	Seán Kenny (Lab)	Tommy Broughan (Lab)	Terence Flanagan (FG)	3 seats from 2002
32nd	2016	Constituency abolished. See Dublin Bay North			
