= Seán Moylan =

Irish republican and politician (1889–1957)

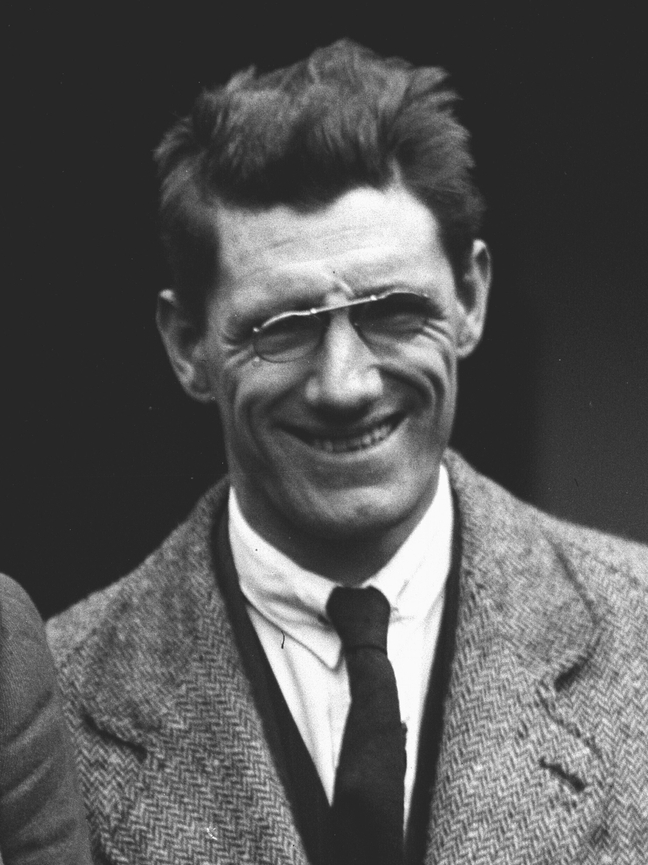
- Moylan in 1922

Minister for Agriculture
- In office 16 May 1957 – 16 November 1957
- Taoiseach: Éamon de Valera
- Preceded by: Frank Aiken
- Succeeded by: Frank Aiken

Minister for Education
- In office 13 June 1951 – 2 June 1954
- Taoiseach: Éamon de Valera
- Preceded by: Richard Mulcahy
- Succeeded by: Richard Mulcahy

Minister for Lands
- In office 2 July 1943 – 18 February 1948
- Taoiseach: Éamon de Valera
- Preceded by: Thomas Derrig
- Succeeded by: Joseph Blowick

Parliamentary Secretary
- 1943: Finance
- 1937–1943: Industry and Commerce

Senator
- In office 12 May 1957 – 16 November 1957
- Constituency: Nominated by the Taoiseach

Teachta Dála
- In office February 1932 – March 1957
- Constituency: Cork North
- In office May 1921 – August 1923
- Constituency: Cork Mid, North, South, South East and West

Personal details
- Born: 19 November 1889 Kilmallock, County Limerick, Ireland
- Died: 16 November 1957 (aged 67) Dublin, Ireland
- Party: Fianna Fáil
- Spouse: Nora Murphy (m. 1922)
- Children: 5

Military service
- Branch/service: Irish Volunteers; Irish Republican Army; Anti-Treaty IRA
- Rank: Commandant-general
- Battles/wars: Irish War of Independence; Irish Civil War

Seán Moylan (19 November 1889 – 16 November 1957) was an Irish republican who was a senior officer in the Irish Republican Army and later a Fianna Fáil politician. He served as Minister for Agriculture from May 1957 to November 1957, Minister for Education from 1951 to 1954, Minister for Lands from 1943 to 1948, Parliamentary Secretary to the Minister for Finance from February 1943 to June 1943 and Parliamentary Secretary to the Minister for Industry and Commerce from 1937 to 1943. He became a Senator from May 1957 to November 1957, after being nominated by the Taoiseach. He was also elected as a Teachta Dála (TD) from 1921 to 1923 and from 1932 to 1957.

== Biography ==
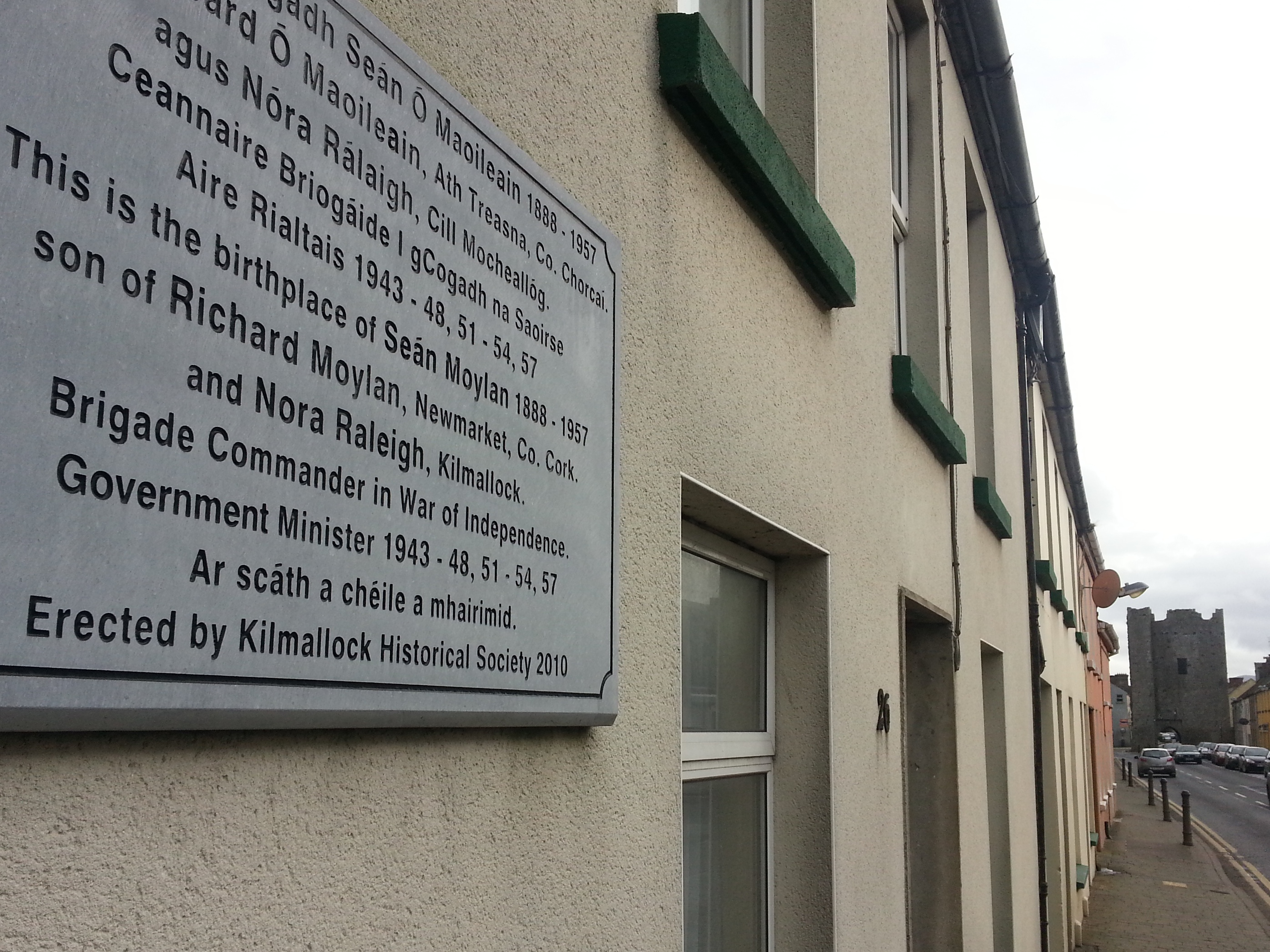
Moylan's home, Kilmallock, County Limerick

Moylan was born in Kilmallock, County Limerick, in 1889. He was educated locally and was from a strong republican background which saw him join the Gaelic League and the Gaelic Athletic Association (GAA). He trained as a carpenter's apprentice and worked in Dublin. In 1914, Moylan joined the Kilmallock division of the Irish Volunteers but left in 1914, when his apprenticeship finished and he moved to set up a business in Newmarket, County Cork. There he joined the local division of the Volunteers again.

Following reorganisation after the 1916 Easter Rising, Moylan was appointed captain of the Newmarket division. During the Irish War of Independence he was commandant of the Cork No.2 Battalion of the Irish Republican Army and led the active service unit in the north of County Cork during 1920. On 5 March 1921 Moylan led an ambush against a British convoy at Clonbanin (see Clonbanin ambush) in which Colonel Commandant Hanway Robert Cumming and other British troops were killed. He had risen to the rank of Officer Commanding the Cork No.2 Brigade when he was captured and interned in Spike Island in May 1921. Moylan was elected to Dáil Éireann, while in prison, as a Sinn Féin TD to the Second Dáil. He was released in August 1921 to attend the Dáil. Moylan opposed the Anglo-Irish Treaty and left the Dáil with the other anti-treaty deputies following its ratification.

Moylan fought on the republican side in the Irish Civil War. The north and west Cork area proved to be among the last to fall to the pro-treaty forces. He was Director of Operations of the Anti-Treaty forces and a member of the IRA Executive, holding the rank of commandant-general. In 1926, Moylan originally opposed the setting up of Fianna Fáil but joined the new party later that year. He was elected a Fianna Fáil TD for Cork North at the 1932 general election. He was appointed a Parliamentary Secretary in 1937. He joined to cabinet in 1943 as Minister for Lands. Moylan remained in this office until 1948 when the party went into opposition. He served as Minister for Education from 1951 until 1954, when Fianna Fáil lost power again. Moylan lost his seat at the 1957 general election but was nominated by the Taoiseach to Seanad Éireann as a senator later that year. He was later appointed to the cabinet as Minister for Agriculture, making him the first senator to be appointed a government minister.

Seán Moylan died suddenly on 16 November 1957. He was buried in Kiskeam, County Cork. Speaking at an event commemorating the 50th anniversary of his death, Brian Lenihan Jnr suggested that Moylan was "one of the most outstanding military leaders in the War of Independence".

== In popular culture ==
Moylan is mentioned in the Irish folk ballad "The Galtee Mountain Boy", along with Dinny Lacey, Dan Breen and Seán Hogan. The song, written by Patsy Halloran, recalls some of the travels of a "Flying column" from Tipperary as they fought during the Irish War of Independence and later against the pro-Treaty side during the Irish Civil War.

== Gallery ==
British Army military intelligence file for John Moylan

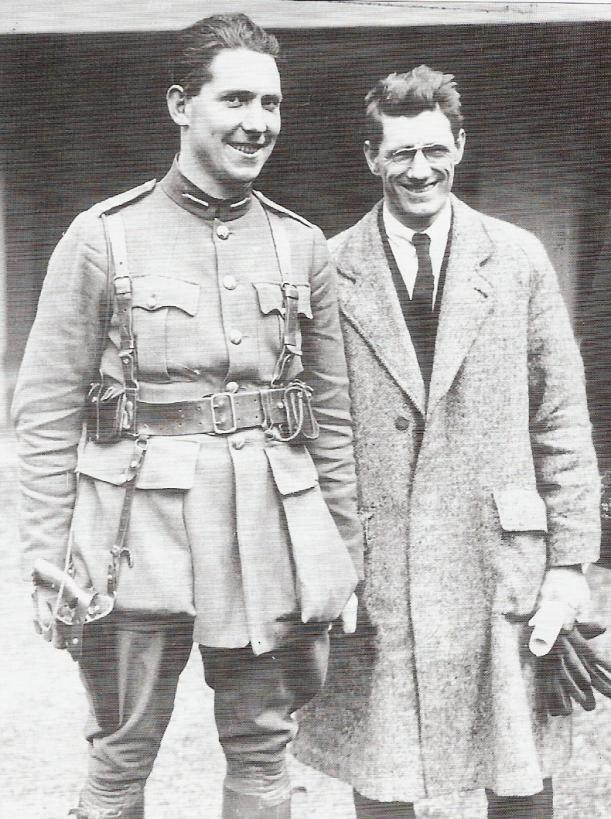
Seán Mac Eoin and Seán Moylan in 1922

Political offices
New office	Parliamentary Secretary to the Minister for Industry and Commerce; 1937–1943	Succeeded by Seán O'Grady
Preceded by Hugo Flinn	Parliamentary Secretary to the Minister for Finance; Feb.–Jun. 1943	Succeeded by Paddy Smith
Preceded by Thomas Derrig	Minister for Lands; 1943–1948	Succeeded by Joseph Blowick
Preceded by Richard Mulcahy	Minister for Education; 1951–1954	Succeeded by Richard Mulcahy
Preceded by Frank Aiken	Minister for Agriculture; May–Nov. 1957	Succeeded by Frank Aiken

Dáil	Election	Deputy (Party)	Deputy (Party)	Deputy (Party)	Deputy (Party)	Deputy (Party)	Deputy (Party)	Deputy (Party)	Deputy (Party)
2nd	1921	Seán MacSwiney (SF)	Seán Nolan (SF)	Seán Moylan (SF)	Daniel Corkery (SF)	Michael Collins (SF)	Seán Hales (SF)	Seán Hayes (SF)	Patrick O'Keeffe (SF)
3rd	1922	Michael Bradley (Lab)	Thomas Nagle (Lab)	Seán Moylan (AT-SF)	Daniel Corkery (AT-SF)	Michael Collins (PT-SF)	Seán Hales (PT-SF)	Seán Hayes (PT-SF)	Daniel Vaughan (FP)
4th	1923	Constituency abolished. See Cork North and Cork West							

Dáil	Election	Deputy (Party)	Deputy (Party)	Deputy (Party)	Deputy (Party)
4th	1923	Daniel Corkery (Rep)	Daniel Vaughan (FP)	Thomas Nagle (Lab)	3 seats 1923–1937
5th	1927 (Jun)	Daniel Corkery (Ind.)	Daniel Vaughan (FP)	Timothy Quill (Lab)	3 seats 1923–1937
6th	1927 (Sep)	Daniel Corkery (FF)	Daniel Vaughan (FP)	Daniel O'Leary (CnaG)	3 seats 1923–1937
7th	1932	Seán Moylan (FF)	Daniel Vaughan (FP)	Daniel O'Leary (CnaG)	3 seats 1923–1937
8th	1933	Seán Moylan (FF)	Daniel Corkery (FF)	Daniel O'Leary (CnaG)	3 seats 1923–1937
9th	1937	Seán Moylan (FF)	Patrick Daly (FG)	Timothy Linehan (FG)	Con Meaney (FF)
10th	1938	Seán Moylan (FF)	Patrick Daly (FG)	Timothy Linehan (FG)	Con Meaney (FF)
11th	1943	Seán Moylan (FF)	Patrick Halliden (CnaT)	Timothy Linehan (FG)	Leo Skinner (FF)
12th	1944	Seán Moylan (FF)	Patrick Halliden (CnaT)	Patrick McAuliffe (Lab)	Leo Skinner (FF)
13th	1948	Seán Moylan (FF)	Patrick Halliden (CnaT)	Patrick McAuliffe (Lab)	3 seats 1948–1961
14th	1951	Seán Moylan (FF)	Denis O'Sullivan (FG)	Patrick McAuliffe (Lab)	3 seats 1948–1961
15th	1954	Seán Moylan (FF)	Denis O'Sullivan (FG)	Patrick McAuliffe (Lab)	3 seats 1948–1961
16th	1957	Batt Donegan (FF)	Denis O'Sullivan (FG)	Patrick McAuliffe (Lab)	3 seats 1948–1961
17th	1961	Constituency abolished. See Cork North-East and Cork Mid			
