= Minister for Housing, Local Government and Heritage =

Irish government cabinet minister

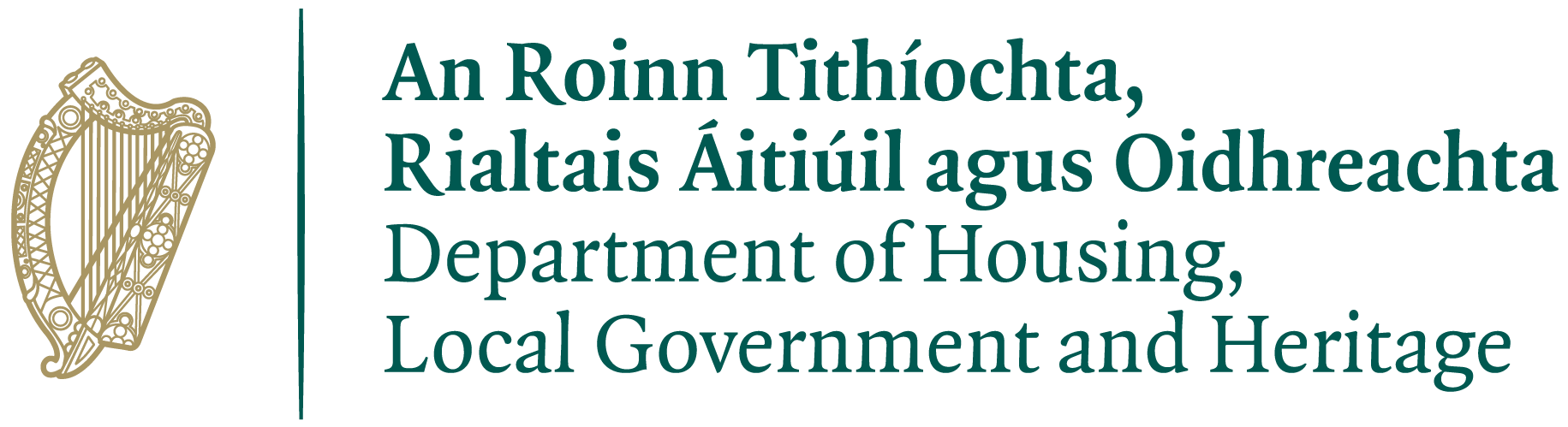

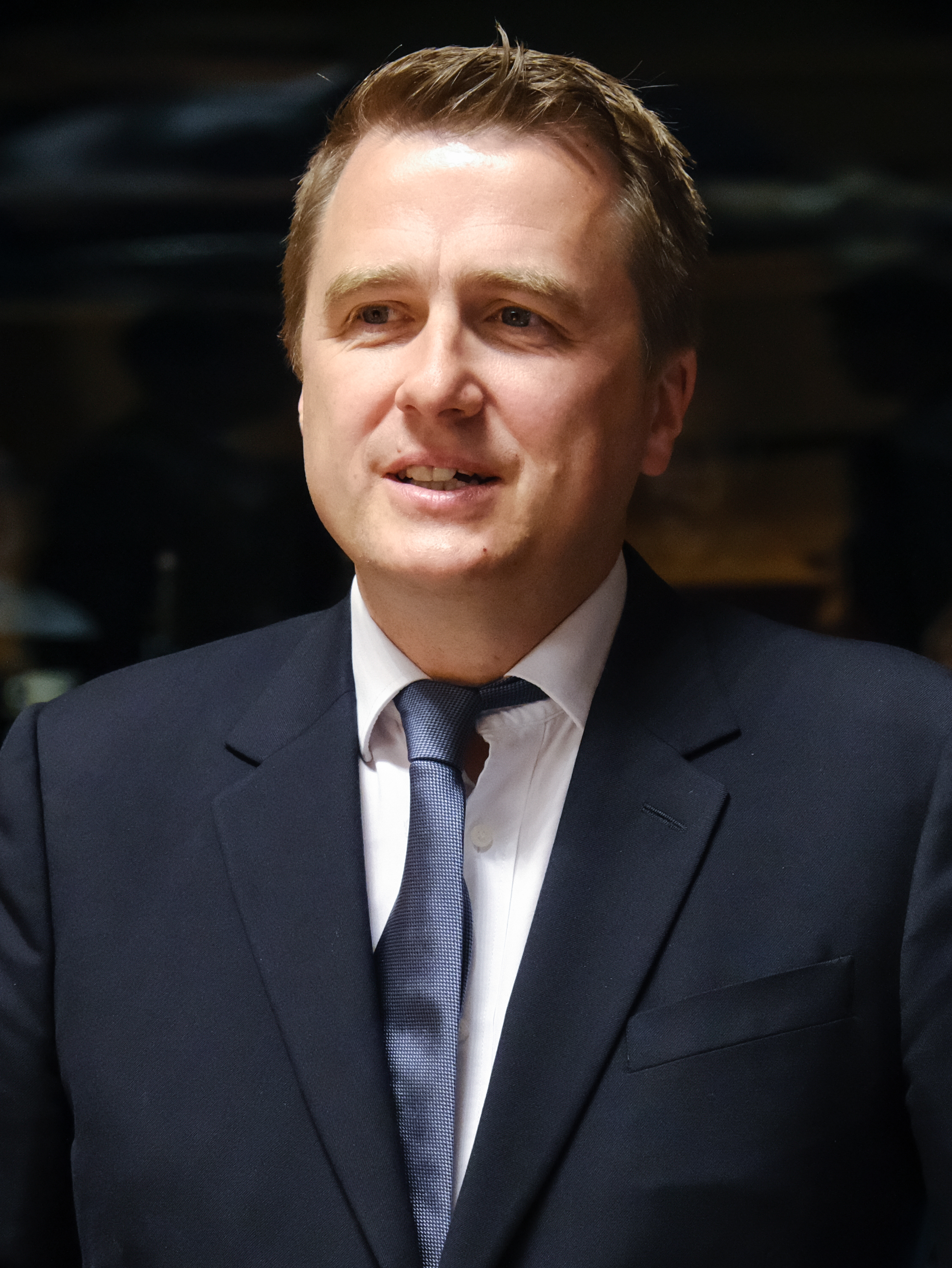
- Incumbent; James Browne since 23 January 2025
- Department of Housing, Local Government and Heritage
- Type: Housing minister; Culture minister
- Status: Cabinet minister
- Member of: Government of Ireland; Council of the European Union; Dáil Éireann
- Reports to: Taoiseach
- Seat: Dublin, Ireland
- Nominator: Taoiseach
- Appointer: President of Ireland (on the advice of the Taoiseach)
- Inaugural holder: W. T. Cosgrave as Minister for Local Government
- Formation: 2 April 1919
- Salary: €210,750 (2025) (including €115,953 TD salary)
- Website: Official website

The minister for housing, local government and heritage (Irish: An tAire Tithíochta, Rialtais Áitiúil agus Oidhreachta) is a senior minister in the Government of Ireland and leads the Department of Housing, Local Government and Heritage.

The minister for housing, local government and heritage since January 2025 is James Browne, TD.

He is assisted by three ministers of state:

- John Cummins, TD – Minister of State for local government and planning
- Christopher O'Sullivan, TD – Minister of State for nature, heritage and biodiversity
- Kieran O'Donnell, TD – Minister of State for housing

== Overview ==
The minister is responsible for, among other matters:

- housing;
- local authorities and related services;
- the supervision of elections, including general elections and presidential elections.

== List of office-holders ==
Denotes acting Minister

=== Minister for Local Government 1919–1924 ===
Name	Term of office		Party	Government(s) (Note: Before 1937: DM – Dáil Ministry; PG – Provisional Government; EC – Executive Council.)
W. T. Cosgrave	2 April 1919	9 September 1922	Sinn Féin	2nd DM • 3rd DM • 4th DM • 1st PG
Ernest Blythe	30 August 1922	15 October 1923	Sinn Féin (Pro-Treaty)	2nd PG • 5th DM • 1st EC • 2nd EC
Séamus Burke	15 October 1923	2 June 1924	Cumann na nGaedheal	2nd EC
=== Minister for Local Government and Public Health 1924–1947 ===
Name	Term of office		Party	Government(s)
Séamus Burke	2 June 1924	23 June 1927	Cumann na nGaedheal	2nd EC
Richard Mulcahy	23 June 1927	9 March 1932	Cumann na nGaedheal	3rd EC • 4th EC • 5th EC
Seán T. O'Kelly	9 March 1932	8 September 1939	Fianna Fáil	6th EC • 7th EC • 8th EC • 1st • 2nd
P. J. Ruttledge	8 September 1939	14 August 1941	Fianna Fáil	2nd
Éamon de Valera (acting)	15 August 1941	18 August 1941	Fianna Fáil	2nd
Seán MacEntee	18 August 1941	22 January 1947	Fianna Fáil	2nd • 3rd • 4th
=== Minister for Local Government 1947–1977 ===
Name	Term of office		Party	Government(s)
Seán MacEntee	22 January 1947	18 February 1948	Fianna Fáil	4th
Timothy J. Murphy	18 February 1948	29 April 1949	Labour	5th
William Norton (acting)	3 May 1949	11 May 1949	Labour	5th
Michael Keyes	11 May 1949	13 June 1951	Labour	5th
Paddy Smith (1st time)	13 June 1951	2 June 1954	Fianna Fáil	6th
Patrick O'Donnell	2 June 1954	20 March 1957	Fine Gael	7th
Paddy Smith (2nd time)	20 March 1957	27 November 1957	Fianna Fáil	8th
Neil Blaney	27 November 1957	10 November 1966	Fianna Fáil	8th • 9th • 10th • 11th
Kevin Boland	10 November 1966	7 May 1970	Fianna Fáil	12th • 13th
Bobby Molloy	9 May 1970	14 March 1973	Fianna Fáil	13th
James Tully	14 March 1973	5 July 1977	Labour	14th
=== Minister for the Environment 1977–1997 ===
Name	Term of office		Party	Government(s)
Sylvester Barrett	5 July 1977	15 October 1980	Fianna Fáil	15th • 16th
Ray Burke (1st time)	15 October 1980	30 June 1981	Fianna Fáil	16th
Peter Barry	30 June 1981	9 March 1982	Fine Gael	17th
Ray Burke (2nd time)	9 March 1982	14 December 1982	Fianna Fáil	18th
Dick Spring	14 December 1982	13 December 1983	Labour	19th
Liam Kavanagh	13 December 1983	14 February 1986	Labour	19th
John Boland	14 February 1986	10 March 1987	Fine Gael	19th
Pádraig Flynn	10 March 1987	8 November 1991	Fianna Fáil	20th • 21st
John Wilson (acting)	8 November 1991	14 November 1991	Fianna Fáil	21st
Rory O'Hanlon	14 November 1991	14 February 1992	Fianna Fáil	21st
Michael Smith	14 February 1992	14 December 1994	Fianna Fáil	22nd • 23rd
Brendan Howlin	14 December 1994	26 June 1997	Labour	24th
=== Minister for Environment and Local Government 1997–2002 ===
Name	Term of office		Party	Government(s)
Noel Dempsey	26 June 1997	6 June 2002	Fianna Fáil	25th
Martin Cullen	6 June 2002	10 June 2003	Fianna Fáil	26th
=== Minister for the Environment, Heritage and Local Government 2002–2011 ===
Name	Term of office		Party	Government(s)
Martin Cullen	10 June 2003	29 September 2004	Fianna Fáil	26th
Dick Roche	29 September 2004	14 June 2007	Fianna Fáil	26th
John Gormley	14 June 2007	23 January 2011	Green	27th • 28th
Éamon Ó Cuív	23 January 2011	9 March 2011	Fianna Fáil	28th
=== Minister for the Environment, Community and Local Government 2011–2016 ===
Name	Term of office		Party	Government(s)
Phil Hogan	9 March 2011	11 July 2014	Fine Gael	29th
Alan Kelly	11 July 2014	6 May 2016	Labour	29th
=== Minister for Housing, Planning, Community and Local Government 2016–2017 ===
Name	Term of office		Party	Government(s)
Simon Coveney	6 May 2016	14 June 2017	Fine Gael	30th
=== Minister for Housing, Planning and Local Government 2017–2020 ===
Name	Term of office		Party	Government(s)
Eoghan Murphy	14 June 2017	27 June 2020	Fine Gael	31st
=== Minister for Housing, Local Government and Heritage 2020–present ===
Name	Term of office		Party	Government(s)
Darragh O'Brien	27 June 2020	23 January 2025	Fianna Fáil	32nd • 33rd • 34th
James Browne	23 January 2025	Incumbent	Fianna Fáil	35th
