= Dáil Éireann confidence motions =

Motions of no confidence in the lower Irish house

If a motion of no confidence in the Taoiseach or Government of Ireland is passed by Dáil Éireann, or a motion of confidence is defeated, then the Constitution requires both the Taoiseach and the Government to resign. After this, either a replacement Taoiseach is elected by the Dáil, or the Dáil is dissolved and a general election is held. Motions have twice brought down the government, in each case resulting in an election: in November 1982 and again in November 1992.

== Confidence and supply ==
In the Westminster model of parliamentary democracy, the minimum support necessary for a cabinet government to continue in office is confidence and supply from the legislative chamber or house to which the government is responsible. In Ireland's bicameral Oireachtas, the government is responsible to the Dáil (lower house). As well as the November 1982 and November 1992 instances of loss of confidence, there has been one occasion when the Irish government fell due to loss of supply in the Dáil. That was in January 1982, when Jim Kemmy withdrew support for the minority Fine Gael–Labour government by opposing a budget resolution (apocryphally because it would introduce VAT on children's shoes). In 1949, the Inter-Party government immediately sought leave to reintroduce a budget estimate "referred back for reconsideration" by 62–59 vote of the Dáil; the estimate duly passed 73–59 the next week. The Fianna Fáil opposition argued unsuccessfully that the first vote should have been taken as loss of confidence and supply, triggering the government's resignation.

Loss of supply is when the opposition defeats a government spending proposal; the converse, when the government fails to defeat an opposition spending proposal, is merely symbolic, as both the 1922 and 1937 constitutions prohibit Oireachtas spending without government approval. On 27 March 1930, due to the temporary absence of several Cumann na nGaedheal TDs, a Fianna Fáil opposition private member's money bill passed second reading; W. T. Cosgrave observed the formality of resigning as President of the Executive Council. He and the Executive Council were immediately re-elected by the Dáil.

There have been occasions when Seanad Éireann (the upper house) voted on a confidence motion; even if the government had lost the motion, it would not have fallen. Similarly, Dáil motions of no confidence in a minister other than the Taoiseach would not formally necessitate a dissolution, although they may be treated politically as confidence in the whole government, on the basis of cabinet collective responsibility. The Social Democrats suggested their (unsuccessful) 2019 motion against Eoghan Murphy did not entail an election. In October 1976, Fianna Fáil proposed a motion calling on the Taoiseach to request the Minister for Defence, Paddy Donegan, to resign, which was similar in effect if not in form to a confidence motion. It was defeated by 63 votes to 58, and took place a week before a motion of confidence in the government in the circumstances of the same controversy.

In the revolutionary Dáil of the self-proclaimed Irish Republic, the Dáil vote on 7 January 1922 to approve the Anglo-Irish Treaty was a defeat in the position advocated by Éamon de Valera, who took it as loss of confidence and resigned as President of Dáil Éireann. De Valera was proposed again for the position of president, but was defeated; the Dáil was not dissolved and the pro-Treaty majority voted Arthur Griffith as the new president.

In December 1982, Fianna Fáil turned an adjournment debate into an ersatz motion of confidence in the Fine Gael–Labour coalition. First Séamus Brennan tabled an amendment to the adjournment motion, "and requests the Taoiseach in the meantime to advise the President to dissolve the Dáil"; then in the ensuing debate other Fianna Fáil TDs mentioned the budget, so that losing the debate would imply loss of supply. The amendment was defeated 82–81.

== Ensuing dissolutions ==
Whereas in some jurisdictions the convention is for a prime minister who has lost confidence or supply to call an election, in Ireland he may be unable to do so, because the post-1937 Constitution gives the President absolute discretion to refuse to dissolve the Dáil when requested by a Taoiseach who has lost confidence. As of 2021 no President has made such a refusal. The intention is to allow the Dáil to choose an alternative Taoiseach and government from among the existing Oireachtas members without the trouble of an election. During the 1937 debate on the draft Constitution, Patrick McGilligan suggested making it compulsory rather than discretionary for the President to refuse a dissolution to a Taoiseach who had lost confidence; Éamon de Valera, the Constitution's prime instigator, rejected this, explaining his rationale:

I take it that, if the Government has failed to secure support and faces the Dáil again, a new Government would be elected. For instance, if there was a measure which was regarded by the Government as one of primary importance, one which they felt it was essential they should get if they were to continue in office, there might be the question of getting a vote of confidence. If they felt that in those circumstances they could not, in fact, get a vote of confidence in the Dáil, then the Prime Minister would go to the President and say: "Our Government has been defeated on a measure of primary importance, and if I go for a vote of confidence on this question I do not think that I can get it, but the matter on which I have been defeated is of such a character that I am satisfied that if the people, the ultimate court for deciding these matters, got the opportunity they would decide in my favour." Under these circumstances the President has the right to say to him: "Well, you were defeated, and I am not going to give you dissolution." What, then, would be the position of the Taoiseach? He would go back to the Dáil and resign because obviously he could not carry on if he has to face a Dáil in which he is in a minority. It is stated here definitely that he has to resign if he fails to command support in Dáil Eireann. Therefore, the position for him was that he had to resign. Dáil Eireann would proceed to elect another Taoiseach and there would be a new Government formed. That is the position on that hypothesis. On the other hand, if he goes to the President, and the President agrees with him that the situation is one in which the people ought to be given an opportunity to decide the question, he can say: "Very well, you prepare the proclamation and I will sign it, and we will dissolve Parliament. Then there is an election on that issue, and the electors will settle whether the Taoiseach, when he comes back, has a majority to carry on, or whether he is in a minority. What that simply means is that we are making provision in the Constitution for the possibility of referring a question of primary importance, on which the Government has been defeated, to the people for a decision.

On two occasions the president's power to refuse a dissolution was politically significant. In January 1982, President Patrick Hillery acceded to Taoiseach Garret FitzGerald's request for a dissolution, resulting in a general election. Brian Lenihan Snr unsuccessfully tried to persuade the President to refuse a dissolution and allow Fianna Fáil to try to form a new government; an action which caused controversy when he ran in the 1990 presidential election. In 1994, when Labour left the coalition it had formed with Fianna Fáil in 1992, there was neither a confidence motion nor a request for a dissolution. Instead, negotiations led to a new coalition of Fine Gael, Labour, and Democratic Left. Fianna Fáil Taoiseach Albert Reynolds did not attempt to forestall this by requesting a dissolution, because he believed President Mary Robinson would have refused.

Whereas losing a formal confidence motion is legal proof that "a Taoiseach … has ceased to retain the support of a majority in Dáil Éireann", jurists express uncertainty over how other scenarios might fulfil this Constitutional proviso. Robinson sought legal advice after the 1994 Labour walkout, but since Reynolds did not seek a dissolution, her power to refuse him was not tested. On several occasions a Taoiseach leading a minority government has obtained a dissolution where diminished support meant they would be vulnerable to losing a motion of confidence: in September 1927, (Note: The head of government in 1927 was styled President of the Executive Council rather than Taoiseach. The Dáil adjourned in August but was not dissolved until September.) 1938, 1944, 1951, 1957, 1987, and 2020. The 1922 Constitution of the Irish Free State required an Executive Council which had lost the Dáil's confidence to have its approval for a dissolution; W. T. Cosgrave circumvented this in September 1927 by calling an election while the Dáil was adjourned.

== Procedure for motions ==
The standing orders of the Dáil have no special provisions for confidence motions, which are treated like any other motion. However, the prohibition on repeating motions previously moved in a session does not apply to confidence motions. Most motions of no confidence in Ireland have been tabled by an opposition party when the government's majority is secure but it is dealing with scandals, embarrassments, or poor election results. The opposition has no prospect of winning the vote, but can inflict symbolic damage in the debate. The practice in such cases is for the government to replace the opposition motion of no confidence with its own motion of confidence; either by an amendment to the original motion replacing its entire wording, or by using its control of the legislative agenda to pre-empt the usual order of business with a new motion. The time allocated for government speakers is higher on its own motion than it would have been on an opposition motion.

== List of motions ==
Dáil motions of confidence in the government or Taoiseach
Date	Govt No.	Govt parties	Proposer	Govt majority (votes) (Note: The first number is votes for the government or Taoiseach, i.e. votes in favour of a motion of confidence or against a motion of no confidence. The second number is votes against the government or Taoiseach. From 2016, a third number gives recorded abstentions (as distinct from those absent or not voting).)	Motion	Context
16 August 1927	3rd EC	Cumann na nGaedheal	Labour Thomas Johnston	0 (71–71) (Note: Defeated on the casting vote of Ceann Comhairle Michael Hayes.)	That the Executive Council has ceased to retain the support of the majority in Dáil Eireann	Fianna Fáil had just ended its abstentionism, so that the Cumann na nGaedheal government no longer had a Dáil working majority. Fianna Fáil had agreed to support a minority government of Labour and the National League Party. However, two National League TDs failed to support the motion: Vincent Rice defected to Cumann na nGaedheal, and John Jinks was mysteriously absent. W. T. Cosgrave secured a Dáil adjournment, then dissolved the Dáil before it had a chance to table another confidence motion. Cumann na nGaedheal returned stronger after the ensuing election and formed the next ministry.
30 June–2 July 1953	6th	Fianna Fáil	Taoiseach Éamon de Valera	2 (73–71)	That Dáil Éireann reaffirms its confidence in the Government	Government had just lost two by-elections
29–30 October 1958	8th	Fianna Fáil	Labour William Norton	17 (54–71)	That, in view of the continued high level of unemployment and emigration and the failure of the Government to fulfil the promises made at the last general election that they would deal effectively with these problems, the Dáil has no confidence in the Government.	Economy: unemployment and emigration
30 October 1963	10th	Fianna Fáil	Taoiseach Seán Lemass	4 (73–69)	That the Dáil, regarding as irresponsible and mischievous the action of certain political parties in continuing to oppose the tax arrangements made in the Finance Act, 1963, without proposing alternative taxation to provide for the maintenance of the public services; for their extension in the spheres of education, health, housing, and social welfare; and for the fulfilment of the Government's Programme for the nation's agricultural and industrial development and social progress, confirms its support for the Government and urges them to proceed with the vigorous implementation of their Programme.	Introduction of turnover tax in the 1963 budget. Government motion amended a motion from the Labour Party moved by Brendan Corish: That in view of the widespread public opposition to the turnover tax, the Dáil is of opinion that the Government have lost the confidence of the people, and, therefore, considers that they should resign forthwith.
8 July 1966	11th	Fianna Fáil	Labour Brendan Corish	16 (50–66)	That Dáil Éireann bearing in mind the present economic situation, the lack of progress in creating new employment and in reducing unemployment and emigration, together with the crisis in the provision of finance for housing, has no confidence in the present Government.	There was no debate on the motion itself; the adjournment debate for the summer recess was held immediately beforehand and served in effect as the debate on the Labour and Fine Gael confidence motions.
8 July 1966	11th	Fianna Fáil	Fine Gael Liam Cosgrave	12 (54–66)	That Dáil Éireann has no confidence in the present Government.	Motion put to a vote immediately after the preceding Labour motion.
5–7 November 1968	12th	Fianna Fáil	Taoiseach Jack Lynch	8 (68–60)	That Dáil Éireann reaffirms its confidence in the Government and approves the Government's financial proposals	Rejection at referendum of the government's proposals to change the electoral system and favour rural constituencies.
13–14 May 1970	13th	Fianna Fáil	Taoiseach Jack Lynch	8 (72–64)	That Dáil Éireann reaffirms its confidence in the Government	Arms Crisis
29 October–4 November 1970	13th	Fianna Fáil	Taoiseach Jack Lynch	7 (74–67)	That Dáil Éireann reaffirms its confidence in An Taoiseach and the other Members of the Government	Arms Trial. Jack Lynch said "it was my prerogative as Leader of the Government Party to put down a positive motion in the face of motions of no confidence tabled by the Opposition".
23–29 October 1974	14th	Fine Gael–Labour	Taoiseach Liam Cosgrave	5 (70–65)	That Dáil Éireann affirms its confidence in the Government.	First oil shock recession. Jack Lynch said, "The purpose of this debate, as initiated by our motion of no confidence in the Government, was to highlight the rapid deterioration in the economy and in the Government's total and abject failure to come to grips with the situation".
28 October 1976	14th	Fine Gael–Labour	Taoiseach Liam Cosgrave	6 (73–67)	That Dáil Éireann affirms its confidence in the Government	Resignation of Cearbhall Ó Dálaigh precipitated by criticism from minister Paddy Donegan.
29–30 May 1979	15th	Fianna Fáil	Minister for Fisheries and Forestry Brian Lenihan Snr	21 (67–46)	That Dáil Éireann expresses its satisfaction at the Government's management of the economy	Second oil shock recession. Government amendment to the motion passed without division. Original motion by Labour Frank Cluskey: That Dáil Éireann gravely concerned about the serious economic mismanagement of the country by the Government declares that this House and the people of Ireland have no confidence in the Government
1 July 1982	18th	Fianna Fáil	Taoiseach Charles Haughey	7 (84–77)	That Dáil Éireann reaffirms its confidence in the Government	Haughey had survived attempts to remove him as party leader, and opposed an EEC boycott of Argentina during the Falklands War. The government's deficit was criticised by the European Commission.
3–4 November 1982	18th	Fianna Fáil	Taoiseach Charles Haughey	−2 (80–82)	That Dáil Éireann reaffirms its confidence in the Government	Haughey had survived further attempts to remove him as party leader. After GUBU and other scandals, the Workers' Party withdrew its support. Defeat led to the November 1982 Irish general election.
20–21 February 1986	19th	Fine Gael–Labour	Tánaiste Dick Spring	5 (82–77)	That Dáil Éireann reaffirms its confidence in the Taoiseach and the Government	A botched reshuffle of government and junior ministers.
22–23 October 1986	19th	Fine Gael–Labour	Taoiseach Garret FitzGerald	2 (83–81)	That Dáil Éireann reaffirms its confidence in the Taoiseach and the Government	Economy: unemployment, taxation, and emigration.
31 October 1990	21st	Fianna Fáil–Progressive Democrats	Taoiseach Charles Haughey	3 (83–80)	That Dáil Éireann reaffirms its confidence in the Government	Dismissal of Brian Lenihan Snr during the 1990 presidential election.
16–18 October 1991	21st	Fianna Fáil–Progressive Democrats	Taoiseach Charles Haughey	3 (84–81)	That Dáil Éireann reaffirms its confidence in the Government	Alleged "Golden Circle" of businessmen favoured by Fianna Fáil.
5 November 1992	22nd	Fianna Fáil	Taoiseach Albert Reynolds	−11 (77–88)	That Dáil Éireann reaffirms its confidence in the Taoiseach and the Government	The PDs had just left the coalition, after Reynolds had accused leader Dessie O'Malley of being "reckless, irresponsible and dishonest" in his evidence to the Beef Tribunal. Defeat led to the 1992 Irish general election.
28 October 1993	23rd	Fianna Fáil–Labour	Taoiseach Albert Reynolds	39 (94–55)	That Dáil Éireann reaffirms its confidence in the Government	Amount of European Structural Funds allocated to Ireland was £7.2bn, as opposed to the £8.2bn announced previously.
16–17 November 1994	23rd	Fianna Fáil–Labour	Taoiseach Albert Reynolds	Withdrawn when the government collapsed		During a controversy over the Attorney General's office delay extraditing paedophile priest Brendan Smyth, Reynolds appointed Attorney General Harry Whelehan to the High Court. After the confidence motion was tabled, Labour left the coalition and Reynolds resigned as Taoiseach the following day.
12–13 November 1996	24th	Fine Gael–Labour–Democratic Left	Taoiseach John Bruton	9 (79–70)	That Dáil Éireann reaffirms its confidence in the Government	Judge Dominic Lynch not informed of his de-listing and continued to hear cases.
30 June 2000	25th	Fianna Fáil–Progressive Democrats	Taoiseach Bertie Ahern	9 (79–70)	That Dáil Éireann reaffirms its confidence in the Government	Bertie Ahern's evidence to the Moriarty Tribunal about his handling of Fianna Fáil finances. Original no-confidence motion proposed by Labour.
26 September 2007	27th	Fianna Fáil–Greens–Progressive Democrats	Taoiseach Bertie Ahern	5 (81–76)	That Dáil Éireann affirms confidence in the Taoiseach and the Government	Bertie Ahern's testimony to the Mahon Tribunal ("Tribunal of Inquiry into Certain Planning Matters and Payments"). Replaced Fine Gael motion: That Dáil Éireann has no confidence in An Taoiseach Bertie Ahern.
9–10 June 2009	28th	Fianna Fáil–Greens–Independent (Note: Mary Harney remained a cabinet minister after the dissolution of the Progressive Democrats.)	Taoiseach Brian Cowen	6 (85–79)	That Dáil Éireann reaffirms its confidence in the Government	Poor result for government parties in the previous week's local and European elections. The original motion proposed was: That Dáil Éireann has no confidence in the Government
15 June 2010	28th	Fianna Fáil–Greens–Independent	Taoiseach Brian Cowen	5 (82–77)	That Dáil Éireann has confidence in the Taoiseach and the Government	Publication of official reports on the 2008 Irish banking crisis, which were critical of government decisions. The original Fine Gael motion was: That Dáil Éireann has no confidence in An Taoiseach, Deputy Brian Cowen
11–12 December 2012	29th	Fine Gael–Labour	Minister for Public Expenditure and Reform Brendan Howlin	37 (88–51)	That Dáil Éireann has confidence in the Government as it deals with the current economic crisis in as fair a manner as possible, while prioritising economic recovery and job creation	Handling of the post-2008 Irish economic downturn. The original no-confidence motion, proposed by Sinn Féin was amended into a confidence-motion by the government.
9 December 2014	29th	Fine Gael–Labour	Taoiseach Enda Kenny	31 (86–55)	That Dáil Éireann reaffirms i[t]s confidence in the Taoiseach and in the Government.	Irish Water metering and charges. The original Sinn Féin no-confidence motion was scheduled for the following day, the same time as a Sinn-Féin-backed anti-water-charges protest rally outside Leinster House.
22 September 2015	29th	Fine Gael–Labour	Taoiseach Enda Kenny	42 (94–52)	That Dáil Éireann welcomes the publication of the Interim Report of the Fennelly Commission and notes its conclusions and reaffirms its confidence in the Taoiseach, in the Attorney General and in the Government.	Fennelly Commission's interim report on the resignation of Martin Callinan. The government motion replaced two opposition motions, from Fianna Fáil and Sinn Féin.
15 February 2017	30th	Fine Gael–Independents	Taoiseach Enda Kenny	5 (57–52–44)	That Dáil Éireann reaffirms its confidence in the Government	Handling of the Garda whistleblower scandal. The government motion replaced one from Sinn Féin.
12 July 2022	31st	Fine Gael–Fianna Fáil–Greens	Government party leaders: Taoiseach Micheál Martin, Tánaiste Leo Varadkar, minister Eamon Ryan	19 (85–66–1)	That Dáil Éireann reaffirms its confidence in the Government.	The government had lost its majority after several backbenchers lost the whip for various protest votes against government policies. The government motion replaced one from Sinn Féin.
29 March 2023	32nd	Fine Gael–Fianna Fáil–Greens	Government party leaders: Taoiseach Leo Varadkar, Tánaiste Micheál Martin, minister Eamon Ryan	19 (86–67) (Note: Motion 82/2023; "Confidence in Government: Motion". Oireachtas. 29 March 2023.)	That Dáil Éireann reaffirms its confidence in the Government.	The government declined to extend an "eviction ban" (moratorium on termination of leases on private rented accommodation) which the opposition alleged would exasperate an ongoing housing shortage. The government motion replaced one from the Labour Party.
14 April 2026	34th	Fine Gael–Fianna Fáil	Government party leaders: Taoiseach Micheál Martin, Tánaiste Simon Harris	18 (92–78)	That Dáil Éireann reaffirms its confidence in the Government.	In response to the 2026 Irish Fuel Protests, a series of nationwide demonstrations that began on 7 April 2026 in response to rapidly rising fuel prices and broader cost-of-living pressures.

== Sources ==
- MacCarthaigh, Muiris (1 January 2005). "How parliamentary accountability functions in Dáil Éireann". Accountability in Irish Parliamentary Politics. Institute of Public Administration. ISBN 9781904541318.
- Mitchell, Paul (19 January 2006). "Ireland: 'O What a Tangled Web …'—Delegation, Accountability, and Executive Power". In Strøm, Kaare; Müller, Wolfgang C.; Bergman, Torbjörn (eds.). Delegation and Accountability in Parliamentary Democracies. Oxford University Press. pp. 418–444. doi:10.1093/019829784X.003.0013. ISBN 9780199291601.
- Constitution of Ireland
- Dáil debates 1919–present
