= Government of the 18th Dáil =

Irish governments from 1965 to 1969

There were two governments in the 18th Dáil, which was elected at the 1965 general election held on 7 April 1965. Both were single-party Fianna Fáil governments, which had been in government since the 1957 election. The 11th government of Ireland (21 April 1965 – 10 November 1966) was led by Seán Lemass as Taoiseach and lasted for 1 year, 203 days. The 12th government of Ireland (10 November 1966 – 2 July 1969) was led by Jack Lynch as Taoiseach and lasted for 2 years, 234 days.

== 11th government of Ireland ==
11th government of Ireland
- Government of Ireland

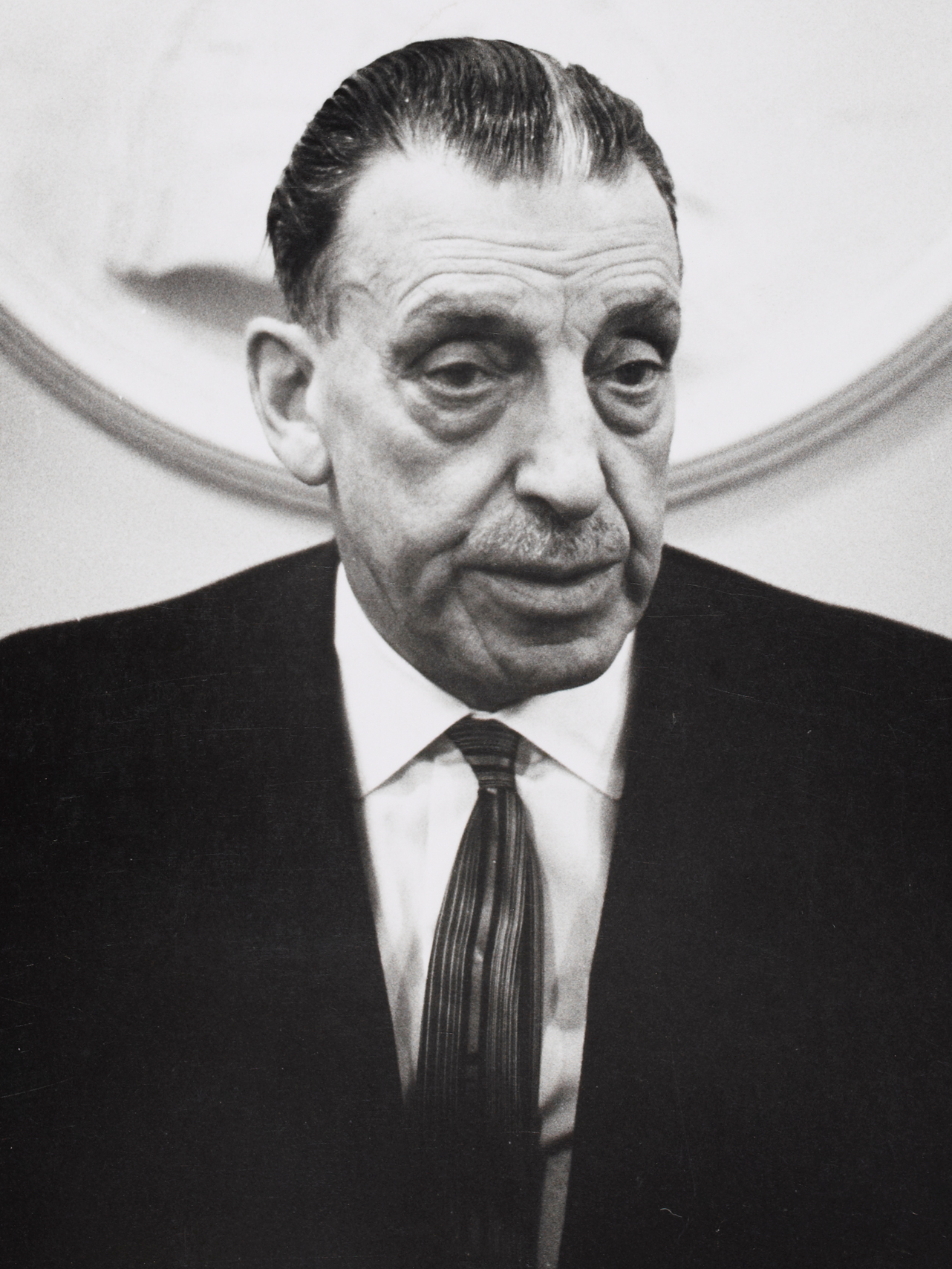
- Date formed: 21 April 1965
- Date dissolved: 10 November 1966

People and organisations
- President: Éamon de Valera
- Taoiseach: Seán Lemass
- Tánaiste: Frank Aiken
- Total no. of members: 14
- Member party: Fianna Fáil
- Status in legislature: Majority government
- Opposition party: Fine Gael
- Opposition leader: Liam Cosgrave

History
- Election: 1965 general election
- Legislature terms: 18th Dáil; 11th Seanad
- Predecessor: 10th government
- Successor: 12th government

=== Nomination of Taoiseach ===
The 18th Dáil first met on 21 April 1965. In the debate on the nomination of Taoiseach, Fianna Fáil leader and outgoing Taoiseach Seán Lemass, Fine Gael leader James Dillon, and Labour Party leader Brendan Corish were each proposed. The nomination of Lemass was carried with 72 votes in favour and 67 votes against. Lemass was re-appointed as Taoiseach by President Éamon de Valera.

21 April 1965; Nomination of Seán Lemass (FF) as Taoiseach; Motion proposed by Seán MacEntee and seconded by Johnny Geoghegan; Absolute majority: 73/144
Vote	Parties	Votes
Yes	Fianna Fáil (72)	72 / 144
No	Fine Gael (47), Labour Party (20)	67 / 144
Absent or Not voting	Ceann Comhairle (1), Independents (2), Labour Party (1), Clann na Poblachta (1)	5 / 144

=== Members of the government ===
After his appointment as Taoiseach by the president, Seán Lemass proposed the members of the government and they were approved by the Dáil. They were appointed by the president on the same day.

Office	Name	Term
Taoiseach	Seán Lemass	1965–1966
Tánaiste	Frank Aiken	1965–1966
Minister for External Affairs	Frank Aiken	1965–1966
Minister for Agriculture and Fisheries (Note: The Department of Agriculture was renamed as the Department of Agriculture and Fisheries on 2 July 1965.)	Charles Haughey	1965–1966
Minister for Defence	Michael Hilliard	1965–1966
Minister for Education	George Colley	1965–1966
Minister for Finance	Jack Lynch	1965–1966
Minister for the Gaeltacht	Mícheál Ó Móráin	1965–1966
Minister for Lands	Mícheál Ó Móráin	1965–1966
Minister for Health	Donogh O'Malley	1965–1966
Minister for Industry and Commerce	Patrick Hillery	1965–1966
Minister for Justice	Brian Lenihan	1965–1966
Minister for Local Government	Neil Blaney	1965–1966
Minister for Posts and Telegraphs	Joseph Brennan	1965–1966
Minister for Social Welfare	Kevin Boland	1965–1966
Minister for Transport and Power	Erskine H. Childers	1965–1966
==== Changes 13 July 1966 ==== Seán Flanagan was appointed to government on 6 July 1966. A reshuffle took place after the establishment of the Department of Labour under the Ministers and Secretaries (Amendment) Act 1966 on 13 July 1966.
Office	Name	Term
Minister for Education	Donogh O'Malley	1966
Minister for Health	Seán Flanagan	1966
Minister for Industry and Commerce	George Colley	1966
Minister for Labour	Patrick Hillery	1966

Change to department

=== Parliamentary Secretaries ===
On 21 April 1965, the government appointed the Parliamentary Secretaries on the nomination of the Taoiseach.

Name	Office
Michael Carty	Government Chief Whip; Parliamentary Secretary to the Minister for Defence
Patrick Lalor	Parliamentary Secretary to the Minister for Agriculture
Jim Gibbons	Parliamentary Secretary to the Minister for Finance
Pádraig Faulkner	Parliamentary Secretary to the Minister for the Gaeltacht
Seán Flanagan	Parliamentary Secretary to the Minister for Industry and Commerce
Paudge Brennan	Parliamentary Secretary to the Minister for Local Government

=== Confidence in the government ===
On 8 July 1966, Labour leader Brendan Corish and Fine Gael leader Liam Cosgrave placed separate motions of no confidence in the government. They were debated as part of the debate on the summer adjournment. The motions were defeated, on votes of 50 to 66 and 54 to 66 respectively.

=== Resignation ===
Seán Lemass resigned as Fianna Fáil leader and Jack Lynch won the leadership election to succeed him on 9 November 1966. On the following day, Lemass resigned as Taoiseach.

== 12th government of Ireland ==
The 12th government was formed by Jack Lynch after the resignation of Seán Lemass.

12th government of Ireland
- Government of Ireland

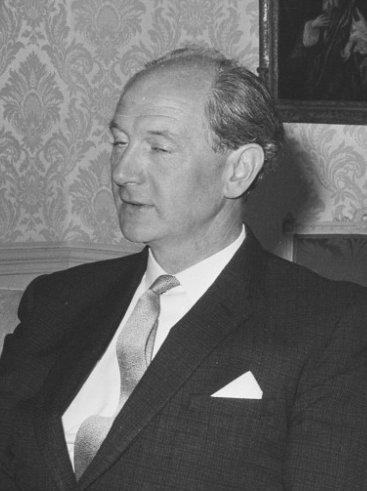
- Date formed: 10 November 1966
- Date dissolved: 2 July 1969

People and organisations
- President: Éamon de Valera
- Taoiseach: Jack Lynch
- Tánaiste: Frank Aiken
- Total no. of members: 14
- Member party: Fianna Fáil
- Status in legislature: Majority government
- Opposition party: Fine Gael
- Opposition leader: Liam Cosgrave

History
- Legislature terms: 18th Dáil; 11th Seanad
- Predecessor: 11th government
- Successor: 13th government

=== Nomination of Taoiseach ===
On 10 November 1966, in the debate on the nomination of Taoiseach, Fianna Fáil leader Jack Lynch, Fine Gael leader Liam Cosgrave, and Labour Party leader Brendan Corish were each proposed. The nomination of Lynch was carried with 71 votes in favour and 64 votes against. Lynch was appointed as Taoiseach by President Éamon de Valera.

10 November 1966; Nomination of Jack Lynch (FF) as Taoiseach; Motion proposed by Seán Lemass and seconded by Frank Aiken; Absolute majority: 73/144
Vote	Parties	Votes
Yes	Fianna Fáil (71)	71 / 144
No	Fine Gael (44), Labour Party (20)	64 / 144
Absent or Not voting	Ceann Comhairle (1), Independents (2), Fine Gael (2), Labour Party (1), Clann na Poblachta (1)	7 / 144
Vacancies	2	2 / 144

=== Members of the government ===
After his appointment as Taoiseach by the president, Jack Lynch proposed the members of the government and they were approved by the Dáil on 16 November 1966. They were appointed by the president on the same day.

Office	Name	Term
Taoiseach	Jack Lynch	1966–1969
Tánaiste	Frank Aiken	1966–1969
Minister for External Affairs	Frank Aiken	1966–1969
Minister for Agriculture and Fisheries	Neil Blaney	1966–1969
Minister for Defence	Michael Hilliard	1966–1969
Minister for Education	Donogh O'Malley	1966–1968
Minister for Finance	Charles Haughey	1966–1969
Minister for the Gaeltacht	Mícheál Ó Móráin	1966–1969
Minister for Lands	Mícheál Ó Móráin	1966–1968
Minister for Health	Seán Flanagan	1966–1969
Minister for Industry and Commerce	George Colley	1966–1969
Minister for Justice	Brian Lenihan	1966–1968
Minister for Labour	Patrick Hillery	1966–1969
Minister for Local Government	Kevin Boland	1966–1969
Minister for Posts and Telegraphs	Erskine H. Childers	1966–1969
Minister for Transport and Power	Erskine H. Childers	1966–1969
Minister for Social Welfare	Joseph Brennan	1966–1969
==== Changes 26 March 1968 ==== Following the death of Donogh O'Malley on 10 March 1968.
Office	Name	Term
Minister for Education	Brian Lenihan	1968–1969
Minister for Justice	Mícheál Ó Móráin	1968–1969
Minister for Lands	Pádraig Faulkner	1968–1969
Minister for the Gaeltacht	Pádraig Faulkner	1968–1969

=== Parliamentary Secretaries ===
On 16 November 1966, the government appointed the Parliamentary Secretaries on the nomination of the Taoiseach.

Name	Office	Term
Michael Carty	Government Chief Whip; Parliamentary Secretary to the Minister for Defence	1966–1969
Don Davern	Parliamentary Secretary to the Minister for Agriculture and Fisheries	1966–1968
Jim Gibbons	Parliamentary Secretary to the Minister for Finance	1966–1969
Pádraig Faulkner	Parliamentary Secretary to the Minister for the Gaeltacht	1966–1968
Paudge Brennan	Parliamentary Secretary to the Minister for Local Government	1966–1969
Patrick Lalor	Parliamentary Secretary to the Minister for Posts and Telegraphs; Parliamentary Secretary to the Minister for Transport and Power	1966–1969

=== Constitutional referendums ===
The government proposed the Third Amendment of the Constitution Bill 1968, which would have allowed for divergence in the ratio of population to representation across Dáil constituencies, and the Fourth Amendment of the Constitution Bill 1968, which would have altered the electoral system from proportional representation by means of the single transferable vote (PR-STV) to first past the post (FPTP). They were put to referendums on 16 October 1968, and both were defeated by a margin of 39.2% to 60.8%. It was the second time a Fianna Fáil government had proposed to introduce FPTP, with a previous referendum defeated in 1959.

=== Confidence in the government ===
On 5 November 1968, Taoiseach Jack Lynch proposed a motion of confidence in the government, which was debated over three days. On 7 November, it was approved on a vote of 68 to 60.
