= Third Amendment of the Constitution Bill 1958 =

Proposal to alter the Dáil electoral system

- 17 June 1959
- To alter the Dáil electoral system from single transferable vote to first-past-the-post

Results
Choice	Votes	%
Yes	453,322	48.21%
No	486,989	51.79%
Valid votes	940,311	96.00%
Invalid or blank votes	39,220	4.00%
Total votes	979,531	100.00%
Registered voters/turnout	1,678,450	58.36%
- Results by Dáil constituency

The Third Amendment of the Constitution Bill 1958 was a proposal to amend the Constitution of Ireland to alter the electoral system from proportional representation under the single transferable vote (PR-STV) to first-past-the-post (FPTP). The proposal was rejected in a referendum held on 17 June 1959. This was the same date as the presidential election in which Taoiseach Éamon de Valera was elected as president.

== Background ==
Proportional representation by means of the single transferable vote had been used in Irish elections since the 1920 local elections. Under the Government of Ireland Act 1920, it was prescribed for elections to both the Southern Ireland House of Commons and the Northern Ireland House of Commons (Northern Ireland was to revert to FPTP for the 1929 election). The Constitution of the Irish Free State, adopted on independence in 1922, prescribed proportional representation for elections to Dáil Éireann. Under the Constitution of Ireland adopted in 1937, Article 16.2.5° prescribed PR-STV, while 16.2.6° specified that the number of members in a constituency would not be less than three.

An amendment to the 1937 constitution must be proposed as a bill initiated in the Dáil and be passed or deemed to have been passed in both the Dáil and the Seanad, before being submitted to a referendum in which all Irish citizens on the electoral register are eligible to vote.

== Proposal ==
The amendment proposed to alter the electoral system for elections to Dáil Éireann to first-past-the-post (FPTP) under single-seat constituencies. It also proposed to establish an independent commission for the drawing of constituency boundaries on a constitutional basis. It was introduced by the Fianna Fáil government of Éamon de Valera but was opposed by Fine Gael, the main opposition party, and by the Labour Party.

== Oireachtas debate ==
The amendment was proposed by Taoiseach Éamon de Valera on 12 November 1958. It passed the Dáil on 28 January 1959 by 74 votes to 55. On 19 March 1959, it was rejected in the Seanad by 29 votes to 28. Under Article 23.1, the Dáil may vote to deem a bill to have been passed by the Seanad by a resolution passed after a period of 90 days from being sent by the Dáil to the Seanad. On 13 May 1959, the Dáil passed such a resolution by 75 votes to 56, and the bill proceeded to a referendum.

== Voter information ==
The subject matter of the referendum was described as follows:

The Third Amendment of the Constitution Bill 1958 – At present, members of Dáil Éireann are elected on a system of proportional representation for constituencies returning at least three members, each voter having a single transferable vote. It is proposed in the Bill to abolish the system of proportional representation and to adopt, instead, a system of single-member constituencies, each voter having a single non-transferable vote. It is also proposed in the Bill to set up a Commission for the determination and revision of the constituencies, instead of having this done by the Oireachtas, as at present.

== Result ==
Third Amendment of the Constitution of Ireland Bill 1958
Choice	Votes	%
For	453,322	48.21
Against	486,989	51.79
Total	940,311	100.00
Valid votes	940,311	96.00
Invalid/blank votes	39,220	4.00
Total votes	979,531	100.00
Registered voters/turnout	1,678,450	58.36

Results by constituency
Constituency	Electorate	Turnout (%)	Votes		Proportion of votes	
Constituency	Electorate	Turnout (%)	Yes	No	Yes	No
Carlow–Kilkenny	56,117	62.3%	16,470	16,658	49.7%	50.3%
Cavan	36,762	67.7%	11,975	11,677	50.6%	49.4%
Clare	47,227	63.0%	16,390	12,295	57.2%	42.8%
Cork Borough	62,647	56.6%	15,025	19,523	43.5%	56.5%
Cork East	35,193	61.8%	10,510	10,425	50.2%	49.8%
Cork North	33,805	70.6%	10,898	11,986	47.6%	52.4%
Cork South	35,238	65.2%	9,898	11,945	45.3%	54.7%
Cork West	32,290	66.1%	8,677	11,573	42.9%	57.1%
Donegal East	40,863	55.8%	13,919	8,026	63.4%	36.6%
Donegal West	30,850	50.2%	8,682	6,207	58.3%	41.7%
Dublin County	74,084	50.9%	15,666	20,852	42.9%	57.1%
Dublin North-East	62,241	55.5%	13,091	20,738	38.7%	61.3%
Dublin North-Central	24,940	52.5%	4,862	7,737	38.6%	61.4%
Dublin North-West	31,441	54.1%	6,116	10,401	37.0%	63.0%
Dublin South-Central	50,045	48.6%	9,403	14,068	40.1%	59.9%
Dublin South-East	35,845	58.2%	7,245	13,109	35.6%	64.4%
Dublin South-West	61,631	52.6%	12,271	19,327	38.8%	61.2%
Dún Laoghaire and Rathdown	61,716	53.2%	11,859	20,043	37.2%	62.8%
Galway North	28,588	51.5%	8,150	5,939	57.8%	42.2%
Galway South	28,318	62.8%	10,198	6,839	59.9%	40.1%
Galway West	29,882	49.8%	8,840	5,493	61.7%	38.3%
Kerry North	43,718	50.4%	10,910	10,016	52.1%	47.9%
Kerry South	30,631	43.2%	6,330	6,213	50.5%	49.5%
Kildare	36,552	61.7%	9,488	12,186	43.8%	56.2%
Laois–Offaly	56,583	61.0%	17,155	15,851	52.0%	48.0%
Limerick East	45,980	64.0%	14,328	13,596	51.3%	48.7%
Limerick West	31,999	69.2%	11,499	9,442	54.9%	45.1%
Longford–Westmeath	49,243	69.7%	15,205	17,796	46.1%	53.9%
Louth	40,209	62.3%	11,801	12,429	48.7%	51.3%
Mayo North	32,358	50.0%	8,541	6,710	56.0%	44.0%
Mayo South	46,460	51.3%	11,646	11,164	51.1%	48.9%
Meath	37,686	63.3%	11,912	11,163	51.6%	48.4%
Monaghan	29,370	64.1%	9,498	8,205	53.7%	46.3%
Roscommon	38,658	59.7%	10,322	11,800	46.7%	53.3%
Sligo–Leitrim	57,271	54.6%	14,112	15,224	48.1%	51.9%
Tipperary North	32,467	63.6%	9,766	9,633	50.3%	49.7%
Tipperary South	41,196	70.5%	13,562	14,406	48.5%	51.5%
Waterford	42,777	60.2%	13,289	11,482	53.7%	46.3%
Wexford	50,150	62.7%	14,852	15,233	49.4%	50.6%
Wicklow	35,419	54.1%	8,961	9,579	48.3%	51.7%
Total	1,678,450	58.4%	453,322	486,989	48.2%	51.8%

== Aftermath ==
A second attempt by Fianna Fáil to abolish PR was also rejected by voters in the 1968 referendum on the electoral system.
