= Government of the 17th Dáil =

Irish government from 1961 to 1965

10th government of Ireland
- Government of Ireland

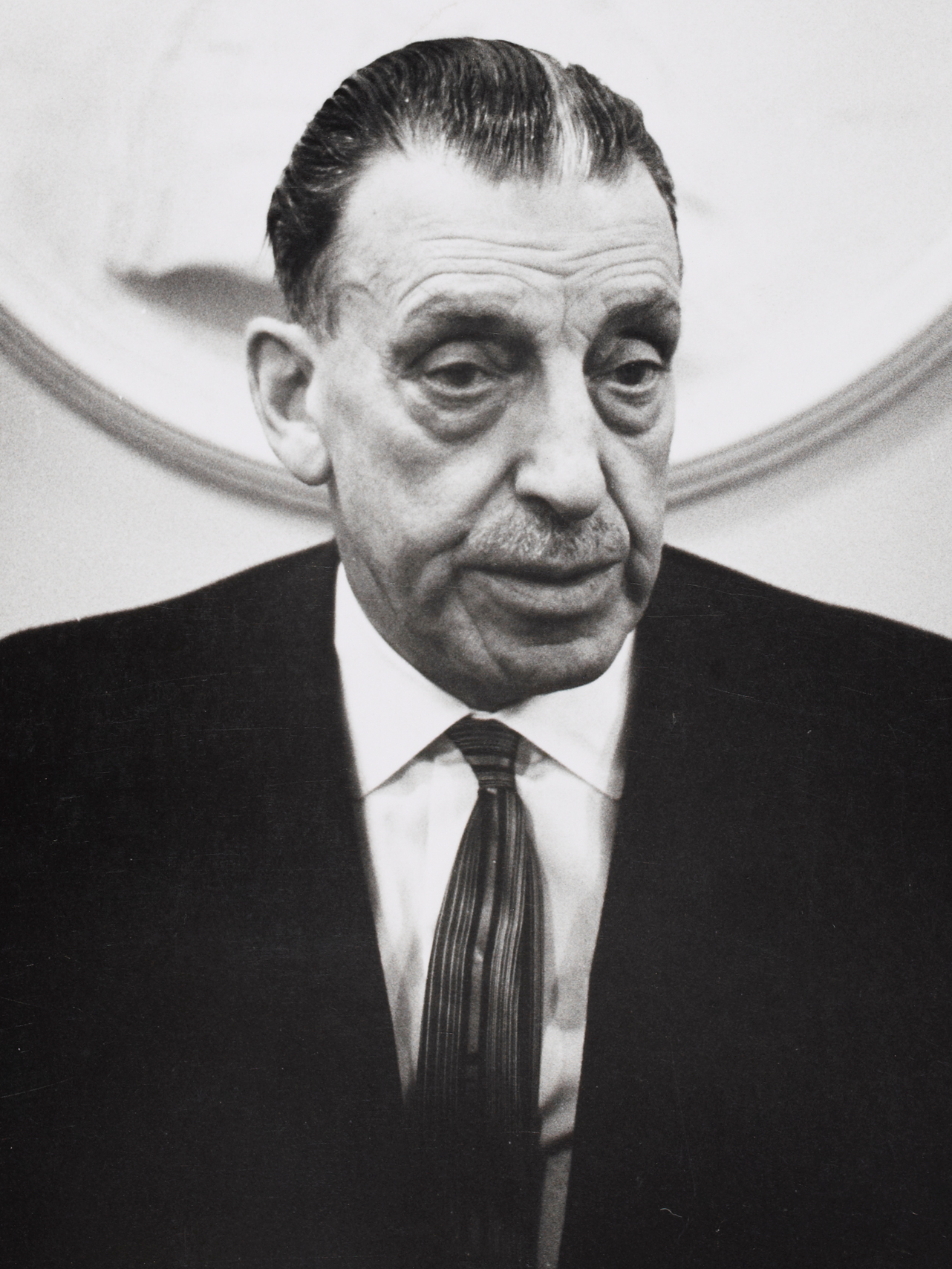
- Date formed: 11 October 1961
- Date dissolved: 21 April 1965

People and organisations
- President: Éamon de Valera
- Taoiseach: Seán Lemass
- Tánaiste: Seán MacEntee
- Total no. of members: 14
- Member party: Fianna Fáil
- Status in legislature: Minority government
- Opposition party: Fine Gael
- Opposition leader: James Dillon

History
- Election: 1961 general election
- Legislature terms: 17th Dáil; 10th Seanad
- Predecessor: 9th government
- Successor: 11th government

The 10th government of Ireland (11 October 1961 – 21 April 1965) was the government of Ireland formed after the 1961 general election to the 17th Dáil held on 4 October 1961. It was a minority government formed by Fianna Fáil, which had been in office since the 1957 election. It was the first election it had won since Seán Lemass had succeeded Éamon de Valera as leader. It lasted for 3 years, 192 days.

== Nomination of Taoiseach ==
The 17th Dáil first met on 11 October 1961. In the debate on the nomination of Taoiseach, Fianna Fáil leader and outgoing Taoiseach Seán Lemass, Fine Gael leader James Dillon, and Labour Party leader Brendan Corish were each proposed. The nomination of Lemass was carried with 72 votes in favour and 68 against. Lemass was re-appointed as Taoiseach by President Éamon de Valera.

11 October 1961; Nomination of Seán Lemass (FF) as Taoiseach; Motion proposed by Seán MacEntee and seconded by James Ryan; Absolute majority: 73/144
Vote	Parties	Votes
Yes	Fianna Fáil (70), Independents (2)	72 / 144
No	Fine Gael (47), Labour Party (15), Clann na Talmhan (2), National Progressive Democrats (2), Clann na Poblachta (1), Independent (1)	68 / 144
Not voting	Ceann Comhairle (1), Independents (3)	4 / 144

== Members of the government ==
After his appointment as Taoiseach by the president, Seán Lemass proposed the members of the government and they were approved by the Dáil. They were appointed by the president on 12 October 1961.

Office	Name	Term
Taoiseach	Seán Lemass	1961–1965
Tánaiste	Seán MacEntee	1961–1965
Minister for Health	Seán MacEntee	1961–1965
Minister for Agriculture	Paddy Smith	1961–1964
Minister for Defence	Gerald Bartley	1961–1965
Minister for Education	Patrick Hillery	1961–1965
Minister for Finance	James Ryan	1961–1965
Minister for External Affairs	Frank Aiken	1961–1965
Minister for the Gaeltacht	Mícheál Ó Móráin	1961–1965
Minister for Lands	Mícheál Ó Móráin	1961–1965
Minister for Industry and Commerce	Jack Lynch	1961–1965
Minister for Justice	Charles Haughey	1961–1964
Minister for Local Government	Neil Blaney	1961–1965
Minister for Posts and Telegraphs	Michael Hilliard	1961–1965
Minister for Social Welfare	Kevin Boland	1961–1965
Minister for Transport and Power	Erskine H. Childers	1961–1965
=== Changes 8 October 1964 === Paddy Smith resigned in disagreement at the government's response to certain farming issues.
Office	Name	Term
Minister for Agriculture	Charles Haughey	1964–1965
Minister for Justice	Seán Lemass	(acting)
=== Changes 3 November 1964 === Appointment of new member of the government in place of Smith.
Office	Name	Term
Minister for Justice	Brian Lenihan	1964–1965

== Parliamentary Secretaries ==
On 12 October 1961, the government appointed the Parliamentary Secretaries on the nomination of the Taoiseach.

Name	Office	Term
Joseph Brennan	Government Chief Whip; Parliamentary Secretary to the Minister for Defence	1961–1965
Donogh O'Malley	Parliamentary Secretary to the Minister for Finance	1961–1965
Brian Lenihan	Parliamentary Secretary to the Minister for Justice; Parliamentary Secretary to the Minister for Lands	1961–1964
=== Change 21 October 1964 === Appointment of Brian Lenihan to government.
Name	Office	Term
George Colley	Parliamentary Secretary to the Minister for Lands	1964–1965

== Confidence in the government ==
On 30 October 1963, Brendan Corish, leader of the Labour Party, proposed a motion of no confidence in the government after its introduction of the turnover tax. This motion was amended by the government as a motion of confidence, and approved by a vote of 73 to 69.
