= Government of the 14th Dáil =

Irish government from 1951 to 1954

6th government of Ireland
- Government of Ireland

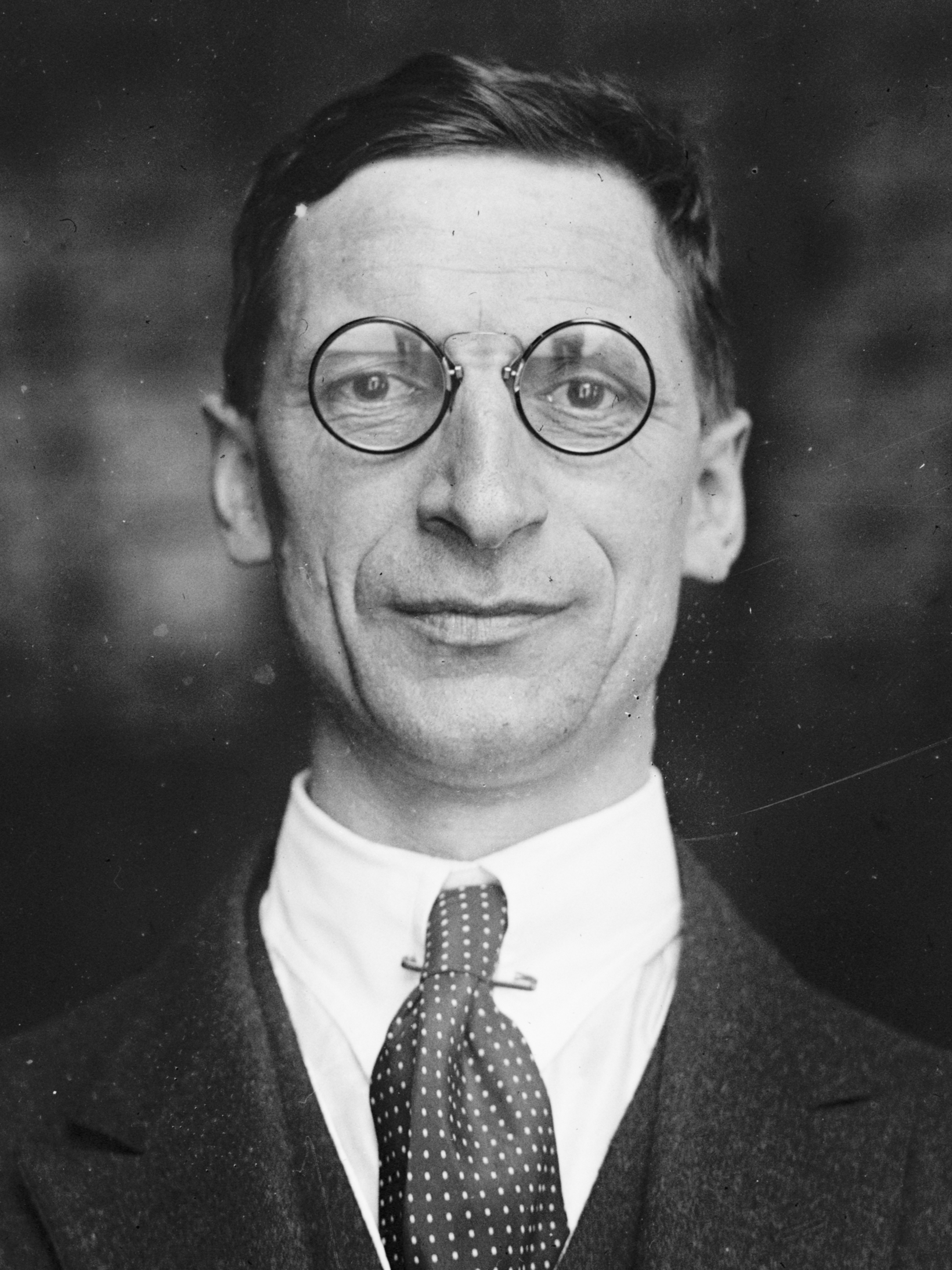
- Date formed: 13 June 1951
- Date dissolved: 2 June 1954

People and organisations
- President: Seán T. O'Kelly
- Taoiseach: Éamon de Valera
- Tánaiste: Seán Lemass
- Total no. of members: 12
- Member party: Fianna Fáil
- Status in legislature: Minority with Independent support 69 / 147 (47%)
- Opposition party: Fine Gael
- Opposition leader: John A. Costello

History
- Election: 1951 general election
- Legislature terms: 14th Dáil; 7th Seanad
- Predecessor: 5th government
- Successor: 7th government

The 6th government of Ireland (13 June 1951 – 2 June 1954) was the government of Ireland formed after the 1951 general election held on 30 May to the 14th Dáil. It was a single-party Fianna Fáil government led by Éamon de Valera as Taoiseach. It lasted for 2 years, 354 days.

== Nomination of Taoiseach ==
The 14th Dáil first met on 13 June 1951. In the debate on the nomination of Taoiseach, outgoing Taoiseach John A. Costello of Fine Gael and Fianna Fáil leader Éamon de Valera were both proposed. Costello was defeated by a vote of 72 to 74, while de Valera was approved by a vote of 74 to 69. De Valera was appointed as Taoiseach by President Seán T. O'Kelly.

13 June 1951; Nomination of Éamon de Valera (FF) as Taoiseach; Motion proposed by Seán Lemass and seconded by Seán Moylan; Absolute majority: 74/147
Vote	Parties	Votes
Yes	Fianna Fáil (69), Independent (5)	74 / 147
No	Fine Gael (40), Labour Party (15), Clann na Talmhan (6), Clann na Poblachta (2), Independent (6)	69 / 147
Not voting	Ceann Comhairle (1), Independent (3)	4 / 147

== Members of the Government ==
After his appointment as Taoiseach by the president, de Valera proposed the members of the government and they were approved by the Dáil. They were appointed by the president on 14 June 1951.

Office	Name
Taoiseach	Éamon de Valera
Tánaiste	Seán Lemass
Minister for Industry and Commerce	Seán Lemass
Minister for Finance	Seán MacEntee
Minister for Health	James Ryan
Minister for Social Welfare	James Ryan
Minister for External Affairs	Frank Aiken
Minister for Lands	Thomas Derrig
Minister for Justice	Gerald Boland
Minister for Defence	Oscar Traynor
Minister for Education	Seán Moylan
Minister for Agriculture	Thomas Walsh
Minister for Posts and Telegraphs	Erskine H. Childers
Minister for Local Government	Paddy Smith

== Parliamentary secretaries ==
On 19 June 1951, the government appointed the parliamentary secretaries on the nomination of the Taoiseach.

Name	Office
Donnchadh Ó Briain	Government Chief Whip; Parliamentary Secretary to the Minister for Defence
Jack Lynch	Parliamentary Secretary to the Government
Patrick Beegan	Parliamentary Secretary to the Minister for Finance
Michael Kennedy	Parliamentary Secretary to the Minister for Social Welfare
Gerald Bartley	Parliamentary Secretary to the Minister for Agriculture
=== Change 5 November 1951 === Additional appointment
Name	Office
Jack Lynch	Parliamentary Secretary to the Minister for Lands

== Confidence in the government ==
On 30 June 1953, de Valera proposed a vote of confidence in the government. On 2 July, it was approved on a vote of 73 to 71.
