= 1968 Irish constitutional referendums =

Two referendums, related to the Third and Fourth Amendment of the Constitution Bills, were held in Ireland on 16 October 1968, each on a proposed amendment of the Irish constitution relating to the electoral system. Both proposals were rejected.

The Third Amendment of the Constitution of Ireland Bill 1968 define the apportionment of constituency boundaries in a manner which would have allowed a greater degree of divergence of the ratio between population and constituencies.

The Fourth Amendment of the Constitution of Ireland Bill 1968 proposed to alter the electoral system for elections to Dáil Éireann from proportional representation by means of the Single transferable vote to the First-past-the-post voting system.

== Background ==
Elections to Dáil Éireann, the house of representatives in the Oireachtas, are governed by Article 16 of the Constitution.

In 1959, the Fianna Fáil government of Éamon de Valera put the Third Amendment of the Constitution Bill to a referendum, which proposed to replace the electoral system of proportional representation by means of the single transferable vote (PR-STV) with first-past-the-post (FPTP). The referendum was defeated by 51.8% to 48.8%, on the same day on which de Valera had won the presidential election.

John O'Donovan, a former Fine Gael TD, challenged the Electoral (Amendment) Act 1959, which had been proposed by a previous Fianna Fáil government, on the basis that there were "grave inequalities" with "no relevant circumstances to justify" them. In O'Donovan v. Attorney-General (1961), Gardner Budd held for the High Court that the Act was unconstitutional. The court, interpreting the "so far as it is practicable" condition of the Constitution, suggested a 5% variation as the limit without exceptional circumstances.

In 1968, the Fianna Fáil government of Jack Lynch proposed two constitutional amendments on the electoral system for election to Dáil Éireann: the Third Amendment of the Constitution Bill, which would have allowed for greater divergence in the ratio of population to constituencies, and the Fourth Amendment of the Constitution Bill, a second proposal to introduce FPTP voting in single-member constituencies. The opposition parties Fine Gael and Labour Party described the two bills in 1968 as a combined attempt by Fianna Fáil to rig the electoral system in its favour.

== Oireachtas debate ==
The third bill was proposed in the Dáil by Taoiseach Jack Lynch on 21 February 1968. It passed its Second Reading on 3 April by 72 votes to 59. It passed final stages in the Dáil on 20 June. On 30 July 1968, it passed final stages in the Seanad by 26 votes to 17. Referendums on both the Third Amendment Bill and the Fourth Amendment Bill were held on 16 October 1968.

The fourth bill to amend the constitution was also proposed by Lynch on 21 February 1968. It was opposed by Fine Gael and the Labour Party. On 3 July, it passed final stages in the Dáil by 66 to 56. On 30 July 1968, it passed final stages in the Seanad by 25 to 18.

== Proposed changes to the text ==
The third bill proposed to change the text of Article 16.2.3° from:

The ratio between the number of members to be elected at any time for each constituency and the population of each constituency, as ascertained at the last preceding census, shall, so far as it is practicable, be the same throughout the country.

to:

A determination of constituencies shall be so effected that if with respect to each of the constituencies, the number of members to be elected for it is divided into its population (as ascertained at the census immediately preceding the determination) none of the quotients shall be greater, or less, than the average obtained by dividing the total population, as ascertained at the immediately preceding census, by the total number of members of Dáil Éireann by more than one-sixth of that average.

A determination of constituencies shall not be effected during a period beginning on the date of a census and ending on the date of the publication of the relevant results (not being provisional results) thereof, and, if the latest time for effecting such a determination falls during such a period and the determination is not effected before the period begins, it shall, notwithstanding anything in this Article, be effected as soon as may be after the period ends.

Subject to the foregoing requirement of this sub-section, regard shall be had at a determination of constituencies to the extent and accessibility of constituencies and the need for securing convenient areas of representation and, subject to those considerations, to the desirability of avoiding the overlapping by constituencies of the boundaries of Administrative Counties (other than boundaries between those Counties and County Boroughs).

== Voter information ==
In the information supplied to voters, the subject matter of the referendum was described as follows:

The Third Amendment of the Constitution Bill, 1968, proposes – that in forming Dáil constituencies, the population per deputy in any case may not be greater or less than the national average by more than one-sixth and that regard must be had to the extent and accessibility of constituencies, the need for having convenient areas of representation and the desirability of avoiding the over-lapping of county boundaries.

The Fourth Amendment of the Constitution Bill, 1968, proposes –
1. To substitute for the present system of voting at Dáil elections the "straight vote" system in single-member constituencies;
2. To establish a Commission to determine constituencies, subject to the right of the Dáil to amend the constituencies as so determined; and
3. To provide that whenever the Dáil is dissolved the outgoing Ceann Comhairle may be returned, without a contest, as a second deputy for a constituency chosen by him which consists of, or includes a part of, the constituency he represented before the dissolution.

== Result ==
=== Third amendment bill ===
Third Amendment of the Constitution of Ireland Bill 1968
Choice	Votes	%
For	424,185	39.24
Against	656,803	60.76
Total	1,080,988	100.00
Valid votes	1,080,988	95.71
Invalid/blank votes	48,489	4.29
Total votes	1,129,477	100.00
Registered voters/turnout	1,717,389	65.77

Results by constituency

Results by constituency
Constituency	Electorate	Turnout (%)	Votes		Proportion of votes	
Constituency	Electorate	Turnout (%)	Yes	No	Yes	No
Carlow–Kilkenny	58,039	71.4%	15,552	23,397	39.9%	60.1%
Cavan	33,996	70.8%	9,706	13,225	42.3%	57.7%
Clare	48,008	62.7%	14,323	13,996	50.6%	49.4%
Cork Borough	59,607	66.2%	14,954	23,229	39.2%	60.8%
Cork Mid	51,423	72.2%	14,446	21,326	40.4%	59.6%
Cork North-East	59,515	70.9%	16,789	23,649	41.5%	58.5%
Cork South-West	34,625	69.9%	8,823	14,121	38.5%	61.5%
Donegal North-East	34,698	66.6%	11,440	10,658	51.8%	48.2%
Donegal South-West	35,596	62.2%	10,744	10,340	51.0%	49.0%
Dublin County	77,837	63.4%	15,755	32,073	32.9%	67.1%
Dublin North-Central	37,771	57.9%	5,804	15,353	27.4%	72.6%
Dublin North-East	80,453	65.9%	15,888	36,150	30.5%	69.5%
Dublin North-West	41,984	61.0%	7,429	17,656	29.6%	70.4%
Dublin South-Central	52,371	57.6%	8,407	20,696	28.9%	71.1%
Dublin South-East	41,190	63.9%	7,557	18,240	29.3%	70.7%
Dublin South-West	57,590	59.6%	9,726	23,633	29.2%	70.8%
Dún Laoghaire and Rathdown	62,723	63.4%	11,677	27,349	29.9%	70.1%
Galway East	53,105	62.6%	14,716	16,643	46.9%	53.1%
Galway West	33,722	52.7%	8,652	8,477	50.5%	49.5%
Kerry North	34,785	64.1%	9,264	11,880	43.8%	56.2%
Kerry South	35,323	66.1%	10,706	11,535	48.1%	51.9%
Kildare	46,099	66.9%	11,607	17,906	39.3%	60.7%
Laois–Offaly	55,879	66.9%	14,163	21,345	39.9%	60.1%
Limerick East	46,883	67.2%	11,245	18,701	37.6%	62.4%
Limerick West	33,546	72.4%	11,253	11,905	48.6%	51.4%
Longford–Westmeath	43,795	67.8%	10,714	17,309	38.2%	61.8%
Louth	37,781	66.9%	9,738	14,495	40.2%	59.8%
Mayo North	30,802	53.8%	7,220	8,497	45.9%	54.1%
Mayo South	41,324	62.2%	10,604	13,963	43.2%	56.8%
Meath	36,192	68.5%	9,499	14,037	40.4%	59.6%
Monaghan	32,580	69.8%	8,744	12,862	40.5%	59.5%
Roscommon	42,971	69.2%	11,637	16,243	41.7%	58.3%
Sligo–Leitrim	42,362	65.8%	11,101	15,000	42.5%	57.5%
Tipperary North	34,076	70.9%	9,606	13,179	42.2%	57.8%
Tipperary South	46,045	74.0%	14,803	17,534	45.8%	54.2%
Waterford	37,519	69.7%	10,360	14,551	41.6%	58.4%
Wexford	48,050	69.6%	11,433	20,542	35.8%	64.2%
Wicklow	37,124	65.3%	8,100	15,108	34.9%	65.1%
Total	1,717,389	65.8%	424,185	656,803	39.2%	60.8%

=== Fourth amendment bill ===
Fourth Amendment of the Constitution of Ireland Bill 1968
Choice	Votes	%
For	423,496	39.16
Against	657,898	60.84
Total	1,081,394	100.00
Valid votes	1,081,394	95.73
Invalid/blank votes	48,212	4.27
Total votes	1,129,606	100.00
Registered voters/turnout	1,717,389	65.77

Results by constituency

Results by constituency
Constituency	Electorate	Turnout (%)	Votes		Proportion of votes	
Constituency	Electorate	Turnout (%)	Yes	No	Yes	No
Carlow–Kilkenny	58,039	71.4%	15,253	23,174	39.7%	60.3%
Cavan	33,996	70.7%	9,710	13,318	42.2%	57.8%
Clare	48,008	62.6%	14,193	14,131	50.1%	49.9%
Cork Borough	59,607	66.3%	14,784	23,448	38.7%	61.3%
Cork Mid	51,423	72.2%	14,337	21,440	40.1%	59.9%
Cork North-East	59,515	70.9%	16,784	23,659	41.5%	58.5%
Cork South-West	34,625	69.9%	8,691	14,281	37.8%	62.2%
Donegal North-East	34,698	66.7%	11,414	10,701	51.6%	48.4%
Donegal South-West	35,596	62.2%	10,692	10,397	50.7%	49.3%
Dublin County	77,837	63.3%	15,820	31,999	33.1%	66.9%
Dublin North-Central	37,771	57.9%	5,877	15,187	27.9%	72.1%
Dublin North-East	80,453	65.9%	16,147	36,010	31.0%	69.0%
Dublin North-West	41,984	61.1%	7,467	17,633	29.7%	70.3%
Dublin South-Central	52,371	57.6%	8,449	20,790	28.9%	71.1%
Dublin South-East	41,190	63.9%	7,726	18,044	30.0%	70.0%
Dublin South-West	57,590	59.6%	9,667	23,780	28.9%	71.1%
Dún Laoghaire and Rathdown	62,723	63.4%	11,875	27,135	30.4%	69.6%
Galway East	53,105	62.6%	14,713	16,708	46.8%	53.2%
Galway West	33,722	52.7%	8,606	8,574	50.1%	49.9%
Kerry North	34,785	64.1%	9,246	11,887	43.8%	56.2%
Kerry South	35,323	66.1%	10,698	11,605	48.0%	52.0%
Kildare	46,099	66.9%	11,560	17,883	39.3%	60.7%
Laois–Offaly	55,879	66.9%	14,128	21,433	39.7%	60.3%
Limerick East	46,883	67.3%	11,190	18,793	37.3%	62.7%
Limerick West	33,546	72.4%	11,272	11,908	48.6%	51.4%
Longford–Westmeath	43,795	67.8%	10,674	17,414	38.0%	62.0%
Louth	37,781	66.9%	9,785	14,453	40.4%	59.6%
Mayo North	30,802	53.8%	7,167	8,556	45.6%	54.4%
Mayo South	41,324	62.2%	10,513	14,025	42.8%	57.2%
Meath	36,192	68.5%	9,500	14,084	40.3%	59.7%
Monaghan	32,580	69.8%	8,645	12,925	40.1%	59.9%
Roscommon	42,971	69.2%	11,635	16,299	41.7%	58.3%
Sligo–Leitrim	42,362	65.8%	11,034	15,097	42.2%	57.8%
Tipperary North	34,076	71.0%	9,600	13,217	42.1%	57.9%
Tipperary South	46,045	74.0%	14,749	17,712	45.4%	54.6%
Waterford	37,519	69.8%	10,353	14,555	41.6%	58.4%
Wexford	48,050	69.6%	11,411	20,588	35.7%	64.3%
Wicklow	37,124	65.3%	8,131	15,055	35.1%	64.9%
Total	1,717,389	65.8%	423,496	657,898	39.2%	60.8%

== See also ==
- Constitutional amendment
- Politics of the Republic of Ireland
- History of the Republic of Ireland
