= Fianna Fáil =

Irish political party

Fianna Fáil – The Republican Party Fianna Fáil – An Páirtí Poblachtánach
- Leader: Micheál Martin
- Deputy leader: Jack Chambers
- General Secretary: Seán Dorgan
- Chairperson: Brendan Smith
- Seanad leader: Fiona O'Loughlin
- Founder: Éamon de Valera
- Founded: 16 May 1926; 100 years ago
- Split from: Sinn Féin
- Headquarters: 65–66 Mount Street Lower, Dublin, Ireland
- Youth wing: Ógra Fianna Fáil
- LGBT wing: Fianna Fáil LGBTQI+ Network
- Membership (2024): ▼15,000
- Ideology: Conservatism; Christian democracy; Irish republicanism
- Political position: Centre to centre-right
- European affiliation: Alliance of Liberals and Democrats for Europe
- European Parliament group: Renew Europe
- International affiliation: Liberal International
- Colours: Green
- Anthem: "We'll Be There"
- Dáil Éireann: 48 / 174
- Seanad Éireann: 19 / 60
- European Parliament: 4 / 14
- Councillors: 246 / 949

Website
- fiannafail.ie
- Politics of the Republic of Ireland; Political parties; Elections; Politics of Northern Ireland; Political parties; Elections; a: previously a member of the Alliance for Europe of the Nations (2002–09) b: Member of the EPD group from 1973 to 1984, the EDA group from 1984 to 1995, the UfE group from 1995 to 1999, the UEN group from 1999 to 2009, and the ALDE group from 2009 to 2014.

Fianna Fáil (/ˌfiː(ə)nə ˈfɔɪl, -ˈfɔːl/; Irish: [ˌfʲiən̪ˠə ˈfˠaːlʲ]; meaning 'Soldiers of Destiny' or 'Warriors of Fál'), officially Fianna Fáil – The Republican Party (Irish: Fianna Fáil – An Páirtí Poblachtánach), is a centre to centre-right and conservative-liberal political party in Ireland.

Fianna Fáil was founded as a republican party in 1926 by Éamon de Valera and his supporters after they split from Sinn Féin in order to take seats in the Oireachtas, which Sinn Féin refused to recognise. Since 1927, Fianna Fáil has been one of Ireland's two major parties, along with Fine Gael since 1933; both are seen as centre-right parties, to the right of the Labour Party and Sinn Féin. The party dominated Irish political life for most of the 20th century, and, since its foundation, either it or Fine Gael has led every government. Between 1932 and 2011, it was the largest party in Dáil Éireann, but latterly with a decline in its vote share; from 1989 onwards, its periods of government were in coalition with parties of either the left or the right.

Fianna Fáil's vote collapsed in the 2011 general election; it ended in third place, in what was widely seen as a political realignment in the wake of the post-2008 Irish economic downturn. By 2016, it had recovered enough to become the largest opposition party, and it entered a confidence and supply arrangement with a Fine Gael–led minority government. In 2020, after a number of months of political stalemate following the general election, Fianna Fáil agreed with Fine Gael and the Green Party to enter into an unprecedented coalition, with the leaders of Fianna Fáil and Fine Gael rotating between the roles of Taoiseach and Tánaiste.

Fianna Fáil is a member of the Alliance of Liberals and Democrats for Europe, and of Liberal International. From 2019 to 2022, Fianna Fáil was in partnership with the Social Democratic and Labour Party in Northern Ireland.

== History ==
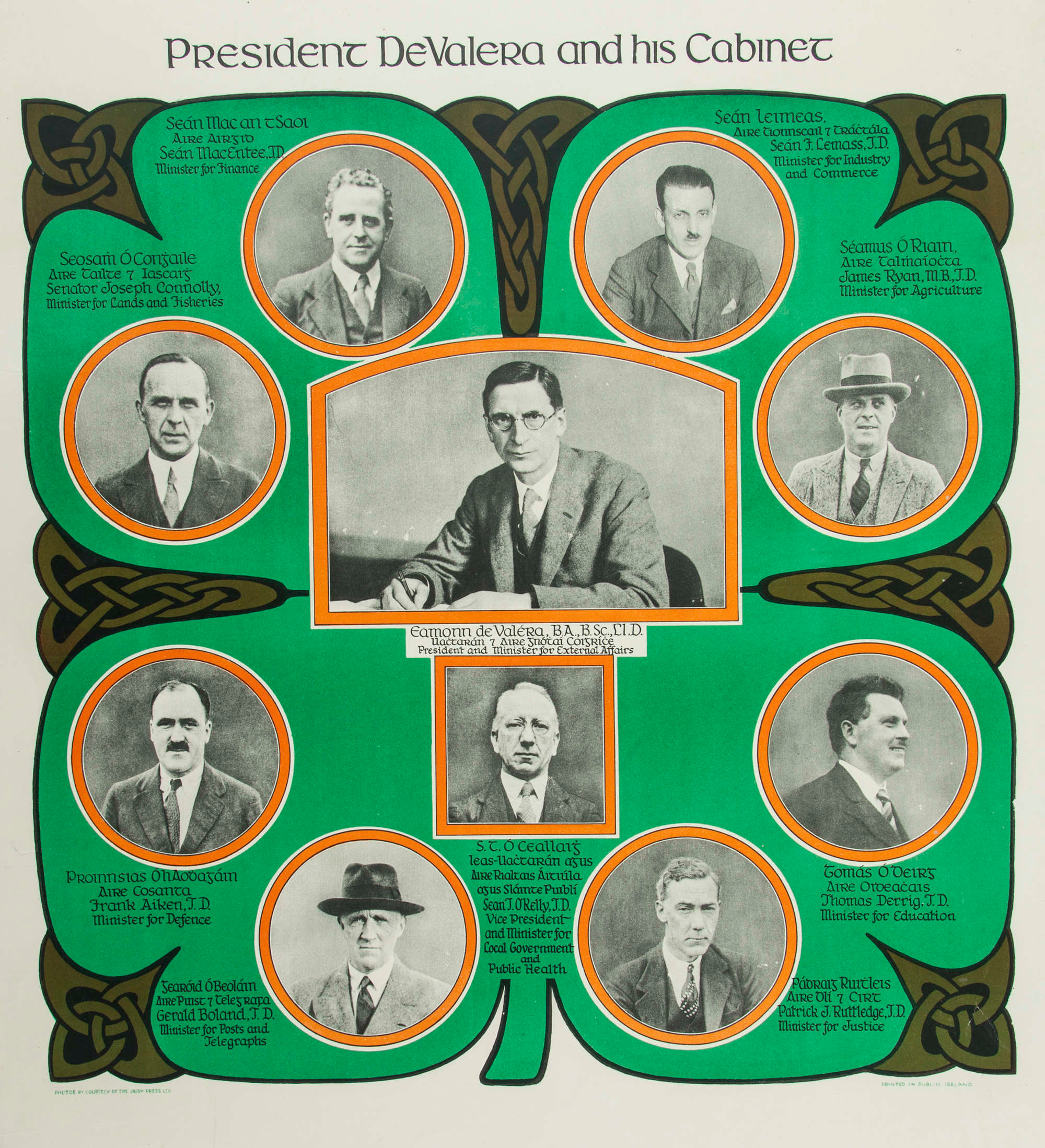
1932 Fianna Fáil poster featuring many of the founding members of the party such as de Valera, Lemass, Aiken and Boland

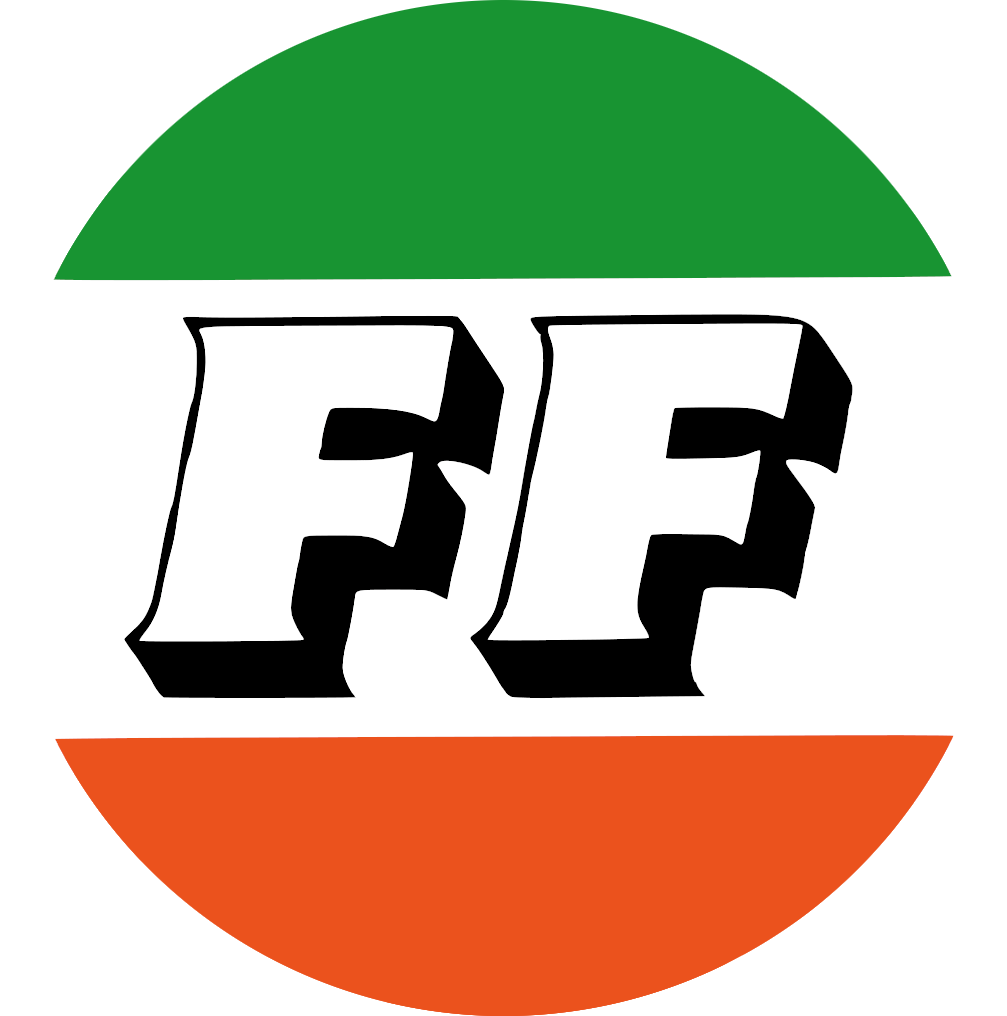
Logo of Fianna Fáil in the 1970s and 1980s

Fianna Fáil was founded by Éamon de Valera, a former leader of Sinn Féin. The previous year, de Valera proposed a motion calling for elected members to be allowed to take their seats in Dáil Éireann if and when the controversial Oath of Allegiance was removed. It failed to pass at the Sinn Féin Ard Fheis, leading de Valera and a number of other members, including most of Sinn Féin's parliamentary talent, to split from Sinn Féin. His new party adopted its name on 2 April of the same year. While it was also opposed to the Treaty settlement, it rejected abstentionism, instead aiming to republicanise the Irish Free State from within. Fianna Fáil's platform of economic autarky had appeal among the farmers, working-class people and the poor, while alienating more affluent classes. It largely pre-empted voters of the aforementioned groups from the Labour Party (with its almost identical economic and social policy) following its entry into the Dáil in 1927. Fianna Fáil would go on to style themselves for several decades as "the real Labour Party".

The split within Sinn Féin on the Anglo-Irish Treaty resulted in pro-Treaty and anti-Treaty Sinn Féin factions running in the 1922 general election. There was a clear victory for the pro-Treaty side, which went on to form Cumann na nGaedheal. Anti-Treaty Sinn Féin competed in the subsequent 1923 election as 'Republicans'. The split between what would become Fianna Fáil and Fine Gael possibly has deeper roots than the Treaty, however, and reflects a deeper tension within Irish nationalism that was obvious throughout the 19th century. There was a difference between constitutional Irish nationalism and a more violent Gaelic nationalism, which in turn, according to a study of political representatives' surnames, could be based on patterns of migration from as far back as the 12th century.

Cumann na nGaedheal sought to exploit the notion that Fianna Fáil was a party in thrall to communists. During the 1932 general election campaign, Cumann na nGaedheal declared in a newspaper advert that "the gunmen and Communists are voting for Fianna Fáil today – vote for the Government party." However, Fianna Fáil won the election, forming its first government on 9 March 1932. It was in power for 61 of the 79 years between then and the election of 2011. Its longest continuous period in office was its first, 15 years and 11 months (March 1932 – February 1948). Its longest single period out of office in the 20th century was four years and four months (March 1973 – July 1977). All of the party's leaders have served as Taoiseach.

The party's most dominant era was the 41-year period between 1932 and 1973, when party leaders Éamon de Valera, Seán Lemass and Jack Lynch served as Taoiseach in an almost unbroken chain save for two three-year stints by Fine Gael's John A. Costello. De Valera's reign is acknowledged for having successfully guided Ireland through World War II unscathed but is criticised for leaving Ireland in economic and cultural stagnation. His successors such as Lemass, however, were able to turn around Ireland's economic fortunes as well as prime the country for entry into the European Economic Community, later the European Union.

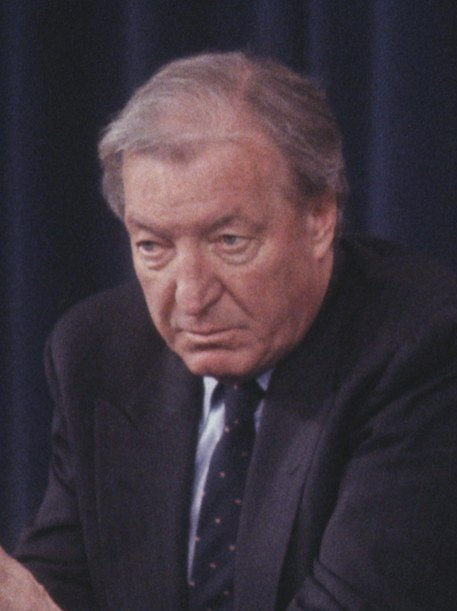
Charles Haughey, party leader from 1979 to 1992.

Fianna Fáil's fortunes began to falter in the 1970s and 1980s. In 1970 the Arms Crisis threatened to split the entire party in two when Fianna Fáil cabinet ministers Charles Haughey and Neil Blaney were dismissed by Jack Lynch after being accused of seeking to provide arms to the newly emergent Provisional Irish Republican Army. Factional infighting over Northern Ireland, economics and the "moral issues" such as the legalization of divorce, abortion, and contraception plagued the party in this era and grew particularly intense when Charles Haughey later became party leader. Under Haughey, Fianna Fáil lost both the 1981 general election and November 1982 general election to Garret FitzGerald's Fine Gael during a particularly chaotic time in Ireland's political and economic history. Numerous failed internal attempts to oust Haughey as leader of the party culminated in the most significant split in the party's history when a large portion of the membership walked out to create the Progressive Democrats in 1985, under the leadership of Haughey archrival Desmond O'Malley. Haughey was forced to resign as Taoiseach and party leader in 1992 following revelations about his role in a phone tapping scandal.

Although the two parties had seemed poised to be bitter enemies owing to the personal conflicts between the memberships, from 1989 onwards Fianna Fáil and the Progressive Democrats served repeatedly in coalition governments together, helping to stabilise Fianna Fáil. In 1994 Fianna Fáil came under the new leadership of Haughey protégé Bertie Ahern, who also became Taoiseach in 1997. Under Ahern, Fianna Fáil was able to claim credit for helping to broker the Good Friday Agreement in 1998 which began the peace process in Northern Ireland, as well the economic upswing caused by the Celtic Tiger which saw Ireland's economy boom during the 2000s. However, this momentum came to a sharp and sudden halt following two events. Firstly, Ahern was forced to resign as Taoiseach and left the party in 2008 following revelations made in the Mahon Tribunal that Ahern had accepted money from property developers. Secondly, the party, which was still in government under a new leader and Taoiseach Brian Cowen, was held responsible for the effects of the post-2008 Irish economic downturn. The party's popularity crashed: an opinion poll on 27 February 2009 indicated that only 10% of voters were satisfied with the Government's performance.

In the 2011 general election, it suffered the worst defeat of a sitting government in the history of the Irish state. This loss was described as "historic" in its proportions and "unthinkable". The party sank from being the largest in the Dáil to the third-largest, losing 58 of its 78 seats. This broke 79 consecutive years of Fianna Fáil being the largest single party in the Dáil. That election took place with Micheál Martin as leader, as Cowen had resigned as party leader in January 2011, although retained his role as Taoiseach until the election. Cowen's premiership was sharply criticised in the media, with The Sunday Times describing Cowen's tenure as Taoiseach as "a dismal failure" and in 2011 the Irish Independent calling Cowen the "worst Taoiseach in the history of the State."

=== Since 2011 ===
Party logo until 2024

Martin continued to lead Fianna Fáil past 2011; In the 2016 general election Martin's Fianna Fáil made a moderate recovery while Fine Gael retained control of the government as a minority government, made possible by a confidence and supply agreement with Fianna Fáíl.

In 2018 the party was divided internally over how to handle that year's referendum on the Eighth Amendment, the provision in the Irish constitution which forbade abortion. A significant portion of both the parliamentary party and the ordinary membership favoured a No vote, which would keep abortion illegal for non–life-threatening pregnancies. Leader Micheál Martin signalled his own desire for a Yes vote, but was unable to bring the party under one stance, and ultimately more than half of Fianna Fáil's TDs campaigned for a No vote. On polling day the Yes side won, 66% to 33%.

After the 2020 general election, for the first time in history, Fianna Fáil entered into a coalition government with its traditional rival Fine Gael, as well as the Green Party, ending its longest period out of government since its formation. Under the agreement, Fianna Fáil leader Micheál Martin served as Taoiseach for the first half of the parliamentary term. That same year a number of Fianna Fáil members were involved in the "Golfgate" scandal, an event that ultimately led to the resignation of Fianna Fáil deputy leader Dara Calleary. In July 2021 Fianna Fáil suffered what a number of sources suggested might have been the single worst result in its history when the party polled extremely poorly in the 2021 Dublin Bay South by-election. The result prompted Jim O'Callaghan and Cathal Crowe to question whether Martin should lead the party into its next general election. In February 2023, former leader Bertie Ahern rejoined the party, having left in 2012. Over the course of 2024, several sitting Fianna Fáil councillors and former party members left to join the right-wing Independent Ireland party.

Following the 2024 Irish general election, Fianna Fáil became the largest party in the Dáil and led the creation of a government.

== Organisation and structure ==
Fianna Fáil uses a structure called a cumann system. The basic unit was the cumann (branch); these were grouped into comhairlí ceantair (district branches) and a comhairle dáil ceantair (constituency branch) in every constituency. The party claimed that in 2005 they had 50,000 registered names, but only an estimated 10,000–15,000 members were considered active.

However, from the early 1990s onward, the cumann structure was weakened. Every cumann was entitled to three votes to selection conventions irrespective of its size; hence, a large number of cumainn had become in effect "paper cumainn", the only use of which was to ensure an aspiring or sitting candidate got enough votes. Although this phenomenon was nothing new (the most famous example being Neil Blaney's "Donegal Mafia").

Since the 2007 election, the party's structure has significantly weakened. This was in part exacerbated by significant infighting between candidates in the run-up to the 2011 general election. The Irish Times estimated that half of its 3,000 cumainn were effectively moribund. This fraction rose in Dublin with the exception of Dublin West, the former seat of both Brian Lenihan Snr and Brian Lenihan Jnr.

== Ideology and platform ==
Fianna Fáil is primarily cited as being on the centre or centre-right of the political spectrum. (Note: The party has been described as anywhere from centre-left to right-wing.) Fianna Fáil's ideology has been characterised both as conservative and ambiguous or malleable. The party has also been ideologically described as centrist, Christian democratic, liberal-conservative, populist, conservative-liberal, socially conservative, liberal, national-liberal and national-conservative. In 2017, academics Eoin O'Malley and Sean McGraw wrote that Fianna Fáil "appears centrist, conservative, and attached to the state", but that there was "deep ambiguity concerning what type of party Fianna Fáil really is".

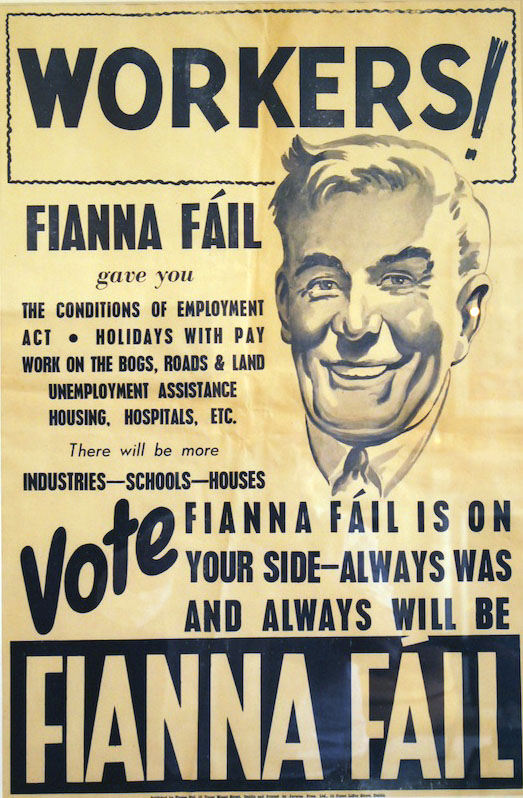
Fianna Fáil poster from the 1948 general election

In the modern era, Fianna Fáil is seen as a typical catch-all party and has defined itself as such. It has presented itself as a "broad church" and attracted support from across disparate social classes. In the 1980s, Brian Lenihan Snr declared "there are no isms or [ide]ologies in my party"; further, in the early 2000s, Fianna Fáil leader Bertie Ahern affirmed the party's catch-all stance by defining Fianna Fáil as a party that "looks out for the small ranking guy, the middle-ranking guy and assists the big guy". In 2023, party leader Micheál Martin described Fianna Fáil as "a progressive republican party which rejects the failed and destructive idea that you must conform to the traditional left/right ideology".

Between 1989 and 2011, Fianna Fáil led coalition governments with parties of both the left and the right. Fianna Fáil's platform contains a number of enduring commitments: to Irish unity; to the promotion and protection of the Irish language; and to maintaining Ireland's tradition of military neutrality. The party's name and logo incorporates the words "The Republican Party". According to Fianna Fáil, "Republican here stands both for the unity of the island and a commitment to the historic principles of European republican philosophy, namely liberty, equality and fraternity". The party's main goal at its beginning was to reunite the North and the South.

Fianna Fáil is supportive of the European Union. Although part of the liberal Renew group in the European Parliament, its liberal nature has been disputed. As of 2009, Fianna Fáil did not always support Renew's positions on civil liberties though the party did legalize same-sex civil partnerships in 2010. In 2014, Fianna Fáil expelled MEP Brian Crowley for joining the right-wing European Conservatives and Reformists Group, with the party stating that "the ideas and principles of the ECR group and its component parties are totally incompatible with the core principles of Fianna Fáil". Since 2016, Fianna Fáil has increasingly been seen as divided on social issues, and as moving towards a more social liberal profile. Fianna Fáil supported the unsuccessful 2024 Irish constitutional referendums, which would have deleted a reference to women's domestic duties and broadened the definition of the family.

Evidence from expert surveys, opinion polls and candidate surveys have failed to identify strong distinctions between Fianna Fáil and Fine Gael. Fianna Fáil is generally considered more populist and economically interventionist than its rival. University College Dublin professor Thomas Däubler wrote that Fianna Fáil had "made a move to the centre" in the 2016 election, which resulted in Fine Gael being placed "considerably to the right" of Fianna Fáil. In 2020, Time magazine described Fianna Fáil as "slightly more socially conservative and further to the left on the economy" than Fine Gael. Fianna Fáil has been described in modern times as struggling with its identity as a party. In 2023, Jack Sheehan of The Irish Times wrote that "for a decade now, a socially conservative, supposedly republican party has been led by a centrist social liberal with a more cautious position on Irish unification than even Leo Varadkar."

=== 20th century ===
In the early 20th century, Fianna Fáil had a more explicitly working-class orientation. In 1926, Seán Lemass described the party as "a progressive republican party based on the actual conditions of the moment" while upon winning the 1932 Irish general election, newly elected Fianna Fáil TD Seán Moylan proclaimed that Fianna Fáil's win meant a victory of "the owners of the donkey and cart over the pony and trap class". The Fianna Fáil party of the 1930s has been described as an economically social democratic one that sought to create an economically independent state (autarky) via protectionist policies, based on its culturally nationalist thinking.

During the leadership of Seán Lemass in the 1960s, Fianna Fáil began to utilise some corporatist policies (embracing the concept of 'social partnership'), taking some influence from Catholic social teaching. It was also during Lemass' time that the party shifted heavily away from autarkic thinking and towards a firm belief in free trade and foreign direct investment in Ireland.

In 1967, Jack Lynch described the party as "left of centre" while suggesting it was to the left of Fine Gael and Labour. However, during the 1969 Irish general election, the party ran red scare tactics against Labour after it began using the slogan "the seventies will be socialist!". As Fine Gael became increasingly socially liberal in the 1970s under Garret FitzGerald, the party reacted by embracing social conservatism and populism. In the same time period, the emergence of the Troubles and the Arms Crisis of 1971 tested the party's nationalism, but despite these events, Fianna Fáil maintained their moderate culturally nationalist stance. In 1983, R. Ken Carty wrote of Fianna Fáil and Fine Gael that they were "heterogeneous in their bases of support, relatively undifferentiated in terms of policy or programme, and remarkably stable in their support levels".

In the 1990s, Fianna Fáil was described as a conservative and nationalist party.

== Leadership and president ==
The following are the terms of office as party leader and as Taoiseach:

Leader	Portrait	Period	Constituency	Years as Taoiseach
Éamon de Valera		1926–1959	Clare	1932–1933–1937–1938–1943–1944–1948; 1951–1954; 1957–1959 (6th, 7th, and 8th Executive Council of the Irish Free State, 1st, 2nd, 3rd, 4th, 6th and 8th Government of Ireland)
Seán Lemass		1959–1966	Dublin South-Central	1959–1961–1965–1966 (9th, 10th and 11th Government of Ireland)
Jack Lynch		1966–1979	Cork Borough (1948–1969); Cork City North-West (1969–1977); Cork City (1977–1981)	1966–1969–1973; 1977–1979 (12th, 13th and 15th Government of Ireland)
Charles Haughey		1979–1992	Dublin North-East (1957–1977); Dublin Artane (1977–1981); Dublin North-Central (1981–1992)	1979–1981; Feb 1982 – Nov 1982; 1987–1989–1992 (16th, 18th, 20th and 21st Government of Ireland)
Albert Reynolds		1992–1994	Longford–Roscommon	1992–1992–1994 (22nd and 23rd Government of Ireland)
Bertie Ahern		1994–2008	Dublin Central	1997–2002–2007–2008 (25th, 26th and 27th Government of Ireland)
Brian Cowen		2008–2011	Laois–Offaly	2008–2011 (28th Government of Ireland)
Micheál Martin		2011–present	Cork South-Central	2020–2022; 2025–present (32nd and 35th Government of Ireland)

=== Deputy leader ===
Name	Period	Constituency	Leader
Joseph Brennan	1973–1977	Donegal–Leitrim	Jack Lynch
George Colley	1977–1982	Dublin Central	Jack Lynch Charles Haughey
Ray MacSharry	1982–1983	Sligo–Leitrim	Charles Haughey
Brian Lenihan Snr	1983–1990	Dublin West	Charles Haughey
John Wilson	1990–1992	Cavan–Monaghan	Charles Haughey
Bertie Ahern	1992–1994	Dublin Central	Albert Reynolds
Mary O'Rourke	1995–2002	Longford–Westmeath	Bertie Ahern
Brian Cowen	2002–2008	Laois–Offaly	Bertie Ahern
Mary Coughlan	2008–2011	Donegal South-West	Brian Cowen
Mary Hanafin	2011	Dún Laoghaire	Micheál Martin
Brian Lenihan Jnr	2011	Dublin West	Micheál Martin
Éamon Ó Cuív	2011–2012	Galway West	Micheál Martin
Dara Calleary	2018–2020	Mayo	Micheál Martin
Jack Chambers	2024–present	Dublin West	Micheál Martin

=== Seanad leader ===
Name	Period	Panel
Eoin Ryan Snr	1977–1982	Industrial and Commercial Panel
Mick Lanigan	1982–1990	Industrial and Commercial Panel (1982–89); Nominated member of Seanad Éireann (1989–90)
Seán Fallon	1990–1992	Industrial and Commercial Panel
G. V. Wright	1992–1997	Nominated member of Seanad Éireann
Donie Cassidy	1997–2002	Labour Panel
Mary O'Rourke	2002–2007	Nominated member of Seanad Éireann
Donie Cassidy	2007–2011	Labour Panel
Darragh O'Brien	2011–2016	Labour Panel
Catherine Ardagh	2016–2020	Industrial and Commercial Panel
Lisa Chambers	2020–2025	Cultural and Educational Panel
Fiona O'Loughlin	2025–present	Administrative Panel

== Election results ==
Fianna Fáil was the most electorally successful party in 20th-century democratic Europe.

=== Dáil Éireann ===
Election	Leader	FPv	FPv%	Seats	±	Dáil	Government
June 1927	Éamon de Valera	299,486	26.2 (#2)	44 / 153	New	5th	Abstention; 3rd executive (CnG minority)
Sep. 1927	Éamon de Valera	411,777	35.2 (#2)	57 / 153	▲13	6th	Opposition; 4th, 5th executive (CnG-FP minority)
1932	Éamon de Valera	566,498	44.5 (#1)	72 / 153	▲15	7th	Government; 6th executive (FF minority)
1933	Éamon de Valera	689,054	49.7 (#1)	77 / 153	▲5	8th	Government; 7th executive (FF minority)
1937	Éamon de Valera	599,040	45.2 (#1)	69 / 138	▼8	9th	Government; 8th executive, 1st government (FF minority)
1938	Éamon de Valera	667,996	51.9 (#1)	77 / 138	▲8	10th	Government; 2nd government (FF majority)
1943	Éamon de Valera	557,525	41.9 (#1)	67 / 138	▼10	11th	Government; 3rd government (FF minority)
1944	Éamon de Valera	595,259	48.9 (#1)	76 / 138	▲9	12th	Government; 4th government (FF majority)
1948	Éamon de Valera	553,914	41.9 (#1)	68 / 147	▼8	13th	Opposition; 5th government (FG-Lab-CnP-CnT- NL-MR-Ind majority)
1951	Éamon de Valera	616,212	46.3 (#1)	69 / 147	▲1	14th	Government; 6th government (FF minority)
1954	Éamon de Valera	578,960	43.4 (#1)	65 / 147	▼4	15th	Opposition; 7th government (FG-Lab-CnT minority)
1957	Éamon de Valera	592,994	48.3 (#1)	78 / 147	▲13	16th	Government; 8th, 9th government (FF majority)
1961	Seán Lemass	512,073	43.8 (#1)	70 / 144	▼8	17th	Government; 10th government (FF minority)
1965	Seán Lemass	597,414	47.7 (#1)	72 / 144	▲2	18th	Government; 11th, 12th government (FF majority)
1969	Jack Lynch	602,234	45.7 (#1)	75 / 144	▲3	19th	Government; 13th government (FF majority)
1973	Jack Lynch	624,528	46.2 (#1)	69 / 144	▼6	20th	Opposition; 14th government (FG-Lab majority)
1977	Jack Lynch	811,615	50.6 (#1)	84 / 148	▲15	21st	Government; 15th, 16th government (FF majority)
1981	Charles Haughey	777,616	45.3 (#1)	78 / 166	▼6	22nd	Opposition; 17th government (FG-Lab minority)
Feb. 1982	Charles Haughey	786,951	47.3 (#1)	81 / 166	▲3	23rd	Government; 18th government (FF minority)
Nov. 1982	Charles Haughey	763,313	45.2 (#1)	75 / 166	▼6	24th	Opposition; 19th government (FG-Lab majority)
1987	Charles Haughey	784,547	44.1 (#1)	81 / 166	▲6	25th	Government; 20th government (FF minority)
1989	Charles Haughey	731,472	44.1 (#1)	77 / 166	▼4	26th	Government; 21st, 22nd government (FF-PD majority)
1992	Albert Reynolds	674,650	39.1 (#1)	68 / 166	▼9	27th	Government; 23rd government (FF-Lab majority)
1992	Albert Reynolds	674,650	39.1 (#1)	68 / 166	▼9	27th	Opposition; 24th government (FG-Lab-DL majority)
1997	Bertie Ahern	703,682	39.3 (#1)	77 / 166	▲9	28th	Government; 25th government (FF-PD minority)
2002	Bertie Ahern	770,748	41.5 (#1)	81 / 166	▲4	29th	Government; 26th government (FF-PD majority)
2007	Bertie Ahern	858,565	41.6 (#1)	77 / 166	▼4	30th	Government; 27th, 28th government (FF-GP-PD/Ind majority)
2011	Micheál Martin	387,358	17.5 (#3)	20 / 166	▼57	31st	Opposition; 29th government (FG-Lab majority)
2016	Micheál Martin	519,356	24.3 (#2)	44 / 158	▲23	32nd	Confidence and supply 30th, 31st government (FG-Ind minority)
2020	Micheál Martin	484,315	22.2 (#2)	38 / 160	▼6	33rd	Government; 32nd, 33rd, 34th government (FF-FG-GP majority)
2024	Micheál Martin	481,417	21.9 (#1)	48 / 174	▲10	34th	Government; 35th government (FF-FG-Ind majority)

=== Presidential elections ===
Election	Nominee	Party	Alliance	1st	Final
1938	Douglas Hyde	IND	Fine Gael; Labour	Unopposed	
1945	Seán T. O'Kelly	FF	—N/a	49.5%	55.5%
1952	Seán T. O'Kelly	IND	—N/a	Unopposed	
1959	Éamon de Valera	FF	—N/a	56.3%	—N/a
1966	Éamon de Valera	FF	—N/a	50.5%	—N/a
1973	Erskine H. Childers	FF	—N/a	52.0%	—N/a
1974	Cearbhall Ó Dálaigh	FF	—N/a	Unopposed	
1976	Patrick Hillery	FF	—N/a	Unopposed	
1983	Patrick Hillery	IND	—N/a	Unopposed	
1990	Brian Lenihan	FF	—N/a	44.1%	46.5%
1997	Mary McAleese	FF	Progressive Democrats	45.2%	55.6%
2004	Mary McAleese	IND	List: Fianna Fáil; Fine Gael; Labour; Progressive Democrats; Green; Sinn Féin	Unopposed	
2011	—N/a				
2018	Michael D. Higgins	IND	List: Fianna Fáil; Fine Gael; Labour; Social Democrats; Green	55.8%	—N/a
2025	Jim Gavin	FF	—N/a	7.2%	—N/a

=== European Parliament ===
Election	Leader	FPv	%	Seats	%	+/−	EP Group	EP Party
1979	Jack Lynch	464,451	34.7 (#1)	5 / 15	33.3 (#1)	New	EPD	—
1984	Charles Haughey	438,946	39.2 (#1)	8 / 15	53.3 (#1)	▲3	EDA	—
1989	Charles Haughey	514,537	31.5 (#1)	6 / 15	40.0 (#1)	▼2	EDA	—
1994	Albert Reynolds	398,066	35.0 (#1)	7 / 15	46.7 (#1)	▲1	UFE	—
1999	Bertie Ahern	537,757	38.6 (#1)	6 / 15	40.0 (#1)	▼1	UEN	AEN
2004	Bertie Ahern	524,504	29.5 (#1)	4 / 13	30.8 (#2)	▼2	UEN	AEN
2009	Brian Cowen	440,562	24.1 (#2)	3 / 12	25.0 (#2)	▼1	ALDE	ALDE
2014	Micheál Martin	369,545	22.3 (#1)	1 / 11	9.1 (#3)	▼2	ALDE	ALDE
2019	Micheál Martin	277,705	16.55 (#2)	2 / 13	15.4 (#2)	▲1	RE	ALDE
2024	Micheál Martin	356,794	20.4 (#2)	4 / 14	28.6 (#1)	▲2	RE	ALDE

== Ógra Fianna Fáil ==
Ógra Fianna Fáil serves as the party's official youth wing.

== Fianna Fáil and Northern Ireland politics ==
On 17 September 2007, Fianna Fáil announced that the party would for the first time organise in Northern Ireland. The Foreign Minister Dermot Ahern was asked to chair a committee on the matter: "In the period ahead Dermot Ahern will lead efforts to develop that strategy for carrying through this policy, examining timescales and structures. We will act gradually and strategically. We are under no illusions. It will not be easy. It will challenge us all. But I am confident we will succeed".

The party embarked on its first ever recruitment drive north of the border in September 2007 in northern universities, and established two 'Political Societies', the William Drennan Cumann in Queens University, Belfast, and the Watty Graham Cumann in UU Magee, Derry, which subsequently became official units of Fianna Fáil's youth wing, attaining full membership and voting rights, and attained official voting delegates at the 2012 Ard Fheis. On 23 February 2008, it was announced that a former Ulster Unionist Party (UUP) councillor, Colonel Harvey Bicker, had joined Fianna Fáil.

Bertie Ahern announced on 7 December 2007 that Fianna Fáil had been registered in Northern Ireland by the UK Electoral Commission. The party's Ard Fheis in 2009 unanimously passed a motion to organise in Northern Ireland by establishing forums, rather than cumainn, in each of its six counties. In December 2009, Fianna Fáil secured its first Northern Ireland Assembly MLA when Gerry McHugh, an independent MLA, announced he had joined the party. Mr. McHugh confirmed that although he had joined the party, he would continue to sit as an independent MLA. In June 2010, Fianna Fáil opened its first official office in Northern Ireland, in Crossmaglen, County Armagh. The Taoiseach Brian Cowen officially opened the office, accompanied by Ministers Éamon Ó Cuív and Dermot Ahern and Deputies Rory O'Hanlon and Margaret Conlon. Discussing the party's slow development towards all-Ireland politics, Mr. Cowen observed: "We have a very open and pragmatic approach. We are a constitutional republican party and we make no secret of the aspirations on which this party was founded. It has always been very clear in our mind what it is we are seeking to achieve, that is to reconcile this country and not being prisoners of our past history. To be part of a generation that will build a new Ireland, an Ireland of which we can all be proud".

Fianna Fáil has not contested any elections in Northern Ireland since its registration and recognition there in 2007. At the party's 2014 Ard Fheis, a motion was passed without debate to stand candidates for election north of the border for the first time in 2019.

Since 24 January 2019, the party have been in partnership with the Social Democratic and Labour Party (SDLP) formerly the main Irish nationalist party in Northern Ireland, but now smaller than Sinn Féin. There had long been speculation about the eventual partnership for several years prior. This was initially met with a negative reaction from Seamus Mallon, former Deputy Leader of the SDLP, who stated he would be opposed to any such merger. Former leader of the SDLP Margaret Ritchie originally stated publicly that she opposed any merger, announcing to the Labour Party Conference that such a merger would not happen on her "watch". On 10 January 2019, Richie stated that she now supported a new partnership with Fianna Fáil.

Both Fianna Fáil and the SDLP currently have shared policies on key areas including addressing the current political situation in Northern Ireland, improving public services in both jurisdictions of Ireland, such as healthcare, housing, education, and governmental reform, and bringing about the further unity and cooperation of the people on the island and arrangements for a future poll on Irish reunification.

In September 2022, SDLP party leader Colum Eastwood announced the end of its partnership with Fianna Fáil, saying that the SDLP needed to move forward by "standing on its own two feet".

== Representation in European institutions ==
Fianna Fáil joined the Alliance of Liberals and Democrats for Europe (ALDE) party on 16 April 2009, and the party's Members of the European Parliament (MEPs) sat in the ALDE Group during the 7th European Parliament term from June 2009 to 1 July 2014. The party is a full member of the Liberal International. Prior to this, the party was part of the Eurosceptic Union for Europe of the Nations parliamentary group between 1999 and 2009.

Party headquarters, over the objections of some MEPs, had made several attempts to sever the party's links to the European right, including an aborted 2004 agreement to join the European Liberal Democrat and Reform (ELDR) Party, with whom it already sat in the Council of Europe under the Alliance of Liberals and Democrats for Europe (ALDE) banner. On 27 February 2009, Taoiseach Brian Cowen announced that Fianna Fáil proposed to join the ELDR Party and intended to sit with them in the Alliance of Liberals and Democrats for Europe (ALDE) Group in the European Parliament after the 2009 European elections.

In October 2009, it was reported that Fianna Fáil had irritated its new Liberal colleagues by failing to vote for the motion on press freedom in Italy (resulting in its defeat by a majority of one in the Parliament) and by trying to scupper their party colleagues' initiative for gay rights. In January 2010, a report by academic experts writing for the votewatch.eu site found that FF "do not seem to toe the political line" of the ALDE Group "when it comes to budget and civil liberties" issues.

In the 2014 European elections, Fianna Fáil received 22.3% of first-preference votes but only returned a single MEP, a reduction in representation of two MEPs from the previous term. This was due to a combination of the party's vote further dropping in Dublin and a two candidate strategy in the Midlands North West constituency, which backfired, resulting in sitting MEP Pat "the Cope" Gallagher losing his seat. On 23 June 2014, returning MEP Brian Crowley announced that he intended to sit with the European Conservatives and Reformists (ECR) rather than the ALDE group during the upcoming 8th term of the European parliament. The following day on 24 June 2014 Crowley had the Fianna Fáil party whip withdrawn. He has since been re-added to Fianna Fáil's website.

In the European Committee of the Regions, Fianna Fáil sits in the Renew Europe CoR group, with three full and two alternate members for the 2025–2030 mandate. Clare Colleran-Molloy is the Coordinator of the ENVE Commission and Gillian Coughlan is a member of the Bureau of the Renew Europe CoR group.

== See also ==
- Fianna Fáil politicians
- List of political parties in Northern Ireland
- List of political parties in the Republic of Ireland
