= Taoiseach =

Head of government of Ireland

- Incumbent; Micheál Martin since 23 January 2025
- Executive branch of the Irish Government; Department of the Taoiseach
- Style: Irish: A Thaoisigh
- Type: Head of government (Note: Article 13.1.1° and Article 28.5.1° of the Constitution of Ireland. The latter provision reads: "The head of the Government, or Prime Minister, shall be called, and is in this Constitution referred to as, the Taoiseach.")
- Member of: Dáil Éireann; Cabinet; Council of State; British–Irish Council; European Council
- Reports to: Oireachtas
- Residence: None (Note: The Taoiseach has no official residence, with each taoiseach residing in their own home. They may use the State Guest House at Steward's Lodge in Phoenix Park for official state functions)
- Seat: Government Buildings, Merrion Street, Dublin, Ireland
- Nominator: Dáil Éireann
- Appointer: President of Ireland
- Term length: While commanding the confidence of the majority of Dáil Éireann. No term limits are imposed on the office.
- Constituting instrument: Article 13, Constitution of Ireland
- Precursor: President of the Executive Council
- Formation: 29 December 1937 (Note: Before the enactment of the 1937 Constitution of Ireland, the head of government was referred to as the President of the Executive Council. This office was first held by W. T. Cosgrave from 1922 to 1932, and then by Éamon de Valera from 1932 to 1937.)
- First holder: Éamon de Valera
- Deputy: Tánaiste
- Salary: €248,773 annually (2025) (including €115,953 TD salary)
- Website: www.gov.ie/en/organisation/department-of-the-taoiseach/

The taoiseach (Note: Pronounced /ˈtiːʃəx/, Irish: [ˈt̪ˠiːʃəx]. The plural Taoisigh is pronounced TEE-she or TEE-shig; /ˈtiːʃi/, Irish: [ˈt̪ˠiːʃiː] or [ˈt̪ˠiːʃiɡ].) is the head of government, or prime minister, of Ireland. The office is appointed by the president of Ireland upon nomination by Dáil Éireann (the lower house of the Oireachtas, Ireland's national legislature) and the office-holder must retain the support of a majority in the Dáil to remain in office.

The Irish word taoiseach means "chief" or "leader", and was adopted in the 1937 Constitution of Ireland as the title of the "head of the Government or Prime Minister". It is the official title of the head of government in both English and Irish, and is not used for the prime ministers of other countries, who are instead referred to in Irish by the generic term príomh-aire. (Note: Pronounced /priːˈvɛərə/, Irish: [ˌpʲɾʲiːw ˈaɾʲə].) The phrase an Taoiseach is sometimes used in an otherwise English-language context, and means the same as "the taoiseach".

The incumbent taoiseach is Micheál Martin, TD, leader of Fianna Fáil, who took office on 23 January 2025, following the 2024 general election and an agreement between Fianna Fáil, Fine Gael and independent TDs.

== Overview ==
Under the Constitution of Ireland, the taoiseach is nominated by a simple majority of the voting members of Dáil Éireann from among the lower house's members. The taoiseach is then formally appointed to office by the president, who is required to appoint whomever the Dáil designates, without the option of declining to make the appointment. For this reason, the taoiseach may informally be said to have been "elected by Dáil Éireann".

If the taoiseach loses the support of a majority in Dáil Éireann, they are not automatically removed from office. Instead, they are compelled either to resign or call a general election. If the president "in his absolute discretion" refuses to grant the election, this effectively forces the taoiseach to resign. To date, no president has ever refused a dissolution, although the option to exercise this prerogative arose in 1944 and 1994, and twice in 1982. The taoiseach may lose the support of Dáil Éireann by the passage of a vote of no confidence, or implicitly, through the failure of a vote of confidence. Alternatively, the Dáil may refuse supply. (Note: The Dáil refused supply in January 1982, when the then Fine Gael–Labour Party coalition government of Garret FitzGerald lost a vote on the budget.) In the event of a resignation, the taoiseach continues to exercise the duties and functions of office until the appointment of a successor.

The taoiseach nominates the remaining members of the government, who are then, with the consent of the Dáil, appointed by the president. The taoiseach may advise the president to dismiss cabinet ministers from office; the president does not have discretion on accepting such advice. The taoiseach is also responsible for appointing eleven members of the sixty members of the upper house of parliament, the Seanad.

The Department of the Taoiseach is the government department which supports and advises the taoiseach in carrying out their various duties. The taoiseach is assisted by one or more ministers of State at the Department of the Taoiseach, one of whom is the government chief whip.

=== Salary ===
The taoiseach's salary is €248,773, as of 2025.

The taoiseach's salary was cut from €214,187 to €200,000 when Enda Kenny took office in 2011 before being cut further to €185,350 under the Haddington Road Agreement in 2013.

A proposed increase of €38,000 in 2007 was deferred when Brian Cowen became taoiseach and in October 2008, the government announced a 10% salary cut for all ministers, including the taoiseach. However this was a voluntary cut and the salaries remained nominally the same with both ministers and taoiseach essentially refusing 10% of their salary. This caused controversy in December 2009 when a salary cut of 20% was based on the higher figure before the refused amount was deducted. The taoiseach is also allowed an additional €134,148 in annual expenses, as of 1 August 2025.

=== Residence ===
There is no official residence of the taoiseach. An attempt in the 1970s to build one in the Phoenix Park was abandoned because of the state of the public finances and the new Taoiseach, Charles Haughey, already had a mansion in the vicinity of Dublin city. In 2008 it was reported speculatively that the former Steward's Lodge at Farmleigh adjoining the Phoenix Park would become the official residence of the Taoiseach. However, no official statements were made nor any action taken. The house, which forms part of the Farmleigh estate acquired by the State in 1999 for €29.2 million, was renovated at a cost of nearly €600,000 in 2005 by the Office of Public Works. Former Taoiseach Bertie Ahern did not use it as a residence, but his successor Brian Cowen used it occasionally, as did later Taoisigh Enda Kenny and Leo Varadkar, who each paid €50 per night for the use of the house to avoid benefit-in-kind tax being levied on them for use of the house as a grace and favour mansion.

=== Salute ===
"Mór Chluana" ("More of Cloyne") is a traditional air collected by Patrick Weston Joyce in 1873. "Amhrán Dóchais" ("Song of Hope") is a poem written by Osborn Bergin in 1913. John A. Costello chose the air as his musical salute. The salute is played by army bands on the arrival of the taoiseach at state ceremonies. Though the salute is often called "Amhrán Dóchais", Brian Ó Cuív argued "Mór Chluana" is the correct title.

== History ==
=== Origins and etymology ===
The words taoiseach and tánaiste (deputy prime minister) are both from the Irish language and of ancient origin. The taoiseach is described in the Constitution of Ireland as "the head of the Government or Prime Minister", its literal translation is 'chieftain' or 'leader'. Although Éamon de Valera, who introduced the title in 1937, was a democratic politician who had in the past associated with paramilitaries, some have remarked that the meaning 'leader' in 1937 made the title similar to the titles of fascist dictators of the time, such as Führer (for Adolf Hitler), Duce (for Benito Mussolini) and Caudillo (for Francisco Franco). Tánaiste, in turn, refers to the system of tanistry, the Gaelic system of succession whereby a leader would appoint an heir apparent while still living.

In Scottish Gaelic, tòiseach translates as 'clan chief' and both words originally had similar meanings in the Gaelic languages of Scotland and Ireland. The related Welsh language word tywysog (current meaning: 'prince') has a similar origin and meaning. It is hypothesised that both derive ultimately from the proto-Celtic *towissākos 'chieftain, leader'.

The plural of taoiseach is taoisigh (Northern and Western Irish: [ˈt̪ˠiːʃiː], Southern: [ˈt̪ˠiːʃɪɟ]).

Although the Irish form An Taoiseach is sometimes used in English instead of 'the Taoiseach', the English version of the Constitution states that they "shall be called … the Taoiseach".

=== Debate on the title ===
In 1937 when the draft Constitution of Ireland was being debated in the Dáil, Frank MacDermot, an opposition politician, moved an amendment to substitute "Prime Minister" for the proposed "Taoiseach" title in the English text of the Constitution. It was proposed to keep the "Taoiseach" title in the Irish language text. The proponent remarked:

It seems to me to be mere make-believe to try to incorporate a word like "Taoiseach" in the English language. It would be pronounced wrongly by 99 percent of the people. I have already ascertained it is a very difficult word to pronounce correctly. That being so, even for the sake of the dignity of the Irish language, it would be more sensible that when speaking English we should be allowed to refer to the gentleman in question as the Prime Minister... It is just one more example of the sort of things that are being done here as if for the purpose of putting off the people in the North. No useful purpose of any kind can be served by compelling us, when speaking English, to refer to An Taoiseach rather than to the Prime Minister.

The President of the Executive Council, Éamon de Valera, gave the term's meaning as "chieftain" or "Captain". He said he was "not disposed" to support the proposed amendment and felt the word "Taoiseach" did not need to be changed. The proposed amendment was defeated on a vote and "Taoiseach" was included as the title ultimately adopted by plebiscite of the people.

=== Modern office ===
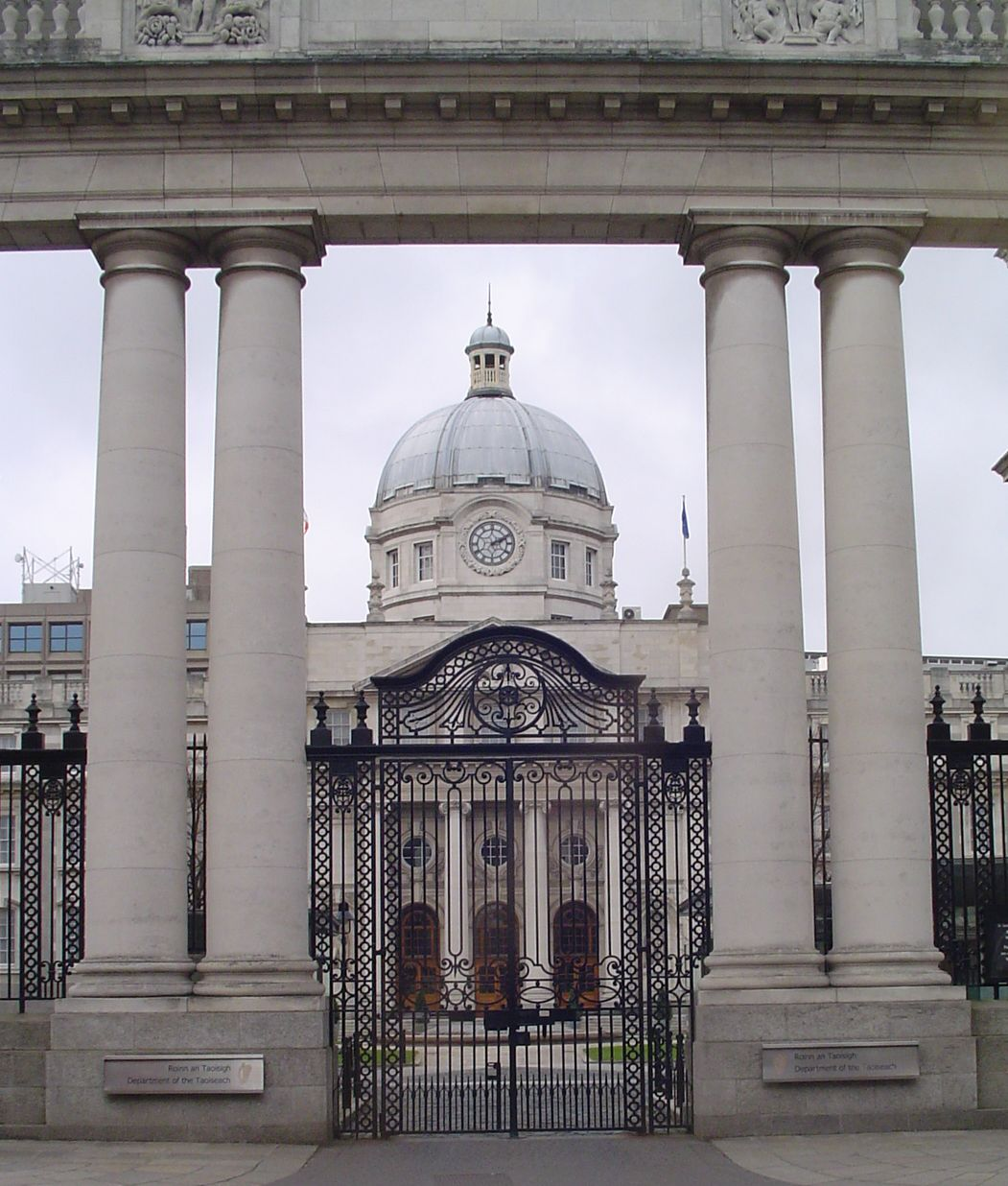
Department of the Taoiseach at Government Buildings, Merrion Street, Dublin

The modern position of taoiseach was established by the 1937 Constitution of Ireland and is the most powerful role in Irish politics. The office replaced the position of President of the Executive Council of the 1922–1937 Irish Free State.

The positions of taoiseach and president of the Executive Council differed in certain fundamental respects. Under the Constitution of the Irish Free State, the latter was vested with considerably less power and was largely just the chairman of the cabinet, the Executive Council. For example, the President of the Executive Council could not dismiss a fellow minister on his own authority. Instead, the Executive Council had to be disbanded and reformed entirely to remove a member. The President of the Executive Council also did not have the right to advise the Governor-General to dissolve Dáil Éireann on his own authority, that power belonging collectively to the Executive Council.

In contrast, the office of taoiseach as created in 1937 possesses a much more powerful role. The holder of the position can both advise the President to dismiss ministers and dissolve Parliament on his own authority—advice that the President is almost always required to follow by convention. (Note: Notable ministerial dismissals include those of Charles Haughey and Neil Blaney during the Arms Crisis in 1970, Brian Lenihan in 1990, Albert Reynolds, Pádraig Flynn and Máire Geoghegan-Quinn in 1991, and Barry Cowen in 2020.)

The taoiseach's role is significantly enhanced on paper compared to its counterparts in other parliamentary systems because it is vested with both de jure and de facto executive authority. In other parliamentary systems, the head of state is at least nominal chief executive, but is either bound by convention to act on the advice of the cabinet, or must have their acts countersigned by a minister. In Ireland, the Constitution explicitly vests executive authority in the Government, of which the taoiseach is the leader. The office was significantly enhanced when, after 1980, the Department of the Taoiseach was expanded to become a powerhouse for government policy making, rather than a facilitator of decisions.

Generally, where there have been multi-party or coalition governments, the Taoiseach has been the leader of the largest party in the coalition. One exception to this was John A. Costello, who was not the leader of his party, but an agreed choice to head the government, because the other parties refused to accept then Fine Gael leader Richard Mulcahy as Taoiseach. In 2011 Taoiseach Brian Cowen, resigned as party leader and was succeeded by Micheál Martin, but continued as Taoiseach until the formation of a new government following a general election.

Following the 2020 election, Fianna Fáil and Fine Gael entered coalition together for the first time. The two agreed to rotate the role of taoiseach, with Micheál Martin going first before becoming Tánaiste under Leo Varadkar, and later Simon Harris, of the smaller Fine Gael party. The two parties opted to continue this rotation after the 2024 election.

== List of office holders ==
Before the enactment of the 1937 Constitution, the head of government was the president of the Executive Council. This office was held by W. T. Cosgrave of Cumann na nGaedheal from 1922 to 1932, and by Éamon de Valera of Fianna Fáil from 1932 to 1937. By convention, taoisigh are numbered to include Cosgrave; therefore, Micheál Martin is considered the 15th taoiseach, not the 14th.

=== President of the Executive Council ===
No.	Portrait	Name (Birth–Death) Constituency	Term of office		Party	Exec. Council Composition		Vice President	Dáil (elected)
1		W. T. Cosgrave (1880–1965); TD for Carlow–Kilkenny until 1927; TD for Cork Borough from 1927	6 December 1922 (Note: Cosgrave was Chairman of the Provisional Government of the Irish Free State from 22 August 1922, during the transitional period before the state became officially independent on 6 December 1922 (See List of Irish heads of government).)	9 March 1932	Sinn Féin (Pro-Treaty)	1st	SF (PT) (minority)	Kevin O'Higgins	3 (1922)
1		W. T. Cosgrave (1880–1965); TD for Carlow–Kilkenny until 1927; TD for Cork Borough from 1927	6 December 1922	9 March 1932	Cumann na nGaedheal	2nd	CnG (minority)	Kevin O'Higgins	4 (1923)
1		W. T. Cosgrave (1880–1965); TD for Carlow–Kilkenny until 1927; TD for Cork Borough from 1927	6 December 1922	9 March 1932	Cumann na nGaedheal	3rd	CnG (minority)	Ernest Blythe	5 (Jun.1927)
1		W. T. Cosgrave (1880–1965); TD for Carlow–Kilkenny until 1927; TD for Cork Borough from 1927	6 December 1922	9 March 1932	Cumann na nGaedheal	4th	CnG (minority)	Ernest Blythe	6 (Sep.1927)
1		W. T. Cosgrave (1880–1965); TD for Carlow–Kilkenny until 1927; TD for Cork Borough from 1927	6 December 1922	9 March 1932	Cumann na nGaedheal	5th	CnG (minority)	Ernest Blythe	6 (Sep.1927)
2		Éamon de Valera (1882–1975); TD for Clare	9 March 1932 (Note: De Valera was President of Dáil Éireann in the pre-independence revolutionary Irish Government from 1 April 1919 to 9 January 1922 (See List of Irish heads of government).)	29 December 1937	Fianna Fáil	6th	FF (minority)	Seán T. O'Kelly	7 (1932)
2		Éamon de Valera (1882–1975); TD for Clare	9 March 1932	29 December 1937	Fianna Fáil	7th	FF (minority)	Seán T. O'Kelly	8 (1933)
2		Éamon de Valera (1882–1975); TD for Clare	9 March 1932	29 December 1937	Fianna Fáil	8th	FF (minority)	Seán T. O'Kelly	9 (1937)
=== Taoiseach ===
No.	Portrait	Name (Birth–Death) Constituency	Term of office		Party	Government Composition		Tánaiste	Dáil (elected)
(2)		Éamon de Valera (1882–1975); TD for Clare	29 December 1937	18 February 1948	Fianna Fáil	1st	FF (minority)	Seán T. O'Kelly	9 ( ···· )
(2)		Éamon de Valera (1882–1975); TD for Clare	29 December 1937	18 February 1948	Fianna Fáil	2nd	FF	Seán T. O'Kelly	10 (1938)
(2)		Éamon de Valera (1882–1975); TD for Clare	29 December 1937	18 February 1948	Fianna Fáil	3rd	FF (minority)	Seán T. O'Kelly	11 (1943)
(2)		Éamon de Valera (1882–1975); TD for Clare	29 December 1937	18 February 1948	Fianna Fáil	4th	FF	Seán Lemass	12 (1944)
3		John A. Costello (1891–1976); TD for Dublin South-East	18 February 1948	13 June 1951	Fine Gael	5th	FG–Lab–CnP–CnT–NL–Ind	William Norton	13 (1948)
(2)		Éamon de Valera (1882–1975); TD for Clare	13 June 1951	2 June 1954	Fianna Fáil	6th	FF (minority)	Seán Lemass	14 (1951)
(3)		John A. Costello (1891–1976); TD for Dublin South-East	2 June 1954	20 March 1957	Fine Gael	7th	FG–Lab–CnT	William Norton	15 (1954)
(2)		Éamon de Valera (1882–1975); TD for Clare	20 March 1957	23 June 1959	Fianna Fáil	8th	FF	Seán Lemass	16 (1957)
4		Seán Lemass (1899–1971); TD for Dublin South-Central	23 June 1959	10 November 1966	Fianna Fáil	9th	FF	Seán MacEntee	16 (1957)
4		Seán Lemass (1899–1971); TD for Dublin South-Central	23 June 1959	10 November 1966	Fianna Fáil	10th	FF (minority)	Seán MacEntee	17 (1961)
4		Seán Lemass (1899–1971); TD for Dublin South-Central	23 June 1959	10 November 1966	Fianna Fáil	11th	FF	Frank Aiken	18 (1965)
5		Jack Lynch (1917–1999); TD for Cork Borough until 1969; TD for Cork City North-West from 1969	10 November 1966	14 March 1973	Fianna Fáil	12th	FF	Frank Aiken	18 (1965)
5		Jack Lynch (1917–1999); TD for Cork Borough until 1969; TD for Cork City North-West from 1969	10 November 1966	14 March 1973	Fianna Fáil	13th	FF	Erskine H. Childers	19 (1969)
6		Liam Cosgrave (1920–2017); TD for Dún Laoghaire and Rathdown	14 March 1973	5 July 1977	Fine Gael	14th	FG–Lab	Brendan Corish	20 (1973)
(5)		Jack Lynch (1917–1999); TD for Cork City	5 July 1977	11 December 1979	Fianna Fáil	15th	FF	George Colley	21 (1977)
7		Charles Haughey (1925–2006); TD for Dublin Artane	11 December 1979	30 June 1981	Fianna Fáil	16th	FF	George Colley	21 (1977)
8		Garret FitzGerald (1926–2011); TD for Dublin South-East	30 June 1981	9 March 1982	Fine Gael	17th	FG–Lab (minority)	Michael O'Leary	22 (1981)
(7)		Charles Haughey (1925–2006); TD for Dublin North-Central	9 March 1982	14 December 1982	Fianna Fáil	18th	FF (minority)	Ray MacSharry	23 (Feb.1982)
(8)		Garret FitzGerald (1926–2011); TD for Dublin South-East	14 December 1982	10 March 1987	Fine Gael	19th	FG–Lab; FG (minority) from Jan 1987	Dick Spring	24 (Nov.1982)
(8)		Garret FitzGerald (1926–2011); TD for Dublin South-East	14 December 1982	10 March 1987	Fine Gael	19th	FG–Lab; FG (minority) from Jan 1987	Peter Barry	24 (Nov.1982)
(7)		Charles Haughey (1925–2006); TD for Dublin North-Central	10 March 1987	11 February 1992	Fianna Fáil	20th	FF (minority)	Brian Lenihan	25 (1987)
(7)		Charles Haughey (1925–2006); TD for Dublin North-Central	10 March 1987	11 February 1992	Fianna Fáil	21st	FF–PD	Brian Lenihan	26 (1989)
(7)		Charles Haughey (1925–2006); TD for Dublin North-Central	10 March 1987	11 February 1992	Fianna Fáil	21st	FF–PD	John Wilson	26 (1989)
9		Albert Reynolds (1932–2014); TD for Longford–Roscommon	11 February 1992	15 December 1994	Fianna Fáil	22nd	FF–PD; FF (minority) from Nov 1992	John Wilson	26 (1989)
9		Albert Reynolds (1932–2014); TD for Longford–Roscommon	11 February 1992	15 December 1994	Fianna Fáil	23rd	FF–Lab; FF (minority) from Nov 1994	Dick Spring	27 (1992)
9		Albert Reynolds (1932–2014); TD for Longford–Roscommon	11 February 1992	15 December 1994	Fianna Fáil	23rd	FF–Lab; FF (minority) from Nov 1994	Bertie Ahern	27 (1992)
10		John Bruton (1947–2024); TD for Meath	15 December 1994	26 June 1997	Fine Gael	24th	FG–Lab–DL	Dick Spring	27 (1992)
11		Bertie Ahern (b. 1951); TD for Dublin Central	26 June 1997	7 May 2008	Fianna Fáil	25th	FF–PD (minority)	Mary Harney	28 (1997)
11		Bertie Ahern (b. 1951); TD for Dublin Central	26 June 1997	7 May 2008	Fianna Fáil	26th	FF–PD	Mary Harney	29 (2002)
11		Bertie Ahern (b. 1951); TD for Dublin Central	26 June 1997	7 May 2008	Fianna Fáil	26th	FF–PD	Michael McDowell	29 (2002)
11		Bertie Ahern (b. 1951); TD for Dublin Central	26 June 1997	7 May 2008	Fianna Fáil	27th	FF–Green–PD	Brian Cowen	30 (2007)
12		Brian Cowen (b. 1960); TD for Laois–Offaly	7 May 2008	9 March 2011	Fianna Fáil	28th	FF–Green–PD; FF–Green–Ind from Nov 2009; FF (minority) from Jan 2011	Mary Coughlan	30 (2007)
13		Enda Kenny (b. 1951); TD for Mayo	9 March 2011	14 June 2017	Fine Gael	29th	FG–Lab	Eamon Gilmore	31 (2011)
13		Enda Kenny (b. 1951); TD for Mayo	9 March 2011	14 June 2017	Fine Gael	29th	FG–Lab	Joan Burton	31 (2011)
13		Enda Kenny (b. 1951); TD for Mayo	9 March 2011	14 June 2017	Fine Gael	30th	FG–Ind (minority)	Frances Fitzgerald	32 (2016)
14		Leo Varadkar (b. 1979); TD for Dublin West	14 June 2017	27 June 2020	Fine Gael	31st	FG–Ind (minority)	Frances Fitzgerald	32 (2016)
14		Leo Varadkar (b. 1979); TD for Dublin West	14 June 2017	27 June 2020	Fine Gael	31st	FG–Ind (minority)	Simon Coveney	32 (2016)
15		Micheál Martin (b. 1960); TD for Cork South-Central	27 June 2020	17 December 2022	Fianna Fáil	32nd	FF–FG–Green	Leo Varadkar	33 (2020)
(14)		Leo Varadkar (b. 1979); TD for Dublin West	17 December 2022	9 April 2024	Fine Gael	33rd	FG–FF–Green	Micheál Martin	33 (2020)
16		Simon Harris (b. 1986); TD for Wicklow	9 April 2024	23 January 2025	Fine Gael	34th	FG–FF–Green	Micheál Martin	33 (2020)
(15)		Micheál Martin (b. 1960); TD for Cork South-Central	23 January 2025	Incumbent	Fianna Fáil	35th	FF–FG–Ind	Simon Harris	34 (2024)

== See also ==
- Politics of the Republic of Ireland
- Records of Irish heads of government since 1922
- List of Irish heads of government
