= List of ministerial resignations and terminations of appointment in the Republic of Ireland =

The lists below indicate members of the government of Ireland (government ministers) or ministers of state (junior ministers) who left office during the term of a government.

In many instances, a resignation was requested by the Taoiseach, including during a reshuffle. This is distinct from circumstances where a minister's appointment was terminated by the Taoiseach, including instances where the minister refused to comply with a request to resign. Ministers may become disqualified if they cease to be members of the Oireachtas (other than at a general election) or if there is a statutory disqualification preventing them from remaining in office.

Prior to 1937, the head of government was the President of the Executive Council of the Irish Free State, rather than the Taoiseach.

== Government ministers ==
Members of the government are appointed by the president on the nomination of the Taoiseach with the approval of the Dáil. The president accepts the resignation or terminates the appointment of a minister based on the advice of the Taoiseach. This is governed by Articles 13 and 28 of the Constitution of Ireland.

=== Resignations ===
Government	Date	Minister	Position	Party	Taoiseach	Notes
2nd EC	7 March 1924	Joseph McGrath	Minister for Industry and Commerce	Cumann na nGaedheal	W. T. Cosgrave	Irish Army Mutiny: opposition to approach of Executive Council
2nd EC	19 March 1924	Richard Mulcahy	Minister for Defence	Cumann na nGaedheal	W. T. Cosgrave	Irish Army Mutiny
2nd EC	24 November 1925	Eoin MacNeill	Minister for Education	Cumann na nGaedheal	W. T. Cosgrave	Failure of Irish Boundary Commission to secure substantial territory
5th Gov	11 April 1951	Noël Browne	Minister for Health	Clann na Poblachta	John A. Costello	Disagreement over Mother and Child Scheme
10th Gov	8 October 1964	Paddy Smith	Minister for Agriculture	Fianna Fáil	Seán Lemass	Disagreement over farming policy
13th Gov	4 May 1970	Mícheál Ó Móráin	Minister for Justice	Fianna Fáil	Jack Lynch	Requested due to medical absence
13th Gov	7 May 1970	Kevin Boland	Minister for Local Government; Minister for Social Welfare	Fianna Fáil	Jack Lynch	In protest at the sacking of Blaney and Haughey
13th Gov	3 January 1973	Patrick Hillery	Minister for Foreign Affairs	Fianna Fáil	Jack Lynch	Nominated as European Commissioner
14th Gov	2 December 1976	Richard Burke	Minister for Education	Fine Gael	Liam Cosgrave	Nominated as European Commissioner
16th Gov	15 October 1980	Pádraig Faulkner	Minister for Defence	Fianna Fáil	Charles Haughey	Nominated as Ceann Comhairle
16th Gov	16 December 1980	Michael O'Kennedy	Minister for Finance	Fianna Fáil	Charles Haughey	Nominated as European Commissioner
18th Gov	6 October 1982	Martin O'Donoghue	Minister for Education	Fianna Fáil	Charles Haughey	Supported challenge to leadership
18th Gov	6 October 1982	Desmond O'Malley	Minister for Trade, Commerce and Tourism	Fianna Fáil	Charles Haughey	Supported challenge to leadership
19th Gov	8 December 1983	Frank Cluskey	Minister for Trade, Commerce and Tourism	Labour	Garret FitzGerald	Disagreement on Dublin Gas Policy
19th Gov	20 January 1987	Dick Spring	Minister for Energy and Tánaiste	Labour	Garret FitzGerald	Left government in opposition to budget
19th Gov	20 January 1987	Barry Desmond	Minister for Health	Labour	Garret FitzGerald	Left government in opposition to budget
19th Gov	20 January 1987	Liam Kavanagh	Minister for Tourism, Fisheries and Forestry	Labour	Garret FitzGerald	Left government in opposition to budget
19th Gov	20 January 1987	Ruairi Quinn	Minister for Labour; Minister for the Public Service	Labour	Garret FitzGerald	Left government in opposition to budget
20th Gov	24 November 1988	Ray MacSharry	Minister for Finance	Fianna Fáil	Charles Haughey	Nominated as European Commissioner
22nd Gov	4 November 1992	Desmond O'Malley	Minister for Industry and Commerce	Progressive Democrats	Albert Reynolds	Party left government (Beef Tribunal)
22nd Gov	4 November 1992	Bobby Molloy	Minister for Energy	Progressive Democrats	Albert Reynolds	Party left government (Beef Tribunal)
22nd Gov	4 January 1993	Pádraig Flynn	Minister for Justice	Fianna Fáil	Albert Reynolds	Nominated as European Commissioner
23rd Gov	17 November 1994	Dick Spring	Minister for Foreign Affairs and Tánaiste	Labour	Albert Reynolds	Party left government
23rd Gov	17 November 1994	Ruairi Quinn	Minister for Enterprise and Employment	Labour	Albert Reynolds	Party left government
23rd Gov	17 November 1994	Mervyn Taylor	Minister for Equality and Law Reform	Labour	Albert Reynolds	Party left government
23rd Gov	17 November 1994	Michael D. Higgins	Minister for Arts, Culture and the Gaeltacht	Labour	Albert Reynolds	Party left government
23rd Gov	17 November 1994	Brendan Howlin	Minister for Health	Labour	Albert Reynolds	Party left government
23rd Gov	17 November 1994	Niamh Bhreathnach	Minister for Education	Labour	Albert Reynolds	Party left government
24th Gov	23 May 1995	Hugh Coveney	Minister for Defence; Minister for the Marine	Fine Gael	John Bruton	Demoted to Minister of State
24th Gov	3 December 1996	Michael Lowry	Minister for Transport, Energy and Communications	Fine Gael	John Bruton	Reports of receipt of improper payments
25th Gov	8 October 1997	Ray Burke	Minister for Foreign Affairs	Fianna Fáil	Bertie Ahern	Reports of corrupt payments
25th Gov	27 January 2000	David Andrews	Minister for Foreign Affairs	Fianna Fáil	Bertie Ahern	Retirement after implementation of Good Friday Agreement
26th Gov	29 September 2004	Charlie McCreevy	Minister for Finance	Fianna Fáil	Bertie Ahern	Nominated as European Commissioner
26th Gov	29 September 2004	Michael Smith	Minister for Defence	Fianna Fáil	Bertie Ahern	To facilitate cabinet reshuffle
26th Gov	29 September 2004	Joe Walsh	Minister for Agriculture and Food	Fianna Fáil	Bertie Ahern	Retirement
28th Gov	18 February 2010	Willie O'Dea	Minister for Defence	Fianna Fáil	Brian Cowen	Affidavit controversy
28th Gov	23 March 2010	Martin Cullen	Minister for Arts, Sport and Tourism	Fianna Fáil	Brian Cowen	Ill health
28th Gov	19 January 2011	Micheál Martin	Minister for Foreign Affairs	Fianna Fáil	Brian Cowen	Challenge to leadership
28th Gov	20 January 2011	Mary Harney	Minister for Health	Independent	Brian Cowen	Ahead of retirement at forthcoming general election
28th Gov	20 January 2011	Dermot Ahern	Minister for Justice and Law Reform	Fianna Fáil	Brian Cowen	Ahead of retirement at forthcoming general election
28th Gov	20 January 2011	Noel Dempsey	Minister for Transport	Fianna Fáil	Brian Cowen	Ahead of retirement at forthcoming general election
28th Gov	20 January 2011	Batt O'Keeffe	Minister for Enterprise, Trade and Innovation	Fianna Fáil	Brian Cowen	Ahead of retirement at forthcoming general election
28th Gov	20 January 2011	Tony Killeen	Minister for Defence	Fianna Fáil	Brian Cowen	Ahead of retirement at forthcoming general election
28th Gov	23 January 2011	John Gormley	Minister for the Environment, Heritage and Local Government	Green	Brian Cowen	Party left government
28th Gov	23 January 2011	Eamon Ryan	Minister for Communications, Energy and Natural Resources	Green	Brian Cowen	Party left government
29th Gov	7 May 2014	Alan Shatter	Minister for Justice and Equality; Minister for Defence	Fine Gael	Enda Kenny	Publication of Guerin Report
29th Gov	11 July 2014	Eamonn Gilmore	Minister for Foreign Affairs and Trade and Tánaiste	Labour	Enda Kenny	Following Labour leadership election
29th Gov	11 July 2014	Ruairi Quinn	Minister for Education and Skills	Labour	Enda Kenny	Following Labour leadership election
29th Gov	11 July 2014	Pat Rabbitte	Minister for Communications, Energy and Natural Resources	Labour	Enda Kenny	Following Labour leadership election
29th Gov	11 July 2014	Phil Hogan	Minister for the Environment, Community and Local Government	Fine Gael	Enda Kenny	Nominated as European Commissioner
29th Gov	11 July 2014	Jimmy Deenihan	Minister for Arts, Heritage and the Gaeltacht	Fine Gael	Enda Kenny	Demoted to Minister of State
31st Gov	28 November 2017	Frances Fitzgerald	Minister for Business, Enterprise and Innovation and Tánaiste	Fine Gael	Leo Varadkar	Threat of motion of no confidence surrounding Garda whistleblower scandal
31st Gov	11 October 2018	Denis Naughten	Minister for Communications, Climate Action and Environment	Independent	Leo Varadkar	Broadband procurement process
32nd Gov	21 August 2020	Dara Calleary	Minister for Agriculture, Food and the Marine	Fianna Fáil	Micheál Martin	Golfgate

=== Terminations of appointment ===
Government	Date	Minister	Position	Party	Taoiseach	Notes
13th Gov	7 May 1970	Neil Blaney	Minister for Agriculture	Fianna Fáil	Jack Lynch	Arms Crisis
13th Gov	7 May 1970	Charles Haughey	Minister for Finance	Fianna Fáil	Jack Lynch	Arms Crisis
21st Gov	31 October 1990	Brian Lenihan	Minister for Defence and Tánaiste	Fianna Fáil	Charles Haughey	
21st Gov	7 November 1991	Albert Reynolds	Minister for Finance	Fianna Fáil	Charles Haughey	Challenge to leader
21st Gov	7 November 1991	Pádraig Flynn	Minister for the Environment	Fianna Fáil	Charles Haughey	Challenge to leader
32nd Gov	14 July 2020	Barry Cowen	Minister for Agriculture, Food and the Marine	Fianna Fáil	Micheál Martin	Non-disclosure of driving offences

=== Disqualification ===
Government	Date	Minister	Position	Party	Taoiseach	Notes
7th EC	29 May 1936	Joseph Connolly	Minister for Lands	Fianna Fáil	Éamon de Valera	Abolition of Seanad Éireann
4th Gov	18 June 1945	Seán T. O'Kelly	Minister for Finance; Tánaiste	Fianna Fáil	Éamon de Valera	Election as president of Ireland

=== Nomination withdrawn ===
On 13 November 1991, Jim McDaid was proposed as Minister for Defence, but his name was withdrawn later that day.

== Ministers of State ==
Ministers of State are appointed by the government on the nomination of the Taoiseach. Prior to 1978, the equivalent position was Parliamentary Secretary.

=== Resignations ===
Government	Date	Minister	Department	Party	Taoiseach	Notes
2nd EC	31 March 1924	Daniel McCarthy	President of the Executive Council (Chief Whip)	Cumann na nGaedheal	W. T. Cosgrave	Irish Army Mutiny: opposition to approach of Executive Council
4th Gov	13 July 1946	Conn Ward	Local Government and Public Health	Fianna Fáil	Éamon de Valera	Findings of Tribunal
13th Gov	8 May 1970	Paudge Brennan	Local Government	Fianna Fáil	Jack Lynch	Arms Crisis
15th Gov	1 July 1979	Patrick Lalor	Taoiseach (Chief Whip); Defence	Fianna Fáil	Jack Lynch	Elected as MEP
19th Gov	13 February 1986	Joseph Bermingham	Finance	Labour	Garret FitzGerald	Reshuffle
19th Gov	20 January 1987	Michael Moynihan	Tourism, Fisheries and Forestry	Labour	Garret FitzGerald	Party left government in opposition to the budget
19th Gov	20 January 1987	Séamus Pattison	Social Welfare	Labour	Garret FitzGerald	Party left government in opposition to the budget
19th Gov	20 January 1987	Toddy O'Sullivan	Environment	Labour	Garret FitzGerald	Party left government in opposition to the budget
22nd Gov	4 November 1992	Mary Harney	Environment	Progressive Democrats	Albert Reynolds	Party left government (Beef Tribunal)
24th Gov	9 February 1995	Phil Hogan	Finance	Fine Gael	John Bruton	Leaked details of budget
25th Gov	27 January 2000	Chris Flood	Tourism, Sport and Recreation	Fianna Fáil	Bertie Ahern	Ill health
25th Gov	17 February 2001	Ned O'Keeffe	Agriculture, Food and Rural Development	Fianna Fáil	Bertie Ahern	Failed to disclose a conflict of interest
25th Gov	10 April 2002	Bobby Molloy	Government; Environment and Local Government	Progressive Democrats	Bertie Ahern	Backlash after an attempted intervention in a rape case
26th Gov	4 October 2004	Jim McDaid	Transport	Fianna Fáil	Bertie Ahern	Not disclosed, rumored to have been to alcoholism
26th Gov	8 December 2005	Ivor Callely	Transport	Fianna Fáil	Bertie Ahern	Failed to disclose a conflict of interest
26th Gov	8 December 2006	Síle de Valera	Education and Science	Fianna Fáil	Bertie Ahern	Ahead of retirement at forthcoming general election
28th Gov	22 April 2009	Noel Ahern	Transport	Fianna Fáil	Brian Cowen	Resigned, not re-appointed in reshuffle (Note: Cowen requested the resignation of all 20 Ministers of State. The remaining 13 were re-appointed on the same day, with two new appointments to junior ministerial office.)
28th Gov	22 April 2009	Jimmy Devins	Education and Science; Enterprise, Trade and Employment	Fianna Fáil	Brian Cowen	Resigned, not re-appointed in reshuffle
28th Gov	22 April 2009	Máire Hoctor	Health and Children; Social and Family Affairs; Environment, Heritage and Local Government	Fianna Fáil	Brian Cowen	Resigned, not re-appointed in reshuffle
28th Gov	22 April 2009	Michael P. Kitt	Environment, Heritage and Local Government	Fianna Fáil	Brian Cowen	Resigned, not re-appointed in reshuffle
28th Gov	22 April 2009	John McGuinness	Enterprise, Trade and Employment	Fianna Fáil	Brian Cowen	Resigned, not re-appointed in reshuffle
28th Gov	22 April 2009	Seán Power	Communications, Energy and Natural Resources	Fianna Fáil	Brian Cowen	Resigned, not re-appointed in reshuffle
28th Gov	22 April 2009	Mary Wallace	Health and Children	Fianna Fáil	Brian Cowen	Resigned, not re-appointed in reshuffle
28th Gov	23 February 2010	Trevor Sargent	Agriculture, Fisheries and Food; Health and Children	Green	Brian Cowen	Attempted to exert influence over Garda in a local case
28th Gov	23 January 2011	Ciarán Cuffe	Agriculture, Fisheries and Food; Transport; Environment, Heritage and Local Government	Green	Brian Cowen	Party left government
28th Gov	23 January 2011	Mary White	Justice and Law Reform; Community, Equality and Gaeltacht Affairs; Education and Skills	Green	Brian Cowen	Party left government
29th Gov	15 November 2011	Willie Penrose	Environment, Community and Local Government	Labour	Enda Kenny	Opposition to closure of Columb Barracks
29th Gov	26 September 2012	Róisín Shortall	Health	Labour	Enda Kenny	Disagreement over healthcare reforms
29th Gov	11 July 2013	Lucinda Creighton	Taoiseach; Foreign Affairs (European Affairs)	Fine Gael	Enda Kenny	Lost party whip on voting against Protection of Life During Pregnancy Bill 2013
29th Gov	15 July 2014	Dinny McGinley	Arts, Heritage and the Gaeltacht	Fine Gael	Enda Kenny	Reshuffle
29th Gov	15 July 2014	John Perry	Jobs, Enterprise and Innovation	Fine Gael	Enda Kenny	Reshuffle
29th Gov	15 July 2014	Fergus O'Dowd	Environment, Community and Local Government; Communications, Energy and Natural Resources	Fine Gael	Enda Kenny	Reshuffle
29th Gov	15 July 2014	Ciarán Cannon	Education and Skills	Fine Gael	Enda Kenny	Reshuffle
29th Gov	15 July 2014	Joe Costello	Foreign Affairs and Trade	Labour	Enda Kenny	Reshuffle
30th Gov	3 June 2017	Seán Canney	Public Expenditure and Reform	Independent	Enda Kenny	Arrangement with Kevin "Boxer" Moran
32nd Gov	26 August 2022	Robert Troy	Enterprise, Trade and Employment	Fianna Fáil	Micheál Martin	Non-disclosure of property interests
33rd Gov	12 January 2023	Damien English	Enterprise, Trade and Employment; Social Protection	Fine Gael	Leo Varadkar	Planning application irregularity
33rd Gov	22 March 2024	Josepha Madigan	Education	Fine Gael	Leo Varadkar	Ahead of retirement at next election

=== Terminations of appointment ===
Government	Date	Minister	Department	Party	Taoiseach	Notes
19th Gov	18 February 1986	Donal Creed	Education	Fine Gael	Garret FitzGerald	Refused to resign in the reshuffle
19th Gov	18 February 1986	Michael D'Arcy	Fisheries and Forestry	Fine Gael	Garret FitzGerald	Refused to resign in the reshuffle
19th Gov	23 September 1986	Edward Collins	Energy; Industry and Commerce	Fine Gael	Garret FitzGerald	Failure to disclose conflict of interest
21st Gov	15 November 1991	Máire Geoghegan-Quinn	Taoiseach	Fianna Fáil	Charles Haughey	Supported challenge to leader
21st Gov	15 November 1991	Noel Treacy	Health	Fianna Fáil	Charles Haughey	Supported challenge to leader
21st Gov	15 November 1991	Michael Smith	Industry and Commerce	Fianna Fáil	Charles Haughey	Supported challenge to leader

=== Disqualification ===
Government	Date	Minister	Department	Party	Taoiseach	Notes
23rd Gov	9 June 1994	Liam Hyland	Agriculture, Food and Forestry	Fianna Fáil	Albert Reynolds	Election as MEP
26th Gov	11 June 2004	Liam Aylward	Agriculture and Food	Fianna Fáil	Bertie Ahern	Election as MEP
29th Gov	23 May 2014	Brian Hayes	Finance; Public Expenditure and Reform	Fine Gael	Enda Kenny	Election as MEP
