= List of female cabinet ministers of the Republic of Ireland =

List of women who served in the Government of Ireland

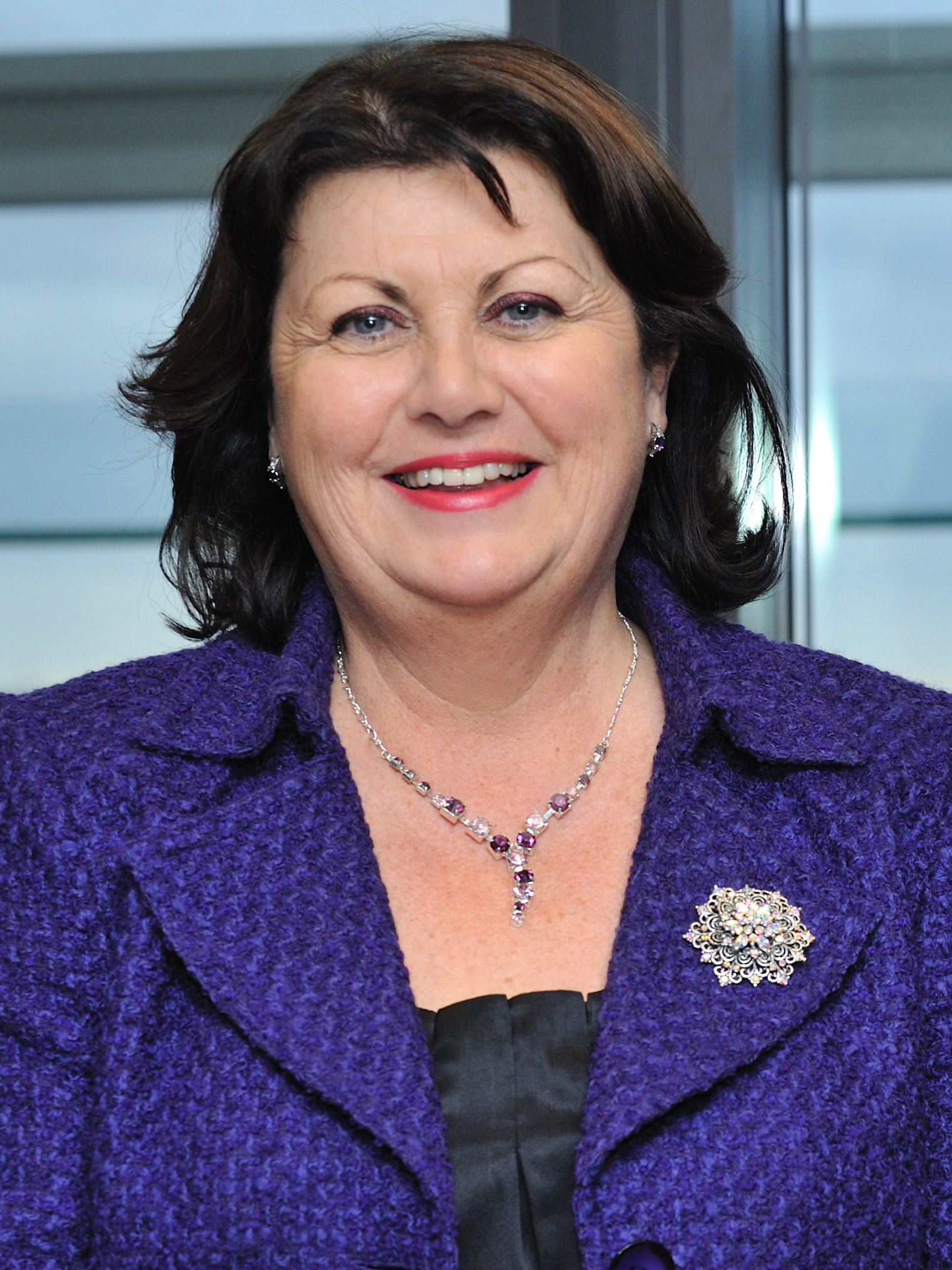
Máire Geoghegan-Quinn, who in 1979 became the first woman in an Irish cabinet since 1921

The Government of Ireland is the cabinet that exercises executive authority in the Republic of Ireland. Its ministers are collectively responsible for the Departments of State administered by the members of the Government.

As of 2025, twenty-three women have served as cabinet ministers in governments of the Republic of Ireland and its predecessors the Irish Free State (1922–1937) and the Irish Republic (1919–1922). After a 58-year gap between the first and second women ministers, there has been at least one woman in all cabinets since December 1982. No woman has ever been Taoiseach (prime minister), but four women have served as Tánaiste (deputy prime minister).

Other women have served outside the cabinet as junior ministers, known until 1978 as Parliamentary Secretaries, and since then as Ministers of State. (Note: Some Ministers of State, including the Government Chief Whip, attend cabinet meetings in a non-voting capacity but are not members of the Government. They are formally known as "Minister of State attending Government", or colloquially as "Super Junior" ministers.) For example, five of the twenty Ministers of State appointed by the government of Micheál Martin in June 2020 were women, with two regularly attending cabinet.

The 35th government of Ireland was formed in January 2025 by Taoiseach Micheál Martin. As of 2025 it includes four women as ministers in the cabinet: Norma Foley, Helen McEntee, Jennifer Carroll MacNeill, and Hildegarde Naughton. No more than four women have served in cabinet at any one time. Criticism of the imbalance is defended by pointing to male dominance of the Oireachtas (parliament) from which ministers are appointed.

== Constitution ==
The 1937 Constitution of Ireland requires the government to consist of between seven and fifteen members, including the Taoiseach (prime minister). The Taoiseach is elected by Dáil Éireann (the lower house of the Oireachtas), and chooses the other ministers including the Tánaiste (deputy prime minister).

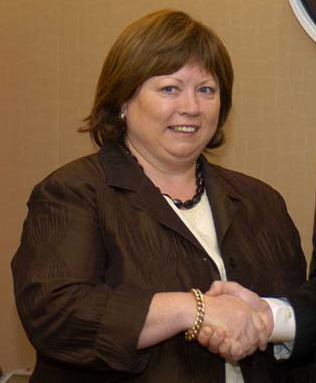
Mary Harney, the first woman Tánaiste, and first woman to serve as an independent cabinet minister.

Since the formation of the 12th government of Ireland in 1966, all Irish cabinets have been formed with the constitutional maximum of fifteen ministers. The total sometimes falls below this number for brief periods following the resignation of individual ministers or the withdrawal of a party from a coalition. For example, six ministers resigned in January 2011 from the 28th government of Ireland, and were not replaced until March, when the 29th Government was formed after the general election in February.

Only three ministerial offices are specifically identified in the constitution: Taoiseach, Tánaiste and Minister for Finance. No woman has ever been appointed as Taoiseach or Minister for Finance. However, four women have served as Tánaiste. The first woman Tánaiste was Mary Harney (1997–2006), who in 1993 had become the first woman to lead a political party in the Dáil. Harney was followed by Mary Coughlan (2008–2011), Joan Burton (2014–2016), and Frances Fitzgerald (2016–2017).

Each minister must be a member of the Oireachtas (the national parliament), whose eligibility criteria for membership are defined as being "without distinction of sex". Up to two members of the Government may be members of Seanad Éireann, the upper house of the Oireachtas, but the only three senators ever appointed as ministers were men. All women in Irish cabinets have been Teachtaí Dála (TDs), i.e. members of Dáil Éireann.

== History ==
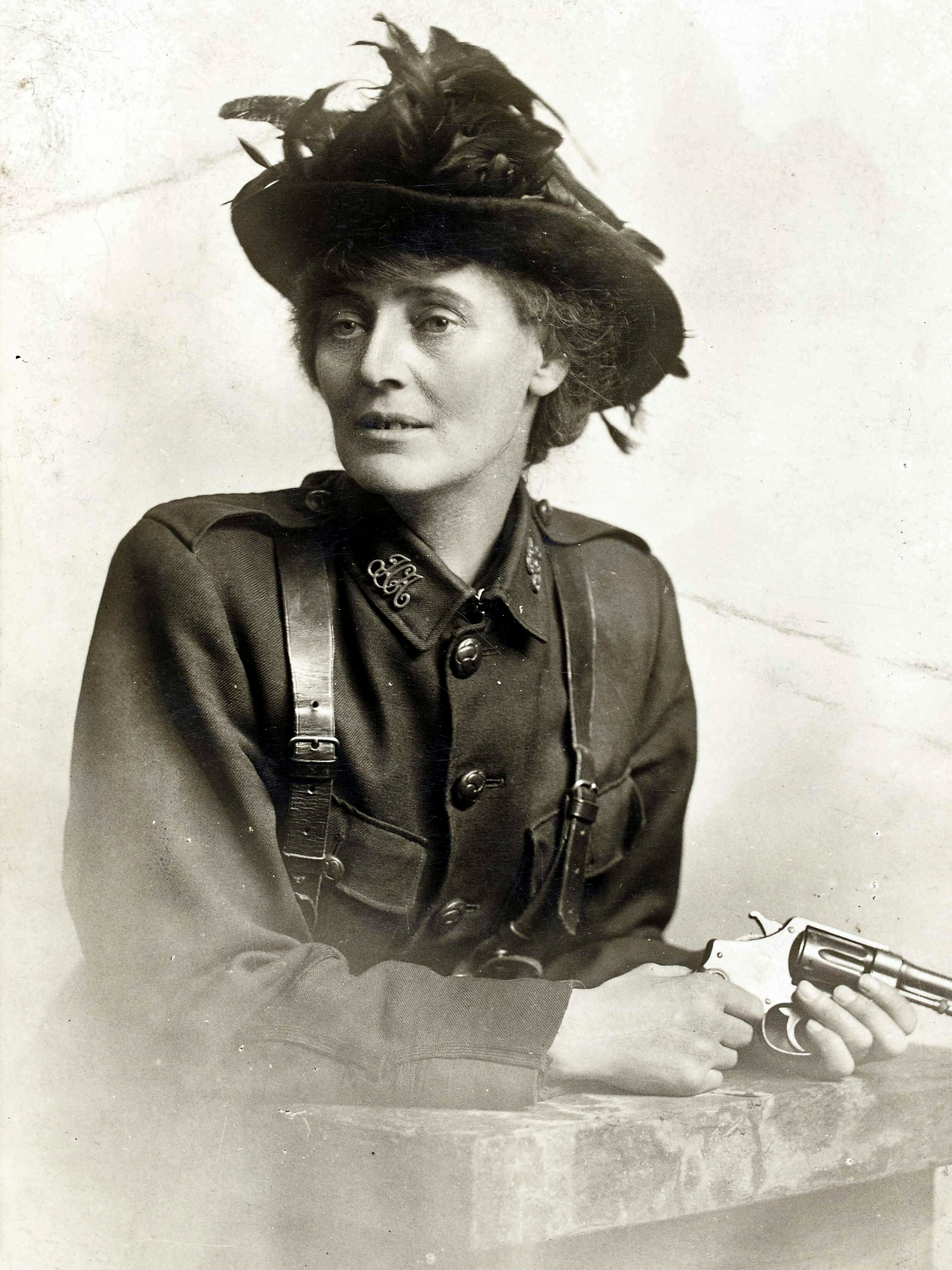
Constance Markievicz, the first woman cabinet minister in Ireland

The first woman cabinet minister in Ireland was Constance Markievicz, who in April 1919 became Minister for Labour in the Second Ministry of the revolutionary First Dáil. She was only the second woman minister in the national government of any country, after Alexandra Kollontai's appointment in 1917 as People's Commissar in the Russian Soviet Federative Socialist Republic.

When the Second Dáil assembled in August 1921, Markievicz continued as Minister for Labour, but her post was no longer at cabinet level in the Government of the 2nd Dáil. Markievicz and other ministers opposed to the Anglo-Irish Treaty resigned from the Government on 9 January 1922.

Only two women were returned to the 3rd Dáil in the general election in June 1922, down from six at the 1921 election, when 4.7% of TDs were women. The 1920s and 1930s were a conservative period in Ireland, in which women's rights were reversed, and no women were members of the Executive Council of the 1922–1937 Irish Free State. From the 1930s to the 1960s most women TDs were widows or other relatives of deceased TDs, and the 4.7% ratio achieved in 1921 was not equalled again until the 1981 general election returned 11 women, who comprised 6.6% of the 22nd Dáil.

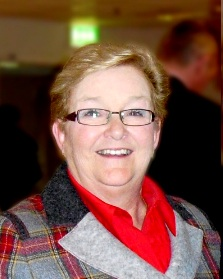
Niamh Bhreathnach, the first woman to be appointed as minister at the start of her first Dáil term

More than 58 years elapsed between Markievicz leaving office and the appointment in December 1979 of Máire Geoghegan-Quinn as the second woman in cabinet. In 1977, Geoghegan-Quinn had become the first woman since Markievicz to serve as a junior minister in the Irish government, when Jack Lynch appointed her as Parliamentary Secretary to the Minister for Industry and Commerce. Two years later, aged 29, she was "flabbergasted" to become Minister for the Gaeltacht in the first cabinet of Taoiseach Charles Haughey.

Since then, the only all-male Irish government was the March–December 1982 second government of Charles Haughey. All cabinets since December 1982 have included at least one woman. The first time two women served as ministers simultaneously was in January 1993, when Taoiseach Albert Reynolds included both Máire Geoghegan-Quinn and Niamh Bhreathnach in his cabinet. Bhreathnach was the first woman to be appointed as minister at the start of her first Dáil term, and the only one until Katherine Zappone became Minister for Children and Youth Affairs in May 2016.

Political scientists Yvonne Galligan and Fiona Buckley note that women have been grossly under-represented in Irish politics, with men making up 91% of all cabinet appointments between 1919 and June 2017. They also found that women in the Irish cabinet are twice as likely to hold a social portfolio (48%) than an economic portfolio (24%). By contrast, only 17% of men held social portfolios, and 52% held an economic or foreign affairs portfolio.

All but two of the women who have served as ministers since 1919 are still alive. The first Irish woman minister, Constance Markievicz, died in 1927, and the third, Eileen Desmond, died in 2005. Ireland's oldest living woman former minister is 89-year-old Mary O'Rourke.

=== Calls for gender balance ===
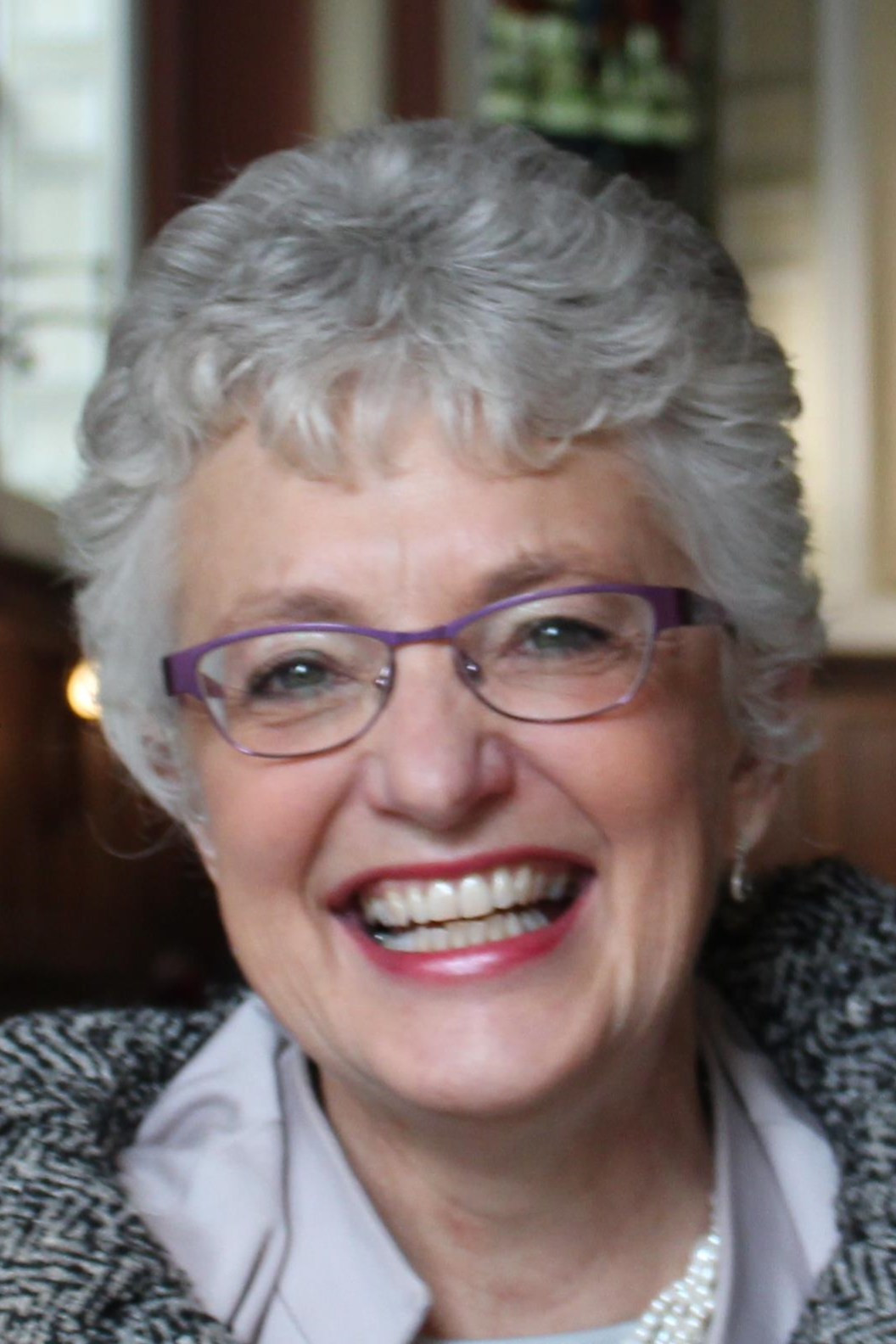
Katherine Zappone, the first woman to be appointed to an Irish cabinet as an independent politician

The highest number of women ever in an Irish cabinet is four, a number first reached in 2004–2007, and again in each cabinet from 2014 to the present. However, this amounts to only 27% of the 15 ministers, and has been criticised by the National Women's Council of Ireland as "way off a gender-balanced Cabinet".

In 2014, then Taoiseach Enda Kenny pledged that if re-elected he would appoint a cabinet "50:50 on merit, of men and women". When Kenny formed the 30th Government in May 2016 with four women ministers out of fifteen, he was criticised by women campaigners for the lack of increase. Minister Regina Doherty defended Kenny, saying he had "probably done the best that he can do". TheJournal.ie noted that the "proportion of senior ministers who are women is 27%, higher than the 22% of TDs". In June 2017, Kenny's successor Leo Varadkar also appointed four women to his cabinet. He too was criticised for not including more women, but replied that "your ministerial team generally reflects the composition of the Dáil". Varadkar promised "to make sure we have many more women in our next parliamentary party so that I can promote many more women".

In February 2018, Minister for Culture, Heritage and the Gaeltacht Josepha Madigan launched a programme of commemoration of the centenary of women's enfranchisement. The Representation of the People Act 1918 gave limited voting rights for women. The right to stand for election was granted later in 1918, by the Parliament (Qualification of Women) Act. Madigan said the Irish State "failed women for far too long," and that it was time to "redouble our efforts" to provide equal opportunities. Former Tánaiste Joan Burton called for the next government to consist of an equal number of men and women.

== List of women ministers ==
Numerical order represents the order of first appointment to the cabinet.
Age represents age on appointment to that office.

Denotes incumbent minister

#	Name	Portrait	Office	Party	Appointed	Left office	Age	Taoiseach	Govt
1	Constance Markievicz (1868–1927)	Constance Markievicz.	Minister for Labour	Sinn Féin	1 April 1919	26 August 1921	51	Éamon de Valera (Note: Éamon de Valera was President of Dáil Éireann or Príomh Aire in the Ministry of Dáil Éireann. The 1922–1937 Irish Free State, which had no women cabinet ministers and no women Parliamentary Secretaries (junior ministers), used the title President of the Executive Council. The title of Taoiseach for the head of government was introduced in the 1937 Constitution of Ireland. The first woman to serve as a cabinet minister under a Taoiseach was Máire Geoghegan-Quinn, who was appointed in 1979 to Charles Haughey's first cabinet.)	2nd DM
2	Máire Geoghegan-Quinn (born 1950)	Máire Geoghegan-Quinn.	Minister for the Gaeltacht	Fianna Fáil	11 December 1979	30 June 1981	29	Charles Haughey	16th
2	Máire Geoghegan-Quinn (born 1950)	Máire Geoghegan-Quinn.	Minister for Tourism, Transport and Communications	Fianna Fáil	11 February 1992	12 January 1993	42	Albert Reynolds	22nd
2	Máire Geoghegan-Quinn (born 1950)	Máire Geoghegan-Quinn.	Minister for Justice	Fianna Fáil	4 January 1993	15 December 1994	42	Albert Reynolds	23rd
2	Máire Geoghegan-Quinn (born 1950)	Máire Geoghegan-Quinn.	Minister for Equality and Law Reform	Fianna Fáil	18 November 1994	15 December 1994	44	Albert Reynolds	23rd
3	Eileen Desmond (1932–2005)		Minister for Health	Labour	30 June 1981	9 March 1982	48	Garret FitzGerald	17th
3	Eileen Desmond (1932–2005)		Minister for Social Welfare	Labour	30 June 1981	9 March 1982	48	Garret FitzGerald	17th
4	Gemma Hussey (1938–2024)	–	Minister for Education	Fine Gael	14 December 1982	14 February 1986	44	Garret FitzGerald	18th
4	Gemma Hussey (1938–2024)	–	Minister for Social Welfare	Fine Gael	14 February 1986	10 March 1987	47	Garret FitzGerald	18th
4	Gemma Hussey (1938–2024)	–	Minister for Labour	Fine Gael	20 January 1987	10 March 1987	48	Garret FitzGerald	18th
5	Mary O'Rourke (1937–2024)		Minister for Education	Fianna Fáil	10 March 1987	11 November 1991	49	Charles Haughey	20th
5	Mary O'Rourke (1937–2024)		Minister for Education	Fianna Fáil	10 March 1987	11 November 1991	49	Charles Haughey	21st
5	Mary O'Rourke (1937–2024)		Minister for Health	Fianna Fáil	11 November 1991	11 February 1992	54	Charles Haughey	21st
5	Mary O'Rourke (1937–2024)		Minister for Public Enterprise	Fianna Fáil	26 June 1997	6 June 2002	60	Bertie Ahern	25th
6	Niamh Bhreathnach (1945–2023)	Niamh Bhreathnach.	Minister for Education	Labour	12 January 1993	17 November 1994	47	Albert Reynolds	22rd
6	Niamh Bhreathnach (1945–2023)	Niamh Bhreathnach.	Minister for Education	Labour	15 December 1994	26 June 1997	49	John Bruton	24th
7	Nora Owen (born 1945)	Nora Owen.	Minister for Justice	Fine Gael	15 December 1994	26 June 1997	49	John Bruton	24th
8=	Mary Harney (born 1953)	Mary Harney.	Tánaiste	Progressive Democrats (until 2009) (Note: The Progressive Democrats dissolved in November 2009. Mary Harney then sat as an independent TD and continued to serve as a minister until her resignation on 19 January 2011, shortly before she retired from politics at the 2011 general election.)	26 June 1997	13 September 2006	44	Bertie Ahern	25th
8=	Mary Harney (born 1953)	Mary Harney.	Tánaiste	Progressive Democrats (until 2009)	26 June 1997	13 September 2006	44	Bertie Ahern	26th
8=	Mary Harney (born 1953)	Mary Harney.	Minister for Enterprise, Trade and Employment	Progressive Democrats (until 2009)	26 June 1997	13 September 2004	44	Bertie Ahern	25th
8=	Mary Harney (born 1953)	Mary Harney.	Minister for Enterprise, Trade and Employment	Progressive Democrats (until 2009)	26 June 1997	13 September 2004	44	Bertie Ahern	26th
8=	Mary Harney (born 1953)	Mary Harney.	Minister for Health and Children	Progressive Democrats (until 2009)	29 September 2004	19 January 2011	51	Bertie Ahern	26th
8=	Mary Harney (born 1953)	Mary Harney.	Minister for Health and Children	Progressive Democrats (until 2009)	29 September 2004	19 January 2011	51	Bertie Ahern	27th
8=	Mary Harney (born 1953)	Mary Harney.	Minister for Health and Children	Progressive Democrats (until 2009)	29 September 2004	19 January 2011	51	Brian Cowen	28th
8=	Mary Harney (born 1953)	Mary Harney.	Minister for Health and Children	Independent (2009–2011)	29 September 2004	19 January 2011	51	Brian Cowen	28th
8=	Síle de Valera (born 1954)		Minister for Arts, Heritage, Gaeltacht and the Islands	Fianna Fáil	26 June 1997	6 June 2002	42	Bertie Ahern	25th
10	Mary Coughlan (born 1965)	Mary Coughlan.	Minister for Social and Family Affairs	Fianna Fáil	17 June 2002	29 September 2004	37	Bertie Ahern	26th
10	Mary Coughlan (born 1965)	Mary Coughlan.	Minister for Agriculture, Fisheries and Food	Fianna Fáil	29 September 2004	7 May 2008	39	Bertie Ahern	26th
10	Mary Coughlan (born 1965)	Mary Coughlan.	Minister for Agriculture, Fisheries and Food	Fianna Fáil	29 September 2004	7 May 2008	39	Bertie Ahern	27th
10	Mary Coughlan (born 1965)	Mary Coughlan.	Tánaiste	Fianna Fáil	7 May 2008	9 March 2011	42	Brian Cowen	28th
10	Mary Coughlan (born 1965)	Mary Coughlan.	Minister for Enterprise, Trade and Employment	Fianna Fáil	7 May 2008	23 March 2010	42	Brian Cowen	28th
10	Mary Coughlan (born 1965)	Mary Coughlan.	Minister for Education and Skills	Fianna Fáil	23 March 2010	9 March 2011	44	Brian Cowen	28th
10	Mary Coughlan (born 1965)	Mary Coughlan.	Minister for Health and Children	Fianna Fáil	20 January 2011	9 March 2011	51	Brian Cowen	28th
11	Mary Hanafin (born 1959)	Mary Hanafin.	Minister for Education and Science	Fianna Fáil	29 September 2004	7 May 2008	45	Bertie Ahern	26th
11	Mary Hanafin (born 1959)	Mary Hanafin.	Minister for Education and Science	Fianna Fáil	29 September 2004	7 May 2008	45	Bertie Ahern	27th
11	Mary Hanafin (born 1959)	Mary Hanafin.	Minister for Social and Family Affairs	Fianna Fáil	7 May 2008	23 March 2010	48	Brian Cowen	28th
11	Mary Hanafin (born 1959)	Mary Hanafin.	Minister for Tourism, Culture and Sport	Fianna Fáil	23 March 2010	9 March 2011	50	Brian Cowen	28th
11	Mary Hanafin (born 1959)	Mary Hanafin.	Minister for Enterprise, Trade and Innovation	Fianna Fáil	20 January 2011	9 March 2011	51	Brian Cowen	28th
12=	Joan Burton (born 1949)	Joan Burton.	Minister for Social Protection	Labour	9 March 2011	6 May 2016	62	Enda Kenny	29th
12=	Joan Burton (born 1949)	Joan Burton.	Tánaiste	Labour	4 July 2014	6 May 2016	65	Enda Kenny	29th
12=	Frances Fitzgerald (born 1950)	Frances Fitzgerald.	Minister for Children and Youth Affairs	Fine Gael	9 March 2011	7 May 2014	60	Enda Kenny	29th
12=	Frances Fitzgerald (born 1950)	Frances Fitzgerald.	Minister for Justice	Fine Gael	8 May 2014	14 June 2017	63	Enda Kenny	29th
12=	Frances Fitzgerald (born 1950)	Frances Fitzgerald.	Minister for Justice	Fine Gael	8 May 2014	14 June 2017	63	Enda Kenny	30th
12=	Frances Fitzgerald (born 1950)	Frances Fitzgerald.	Tánaiste	Fine Gael	6 May 2016	28 November 2017	65	Enda Kenny	30th
12=	Frances Fitzgerald (born 1950)	Frances Fitzgerald.	Tánaiste	Fine Gael	6 May 2016	28 November 2017	65	Leo Varadkar	31st
12=	Frances Fitzgerald (born 1950)	Frances Fitzgerald.	Minister for Business, Enterprise and Innovation	Fine Gael	14 June 2017	28 November 2017	66	Leo Varadkar	31st
14=	Jan O'Sullivan (born 1950)	Jan O'Sullivan.	Minister for Education and Skills	Labour	11 July 2014	6 May 2016	53	Enda Kenny	29th
14=	Heather Humphreys (born 1960)	Heather Humphreys	Minister for Arts, Heritage and the Gaeltacht	Fine Gael	11 July 2014	6 May 2016	54	Enda Kenny	29th
14=	Heather Humphreys (born 1960)	Heather Humphreys	Minister for Arts, Heritage, Regional, Rural and Gaeltacht Affairs	Fine Gael	6 May 2016	14 June 2017	55	Enda Kenny	30th
14=	Heather Humphreys (born 1960)	Heather Humphreys	Minister for Culture, Heritage and the Gaeltacht	Fine Gael	14 June 2017	30 November 2017	57	Leo Varadkar	31st
14=	Heather Humphreys (born 1960)	Heather Humphreys	Minister for Business, Enterprise and Innovation	Fine Gael	30 November 2017	27 June 2020	57	Leo Varadkar	31st
14=	Heather Humphreys (born 1960)	Heather Humphreys	Minister for Rural and Community Development	Fine Gael	27 June 2020	17 December 2022	60	Micheál Martin	32nd
14=	Heather Humphreys (born 1960)	Heather Humphreys	Minister for Social Protection	Fine Gael	27 June 2020	17 December 2022	60	Micheál Martin	32nd
14=	Heather Humphreys (born 1960)	Heather Humphreys	Minister for Justice	Fine Gael	27 April 2021	1 November 2021	61	Micheál Martin	32nd
14=	Heather Humphreys (born 1960)	Heather Humphreys	Minister for Justice	Fine Gael	25 November 2022	17 December 2022	59	Micheál Martin	32nd
14=	Heather Humphreys (born 1960)	Heather Humphreys	Minister for Rural and Community Development	Fine Gael	17 December 2022	23 January 2025	59	Leo Varadkar	33rd
14=	Heather Humphreys (born 1960)	Heather Humphreys	Minister for Social Protection	Fine Gael	17 December 2022	23 January 2025	59	Leo Varadkar	33rd
14=	Heather Humphreys (born 1960)	Heather Humphreys	Minister for Social Protection	Fine Gael	17 December 2022	23 January 2025	59	Simon Harris	34th
16=	Mary Mitchell O'Connor (born 1959)	Mary Mitchell O'Connor.	Minister for Jobs, Enterprise and Innovation	Fine Gael	6 May 2016	14 June 2017	56	Enda Kenny	30th
16=	Katherine Zappone (born 1953)	Katherine Zappone.	Minister for Children and Youth Affairs	Independent	6 May 2016	27 June 2020	62	Enda Kenny	30th
16=	Katherine Zappone (born 1953)	Katherine Zappone.	Minister for Children and Youth Affairs	Independent	6 May 2016	27 June 2020	62	Leo Varadkar	31st
18	Regina Doherty (born 1971)	Regina Doherty.	Minister for Employment Affairs and Social Protection	Fine Gael	14 June 2017	27 June 2020	46	Leo Varadkar	31st
19	Josepha Madigan (born 1970)	Josepha Madigan.	Minister for Culture, Heritage and the Gaeltacht	Fine Gael	30 November 2017	27 June 2020	48	Leo Varadkar	31st
20=	Norma Foley (born 1970)	Norma Foley.	Minister for Education	Fianna Fáil	27 June 2020	17 December 2022	50	Micheál Martin	32nd
20=	Norma Foley (born 1970)	Norma Foley.	Minister for Education	Fianna Fáil	17 December 2022	23 January 2025	53	Leo Varadkar	33rd
20=	Norma Foley (born 1970)	Norma Foley.	Minister for Education	Fianna Fáil	17 December 2022	23 January 2025	53	Simon Harris	34th
20=	Norma Foley (born 1970)	Norma Foley.	Minister for Children, Disability and Equality	Fianna Fáil	23 January 2025	Incumbent	55	Micheál Martin	35th
20=	Catherine Martin (born 1972)	Catherine Martin.	Minister for Tourism, Culture, Arts, Gaeltacht, Sport and Media	Green	27 June 2020	17 December 2022	47	Micheál Martin	32nd
20=	Catherine Martin (born 1972)	Catherine Martin.	Minister for Tourism, Culture, Arts, Gaeltacht, Sport and Media	Green	17 December 2022	23 January 2025	50	Leo Varadkar	33rd
20=	Catherine Martin (born 1972)	Catherine Martin.	Minister for Tourism, Culture, Arts, Gaeltacht, Sport and Media	Green	17 December 2022	23 January 2025	50	Simon Harris	34th
20=	Helen McEntee (born 1986)	Helen McEntee.	Minister for Justice	Fine Gael	27 June 2020	27 April 2021	34	Micheál Martin	32nd
20=	Helen McEntee (born 1986)	Helen McEntee.	Minister without portfolio	Fine Gael	27 April 2021	1 November 2021	34	Micheál Martin	32nd
20=	Helen McEntee (born 1986)	Helen McEntee.	Minister for Justice	Fine Gael	1 November 2021	25 November 2022	35	Micheál Martin	32nd
20=	Helen McEntee (born 1986)	Helen McEntee.	Minister without portfolio	Fine Gael	25 November 2022	1 June 2023	36	Leo Varadkar	33rd
20=	Helen McEntee (born 1986)	Helen McEntee.	Minister for Justice	Fine Gael	1 June 2023	23 January 2025	36	Leo Varadkar	33rd
20=	Helen McEntee (born 1986)	Helen McEntee.	Minister for Justice	Fine Gael	1 June 2023	23 January 2025	36	Simon Harris	34th
20=	Helen McEntee (born 1986)	Helen McEntee.	Minister for Education and Youth	Fine Gael	23 January 2025	18 November 2025	38	Micheál Martin	35th
20=	Helen McEntee (born 1986)	Helen McEntee.	Minister for Foreign Affairs and Trade	Fine Gael	18 November 2025	Incumbent	39	Micheál Martin	35th
20=	Helen McEntee (born 1986)	Helen McEntee.	Minister for Defence	Fine Gael	18 November 2025	Incumbent	39	Micheál Martin	35th
23	Jennifer Carroll MacNeill (born 1980)	Jennifer Carroll MacNeill.	Minister for Health	Fine Gael	23 January 2025	Incumbent	44	Micheál Martin	35th
24	Hildegarde Naughton (born 1977)	Hildegarde Naughton.	Minister for Education and Youth	Fine Gael	18 November 2025	Incumbent	48	Micheál Martin	35th

== Number of women ministers in each Cabinet ==
Key to parties: SF = Sinn Féin; PT-SF = Sinn Féin (Pro-Treaty); CnaG = Cumann na nGaedheal; FF = Fianna Fáil; FG = Fine Gael; Lab = Labour; CnaP = Clann na Poblachta; CnaT = Clann na Talmhan; NLP = National Labour Party; Ind. = Independent; PDs = Progressive Democrats; DL = Democratic Left; GP = Green
State	Dáil	Election/Formed	Cabinet	No. of women in cabinet	Party composition	Head	Deputy
Irish Republic	1st	1918 election	1st Ministry	0	SF	Cathal Brugha	N/A
Irish Republic	1st	1919	2nd Ministry	1	SF	Éamon de Valera	N/A
Irish Republic	2nd	1921 elections	3rd Ministry	0	SF	Éamon de Valera	N/A
Irish Republic	2nd	1922 (Jan)	4th Ministry (Note: The Fourth Ministry and First Provisional Government held office simultaneously for many months. The membership of both was merged when the Second Provisional Government came to office after the 1922 general election.)	0	SF (PT)	Arthur Griffith	N/A
Southern Ireland	2nd	1922 election	1st Provisional Government	0	SF (PT)	Michael Collins	N/A
Southern Ireland	3rd	1922 (Aug)	2nd Provisional Government	0	SF (PT) (minority)	W. T. Cosgrave	N/A
Irish Free State	3rd	1922 (Dec)	1st Executive Council	0	SF (PT) (minority)	W. T. Cosgrave	Kevin O'Higgins
Irish Free State	4th	1923 election	2nd Executive Council	0	CNG (minority)	W. T. Cosgrave	Kevin O'Higgins
Irish Free State	5th	1927 (Jun) election	3rd Executive Council	0	CNG (minority)	W. T. Cosgrave	Kevin O'Higgins
Irish Free State	5th	1927 (Jun) election	3rd Executive Council	0	CNG (minority)	W. T. Cosgrave	Ernest Blythe
Irish Free State	6th	1927 (Sep) election	4th Executive Council	0	CNG (minority)	W. T. Cosgrave	Ernest Blythe
Irish Free State	6th	1930	5th Executive Council	0	CNG (minority)	W. T. Cosgrave	Ernest Blythe
Irish Free State	7th	1932 election	6th Executive Council	0	FF (minority)	Éamon de Valera	Seán T. O'Kelly
Irish Free State	8th	1933 election	7th Executive Council	0	FF (minority)	Éamon de Valera	Seán T. O'Kelly
Irish Free State	9th	1937 election	8th Executive Council	0	FF (minority)	Éamon de Valera	Seán T. O'Kelly
Ireland	9th	1937	1st Government	0	FF (minority)	Éamon de Valera	Seán T. O'Kelly
Ireland	10th	1938 election	2nd Government	0	FF	Éamon de Valera	Seán T. O'Kelly
Ireland	11th	1943 election	3rd Government	0	FF (minority)	Éamon de Valera	Seán T. O'Kelly
Ireland	12th	1944 election	4th Government	0	FF	Éamon de Valera	Seán T. O'Kelly
Ireland	13th	1948 election	5th Government	0	FG–Lab–CNP–CNT–NLP–Ind	John A. Costello	William Norton
Ireland	14th	1951 election	6th Government	0	FF (minority)	Éamon de Valera	Seán Lemass
Ireland	15th	1954 election	7th Government	0	FG–Lab–CNT	John A. Costello	William Norton
Ireland	16th	1957 election	8th Government	0	FF	Éamon de Valera	Seán Lemass
Ireland	16th	1959	9th Government	0	FF	Seán Lemass	Seán MacEntee
Ireland	17th	1961 election	10th Government	0	FF (minority)	Seán Lemass	Seán MacEntee
Ireland	18th	1965 election	11th Government	0	FF	Seán Lemass	Frank Aiken
Ireland	18th	1966	12th Government	0	FF	Jack Lynch	Frank Aiken
Ireland	19th	1969 election	13th Government	0	FF	Jack Lynch	Erskine H. Childers
Ireland	20th	1973 election	14th Government	0	FG–Lab	Liam Cosgrave	Brendan Corish
Ireland	21st	1977 election	15th Government	0	FF	Jack Lynch	George Colley
Ireland	21st	1979	16th Government	1	FF	Charles Haughey	George Colley
Ireland	22nd	1981 election	17th Government	0	FG–Lab (minority)	Garret FitzGerald	Michael O'Leary
Ireland	23rd	1982 (Feb) election	18th Government	0	FF (minority)	Charles Haughey	Ray MacSharry
Ireland	24th	1982 (Nov) election	19th Government	1	FG–Lab; FG (minority) from Jan. 1987	Garret FitzGerald	Dick Spring
Ireland	24th	1982 (Nov) election	19th Government	1	FG–Lab; FG (minority) from Jan. 1987	Garret FitzGerald	Peter Barry
Ireland	25th	1987 election	20th Government	1	FF (minority)	Charles Haughey	Brian Lenihan
Ireland	26th	1989 election	21st Government	1	FF–PD	Charles Haughey	Brian Lenihan
Ireland	26th	1989 election	21st Government	1	FF–PD	Charles Haughey	John Wilson
Ireland	26th	1992	22nd Government	1	FF–PD	Albert Reynolds	John Wilson
Ireland	27th	1992 election	23rd Government	2	FF–Lab; FF (minority) from Nov. 1994	Albert Reynolds	Dick Spring
Ireland	27th	1992 election	23rd Government	1	FF–Lab; FF (minority) from Nov. 1994	Albert Reynolds	Bertie Ahern
Ireland	27th	1994	24th Government	2	FG–Lab–DL	John Bruton	Dick Spring
Ireland	28th	1997 election	25th Government	3	FF–PD (minority)	Bertie Ahern	Mary Harney
Ireland	29th	2002 election	26th Government	2	FF–PD	Bertie Ahern	Mary Harney
Ireland	29th	2004	26th Government	4	FF–PD	Bertie Ahern	Mary Harney
Ireland	30th	2007 election	27th Government	3	FF–GP–PD	Bertie Ahern	Brian Cowen
Ireland	30th	2008	28th Government	3	FF–GP–PD FF–GP–Ind from Nov. 2009; FF (minority) from Jan. 2011	Brian Cowen	Mary Coughlan
Ireland	31st	2011 election	29th Government	2	FG–Lab	Enda Kenny	Eamon Gilmore
Ireland	31st	2014	29th Government	4	FG–Lab	Enda Kenny	Joan Burton
Ireland	32nd	2016 election	30th Government	4	FG–Ind (minority)	Enda Kenny	Frances Fitzgerald
Ireland	32nd	2017 (June)	31st Government	4	FG–Ind (minority)	Leo Varadkar	Frances Fitzgerald
Ireland	32nd	2017 (November)	31st Government	4	FG–Ind (minority)	Leo Varadkar	Simon Coveney
Ireland	33rd	2020 election	32nd Government	4	FF–FG–GP	Micheál Martin	Leo Varadkar
Ireland	33rd	2020 election	33rd Government	4	FF–FG–GP	Leo Varadkar	Micheál Martin
Ireland	33rd	2020 election	34th Government	4	FF–FG–GP	Simon Harris	Micheál Martin
Ireland	34th	2024 election	35th Government	4	FF–FG–Ind	Micheál Martin	Simon Harris

== Bibliography ==
- Coakley, John; Gallagher, Michael, eds. (2017). Politics in the Republic of Ireland (6th ed.). Abingdon: Routledge. ISBN 978-1138119451.
- Coleman, Marie (2013). The Irish Revolution, 1916–1923. Abingdon: Routledge. ISBN 9781408279106 – via Google Books.
- Galligan, Yvonne; Buckley, Fiona (2017). "Chapter 9: Women in Politics". In Coakley, John; Gallagher, Michael (eds.). Politics in the Republic of Ireland (6th ed.). Abingdon: Routledge. ISBN 978-1138119451.
- McNamara, Maedhbh; Mooney, Paschal (2000). Women in Parliament: Ireland 1918–2000. Dublin: Wolfhound Press. ISBN 0-86327-759-4.
- McNamara, Maedhbh (2020). A Women's Place is in the Cabinet: Women Ministers in Irish Government 1919 - 2019. Drogheda: Sea Dog Books. ISBN 978-1-913275-06-8.
- O'Toole, John; Dooney, Sean (24 July 2009). Irish Government Today. Dublin: Gill & Macmillan Ltd. ISBN 9780717145522. Archived from the original on 25 January 2018.
- Offen, Karen M. [in French] (2000). European Feminisms, 1700–1950. Stanford, California: Stanford University Press. ISBN 0-8047-3420-8 – via Google Books.
