= Pat Rabbitte =

Irish former politician (born 1949)

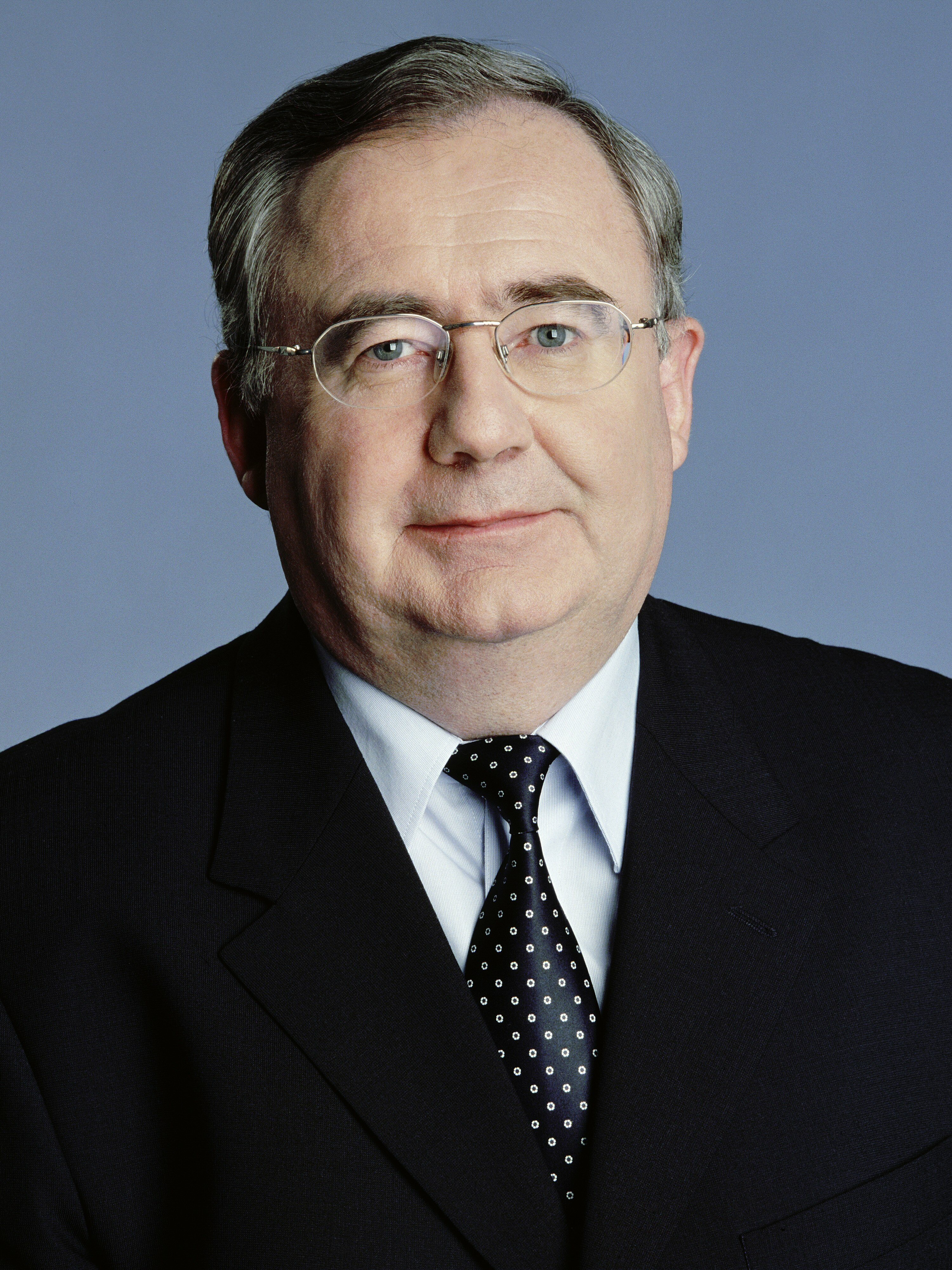
- Rabbitte, c. 2002

Minister for Communications, Energy and Natural Resources
- In office 9 March 2011 – 11 July 2014
- Taoiseach: Enda Kenny
- Preceded by: Pat Carey
- Succeeded by: Alex White

Leader of the Labour Party
- In office 25 October 2002 – 6 September 2007
- Deputy: Liz McManus
- Preceded by: Ruairi Quinn
- Succeeded by: Eamon Gilmore

Minister of State
- 1994–1997: Government
- 1994–1997: Enterprise and Employment

Teachta Dála
- In office June 1989 – February 2016
- Constituency: Dublin South-West

Personal details
- Born: 18 May 1949 (age 77) Claremorris, County Mayo, Ireland
- Party: Labour Party
- Other political affiliations: Democratic Left; Workers' Party
- Spouse: Derry Rabbitte (m. 1981)
- Children: 3
- Education: University College Galway

Pat Rabbitte (born 18 May 1949) is an Irish former Labour Party politician who served as Minister for Communications, Energy and Natural Resources from 2011 to 2014, Leader of the Labour Party from 2002 to 2007 and a Minister of State from 1994 to 1997. He served as a Teachta Dála (TD) for the Dublin South-West constituency from 1989 to 2016.

== Early life ==
Patrick Rabbitte was born near Claremorris in 1949, and was brought up in Woodstock, Ballindine, County Mayo. He was educated locally at St Colman's College, Claremorris before emigrating to Britain to find employment. He returned shortly afterward to attend University College Galway (UCG) where he studied Arts and Law. Whilst at university, Rabbitte became involved in several college movements before serving as President of the UCG Students' Union in 1970–1971. He achieved national attention while serving, between 1972 and 1974, as President of Aontas na Mac Léinn in Éirinn (AMLÉ), formerly the Union of Students in Ireland (USI). Following the completion of his presidency in 1974, he became an official in the Irish Transport and General Workers' Union (ITGWU), becoming National Secretary for the union in 1980.

Rabbitte became involved in electoral politics for the first time in late 1982, when he unsuccessfully contested Dublin South-West for the Workers' Party (WP) at the November general election. He was elected to Dublin County Council in 1985. Having again failed in election at the 1987 general election, though with a greatly improved performance in the same constituency, he finally entered Dáil Éireann as a Teachta Dála (TD) for Dublin South-West at the 1989 election. He retained his seat at every subsequent election until his retirement in 2016—for the first two as a Democratic Left TD, and for subsequent ones representing the Labour Party.

After Tomás Mac Giolla's retirement as President of the WP in 1988, Rabbitte was seen as one of those who wanted to move the party away from its hard left position, and from its alignment with the Soviet Union and international communist and workers' parties. He and some others who had come from the AMLÉ via the trade union movement were seen as wanting to bring the WP toward the centre. This led Rabbitte, Eamon Gilmore and others to earn the nickname "The Student Princes". In 1992, Rabbitte played a prominent role with Proinsias De Rossa in an attempt to jettison some of the party's more hard-left positions. This eventually split the WP. Six of the seven TDs, including Rabbitte, joined Democratic Left.

== Junior Minister: 1994–1997 ==
In 1994, a new Rainbow Coalition government of Fine Gael, the Labour Party and Democratic Left came to office midway through the Dáil term. Rabbitte was appointed as Minister of State to the Government, as well as Minister at the Department of Enterprise and Employment with responsibility for Commerce, Science and Technology. He attended cabinet meetings, but without a vote. During his tenure as a junior minister, Rabbitte was involved in establishing an anti-drugs strategy as well as enacting legislation which gave the credit union movement more authority. Rabbitte also decided to locate the proposed new state-backed Technology Campus for West Dublin, based on high-speed telecommunication links, at CityWest Business Campus beside the N7 motorway, near Clondalkin.

== Labour Party leader and aftermath ==
Following the 1997 general election the Rainbow Coalition lost office. In 1999, Democratic Left merged with the Labour Party, with Rabbitte participating in the negotiations. In October 2002 Rabbitte succeeded Ruairi Quinn as leader of the Labour Party. Under his leadership the party made some gains in the 2004 local elections. Rabbitte has been described as an extremely good performer in the Dáil, often outshining his Fine Gael counterpart Enda Kenny. He was also noted for his anti-Fianna Fáil rhetoric.

Under Rabbitte the Labour Party agreed to enter a pre-election pact with Fine Gael in an attempt to offer the electorate an alternative coalition government at the 2007 general election, which took place in May 2007. This was commonly known as The Mullingar Accord and the proposed alternative government was called the Alliance for Change. The Green Party were also anticipated to be likely members of the coalition government on the basis of agreed points of view on many issues covered by the Mullingar Accord.

The election result did not return a sufficient number of seats for the Alliance for Change to occupy government, even with the support of the Green Party. Rabbitte himself commented on the election result: "This leaves Mr. Ahern in the driving seat". Negotiations between Fianna Fáil and the Green Party resulted in a Fianna Fáil leader Bertie Ahern forming a new government on 13 June 2007.

Following the disappointing result in the election for Labour, Rabbitte announced he was stepping down as leader on 23 August 2007. In his resignation statement, he took responsibility for the outcome of the recent general election, in which his party failed to gain new seats and failed to replace the outgoing government. He was succeeded as party leader by Eamon Gilmore.

Rabbitte gained public attention on 18 November 2010 when he angrily criticised the Minister for Community, Equality and Gaeltacht Affairs, Pat Carey, when they appeared together on Prime Time. An online recording of the outburst was viewed 100,000 times in its first three days there.

Rabbitte was re-elected on the first count in the 2011 general election. His running mate Eamonn Maloney was also elected.

=== Ministerial career: 2011–2014 ===
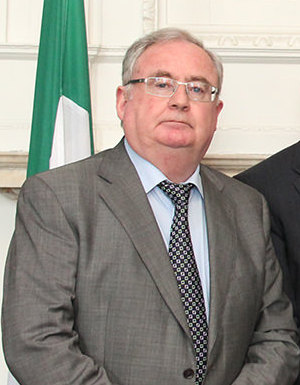
Rabbitte in 2015

On 9 March 2011, Rabbitte was appointed Minister for Communications, Energy and Natural Resources.

The journalist Fintan O'Toole, writing in The Irish Times in August 2011, criticised the lack of royalties system for gas and oil in Ireland. He said: "The State is about to sign away almost all our resources on terms by far the worst in the developed world". Rabbitte responded with a letter, saying the article was inaccurate. Rabbitte's response was in turn criticised by Cian O'Callaghan, a Labour Party member of Fingal County Council, as "misguided".

In July 2014, Rabbitte was replaced by Alex White as part of a reshuffle of the cabinet. He did not contest the 2016 general election.

Political offices
New office	Minister of State to the Government; 1994–1997	Succeeded by Bobby Molloy
Preceded by Séamus Brennan; Mary O'Rourke	Minister of State at the Department of Enterprise and Employment; 1994–1997; With: Eithne FitzGerald	Succeeded by Tom Kitt; Michael Smith
Preceded by Pat Carey	Minister for Communications, Energy and Natural Resources; 2011–2014	Succeeded by Alex White
Party political offices
Preceded by Ruairi Quinn	Leader of the Labour Party; 2002–2007	Succeeded by Eamon Gilmore

Dáil	Election	Deputy (Party)	Deputy (Party)	Deputy (Party)	Deputy (Party)	Deputy (Party)
13th	1948	Seán MacBride (CnaP)	Peadar Doyle (FG)	Bernard Butler (FF)	Michael O'Higgins (FG)	Robert Briscoe (FF)
14th	1951	Seán MacBride (CnaP)	Peadar Doyle (FG)	Bernard Butler (FF)	Michael ffrench-O'Carroll (Ind.)	Robert Briscoe (FF)
15th	1954	Seán MacBride (CnaP)	Peadar Doyle (FG)	Bernard Butler (FF)	Michael O'Higgins (FG)	Robert Briscoe (FF)
15th	1956 by-election	Seán MacBride (CnaP)	Noel Lemass (FF)	Bernard Butler (FF)	Michael O'Higgins (FG)	Robert Briscoe (FF)
16th	1957	James Carroll (Ind.)	Noel Lemass (FF)	Bernard Butler (FF)	Michael O'Higgins (FG)	Robert Briscoe (FF)
16th	1959 by-election	James Carroll (Ind.)	Noel Lemass (FF)	Richie Ryan (FG)	Michael O'Higgins (FG)	Robert Briscoe (FF)
17th	1961	James Carroll (Ind.)	Noel Lemass (FF)	Richie Ryan (FG)	James O'Keeffe (FG)	Robert Briscoe (FF)
18th	1965	John O'Connell (Lab)	Noel Lemass (FF)	Richie Ryan (FG)	Joseph Dowling (FF)	Ben Briscoe (FF)
19th	1969	John O'Connell (Lab)	Noel Lemass (FF)	Seán Dunne (Lab)	Joseph Dowling (FF)	4 seats 1969–1977
19th	1970 by-election	John O'Connell (Lab)	Noel Lemass (FF)	Seán Sherwin (FF)	Joseph Dowling (FF)	4 seats 1969–1977
20th	1973	John O'Connell (Lab)	Noel Lemass (FF)	Declan Costello (FG)	Joseph Dowling (FF)	4 seats 1969–1977
20th	1976 by-election	John O'Connell (Lab)	Brendan Halligan (Lab)	Declan Costello (FG)	Joseph Dowling (FF)	4 seats 1969–1977
21st	1977	Constituency abolished. See Dublin Ballyfermot				

Dáil	Election	Deputy (Party)	Deputy (Party)	Deputy (Party)	Deputy (Party)	Deputy (Party)
22nd	1981	Seán Walsh (FF)	Larry McMahon (FG)	Mary Harney (FF)	Mervyn Taylor (Lab)	4 seats 1981–1992
23rd	1982 (Feb)	Seán Walsh (FF)	Larry McMahon (FG)	Mary Harney (FF)	Mervyn Taylor (Lab)	4 seats 1981–1992
24th	1982 (Nov)	Seán Walsh (FF)	Michael O'Leary (FG)	Mary Harney (FF)	Mervyn Taylor (Lab)	4 seats 1981–1992
25th	1987	Seán Walsh (FF)	Chris Flood (FF)	Mary Harney (PDs)	Mervyn Taylor (Lab)	4 seats 1981–1992
26th	1989	Pat Rabbitte (WP)	Chris Flood (FF)	Mary Harney (PDs)	Mervyn Taylor (Lab)	4 seats 1981–1992
27th	1992	Pat Rabbitte (DL)	Chris Flood (FF)	Mary Harney (PDs)	Mervyn Taylor (Lab)	Éamonn Walsh (Lab)
28th	1997	Pat Rabbitte (DL)	Chris Flood (FF)	Mary Harney (PDs)	Conor Lenihan (FF)	Brian Hayes (FG)
29th	2002	Pat Rabbitte (Lab)	Charlie O'Connor (FF)	Seán Crowe (SF)	Conor Lenihan (FF)	4 seats 2002–2016
30th	2007	Pat Rabbitte (Lab)	Charlie O'Connor (FF)	Brian Hayes (FG)	Conor Lenihan (FF)	4 seats 2002–2016
31st	2011	Pat Rabbitte (Lab)	Eamonn Maloney (Lab)	Brian Hayes (FG)	Seán Crowe (SF)	4 seats 2002–2016
31st	2014 by-election	Pat Rabbitte (Lab)	Eamonn Maloney (Lab)	Paul Murphy (AAA)	Seán Crowe (SF)	4 seats 2002–2016
32nd	2016	Colm Brophy (FG)	John Lahart (FF)	Paul Murphy (AAA–PBP)	Seán Crowe (SF)	Katherine Zappone (Ind.)
33rd	2020	Colm Brophy (FG)	John Lahart (FF)	Paul Murphy (S–PBP)	Seán Crowe (SF)	Francis Noel Duffy (GP)
34th	2024	Colm Brophy (FG)	John Lahart (FF)	Paul Murphy (PBP–S)	Seán Crowe (SF)	Ciarán Ahern (Lab)
