= Liz O'Donnell =

Irish former politician (born 1956)

Minister of State
- 1997–2002: Foreign Affairs
- 2002: Government

Teachta Dála
- In office November 1992 – May 2007
- Constituency: Dublin South

Personal details
- Born: Elizabeth O'Donnell; 1 July 1956 (age 70) Dublin, Ireland
- Party: Progressive Democrats (1985–2009)
- Children: 2
- Education: Trinity College Dublin
- Website: www.lizodonnell.ie

Liz O'Donnell (born 1 July 1956) is an Irish former Progressive Democrats politician, who represented Dublin South as a Teachta Dála (TD) from 1992 to 2007.

== Early and personal life ==
O'Donnell was born in Dublin in 1956, where her father worked for Guinness. She moved with her family to Limerick when she was 11. She was educated at the Salesian Convent, Limerick, and Trinity College Dublin, where she was an honours graduate of the Law School in 1981. Prior to embarking on a political career, O'Donnell was a Vice Chair of the Women's Political Association and a delegate to the National Women's Council. O'Donnell is divorced and has 2 children.

== Political career ==
In 1991, she was elected to Dublin City Council for the Progressive Democrats for the Rathmines local electoral area. She served on the council until 1994.

At the 1992 general election, she was elected to Dáil Éireann for the Progressive Democrats, representing Dublin South. She was opposition spokesperson on Health and Social Welfare from 1992 to 1993. She was Party whip and Justice spokesperson from 1993 to 1997. Following her return to the 28th Dáil at the 1997 general election, she negotiated the Programme for the Coalition Government between Fianna Fáil and the Progressive Democrats, along with her party colleague Minister of State Bobby Molloy.

O'Donnell was appointed Minister of State at the Department of Foreign Affairs with responsibility for Overseas Development Assistance and Human Rights. She was among the representatives of the Irish Government at the multi-party talks at Stormont, which culminated in the Good Friday Agreement in 1998. She was also a member of the Cabinet sub-committee on Asylum Immigration and related matters. Following the resignation of Bobby Molloy she was appointed Minister of State to the Government in April 2002.

She was re-elected to the 29th Dáil at the 2002 general election as TD for Dublin South. In December 2002, she was awarded the Doolin Memorial Medal for her contribution to Overseas Development and Human Rights. She was the Deputy Leader of the Progressive Democrats from 2006 to 2007. She lost her seat at the 2007 general election.

Since leaving public office, she has worked in the media and in public affairs consultancy.

O'Donnell was chairperson of the Road Safety Authority from 2015 to 2024 and has been chair of the Irish Emergency Alliance since 2023. She also sits on the board of Chernobyl Children International.

Party political offices
Preceded by Pat Cox	Deputy leader of the Progressive Democrats; 2006–2007	Succeeded by Noel Grealish
Political offices
Preceded by Joan Burton	Minister of State for Overseas Development Assistance and Human Rights; 1997–2002	Succeeded by Tom Kitt
Preceded by Bobby Molloy	Minister of State to the Government; April–June 2002	Office abolished

Dáil	Election	Deputy (Party)	Deputy (Party)	Deputy (Party)	Deputy (Party)	Deputy (Party)	Deputy (Party)	Deputy (Party)
2nd	1921	Thomas Kelly (SF)	Daniel McCarthy (SF)	Constance Markievicz (SF)	Cathal Ó Murchadha (SF)	4 seats 1921–1923		
3rd	1922	Thomas Kelly (PT-SF)	Daniel McCarthy (PT-SF)	William O'Brien (Lab)	Myles Keogh (Ind.)	4 seats 1921–1923		
4th	1923	Philip Cosgrave (CnaG)	Daniel McCarthy (CnaG)	Constance Markievicz (Rep)	Myles Keogh (Ind.)	Cathal Ó Murchadha (Rep)	Michael Hayes (CnaG)	Peadar Doyle (CnaG)
4th	1923 by-election	Philip Cosgrave (CnaG)	Daniel McCarthy (CnaG)	Constance Markievicz (Rep)	Myles Keogh (Ind.)	Cathal Ó Murchadha (Rep)	Hugh Kennedy (CnaG)	Peadar Doyle (CnaG)
4th	March 1924 by-election	James O'Mara (CnaG)	Daniel McCarthy (CnaG)	Constance Markievicz (Rep)	Myles Keogh (Ind.)	Cathal Ó Murchadha (Rep)	Hugh Kennedy (CnaG)	Peadar Doyle (CnaG)
4th	November 1924 by-election	James O'Mara (CnaG)	Daniel McCarthy (CnaG)	Constance Markievicz (Rep)	Myles Keogh (Ind.)	Cathal Ó Murchadha (Rep)	Seán Lemass (SF)	Peadar Doyle (CnaG)
4th	1925 by-election	James O'Mara (CnaG)	Thomas Hennessy (CnaG)	Constance Markievicz (Rep)	Myles Keogh (Ind.)	Cathal Ó Murchadha (Rep)	Seán Lemass (SF)	Peadar Doyle (CnaG)
5th	1927 (Jun)	James Beckett (CnaG)	Vincent Rice (NL)	Constance Markievicz (FF)	Myles Keogh (Ind.)	Thomas Lawlor (Lab)	Seán Lemass (FF)	Peadar Doyle (CnaG)
5th	1927 by-election	James Beckett (CnaG)	Vincent Rice (NL)	Thomas Hennessy (CnaG)	Myles Keogh (Ind.)	Thomas Lawlor (Lab)	Seán Lemass (FF)	Peadar Doyle (CnaG)
6th	1927 (Sep)	James Beckett (CnaG)	Robert Briscoe (FF)	Thomas Hennessy (CnaG)	Myles Keogh (CnaG)	Frank Kerlin (FF)	Seán Lemass (FF)	Peadar Doyle (CnaG)
7th	1932	James Beckett (CnaG)	Robert Briscoe (FF)	Thomas Hennessy (CnaG)	Myles Keogh (CnaG)	James Lynch (FF)	Seán Lemass (FF)	Peadar Doyle (CnaG)
8th	1933	James Beckett (CnaG)	Robert Briscoe (FF)	James McGuire (CnaG)	Thomas Kelly (FF)	James Lynch (FF)	Seán Lemass (FF)	Peadar Doyle (CnaG)
9th	1937	Myles Keogh (FG)	Robert Briscoe (FF)	Thomas Lawlor (Lab)	Thomas Kelly (FF)	Joseph Hannigan (Ind.)	Seán Lemass (FF)	Peadar Doyle (FG)
10th	1938	James Beckett (FG)	Robert Briscoe (FF)	James Lynch (FF)	Thomas Kelly (FF)	Joseph Hannigan (Ind.)	Seán Lemass (FF)	Peadar Doyle (FG)
10th	1939 by-election	John McCann (FF)	Robert Briscoe (FF)	James Lynch (FF)	Thomas Kelly (FF)	Joseph Hannigan (Ind.)	Seán Lemass (FF)	Peadar Doyle (FG)
11th	1943	Maurice Dockrell (FG)	Robert Briscoe (FF)	James Lynch (FF)	James Larkin Jnr (Lab)	John McCann (FF)	Seán Lemass (FF)	Peadar Doyle (FG)
12th	1944	Maurice Dockrell (FG)	Robert Briscoe (FF)	James Lynch (FF)	James Larkin Jnr (Lab)	John McCann (FF)	Seán Lemass (FF)	Peadar Doyle (FG)
13th	1948	Constituency abolished. See Dublin South-Central, Dublin South-East and Dublin South-West.						

Dáil	Election	Deputy (Party)	Deputy (Party)	Deputy (Party)	Deputy (Party)	Deputy (Party)
22nd	1981	Niall Andrews (FF)	Séamus Brennan (FF)	Nuala Fennell (FG)	John Kelly (FG)	Alan Shatter (FG)
23rd	1982 (Feb)	Niall Andrews (FF)	Séamus Brennan (FF)	Nuala Fennell (FG)	John Kelly (FG)	Alan Shatter (FG)
24th	1982 (Nov)	Niall Andrews (FF)	Séamus Brennan (FF)	Nuala Fennell (FG)	John Kelly (FG)	Alan Shatter (FG)
25th	1987	Tom Kitt (FF)	Séamus Brennan (FF)	Anne Colley (PDs)	John Kelly (FG)	Alan Shatter (FG)
26th	1989	Tom Kitt (FF)	Séamus Brennan (FF)	Nuala Fennell (FG)	Roger Garland (GP)	Alan Shatter (FG)
27th	1992	Tom Kitt (FF)	Séamus Brennan (FF)	Liz O'Donnell (PDs)	Eithne FitzGerald (Lab)	Alan Shatter (FG)
28th	1997	Tom Kitt (FF)	Séamus Brennan (FF)	Liz O'Donnell (PDs)	Olivia Mitchell (FG)	Alan Shatter (FG)
29th	2002	Tom Kitt (FF)	Séamus Brennan (FF)	Liz O'Donnell (PDs)	Olivia Mitchell (FG)	Eamon Ryan (GP)
30th	2007	Tom Kitt (FF)	Séamus Brennan (FF)	Alan Shatter (FG)	Olivia Mitchell (FG)	Eamon Ryan (GP)
30th	2009 by-election	Tom Kitt (FF)	George Lee (FG)	Alan Shatter (FG)	Olivia Mitchell (FG)	Eamon Ryan (GP)
31st	2011	Shane Ross (Ind.)	Peter Mathews (FG)	Alan Shatter (FG)	Olivia Mitchell (FG)	Alex White (Lab)
32nd	2016	Constituency abolished. See Dublin Rathdown, Dublin South-West and Dún Laoghaire.				
