= Inter-Party Government =

The term "Inter-Party Government" may refer to:

- the First Inter-Party Government, government of Ireland from 1948 to 1951
- the Second Inter-Party Government, government of Ireland from 1954 to 1957
- any coalition government
