= John O'Donovan (politician) =

Irish politician (1908–1982)

Parliamentary Secretary
- 1954–1957: Government

Teachta Dála
- In office July 1969 – February 1973
- Constituency: Dublin South-Central
- In office June 1954 – March 1957
- Constituency: Dublin South-East

Senator
- In office 22 May 1957 – 14 December 1961
- Constituency: Cultural and Educational Panel

Personal details
- Born: 23 January 1908 Macroom, County Cork, Ireland
- Died: 17 May 1982 (aged 74) Dublin, Ireland
- Party: Labour Party (from 1965); Fine Gael (1954–1965)
- Spouse: Kathleen Mahon (m. 1936)
- Children: 6
- Education: University College Dublin; University College, Oxford

John O'Donovan (23 January 1908 – 17 May 1982) was an Irish politician.

== Early and personal life ==
He was born 23 January 1908 in Rockboro House, Macroom, County Cork, the son of Cornelius O'Donovan originally from Clonmel, an agricultural instructor, and his wife Hanna (née Twomey). He was educated at Catholic University School, Dublin, and obtained an entrance scholarship to University College Dublin (UCD), where he graduated BA in 1928 with first class honours in economics, history and jurisprudence. In 1929 he took a first class honours MA in economics and was awarded a travelling studentship, which he held at University College, Oxford, where he graduated B.Litt. in 1931. A Rockefeller Fellowship enabled him to spend the academic year 1931–1932 at Harvard University's graduate School, the Brookings Institution and the University of Chicago. In 1940 he was awarded a D.Econ.Sc. from the National University of Ireland for The economic history of live stock in Ireland.

In 1933 he joined the Irish civil service as an administrative officer, being assigned first to the Department of the President of the Executive Council, followed by temporary secondment to the secretariat of the League of Nations. From 1935 he was an administrative officer in the Department of Finance, becoming private secretary to the minister, Seán T. O'Kelly in 1941. He was promoted assistant principal in 1943, and to principal in 1950; he dealt with the financial aspects of legislation and the finances of state-sponsored bodies. Described by T. K. Whitaker as having 'outstanding economic qualifications', his promotion to principal had been in breach of the usual seniority principle. In 1952 he left the civil service on his appointment as statutory lecturer in economic theory at UCD. He became associate professor of political economy in 1966, a position he held until his retirement from UCD in 1976.

== Politics ==
He was elected to Dáil Éireann as a Fine Gael Teachta Dála (TD) for the Dublin South-East constituency at the 1954 general election. On his first day in the Dáil, O'Donovan was appointed Parliamentary Secretary to the Government. His close political relationship with John A. Costello was underlined by the taoiseach's decision to appoint him as special economic adviser to the cabinet and by his attendance at cabinet meetings.

He lost his seat at the 1957 general election, but was elected to Seanad Éireann by the Cultural and Educational Panel, where he served until 1961. He was unsuccessful candidate at the 1961 and 1965 general elections. At the 1969 general election O'Donovan returned to the Dáil as a Labour Party deputy for Dublin South-Central. O'Donovan lost his seat again at the 1973 general election.

=== Electoral law challenged ===
O'Donovan challenged the Electoral (Amendment) Act 1959, which had been passed by the Fianna Fáil government, on the basis that there were "grave inequalities" with "no relevant circumstances to justify" them. In O'Donovan v. Attorney-General (1961), the High Court held that the Act was unconstitutional and suggested that the ratio of representation to population across constituencies should differ by no more than 5%. The court, interpreting the "so far as it is practicable" condition of the Constitution, suggested a 5% variation as the limit without exceptional circumstances.

== Later life ==
He lived for most of his life in Dundrum, Dublin with his wife Kathleen Mahon of Tullamore, whom he married in 1936. They had one son and five daughters. He died on 17 May 1982 at Kilcroney nursing home, Dublin.

Political offices
Preceded by Jack Lynch	Parliamentary Secretary to the Government; 1954–1957	Office abolished

Dáil	Election	Deputy (Party)	Deputy (Party)	Deputy (Party)	Deputy (Party)
13th	1948	John A. Costello (FG)	Seán MacEntee (FF)	Noël Browne (CnaP)	3 seats 1948–1981
14th	1951	John A. Costello (FG)	Seán MacEntee (FF)	Noël Browne (Ind.)	3 seats 1948–1981
15th	1954	John A. Costello (FG)	Seán MacEntee (FF)	John O'Donovan (FG)	3 seats 1948–1981
16th	1957	John A. Costello (FG)	Seán MacEntee (FF)	Noël Browne (Ind.)	3 seats 1948–1981
17th	1961	John A. Costello (FG)	Seán MacEntee (FF)	Noël Browne (NPD)	3 seats 1948–1981
18th	1965	John A. Costello (FG)	Seán MacEntee (FF)	Seán Moore (FF)	3 seats 1948–1981
19th	1969	Garret FitzGerald (FG)	Noël Browne (Lab)	Seán Moore (FF)	3 seats 1948–1981
20th	1973	Garret FitzGerald (FG)	Fergus O'Brien (FG)	Seán Moore (FF)	3 seats 1948–1981
21st	1977	Garret FitzGerald (FG)	Ruairi Quinn (Lab)	Seán Moore (FF)	3 seats 1948–1981
22nd	1981	Garret FitzGerald (FG)	Gerard Brady (FF)	Seán Moore (FF)	Richie Ryan (FG)
23rd	1982 (Feb)	Garret FitzGerald (FG)	Gerard Brady (FF)	Ruairi Quinn (Lab)	Alexis FitzGerald Jnr (FG)
24th	1982 (Nov)	Garret FitzGerald (FG)	Gerard Brady (FF)	Ruairi Quinn (Lab)	Joe Doyle (FG)
25th	1987	Garret FitzGerald (FG)	Gerard Brady (FF)	Ruairi Quinn (Lab)	Michael McDowell (PDs)
26th	1989	Garret FitzGerald (FG)	Gerard Brady (FF)	Ruairi Quinn (Lab)	Joe Doyle (FG)
27th	1992	Frances Fitzgerald (FG)	Eoin Ryan Jnr (FF)	Ruairi Quinn (Lab)	Michael McDowell (PDs)
28th	1997	Frances Fitzgerald (FG)	Eoin Ryan Jnr (FF)	Ruairi Quinn (Lab)	John Gormley (GP)
29th	2002	Michael McDowell (PDs)	Eoin Ryan Jnr (FF)	Ruairi Quinn (Lab)	John Gormley (GP)
30th	2007	Lucinda Creighton (FG)	Chris Andrews (FF)	Ruairi Quinn (Lab)	John Gormley (GP)
31st	2011	Lucinda Creighton (FG)	Eoghan Murphy (FG)	Ruairi Quinn (Lab)	Kevin Humphreys (Lab)
32nd	2016	Constituency abolished. See Dublin Bay South.			

Dáil	Election	Deputy (Party)	Deputy (Party)	Deputy (Party)	Deputy (Party)	Deputy (Party)
13th	1948	Seán Lemass (FF)	James Larkin Jnr (Lab)	Con Lehane (CnaP)	Maurice E. Dockrell (FG)	John McCann (FF)
14th	1951	Seán Lemass (FF)	James Larkin Jnr (Lab)	Philip Brady (FF)	Maurice E. Dockrell (FG)	John McCann (FF)
15th	1954	Seán Lemass (FF)	James Larkin Jnr (Lab)	Thomas Finlay (FG)	Maurice E. Dockrell (FG)	Celia Lynch (FF)
16th	1957	Seán Lemass (FF)	Jack Murphy (Ind.)	Philip Brady (FF)	Maurice E. Dockrell (FG)	Celia Lynch (FF)
16th	1958 by-election	Seán Lemass (FF)	Patrick Cummins (FF)	Philip Brady (FF)	Maurice E. Dockrell (FG)	Celia Lynch (FF)
17th	1961	Seán Lemass (FF)	Patrick Cummins (FF)	Philip Brady (FF)	Maurice E. Dockrell (FG)	Joseph Barron (CnaP)
18th	1965	Seán Lemass (FF)	Frank Cluskey (Lab)	Philip Brady (FF)	Maurice E. Dockrell (FG)	Thomas J. Fitzpatrick (FF)
19th	1969	Richie Ryan (FG)	Ben Briscoe (FF)	Philip Brady (FF)	John O'Donovan (Lab)	4 seats 1969–1977
20th	1973	Richie Ryan (FG)	Ben Briscoe (FF)	Philip Brady (FF)	John Kelly (FG)	4 seats 1969–1977
21st	1977	Fergus O'Brien (FG)	Frank Cluskey (Lab)	Thomas J. Fitzpatrick (FF)	3 seats 1977–1981	
22nd	1981	Fergus O'Brien (FG)	Ben Briscoe (FF)	Thomas J. Fitzpatrick (FF)	Gay Mitchell (FG)	John O'Connell (Note: O'Connell served as Ceann Comhairle in the 22nd and 23rd Dáil from 1981 to 1983 and was returned automatically at the February 1982 and November 1982 general elections. He joined Fianna Fáil in January 1985.) (Ind.)
23rd	1982 (Feb)	Frank Cluskey (Lab)	Ben Briscoe (FF)	Thomas J. Fitzpatrick (FF)	Gay Mitchell (FG)	John O'Connell (Ind.)
24th	1982 (Nov)	Frank Cluskey (Lab)	Ben Briscoe (FF)	Fergus O'Brien (FG)	Gay Mitchell (FG)	John O'Connell (Ind.)
25th	1987	Frank Cluskey (Lab)	Ben Briscoe (FF)	Fergus O'Brien (FG)	Gay Mitchell (FG)	Mary Mooney (FF)
26th	1989	John O'Connell (FF)	Ben Briscoe (FF)	Fergus O'Brien (FG)	Gay Mitchell (FG)	Eric Byrne (WP)
27th	1992	John O'Connell (FF)	Ben Briscoe (FF)	Pat Upton (Lab)	Gay Mitchell (FG)	4 seats 1992–2002
27th	1994 by-election	Eric Byrne (DL)	Ben Briscoe (FF)	Pat Upton (Lab)	Gay Mitchell (FG)	4 seats 1992–2002
28th	1997	Seán Ardagh (FF)	Ben Briscoe (FF)	Pat Upton (Lab)	Gay Mitchell (FG)	4 seats 1992–2002
28th	1999 by-election	Seán Ardagh (FF)	Ben Briscoe (FF)	Mary Upton (Lab)	Gay Mitchell (FG)	4 seats 1992–2002
29th	2002	Seán Ardagh (FF)	Aengus Ó Snodaigh (SF)	Mary Upton (Lab)	Gay Mitchell (FG)	Michael Mulcahy (FF)
30th	2007	Seán Ardagh (FF)	Aengus Ó Snodaigh (SF)	Mary Upton (Lab)	Catherine Byrne (FG)	Michael Mulcahy (FF)
31st	2011	Eric Byrne (Lab)	Aengus Ó Snodaigh (SF)	Joan Collins (PBP)	Catherine Byrne (FG)	Michael Conaghan (Lab)
32nd	2016	Bríd Smith (AAA–PBP)	Aengus Ó Snodaigh (SF)	Joan Collins (Note: Founded Right to Change in May 2020.) (I4C)	Catherine Byrne (FG)	4 seats from 2016
33rd	2020	Bríd Smith (S–PBP)	Aengus Ó Snodaigh (SF)	Joan Collins (I4C)	Patrick Costello (GP)	4 seats from 2016
34th	2024	Catherine Ardagh (FF)	Aengus Ó Snodaigh (SF)	Máire Devine (SF)	Jen Cummins (SD)	4 seats from 2016
