= Government of the 15th Dáil =

Irish Government from 1954 to 1957

7th government of Ireland
- Government of Ireland

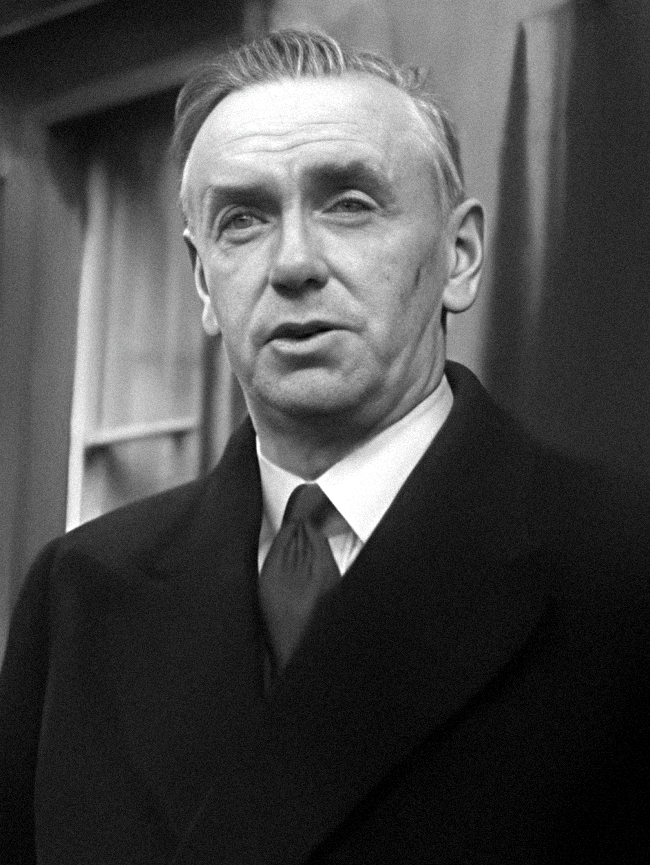
- Date formed: 2 June 1954
- Date dissolved: 20 March 1957

People and organisations
- President: Seán T. O'Kelly
- Taoiseach: John A. Costello
- Tánaiste: William Norton
- Total no. of members: 13 (14 from 1956)
- Member parties: Fine Gael; Labour Party; Clann na Talmhan
- Status in legislature: Minority coalition 73 / 147 (50%)
- Opposition party: Fianna Fáil
- Opposition leader: Éamon de Valera

History
- Election: 1954 general election
- Legislature terms: 15th Dáil; 8th Seanad
- Predecessor: 6th government
- Successor: 8th government

The 7th government of Ireland (2 June 1954 – 20 March 1957), commonly known as the second inter-party government, was the government of Ireland formed after the 1954 general election to the 15th Dáil held on 18 May. It was a minority government of Fine Gael, the Labour Party and Clann na Talmhan. Clann na Poblachta, which had been in the First inter-party government (1948–1951) with these parties, supported the government but did not form part of it. It lasted for 2 years, 291 days.

== Nomination of Taoiseach ==
The 15th Dáil first met on 2 June 1954. In the debate on the nomination of Taoiseach, Fianna Fáil leader and outgoing Taoiseach Éamon de Valera and former Taoiseach John A. Costello of Fine Gael were both proposed. The nomination of de Valera was defeated with 66 votes cast in favour and 78 against, while the nomination of Costello was approved by 79 to 66. Costello was appointed as Taoiseach by President Seán T. O'Kelly.

2 June 1954; Nomination of John A. Costello (FG) as Taoiseach; Motion proposed by Richard Mulcahy and seconded by William Norton; Absolute majority: 74/147
Vote	Parties	Votes
Yes	Fine Gael (50), Labour Party (18), Clann na Talmhan (5), Clann na Poblachta (3), Independents (3)	79 / 147
No	Fianna Fáil (65), Independent (1)	66 / 147
Not voting	Ceann Comhairle (1), Independent (1)	2 / 147

== Members of the Government ==
The Ministers of the Government were proposed by the Taoiseach and approved by the Dáil. They were appointed by the president on the same day.

Office	Name	Term	Party
Taoiseach	John A. Costello	1954–1957	Fine Gael
Tánaiste	William Norton	1954–1957	Labour Party
Minister for Industry and Commerce	William Norton	1954–1957	Labour Party
Minister for Education	Richard Mulcahy	1954–1957	Fine Gael
Minister for Lands	Joseph Blowick	1954–1957	Clann na Talmhan
Minister for Justice	James Everett	1954–1957	Labour
Minister for Agriculture	James Dillon	1954–1957	Fine Gael
Minister for Defence	Seán Mac Eoin	1954–1957	Fine Gael
Minister for Posts and Telegraphs	Michael Keyes	1954–1957	Labour
Minister for External Affairs	Liam Cosgrave	1954–1957	Fine Gael
Minister for Social Welfare	Brendan Corish	1954–1957	Labour
Minister for Finance	Gerard Sweetman	1954–1957	Fine Gael
Minister for Local Government	Patrick O'Donnell	1954–1957	Fine Gael
Minister for Health	Tom O'Higgins	1954–1957	Fine Gael
=== Change 2 July 1956 === Establishment of the Department of the Gaeltacht.
Office	Name	Term	Party
Minister for the Gaeltacht	Richard Mulcahy	1956	Fine Gael
=== Changes 24 October 1956 === Assignment of separate Minister for the Gaeltacht.
Office	Name	Term	Party
Minister for the Gaeltacht	Patrick Lindsay	1956–1957	Fine Gael

== Parliamentary Secretaries ==
On 3 June 1954, the government appointed the Parliamentary Secretaries on the nomination of the Taoiseach.

Name	Office	Term	Party
Denis J. O'Sullivan	Government Chief Whip	1954–1957	Fine Gael
Denis J. O'Sullivan	Parliamentary Secretary to the Minister for Defence	1954–1957	Fine Gael
John O'Donovan	Parliamentary Secretary to the Government	1954–1957	Fine Gael
Michael Donnellan	Parliamentary Secretary to the Minister for Finance	1954–1957	Clann na Talmhan
William Davin	Parliamentary Secretary to the Minister for Local Government	1954–1956	Labour
Oliver J. Flanagan	Parliamentary Secretary to the Minister for Agriculture	1954–1957	Fine Gael
Patrick Crotty	Parliamentary Secretary to the Minister for Industry and Commerce	1954–1957	Fine Gael
=== Change 16 March 1956 === Following the death of William Davin on 1 March 1956.
Name	Office	Term	Party
Dan Spring	Parliamentary Secretary to the Minister for Local Government	1956–1957	Labour
=== Changes 3 July 1956 === Following the establishment of the Department of the Gaeltacht
Name	Office	Term	Party
Patrick Lindsay	Parliamentary Secretary to the Minister for the Gaeltacht	Jul.–Oct. 1956	Fine Gael
Patrick Lindsay	Parliamentary Secretary to the Minister for Education	Jul.–Oct. 1956	Fine Gael

== Foreign Policy ==
Ireland joined the United Nations in 1955.

== Dissolution of the Dáil ==
The government ended when the Clann na Poblachta withdrew its support in 1957. Fine Gael and Labour had also both lost seats in by-elections to Fianna Fáil the previous year. Costello sought a dissolution of the Dáil on 4 February 1957 which was granted by the president, leading to a general election on 9 March 1957.
