= Minister of State to the Government =

The minister of state to the Government was a junior ministerial post of the Government of Ireland between 1994 and 2002. The minister of state did not hold cabinet rank but sat in attendance at government meetings without a vote. The position previously existed as the Parliamentary Secretary to the Executive Council from 1922 to 1926, and as Parliamentary Secretary to the Government from 1951 to 1957.

== List of office-holders ==
=== Parliamentary Secretary to the Executive Council 1922–1926 ===
Name	Term of office		Party	Government
Eamonn Duggan	6 December 1922	9 May 1926	Cumann na nGaedheal	1st EC • 2nd EC
=== Parliamentary Secretary to the Government 1951–1957 ===
Name	Term of office		Party	Government
Jack Lynch	19 June 1951	2 June 1954	Fianna Fáil	6th
John O'Donovan	3 June 1954	20 March 1957	Fine Gael	7th
=== Minister of State to the Government 1994–2002 ===
Name	Term of office		Party	Government
Pat Rabbitte	15 December 1994	26 June 1997	Democratic Left	24th
Bobby Molloy	26 June 1997	9 April 2002	Progressive Democrats	25th
Liz O'Donnell	11 April 2002	6 June 2002	Progressive Democrats	25th
