= Government of the 28th Dáil =

Government of Ireland from 1997 to 2002

25th government of Ireland
- Government of Ireland

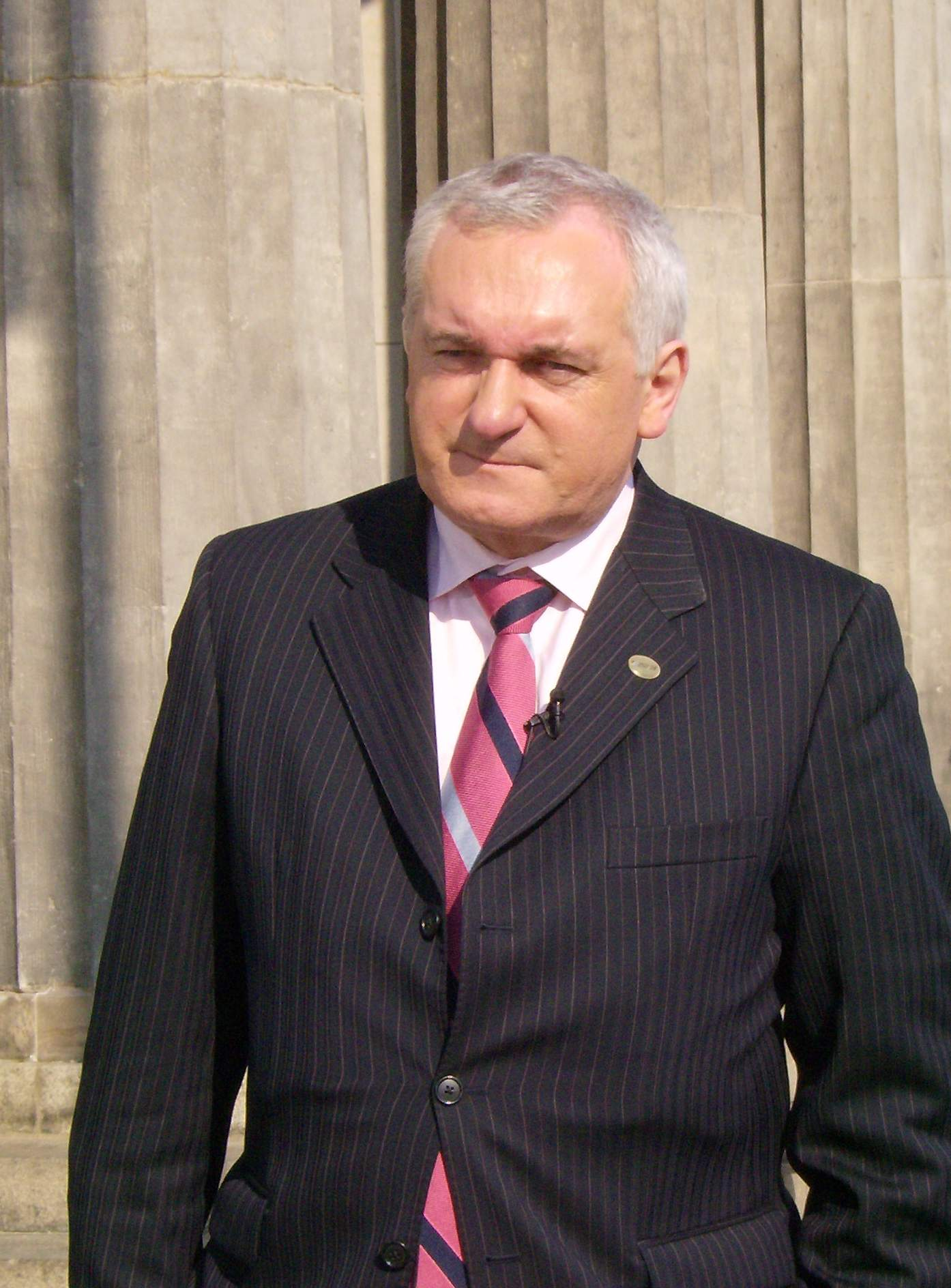
- Date formed: 26 June 1997
- Date dissolved: 6 June 2002

People and organisations
- President: Mary Robinson (1997); Mary McAleese (1997–2002)
- Taoiseach: Bertie Ahern
- Tánaiste: Mary Harney
- Total no. of members: 15
- Member parties: Fianna Fáil; Progressive Democrats
- Status in legislature: Coalition
- Opposition party: Fine Gael
- Opposition leader: John Bruton (1997–2001); Michael Noonan (2001–2002)

History
- Election: 1997 general election
- Legislature terms: 28th Dáil; 21st Seanad
- Predecessor: 24th government
- Successor: 26th government

The 25th government of Ireland (26 June 1997 – 6 June 2002) was the government of Ireland formed after the 1997 general election to the 28th Dáil held on 6 June 1997. It was a minority coalition government of Fianna Fáil and the Progressive Democrats, led by Fianna Fáil leader Bertie Ahern as Taoiseach. It lasted 4 years, 345 days.

== Nomination of Taoiseach ==
The 28th Dáil first met on 26 June 1997. In the debate on the nomination of Taoisech, both outgoing Taoiseach and Fine Gael leader John Bruton and Fianna Fáil leader Bertie Ahern were proposed. The vote on Bruton was defeated with 75 votes in favour to 87 against, while the vote on Ahern was approved by 85 to 78. Ahern was then appointed as Taoiseach by President Mary Robinson.

26 June 1997; Nomination of Bertie Ahern (FF) as Taoiseach; Motion proposed by David Andrews and seconded by Mary O'Rourke; Absolute majority: 84/166
Vote	Parties	Votes
Yes	Fianna Fáil (77), Progressive Democrats (4), Independent (3), Sinn Féin (1)	85 / 166
No	Fine Gael (54), Labour Party (16), Democratic Left (4), Green Party (2), Independent (1), Socialist Party (1)	78 / 166
Not voting	Independent (2), Ceann Comhairle (1)	3 / 166

== Government ministers ==
After his appointment by the president, Bertie Ahern proposed the members of the government and they were approved by the Dáil. They were appointed by the president on the same day.

Office	Name	Term	Party
Taoiseach	Bertie Ahern	1997–2002	Fianna Fáil
Tánaiste	Mary Harney	1997–2002	Progressive Democrats
Minister for Enterprise, Trade and Employment (Note: The Department of Enterprise and Employment was renamed the Department of Enterprise, Trade and Employment on 8 July 1997.)	Mary Harney	1997–2002	Progressive Democrats
Minister for Marine and Natural Resources (Note: The Department of the Marine was renamed the Department of Marine and Natural Resources on 12 July 1997.)	Michael Woods	1997–2000	Fianna Fáil
Minister for Foreign Affairs	Ray Burke	1997	Fianna Fáil
Minister for Public Enterprise (Note: The Department of Transport, Energy and Communications was renamed the Department of Public Enterprise on 12 July 1997.)	Mary O'Rourke	1997–2002	Fianna Fáil
Minister for Defence	David Andrews	1997	Fianna Fáil
Minister for Agriculture and Food (Note: The Department of Agriculture, Food and Forestry was renamed the Department of Agriculture and Food on 12 July 1997.) (Note: The Department of Agriculture and Food was renamed the Department of Agriculture, Food and Rural Development on 27 September 1999.)	Joe Walsh	1997–2002	Fianna Fáil
Minister for Finance	Charlie McCreevy	1997–2002	Fianna Fáil
Minister for Health and Children (Note: The Department of Health was renamed the Department of Health and Children on 12 July 1997.)	Brian Cowen	1997–2000	Fianna Fáil
Minister for the Environment and Local Government (Note: The Department of the Environment was renamed the Department of the Environment and Local Government on 22 July 1997.)	Noel Dempsey	1997–2002	Fianna Fáil
Minister for Social, Community and Family Affairs (Note: The Department of Social Welfare was renamed the Department of Social, Community and Family Affairs on 12 July 1997.)	Dermot Ahern	1997–2002	Fianna Fáil
Minister for Arts, Heritage, Gaeltacht and the Islands (Note: The Department of Arts, Culture and the Gaeltacht was renamed the Department of Arts, Heritage, Gaeltacht and the Islands on 12 July 1997.)	Síle de Valera	1997–2002	Fianna Fáil
Minister for Justice, Equality and Law Reform (Note: The functions of the Department of Equality and Law Reform were transferred to the Department of Justice on 8 July 1997. The Department of Justice was renamed the Department of Justice, Equality and Law Reform on 9 July.)	John O'Donoghue (Note: John O'Donoghue was appointed as Minister for Justice and Minister for Equality and Law Reform and served as head of both departments until the transfer of functions on 8 July.)	1997–2002	Fianna Fáil
Minister for Tourism, Sport and Recreation (Note: The Department of Tourism and Trade was renamed the Department of Tourism, Sport and Recreation on 12 July 1997.)	Jim McDaid	1997–2002	Fianna Fáil
Minister for Education and Science (Note: The Department of Education was renamed the Department of Education and Science on 1 October 1997.)	Micheál Martin	1997–2000	Fianna Fáil
=== Changes 8 October 1997 === Following the resignation of Ray Burke after allegations of corrupt payments under investigation by the Flood Tribunal.
Office	Name	Term	Party
Minister for Foreign Affairs	David Andrews	1997–2000	Fianna Fáil
Minister for Defence	Michael Smith	1997–2002	Fianna Fáil
=== Changes 27 January 2000 === Following the retirement from government of David Andrews.
Office	Name	Term	Party
Minister for Education and Science	Michael Woods	2000–2002	Fianna Fáil
Minister for Foreign Affairs	Brian Cowen	2000–2002	Fianna Fáil
Minister for Health and Children	Micheál Martin	2000–2002	Fianna Fáil
Minister for Marine and Natural Resources	Frank Fahey	2000–2002	Fianna Fáil

Changes to Departments

== Attorney General ==
David Byrne SC was appointed by the president as Attorney General on the nomination of the Taoiseach. In 1999, he resigned on his nomination as European Commissioner. On 7 July 1999, Michael McDowell SC was appointed by the president as Attorney General on the nomination of the Taoiseach.

== Ministers of state ==
=== Appointments 26 June 1997 === The government on the nomination of the Taoiseach appointed ministers of state in attendance at cabinet meetings without a vote.
Name	Department(s)	Responsibility	Party
Séamus Brennan	Taoiseach; Defence	Government Chief Whip	Fianna Fáil
Bobby Molloy	Minister of State to the Government; Environment and Local Government	Housing and urban renewal	Progressive Democrats
=== Appointments 1 July 1997 === The government on the nomination of the Taoiseach appointed Michael Smith and Liz O'Donnell.
Name	Department(s)	Responsibility	Party
Michael Smith	Education and Science; Enterprise, Trade and Employment	Science and technology	Fianna Fáil
Liz O'Donnell	Foreign Affairs	Overseas development assistance and human rights	Progressive Democrats
=== Appointments 8 July 1997 === The government on the nomination of the Taoiseach appointed 13 further ministers of state.
Name	Department(s)	Responsibility	Party
Noel Davern	Agriculture and Food	Livestock breeding and horticulture	Fianna Fáil
Joe Jacob	Public Enterprise	Energy	Fianna Fáil
Frank Fahey	Health and Children	Children	Fianna Fáil
Willie O'Dea	Education and Science	Adult education, youth affairs and school transport	Fianna Fáil
Tom Kitt	Enterprise, Trade and Employment; Enterprise, Trade and Employment	Labour affairs, consumer rights and international trade	Fianna Fáil
Chris Flood	Tourism, Sport and Recreation	Local development and the National Drugs Strategy Team	Fianna Fáil
Dan Wallace	Environment and Local Government	Environmental information and awareness and the Environmental Protection Agency	Fianna Fáil
Ned O'Keeffe	Agriculture and Food	Food	Fianna Fáil
Hugh Byrne	Marine and Natural Resources	Aquaculture and forestry	Fianna Fáil
Mary Wallace	Justice, Equality and Law Reform	Equality and disabilities	Fianna Fáil
Martin Cullen	Finance	Office of Public Works	Fianna Fáil
Éamon Ó Cuív	Arts, Heritage, Gaeltacht and the Islands	Gaeltacht and the islands	Fianna Fáil
Tom Moffatt	Health and Children	Food safety and older people	Fianna Fáil
=== Changes 9 October 1997 === Following the appointment of Michael Smith as Minister for Defence on 8 October.
Name	Department(s)	Responsibility	Party
Noel Treacy	Education and Science; Enterprise, Trade and Employment	Science and technology	Fianna Fáil
=== Changes 21 January 1998 === Expansion of scope of Minister of State for Children.
Name	Department(s)	Responsibility	Party
Frank Fahey	Health and Children; Justice, Equality and Law Reform; Education and Science	Children	Fianna Fáil
=== Changes 1 February 2000 === Following the resignation of Chris Flood and the appointment of Frank Fahey as Minister for the Marine and Natural Resources.
Name	Department(s)	Responsibility	Party
Eoin Ryan	Tourism, Sport and Recreation	Local development	Fianna Fáil
Mary Hanafin	Health and Children; Justice, Equality and Law Reform; Education and Science	Children	Fianna Fáil
=== Changes 19 February 2001 === Following the resignation of Ned O'Keeffe on 17 February.
Name	Department(s)	Responsibility	Party
Éamon Ó Cuív	Agriculture, Food and Rural Development	Rural development and the Western Development Commission	Fianna Fáil
Mary Coughlan	Arts, Heritage, Gaeltacht and the Islands	Gaeltacht and the Islands	Fianna Fáil
=== Changes 11 April 2002 === Following the resignation of Bobby Molloy as a Minister of State on 10 April 2002. O'Donnell continued in her position as Minister of State at the Department of Foreign Affairs. Molloy's position as Minister of State at the Department of the Environment and Local Government was not filled.
Name	Department(s)	Responsibility	Party
Liz O'Donnell	Minister of State to the Government		Progressive Democrats

== Confidence in the government ==
After evidence given by Ahern at the Moriarty Tribunal, a motion of no confidence was proposed in the government. This was then debated on 30 June 2000 as a motion of confidence in the government, proposed by the Taoiseach. It was approved by the Dáil.

== Dissolution ==
On 25 April 2002, the president dissolved the Dáil on the advice of the Taoiseach, and a general election was held on 17 May. The 29th Dáil met on 6 June and Bertie Ahern was re-appointed as Taoiseach and formed a new government.
