= 24th government of Ireland =

Government of Ireland from December 1994 to June 1997

- Government of Ireland

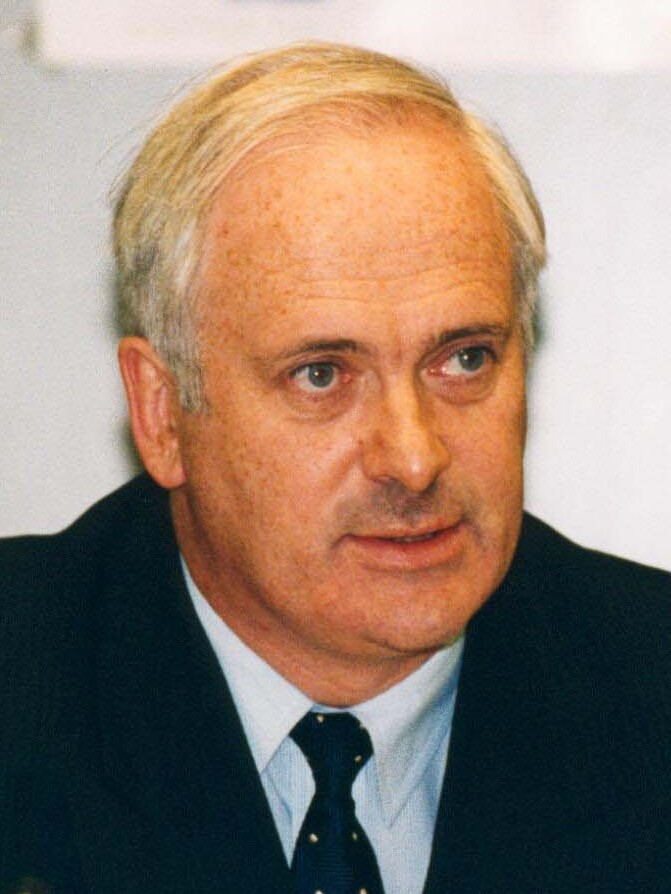
- Date formed: 15 December 1994
- Date dissolved: 26 June 1997

People and organisations
- President: Mary Robinson
- Taoiseach: John Bruton
- Tánaiste: Dick Spring
- Total no. of members: 15
- Member parties: Fine Gael; Labour Party; Democratic Left
- Status in legislature: Coalition
- Opposition party: Fianna Fáil
- Opposition leader: Bertie Ahern

History
- Incoming formation: 1994 Irish government crisis
- Legislature terms: 27th Dáil; 20th Seanad
- Predecessor: 23rd government
- Successor: 25th government

The 24th government of Ireland (15 December 1994 – 26 June 1997) was the government formed after the Labour Party had left its previous coalition with Fianna Fáil two years into the 27th Dáil. It was a coalition of Fine Gael, with leader John Bruton as Taoiseach, Labour, with Dick Spring as Tánaiste, and Democratic Left, led by Proinsias De Rossa, known as the Rainbow Coalition. It is the only time to date that a new government was formed within the same Dáil term composed of a different coalition of parties. The 24th government lasted 2 years, 193 days.

== Formation ==
The Labour Party had been part of the 23rd Government with Fianna Fáil, formed in January 1993 after the 1992 general election, but left in November 1994 following a number of scandals, particularly those which emerged from the Beef Tribunal and the alleged mishandling of the extradition of paedophile priest Brendan Smyth. After Albert Reynolds was replaced as Fianna Fáil leader by Bertie Ahern, there was speculation that Labour would rejoin Fianna Fáil in government, but instead it formed a government with two parties which had been in opposition. By-election gains since 1992 meant the three parties had enough TDs between them for an overall majority.

== Nomination of Taoiseach ==
In the Dáil debate on the nomination for Taoiseach, Fianna Fáil leader Bertie Ahern and Fine Gael leader John Bruton were proposed. Ahern was defeated by 67 votes to 94, while Bruton was approved. Bruton was appointed as Taoiseach by President Mary Robinson.

15 December 1994; Nomination of John Bruton (FG) as Taoiseach; Motion proposed by Nora Owen and seconded by Paddy Harte; Absolute majority: 84/166
Vote	Parties	Votes
Yes	Fine Gael (47), Labour Party (32), Democratic Left (6)	85 / 166
No	Fianna Fáil (65), Progressive Democrats (8), Independent (1)	74 / 166
Absent or Not voting	Independent (3), Ceann Comhairle (1), Fianna Fáil (1), Green Party (1), Independent Fianna Fáil (1)	7 / 166

== Government ministers ==
After his appointment as Taoiseach by the president, John Bruton proposed the members of the government and they were approved by the Dáil. They were appointed by the president on the same day.

Office	Name	Term	Party
Taoiseach	John Bruton (Note: Bruton served as Minister for Transport, Energy and Communications from 30 November to 3 December 1996 after the resignation of Lowry.)	1994–1997	Fine Gael
Tánaiste	Dick Spring	1994–1997	Labour
Minister for Foreign Affairs	Dick Spring	1994–1997	Labour
Minister for Finance	Ruairi Quinn	1994–1997	Labour
Minister for Health	Michael Noonan	1994–1997	Fine Gael
Minister for Equality and Law Reform	Mervyn Taylor	1994–1997	Labour
Minister for Arts, Culture and the Gaeltacht	Michael D. Higgins	1994–1997	Labour
Minister for the Environment	Brendan Howlin	1994–1997	Labour
Minister for Education	Niamh Bhreathnach	1994–1997	Labour
Minister for Justice	Nora Owen	1994–1997	Fine Gael
Minister for Social Welfare	Proinsias De Rossa	1994–1997	Democratic Left
Minister for Tourism and Trade	Enda Kenny	1994–1997	Fine Gael
Minister for Enterprise and Employment	Richard Bruton	1994–1997	Fine Gael
Minister for Agriculture, Food and Forestry	Ivan Yates	1994–1997	Fine Gael
Minister for Transport, Energy and Communications	Michael Lowry	1994–1996	Fine Gael
Minister for Defence	Hugh Coveney	1994–1995	Fine Gael
Minister for the Marine	Hugh Coveney	1994–1995	Fine Gael
=== Changes 23 May 1995 === Hugh Coveney was demoted to a Minister of State after allegations of improper contact with businessmen.
Minister for Defence	Seán Barrett	1995–1997	Fine Gael
Minister for the Marine	Seán Barrett	1995–1997	Fine Gael
=== Changes 3 December 1996 === Michael Lowry resigned following reports of improper payments from businessman Ben Dunne.
Minister for Transport, Energy and Communications	Alan Dukes	1996–1997	Fine Gael

== Attorney General ==
Dermot Gleeson SC was appointed by the president as Attorney General on the nomination of the Taoiseach.

== Ministers of state ==
=== Appointments 15 December 1994 === Seán Barrett, TD was appointed by the government as Minister for State at the Department of the Taoiseach with special responsibility as Government Chief Whip. Pat Rabbitte, TD was appointed as Minister of State to the Government. Both attended cabinet meetings without a vote.
Name	Department(s)	Responsibility	Party
Seán Barrett	Taoiseach; Defence	Government Chief Whip	Fine Gael
Pat Rabbitte	Minister of State to the Government; Enterprise and Employment	Commerce, science and technology and consumer affairs	Democratic Left
=== Appointments 20 December 1994 === Appointment by the government of 13 further Ministers of State on the nomination of the Taoiseach.
Name	Department(s)	Responsibility	Party
Emmet Stagg	Transport, Energy and Communications		Labour
Brian O'Shea	Health	Mental handicap, health promotion, food safety and public health	Labour
Eithne FitzGerald	Office of the Tánaiste; Enterprise and Employment	Labour affairs	Labour
Joan Burton	Foreign Affairs; Justice	Overseas development assistance	Labour
Toddy O'Sullivan	Tourism and Trade		Labour
Gay Mitchell	Taoiseach; Foreign Affairs	European affairs IFSC and local development initiatives	Fine Gael
Bernard Allen	Education; Environment	Youth and sport Local government reform	Fine Gael
Bernard Durkan	Social Welfare		Fine Gael
Jimmy Deenihan	Agriculture, Food and Forestry		Fine Gael
Phil Hogan	Finance		Fine Gael
Austin Currie	Health; Education; Justice	Children	Fine Gael
Eamon Gilmore	Marine		Democratic Left
Liz McManus	Environment		Democratic Left
=== Appointments 27 January 1995 === Following the increase in the number of Ministers of State permitted from 15 to 17 in the Ministers and Secretaries (Amendment) Act 1995.
Name	Department(s)	Responsibility	Party
Avril Doyle	Taoiseach; Finance; Transport, Energy and Communications	Consumers of Public Services	Fine Gael
Donal Carey	Taoiseach; Arts, Culture and the Gaeltacht	Western Development and Rural Renewal	Fine Gael
=== Change 10 February 1995 === Resignation of Phil Hogan after leaking details of the budget.
Name	Department(s)	Responsibility	Party
Jim Higgins	Finance	Public Expenditure; Office of Public Works	Fine Gael
=== Changes 24 May 1995 === Following the appointment of Seán Barrett to government.
Name	Department(s)	Responsibility	Party
Jim Higgins	Taoiseach; Defence	Government Chief Whip	Fine Gael
Hugh Coveney	Finance		Fine Gael

== Constitutional referendums ==
The Fifteenth Amendment was proposed by Minister for Equality and Law Reform Mervyn Taylor and approved in a referendum on 24 November 1995. It removed the prohibition on divorce, replacing it terms allowing a court to dissolve a marriage, including a requirement to have been separated for four of the previous five years. It was followed by Family Law (Divorce) Act 1996.

The Sixteenth Amendment was proposed by Minister for Justice Nora Owen and approved in a referendum on 28 November 1996. It allowed a court to refuse bail to someone convicted of a serious offence when reasonably considered necessary to prevent the commission of a serious offence by that person. It was followed by the Bail Act 1997.

== Confidence in the government ==
After the government had failed to properly effect the dismissal of Judge Dominic Lynch, a motion of no confidence was proposed in the government. This was debated on 12 and 13 November 1996 as a motion of confidence in the government, proposed by the Taoiseach. It was approved by a vote of 79 to 70.

== Dissolution ==
On 15 May 1997, the president dissolved the Dáil on the advice of the Taoiseach, and a general election was held on 6 June. When the 28th Dáil met on 26 June, Bertie Ahern was nominated and appointed as Taoiseach and formed a Fianna Fáil–Progressive Democrats coalition government.
