= Minister for Children, Disability and Equality =

Irish government cabinet minister

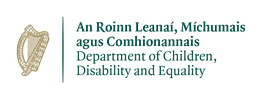

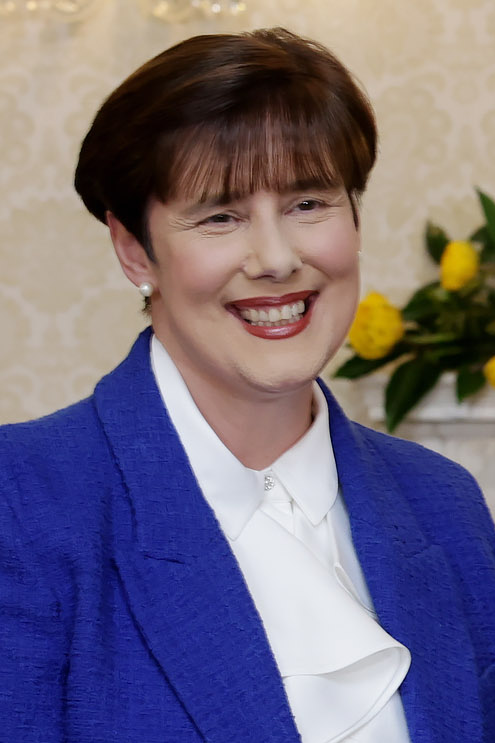
- Incumbent; Norma Foley since 23 January 2025
- Department of Children, Disability and Equality
- Status: Cabinet Minister
- Member of: government of Ireland; Council of the European Union; Dáil Éireann
- Reports to: Taoiseach
- Seat: Dublin, Ireland
- Nominator: Taoiseach
- Appointer: President of Ireland; (on the advice of the Taoiseach)
- Inaugural holder: Richard Mulcahy as Minister for the Gaeltacht
- Formation: 2 June 1956
- Salary: €210,750 (2025) (including €115,953 TD salary)
- Website: Official website

The minister for children, disability and equality (Irish: An tAire Leanaí, Míchumais agus Comhionannais) is a senior minister in the government of Ireland and leads the Department of Children, Disability and Equality.

The minister for children, disability and equality since January 2025 is Norma Foley, TD. She is assisted by a minister of state:

- Emer Higgins, TD – Minister of State at the Department of Children, Disability and Equality with responsibility for disability.

== Overview ==
The office was created in 1956 as the minister for the Gaeltacht. Its title and functions have changed several times, with the current title adopted in 2025. An office of minister of state for children existed from 2005 to 2011.

Responsibility for the Gaeltacht was transferred to the minister for arts, heritage and the Gaeltacht in 2011 and to the minister for rural and community development and the Gaeltacht in 2025.

Responsibility for Integration was transferred to the minister for justice, home affairs and migration in 2025.

== List of office-holders ==
=== Minister for the Gaeltacht 1956–1993 ===
Name	Term of office		Party	Government(s)
Richard Mulcahy	2 June 1956	24 October 1956	Fine Gael	7th
Patrick Lindsay	24 October 1956	20 March 1957	Fine Gael	7th
Jack Lynch	20 March 1957	26 June 1957	Fianna Fáil	8th
Mícheál Ó Móráin (1st time)	26 June 1957	23 July 1959	Fianna Fáil	8th • 9th
Gerald Bartley	23 July 1959	11 October 1961	Fianna Fáil	9th
Mícheál Ó Móráin (2nd time)	11 October 1961	26 March 1968	Fianna Fáil	10th • 11th • 12th
Pádraig Faulkner	27 March 1968	2 July 1969	Fianna Fáil	12th
George Colley	2 July 1969	14 March 1973	Fianna Fáil	13th
Tom O'Donnell	14 March 1973	5 July 1977	Fine Gael	14th
Denis Gallagher (1st time)	5 July 1977	11 December 1979	Fianna Fáil	15th
Máire Geoghegan-Quinn	12 December 1979	30 June 1981	Fianna Fáil	16th
Paddy O'Toole (1st time)	30 June 1981	9 March 1982	Fine Gael	17th
Pádraig Flynn	9 March 1982	11 October 1982	Fianna Fáil	18th
Denis Gallagher (2nd time)	11 October 1982	14 December 1982	Fianna Fáil	18th
Paddy O'Toole (2nd time)	14 December 1982	10 March 1987	Fine Gael	19th
Charles Haughey	10 March 1987	11 February 1992	Fianna Fáil	20th • 21st
John Wilson	11 February 1992	12 January 1993	Fianna Fáil	22nd
=== Minister for Arts, Culture and the Gaeltacht 1993–1997 ===
Name	Term of office		Party	Government(s)
Michael D. Higgins (1st time)	12 January 1993	17 November 1994	Labour	23rd
Bertie Ahern	18 November 1994	15 December 1994	Fianna Fáil	23rd
Michael D. Higgins (2nd time)	15 December 1994	26 June 1997	Labour	24th
=== Minister for Arts, Heritage, Gaeltacht and the Islands 1997–2002 ===
Name	Term of office		Party	Government(s)
Síle de Valera	26 June 1997	6 June 2002	Fianna Fáil	25th
=== Minister for Community, Rural and Gaeltacht Affairs 2002–2010 ===
Name	Term of office		Party	Government(s)
Éamon Ó Cuív	6 June 2002	23 March 2010	Fianna Fáil	26th • 27th • 28th
=== Minister for Community, Equality and Gaeltacht Affairs 2010–2011 ===
Name	Term of office		Party	Government(s)
Pat Carey	23 March 2010	9 March 2011	Fianna Fáil	28th
=== Minister for Children and Youth Affairs 2011–2020 ===
Name	Term of office		Party	Government(s)
Frances Fitzgerald	9 March 2011	7 May 2014	Fine Gael	29th
Charles Flanagan	8 May 2014	11 July 2014	Fine Gael	29th
James Reilly	11 July 2014	6 May 2016	Fine Gael	29th
Katherine Zappone	6 May 2016	27 June 2020	Independent	30th • 31st
=== Minister for Children, Equality, Disability, Integration and Youth 2020–2025 ===
Name	Term of office		Party	Government(s)
Roderic O'Gorman	27 June 2020	23 January 2025	Green	32nd • 33rd • 34th
=== Minister for Children, Disability and Equality 2025–present ===
Name	Term of office		Party	Government(s)
Norma Foley	23 January 2025	Incumbent	Fianna Fáil	35th
