= Minister for Foreign Affairs and Trade =

Irish government cabinet minister

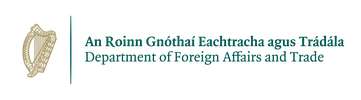

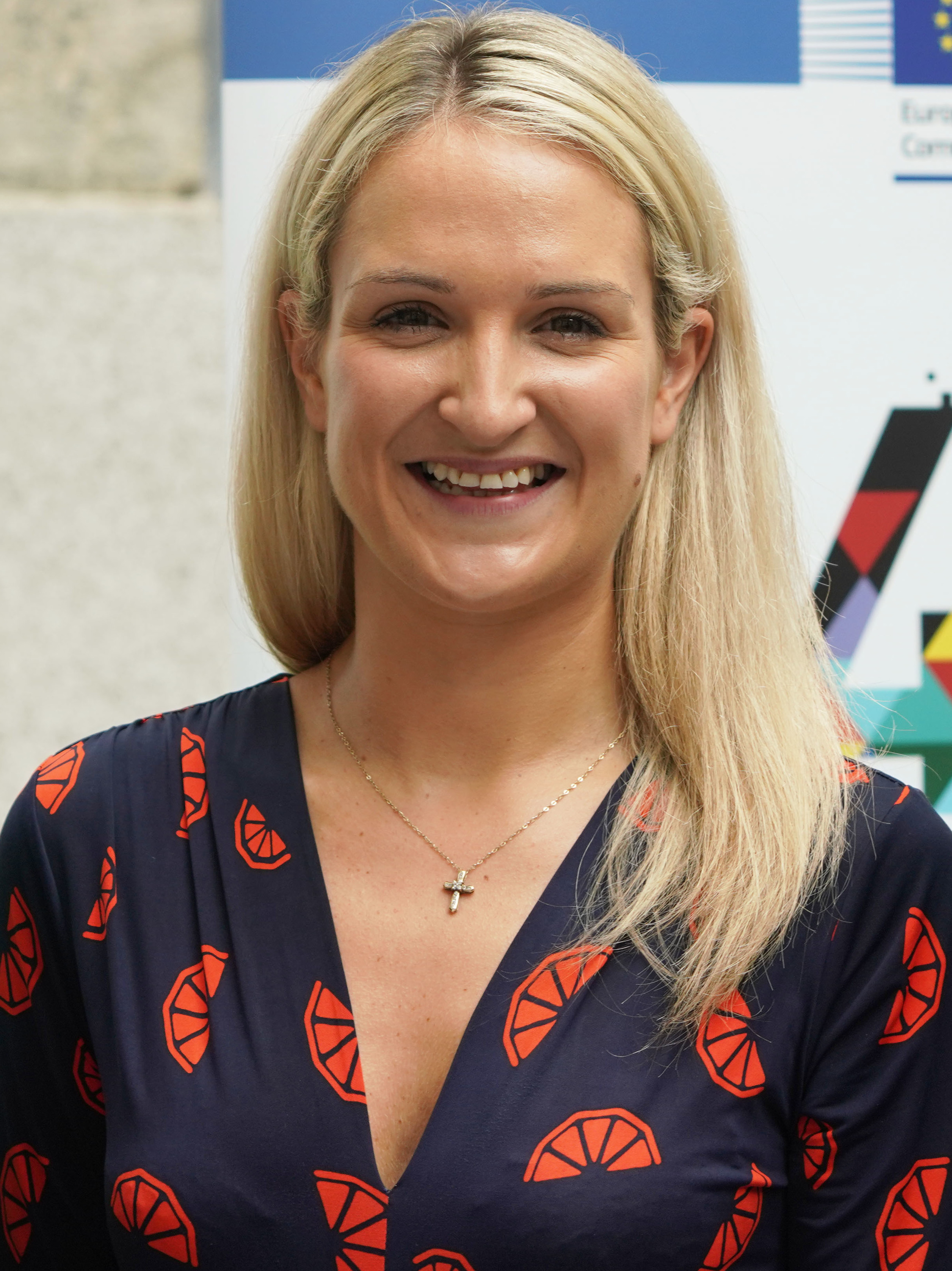
- Incumbent; Helen McEntee since 18 November 2025
- Department of Foreign Affairs and Trade
- Type: Foreign affairs minister; Trade minister
- Status: Cabinet minister
- Member of: Government of Ireland; Council of the European Union; Dáil Éireann
- Reports to: Taoiseach
- Seat: Iveagh House, Dublin, Ireland
- Nominator: Taoiseach
- Appointer: President of Ireland (on the advice of the Taoiseach)
- Inaugural holder: George Noble Plunkett
- Formation: 22 January 1919
- Salary: €210,750 (2025) (including €115,953 TD salary)
- Website: Official website

The minister for foreign affairs and trade (Irish: An tAire Gnóthaí Eachtracha agus Trádála) is a senior minister in the Government of Ireland and leads the Department of Foreign Affairs and Trade.

The minister's office is located at Iveagh House, on St Stephen's Green in Dublin; "Iveagh House" is often used as a metonym for the department as a whole. From 1922 until 1971, the title of the office was Minister for External Affairs.

The office holder since November 2025 is Helen McEntee, TD. She is also Minister for Defence.

She is assisted by:

- Thomas Byrne, TD – Minister of State for European Affairs
- Neale Richmond, TD – Minister of State for International Development and Diaspora

== Prominent ministers ==
Over the years a number of ministers have redefined Ireland's relationship with the United Kingdom and have allowed Ireland to join and take a prominent role in organisations such as the European Union and the United Nations. These include:

- Éamon de Valera – as the longest-serving minister for external affairs, de Valera served as President of the Council of the League of Nations, supported the admission of the Soviet Union, redefined Ireland's relationship with the United Kingdom and followed a policy of Irish neutrality during World War II.
- Seán MacBride – during MacBride's short tenure as Minister Ireland withdrew from the British Commonwealth, refused to join NATO and became a member of the Council of Europe.
- Frank Aiken – as another long-serving minister, Aiken adopted where possible an independent stance for Ireland at the United Nations and other international forums such as the Council of Europe. He introduced "Aiken Plan" to the UN in an effort to combine disarmament and peace in the Middle East and received the honour of being the first minister to sign the Treaty on the Non-Proliferation of Nuclear Weapons in 1968 in Moscow.
- Liam Cosgrave – Minister from 1954 until 1957, Cosgrave took part in trade discussions and chaired the Committee of Ministers of the Council of Europe in 1955. He also successfully presided over Ireland's admittance to the United Nations, defining Irish foreign policy for decades in his first address to the General Assembly in 1956.
- Patrick Hillery – during his four-year tenure Hillery negotiated Irish membership of the European Economic Community (EEC) and earned a high international profile when, in the aftermath of the killing of thirteen unarmed civilians in Derry by British Paratroopers (known as "Bloody Sunday"), he travelled to the United Nations in New York to demand UN involvement in peace-keeping on the streets of Northern Ireland.
- Garret FitzGerald – became Minister for Foreign Affairs in 1973, shortly after Ireland joined the European Economic Community (EEC), now known as the European Union (EU). With a background in economics and journalism, and as a politician of great intelligence and scope, his innovative views, energy and fluency in French ensured that Ireland's first Presidency of the European Council in the second half of 1975 was a success. He travelled extensively in his role as President of the General Affairs Council of the EEC. His tenure at the Department of Foreign Affairs helped him later to achieve the leadership of the party.

== List of officeholders ==
Denotes acting Minister

=== Minister for Foreign Affairs, 1919–1922 ===
Name	Term of office		Party	Government(s) (Note: Before 1937: DM – Dáil Ministry; PG – Provisional Government; EC – Executive Council.)
George Noble Plunkett	22 January 1919	26 August 1921	Sinn Féin	1st DM • 2nd DM
Arthur Griffith (Note: On the first occasion he held the foreign affairs portfolio, Arthur Griffith's title was Secretary of State for Foreign Affairs.) (1st time)	26 August 1921	9 January 1922	Sinn Féin	3rd DM
George Gavan Duffy	10 January 1922	25 July 1922	Sinn Féin (Pro-Treaty)	4th DM • 1st PG
Arthur Griffith (2nd time)	26 July 1922	12 August 1922	Sinn Féin (Pro-Treaty)	4th DM • 1st PG
Michael Hayes (acting)	21 August 1922	9 September 1922	Sinn Féin (Pro-Treaty)	4th DM • 1st PG
=== Minister for External Affairs, 1922–1971 ===
Name	Term of office		Party	Government(s)
Desmond FitzGerald	30 August 1922	23 June 1927	Cumann na nGaedheal	2nd PG • 5th DM • 1st EC • 2nd EC
Kevin O'Higgins	23 June 1927	10 July 1927	Cumann na nGaedheal	3rd EC
W. T. Cosgrave (acting)	10 July 1927	11 October 1927	Cumann na nGaedheal	3rd EC
Patrick McGilligan	11 October 1927	9 March 1932	Cumann na nGaedheal	4th EC • 5th EC
Éamon de Valera (Note: Éamon de Valera, who was head of government (President of the Executive Council until 1937, renamed Taoiseach in 1937) served as his own foreign minister.)	9 March 1932	18 February 1948	Fianna Fáil	6th EC • 7th EC • 8th EC • 1st • 2nd • 3rd • 4th
Seán MacBride	18 February 1948	v13 June 1951	Clann na Poblachta	5th
Frank Aiken (1st time)	13 June 1951	2 June 1954	Fianna Fáil	6th
Liam Cosgrave	2 June 1954	20 March 1957	Fine Gael	7th
Frank Aiken (2nd time)	20 March 1957	2 July 1969	Fianna Fáil	8th • 9th • 10th • 11th • 12th
Patrick Hillery	2 July 1969	3 March 1971	Fianna Fáil	13th
=== Minister for Foreign Affairs, 1971–2011 ===
Name	Term of office		Party	Government(s)
Patrick Hillery	3 March 1971	3 January 1973	Fianna Fáil	13th
Brian Lenihan (1st time)	3 January 1973	14 March 1973	Fianna Fáil	13th
Garret FitzGerald	14 March 1973	5 July 1977	Fine Gael	14th
Michael O'Kennedy	5 July 1977	11 December 1979	Fianna Fáil	15th
Brian Lenihan (2nd time)	12 December 1979	30 June 1981	Fianna Fáil	16th
John Kelly (acting) (Note: John Kelly, who was also Minister for Trade, Commerce and Tourism, was named as acting Minister for Foreign Affairs until Dooge was appointed to Seanad Éireann and later appointed as minister.)	30 June 1981	21 October 1981	Fine Gael	17th
James Dooge	21 October 1981	9 March 1982	Fine Gael	17th
Gerry Collins (1st time)	9 March 1982	14 December 1982	Fianna Fáil	18th
Peter Barry	14 December 1982	10 March 1987	Fine Gael	19th
Brian Lenihan (3rd time)	10 March 1987	12 July 1989	Fianna Fáil	20th
Gerry Collins (2nd time)	12 July 1989	11 February 1992	Fianna Fáil	21st
David Andrews (1st time)	11 February 1992	12 January 1993	Fianna Fáil	22nd
Dick Spring (1st time)	12 January 1993	17 November 1994	Labour	23rd
Albert Reynolds (acting)	18 November 1994	15 December 1994	Fianna Fáil	23rd
Dick Spring (2nd time)	15 December 1994	26 June 1997	Labour	24th
Ray Burke	26 June 1997	7 October 1997	Fianna Fáil	25th
David Andrews (2nd time)	8 October 1997	27 January 2000	Fianna Fáil	25th
Brian Cowen	27 January 2000	29 September 2004	Fianna Fáil	25th • 26th
Dermot Ahern	29 September 2004	7 May 2008	Fianna Fáil	26th • 27th
Micheál Martin	7 May 2008	19 January 2011	Fianna Fáil	28th
Brian Cowen (2nd time)	19 January 2011	9 March 2011	Fianna Fáil	28th
=== Minister for Foreign Affairs and Trade, 2011–2020 ===
Name	Term of office		Party	Government(s)
Eamon Gilmore	9 March 2011	11 July 2014	Labour	29th
Charles Flanagan	11 July 2014	14 June 2017	Fine Gael	29th • 30th
Simon Coveney	14 June 2017	27 June 2020	Fine Gael	31st
=== Minister for Foreign Affairs, 2020–2025 ===
Name	Term of office		Party	Government(s)
Simon Coveney (Note: Also Minister for Defence.)	27 June 2020	17 December 2022	Fine Gael	32nd
Micheál Martin (2nd time)	17 December 2022	23 January 2025	Fianna Fáil	33rd • 34th
=== Minister for Foreign Affairs and Trade, 2025–present ===
Name	Term of office		Party	Government(s)
Simon Harris	23 January 2025	18 November 2025	Fine Gael	35th
Helen McEntee	18 November 2025	Incumbent	Fine Gael	35th
