= Minister of state (Ireland) =

Non-cabinet rank minister in Ireland

In Ireland, a minister of state (Irish: Aire Stáit; often called a junior minister, aire sóisearach) is a minister of non-cabinet rank attached to one or more departments of state of the Government of Ireland and assists the minister of the government responsible for that department. The government may appoint up to 23 ministers of state.

== Appointment ==
Unlike senior government ministers, which are appointed by the president of Ireland on the advice of the Taoiseach and the prior approval of Dáil Éireann, ministers of state are appointed directly by the government, on the nomination of the Taoiseach. Members of either house of the Oireachtas (Dáil or Seanad) may be appointed to be a minister of state; to date, the only senator appointed as a minister of state has been Pippa Hackett, who served from June 2020 to January 2025. Ministers of state continue in office after the dissolution of the Dáil until the appointment of a new Taoiseach. If the Taoiseach resigns from office, a minister of state is also deemed to have resigned from office.

Powers and duties of a government minister may be delegated to a minister of state by a statutory instrument. If the government minister resigns, these powers must delegated again on the appointment of a new government minister. Some ministers of state are de facto department heads. In the 31st government, Leo Varadkar was the minister for defence as well as Taoiseach but the day-to-day running of the Department of Defence was administered by Paul Kehoe, the minister of state.

== History ==
The Ministers and Secretaries Act 1924 allowed the Executive Council (from 1937, the government of Ireland) to appoint up to seven parliamentary secretaries to the Executive Council or to Executive Ministers, who held office during the duration of the government and while they were a member of the Oireachtas. This position was abolished by the Ministers and Secretaries (Amendment) (No. 2) Act 1977, which created the new position of minister of state. This Act was commenced on 1 January 1978.

In the 1977 Act, the number of ministers of state was limited to 10. This limit was raised to 15 in 1980, to 17 in 1995, to 20 in 2007, and to 23 in 2025. On 21 April 2009, Brian Cowen asked all 20 ministers of state to resign, and he re-appointed a reduced number of 15 ministers the following day, when the Dáil resumed after the Easter recess. In July 2020, the new government appointed 20 ministers of state.

Máire Geoghegan-Quinn was the first woman to be appointed as a Parliamentary Secretary, when she was appointed as Parliamentary Secretary to the Minister for Industry and Commerce by Jack Lynch in 1977 (becoming Minister of State at the Department of Industry, Commerce and Energy in 1978). In 1979, Geoghegan-Quinn would become the first woman appointed to cabinet since 1921.

== Ministers of state attending cabinet ==
The government chief whip is Minister of State at the Department of the Taoiseach and attends cabinet. The chief whip since January 2025 is Mary Butler.

Since the Rainbow Coalition formed in 1994, several governments have appointed additional ministers of state who regularly attend meetings of the government but without a vote. Ministers of state attending cabinet, other than the Government Chief Whip, are often described as super junior ministers or super juniors. Up to four ministers of state attending cabinet may receive an allowance. Ministers of state attending cabinet in the 35th government of Ireland:

- Mary Butler – Minister of State at the Department of the Taoiseach (Government Chief Whip)
- Emer Higgins – Minister of State at the Department of Children, Disability and Equality
- Seán Canney – Minister of State at the Department of Transport
- Noel Grealish – Minister of State at the Department of Agriculture, Food, Fisheries and the Marine

== See also ==
- Junior Minister (Northern Ireland)
