= Leader of Fine Gael =

Leader of the Irish political party Fine Gael

- Incumbent; Simon Harris since 24 March 2024
- Inaugural holder: Eoin O'Duffy
- Formation: 8 September 1933
- Deputy: Helen McEntee
- Website: Simon Harris

The Leader of Fine Gael is the most senior politician within the Fine Gael political party in Ireland. The party leader is Simon Harris, who took up the role on 24 March 2024 after the resignation of Leo Varadkar.

The deputy leader of Fine Gael is Helen McEntee, whom Harris appointed on 19 October 2024 after her predecessor, Heather Humphreys, declared she would not contest the 2024 general election.

== Background ==
In September 1933, Cumann na nGaedheal, the National Centre Party and the National Guard (previously called the Army Comrades Association better known as the Blueshirts) merged to form Fine Gael – the United Ireland party. Eoin O'Duffy, leader of the National Guard, though not a member of the Oireachtas, became the first party leader, with former President of the Executive Council W. T. Cosgrave serving as parliamentary leader. The merger brought together two strands of Irish nationalism, namely the pro-treaty wing of revolutionary Sinn Féin and the old Home Rule party represented by James Dillon and the National Centre Party. In reality, the new party was a larger version of Cumann na nGaedheal, the party created in 1923 by the pro-Treaty leaders of the Irish Free State under W. T. Cosgrave.

Cosgrave retired as leader before the 1944 general election, and was succeeded by Richard Mulcahy. Mulcahy was then a member of the Seanad, so Tom O'Higgins acted as parliamentary party leader. After the 1948 general election the First Inter-Party Government was formed, but Clann na Poblachta (under former anti-Treaty IRA Chief of Staff Seán MacBride) was opposed to Mulcahy because of his role as Chief of Staff of the National Army in the execution of republicans during the Irish Civil War. Mulcahy stepped aside, former Attorney General John A. Costello becoming Taoiseach; Mulcahy served instead as Minister for Education. Between 1948 and 1959, Costello served as parliamentary party leader. Mulcahy retired as leader in 1959, and was replaced by James Dillon. After defeat in the 1965 general election, Dillon resigned and was replaced by Liam Cosgrave, son of W. T. Cosgrave. Liam Cosgrave served as Taoiseach from 1973 to 1977. Cosgrave resigned after the Fine Gael–Labour Party government lost power at the 1977 general election.

Garret FitzGerald succeeded him as leader, and served as Taoiseach from June 1981 to March 1982 and from December 1982 to March 1987. FitzGerald resigned in 1987 after losing that year's general election, and was replaced by Alan Dukes. After Fine Gael failure in the 1989 general election and the 1990 presidential election, Dukes was replaced by John Bruton in 1990. Following the collapse of the Fianna Fáil–Labour Party government in 1994, Bruton become Taoiseach serving from 1994 to 1997 in a Rainbow coalition with the Labour Party and Democratic Left. Bruton was deposed from the leadership in 2001, in favour of Michael Noonan; this was due in part to fears that Fine Gael would suffer severe losses at the 2002 general election. However, Noonan failed to live up to expectations, and the party suffered an even greater collapse than had been expected under Bruton. Having gone into the election expecting to increase its seat count from 54 to 60, it won only 31 seats. On the night of the election Noonan resigned as leader after just over a year in office, triggering the third leadership contest in the history of the party. Four candidates put their names forward for the leadership, with Enda Kenny emerging as the victor after a secret ballot.

Like other Irish political parties, the Leader of Fine Gael has the power to dismiss or appoint their Deputy and to dismiss or appoint parliamentary party members to frontbench positions. When Fine Gael is in opposition the Leader would usually act as the Leader of the Opposition, and chair the Opposition front bench. Conversely, when the party is in government, the Leader would usually become Taoiseach, with the power to nominate members of the cabinet.

During his leadership, Enda Kenny first served as Leader of the Opposition from 2002 until 2011. Fine Gael won a landslide victory in the 2011 general election as a result of Fianna Fáil's handling of the 2008 banking crisis. He was elected Taoiseach and went into coalition with the Labour Party. He led the party into the 2016 general election where Fine Gael lost seats but he was re-elected for a second term as Taoiseach, becoming the first Fine Gael leader to win a second consecutive term as Taoiseach. He led a Fine Gael minority government until he resigned as Taoiseach and Fine Gael leader in 2017. He was succeeded by Leo Varadkar as Leader of Fine Gael and as Taoiseach.

Varadkar became Leader of Fine Gael and Taoiseach in 2017 succeeding Enda Kenny upon his resignation. He led the Fine Gael minority government into the 2020 general election where his party came third to Fianna Fáil and Sinn Féin. Fine Gael entered into a three party coalition government with their traditional rival, Fianna Fáil and the Green Party. He served as Tánaiste until 17 December 2022, where the positions of Taoiseach and Tánaiste rotated as part of an agreed cabinet reshuffle where he began his second term as Taoiseach while Martin succeeded him as Tánaiste.

== Leaders ==
No.	Name	Portrait	Constituency	Term of Office		Taoiseach (Note: The office of head of government was the President of the Executive Council from 1922 to 1937.)
1	Eoin O'Duffy		None (Note: O'Duffy did not hold a seat in the Oireachtas while he was party leader.)	1933	1934	Éamon de Valera (1932–1948)
2	W. T. Cosgrave		Carlow–Kilkenny (until 1927); Cork Borough (from 1927)	1934	1944	Éamon de Valera (1932–1948)
3	Richard Mulcahy (Note: While Mulcahy was a member of the Seanad in 1944, Tom O'Higgins acted as parliamentary party leader.) (Note: Between 1948 and 1959, John A. Costello served as parliamentary party leader.)		Tipperary	1944	1959	Éamon de Valera (1932–1948)
3	Richard Mulcahy		Tipperary	1944	1959	John A. Costello (1948–1951) (Note: Clann na Poblachta (under former anti-Treaty IRA Chief of Staff Seán MacBride) were opposed to Mulcahy because of his role as Chief of Staff of the Irish Army in the execution of republicans during the Irish Civil War. Former Attorney General John A. Costello was chosen to head the government.)
3	Richard Mulcahy		Tipperary	1944	1959	Éamon de Valera (1951–1954)
3	Richard Mulcahy		Tipperary	1944	1959	John A. Costello (1954–1957)
3	Richard Mulcahy		Tipperary	1944	1959	Éamon de Valera (1957–1959)
4	James Dillon		Monaghan	1959	1965	Seán Lemass (1959–1966)
5	Liam Cosgrave		Dún Laoghaire and Rathdown	1965	1977	Jack Lynch (1966–1973)
5	Liam Cosgrave		Dún Laoghaire and Rathdown	1965	1977	Liam Cosgrave (1973–1977)
6	Garret FitzGerald		Dublin South-East	1977	1987	Jack Lynch (1977–1979)
6	Garret FitzGerald		Dublin South-East	1977	1987	Charles Haughey (1979–1981)
6	Garret FitzGerald		Dublin South-East	1977	1987	Garret FitzGerald (1981–1982)
6	Garret FitzGerald		Dublin South-East	1977	1987	Charles Haughey (1982)
6	Garret FitzGerald		Dublin South-East	1977	1987	Garret FitzGerald (1982–1987)
7	Alan Dukes		Kildare	1987	1990	Charles Haughey (1987–1992)
8	John Bruton		Meath	1990	2001	Charles Haughey (1987–1992)
8	John Bruton		Meath	1990	2001	Albert Reynolds (1992–1994)
8	John Bruton		Meath	1990	2001	John Bruton (1994–1997)
8	John Bruton		Meath	1990	2001	Bertie Ahern (1997–2008)
9	Michael Noonan		Limerick East	2001	2002	Bertie Ahern (1997–2008)
10	Enda Kenny		Mayo	2002	2017	Bertie Ahern (1997–2008)
10	Enda Kenny		Mayo	2002	2017	Brian Cowen (2008–2011)
10	Enda Kenny		Mayo	2002	2017	Enda Kenny (2011–2017)
11	Leo Varadkar		Dublin West	2017	2024	Leo Varadkar (2017–2020)
11	Leo Varadkar		Dublin West	2017	2024	Micheál Martin (2020–2022)
11	Leo Varadkar		Dublin West	2017	2024	Leo Varadkar (2022–2024)
12	Simon Harris		Wicklow	2024	Incumbent	Simon Harris (2024–2025)
12	Simon Harris		Wicklow	2024	Incumbent	Micheál Martin (2025–present)

== Deputy leaders ==
The Deputy leader of Fine Gael is a senior politician within the Fine Gael political party in Ireland. The post is currently held by Helen McEntee, who was appointed deputy on 19 October 2024.

Like other political party leaders, the leader of Fine Gael has the power to appoint or dismiss their deputy. The position is not an elected one and is largely honorific.

Name	Portrait	Constituency	Term of Office		Office(s) held
Tom O'Higgins		Dublin County South	20 April 1972	14 September 1977	
Peter Barry		Cork South-Central	14 September 1977	26 March 1987	Minister for the Environment; Minister for Foreign Affairs; Tánaiste
John Bruton		Meath	26 March 1987	20 November 1990	
Peter Barry		Cork South-Central	14 January 1991	5 February 1993	
Nora Owen		Dublin North	3 March 1993	9 February 2001	Minister for Justice
Jim Mitchell		Dublin Central	9 February 2001	17 May 2002	
Richard Bruton		Dublin North-Central	12 June 2002	14 June 2010	
James Reilly		Dublin North	1 July 2010	16 May 2017	Minister for Health; Minister for Children and Youth Affairs
Simon Coveney		Cork South-Central	13 June 2017	5 April 2024	Minister for Housing, Planning, Community and Local Government; Minister for Foreign Affairs; Tánaiste; Minister for Defence; Minister for Enterprise, Trade and Employment
Heather Humphreys		Cavan–Monaghan	5 April 2024	19 October 2024	Minister for Rural and Community Development; Minister for Social Protection
Helen McEntee		Meath East	19 October 2024	Incumbent	Minister for Justice; Minister for Education and Youth; Minister for Foreign Affairs and Trade; Minister for Defence

== See also ==
- Leader of Fianna Fáil
- Leader of the Labour Party (Ireland)
- Leader of Sinn Féin
