= 1990 Fine Gael leadership election =

Irish political party leadership contest

| ← 1987 | 13–21 November 1990 | 2001 → |
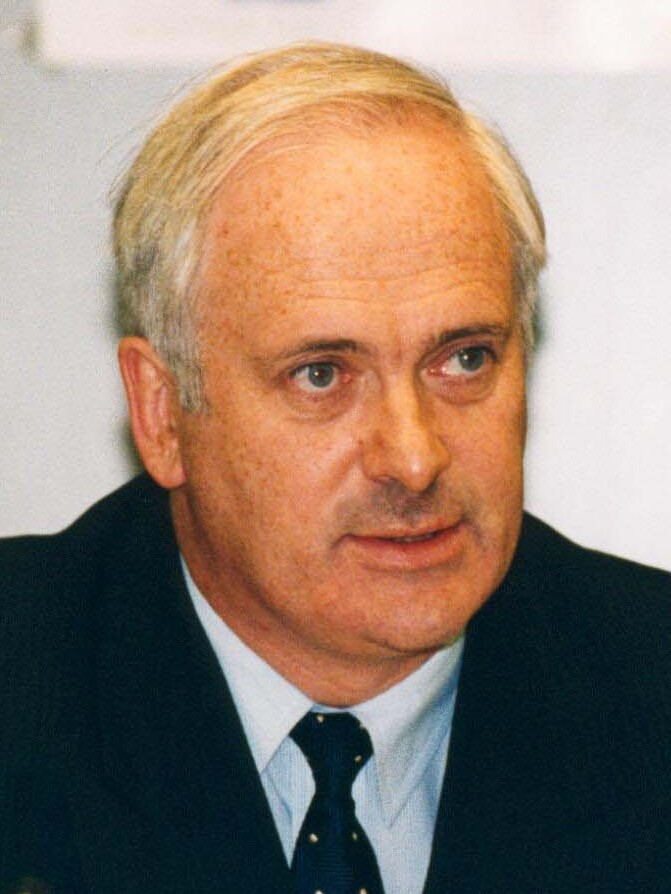
| Candidate | John Bruton |
| Popular vote | Unopposed |
Leader before election
Alan Dukes
Elected Leader
John Bruton

The Fine Gael leadership election of November 1990 was held to find a successor to Alan Dukes who resigned following a collapse in the party's support and the poor showing of the Fine Gael candidate, Austin Currie, in the presidential election.

Dukes, who had been elected leader in 1987, faced a motion of no confidence in his leadership as unrest grew about the poor standing of the party. Rather than face the parliamentary party and almost certain defeat, Dukes resigned on 13 November and triggered the leadership contest. John Bruton, who was defeated by Dukes for the leadership in 1987 and had been deputy-leader since then, took over as acting party leader.

A number of candidates immediately emerged for the party leadership. Bruton was the first to throw his hat in the ring and was installed as the 'hot favourite' to win the contest. Ivan Yates, one of the younger members of the party and front bench spokesperson on health, also launched a leadership campaign based on policy direction and party strategy. Other TDs who considered running included Michael Noonan and Gay Mitchell.

On 15 November Noonan and Mitchell announced that they would not be putting their names forward for the leadership and would be supporting Bruton. Yates, the only other TD to officially announce his candidacy, also withdrew after pressure by senior figures in the party who, in the interest of party unity, believed that Bruton should be elected leader unopposed.

On 20 November John Bruton was elected unopposed as leader of Fine Gael.
