= Fine Gael leadership election =

Fine Gael leadership election may refer to:

- 1987 Fine Gael leadership election
- 1990 Fine Gael leadership election
- 2001 Fine Gael leadership election
- 2002 Fine Gael leadership election
- 2017 Fine Gael leadership election
