= Austin Deasy =

Irish politician (1936–2017)

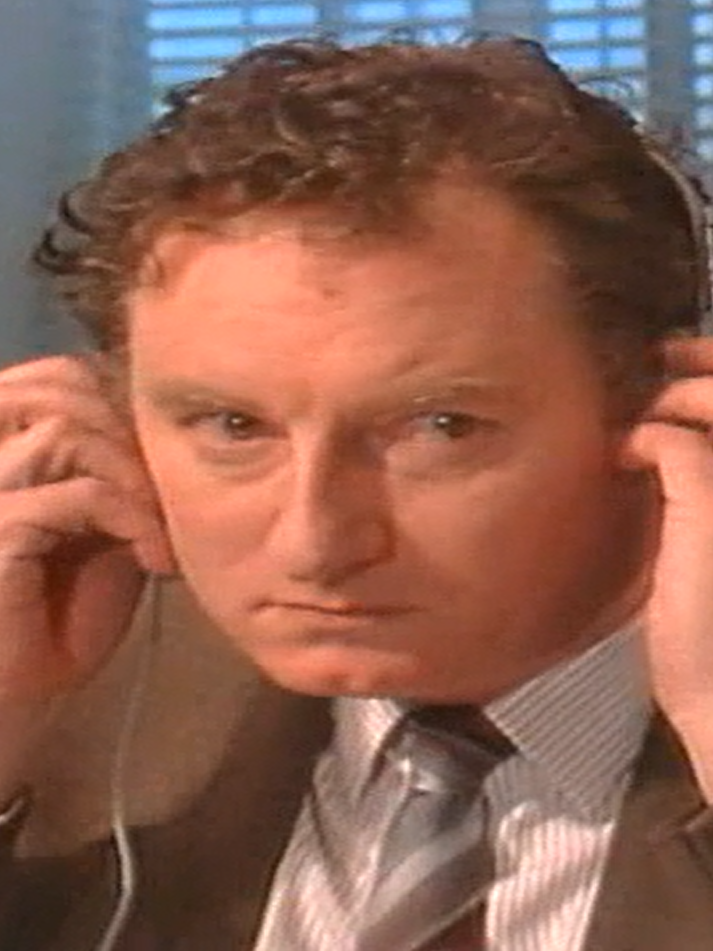
- Deasy in 1984

Minister for Agriculture
- In office 14 December 1982 – 10 March 1987
- Taoiseach: Garret FitzGerald
- Preceded by: Brian Lenihan
- Succeeded by: Michael O'Kennedy

Teachta Dála
- In office June 1977 – May 2002
- Constituency: Waterford

Senator
- In office 1 June 1973 – 16 June 1977
- Constituency: Nominated by the Taoiseach

Personal details
- Born: Martin Austin Deasy; 26 August 1936 Dungarvan, County Waterford, Ireland
- Died: 10 June 2017 (aged 80) Waterford, Ireland
- Party: Fine Gael
- Spouse: Kathleen Keating (m. 1961)
- Children: 4, including John
- Relatives: Maura Derrane (daughter-in-law)
- Education: University College Cork

Martin Austin Deasy (26 August 1936 – 10 June 2017) was an Irish Fine Gael politician who served as Minister for Agriculture from 1982 to 1987. He served as a Teachta Dála (TD) for the Waterford constituency from 1977 to 2002. He was a Senator from 1973 to 1977, after being nominated by the Taoiseach.

== Early life ==
Deasy was born in Dungarvan, County Waterford in August 1936. He was educated at Dungarvan CBS, before studying at University College Cork. He qualified as a secondary school teacher in 1963. Immediately after graduating, Deasy joined the teaching staff of St. Augustine's College in Dungarvan.

== Political career ==
=== Early career ===
Deasy was elected as a Fine Gael member of both Dungarvan Urban District Council and Waterford County Council in 1967, positions he held until 1983. He was chairman of the latter body from 1980 to 1981, before reclaiming his seat on the Urban District Council from 1994 to 1999. Deasy was also a member of the South East Health Board, Waterford Harbour Commissioners and Waterford Vocational Education Committee.

He contested the 1969 general election, as a Fine Gael candidate for Waterford. However, he finished fifth in the three-seat constituency. Deasy finished in fifth position again when he stood as a candidate in the same constituency at the 1973 general election.

Deasy was selected as a candidate for the Cultural and Educational Panel for the subsequent election to Seanad Éireann in 1973. However, he was once again unsuccessful. In spite of this, he was appointed to the Seanad as one of Taoiseach Liam Cosgrave's nominees.

=== TD ===
Deasy contested his third general election in 1977. He was successful in being elected that time, taking the third seat in the newly expanded constituency and finishing ahead of his running mate Edward Collins. Fine Gael returned to opposition following that election, however, Deasy was immediately appointed to the Front Bench as Spokesperson for Fisheries. In a 1979 reshuffle, he became Spokesperson for Transport, Communications and Technology, a position he held until early 1981, when he ceded the Communications and Technology elements of his brief.

Following the formation of a Fine Gael-Labour coalition government in 1981, Deasy was one of several Front Bench spokespersons who were unlucky not to be appointed to cabinet or as a Minister of State.

The collapse of the coalition government in 1982, saw Deasy return to Garret FitzGerald's Front Bench as Spokesperson on Foreign Affairs.

The formation of a new Fine Gael-Labour coalition in 1982, saw Deasy being appointed as Minister for Agriculture. During his four-year tenure in the position he was seen as an effective Minister.

In 1988, Deasy resigned from the Fine Gael Party, in protest against Alan Dukes' Tallaght Strategy, in which Fine Gael would support the minority Fianna Fáil government on budgetary related issues. The following year Deasy tried unsuccessfully to remove Dukes as leader. Deasy called the agreement treacherous and said he could support any party who expressed confidence in Fianna Fáil or Charles Haughey. This was widely seen as the actual opinion of a majority of Fine Gael TD's and Senators. When the agreement had broken between Fine Gael and Fianna Fáil, Deasy agreed to return to Fine Gael. Upon his return in 1991, he was appointed to the front bench, after John Bruton became leader. Deasy later resigned again due to the financial difficulties the party was facing. In 2000, Deasy introduced an unsuccessful motion of no confidence in Bruton.

Deasy was succeeded as TD by his son, John Deasy.

== Personal life and death ==
In 1961 Deasy married Kathleen Keating, and they had four children. After a short illness, Deasy died at University Hospital Waterford on 10 June 2017, at the age of 80.

== See also ==
- Families in the Oireachtas

Political offices
Preceded by Brian Lenihan	Minister for Agriculture; 1982–1987	Succeeded by Michael O'Kennedy

Dáil	Election	Deputy (Party)	Deputy (Party)	Deputy (Party)	Deputy (Party)
4th	1923	Caitlín Brugha (Rep)	John Butler (Lab)	Nicholas Wall (FP)	William Redmond (NL)
5th	1927 (Jun)	Caitlín Brugha (Rep)	Patrick Little (FF)	Vincent White (CnaG)	William Redmond (NL)
6th	1927 (Sep)	Seán Goulding (FF)	Patrick Little (FF)	Vincent White (CnaG)	William Redmond (NL)
7th	1932	Seán Goulding (FF)	Patrick Little (FF)	John Kiersey (CnaG)	William Redmond (CnaG)
8th	1933	Seán Goulding (FF)	Patrick Little (FF)	Nicholas Wall (NCP)	Bridget Redmond (CnaG)
9th	1937	Michael Morrissey (FF)	Patrick Little (FF)	Nicholas Wall (FG)	Bridget Redmond (FG)
10th	1938	Michael Morrissey (FF)	Patrick Little (FF)	William Broderick (FG)	Bridget Redmond (FG)
11th	1943	Michael Morrissey (FF)	Patrick Little (FF)	Denis Heskin (CnaT)	Bridget Redmond (FG)
12th	1944	Michael Morrissey (FF)	Patrick Little (FF)	Denis Heskin (CnaT)	Bridget Redmond (FG)
12th	1947 by-election	John Ormonde (FF)	Patrick Little (FF)	Denis Heskin (CnaT)	Bridget Redmond (FG)
13th	1948	John Ormonde (FF)	Patrick Little (FF)	Thomas Kyne (Lab)	Bridget Redmond (FG)
14th	1951	John Ormonde (FF)	Patrick Little (FF)	Thomas Kyne (Lab)	Bridget Redmond (FG)
14th	1952 by-election	John Ormonde (FF)	Patrick Little (FF)	Thomas Kyne (Lab)	William Kenneally (FF)
15th	1954	John Ormonde (FF)	Thaddeus Lynch (FG)	Thomas Kyne (Lab)	William Kenneally (FF)
16th	1957	John Ormonde (FF)	Thaddeus Lynch (FG)	Thomas Kyne (Lab)	William Kenneally (FF)
17th	1961	John Ormonde (FF)	Thaddeus Lynch (FG)	Thomas Kyne (Lab)	3 seats 1961–1977
18th	1965	Billy Kenneally (FF)	Thaddeus Lynch (FG)	Thomas Kyne (Lab)	3 seats 1961–1977
18th	1966 by-election	Billy Kenneally (FF)	Fad Browne (FF)	Thomas Kyne (Lab)	3 seats 1961–1977
19th	1969	Billy Kenneally (FF)	Fad Browne (FF)	Edward Collins (FG)	3 seats 1961–1977
20th	1973	Billy Kenneally (FF)	Thomas Kyne (Lab)	Edward Collins (FG)	3 seats 1961–1977
21st	1977	Billy Kenneally (FF)	Jackie Fahey (FF)	Edward Collins (FG)	Austin Deasy (FG)
22nd	1981	Billy Kenneally (FF)	Jackie Fahey (FF)	Edward Collins (FG)	Austin Deasy (FG)
23rd	1982 (Feb)	Paddy Gallagher (SF–WP)	Jackie Fahey (FF)	Edward Collins (FG)	Austin Deasy (FG)
24th	1982 (Nov)	Donal Ormonde (FF)	Jackie Fahey (FF)	Edward Collins (FG)	Austin Deasy (FG)
25th	1987	Martin Cullen (PDs)	Jackie Fahey (FF)	Brian Swift (FF)	Austin Deasy (FG)
26th	1989	Brian O'Shea (Lab)	Jackie Fahey (FF)	Brendan Kenneally (FF)	Austin Deasy (FG)
27th	1992	Brian O'Shea (Lab)	Martin Cullen (PDs)	Brendan Kenneally (FF)	Austin Deasy (FG)
28th	1997	Brian O'Shea (Lab)	Martin Cullen (FF)	Brendan Kenneally (FF)	Austin Deasy (FG)
29th	2002	Brian O'Shea (Lab)	Martin Cullen (FF)	Ollie Wilkinson (FF)	John Deasy (FG)
30th	2007	Brian O'Shea (Lab)	Martin Cullen (FF)	Brendan Kenneally (FF)	John Deasy (FG)
31st	2011	Ciara Conway (Lab)	John Halligan (Ind.)	Paudie Coffey (FG)	John Deasy (FG)
32nd	2016	David Cullinane (SF)	John Halligan (Ind.)	Mary Butler (FF)	John Deasy (FG)
33rd	2020	David Cullinane (SF)	Marc Ó Cathasaigh (GP)	Mary Butler (FF)	Matt Shanahan (Ind.)
34th	2024	David Cullinane (SF)	Conor D. McGuinness (SF)	Mary Butler (FF)	John Cummins (FG)
