= 1987 Fine Gael leadership election =

Irish political party leadership contest

- 11–21 March 1987
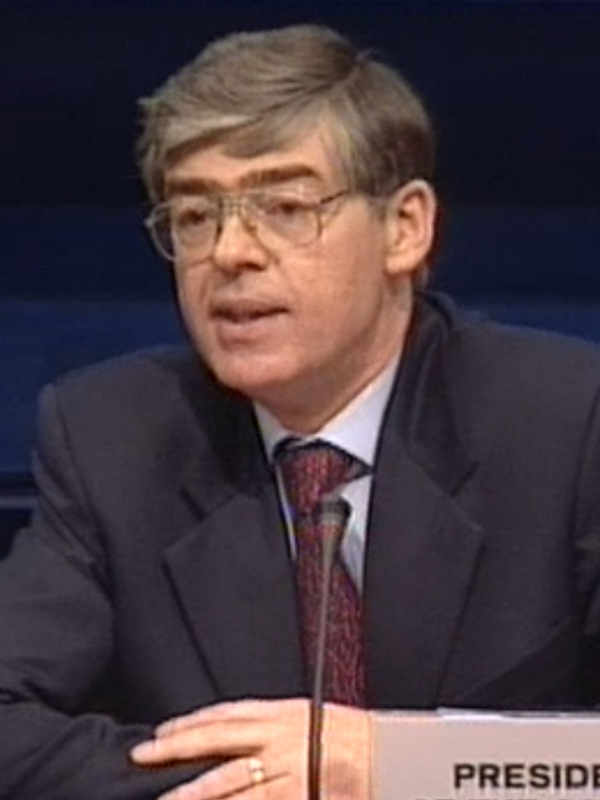

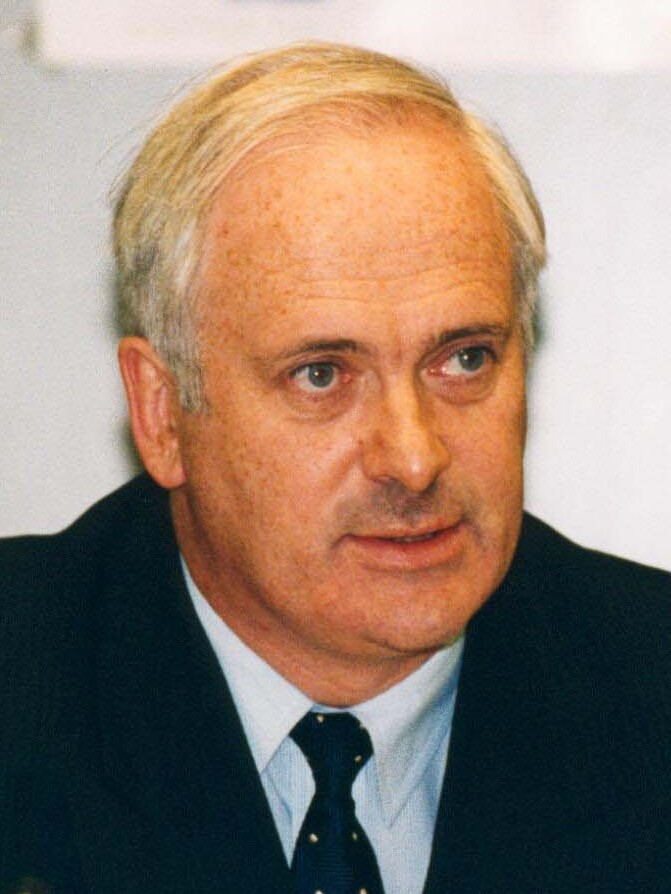

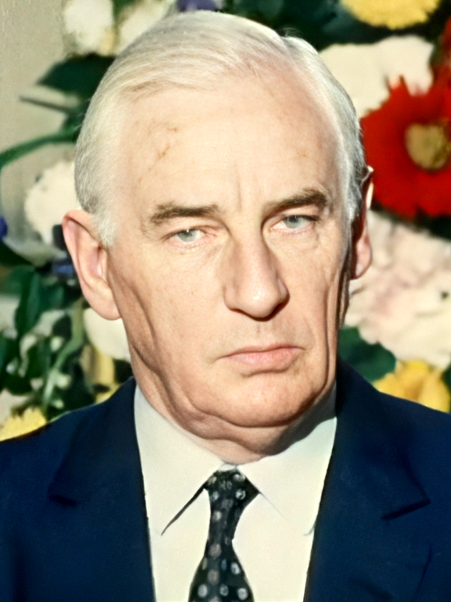
Candidate	Alan Dukes	John Bruton	Peter Barry
Percentage	1st	2nd	3rd
Leader before election
Garret FitzGerald
Elected Leader
Alan Dukes

The Fine Gael leadership election of March 1987 was held to find a successor to Garret FitzGerald who resigned following the party's defeat in that year's general election.

It was the first time that a formal election by the parliamentary party had taken place, previous leaders having emerged through a consultation process and were then elected unopposed. This procedure was not used in 1987 as a number of eligible candidates emerged.

Three candidates immediately emerged for the party leadership – Alan Dukes, former Minister for Justice; John Bruton, former Minister for Finance and the Public Service; and Michael Noonan, former Minister for Industry and Commerce. An early unofficial ranking of candidates had put Dukes slightly ahead with Noonan trailing in a distant third. Peter Barry, the deputy leader of the party, refused to announce his candidacy immediately, however, he eventually entered the leadership race as Michael Noonan refused to go stand due to a lack of support.

82 TDs, Senators and MEPs from the Fine Gael parliamentary party were entitled to cast their vote. The rules in place required the victor to reach 42 votes (half the total vote plus one). The results were not made public after the election.

On 21 March Alan Dukes was elected leader of Fine Gael by a significant majority. John Bruton, who would eventually success Dukes as leader, was said to have come second with Peter Barry trailing in third.
