= Leader of the Opposition (Ireland) =

Unofficial position in Dáil Éireann

Leader of the Opposition of Dáil Éireann
- Ceannaire an Fhreasúra
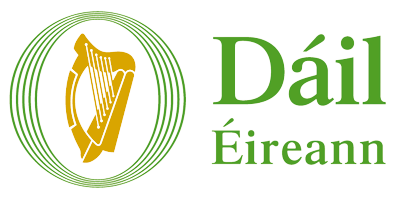

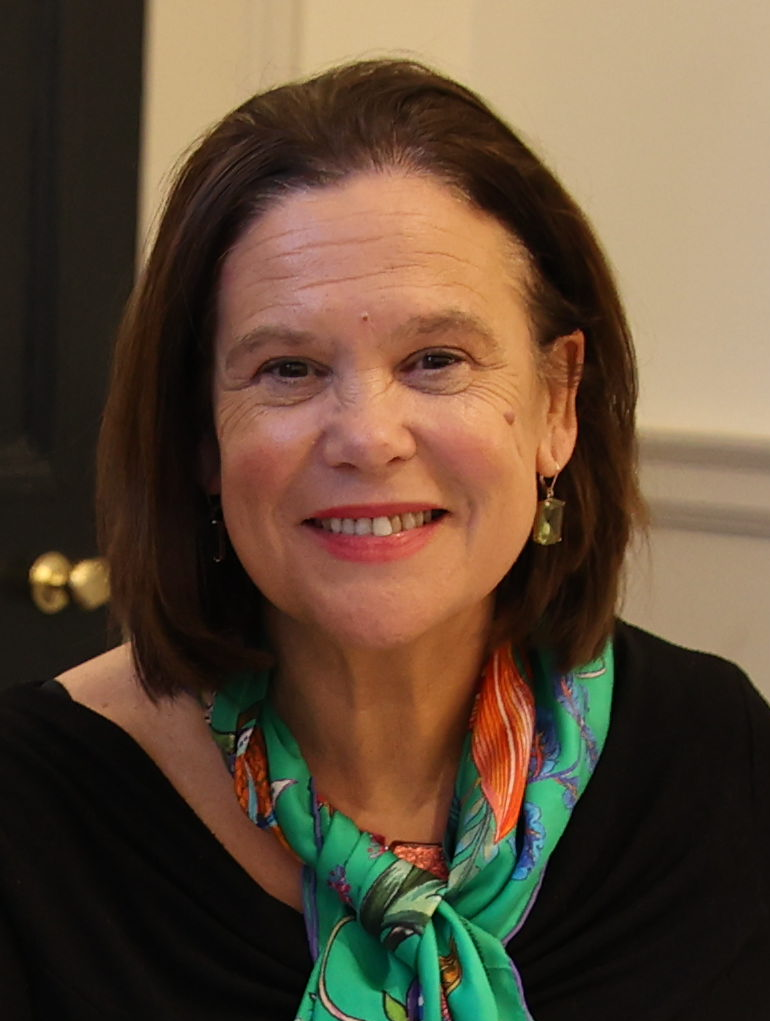
- Incumbent; Mary Lou McDonald since 27 June 2020
- Oireachtas Éireann; Opposition Front Bench
- Style: Deputy (Irish: An Teachta)
- Member of: Dáil Éireann; Sinn Féin Front Bench
- Reports to: Ceann Comhairle; Leas-Cheann Comhairle
- Term length: 5 years
- Inaugural holder: Thomas Johnson
- Formation: 6 December 1922
- Salary: €115,953 annually (plus expenses)

The leader of the opposition (Irish: Ceannaire an Fhreasúra) in Ireland is a de facto term sometimes used to describe the politician who leads the largest party in the parliamentary opposition in Dáil Éireann, the house of representatives of the Oireachtas (the Irish parliament). In the Dáil, the leader of the opposition sits on the right-hand side of the Ceann Comhairle and directly opposite the Taoiseach. The role is not an official one and is not recognised in the Irish constitution, nor in legislation.

The leader of the opposition is, by convention, the leader of the largest political party in the Dáil that is not in government. Opposition leaders leading a political party with five members or more have full speaking rights under Dáil standing orders; smaller parties and independent politicians are allowed to speak less often.

Historically the two largest parties have nearly always been Fianna Fáil and Fine Gael, and so the position of leader of the opposition has alternated between them. However, immediately following Irish independence from the UK in 1922, the leader of the Labour Party acted as leader of the opposition as Sinn Féin, and later Fianna Fáil, refused to take their seats in Dáil Éireann. After the 2011 general election Fine Gael became the largest party in Dáil Éireann and the Labour Party for the first time became the second largest. However, since Labour and Fine Gael entered a coalition government, the third largest party, Fianna Fáil, led the opposition in the 31st Dáil.

To date there have been 18 Opposition Leaders, 10 of whom have served terms as Taoiseach. The leader of the opposition as of 2025 is Mary Lou McDonald of Sinn Féin, following the formation of a government of Fianna Fáil, Fine Gael and the Green Party on 27 June 2020. She is the first female Irish opposition leader and the second to come from a party other than Fianna Fáil or Fine Gael, following Labour Party's Thomas Johnson in 1927.

== Leaders of the opposition ==
- Leaders who later became Taoiseach are indicated in bold.

| Name (Birth–Death) | Portrait | Constituency | Term of office | | Party | Taoiseach (Note: President of the Executive Council to 29 December 1937.) |
| Name (Birth–Death) | Portrait | Constituency | From | To | Party | Taoiseach |
|---|---|---|---|---|---|---|
| Thomas Johnson (1872–1963) | | Dublin County | 6 December 1922 | 11 August 1927 | Labour Party | W. T. Cosgrave (1922–1932) |
| **Éamon de Valera** (1882–1975) | | Clare | 11 August 1927 | 9 March 1932 | Fianna Fáil | W. T. Cosgrave (1922–1932) |
| W. T. Cosgrave (1880–1965) | | Cork Borough | 9 March 1932 | 11 January 1944 | Cumann na nGaedheal | Éamon de Valera (1932–1948) |
| W. T. Cosgrave (1880–1965) | | Cork Borough | 9 March 1932 | 11 January 1944 | Fine Gael | Éamon de Valera (1932–1948) |
| Thomas F. O'Higgins (1890–1953) | | Leix–Offaly | 11 January 1944 | 9 June 1944 | Fine Gael | Éamon de Valera (1932–1948) |
| Richard Mulcahy (1886–1971) | | Tipperary | 9 June 1944 | 18 February 1948 | Fine Gael | Éamon de Valera (1932–1948) |
| **Éamon de Valera** (1882–1975) | | Clare | 18 February 1948 | 13 June 1951 | Fianna Fáil | John A. Costello (1948–1951) |
| **John A. Costello** (1891–1976) | | Dublin South-East | 13 June 1951 | 2 June 1954 | Fine Gael | Éamon de Valera (1951–1954) |
| **Éamon de Valera** (1882–1975) | | Clare | 2 June 1954 | 20 March 1957 | Fianna Fáil | John A. Costello (1954–1957) |
| John A. Costello (1891–1976) | | Dublin South-East | 20 March 1957 | 21 October 1959 | Fine Gael | Éamon de Valera (1957–1959) |
| John A. Costello (1891–1976) | | Dublin South-East | 20 March 1957 | 21 October 1959 | Fine Gael | Seán Lemass (1959–1966) |
| James Dillon (1902–1986) | | Monaghan | 21 October 1959 | 21 April 1965 | Fine Gael | Seán Lemass (1959–1966) |
| **Liam Cosgrave** (1920–2017) | | Dún Laoghaire and Rathdown | 21 April 1965 | 14 March 1973 | Fine Gael | Seán Lemass (1959–1966) |
| **Liam Cosgrave** (1920–2017) | | Dún Laoghaire and Rathdown | 21 April 1965 | 14 March 1973 | Fine Gael | Jack Lynch (1966–1973) |
| **Jack Lynch** (1917–1999) | | Cork City North-West | 14 March 1973 | 5 July 1977 | Fianna Fáil | Liam Cosgrave (1973–1977) |
| **Garret FitzGerald** (1926–2011) | | Dublin South-East | 5 July 1977 | 30 June 1981 | Fine Gael | Jack Lynch (1977–1979) |
| **Garret FitzGerald** (1926–2011) | | Dublin South-East | 5 July 1977 | 30 June 1981 | Fine Gael | Charles Haughey (1979–1981) |
| **Charles Haughey** (1925–2006) | | Dublin North-Central | 30 June 1981 | 9 March 1982 | Fianna Fáil | Garret FitzGerald (1981–1982) |
| **Garret FitzGerald** (1926–2011) | | Dublin South-East | 9 March 1982 | 14 December 1982 | Fine Gael | Charles Haughey (1982) |
| **Charles Haughey** (1925–2006) | | Dublin North-Central | 14 December 1982 | 10 March 1987 | Fianna Fáil | Garret FitzGerald (1982–1987) |
| Alan Dukes (born 1945) | | Kildare | 10 March 1987 | 20 November 1990 | Fine Gael | Charles Haughey (1987–1992) |
| **John Bruton** (1947–2024) | | Meath | 20 November 1990 | 15 December 1994 | Fine Gael | Charles Haughey (1987–1992) |
| **John Bruton** (1947–2024) | | Meath | 20 November 1990 | 15 December 1994 | Fine Gael | Albert Reynolds (1992–1994) |
| **Bertie Ahern** (born 1951) | | Dublin Central | 15 December 1994 | 26 June 1997 | Fianna Fáil | John Bruton (1994–1997) |
| John Bruton (1947–2024) | | Meath | 26 June 1997 | 9 February 2001 | Fine Gael | Bertie Ahern (1997–2008) |
| Michael Noonan (born 1943) | | Limerick East | 9 February 2001 | 6 June 2002 | Fine Gael | Bertie Ahern (1997–2008) |
| **Enda Kenny** (born 1951) | | Mayo | 6 June 2002 | 9 March 2011 | Fine Gael | Bertie Ahern (1997–2008) |
| **Enda Kenny** (born 1951) | | Mayo | 6 June 2002 | 9 March 2011 | Fine Gael | Brian Cowen (2008–2011) |
| **Micheál Martin** (born 1960) | | Cork South-Central | 9 March 2011 | 27 June 2020 | Fianna Fáil | Enda Kenny (2011–2017) |
| **Micheál Martin** (born 1960) | | Cork South-Central | 9 March 2011 | 27 June 2020 | Fianna Fáil | Leo Varadkar (2017–2020) |
| Mary Lou McDonald (born 1969) | | Dublin Central | 27 June 2020 | Incumbent | Sinn Féin | Micheál Martin (2020–2022) |
| Mary Lou McDonald (born 1969) | | Dublin Central | 27 June 2020 | Incumbent | Sinn Féin | Leo Varadkar (2022–2024) |
| Mary Lou McDonald (born 1969) | | Dublin Central | 27 June 2020 | Incumbent | Sinn Féin | Simon Harris (2024–2025) |
| Mary Lou McDonald (born 1969) | | Dublin Central | 27 June 2020 | Incumbent | Sinn Féin | Micheál Martin (2025–present) |

== Leaders of the second largest party in opposition ==
- Leaders who later became Tánaiste are indicated in italics.

| Name (Birth–Death) | Portrait | Constituency | Term of office | | Party | Leader of the Opposition |
| Name (Birth–Death) | Portrait | Constituency | From | To | Party | Leader of the Opposition |
|---|---|---|---|---|---|---|
| Denis Gorey (1874–1940) | | Carlow–Kilkenny | 6 December 1922 | May 1927 | Farmers' Party | Thomas Johnson (1922–1927) |
| Michael Heffernan (1885–1970) | | Tipperary | May 1927 | 11 August 1927 | Farmers' Party | Thomas Johnson (1922–1927) |
| Thomas Johnson (1872–1963) | | Dublin County | 11 August 1927 | 11 October 1927 | Labour Party | Éamon de Valera (1927–1932) |
| Thomas J. O'Connell (1882–1969) | | Mayo South | 11 October 1927 | 9 March 1932 | Labour Party | Éamon de Valera (1927–1932) |
| William Norton (1900–1963) | | Kildare | 9 March 1932 | 8 February 1933 | Labour Party | W. T. Cosgrave (1932–1944) |
| Frank MacDermot (1886–1975) | | Roscommon | 8 February 1933 | 8 September 1933 | National Centre Party | W. T. Cosgrave (1932–1944) |
| William Norton (1900–1963) | | Kildare (1932–1937); Carlow–Kildare (1937–1948) | 8 September 1933 | 7 January 1945 | Labour Party | W. T. Cosgrave (1932–1944) |
| William Norton (1900–1963) | | Kildare (1932–1937); Carlow–Kildare (1937–1948) | 8 September 1933 | 7 January 1945 | Labour Party | Thomas F. O'Higgins (1944) |
| William Norton (1900–1963) | | Kildare (1932–1937); Carlow–Kildare (1937–1948) | 8 September 1933 | 7 January 1945 | Labour Party | Richard Mulcahy (1944–1948) |
| Joseph Blowick (1903–1970) | | Mayo South | 7 January 1945 | 18 February 1948 | Clann na Talmhan | Richard Mulcahy (1944–1948) |
| None | | | 18 February 1948 | 13 June 1951 | | Éamon de Valera (1948–1951) |
| William Norton (1900–1963) | | Kildare | 13 June 1951 | 2 June 1954 | Labour Party | John A. Costello (1951–1954) |
| Seán MacBride (1904–1988) | | Dublin South-West | 2 June 1954 | 20 March 1957 | Clann na Poblachta | Éamon de Valera (1954–1957) |
| William Norton (1900–1963) | | Kildare | 20 March 1957 | 2 March 1960 | Labour Party | John A. Costello (1957–1959) |
| William Norton (1900–1963) | | Kildare | 20 March 1957 | 2 March 1960 | Labour Party | James Dillon (1959–1965) |
| Brendan Corish (1918–1990) | | Wexford | 2 March 1960 | 14 March 1973 | Labour Party | James Dillon (1959–1965) |
| Brendan Corish (1918–1990) | | Wexford | 2 March 1960 | 14 March 1973 | Labour Party | Liam Cosgrave (1965–1973) |
| None | | | 14 March 1973 | 5 July 1977 | | Jack Lynch (1973–1977) |
| Frank Cluskey (1930–1989) | | Dublin South-Central | 5 July 1977 | 12 June 1981 | Labour Party | Garret FitzGerald (1977–1981) |
| None | | | 12 June 1981 | 17 June 1981 | | Garret FitzGerald (1977–1981) |
| Michael O'Leary (1936–2006) | | Dublin North-Central | 17 June 1981 | 30 June 1981 | Labour Party | Garret FitzGerald (1977–1981) |
| Joe Sherlock (1930–2007) | | Cork East | 30 June 1981 | 9 March 1982 | Sinn Féin the Workers Party | Charles Haughey (1981–1982) |
| Michael O'Leary (1936–2006) | | Dublin Central | 9 March 1982 | 1 November 1982 | Labour Party | Garret FitzGerald (1982) |
| Dick Spring (born 1950) | | Kerry North | 1 November 1982 | 14 December 1982 | Labour Party | Garret FitzGerald (1982) |
| Tomás Mac Giolla (1924–2010) | | Dublin West | 14 December 1982 | 21 December 1985 | Workers' Party | Charles Haughey (1982–1987) |
| Desmond O'Malley (1939–2021) | | Limerick East | 21 December 1985 | 29 June 1989 | Progressive Democrats | Charles Haughey (1982–1987) |
| Desmond O'Malley (1939–2021) | | Limerick East | 21 December 1985 | 29 June 1989 | Progressive Democrats | Alan Dukes (1987–1990) |
| Dick Spring (born 1950) | | Kerry North | 29 June 1989 | 14 December 1992 | Labour Party | Alan Dukes (1987–1990) |
| Dick Spring (born 1950) | | Kerry North | 29 June 1989 | 14 December 1992 | Labour Party | John Bruton (1990–1994) |
| Desmond O'Malley (1939–2021) | | Limerick East | 14 December 1992 | 12 October 1993 | Progressive Democrats | John Bruton (1990–1994) |
| Mary Harney (born 1953) | | Dublin South-West | 12 October 1993 | 18 November 1994 | Progressive Democrats | John Bruton (1990–1994) |
| Dick Spring (born 1950) | | Kerry North | 18 November 1994 | 15 December 1994 | Labour Party | John Bruton (1990–1994) |
| Mary Harney (born 1953) | | Dublin South-West | 15 December 1994 | 26 June 1997 | Progressive Democrats | Bertie Ahern (1994–1997) |
| Dick Spring (born 1950) | | Kerry North | 26 June 1997 | 13 November 1997 | Labour Party | John Bruton (1997–2001) |
| Ruairi Quinn (born 1946) | | Dublin South-East | 13 November 1997 | 25 October 2002 | Labour Party | John Bruton (1997–2001) |
| Ruairi Quinn (born 1946) | | Dublin South-East | 13 November 1997 | 25 October 2002 | Labour Party | Michael Noonan (2001–2002) |
| Ruairi Quinn (born 1946) | | Dublin South-East | 13 November 1997 | 25 October 2002 | Labour Party | Enda Kenny (2002–2011) |
| Pat Rabbitte (born 1949) | | Dublin South-West | 25 October 2002 | 6 September 2007 | Labour Party | Enda Kenny (2002–2011) |
| Eamon Gilmore (born 1955) | | Dún Laoghaire | 6 September 2007 | 9 March 2011 | Labour Party | Enda Kenny (2002–2011) |
| Gerry Adams (born 1948) | | Louth | 9 March 2011 | 10 February 2018 | Sinn Féin | Micheál Martin (2011–2020) |
| Mary Lou McDonald (born 1969) | | Dublin Central | 10 February 2018 | 27 June 2020 | Sinn Féin | Micheál Martin (2011–2020) |
| Alan Kelly (born 1975) | | Tipperary | 27 June 2020 | 24 March 2022 | Labour Party | Mary Lou McDonald (2020–present) |
| Ivana Bacik (born 1968) | | Dublin Bay South | 24 March 2022 | 18 December 2024 | Labour Party | Mary Lou McDonald (2020–present) |
| Holly Cairns (born 1989) | | Cork South-West | 18 December 2024 | Incumbent | Social Democrats | Mary Lou McDonald (2020–present) |

== See also ==
- Opposition Front Bench (Ireland)
- Politics of the Republic of Ireland
- Taoiseach
