= 2001 Fine Gael leadership election =

Irish political party leadership contest

- 13 January – 9 February 2001
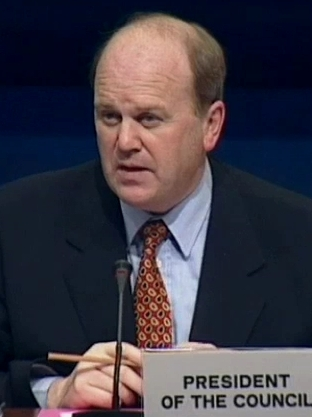

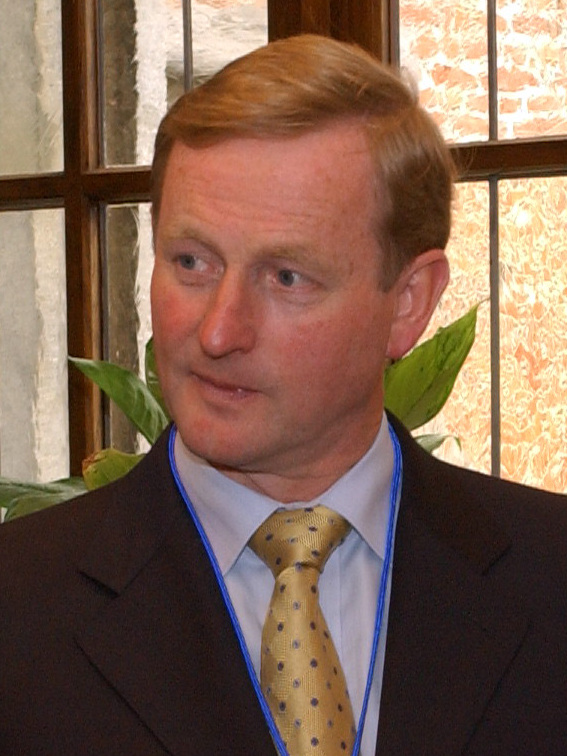

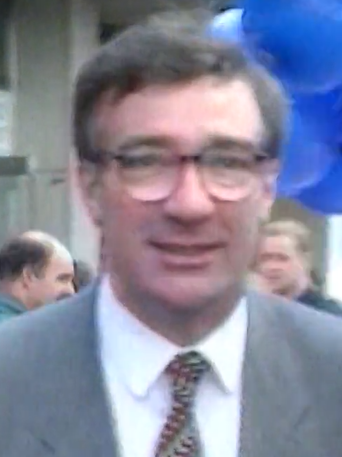

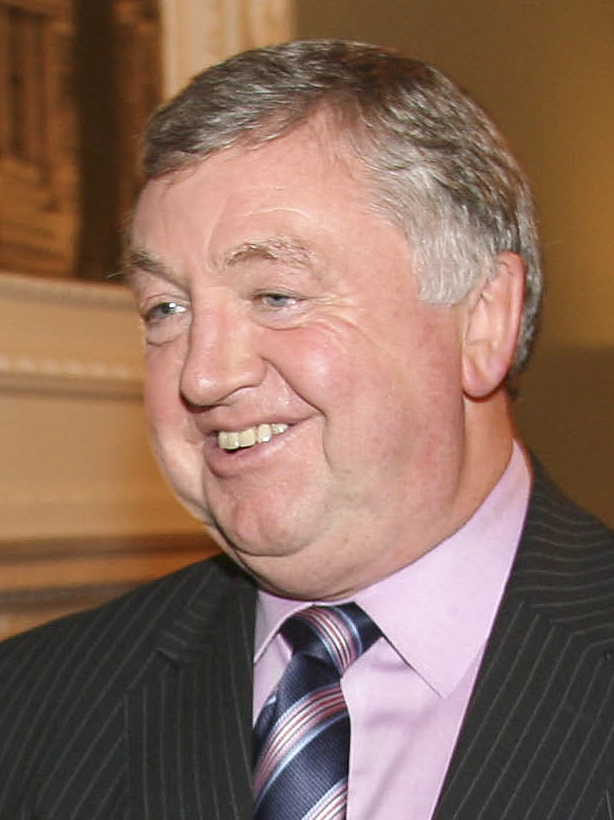
Candidate	Michael Noonan	Enda Kenny
Percentage	63%	37%
Candidate	Jim Mitchell	Bernard Allen
Percentage	Withdrew	Withdrew
Leader before election
John Bruton
Elected Leader
Michael Noonan

The Fine Gael leadership election of February 2001 was held to find a successor to John Bruton who resigned following a defeat in a motion of no confidence in his leadership of the party.

Bruton, who had been elected leader of the Fine Gael party in 1990 and had served as Taoiseach from 1994 until 1997, had faced several leadership heaves during his eleven-year tenure as leader. On 28 January Michael Noonan and Jim Mitchell, two senior members of the Fine Gael front bench, tabled a motion of no confidence in Bruton as leader of the party following low ratings in recent opinion polls. Other senior party members, including Alan Shatter, had also urged Bruton to step aside. At a special seven-hour meeting of the Fine Gael parliamentary party on 31 January, Bruton was defeated by 39 votes to 33. He duly resigned as party leader and triggered the leadership contest.

A number of candidates immediately emerged for the party leadership. Michael Noonan and Jim Mitchell, the two men who brought about Bruton's downfall, were both seen as the clear front-runners. Enda Kenny, a former cabinet minister, also declared his candidacy almost a week after the contest had started. Bernard Allen, a former junior minister, was also a late entrant into the contest. Ivan Yates, who many expected to throw his hat into the ring, surprised many when he actually announced that he intended to retire from politics at the next general election. Former party leader Alan Dukes also announced that he would not contest the leadership election after some speculation.

On 9 February 72 members of the Fine Gael parliamentary party met to decide the leadership election by secret ballot. It was only the second time ever that an election took place to decide the party leader. Michael Noonan emerged as the victor and new leader of Fine Gael.
