= Nora Owen =

Irish former politician (born 1945)

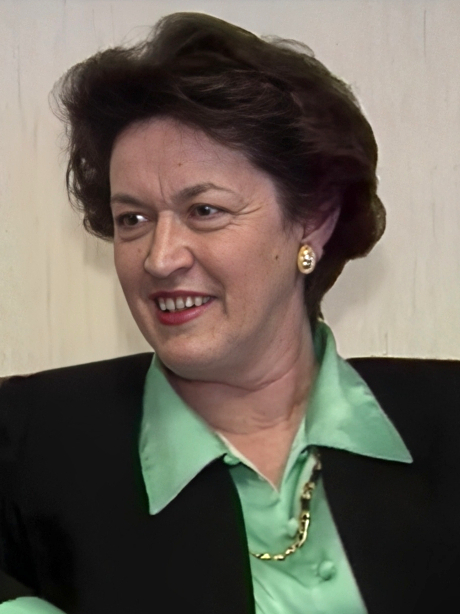
- Owen in 1996

Minister for Justice
- In office 15 December 1994 – 26 June 1997
- Taoiseach: John Bruton
- Preceded by: Máire Geoghegan-Quinn
- Succeeded by: John O'Donoghue

Deputy leader of Fine Gael
- In office 15 December 1993 – 9 February 2001
- Leader: John Bruton
- Preceded by: Peter Barry
- Succeeded by: Jim Mitchell

Teachta Dála
- In office June 1989 – May 2002
- In office June 1981 – February 1987
- Constituency: Dublin North

Personal details
- Born: Nora O'Mahony; 1 June 1945 (age 81) Malahide, Dublin, Ireland
- Party: Fine Gael
- Spouse: Brian Owen (m. 1968)
- Children: 3
- Relatives: Mary Banotti (sister); Michael Collins (great-uncle)
- Education: University College Dublin

Nora Owen (née O'Mahony; born 1 June 1945) is an Irish former Fine Gael politician who served as Minister for Justice from 1994 to 1997 and Deputy leader of Fine Gael from 1993 to 2001. She served as a Teachta Dála (TD) for the Dublin North constituency from 1981 to 1987 and 1989 to 2002.

She was a presenter of TV3's topical programme Midweek.

== Early life ==
Owen was born in Dublin in 1945. She is a sister of Mary Banotti and a grandniece of the Irish revolutionary leader Michael Collins. She was educated at Dominican Convent, County Wicklow and University College Dublin (UCD) where she qualified as an industrial chemist.

== Political career ==
Owen was first elected to Dublin County Council in 1979 for the Malahide local electoral area. She was later elected as a Fine Gael TD for the first time in 1981, serving until the 1987 election when she lost her seat. That year she became a member of the executive of Trócaire. She returned to Dáil Éireann following the 1989 general election. In 1993, she became Deputy leader of Fine Gael. The following year she became Minister for Justice, remaining in that post until 1997. She undertook a significant programme of criminal law reform. Among the major changes she implemented was the referendum on bail in 1996, leading to the Bail Act, of 1997, which allows a court to refuse bail to those charged with a serious offence where it is considered necessary to prevent them committing a serious offence. Journalist Veronica Guerin was murdered in 1996 and in its aftermath, Owen introduced the highly successful Criminal Assets Bureau to crack down on organised crime. In 2002, she became the first high-profile Fine Gael TD to lose her seat in Dublin North in the party's disastrous general election result.

== Post-political life ==
Owen is the patron of the Collins 22 Society, which works to keep the memory and legacy of Michael Collins in living memory. She occasionally works as an election pundit. In August 2011, it was announced she was to present the Irish version of Mastermind on TV3.

Political offices
Preceded by Máire Geoghegan-Quinn	Minister for Justice; 1994–1997	Succeeded by John O'Donoghue
Party political offices
Preceded by Peter Barry	Deputy leader of Fine Gael; 1993–2001	Succeeded by Jim Mitchell

Dáil	Election	Deputy (Party)	Deputy (Party)	Deputy (Party)	Deputy (Party)	Deputy (Party)	Deputy (Party)	Deputy (Party)	Deputy (Party)
4th	1923	Alfie Byrne (Ind.)	Francis Cahill (CnaG)	Margaret Collins-O'Driscoll (CnaG)	Seán McGarry (CnaG)	William Hewat (BP)	Richard Mulcahy (CnaG)	Seán T. O'Kelly (Rep)	Ernie O'Malley (Rep)
4th	1925 by-election	Alfie Byrne (Ind.)	Patrick Leonard (CnaG)	Margaret Collins-O'Driscoll (CnaG)	Oscar Traynor (Rep)	William Hewat (BP)	Richard Mulcahy (CnaG)	Seán T. O'Kelly (Rep)	Ernie O'Malley (Rep)
5th	1927 (Jun)	Alfie Byrne (Ind.)	John Byrne (CnaG)	Margaret Collins-O'Driscoll (CnaG)	Oscar Traynor (SF)	Denis Cullen (Lab)	Richard Mulcahy (CnaG)	Seán T. O'Kelly (FF)	Kathleen Clarke (FF)
6th	1927 (Sep)	Alfie Byrne (Ind.)	John Byrne (CnaG)	Margaret Collins-O'Driscoll (CnaG)	Patrick Leonard (CnaG)	James Larkin (IWL)	Richard Mulcahy (CnaG)	Seán T. O'Kelly (FF)	Eamonn Cooney (FF)
6th	1928 by-election	Alfie Byrne (Ind.)	John Byrne (CnaG)	Margaret Collins-O'Driscoll (CnaG)	Patrick Leonard (CnaG)	Vincent Rice (CnaG)	Richard Mulcahy (CnaG)	Seán T. O'Kelly (FF)	Eamonn Cooney (FF)
6th	1929 by-election	Thomas F. O'Higgins (CnaG)	John Byrne (CnaG)	Margaret Collins-O'Driscoll (CnaG)	Patrick Leonard (CnaG)	Vincent Rice (CnaG)	Richard Mulcahy (CnaG)	Seán T. O'Kelly (FF)	Eamonn Cooney (FF)
7th	1932	Alfie Byrne (Ind.)	John Byrne (CnaG)	Margaret Collins-O'Driscoll (CnaG)	Oscar Traynor (FF)	Cormac Breathnach (FF)	Richard Mulcahy (CnaG)	Seán T. O'Kelly (FF)	Eamonn Cooney (FF)
8th	1933	Alfie Byrne (Ind.)	Patrick Belton (CnaG)	Vincent Rice (CnaG)	Oscar Traynor (FF)	Cormac Breathnach (FF)	Richard Mulcahy (CnaG)	Seán T. O'Kelly (FF)	Eamonn Cooney (FF)
9th	1937	Constituency abolished. See Dublin North-East and Dublin North-West							

Dáil	Election	Deputy (Party)	Deputy (Party)	Deputy (Party)	Deputy (Party)
22nd	1981	Ray Burke (FF)	John Boland (FG)	Nora Owen (FG)	3 seats 1981–1992
23rd	1982 (Feb)	Ray Burke (FF)	John Boland (FG)	Nora Owen (FG)	3 seats 1981–1992
24th	1982 (Nov)	Ray Burke (FF)	John Boland (FG)	Nora Owen (FG)	3 seats 1981–1992
25th	1987	Ray Burke (FF)	John Boland (FG)	G. V. Wright (FF)	3 seats 1981–1992
26th	1989	Ray Burke (FF)	Nora Owen (FG)	Seán Ryan (Lab)	3 seats 1981–1992
27th	1992	Ray Burke (FF)	Nora Owen (FG)	Seán Ryan (Lab)	Trevor Sargent (GP)
28th	1997	Ray Burke (FF)	Nora Owen (FG)	G. V. Wright (FF)	Trevor Sargent (GP)
28th	1998 by-election	Seán Ryan (Lab)	Nora Owen (FG)	G. V. Wright (FF)	Trevor Sargent (GP)
29th	2002	Seán Ryan (Lab)	Jim Glennon (FF)	G. V. Wright (FF)	Trevor Sargent (GP)
30th	2007	James Reilly (FG)	Michael Kennedy (FF)	Darragh O'Brien (FF)	Trevor Sargent (GP)
31st	2011	James Reilly (FG)	Alan Farrell (FG)	Brendan Ryan (Lab)	Clare Daly (SP)
32nd	2016	Constituency abolished. See Dublin Fingal			
