= Michael Noonan (Fine Gael politician) =

Irish former politician (born 1943)

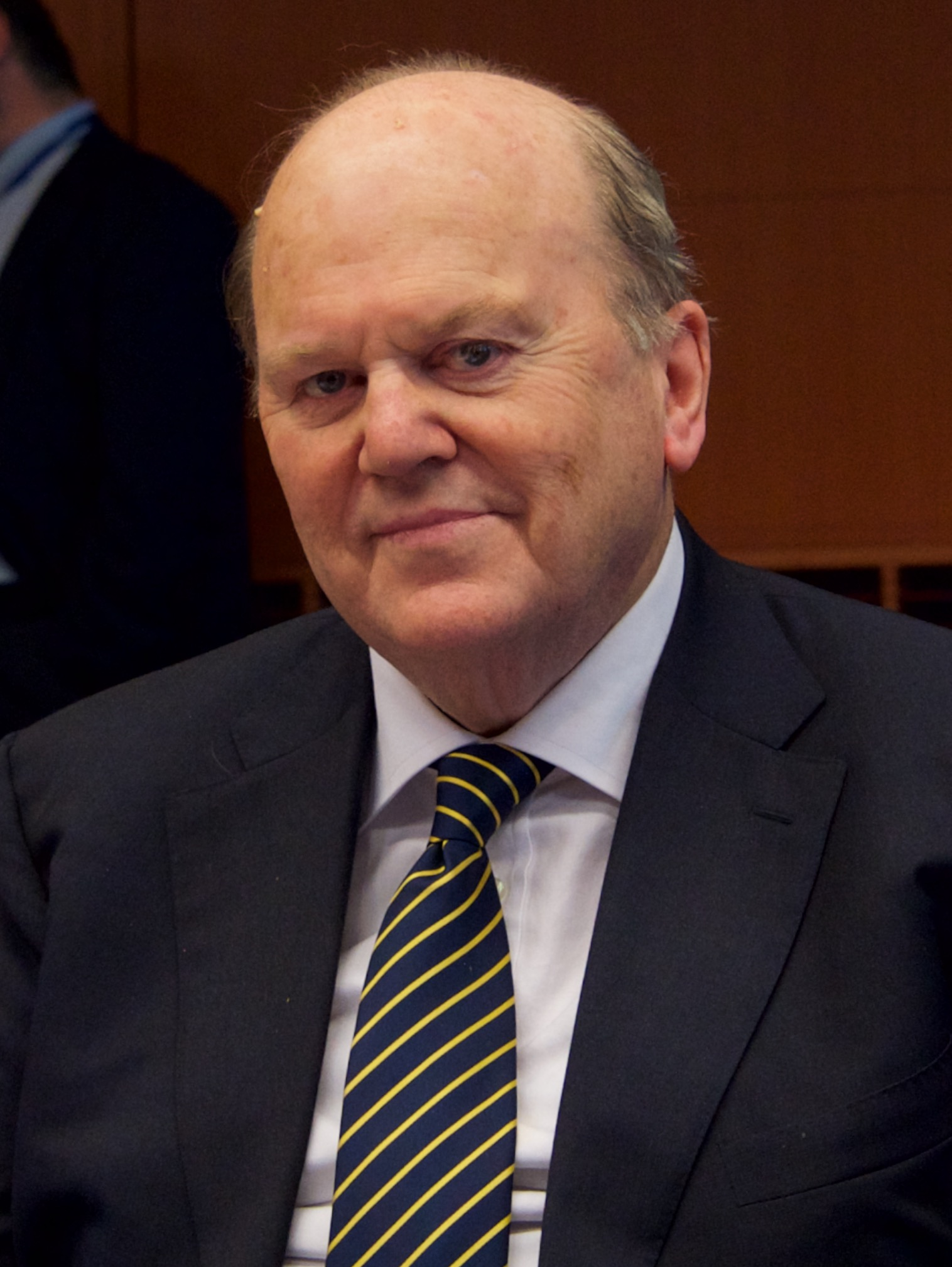
- Noonan in 2017

Minister for Finance
- In office 9 March 2011 – 14 June 2017
- Taoiseach: Enda Kenny
- Preceded by: Brian Lenihan
- Succeeded by: Paschal Donohoe

Chair of the Public Accounts Committee
- In office 21 October 2004 – 29 April 2007
- Preceded by: John Perry
- Succeeded by: Bernard Allen

Leader of the Opposition
- In office 9 February 2001 – 5 June 2002
- Taoiseach: Bertie Ahern
- Preceded by: John Bruton
- Succeeded by: Enda Kenny

Leader of Fine Gael
- In office 9 February 2001 – 5 June 2002
- Deputy: Jim Mitchell
- Preceded by: John Bruton
- Succeeded by: Enda Kenny

Minister for Health
- In office 15 December 1994 – 26 June 1997
- Taoiseach: John Bruton
- Preceded by: Michael Woods
- Succeeded by: Brian Cowen

Minister for Industry and Commerce
- In office 14 February 1986 – 10 March 1987
- Taoiseach: Garret FitzGerald
- Preceded by: John Bruton (Industry, Trade, Commerce and Tourism)
- Succeeded by: Albert Reynolds

Minister for Energy
- In office 20 January 1987 – 10 March 1987
- Taoiseach: Garret FitzGerald
- Preceded by: Dick Spring
- Succeeded by: Ray Burke

Minister for Justice
- In office 14 December 1982 – 14 February 1986
- Taoiseach: Garret FitzGerald
- Preceded by: Seán Doherty
- Succeeded by: Alan Dukes

Teachta Dála
- In office February 2011 – February 2020
- Constituency: Limerick City
- In office June 1981 – February 2011
- Constituency: Limerick East

Personal details
- Born: 21 May 1943 (age 83) Limerick, Ireland
- Party: Fine Gael
- Spouse: Florence Knightley (m. 1969; died 2012)
- Children: 5
- Education: University College Dublin; St Patrick's College, Dublin

Michael Noonan (born 21 May 1943) is an Irish former Fine Gael politician who served as Minister for Finance from 2011 to 2017, Leader of the Opposition and Leader of Fine Gael from 2001 to 2002, Minister for Health from 1994 to 1997, Minister for Industry and Commerce from 1986 to 1987, Minister for Energy from January 1987 to March 1987 and Minister for Justice from 1982 to 1986. He served as a Teachta Dála (TD) from 1981 to 2020.

Noonan had been a member of every Fine Gael cabinet since 1982, serving in the cabinets of Garret FitzGerald, John Bruton and Enda Kenny. During these terms of office, he held the positions of Justice, Energy, Industry and Commerce, Health and Finance. When Fine Gael lost power after the 1997 general election, Noonan remained an important figure in the party when he became Opposition Spokesperson for Finance.

He succeeded John Bruton as Leader of Fine Gael and Leader of the Opposition in 2001, however, he resigned following Fine Gael's disastrous showing at the 2002 general election. After eight years as a backbencher, during which time he served as Chairman of the Public Accounts Committee, Fine Gael leader Enda Kenny appointed Noonan to his front bench in 2010, to his former portfolio of Spokesperson for Finance.

== Early life ==
The son of a local school teacher, Noonan was born in Limerick in 1943, but raised in Loughill, County Limerick. He was educated at the local National School and St. Patrick's Secondary School in Glin, before studying to be a primary school teacher at St. Patrick's College, Drumcondra, Dublin. He subsequently completed a BA and H.Dip. in English and Economics at University College Dublin. He began to work as a secondary school teacher in Dublin. Noonan developed an interest in politics from his mother, whose family had been heavily involved in Fine Gael at the local level in Limerick, and joined the Dublin branch of the party after graduating from university. He returned to Limerick in the late 1960s, where he took up a teaching post at Crescent College. Here he continued his involvement in politics, canvassing for the Fine Gael candidate, James O'Higgins, in the Limerick East by-election in 1968, caused by the death of Donogh O'Malley.

== Political career ==
=== Early years: 1974–1982 ===
Having been involved in the local Fine Gael organisation in Limerick since the late 1960s, Noonan first held political office in 1974, when he was elected as a member of Limerick County Council. Having built up a local profile he contested the 1981 general election for the party and secured a seat in Limerick East. Upon taking his Dáil seat, Noonan became a full-time politician, giving up his teaching post and resigning his seat on Limerick County Council. Fine Gael formed a coalition government with the Labour Party. Noonan, a first-time TD, remained on the backbenches.

=== Cabinet minister: 1982–1987 ===
Fine Gael lost office following the February 1982 general election; Noonan subsequently joined the party's front bench as Spokesperson for Education. The November 1982 general election, following the collapse of the Fianna Fáil government, saw another Fine Gael–Labour Party coalition take office. Just eighteen months after entering the Dáil, Noonan was appointed as Minister for Justice. After a few weeks in office, he revealed the illegal phone-tapping of journalists' phones, carried out by the previous Fianna Fáil administration that preceded it in power. That government had authorised illegal phone tapping of the journalists Geraldine Kennedy, Bruce Arnold and Vincent Browne. Seán Doherty signed warrants for the taps while serving as Minister for Justice. Noonan introduced a new Criminal Justice Bill while also bringing in reforms in the Garda Síochána, the courts and the prison service and the facing down of a difficult prison officers' dispute. He also dealt with the wording of the abortion referendum in 1983. Noonan, however, also presided over the justice ministry when inmates in an overcrowded and understaffed Spike Island prison set fire to the building.

A cabinet reshuffle in 1986, saw Noonan demoted to the position of Minister for Industry and Commerce. Following the withdrawal of the Labour Party from government in 1987, Noonan also briefly took office as Minister for Energy.

=== Opposition: 1987–1994 ===
Fine Gael lost power following the 1987 general election and was confined to the opposition benches. The new Fine Gael leader, Alan Dukes, appointed Noonan to the senior position of front bench Spokesperson for Finance and the Public Service. The party did poorly under Dukes and he was replaced by John Bruton in 1990. Noonan was retained on the new front bench, however, he was demoted to the position of Spokesperson for Transport, Energy and Communications. In 1991, he returned to local politics as a member of Limerick County Council, serving again until 1994. Noonan's period in opposition often saw him at odds with his party leader. Not long after his demotion as Spokesperson for Finance, he announced that he would be taking "positions of leadership" on a wide range of important issues. This was seen as a veiled threat to John Bruton's leadership, with Noonan positioning himself as an alternative party leader. In 1994, several Fine Gael TDs attempted to oust Bruton as party leader following poor showings in opinion polls. Noonan aligned himself with the rebels and stated that he would stand for the leadership should Bruton be defeated. The latter survived as leader and Noonan resigned from the front bench.

=== Minister for Health: 1994–1997 ===
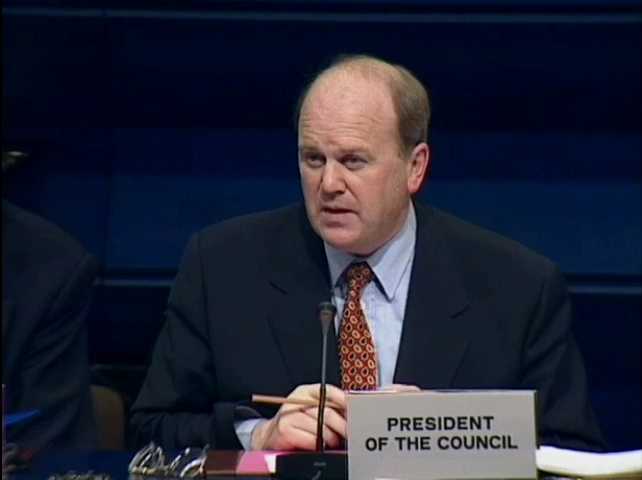
Noonan in November 1996

In 1994, the Rainbow Coalition was formed and Noonan became Minister for Health. The Department of Health was embroiled in a scandal at the time regarding blood products contaminated with hepatitis C virus, caused by the negligence of the Blood Transfusion Service Board. Noonan consistently held a strict line on the case of Brigid McCole and would not budge on his views, suffering as a result of the scandal. He threatened to take Bridget's mother Ellen to the Supreme Court, when she wondered why her daughter had contracted the disease. Noonan was forced to establish the Hepatitis C Tribunal of Inquiry and to issue several apologies for his handling of the affair. Noonan remained as Minister for Health until the 1997 general election. The Irish Times said "the woman involved had been infected by a negligent State agency, in the biggest health scandal since its foundation." When RTÉ broadcast a drama, No Tears, on Noonan's treatment of Bridget McCole, Justine McCarthy wrote in the Irish Independent that Noonan "compounded the perception of a heartless pedant by whingeing about the way he was depicted in the drama's final episode, broadcast on the same night that he declined to appear on Questions & Answers and when it was reported that yet another woman who was infected by the State had died from the illness."

His home was picketed by anti-abortion campaign group Youth Defence.

=== Return to Opposition: 1997–2011 ===
==== Leader of Fine Gael: 2001–2002 ====
Despite increasing their seats to 54, Fine Gael returned to opposition and Noonan became Opposition Spokesman for Finance following the 1997 general election. In 2001, following a series of disastrous opinion polls, Noonan and his colleague, Jim Mitchell, tabled a motion of no confidence in the leader, John Bruton. The motion was successful in ousting Bruton as leader, with Noonan becoming leader of Fine Gael and Leader of the Opposition with Mitchell becoming deputy leader. Noonan avoided requests to be interviewed on TV and radio programmes, including some on RTÉ and Today FM, ahead of the leadership election.

At the 2002 general election, Fine Gael had a disastrous result, dropping from 54 seats to 31 and several high-profile front bench member losses, including Alan Dukes, Deirdre Clune, Alan Shatter and deputy leader Jim Mitchell. Noonan resigned as Fine Gael leader on the night of the election.

==== TD: 2002–2011 ====
He was succeeded as leader by Enda Kenny, the runner-up to Noonan in the 2001 leadership election. Noonan remained as a TD and was re-elected at the 2007 general election, and went on to serve on Kenny's Front bench. He was vice-chairperson of the Joint Oireachtas Committee on Constitutional Amendment and Children.

=== Minister for Finance: 2011–2017 ===
In July 2010, Noonan was promoted to the Fine Gael Front Bench as Spokesperson for Finance. In an August 2010 interview with the Sunday Independent, Noonan said he hoped to become Minister for Finance.

At the 2011 general election, he was re-elected as a TD for Limerick City, receiving 13,291 (30.8% 1st preference) votes. On 9 March 2011, he was appointed Minister for Finance by Taoiseach Enda Kenny.

In March 2011, the International Monetary Fund (IMF) and the European Union (EU) backed the proposed programme for government and gave the coalition the green light to make changes to the terms of the multibillion-euro bailout. After meeting officials from the IMF – including Ireland mission head Ajai Chopra – European Central Bank (ECB) and European Commission (EC), Noonan said it was agreed the terms of the rescue deal would be altered, as long as the financial targets remain the same. "What was being discussed in general terms was our proposal that the conditions and the memorandum of understanding would be changed for alternative conditions which are in the programme for government", Noonan said.

In July 2011, Noonan speaking after an EU summit on 21 July said that the new deal agreed with euro zone leaders means a second bailout for Ireland is "off the table". The deal will see a reduction in the interest rate on bailout loans to Greece, Ireland, Portugal and Italy. This followed a 10-hour emergency summit at which eurozone leaders agreed to provide a second international bailout worth €109 billion to Greece. The plan will be funded by eurozone countries, the proceeds of privatisations and the anticipated €12.6 billion benefit of a debt buyback programme. Noonan said a provision in the agreement meant Ireland would not have to go back to markets when the programme ended if the country had not reached its deficit target. "There's a commitment that if countries continue to fulfil the conditions of their programme, the European authorities will continue to supply them with money even when the programme concludes," he said. There would be "little or no easing" of budgetary conditions for this year, but there could be more positive implications in later years. "I'm afraid we still have to face the music in December," he said.

In November 2011, he said the payment of more than €700 million to Anglo Irish Bank bondholders was "the lesser of two evils". On 16 May 2012, Noonan caused controversy with his Greek "holidays" and "feta cheese" comment at a breakfast briefing with Bloomberg news agency. Noonan said these were the only links between Ireland and Greece. He attended the 2012 Bilderberg Conference in his capacity of Minister for Finance at Chantilly, Virginia, from 31 May-3 June 2012. On 5 December 2012, he delivered his second budget as Minister for Finance, which included a new property tax to be introduced in 2013.

In February 2013, a deal was reached with the European Central Bank (ECB) about the promissory note used to bail out the former Anglo Irish Bank. Noonan said that the government had achieved its objectives in the negotiations with the ECB and that the arrangement meant that there would be €1bn less taken from them in terms of taxes and spending cuts up to 2015. Noonan said that the government did not ask for a write down on the Anglo Irish debt during negotiations with the ECB as "the ECB does not do write-downs".

On 15 October 2013, he delivered the 2014 budget.

Following improvements in Ireland's unemployment rate and outlook for growth, the securing of the February 2013 Anglo Irish Bank promissory note deal with the European Central Bank, and Ireland's exit from the EU/IMF/ECB bailout programme and successful return to the bond markets, Noonan was named Europe's best Finance Minister for the previous year in January 2014 by the Financial Times-owned magazine The Banker.

When the European Central Bank raised the limit on the amount of emergency liquidity assistance (ELA) available to Greek banks by about €2 billion at the height of the country's government-debt crisis in June 2015, Noonan joined his German counterpart Wolfgang Schäuble in arguing forcefully for limits on the amount of ELA approved by the central bank unless capital controls were introduced.

In July 2016, the Central Statistics Office announced 2015 Irish GDP growth of 26.3% and Irish GNP growth of 18.7%. The growth became known internationally by the pejorative term, leprechaun economics. Noonan attributed the figures to multinational restructuring following the closure of the double Irish tax scheme, however they were subsequently attributed to Apple in 2018 (widely suspected in 2016). Noonan came to the defense of Apple when the European Commission announced in August 2016 that it had found against Apple in its investigation of illegal State aid. Noonan led the rejection of any claim by Ireland to the EU Commission's €13 billion fine on Apple, calling it an "attack" by the commission, and was supported by the main opposition party. In October 2016, Noonan introduced changes in the 2016 Finance Act to curb tax abuses of section 110 special purpose vehicles, (securitisation vehicles for IFSC firms), by US distressed debt funds in Ireland (pejoratively called vulture funds in the Irish media). Investigations into these abuses by the financial media, showed the scale and rapid gains these funds were making from NAMA's disposal program, and that these gains were free of Irish taxes. It led to some revision as to whether Noonan had been too quick in selling State assets to distressed debt funds, and had given overly generous tax benefits and incentives.

=== Retirement ===
In May 2017, he announced he would be stepping down as Minister for Finance in the coming weeks when a new Taoiseach was appointed. He retired from the Dáil at the 2020 general election

== Personal life ==
Noonan married Florence Knightley, a native of Castlemaine, County Kerry and a primary school teacher, in 1969. They had three sons: Tim, John and Michael, and two daughters: Orla and Deirdre. In May 2010, Noonan appeared on RTÉ's The Frontline to talk about his wife's battle with Alzheimer's disease. Florence Noonan died on 23 February 2012 of pneumonia.

== See also ==
- EU illegal State aid case against Apple in Ireland

Political offices
Preceded by Seán Doherty	Minister for Justice; 1982–1986	Succeeded by Alan Dukes
Preceded by John Bruton as Minister for Industry, Trade, Commerce and Tourism	Minister for Industry and Commerce; 1986–1987	Succeeded by Albert Reynolds
Preceded by Dick Spring	Minister for Energy; 1987	Succeeded by Ray Burke
Preceded by Michael Woods	Minister for Health; 1994–1997	Succeeded by Brian Cowen
Preceded by John Bruton	Leader of the Opposition; 2001–2002	Succeeded by Enda Kenny
Preceded by Brian Lenihan	Minister for Finance; 2011–2017	Succeeded by Paschal Donohoe
Party political offices
Preceded by John Bruton	Leader of Fine Gael; 2001–2002	Succeeded by Enda Kenny

Dáil	Election	Deputy (Party)	Deputy (Party)	Deputy (Party)	Deputy (Party)	Deputy (Party)
13th	1948	Michael Keyes (Lab)	Robert Ryan (FF)	James Reidy (FG)	Daniel Bourke (FF)	4 seats 1948–1981
14th	1951	Michael Keyes (Lab)	Tadhg Crowley (FF)	James Reidy (FG)	Daniel Bourke (FF)	4 seats 1948–1981
14th	1952 by-election	Michael Keyes (Lab)	Tadhg Crowley (FF)	James Reidy (FG)	John Carew (FG)	4 seats 1948–1981
15th	1954	Michael Keyes (Lab)	Tadhg Crowley (FF)	Donogh O'Malley (FF)	John Carew (FG)	4 seats 1948–1981
16th	1957	Ted Russell (Ind.)	Paddy Clohessy (FF)	Donogh O'Malley (FF)	John Carew (FG)	4 seats 1948–1981
17th	1961	Stephen Coughlan (Lab)	Paddy Clohessy (FF)	Donogh O'Malley (FF)	Tom O'Donnell (FG)	4 seats 1948–1981
18th	1965	Stephen Coughlan (Lab)	Paddy Clohessy (FF)	Donogh O'Malley (FF)	Tom O'Donnell (FG)	4 seats 1948–1981
18th	1968 by-election	Stephen Coughlan (Lab)	Paddy Clohessy (FF)	Desmond O'Malley (FF)	Tom O'Donnell (FG)	4 seats 1948–1981
19th	1969	Stephen Coughlan (Lab)	Michael Herbert (FF)	Desmond O'Malley (FF)	Tom O'Donnell (FG)	4 seats 1948–1981
20th	1973	Stephen Coughlan (Lab)	Michael Herbert (FF)	Desmond O'Malley (FF)	Tom O'Donnell (FG)	4 seats 1948–1981
21st	1977	Michael Lipper (Ind.)	Michael Herbert (FF)	Desmond O'Malley (FF)	Tom O'Donnell (FG)	4 seats 1948–1981
22nd	1981	Jim Kemmy (Ind.)	Peadar Clohessy (FF)	Desmond O'Malley (FF)	Tom O'Donnell (FG)	Michael Noonan (FG)
23rd	1982 (Feb)	Jim Kemmy (DSP)	Willie O'Dea (FF)	Desmond O'Malley (FF)	Tom O'Donnell (FG)	Michael Noonan (FG)
24th	1982 (Nov)	Frank Prendergast (Lab)	Willie O'Dea (FF)	Desmond O'Malley (FF)	Tom O'Donnell (FG)	Michael Noonan (FG)
25th	1987	Jim Kemmy (DSP)	Willie O'Dea (FF)	Desmond O'Malley (PDs)	Peadar Clohessy (PDs)	Michael Noonan (FG)
26th	1989	Jim Kemmy (DSP)	Willie O'Dea (FF)	Desmond O'Malley (PDs)	Peadar Clohessy (PDs)	Michael Noonan (FG)
27th	1992	Jim Kemmy (Lab)	Willie O'Dea (FF)	Desmond O'Malley (PDs)	Peadar Clohessy (PDs)	Michael Noonan (FG)
28th	1997	Jim Kemmy (Lab)	Willie O'Dea (FF)	Desmond O'Malley (PDs)	Eddie Wade (FF)	Michael Noonan (FG)
28th	1998 by-election	Jan O'Sullivan (Lab)	Willie O'Dea (FF)	Desmond O'Malley (PDs)	Eddie Wade (FF)	Michael Noonan (FG)
29th	2002	Jan O'Sullivan (Lab)	Willie O'Dea (FF)	Tim O'Malley (PDs)	Peter Power (FF)	Michael Noonan (FG)
30th	2007	Jan O'Sullivan (Lab)	Willie O'Dea (FF)	Kieran O'Donnell (FG)	Peter Power (FF)	Michael Noonan (FG)
31st	2011	Constituency abolished. See Limerick City and Limerick				

Dáil	Election	Deputy (Party)	Deputy (Party)	Deputy (Party)	Deputy (Party)
31st	2011	Jan O'Sullivan (Lab)	Willie O'Dea (FF)	Kieran O'Donnell (FG)	Michael Noonan (FG)
32nd	2016	Jan O'Sullivan (Lab)	Willie O'Dea (FF)	Maurice Quinlivan (SF)	Michael Noonan (FG)
33rd	2020	Brian Leddin (GP)	Willie O'Dea (FF)	Maurice Quinlivan (SF)	Kieran O'Donnell (FG)
34th	2024	Conor Sheehan (Lab)	Willie O'Dea (FF)	Maurice Quinlivan (SF)	Kieran O'Donnell (FG)
