= Tallaght Strategy =

Political policy followed by Fine Gael political party in Ireland (1987–89)

The Tallaght Strategy was a policy followed by the Fine Gael opposition party in Ireland after the 1987 general election. Under this policy, Fine Gael would not oppose economic reforms proposed by the Fianna Fáil minority government in the national interest. This strategy was a major departure from the conventional normalities of Irish political behaviour, with a bitter division between the two main parties Fianna Fáil and Fine Gael dating back to the Irish Civil War of the 1920s.

The strategy was named after a speech given by Fine Gael party leader Alan Dukes to the Tallaght Chamber of commerce on 2 September 1987:

When the Government is moving in the right direction, I will not oppose the central thrust of its policy. If it is going in the right direction, I do not believe that it should be deviated from its course, or tripped up on macro-economic issues.

Although it did not benefit the party directly – Fine Gael gained only four seats in the 1989 general election, and did not form part of the subsequent government – Fine Gael maintain that this policy of cooperation between the opposition and the government laid the foundations for the Celtic Tiger economic boom of the 1990s – "A decision by the Fine Gael opposition to support all moves towards fiscal reform...allowed the fierce spending and tax cuts that began to transform Ireland from a banana republic into a 'Celtic Tiger'."

During an RTÉ interview on 7 September 2008, the Fine Gael leader Enda Kenny, commenting on the worsening economic situation in Ireland said that Fine Gael "would work in the interest of the economy and the people" but ruled out a return to the Tallaght Strategy.

In October 2010, Minister for Communications, Energy and Natural Resources Eamon Ryan of the Green Party, called for a 'Tallaght Strategy Mark Two' in order to pass the 2011 government budget. Fine Gael rejected calls for a new Tallaght Strategy.

== See also ==
- 20th Government of Ireland
