= John Bruton =

Taoiseach from 1994 to 1997

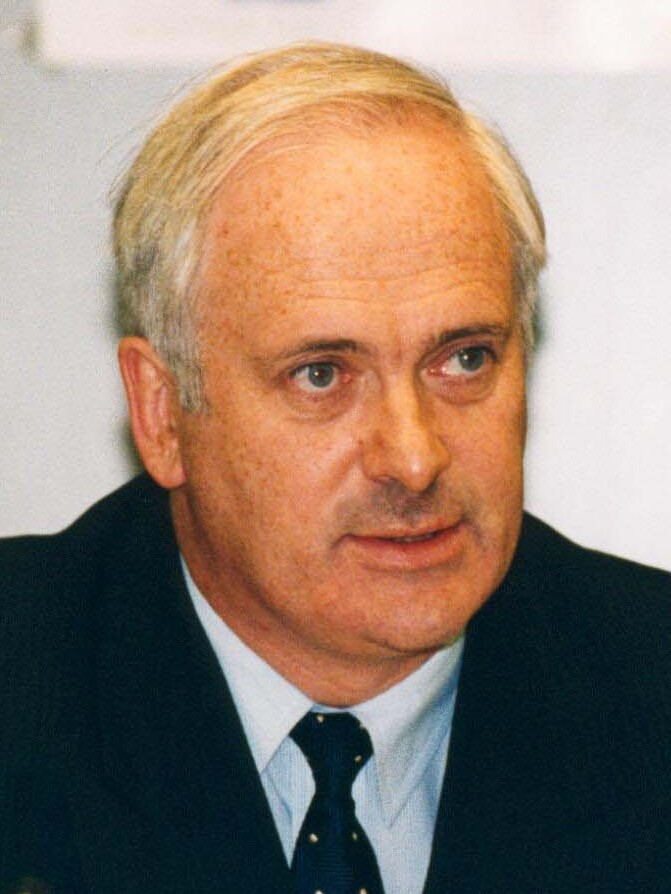
- Bruton in 1996

Taoiseach
- In office 15 December 1994 – 26 June 1997
- President: Mary Robinson
- Tánaiste: Dick Spring
- Preceded by: Albert Reynolds
- Succeeded by: Bertie Ahern

European Union Ambassador to the United States
- In office 24 November 2004 – 31 October 2009
- President: José Manuel Barroso
- Preceded by: Günter Burghardt
- Succeeded by: Angelos Pangratis (acting)

Leader of the Opposition
- In office 26 June 1997 – 9 February 2001
- Taoiseach: Bertie Ahern
- Preceded by: Bertie Ahern
- Succeeded by: Michael Noonan
- In office 20 November 1990 – 15 December 1994
- Taoiseach: Charles Haughey; Albert Reynolds
- Preceded by: Alan Dukes
- Succeeded by: Bertie Ahern

Leader of Fine Gael
- In office 21 November 1990 – 9 February 2001
- Deputy: Peter Barry; Nora Owen
- Preceded by: Alan Dukes
- Succeeded by: Michael Noonan

Deputy leader of Fine Gael
- In office 26 March 1987 – 20 November 1990
- Leader: Alan Dukes
- Preceded by: Peter Barry
- Succeeded by: Peter Barry
Ministerial offices 1981‍–‍1987
Minister for the Public Service
In office 20 January 1987 – 10 March 1987
Taoiseach	Garret FitzGerald
Preceded by	Ruairi Quinn
Succeeded by	Alan Dukes
Minister for Finance
In office 14 February 1986 – 10 March 1987
Taoiseach	Garret FitzGerald
Preceded by	Alan Dukes
Succeeded by	Ray MacSharry
In office 30 June 1981 – 9 March 1982
Taoiseach	Garret FitzGerald
Preceded by	Gene Fitzgerald
Succeeded by	Ray MacSharry
Minister for Industry, Trade, Commerce and Tourism
In office 13 December 1983 – 14 February 1986
Taoiseach	Garret FitzGerald
Preceded by	Garret FitzGerald (acting)
Succeeded by	Michael Noonan
Minister for Industry and Energy
In office 14 December 1982 – 13 December 1983
Taoiseach	Garret FitzGerald
Preceded by	Albert Reynolds
Succeeded by	Dick Spring
Parliamentary Secretary
1973–1977	Education; Industry and Commerce

Teachta Dála
- In office June 1969 – 31 October 2004
- Constituency: Meath

Personal details
- Born: 18 May 1947 Dunboyne, County Meath, Ireland
- Died: 6 February 2024 (aged 76) Dublin, Ireland
- Party: Fine Gael
- Other political affiliations: European People's Party
- Spouse: Finola Gill (m. 1978)
- Children: 4
- Relatives: Richard Bruton (brother)
- Education: University College Dublin; King's Inns
- Awards: Commander Grand Cross of the Order of the Polar Star
- Website: Official website

John Gerard Bruton (18 May 1947 – 6 February 2024) was an Irish Fine Gael politician who served as Taoiseach from 1994 to 1997 and Leader of Fine Gael from 1990 to 2001. He held cabinet positions between 1981‍ and 1987, including twice as minister for finance. He was Leader of the Opposition from 1990 to 1994 and 1997 to 2001. He served as a Teachta Dála (TD) for Meath from 1969 to 2004.

During his term as Taoiseach, he led a Fine Gael–Labour–Democratic Left coalition, known as the Rainbow Coalition. After stepping down as a TD, he accepted an offer to become European Union Ambassador to the United States, serving from 2004 to 2009.

== Early and personal life ==
John Gerard Bruton was born to a wealthy, Catholic farming family in Dunboyne, County Meath, and educated at Clongowes Wood College.

Oliver Coogan notes in his Politics and War in Meath 1913–23 that Bruton's grand-uncle was one of the farmers in south Meath who prevented the traditionally Anglo-Irish ascendency hunt from proceeding in the area during the Irish War of Independence.

Bruton later went on to study at University College Dublin (UCD), where he received an honours Bachelor of Arts degree and qualified as a barrister from King's Inns, but never went on to practice law. Bruton was narrowly elected to Dáil Éireann in the 1969 general election, as a Fine Gael TD for Meath. At the age of 22, he was one of the youngest ever members of the Dáil at that time. He more than doubled his vote in the 1973 general election, which brought Fine Gael to power as part of the National Coalition with the Labour Party. Bruton was appointed Parliamentary Secretary to the Minister for Industry and Commerce and the Minister for Education, in the National Coalition in 1973. He remained in office until 1977.

In 1978, Bruton married Finola Gill; and they had four children.

== Shadow cabinet and in government ==
Following Fine Gael's defeat at the 1977 general election, the new leader, Garret FitzGerald, appointed Bruton to the front bench as Spokesperson on Agriculture. He was later promoted as Spokesperson for Finance, making a particularly effective speech in the Dáil in response to the budget of 1980. He played a prominent role in Fine Gael's campaign in the 1981 general election, which resulted in another coalition with the Labour Party, with FitzGerald as Taoiseach. Bruton received a personal vote in Meath of nearly 23%, and at the age of only 34 was appointed Minister for Finance, the most senior position in the cabinet. In light of overwhelming economic realities, the government abandoned its election promises to cut taxes. The government collapsed unexpectedly on the night of 27 January 1982, when Bruton's budget was defeated in the Dáil. The previously supportive Independent Socialist TD Jim Kemmy, voted against the budget, which proposed among other things the introduction of VAT on children's shoes. FitzGerald sought a dissolution of the Dáil, which was granted by the president.

=== First leadership bid ===
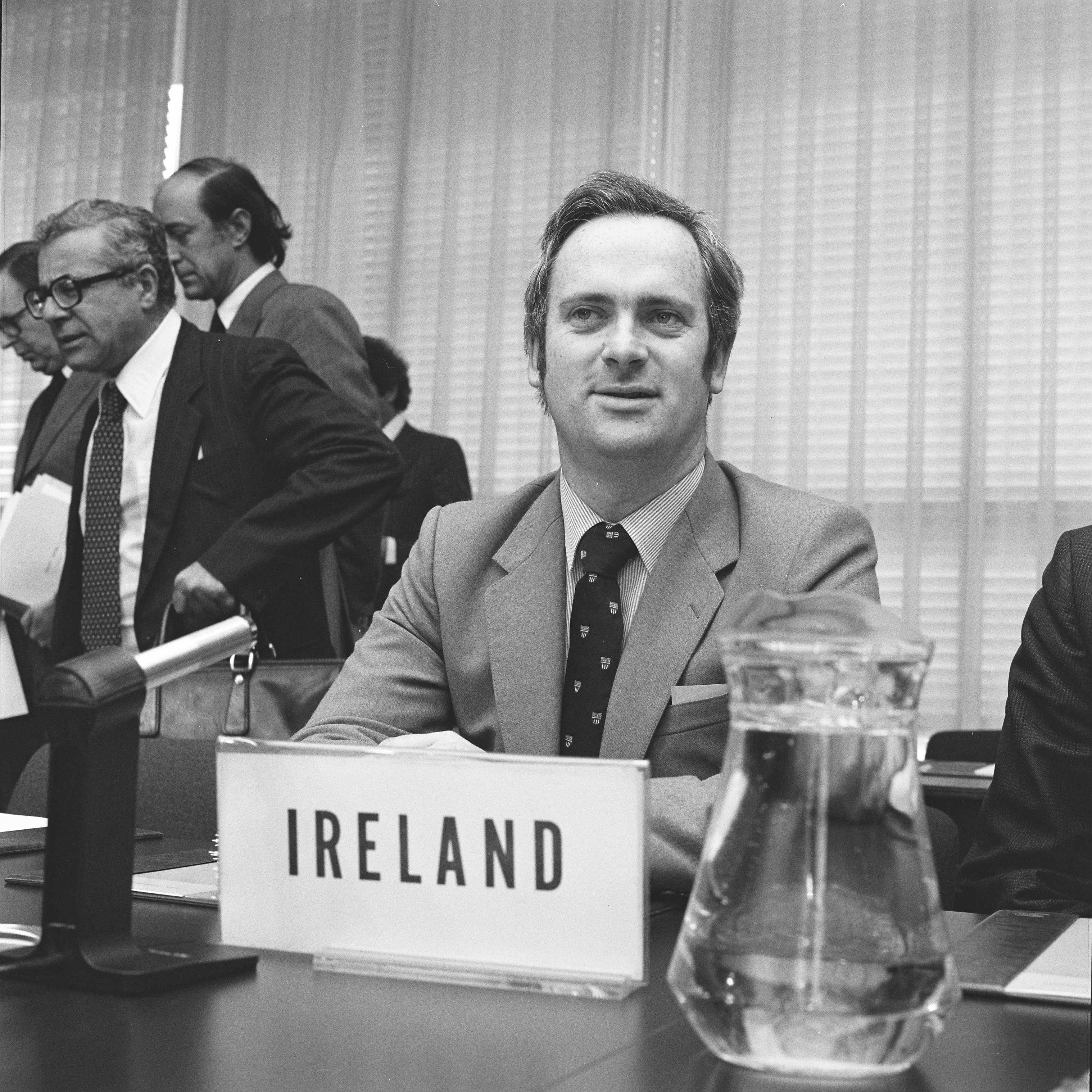
Bruton in Brussels, 1981

The minority Fianna Fáil government which followed only lasted until November 1982, when Fine Gael once again returned to power in a coalition government with the Labour Party, but when the new government was formed, Bruton was moved from Finance to become Minister for Industry and Energy. After a reconfiguration of government departments in 1983, Bruton became Minister for Industry, Trade, Commerce and Tourism. In a cabinet reshuffle in February 1986, Bruton was appointed again as Minister for Finance. Although he was minister for finance, Bruton never presented his budget. The Labour Party withdrew from the government due to a disagreement over his budget proposals leading to the collapse of the government and another election.

Following the 1987 general election Fine Gael suffered a heavy defeat. Garret FitzGerald resigned as leader immediately, and a leadership contest ensued between Alan Dukes, Peter Barry and Bruton himself. The exact result of the vote was not published. (Note: Different reports suggested that either Barry or Bruton came a poor third.) This was a blow to Bruton as the victor, Dukes, had been a TD for 12 years fewer than him. Bruton was on Fine Gael's right wing, whereas Dukes was in FitzGerald's social democratic and liberal mould. Dukes was perceived to be a lacklustre leader, however, who alienated his party's TDs and Senators and made little progress in recovering the ground lost by Fine Gael in 1987. His Tallaght Strategy where he stated that he would support Fianna Fáil on economic reforms was also unpopular. The disastrous performance in the 1990 presidential election, in which the party finished in a humiliating and then unprecedented third in a national election, (Note: Fine Gael candidate Austin Currie finished third with 17%, behind Labour's Mary Robinson and Fianna Fáil's Brian Lenihan.) proved to be the final straw for the party and Dukes was forced to resign as leader shortly after. Bruton, who was the deputy leader of Fine Gael at the time, was unopposed in the ensuing leadership election.

== Leadership of Fine Gael ==
Whereas Dukes came from the social democratic wing of Fine Gael, Bruton came from the more conservative wing. However to the surprise of critics and of conservatives, in his first policy initiative, he called for a referendum on a Constitutional amendment permitting the enactment of legislation allowing for divorce in Ireland.

Fine Gael had been in decline for nearly a decade; from the high point of the November 1982 general election when it achieved 70 seats in Dáil Éireann (only five seats short of Fianna Fáil's total). (Note: Fianna Fáil since 1932 had been by far the bigger of the two parties, often with double the number of Dáil seats of Fine Gael.) The party had lost a considerable number of seats over the following ten years. Following the inexperienced Dukes' disastrous period of leadership, Bruton's election was seen as offering Fine Gael a chance to rebuild under a far more politically experienced leader. However, Bruton's perceived right-wing persona and his rural background were used against him by critics and particularly by the media.

By the 1992 general election, the anti-Fianna Fáil mood in the country produced a major swing to the opposition, but that support went to the Labour Party, not Bruton's Fine Gael, which lost a further 10 seats. Even then, it initially appeared that Fine Gael was in a position to form a government. However, negotiations stalled in part from Labour's refusal to be part of a coalition which would include the libertarian Progressive Democrats, as well as Bruton's unwillingness to take Democratic Left into a prospective coalition. The Labour Party broke off talks with Fine Gael and opted to enter a new coalition with Fianna Fáil. It was a humiliating blow to Bruton, as the Labour Party was always seen as a natural ally of Fine Gael rather than Fianna Fáil. Fine Gael, and Bruton personally, continued to perform poorly in opinion polls throughout 1993 and early 1994, Bruton narrowly survived a challenge to his leadership in early 1994. However, a couple of by-election victories, and a good performance in the 1994 European elections, coupled with a disastrous showing by the Labour Party, shored up his position.

In late 1994, the government of Fianna Fáil's Albert Reynolds collapsed. Bruton was able to persuade Labour to end its coalition with Fianna Fáil and enter a new coalition government with Fine Gael and Democratic Left. Bruton faced charges of hypocrisy for agreeing to enter government with the Democratic Left, as Fine Gael campaigned in the 1992 general election on a promise not to enter government with the party. Nevertheless, on 15 December, aged 47, Bruton became the then youngest ever Taoiseach. This was the first time in the history of the state that a new government was installed without a general election being held.

== Taoiseach (1994–1997) ==
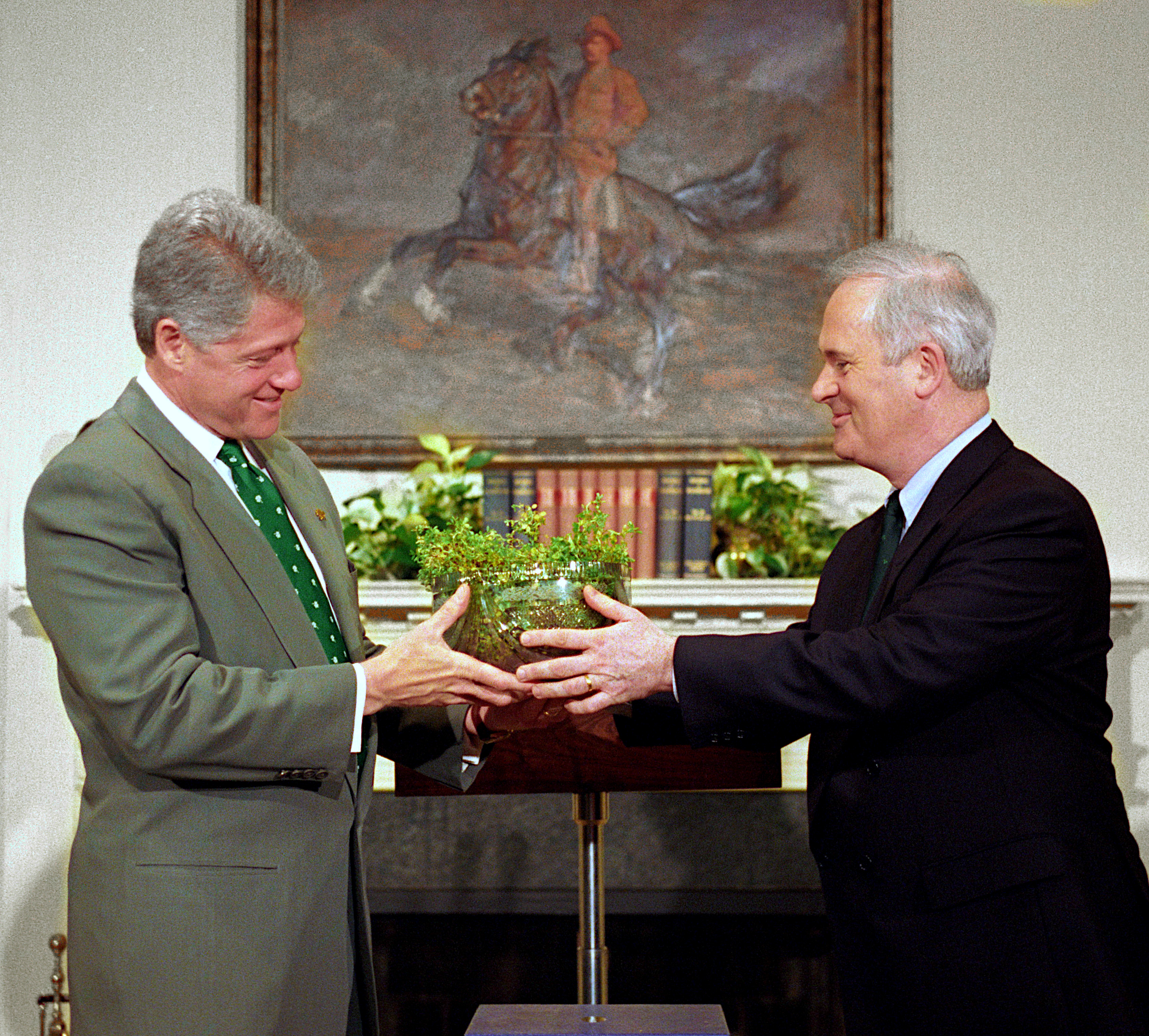
Bruton (right) giving a bowl of shamrocks to US president Bill Clinton on Saint Patrick's Day, 1995

Continued developments in the Northern Ireland peace process and his attitude to Anglo-Irish relations came to define Bruton's tenure as Taoiseach. In February 1995, he launched the Anglo-Irish 'Framework Document' with the British prime minister, John Major. This document outlined new proposed relations between Ireland, Northern Ireland and the United Kingdom. Many of Bruton's opponents considered him to be too willing to accommodate unionist demands and Albert Reynolds nicknamed him "John Unionist". However, he took a strongly critical position on the British Government's reluctance to engage with Sinn Féin during the IRA's 1994–1997 ceasefire. Bruton complained to a local radio reporter in Cork that "I am sick of answering questions about the fucking peace process", for which he later apologised.

Bruton also established a working relationship with Gerry Adams of Sinn Féin, however, both were mutually distrustful of each other. The relationship became frayed following the ending of the ceasefire in 1996, resulting in a bomb explosion in London. These relations worsened when the IRA killed Jerry McCabe, a member of the Garda Síochána, in a botched post office robbery in County Limerick, and another bomb explosion in Manchester. However, Bruton received widespread praise in the Republic for condemning the Royal Ulster Constabulary for yielding to loyalist threats at Drumcree by allowing members of the Orange Order to parade through a nationalist district. He stated that the RUC had been neither impartial nor consistent in applying the law. His outrage and criticism led to a tense atmosphere between London and Dublin. By the time of the 1997 general election, Sinn Féin stated that they would prefer a Fianna Fáil led government and the IRA resumed their ceasefire soon after Fine Gael lost the 1997 general election.

He also presided over a successful Irish Presidency of the European Union in 1996 and helped finalise the Stability and Growth Pact, which establishes macroeconomic parameters for countries participating in the single European currency, the euro. Bruton was the fifth Irish leader to address a joint session of the United States Congress on 11 September 1996, (Note: Six Irish leaders have addressed joint sessions of the US Congress: Seán T. O'Kelly (1959), Éamon de Valera (1964), Liam Cosgrave (1976), Garret FitzGerald (1984), Bruton (1996) and Bertie Ahern (2008).) as the 30th head of state or government of an EU country to do so since 1945.

Bruton's government suffered from some allegations of corruption, and political embarrassment. In 1996, the Minister for Transport, Energy and Communication, Michael Lowry, resigned from the cabinet after allegations that he had not paid income tax on payments from the supermarket tycoon, Ben Dunne, for work he had done for him as a businessman before becoming a Minister. Phil Hogan, Minister of State at the Department of Finance, resigned on 9 February 1995 as a result of leaks of budget information from the Department of Finance on the day the budget was delivered in the Dail. Additionally, many years later Frank Dunlop made allegations before the planning tribunal that he had informed Bruton about demands for a £250,000 bribe made to him by a Fine Gael Dublin City Councillor, Tom Hand, to rezone the Quarryvale development. Dunlop testified that when he informed Bruton of the bribery attempts, Bruton replied, "There are no angels in the world or in Fine Gael." Bruton vehemently denied this and Fine Gael counsel told the Planning Tribunal in 2003: "I refute entirely Mr Dunlop's contention that he advised me then of the alleged demand made to him by the late Tom Hand". However, following further evidence at the tribunal, Bruton returned to it in October 2007 and conceded that "it gradually came back to me", and that Dunlop, "did say to me something about a Councillor looking for money". However, in his evidence to the tribunal in 2007, Dunlop himself said that he had not mentioned any figure of 250,000 to Bruton in his 1993 conversation with him.

Bruton presided over the first official visit by a member of the British royal family since 1912, by Charles, Prince of Wales. His welcome speech was criticised in some newspapers as being too effusive but his assessment was that the visit was helpful in improving Anglo-Irish relations.

Following the murder of crime journalist Veronica Guerin, his government established the Criminal Assets Bureau.

== Post-Taoiseach period ==
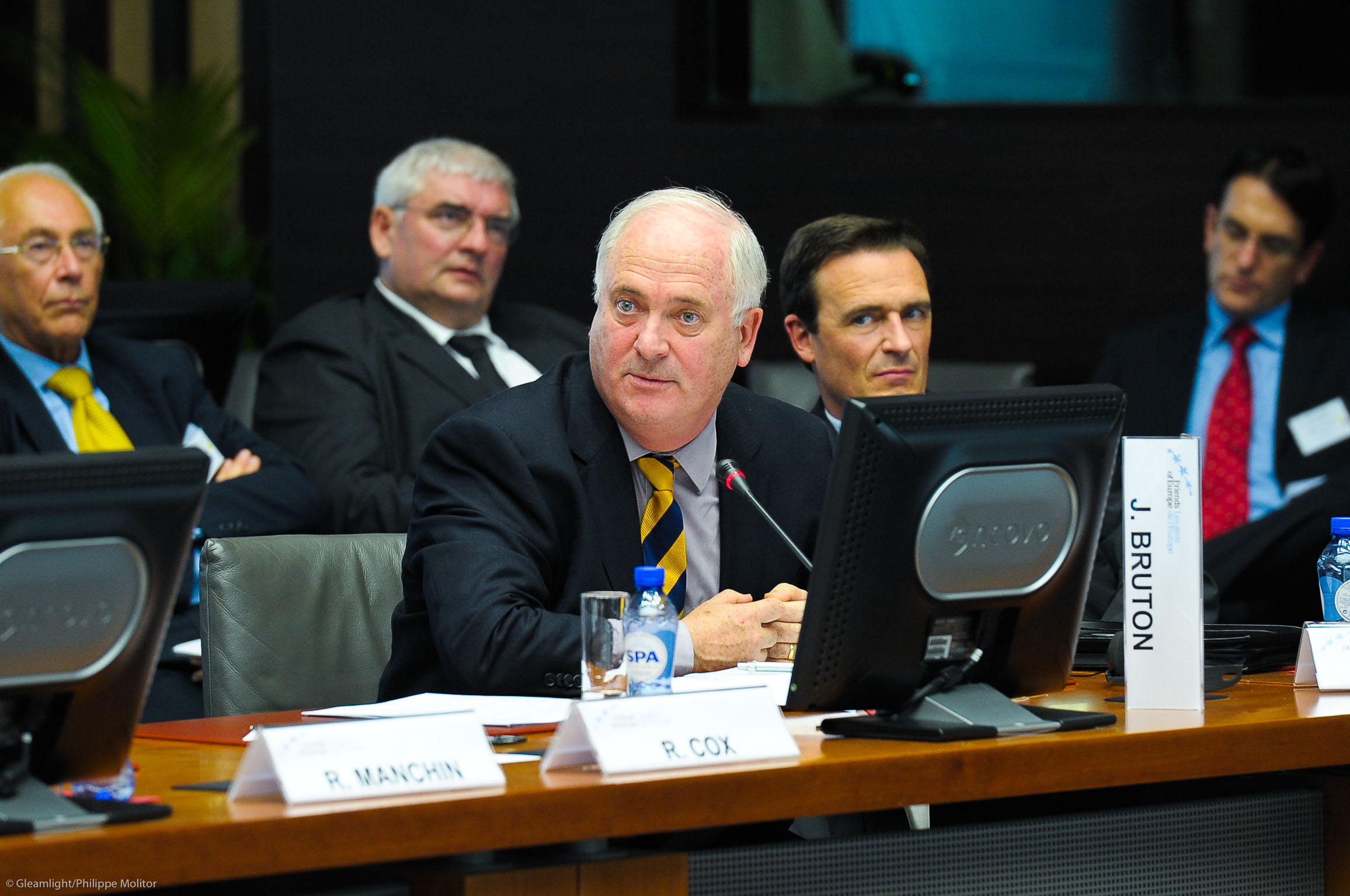
Bruton in 2011

At the 1997 general election, Fine Gael won 54 seats, a gain of 9 seats. However, the Labour Party suffered considerable losses, falling from 32 seats to 17, while the Democratic Left also lost two seats. This left Bruton far short of the parliamentary support he needed to retain office. A Fianna Fáil–Progressive Democrat coalition led by Bertie Ahern entered office, with Bruton reverting to opposition leadership.

Fine Gael became paralysed in opposition. Bruton was deposed from leadership in 2001, in favour of Michael Noonan, due in part to fears Fine Gael would suffer severe losses in the 2002 election. However, Noonan failed to live up to expectations and the party suffered an even greater collapse than had been expected under Bruton. Having hoped to make gains on its seat count of 54, it only won 31. This not only tied Fine Gael's second-worst performance in an election but was 39 seats fewer than at its high point twenty years earlier in 1982.

Bruton, a passionate supporter of European integration, was chosen as one of the two Irish Parliament Representatives to the European Convention, which helped draft the proposed European Constitution. He was one of two National Parliament Representatives to sit on the 12-member Praesidium, which helped steer the European Convention. He was a member of the Comité d'Honneur of the Institute of International and European Affairs, along with Peter Sutherland and Bertie Ahern. He served as a vice-president of the European People's Party (EPP). He accepted an offer to become European Union Ambassador to the United States, in the summer of 2004, and after resigning from the Dáil on 1 November 2004, he assumed that office. Bruton was praised by Ahern, who said Bruton had played "a pivotal role in developing Ireland's relations with the European Union."

Bruton received an Honorary Doctorate from Memorial University of Newfoundland in 2003, and from the University of Missouri in 2009.

He regularly lectured at national and international universities. In early 2004, he accepted a position as an Adjunct Faculty Member in the School of Law and Government at Dublin City University. In November 2008, he was awarded Commander Grand Cross of the Order of the Polar Star from the Government of Sweden.

His brother, Richard Bruton, is also a Fine Gael politician and has served in several ministerial roles, most recently as Minister for Communications, Climate Action and Environment.

On 29 October 2009, it was announced that he had written to the Ambassadors to the United States of the 27 members of the European Union expressing his interest in applying for the position of President of the European Council following the implementation of the Lisbon Treaty. Bruton was very much an outside shot for the position as EU leaders firmly indicated they want a chairman-style president rather than a high-profile figurehead to fill the post. Herman Van Rompuy, the Belgian Prime Minister, was appointed President of the European Council on 19 November 2009 and took office on 1 December 2009.

On 21 May 2010, it was announced that he would be the chairman of the newly formed financial services body, IFSC Ireland. His main role was to promote Ireland as a location of choice for international financial services.

Bruton was widely discussed as a candidate for the 2011 presidential election and was approached by Fine Gael with the opportunity to become their candidate; on 28 May 2011, however, Bruton stated that he was "flattered" to be asked, but would not be a candidate for the presidency.

From November 2011, Bruton acted as an advisor to Fair Observer focusing mainly on the areas of politics, finance and economics as well as on issues pertaining to Europe.

== Political views ==
=== Irish nationalism ===
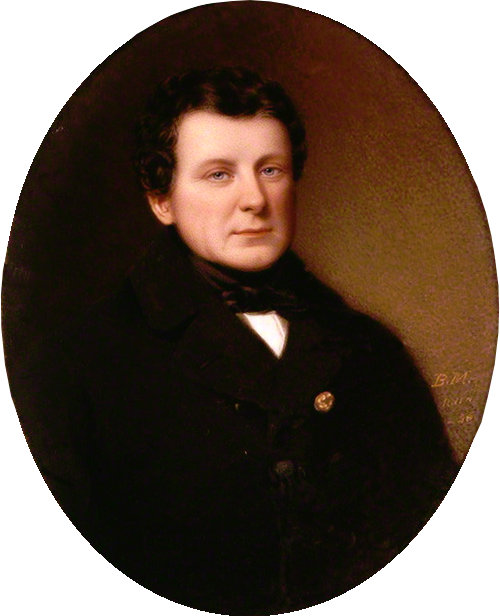
Daniel O'Connell

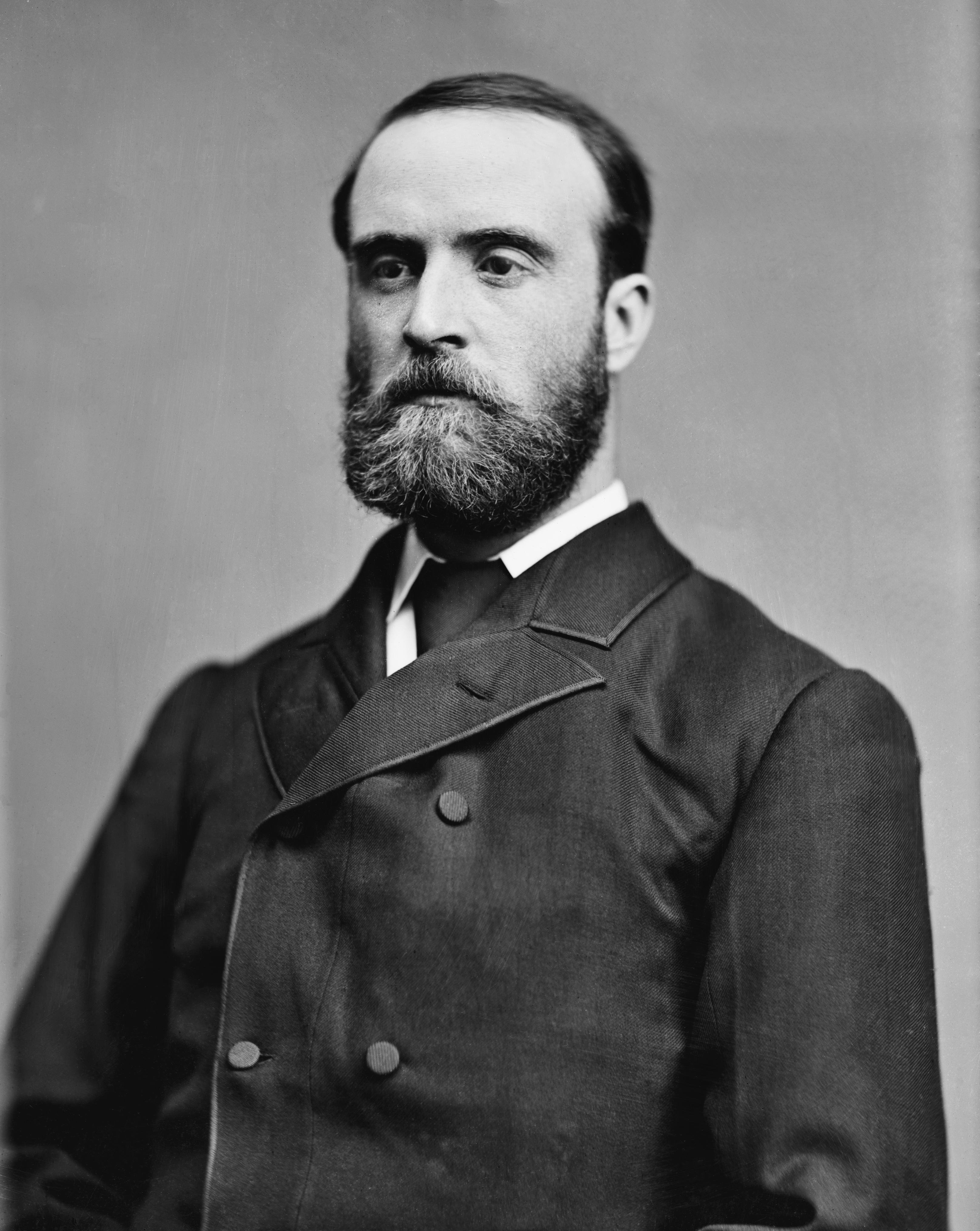
Charles Stewart Parnell

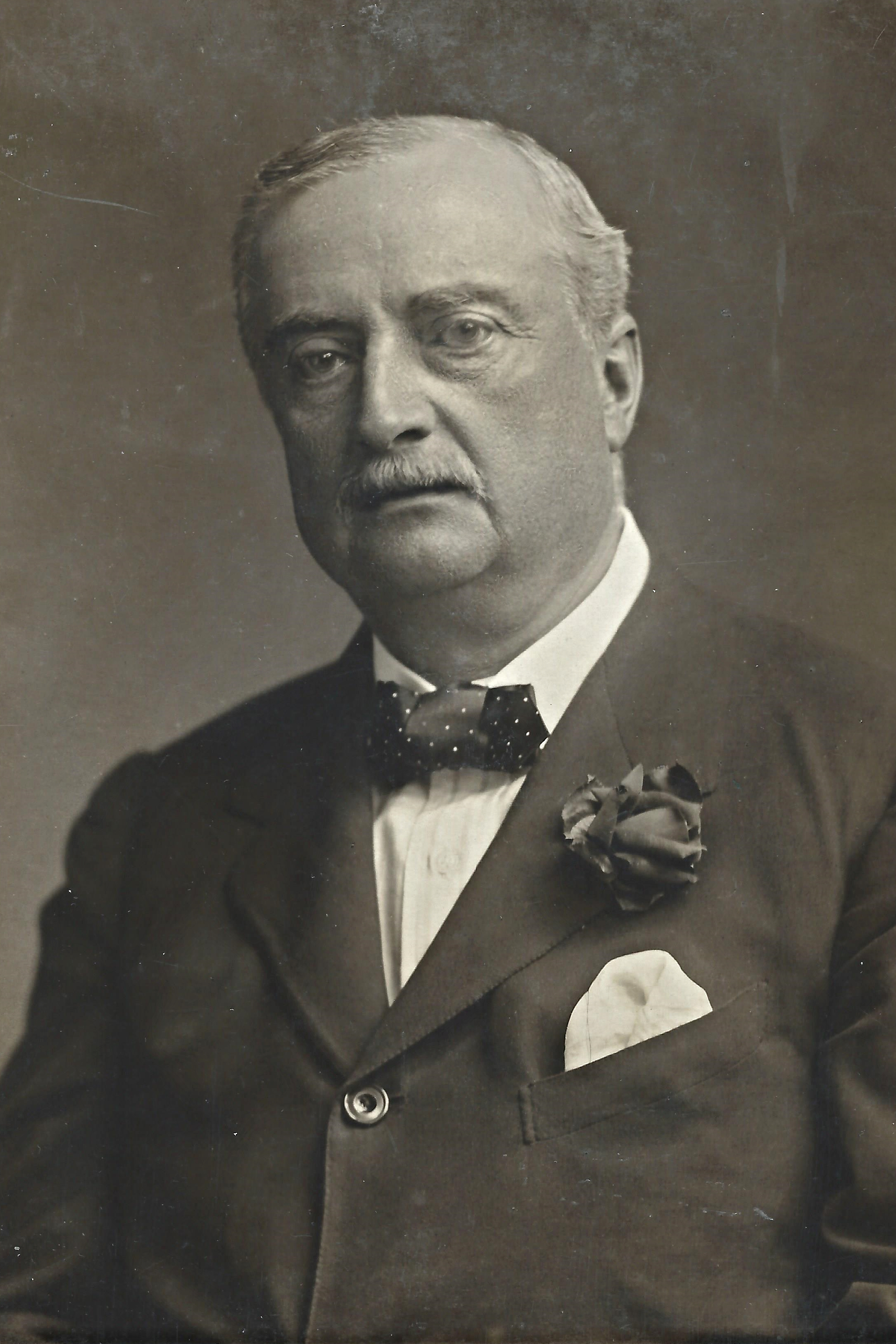
John Redmond

Bruton firmly considered himself within the tradition of moderate, parliamentary nationalism epoused by figures such as O'Connell, Parnell and Redmond

Throughout his career, Bruton identified himself with the "Redmondite tradition" of Irish nationalism, meaning a non-violent, constitutionalist version of Irish nationalism in the tradition of the Irish Parliamentary Party that was predominant in Ireland before the Easter Rising of 1916. In addition to Redmond, Bruton modelled himself on 19th-century Irish leaders such as Daniel O’Connell and Charles Stewart Parnell. This caused Bruton to ideologically clash with many Irish politicians, particularly those in the Irish Republican tradition. In particular, Gerry Adams, leader of Sinn Féin and Bruton clashed ideologically several times over the course of their lives. Speaking in 2010 during the RTÉ history/documentary show Taoiseach, Adams stated that while he found Bruton a very professional politician, he could not fathom how Bruton could toast to Queen Elizabeth II and Prince Charles (Note: Bruton attended a dinner with Prince Charles in 1995 and gave a toast to Queen Elizabeth II) while "the Queen's troops were beating the hell out of people in prisons, housing estates and villages throughout the six counties". Bruton, on the same show, argued that he couldn't engage the Unionist community in Northern Ireland without engaging their head of state.

Bruton's allegiance to the Redmondite identity led to him being dubbed "John Unionist" by Republicans; first by Albert Reynolds of Fianna Fáil, but repeated by Adams.

==== Analysis of the Easter Rising of 1916 ====
In 2014, on the 100th anniversary of the signing of the Government of Ireland Act 1914, Bruton said the 1916 Easter Rising was not a "just war", in the Catholic understanding of the term, because it was not a last resort. In Bruton's view, because home rule was coming to Ireland, the Easter Rising was unnecessary because another vehicle for independence was available.

Gerry Adams directly challenged Bruton on this assertion. Adams argued that Bruton's view was naïve; the Home Rule Bill had been suspended due to the First World War and would have introduced only a limited form of devolution, likely with partition. Adams also attacked Bruton’s silence on the role John Redmond played in encouraging tens of thousands of Irishmen to fight in a foreign war, where over 30,000 Irish died. Adams defended the Rising as a justified response to Imperialism and said Bruton's real fear was the radical egalitarian ideals of the 1916 Proclamation, which still challenged privilege in Ireland today. In a direct response, Bruton rejected Adams' claim that he "denigrated" the 1916 rebels; Bruton insisted he respected the bravery of the Easter Rising rebels but questioned the wisdom of their leaders. Bruton argued that Home Rule had already been won peacefully in 1914, and the Rising unnecessarily prolonged conflict, causing avoidable deaths. Bruton stressed that parliamentary methods, not violence, offered a better path to Irish self-governance; he pointed out that Adams himself eventually adopted peaceful politics with greater success. He criticised the lack of commemoration for the Home Rule Act compared to 1916 celebrations, warning against glorifying violence over democratic achievement.

=== Other views ===
In the 1980s, Bruton was considered to be a part of the more conservative Christian Democrat wing of Fine Gael, as opposed to the Social Liberal wing of the party associated with Garrett FitzGerald and his successor Alan Dukes. The view of Bruton as a conservative continued into the 1990s during his tenure as Taoiseach. Nevertheless, Bruton threw the weight of his leadership behind Fine Gael's successful effort to legalise divorce in 1995 via referendum.

Bruton supported the "No" campaign during the 2018 Irish referendum on abortion. Bruton argued that abortion is inconsistent with Ireland’s philosophy of protecting life. He criticised the Government’s proposed legislation as too liberal and advocated for a more cautious approach. Bruton maintained that while trauma such as rape is serious, ending a life is irreversible. He argued that constitutional protection for the fetus reflects Irish values.

== Death ==
Bruton died aged 76 on 6 February 2024 at the Mater Private Hospital in Dublin, having had cancer for some time. A state funeral was held on 10 February at St Peter's and St Paul's Church in Dunboyne being subsequently buried in nearby Rooske Cemetery. Taoiseach Leo Varadkar delivered an oration as he was laid to rest.

== Governments led ==
Bruton led the following government:

- 24th government of Ireland (27th Dáil; December 1994 – June 1997)

== Notes ==
Political offices
Preceded by Jim Tunney	Parliamentary Secretary to the Minister for Education; 1973–1977	Succeeded by Jim Tunney
New office	Parliamentary Secretary to the Minister for Industry and Commerce; 1973–1977	Succeeded by Máire Geoghegan-Quinn
Preceded by Gene Fitzgerald	Minister for Finance; 1981–1982	Succeeded by Ray MacSharry
Preceded by Albert Reynolds	Minister for Industry and Energy; 1982–1983	Succeeded by Dick Spring
Preceded by Garret FitzGerald (acting)	Minister for Industry, Trade, Commerce and Tourism; 1983–1986	Succeeded by Michael Noonan
Preceded by Alan Dukes	Minister for Finance; 1986–1987	Succeeded by Ray MacSharry
Preceded by Ruairi Quinn	Minister for the Public Service; 1987	Succeeded by Ray MacSharry
Preceded by Alan Dukes	Leader of the Opposition; 1990–1994	Succeeded by Bertie Ahern
Preceded by Albert Reynolds	Taoiseach; 1994–1997	Succeeded by Bertie Ahern
Preceded by Romano Prodi	President of the European Council; 1996	Succeeded by Wim Kok
Preceded by Bertie Ahern	Leader of the Opposition; 1997–2001	Succeeded by Michael Noonan
Party political offices
Preceded by Peter Barry	Deputy leader of Fine Gael; 1987–1990	Succeeded by Peter Barry
Preceded by Alan Dukes	Leader of Fine Gael; 1990–2001	Succeeded by Michael Noonan
Diplomatic posts
Preceded by Günter Burghardt	European Union Ambassador to the United States; 2004–2009	Succeeded by Angelos Pangratis (acting)
Honorary titles
Preceded by Des Foley	Baby of the Dáil; 1969–1975	Succeeded by Máire Geoghegan-Quinn

Dáil	Election	Deputy (Party)	Deputy (Party)	Deputy (Party)
4th	1923	Patrick Mulvany (FP)	David Hall (Lab)	Eamonn Duggan (CnaG)
5th	1927 (Jun)	Matthew O'Reilly (FF)	David Hall (Lab)	Eamonn Duggan (CnaG)
6th	1927 (Sep)	Matthew O'Reilly (FF)	Arthur Matthews (CnaG)	Eamonn Duggan (CnaG)
7th	1932	James Kelly (FF)	Arthur Matthews (CnaG)	Eamonn Duggan (CnaG)
8th	1933	James Kelly (FF)	Robert Davitt (CnaG)	Matthew O'Reilly (FF)
9th	1937	Constituency abolished. See Meath–Westmeath		

Dáil	Election	Deputy (Party)	Deputy (Party)	Deputy (Party)	Deputy (Party)	Deputy (Party)
13th	1948	Matthew O'Reilly (FF)	Michael Hilliard (FF)	3 seats until 1977	Patrick Giles (FG)	3 seats until 1977
14th	1951	Matthew O'Reilly (FF)	Michael Hilliard (FF)	3 seats until 1977	Patrick Giles (FG)	3 seats until 1977
15th	1954	James Tully (Lab)	Michael Hilliard (FF)	3 seats until 1977	Patrick Giles (FG)	3 seats until 1977
16th	1957	James Griffin (FF)	Michael Hilliard (FF)	3 seats until 1977	Patrick Giles (FG)	3 seats until 1977
16th	1959 by-election	Henry Johnston (FF)	Michael Hilliard (FF)	3 seats until 1977	Patrick Giles (FG)	3 seats until 1977
17th	1961	James Tully (Lab)	Michael Hilliard (FF)	3 seats until 1977	Denis Farrelly (FG)	3 seats until 1977
18th	1965	James Tully (Lab)	Michael Hilliard (FF)	3 seats until 1977	Denis Farrelly (FG)	3 seats until 1977
19th	1969	James Tully (Lab)	Michael Hilliard (FF)	3 seats until 1977	John Bruton (FG)	3 seats until 1977
20th	1973	James Tully (Lab)	Brendan Crinion (FF)	3 seats until 1977	John Bruton (FG)	3 seats until 1977
21st	1977	James Tully (Lab)	Brendan Crinion (FF)	Jim Fitzsimons (FF)	John Bruton (FG)	4 seats 1977–1981
22nd	1981	James Tully (Lab)	Brendan Crinion (FF)	Jim Fitzsimons (FF)	John Bruton (FG)	John V. Farrelly (FG)
23rd	1982 (Feb)	Michael Lynch (FF)	Colm Hilliard (FF)	Jim Fitzsimons (FF)	John Bruton (FG)	John V. Farrelly (FG)
24th	1982 (Nov)	Frank McLoughlin (Lab)	Colm Hilliard (FF)	Jim Fitzsimons (FF)	John Bruton (FG)	John V. Farrelly (FG)
25th	1987	Michael Lynch (FF)	Colm Hilliard (FF)	Noel Dempsey (FF)	John Bruton (FG)	John V. Farrelly (FG)
26th	1989	Mary Wallace (FF)	Colm Hilliard (FF)	Noel Dempsey (FF)	John Bruton (FG)	John V. Farrelly (FG)
27th	1992	Mary Wallace (FF)	Colm Hilliard (FF)	Noel Dempsey (FF)	John Bruton (FG)	Brian Fitzgerald (Lab)
28th	1997	Mary Wallace (FF)	Johnny Brady (FF)	Noel Dempsey (FF)	John Bruton (FG)	John V. Farrelly (FG)
29th	2002	Mary Wallace (FF)	Johnny Brady (FF)	Noel Dempsey (FF)	John Bruton (FG)	Damien English (FG)
29th	2005 by-election	Mary Wallace (FF)	Johnny Brady (FF)	Noel Dempsey (FF)	Shane McEntee (FG)	Damien English (FG)
30th	2007	Constituency abolished. See Meath East and Meath West				
