= Alan Dukes =

Irish former politician (born 1945)

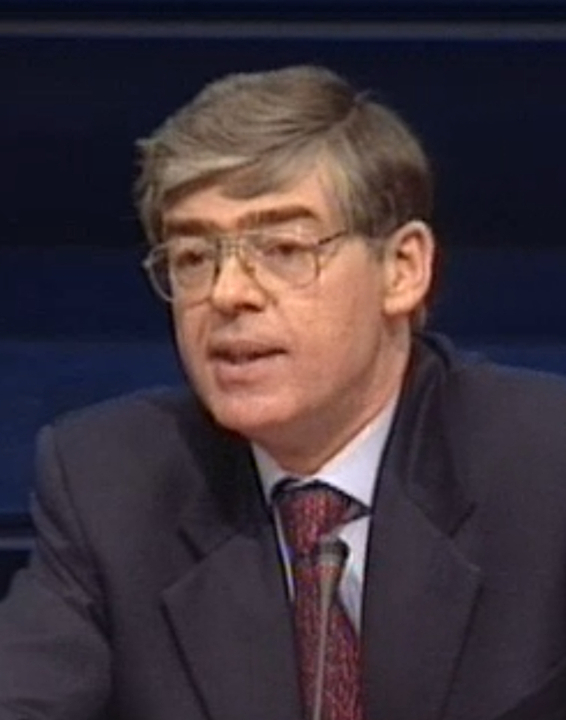
- Dukes in 1996

Minister for Transport, Energy and Communication
- In office 3 December 1996 – 26 June 1997
- Taoiseach: John Bruton
- Preceded by: Michael Lowry
- Succeeded by: Mary O'Rourke

Leader of the Opposition
- In office 10 March 1987 – 20 November 1990
- Taoiseach: Charles Haughey
- Preceded by: Charles Haughey
- Succeeded by: John Bruton

Leader of Fine Gael
- In office 10 March 1987 – 20 November 1990
- Deputy: John Bruton
- Preceded by: Garret FitzGerald
- Succeeded by: John Bruton

Minister for Justice
- In office 14 February 1986 – 10 March 1987
- Taoiseach: Garret FitzGerald
- Preceded by: Michael Noonan
- Succeeded by: Gerry Collins

Minister for Finance
- In office 14 December 1982 – 14 February 1986
- Taoiseach: Garret FitzGerald
- Preceded by: Ray MacSharry
- Succeeded by: John Bruton

Minister for Agriculture
- In office 30 June 1981 – 9 March 1982
- Taoiseach: Garret FitzGerald
- Preceded by: Ray MacSharry
- Succeeded by: Brian Lenihan

Teachta Dála
- In office June 1997 – May 2002
- Constituency: Kildare South
- In office June 1981 – June 1997
- Constituency: Kildare

Personal details
- Born: April 1945 (age 81) Drimnagh, Dublin, Ireland
- Party: Fine Gael
- Spouse: Fionnuala Corcoran (m. 1980)
- Children: 2
- Education: University College Dublin

Alan Martin Dukes (born April 1945) is an Irish former Fine Gael politician who served as Minister for Transport, Energy and Communication from 1996 to 1997, leader of the Opposition and leader of Fine Gael from 1987 to 1990, Minister for Justice from 1986 to 1987, Minister for Finance from 1982 to 1986 and Minister for Agriculture from 1981 to 1982. He served as a Teachta Dála (TD) from 1981 to 2002.

He held several senior government positions and is one of the few TDs to be appointed a minister on their first day in the Dáil. He lost his seat in the 2002 general election. He was subsequently appointed Director General of the Institute of International and European Affairs, and chairman of Anglo Irish Bank.

== Early life ==
Dukes was born in Drimnagh, Dublin, in April 1945. His father, James F. Dukes, was originally from Tralee, County Kerry, and was a senior civil servant, the founding chairman and chief executive of the Higher Education Authority, while his mother was from near Ballina, County Mayo.

The Dukes family originally came from the north of England. His grandfather had served with the Royal Engineers in World War I and settled in Cork and then Kerry afterwards where he worked with the Post Office creating Ireland's telephone network. He also developed a keen interest in the Irish language.

He was educated by the Christian Brothers at Coláiste Mhuire, Dublin, and was offered several scholarships for third level on graduation, including one for the Irish language. His interest in the Irish language continues to this day, and he regularly appears on Irish-language television programmes.

On leaving school he attended University College Dublin, where he captained the fencing team to its first-ever Intervarsity title.

== Career before politics ==
He became an economist with the Irish Farmers' Association (IFA) in Dublin in 1969. After Ireland joined the European Economic Community (EEC) in 1973, he moved to Brussels where he was part of the IFA delegation. In this role, he was influential in framing Ireland's contribution to the Common Agricultural Policy.

He was appointed as chief of staff to Ireland's EEC commissioner Dick Burke, a former Fine Gael politician.

== Early political career ==
In the 1979 European Parliament election, Dukes stood as a Fine Gael candidate in the Munster constituency. He had strong support among the farming community, but the entry of T. J. Maher, a former president of the IFA, as an independent candidate hurt his chances of election. Maher topped the poll.

He stood again for Fine Gael at the 1981 general election in the expanded Kildare constituency, where he won a seat in the 22nd Dáil. On his first day in the Dáil, he was appointed Minister for Agriculture by the Taoiseach, Garret FitzGerald, becoming one of only eight TDs so appointed. He was to represent Kildare for 21 years.

This minority Fine Gael–Labour Party coalition government collapsed in February 1982 on the budget, but returned to power with a working majority in December 1982. Dukes was again appointed to cabinet, becoming Minister for Finance less than two years into his Dáil career.

He faced a difficult task as finance minister at this time. Ireland was heavily in debt while unemployment and emigration were high. Many of Fine Gael's plans were deferred while the Fine Gael–Labour Party coalition disagreed on how to solve the economic crisis. The challenge of addressing the national finances was made difficult by electoral arithmetic and a lack of support from the opposition Fianna Fáil party led by Charles Haughey.

Dukes remained in the Department of Finance until a reshuffle in February 1986 when he was appointed as Minister for Justice.

== Leadership of Fine Gael ==
Fine Gael failed to be returned to government at the 1987 general election and lost 19 of its 70 seats, mostly to the new Progressive Democrats. Outgoing Taoiseach and leader Garret FitzGerald stepped down and Dukes was elected leader of Fine Gael, becoming leader of the Opposition.

This was a difficult time for the country. Haughey's Fianna Fáil had fought the election on promises to increase spending and government services, and by attacking the cutbacks favoured by Fine Gael. The campaign produced the famous Fianna Fáil slogan that cuts in health spending affect the "old, the sick and the handicapped". However, on taking office, the new Taoiseach and his finance minister Ray MacSharry immediately drew up a set of cutbacks including a spate of ward and hospital closures. This presented a political opportunity for the opposition to attack the government.

However, while addressing a meeting of the Tallaght Chamber of Commerce, Dukes announced, in what became known as the Tallaght Strategy that:

When the government is moving in the right direction, I will not oppose the central thrust of its policy. If it is going in the right direction, I do not believe that it should be deviated from its course, or tripped up on macro-economic issues.

This represented a major departure in Irish politics whereby Fine Gael would vote with the minority Fianna Fáil Government if it adopted Fine Gael's economic policies for revitalising the economy.

The consequences of this statement were huge. The Haughey government was able to take severe corrective steps to restructure the economy and lay the foundations for the economic boom of the nineties. However, at a snap election in 1989 Dukes did not receive electoral credit for this approach, and the party only made minor gains, gaining four seats. The outcome was the first-ever coalition government for Fianna Fáil, whose junior partner was the Progressive Democrats led by former Fianna Fáil TD Desmond O'Malley.

== 1990 presidential election and loss of the leadership ==
The party's failure to make significant gains in 1989 left some Fine Gael TDs with a desire for a change at the top of the party. Their opportunity came in the wake of the historic 1990 presidential election. Fine Gael chose Austin Currie TD as their candidate. He had been a leading member of the Northern Ireland Civil Rights Association movement in the 1960s and had been a member of the Social Democratic and Labour Party (SDLP) before moving south.

Initially, Fianna Fáil's Brian Lenihan Snr was the favourite to win. However, after several controversies arose, relating to the brief Fianna Fáil administration of 1982, and Lenihan's dismissal as Minister for Defence midway through the campaign, the Labour Party's Mary Robinson emerged victorious. To many in Fine Gael, the humiliation of finishing third was too much to bear and a campaign was launched against Dukes' leadership. He was subsequently replaced as party leader by John Bruton.

== Rainbow Coalition ==
Bruton brought him back to the front bench in September 1992, shortly before the November 1992 general election. In February 1994, Dukes became involved in a failed attempt to oust Bruton as leader and subsequently resigned from the front bench. Bruton became Taoiseach in December 1994. Dukes was not appointed to cabinet at the formation of the government.

In December 1996, Dukes returned as Minister for Transport, Energy and Communications following the resignation of Michael Lowry. At the 1997 general election, Dukes topped the poll in the new Kildare South constituency, but Fine Gael lost office. He became Chairman of the Irish Council of the European Movement; in this position, he was very involved in advising many of the Eastern European countries who were then applying to join the European Union.

In 2001, he backed Michael Noonan in his successful bid to become leader of Fine Gael.

== Career post-politics ==
After 21 years, Dukes lost his Dáil seat at the 2002 general election. This contest saw many high-profile casualties for Fine Gael, including Deputy Leader Jim Mitchell, former deputy leader Nora Owen and others. Many local commentators felt that Dukes's loss was down to a lack of attention to local issues, for he was highly involved in European projects and had always enjoyed a national profile.

He retired from frontline politics that year and was subsequently appointed Director General of the Institute of International and European Affairs. He remained active within Fine Gael and served several terms as the party's vice-president.

From 2001 to 2011, Dukes was President of the Alliance Française in Dublin, and in June 2004, the French Government appointed him an Officer of the Legion of Honour.

In April 2004, Dukes was awarded the Commander's Cross of the Order of Merit of the Republic of Poland.

In December 2008, he was appointed by Finance Minister Brian Lenihan Jnr as a public interest director on the board of Anglo Irish Bank. The bank was subsequently nationalised, and he served on the board until the IBRC was liquidated in 2013.

In January 2009, Dukes was a judge on the TG4 reality TV show Feirm Factor.

From 2011 to 2013, Dukes served as chairman of the Board of Irish Guide Dogs for the Blind. In 2011, Dukes founded the think tank Asia Matters, which inked an agreement with the Chinese People's Association for Friendship with Foreign Countries in May 2019.

Dukes receives annual pension payments of €129,805.

== Personal life ==
Dukes has lived in Kildare Town since first being elected to represent the constituency in 1981. His wife Fionnuala (née Corcoran) is a former local politician and served as a member of Kildare County Council from 1999 until her retirement in 2009. She served as Cathaoirleach of the council from 2006 to 2007, becoming only the second woman to hold the position in the body's hundred-year history. They have two daughters.

Political offices
Preceded by Ray MacSharry	Minister for Agriculture; 1981–1982	Succeeded by Brian Lenihan
Preceded by Ray MacSharry	Minister for Finance; 1982–1986	Succeeded by John Bruton
Preceded by Michael Noonan	Minister for Justice; 1986–1987	Succeeded by Gerry Collins
Preceded by Michael Lowry	Minister for Transport, Energy and Communications; 1996–1997	Succeeded by Mary O'Rourke
Party political offices
Preceded by Garret FitzGerald	Leader of Fine Gael; 1987–1990	Succeeded by John Bruton
Preceded by Garret FitzGerald	Leader of the Opposition; 1987–1990	Succeeded by John Bruton

Dáil	Election	Deputy (Party)	Deputy (Party)	Deputy (Party)
4th	1923	Hugh Colohan (Lab)	John Conlan (FP)	George Wolfe (CnaG)
5th	1927 (Jun)	Hugh Colohan (Lab)	Domhnall Ua Buachalla (FF)	George Wolfe (CnaG)
6th	1927 (Sep)	Hugh Colohan (Lab)	Domhnall Ua Buachalla (FF)	George Wolfe (CnaG)
6th	1931 by-election	Thomas Harris (FF)	Domhnall Ua Buachalla (FF)	George Wolfe (CnaG)
7th	1932	Thomas Harris (FF)	William Norton (Lab)	Sydney Minch (CnaG)
8th	1933	Thomas Harris (FF)	William Norton (Lab)	Sydney Minch (CnaG)
9th	1937	Constituency abolished. See Carlow–Kildare		

Dáil	Election	Deputy (Party)	Deputy (Party)	Deputy (Party)	Deputy (Party)	Deputy (Party)
13th	1948	William Norton (Lab)	Thomas Harris (FF)	Gerard Sweetman (FG)	3 seats until 1961	3 seats until 1961
14th	1951	William Norton (Lab)	Thomas Harris (FF)	Gerard Sweetman (FG)	3 seats until 1961	3 seats until 1961
15th	1954	William Norton (Lab)	Thomas Harris (FF)	Gerard Sweetman (FG)	3 seats until 1961	3 seats until 1961
16th	1957	William Norton (Lab)	Patrick Dooley (FF)	Gerard Sweetman (FG)	3 seats until 1961	3 seats until 1961
17th	1961	William Norton (Lab)	Patrick Dooley (FF)	Gerard Sweetman (FG)	Brendan Crinion (FF)	4 seats 1961–1969
17th	1964 by-election	Terence Boylan (FF)	Patrick Dooley (FF)	Gerard Sweetman (FG)	Brendan Crinion (FF)	4 seats 1961–1969
18th	1965	Terence Boylan (FF)	Patrick Norton (Lab)	Gerard Sweetman (FG)	Brendan Crinion (FF)	4 seats 1961–1969
19th	1969	Terence Boylan (FF)	Paddy Power (FF)	Gerard Sweetman (FG)	3 seats 1969–1981	3 seats 1969–1981
19th	1970 by-election	Terence Boylan (FF)	Paddy Power (FF)	Patrick Malone (FG)	3 seats 1969–1981	3 seats 1969–1981
20th	1973	Joseph Bermingham (Lab)	Paddy Power (FF)	Patrick Malone (FG)	3 seats 1969–1981	3 seats 1969–1981
21st	1977	Joseph Bermingham (Lab)	Paddy Power (FF)	Charlie McCreevy (FF)	3 seats 1969–1981	3 seats 1969–1981
22nd	1981	Joseph Bermingham (Lab)	Paddy Power (FF)	Charlie McCreevy (FF)	Bernard Durkan (FG)	Alan Dukes (FG)
23rd	1982 (Feb)	Joseph Bermingham (Lab)	Paddy Power (FF)	Charlie McCreevy (FF)	Gerry Brady (FF)	Alan Dukes (FG)
24th	1982 (Nov)	Joseph Bermingham (Lab)	Paddy Power (FF)	Charlie McCreevy (FF)	Bernard Durkan (FG)	Alan Dukes (FG)
25th	1987	Emmet Stagg (Lab)	Paddy Power (FF)	Charlie McCreevy (FF)	Bernard Durkan (FG)	Alan Dukes (FG)
26th	1989	Emmet Stagg (Lab)	Seán Power (FF)	Charlie McCreevy (FF)	Bernard Durkan (FG)	Alan Dukes (FG)
27th	1992	Emmet Stagg (Lab)	Seán Power (FF)	Charlie McCreevy (FF)	Bernard Durkan (FG)	Alan Dukes (FG)
28th	1997	Constituency abolished. See Kildare North and Kildare South				

Dáil	Election	Deputy (Party)	Deputy (Party)	Deputy (Party)	Deputy (Party)
28th	1997	Jack Wall (Lab)	Alan Dukes (FG)	Seán Power (FF)	3 seats 1997–2020
29th	2002	Jack Wall (Lab)	Seán Ó Fearghaíl (FF)	Seán Power (FF)	3 seats 1997–2020
30th	2007	Jack Wall (Lab)	Seán Ó Fearghaíl (FF)	Seán Power (FF)	3 seats 1997–2020
31st	2011	Jack Wall (Lab)	Seán Ó Fearghaíl (FF)	Martin Heydon (FG)	3 seats 1997–2020
32nd	2016	Fiona O'Loughlin (FF)	Seán Ó Fearghaíl (FF)	Martin Heydon (FG)	3 seats 1997–2020
33rd	2020	Cathal Berry (Ind.)	Seán Ó Fearghaíl (FF)	Martin Heydon (FG)	Patricia Ryan (SF)
34th	2024	Mark Wall (Lab)	Seán Ó Fearghaíl (FF)	Martin Heydon (FG)	Shónagh Ní Raghallaigh (SF)
