= Government of the 26th Dáil =

Governments of Ireland 1989 to 1993

There were two governments of the 26th Dáil elected at the 1989 general election on 15 June 1989, both being coalition governments of Fianna Fáil and the Progressive Democrats. The 21st government of Ireland (12 July 1989 – 11 February 1992) was led by Charles Haughey as Taoiseach and lasted 2 years, 214 days. The 22nd government of Ireland (11 February 1992 – 12 January 1993) was led by Albert Reynolds as Taoiseach and lasted 307 days from its appointment until resignation, and continued to carry out its duties for a further 29 days until the appointment of its successor, giving a total of 336 days.

== 21st government of Ireland ==
21st government of Ireland
- Government of Ireland
- Date formed: 12 July 1989
- Date dissolved: 11 February 1992

People and organisations
- President: Patrick Hillery (1989–1990); Mary Robinson (1990–1992)
- Taoiseach: Charles Haughey
- Tánaiste: Brian Lenihan Snr (1989–1990); John Wilson (1990–1992)
- Total no. of members: 15
- Member parties: Fianna Fáil; Progressive Democrats
- Status in legislature: Coalition
- Opposition party: Fine Gael
- Opposition leader: Alan Dukes (1989–1990); John Bruton (1990–1992)

History
- Election: 1989 general election
- Legislature terms: 26th Dáil; 19th Seanad
- Predecessor: 20th government
- Successor: 22nd government

=== Nomination of Taoiseach ===
The 26th Dáil first met on 26 June 1989. In the debate on the nomination of Taoiseach, Fianna Fáil leader and outgoing Taoiseach Charles Haughey, Fine Gael leader Alan Dukes, and Labour Party leader Dick Spring were each proposed. Each of these proposals were lost: Haughey received 78 votes with 86 votes against, Dukes received 61 votes with 103 votes against, and Spring received 24 votes with 138 votes against. Haughey resigned as Taoiseach, continuing to serve in a caretaker capacity.

The Dáil met again on 3 July and on 6 July, but no vote was taken on the nomination of the Taoiseach. On 12 July, Fianna Fáil and Progressive Democrats had agreed to form a coalition government, the 21st government of Ireland (12 July 1989 – 11 February 1992). The same three leaders were proposed again for the nomination of the Dáil for appointment by the president to be Taoiseach. On this occasion, the nomination of Haughey was carried by the Dáil with 84 votes in favour and 79 against.

12 July 1989; Nomination of Charles Haughey (FF) as Taoiseach; Motion proposed by Brian Lenihan and seconded by Gerry Collins; Absolute majority: 84/166
Vote	Parties	Votes
Yes	Fianna Fáil (77), Progressive Democrats (6), Independent (1)	84 / 166
No	Fine Gael (55), Labour Party (15), Workers' Party (7), Democratic Socialist Party (1), Independent (1)	79 / 166
Not voting	Green Party (1), Independent Fianna Fáil (1), Ceann Comhairle (1)	3 / 166

=== Government ministers ===
After his appointment as Taoiseach by the president, Haughey proposed the members of the government on 12 July and they were approved by the Dáil. They were appointed by the president on the same day.

Office	Name	Term	Party
Taoiseach	Charles Haughey	1989–1992	Fianna Fáil
Minister for the Gaeltacht	Charles Haughey	1989–1992	Fianna Fáil
Tánaiste	Brian Lenihan	1989–1990	Fianna Fáil
Minister for Defence	Brian Lenihan	1989–1990	Fianna Fáil
Minister for Agriculture and Food	Michael O'Kennedy	1989–1991	Fianna Fáil
Minister for Communications (Note: The functions of the Minister for Communications were transferred to the Minister for Tourism, Transport and Communications on 8 February 1991.)	Ray Burke	1989–1991	Fianna Fáil
Minister for Justice	Ray Burke	1989–1992	Fianna Fáil
Minister for Education	Mary O'Rourke	1989–1991	Fianna Fáil
Minister for Energy	Bobby Molloy	1989–1992	Progressive Democrats
Minister for the Environment	Pádraig Flynn	1989–1991	Fianna Fáil
Minister for Finance	Albert Reynolds	1989–1991	Fianna Fáil
Minister for Foreign Affairs	Gerry Collins	1989–1992	Fianna Fáil
Minister for Health	Rory O'Hanlon	1989–1991	Fianna Fáil
Minister for Industry and Commerce	Desmond O'Malley	1989–1992	Progressive Democrats
Minister for Labour	Bertie Ahern	1989–1991	Fianna Fáil
Minister for the Marine	John Wilson	1989–1992	Fianna Fáil
Minister for Social Welfare	Michael Woods	1989–1991	Fianna Fáil
Minister for Tourism and Transport (Note: The Department of Tourism and Transport was renamed as the Department of Tourism, Transport and Communications on 7 February 1991.)	Séamus Brennan	1989–1992	Fianna Fáil
==== Changes 31 October 1990 ==== Following the sacking of Brian Lenihan during the 1990 Presidential election.
Office	Name	Term	Party
Minister for Defence	Charles Haughey	(acting)	Fianna Fáil
==== Changes 13 November 1990 ==== Following the sacking of Brian Lenihan as Tánaiste on 31 October.
Office	Name	Term	Party
Tánaiste	John Wilson	1990–1992	Fianna Fáil
==== Changes 5 February 1991 ==== Appointment to position held by the Taoiseach in an acting capacity.
Office	Name	Term	Party
Minister for Defence	Brendan Daly	1991	Fianna Fáil
==== Changes 8 November 1991 ==== Following the sacking of Albert Reynolds and Pádraig Flynn after Reynolds challenged Charles Haughey for the leadership of Fianna Fáil.
Office	Name	Term	Party
Minister for the Environment	John Wilson	(acting)	Fianna Fáil
Minister for Finance	Charles Haughey	(acting)	Fianna Fáil
==== Changes 14 November 1991 ==== Positions of sacked ministers filled.
Office	Name	Term	Party
Minister for Agriculture and Food	Michael Woods	1991–1992	Fianna Fáil
Minister for Defence	Vincent Brady	1991–1992	Fianna Fáil
Minister for Education	Noel Davern	1991–1992	Fianna Fáil
Minister for the Environment	Rory O'Hanlon	1991–1992	Fianna Fáil
Minister for Finance	Bertie Ahern	1991–1992	Fianna Fáil
Minister for Health	Mary O'Rourke	1991–1992	Fianna Fáil
Minister for Labour	Michael O'Kennedy	1991–1992	Fianna Fáil
Minister for Social Welfare	Brendan Daly	1991–1992	Fianna Fáil

Change to Departments

=== Attorney General ===
On 12 July 1989 John L. Murray SC was re-appointed by the president as Attorney General on the nomination of the Taoiseach. Murray resigned on 25 September 1991, and Harry Whelehan SC was appointed by the president as Attorney General on the nomination of the Taoiseach.

=== Ministers of state ===
On 12 July 1989, Vincent Brady was appointed by the government on the nomination of the Taoiseach to the post of Minister of State at the Department of the Taoiseach with special responsibility as Government Chief Whip. On 19 July 1989, the government appointed the other Ministers of State on the nomination of the Taoiseach.

Name	Department(s)	Responsibility	Party
Vincent Brady	Taoiseach; Defence	Government Chief Whip	Fianna Fáil
Brendan Daly	Taoiseach; Finance	Heritage Affairs; Office of Public Works	Fianna Fáil
Máire Geoghegan-Quinn	Taoiseach	Co-ordinator of Government Policy and EC matters	Fianna Fáil
Michael J. Noonan	Marine		Fianna Fáil
Michael Smith	Industry and Commerce	Science and Technology	Fianna Fáil
Ger Connolly	Environment	Urban renewal	Fianna Fáil
Seán Calleary	Foreign Affairs	Overseas aid	Fianna Fáil
Terry Leyden	Industry and Commerce	Trade and Marketing	Fianna Fáil
Joe Walsh	Agriculture and Food	Food industry	Fianna Fáil
Pat "the Cope" Gallagher	Gaeltacht		Fianna Fáil
Denis Lyons	Tourism and Transport	Tourism	Fianna Fáil
Frank Fahey	Education	Youth and sport	Fianna Fáil
Noel Treacy	Health		Fianna Fáil
Séamus Kirk	Agriculture and Food	Horticulture	Fianna Fáil
Mary Harney	Environment	Office for the Protection of the Environment	Progressive Democrats
==== Changes 26 September 1989 ==== Frank Fahey was also appointed Minister of State at the Department of Tourism and Transport.
==== Changes 6 February 1991 ==== Following the appointment of Brendan Daly as Minister for Defence.
Name	Department(s)	Responsibility	Party
Vincent Brady	Finance	Office of Public Works (Retaining existing positions)	Fianna Fáil
Noel Treacy	Justice		Fianna Fáil
Chris Flood	Health		Fianna Fáil
==== Changes 15 November 1991 ==== Following the appointment of Vincent Brady as Minister for Defence and the sacking of Máire Geoghegan-Quinn, Noel Treacy and Michael Smith.
Name	Department(s)	Responsibility	Party
Dermot Ahern	Taoiseach; Defence	Government Chief Whip	Fianna Fáil
John O'Donoghue	Finance	Office of Public Works	Fianna Fáil
Michael P. Kitt	Taoiseach	EEC matters and Government policy	Fianna Fáil

=== Presidential election ===
From January to June 1990 Ireland held the presidency of the European Community. The 1990 Presidential election was held on 7 November. Mary Robinson won the election, defeating the Fianna Fáil candidate Brian Lenihan and the Fine Gael candidate Austin Currie. During the campaign, Lenihan was obliged to correct the record on whether he had contacted president Patrick Hillery in January 1982 to advise against the dissolution of the Dáil. Alan Dukes proposed a motion of no confidence in the government. This was debated as a motion of confidence in the Taoiseach and the government, proposed by Taoiseach Charles Haughey. It was approved by a vote of 83 to 80.

=== Challenge to leadership and aftermath ===
In October 1991, the Dáil debated a motion of confidence in the government. On 18 October, confidence in the government was approved by a vote of 84 to 81.

On 6 November 1991, Seán Power proposed a motion of no confidence in Haughey as leader of Fianna Fáil. Albert Reynolds and Pádraig Flynn, who supported the motion, were sacked from government. On 10 November, the motion was defeated.

In the reshuffle that followed, Jim McDaid was proposed as Minister for Defence on 13 November 1991, but his name was withdrawn later that day.

=== Resignation ===
In early 1992 Seán Doherty, who as Minister for Justice had taken the blame for the phone-tapping scandal of the early 1980s, claimed on RTÉ that Haughey had known and authorised it. Haughey denied this but the Progressive Democrats stated that they could no longer continue in government with Haughey as Taoiseach.

On 30 January 1992, Haughey resigned as leader of Fianna Fáil. Following a leadership election, he was succeeded by Albert Reynolds who formed the 22nd government of Ireland.

== 22nd government of Ireland ==
22nd government of Ireland
- Government of Ireland
- Date formed: 11 February 1992
- Date dissolved: 12 January 1993

People and organisations
- President: Mary Robinson
- Taoiseach: Albert Reynolds
- Tánaiste: John Wilson
- Total no. of members: 15
- Member parties: Fianna Fáil; Progressive Democrats
- Status in legislature: Coalition
- Opposition party: Fine Gael
- Opposition leader: John Bruton

History
- Legislature terms: 26th Dáil; 19th Seanad
- Predecessor: 21st government
- Successor: 23rd government

Charles Haughey resigned as leader of Fianna Fáil on 30 January, and Albert Reynolds won the party leadership election on 6 February. The 22nd government of Ireland (11 February 1992 – 12 January 1993) was formed by the Fianna Fáil and Progressive Democrats parties with Albert Reynolds as Taoiseach.

=== Nomination of Taoiseach ===
On 11 February, Albert Reynolds and John Bruton were proposed for the nomination of the Dáil for appointment by the president to be Taoiseach. The nomination of Reynolds was carried and he was appointed by the president.

11 February 1992; Nomination of Albert Reynolds (FF) as Taoiseach; Motion proposed by Charles Haughey and seconded by John Wilson; Absolute majority: 84/166
Vote	Parties	Votes
Yes	Fianna Fáil (77), Progressive Democrats (6), Independent (1)	84 / 166
No	Fine Gael (55), Labour Party (15), Workers' Party (7), Democratic Socialist Party (1), Green Party (1), Independent (1)	78 / 166
Absent or Not voting	Fine Gael (2), Independent Fianna Fáil (1), Ceann Comhairle (1)	4 / 166

=== Government ministers ===
After his appointment as Taoiseach by the president, Albert Reynolds proposed the members of the government and they were approved by the Dáil. They were appointed by the president on the same day.

Reynolds did not re-appoint Ray Burke, Mary O'Rourke and Gerry Collins, while promoting critics of Haughey like David Andrews, Séamus Brennan, and Charlie McCreevy into senior ministerial positions. Reynolds also promoted a number of younger TDs from rural constituencies like Noel Dempsey and Brian Cowen, to cabinet position. Bertie Ahern remained as Minister for Finance.

Office	Name	Term	Party
Taoiseach	Albert Reynolds	1992–1993	Fianna Fáil
Tánaiste	John Wilson	1992–1993	Fianna Fáil
Minister for Defence	John Wilson	1992–1993	Fianna Fáil
Minister for the Gaeltacht	John Wilson	1992–1993	Fianna Fáil
Minister for Agriculture and Food	Joe Walsh	1992–1993	Fianna Fáil
Minister for Education	Séamus Brennan	1992–1993	Fianna Fáil
Minister for Energy	Bobby Molloy	1992	Progressive Democrats
Minister for the Environment	Michael Smith	1992–1993	Fianna Fáil
Minister for Finance	Bertie Ahern	1992–1993	Fianna Fáil
Minister for Foreign Affairs	David Andrews	1992–1993	Fianna Fáil
Minister for Health	John O'Connell	1992–1993	Fianna Fáil
Minister for Industry and Commerce	Desmond O'Malley	1992	Progressive Democrats
Minister for Justice	Pádraig Flynn	1992–1993	Fianna Fáil
Minister for Labour	Brian Cowen	1992–1993	Fianna Fáil
Minister for the Marine	Michael Woods	1992–1993	Fianna Fáil
Minister for Social Welfare	Charlie McCreevy	1992–1993	Fianna Fáil
Minister for Tourism, Transport and Communications	Máire Geoghegan-Quinn	1992–1993	Fianna Fáil
==== Changes 4 November 1992 ==== Following the resignation of Progressive Democrats ministers.
Office	Name	Term	Party
Minister for Energy	Albert Reynolds	(acting)	Fianna Fáil
Minister for Industry and Commerce	Pádraig Flynn	1992–1993	Fianna Fáil
==== Changes 4 January 1993 ==== Following the nomination of Pádraig Flynn for the position of European Commissioner.
Office	Name	Term	Party
Minister for Justice	Máire Geoghegan-Quinn	1993	Fianna Fáil
Minister for Industry and Commerce	Bertie Ahern	1993	Fianna Fáil

=== Attorney General ===
On 12 January 1993 Harry Whelehan SC was appointed by the president as Attorney General on the nomination of the Taoiseach.

=== Ministers of state ===
On 11 February 1992, the government on the nomination of the Taoiseach appointed Noel Dempsey, TD to the post of Minister of State at the Department of the Taoiseach with special responsibility as Government Chief Whip, and Mary Harney as Minister of State at the Department of the Environment, with special responsibility for the office for the Protection of the Environment. On 13 February 1992, the government on the nomination of the Taoiseach appointed the other Ministers of State.

Name	Department(s)	Responsibility	Party
Noel Dempsey	Taoiseach; Defence	Government Chief Whip	Fianna Fáil
Mary Harney	Environment	Protection of the Environment	Progressive Democrats
Mary O'Rourke	Industry and Commerce	Trade and Marketing	Fianna Fáil
Brendan Daly	Foreign Affairs		Fianna Fáil
Pat "the Cope" Gallagher	Gaeltacht; Marine		Fianna Fáil
Noel Treacy	Finance	Office of Public Works; Central Development Committee	Fianna Fáil
Chris Flood	Health		Fianna Fáil
Liam Aylward	Education	Sport	Fianna Fáil
Liam Hyland	Agriculture and Food	Rural enterprise	Fianna Fáil
Michael Ahern	Industry and Commerce	Science and Technology	Fianna Fáil
Willie O'Dea	Justice		Fianna Fáil
Dan Wallace	Environment		Fianna Fáil
John Browne	Agriculture and Food	Food industry	Fianna Fáil
Tom Kitt	Taoiseach	Arts and Culture, Women's affairs and European affairs	Fianna Fáil
Brendan Kenneally	Tourism, Transport and Communications		Fianna Fáil
==== Change 4 November 1992 ==== Mary Harney resigned when the Progressive Democrats left government.

=== Constitutional referendums ===
The Eleventh Amendment was approved in a referendum held on 18 June 1992, allowing the state to ratify the Maastricht Treaty.

In March 1992, the Supreme Court held in the X Case that there was a right to access abortion in Ireland where there was a risk to the mother's life, including from a risk of suicide. The government responded with the Twelfth Amendment of the Constitution Bill 1992, which would have amended the Constitution to prevent a risk of suicide as a ground for an abortion. This proposal was rejected in a referendum. The Thirteenth Amendment and the Fourteenth Amendment were approved, providing respectively that the right to life of the unborn did not limit freedom to travel or to obtain information about services available outside the jurisdiction of the state. These three referendums were held on 25 November 1992, the date of the general election following the dissolution of the 26th Dáil.

=== Confidence in the government ===
A tribunal of inquiry into irregularities in the beef industry, referred to as the Beef Tribunal, was established to examine the relationship between successive Irish governments and the beef industry. Evidence at the tribunal revealed a substantial conflict of opinion between the two government party leaders. At the tribunal Desmond O'Malley severely criticised Reynolds, in his capacity as Minister for Industry and Commerce, for an export credit scheme. When Reynolds gave evidence he referred to O'Malley as "dishonest", the Progressive Democrats left the government on 4 November 1992. On 5 November 1992, Reynolds proposed a motion of confidence in the Taoiseach and the government.

5 November 1992; Confidence in the Taoiseach and the Government; Motion proposed by Albert Reynolds; Absolute majority: 84/166
Vote	Parties	Votes
Yes	Fianna Fáil (77)	77 / 166
No	Fine Gael (55), Labour Party (16), Progressive Democrats (6), Democratic Left (6), Workers' Party (1), Green Party (1), Independent Fianna Fáil (1), Independents (2)	88 / 166
Not voting	Ceann Comhairle (1)	1 / 166

Following the defeat of the motion of confidence, Reynolds sought a dissolution of the Dáil, which was granted by the Presidential Commission, and the 1992 general election was held on 25 November.

=== Resignation and succession ===
The 27th Dáil first met on 14 December 1992. The Dáil did not successfully nominate anyone for the position of Taoiseach on that day, with Albert Reynolds, John Bruton and Dick Spring being defeated. Reynolds resigned as Taoiseach but under the provisions of Article 28.11 of the Constitution, the members of the government continued to carry out their duties until their successors were appointed. The 23rd government of Ireland was formed on 12 January 1993 as a coalition between Fianna Fáil and the Labour Party, with Albert Reynolds again serving as Taoiseach.
