= 1992 Fianna Fáil leadership election =

Political party leadership election in Ireland

- 6 February 1992
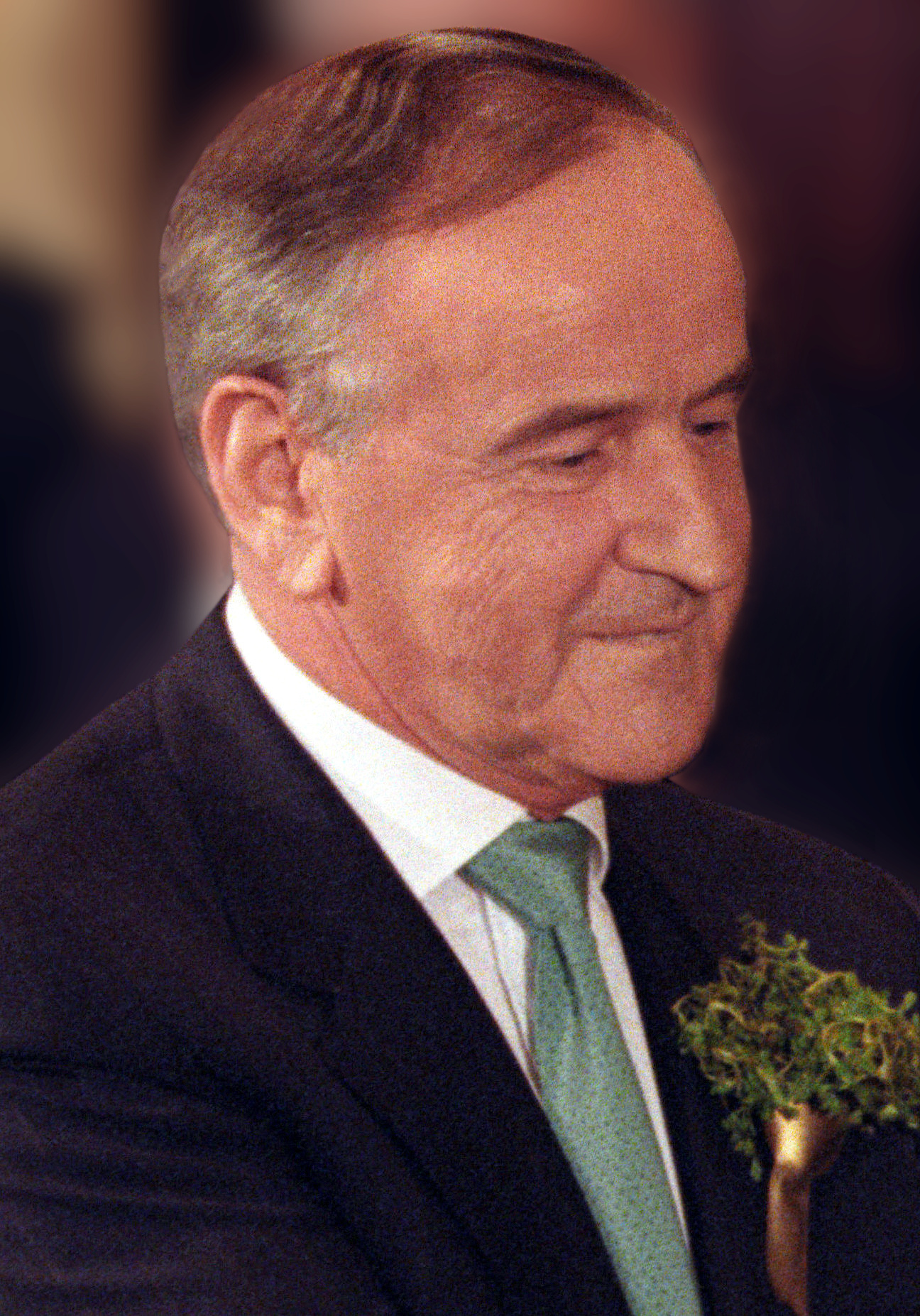

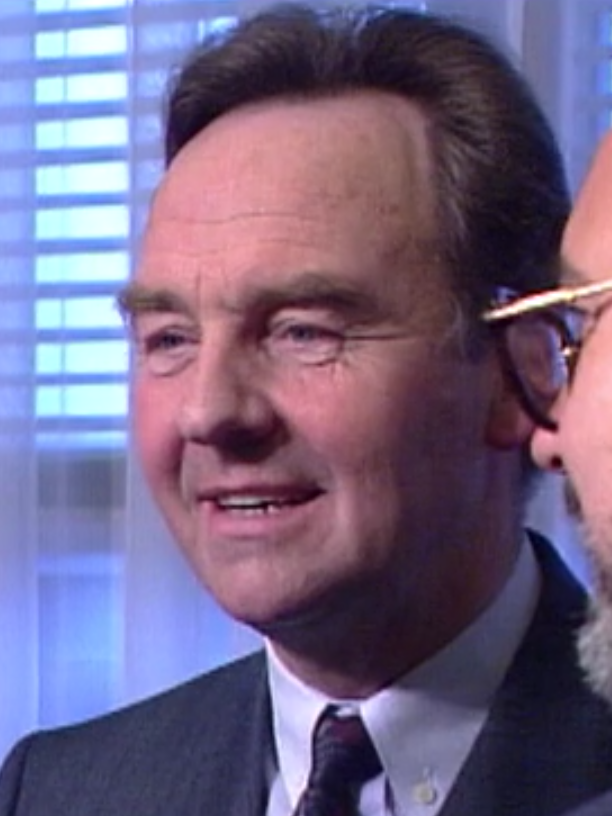

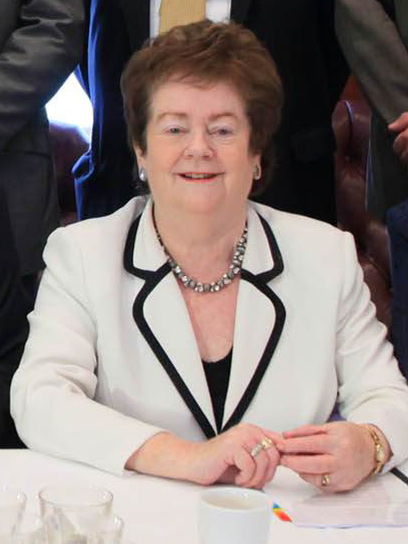
Candidate	Albert Reynolds	Michael Woods	Mary O'Rourke
Percentage	79%	13%	8%
Leader before election
Charles Haughey
Elected Leader
Albert Reynolds

The 1992 Fianna Fáil leadership election began in January 1992, when Charles Haughey resigned as party leader. Haughey had been party leader for thirteen years and had served as Taoiseach on three occasions. His successor was elected by the members of the Fianna Fáil parliamentary party on 6 February 1992. After one ballot the election was won by Albert Reynolds.

== Candidates ==
=== Standing ===
- Albert Reynolds, Former Minister for Finance
- Michael Woods, Minister for Agriculture and Food
- Mary O'Rourke, Minister for Health

=== Declined to stand ===
- Bertie Ahern, Minister for Finance
- Brian Lenihan Snr, former Tánaiste

== Campaign ==
The beginning of the end of Charles Haughey's leadership occurred in November 1991 when the Minister for Finance, Albert Reynolds, launched a leadership challenge. On that occasion the challenge failed with 22 votes for Reynolds and 55 votes for Haughey, however, it was not to be the end of the issue.

Following the leadership challenge the business of government continued and the Minister for Justice, Ray Burke, introduced the phone-tapping bill. This did not please the Cathaoirleach of Seanad Éireann, Seán Doherty, who had been dismissed from the cabinet in 1982 over his alleged involvement in the phone-tapping of journalists telephones. He considered the bill to be an affront to his character. He had always denied that he acted alone with regard to the tappings and had taken the rap in 1982. However, he was deeply unhappy that he would have to deal with the bill in the Seanad. In a television interview in early January 1992 Doherty indicated that he had not acted alone and that the phone-tappings were known by other senior members of the government. Doherty's comments were criticised by fellow politicians as bringing up old divisions. On 21 January 1992 he called a press conference in which he stated that Charles Haughey had known fully about the phone-tappings when previously he had stated the opposite. Haughey called his own press conference denying the claims, however, his partners in government, the Progressive Democrats, indicated that they would have to withdraw from the government as there was no way they could continue with Haughey as Taoiseach. Haughey told them that this was not necessary as he had decided to stand down as leader of Fianna Fáil and Taoiseach.

On 30 January, Haughey announced his resignation to the Fianna Fáil parliamentary party. Albert Reynolds, the sacked Minister for Finance, immediately threw his hat into the ring. Haughey had wanted Bertie Ahern to stand for the leadership, however, he declined. Michael Woods and Mary O'Rourke also stood for the leadership.

== Result ==
At the meeting of the Fianna Fáil parliamentary party on 6 February 1992 the following votes were cast:

Election: 6 February 1992
Candidate	Votes	%
Albert Reynolds	61	79%
Michael Woods	10	13%
Mary O'Rourke	6	8%
Turnout	77	100%
Result: Reynolds elected leader

== Aftermath ==
On 11 February, Reynolds was nominated as Taoiseach by the Dáil and formed the 22nd Government of Ireland.
