= Mary O'Rourke =

Irish politician (1937–2024)

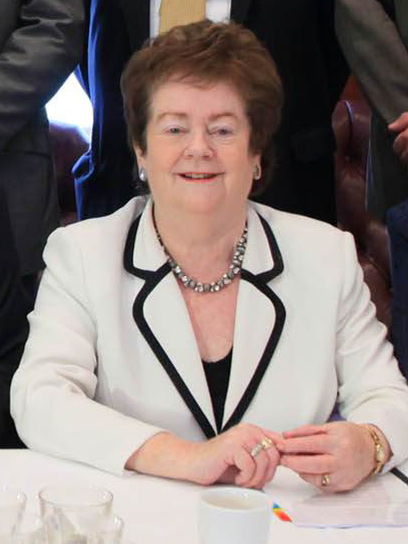
- O'Rourke in 2009

Leader of the Seanad
- In office 1 September 2002 – 25 July 2007
- Taoiseach: Bertie Ahern
- Preceded by: Donie Cassidy
- Succeeded by: Donie Cassidy

Leader of Fianna Fáil in the Seanad
- In office 1 September 2002 – 25 July 2007
- Leader: Bertie Ahern
- Preceded by: Donie Cassidy
- Succeeded by: Donie Cassidy

Deputy leader of Fianna Fáil
- In office 20 November 1994 – 7 July 2002
- Leader: Bertie Ahern
- Preceded by: Bertie Ahern
- Succeeded by: Brian Cowen

Minister for Public Enterprise
- In office 26 June 1997 – 6 June 2002
- Taoiseach: Bertie Ahern
- Preceded by: Alan Dukes (Transport, Energy and Communications)
- Succeeded by: Séamus Brennan (Transport)

Minister for Health
- In office 14 November 1991 – 11 February 1992
- Taoiseach: Charles Haughey
- Preceded by: Rory O'Hanlon
- Succeeded by: John O'Connell

Minister for Education
- In office 10 March 1987 – 14 November 1991
- Taoiseach: Charles Haughey
- Preceded by: Patrick Cooney
- Succeeded by: Noel Davern

Minister of State
- 1993–1994: Enterprise and Employment
- 1992–1993: Industry and Commerce

Teachta Dála
- In office May 2007 – February 2011
- Constituency: Longford–Westmeath
- In office November 1992 – May 2002
- Constituency: Westmeath
- In office November 1982 – November 1992
- Constituency: Longford–Westmeath

Senator
- In office 22 May 2002 – 24 May 2007
- Constituency: Nominated by the Taoiseach
- In office 8 October 1981 – 24 November 1982
- Constituency: Cultural and Educational Panel

Personal details
- Born: Mary Lenihan; 31 May 1937 Athlone, County Westmeath, Ireland
- Died: 3 October 2024 (aged 87) Deansgrange, Dublin, Ireland
- Party: Fianna Fáil
- Spouse: Enda O'Rourke (m. 1962; died 2001)
- Children: 2, including Feargal
- Parent: Patrick Lenihan (father)
- Relatives: Brian Lenihan Snr (brother); Brian Lenihan Jnr (nephew); Conor Lenihan (nephew)
- Education: University College Dublin; St Patrick's College, Maynooth

Mary O'Rourke (née Lenihan; 31 May 1937 – 3 October 2024) was an Irish Fianna Fáil politician who served as Leader of the Seanad and Leader of Fianna Fáil in the Seanad from 2002 to 2007, Deputy leader of Fianna Fáil from 1994 to 2002, Minister for Public Enterprise from 1997 to 2002, Minister for Health from 1991 to 1992 and Minister for Education from 1987 to 1991. She also served as a Minister of State from 1992 to 1994. She served as a Teachta Dála (TD) from 1982 to 2002 and 2007 to 2011. She served as a Senator for the Cultural and Educational Panel from 1981 to 1982 and from 2002 to 2007, after being nominated by the Taoiseach.

== Early life and education ==
O'Rourke was born in Athlone, County Westmeath on 31 May 1937. She came from a strong political family, her father Patrick Lenihan served as a TD for Longford–Westmeath from 1965 to 1970. Her brother Brian Lenihan was a senior government minister and Tánaiste. Another brother Paddy Lenihan was a county councillor in Roscommon but resigned from Fianna Fáil in 1983 and became associated with Neil Blaney's Independent Fianna Fáil party. Two of her nephews, Brian Lenihan Jnr and Conor Lenihan, both sons of her brother Brian, served as ministers. Brian Lenihan Jnr was the Minister for Finance. Conor Lenihan was a Minister of State.

She was educated at St. Peter's, Athlone; Loreto Bray Convent, County Wicklow; University College Dublin and St Patrick's College, Maynooth. She worked as a secondary school teacher before she began her political career.

== Political career ==
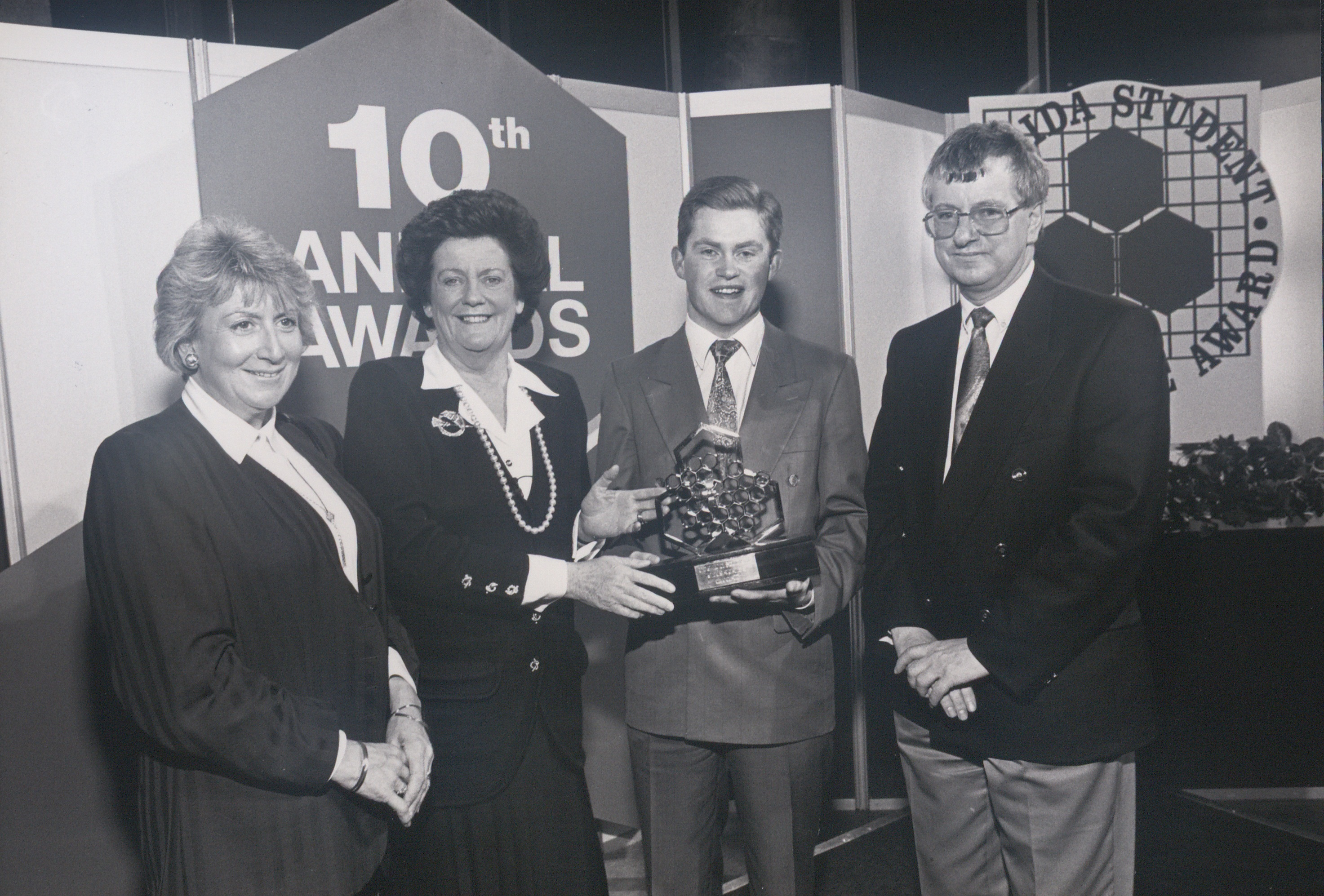
O'Rourke at the IDA Student Enterprise Awards

O'Rourke began her political career in local politics, serving on Athlone Urban District Council between 1974 and 1987 and on Westmeath County Council between 1979 and 1987. She was elected to Seanad Éireann in 1981 as a Senator for the Cultural and Educational Panel. She stood unsuccessfully for the Dáil at the February 1982 general election but was subsequently re-elected to the Seanad. At the November 1982 general election, she was first elected to Dáil Éireann as a Fianna Fáil TD for the Longford–Westmeath constituency, and from 1992 for the new Westmeath constituency.

=== Ministerial office ===
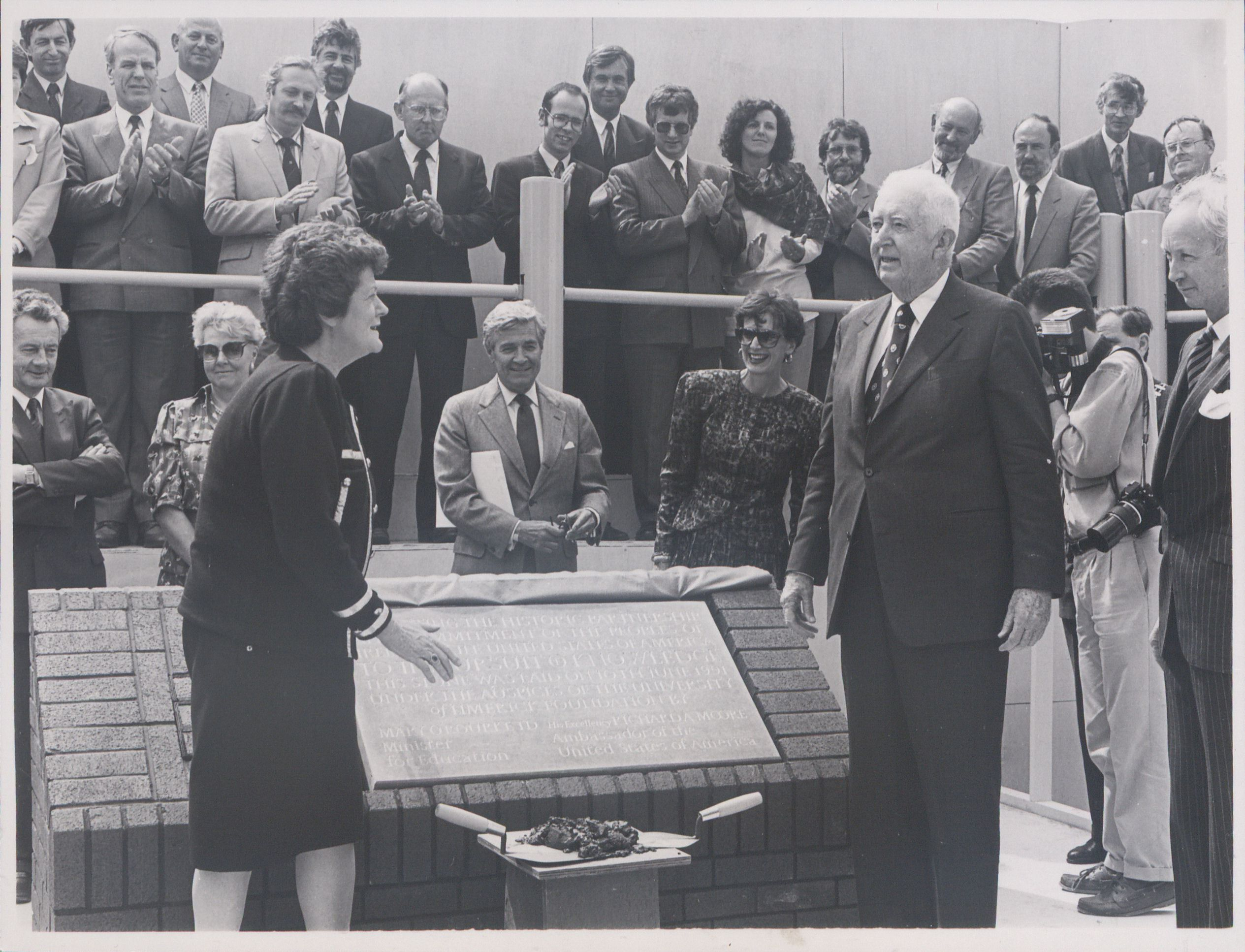
O'Rourke at the University of Limerick in 1991

In 1987, she was appointed Minister for Education by Charles Haughey. O'Rourke and her brother, Brian Lenihan, became the first siblings in Irish history to serve in the same cabinet. In November 1991 cabinet reshuffle, O'Rourke became Minister for Health. In February 1992, Charles Haughey resigned as Taoiseach and Fianna Fáil leader. O'Rourke contested the subsequent leadership election along with Michael Woods and Albert Reynolds. Reynolds defeated the other two contenders and O'Rourke was subsequently dropped from her ministerial position but was appointed to a junior ministry as Minister of State at the Department of Industry and Commerce with responsibility for Trade and Marketing. In January 1993, she was appointed as Minister of State at the Department of Enterprise and Employment with responsibility for Labour Affairs, serving until the fall of the Reynolds government in December 1994.

=== Deputy leader of Fianna Fáil ===
In 1994, Bertie Ahern became party leader and he appointed O'Rourke as deputy leader of Fianna Fáil, serving in the position until 2002. Following Ahern's election as Taoiseach in June 1997, O'Rourke became Minister for Public Enterprise, holding this position until she lost her Dáil seat at the 2002 general election. This followed a vote management strategy from Fianna Fáil head office which restricted her from campaigning in her traditional areas around Kilbeggan, in an attempt to win 2 of the 3 seats in Westmeath. The loss of her Dáil seat has also been attributed to her association with and the championing of, the privatisation of Telecom Éireann, which proved a financial disaster for many small investors, due to the share price falling radically, after privatisation. Following the loss of her Dáil seat, she was nominated to Seanad Éireann as a Senator by Taoiseach Bertie Ahern where she became Leader of the Seanad and leader of Fianna Fáil in the Seanad.

In January 2006, O'Rourke received the party nomination to stand at the 2007 general election. She narrowly defeated her nearest rival and Dáil election running mate, Kevin "Boxer" Moran of Athlone Town Council, causing a controversy when she thanked her election team for working "like blacks." In May 2007, she was re-elected to the Dáil at the 2007 general election, with her highest ever vote.

In November 2008, during a march against the re-introduction of college fees, students from the Athlone Institute of Technology laid a funeral wreath at the door of O'Rourke's constituency office. The card on the wreath stated "Sincere sympathies on the death of free fees. We will remember this." O'Rourke described the act as "heinous". The wreath was placed there because O'Rourke was not speaking at a rally against the fees.

In July 2010, O'Rourke conceded that she did not expect the party to be in power after the next general election. On RTÉ Radio's Today with Pat Kenny programme, O'Rourke said the government was making tough decisions to steer the country through the financial crisis and this would make it easy for the opposition. She said there was a general air of "crossness" within the Fianna Fáil party over their standing in the polls, but nobody was harbouring leadership ambitions to challenge Brian Cowen.

O'Rourke in November 2010 said there was then more to unite her party and Fine Gael than to divide them. She pointed to the common approach of the two parties to Northern Ireland, Europe and the current financial crisis. In an address to the 1916–1921 Club in Dublin Castle, she said that most voters no longer defined themselves in terms of Civil War politics. Having pointed to the shared values of the two parties on several issues, she said the last issue she wanted to mention was the "dreaded b" word.

Her senior years led her to often being referred to as the "Mammy of the Dáil".

She contested the 2011 general election but was defeated. O'Rourke criticised former Taoiseach Brian Cowen, saying that he should have resigned after his infamous "congested" radio interview. She supported the attack on Cowen by her nephew, former Finance Minister Brian Lenihan, who said he was "disappointed" by Cowen's performance and he had to provide the leadership when the Taoiseach did not.

In retirement, she received a lump sum of €237,000 and an annual pension of €97,000.

== Other activities ==
As well as being a well-known politician, O'Rourke made regular appearances in the media in a non-political capacity. She was a contestant on RTÉ's reality series Celebrity Bainisteoir, as well as other shows such as Sex & Sensibility. She guest presented Tonight with Vincent Browne.

In 2012, Just Mary: My Memoir was published. It won the 2012 Irish Book Award in the "Listeners' Choice" category.

== Personal life and death ==
She married Enda O'Rourke in 1962, and they had two sons. One of them, Aengus O'Rourke, has been a member of Westmeath County Council since 2014. The other, Feargal O'Rourke, became Managing Partner of PriceWaterHouseCoopers in Ireland in 2015 and is considered the "grand architect" of the double Irish tax system, a major contributor to Ireland's economic success in attracting US multinationals to Ireland.

Her husband Enda died in January 2001. O'Rourke died in Deansgrange, Dublin on 3 October 2024, at the age of 87.

In May 2026, the Taoiseach Micheál Martin renamed the Athlone Greenway Bridge after O'Rourke.

== See also ==
- Families in the Oireachtas

Political offices
Preceded by Patrick Cooney	Minister for Education; 1987–1991	Succeeded by Noel Davern
Preceded by Rory O'Hanlon	Minister for Health; 1991–1992	Succeeded by John O'Connell
Preceded by Terry Leyden; Michael Smith	Minister of State at the Department of Industry and Commerce; 1992–1993; With: Michael Ahern	Succeeded by Herself as Minister of State at the Department of Enterprise and Employment
Preceded by Herself as Minister of State at the Department of Industry and Commerce	Minister of State at the Department of Enterprise and Employment; 1993–1994; With: Séamus Brennan	Succeeded by Eithne Fitzgerald; Pat Rabbitte
Preceded by Alan Dukes as Minister for Transport, Energy and Communications	Minister for Public Enterprise; 1997–2002	Succeeded by Séamus Brennan as Minister for Transport
Preceded by Donie Cassidy	Leader of the Seanad; 2002–2007	Succeeded by Donie Cassidy
Party political offices
Preceded by Bertie Ahern	Deputy leader of Fianna Fáil; 1995–2002	Succeeded by Brian Cowen

Dáil	Election	Deputy (Party)	Deputy (Party)	Deputy (Party)
27th	1992	Willie Penrose (Lab)	Mary O'Rourke (FF)	Paul McGrath (FG)
28th	1997	Willie Penrose (Lab)	Mary O'Rourke (FF)	Paul McGrath (FG)
29th	2002	Willie Penrose (Lab)	Donie Cassidy (FF)	Paul McGrath (FG)
30th	2007	Constituency abolished. See Longford–Westmeath		

Dáil	Election	Deputy (Party)	Deputy (Party)	Deputy (Party)	Deputy (Party)	Deputy (Party)
2nd	1921	Lorcan Robbins (SF)	Seán Mac Eoin (SF)	Joseph McGuinness (SF)	Laurence Ginnell (SF)	4 seats 1921–1923
3rd	1922	John Lyons (Lab)	Seán Mac Eoin (PT-SF)	Francis McGuinness (PT-SF)	Laurence Ginnell (AT-SF)	4 seats 1921–1923
4th	1923	John Lyons (Ind.)	Conor Byrne (Rep)	James Killane (Rep)	Patrick Shaw (CnaG)	Patrick McKenna (FP)
5th	1927 (Jun)	Henry Broderick (Lab)	Michael Kennedy (FF)	James Victory (FF)	Patrick Shaw (CnaG)	Hugh Garahan (FP)
6th	1927 (Sep)	Henry Broderick (Lab)	Michael Kennedy (FF)	James Killane (FF)	Patrick Shaw (CnaG)	Michael Connolly (CnaG)
6th	1930 by-election	Henry Broderick (Lab)	Michael Kennedy (FF)	James Geoghegan (FF)	Patrick Shaw (CnaG)	Michael Connolly (CnaG)
7th	1932	Francis Gormley (FF)	Michael Kennedy (FF)	James Geoghegan (FF)	Patrick Shaw (CnaG)	Seán Mac Eoin (CnaG)
8th	1933	James Victory (FF)	Michael Kennedy (FF)	James Geoghegan (FF)	Charles Fagan (NCP)	Seán Mac Eoin (CnaG)
9th	1937	Constituency abolished. See Athlone–Longford and Meath–Westmeath				

Dáil	Election	Deputy (Party)	Deputy (Party)	Deputy (Party)	Deputy (Party)	Deputy (Party)
13th	1948	Erskine H. Childers (FF)	Thomas Carter (FF)	Michael Kennedy (FF)	Seán Mac Eoin (FG)	Charles Fagan (Ind.)
14th	1951	Erskine H. Childers (FF)	Frank Carter (FF)	Michael Kennedy (FF)	Seán Mac Eoin (FG)	Charles Fagan (Ind.)
15th	1954	Erskine H. Childers (FF)	Frank Carter (FF)	Michael Kennedy (FF)	Seán Mac Eoin (FG)	Charles Fagan (FG)
16th	1957	Erskine H. Childers (FF)	Ruairí Ó Brádaigh (SF)	Michael Kennedy (FF)	Seán Mac Eoin (FG)	Charles Fagan (FG)
17th	1961	Frank Carter (FF)	Joe Sheridan (Ind.)	Michael Kennedy (FF)	Seán Mac Eoin (FG)	4 seats 1961–1992
18th	1965	Frank Carter (FF)	Joe Sheridan (Ind.)	Patrick Lenihan (FF)	Gerry L'Estrange (FG)	4 seats 1961–1992
19th	1969	Frank Carter (FF)	Joe Sheridan (Ind.)	Patrick Lenihan (FF)	Gerry L'Estrange (FG)	4 seats 1961–1992
19th	1970 by-election	Frank Carter (FF)	Joe Sheridan (Ind.)	Patrick Cooney (FG)	Gerry L'Estrange (FG)	4 seats 1961–1992
20th	1973	Frank Carter (FF)	Joe Sheridan (Ind.)	Patrick Cooney (FG)	Gerry L'Estrange (FG)	4 seats 1961–1992
21st	1977	Albert Reynolds (FF)	Joe Sheridan (Ind.)	Seán Keegan (FF)	Gerry L'Estrange (FG)	4 seats 1961–1992
22nd	1981	Albert Reynolds (FF)	Patrick Cooney (FG)	Seán Keegan (FF)	Gerry L'Estrange (FG)	4 seats 1961–1992
23rd	1982 (Feb)	Albert Reynolds (FF)	Patrick Cooney (FG)	Seán Keegan (FF)	Gerry L'Estrange (FG)	4 seats 1961–1992
24th	1982 (Nov)	Albert Reynolds (FF)	Patrick Cooney (FG)	Mary O'Rourke (FF)	Gerry L'Estrange (FG)	4 seats 1961–1992
25th	1987	Albert Reynolds (FF)	Patrick Cooney (FG)	Mary O'Rourke (FF)	Henry Abbott (FF)	4 seats 1961–1992
26th	1989	Albert Reynolds (FF)	Louis Belton (FG)	Mary O'Rourke (FF)	Paul McGrath (FG)	4 seats 1961–1992
27th	1992	Constituency abolished. See Longford–Roscommon and Westmeath				

Dáil	Election	Deputy (Party)	Deputy (Party)	Deputy (Party)	Deputy (Party)	Deputy (Party)
30th	2007	Willie Penrose (Lab)	Peter Kelly (FF)	Mary O'Rourke (FF)	James Bannon (FG)	4 seats 2007–2024
31st	2011	Willie Penrose (Lab)	Robert Troy (FF)	Nicky McFadden (FG)	James Bannon (FG)	4 seats 2007–2024
31st	2014 by-election	Willie Penrose (Lab)	Robert Troy (FF)	Gabrielle McFadden (FG)	James Bannon (FG)	4 seats 2007–2024
32nd	2016	Willie Penrose (Lab)	Robert Troy (FF)	Kevin "Boxer" Moran (Ind.)	Peter Burke (FG)	4 seats 2007–2024
33rd	2020	Sorca Clarke (SF)	Robert Troy (FF)	Joe Flaherty (FF)	Peter Burke (FG)	4 seats 2007–2024
34th	2024	Sorca Clarke (SF)	Robert Troy (FF)	Kevin "Boxer" Moran (Ind.)	Peter Burke (FG)	Micheál Carrigy (FG)
