= Minister for Transport (Ireland) =

Irish government cabinet minister

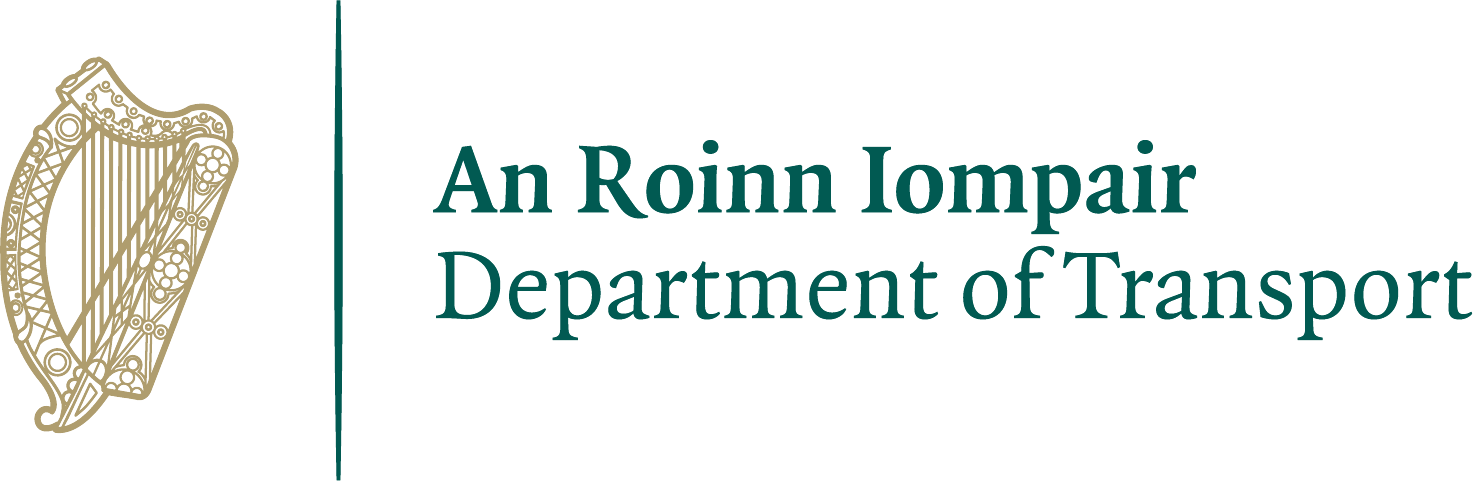

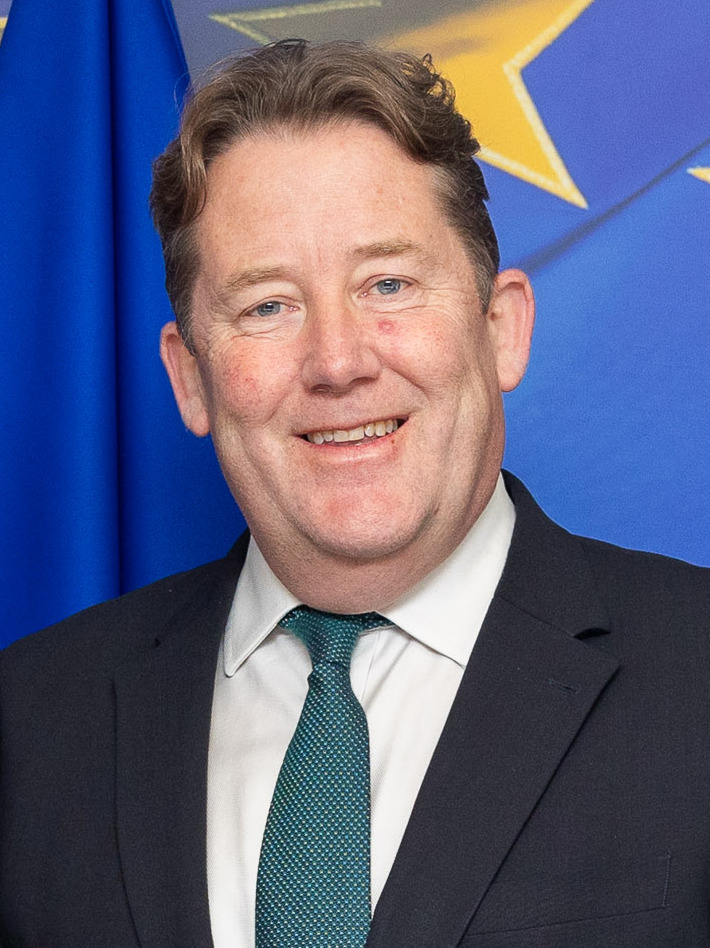
- Incumbent; Darragh O'Brien since 23 January 2025
- Department of Transport
- Type: Transport minister
- Status: Cabinet minister
- Member of: Government of Ireland; Council of the European Union; North/South Ministerial Council; Dáil Éireann
- Reports to: Taoiseach
- Seat: Dublin, Ireland
- Nominator: Taoiseach
- Appointer: President of Ireland; (on the advice of the Taoiseach)
- Inaugural holder: Erskine Childers as Minister for Transport and Power in 1959; Richie Ryan as Minister for the Public Service in 1973
- Formation: 1 November 1973
- Salary: €212,858 (2025) (including €117,113 TD salary)
- Website: Official website

The minister for transport (Irish: An tAire Iompair) is a senior minister in the Government of Ireland and leads the Department of Transport.

The minister for transport since January 2025 is Darragh O'Brien, TD. He is also Minister for Climate, Energy and the Environment.

He is assisted by two ministers of state:

- Seán Canney, TD – Minister of State at the Department of Transport with special responsibility for international and road transport and logistics.
- Jerry Buttimer, TD – Minister of State at the Department of Transport with special responsibility for rural transport

== Overview ==
The minister and the department are responsible for implementing an integrated transport policy.

The integrated policy will be designed as far as possible to overcome existing delays, bottlenecks and congestion and to provide the consumer with greater choice by offering alternative modes of transport. Through the integrated approach the Department will develop and implement policies designed to improve regional balance, and reduce rural isolation and social exclusion.

— Mission statement

Specific responsibilities which come under the aegis of the minister for transport in relation to national roads and to road transport in general include: delivering on the national roads programme as part of the national development plan; implementing the government's road safety strategy and related policies for the regulation of vehicle standards; road haulage licensing; driver licensing; and driver testing.

In respect of aviation policy, the department is responsible for ensuring that aviation practices and procedures comply with the best international standards; promoting the development of a vibrant, competitive and progressively regulated aviation sector and the provision of adequate airport infrastructure and competitive airport services.

In respect of maritime transport, the department is responsible for establishing, promoting, regulating and enforcing Maritime Safety and Security Standards, providing emergency response services and safeguarding the maritime environment. It is also responsible for ports and shipping policy.

== List of office-holders ==
The Department of Transport and Power was created by the Ministers and Secretaries (Amendment) Act 1959. On 2 January 1984, the Department of Transport was abolished under the Ministers and Secretaries (Amendment) Act 1983 and its functions transferred to the Department of Communications.

=== Minister for Transport and Power 1959–1977 ===
Name	Term of office		Party	Government
Erskine H. Childers	27 July 1959	2 July 1969	Fianna Fáil	9th • 10th • 11th • 12th
Brian Lenihan	2 July 1969	3 January 1973	Fianna Fáil	13th
Michael O'Kennedy	3 January 1973	14 March 1973	Fianna Fáil	13th
Peter Barry	14 March 1973	2 December 1976	Fine Gael	14th
Tom Fitzpatrick	2 December 1976	5 July 1977	Fine Gael	14th
=== Minister for Tourism and Transport 1977–1980 ===
Name	Term of office		Party	Government
Pádraig Faulkner	5 July 1977	11 December 1979	Fianna Fáil	15th
George Colley	12 December 1979	25 January 1980	Fianna Fáil	16th
=== Minister for Transport 1980–1984 ===
Name	Term of office		Party	Government
Albert Reynolds (Note: Also Minister for Posts and Telegraphs.)	25 January 1980	30 June 1981	Fianna Fáil	16th
Patrick Cooney	30 June 1981	9 March 1982	Fine Gael	17th
John Wilson	9 March 1982	14 December 1982	Fianna Fáil	18th
Jim Mitchell	14 December 1982	2 January 1984	Fine Gael	19th

The Department of the Public Service was created by the Ministers and Secretaries (Amendment) Act 1973. In 1987, the functions of the Department of Public Service were transferred to the Department of Finance, and the statutory shell used for the formation of the Department of Transport. The subsequent changes to the department name and functions are shown in detail at the article on the Department of Transport.

Denotes acting Minister

=== Minister for the Public Service 1973–1987 ===
Name	Term of office		Party	Government
Richie Ryan (Note: Also Minister for Finance.)	1 November 1973	5 July 1977	Fine Gael	14th
George Colley	5 July 1977	11 December 1979	Fianna Fáil	15th
Michael O'Kennedy	12 December 1979	24 March 1980	Fianna Fáil	16th
Gene Fitzgerald (1st time)	24 March 1980	30 June 1981	Fianna Fáil	16th
Liam Kavanagh (Note: Also Minister for Labour.)	30 June 1981	9 March 1982	Labour	17th
Gene Fitzgerald (2nd time)	9 March 1982	14 December 1982	Fianna Fáil	18th
John Boland	14 December 1982	14 February 1986	Fine Gael	19th
Ruairi Quinn	14 February 1986	20 January 1987	Labour	19th
John Bruton	20 January 1987	10 March 1987	Fine Gael	19th
Ray MacSharry	10 March 1987	20 March 1987	Fianna Fáil	20th
=== Minister for Tourism and Transport 1987–1991 ===
Name	Term of office		Party	Government
Ray MacSharry	20 March 1987	31 March 1987	Fianna Fáil	20th
John Wilson	31 March 1987	12 July 1989	Fianna Fáil	20th
Séamus Brennan	12 July 1989	7 February 1991	Fianna Fáil	21st
=== Minister for Tourism, Transport and Communications 1991–1993 ===
Name	Term of office		Party	Government
Séamus Brennan	7 February 1991	11 February 1992	Fianna Fáil	21st
Máire Geoghegan-Quinn	11 February 1992	12 January 1993	Fianna Fáil	22nd
Charlie McCreevy	12 January 1993	22 January 1993	Fianna Fáil	23rd
=== Minister for Transport, Energy and Communications 1993–1997 ===
Name	Term of office		Party	Government
Brian Cowen	22 January 1993	15 December 1994	Fianna Fáil	23rd
Michael Lowry	15 December 1994	30 November 1996	Fine Gael	24th
John Bruton (acting)	30 November 1996	3 December 1996	Fine Gael	24th
Alan Dukes	3 December 1996	26 June 1997	Fine Gael	24th
=== Minister for Public Enterprise 1997–2002 ===
Name	Term of office		Party	Government
Mary O'Rourke	26 June 1997	6 June 2002	Fianna Fáil	25th
=== Minister for Transport 2002–2011 ===
Name	Term of office		Party	Government
Séamus Brennan	6 June 2002	29 September 2004	Fianna Fáil	26th
Martin Cullen	29 September 2004	14 June 2007	Fianna Fáil	26th
Noel Dempsey	14 June 2007	19 January 2011	Fianna Fáil	27th • 28th
Pat Carey (Note: Also Minister for Community, Equality and Gaeltacht Affairs and (from 23 January 2011) Minister for Communications, Energy and Natural Resources.)	20 January 2011	8 March 2011	Fianna Fáil	28th
=== Minister for Transport, Tourism and Sport 2011–2020 ===
Name	Term of office		Party	Government
Leo Varadkar	9 March 2011	11 July 2014	Fine Gael	29th
Paschal Donohoe	11 July 2014	6 May 2016	Fine Gael	29th
Shane Ross	6 May 2016	27 June 2020	Independent	30th • 31st
=== Minister for Transport 2020–present ===
Name	Term of office		Party	Government
Eamon Ryan (Note: Also Minister for the Environment, Climate and Communications.)	27 June 2020	23 January 2025	Green	32nd • 33rd • 34th
Darragh O'Brien (Note: Also Minister for Climate, Energy and the Environment.)	23 January 2025	Incumbent	Fianna Fáil	35th
