= Michael O'Kennedy =

Irish politician (1936–2022)

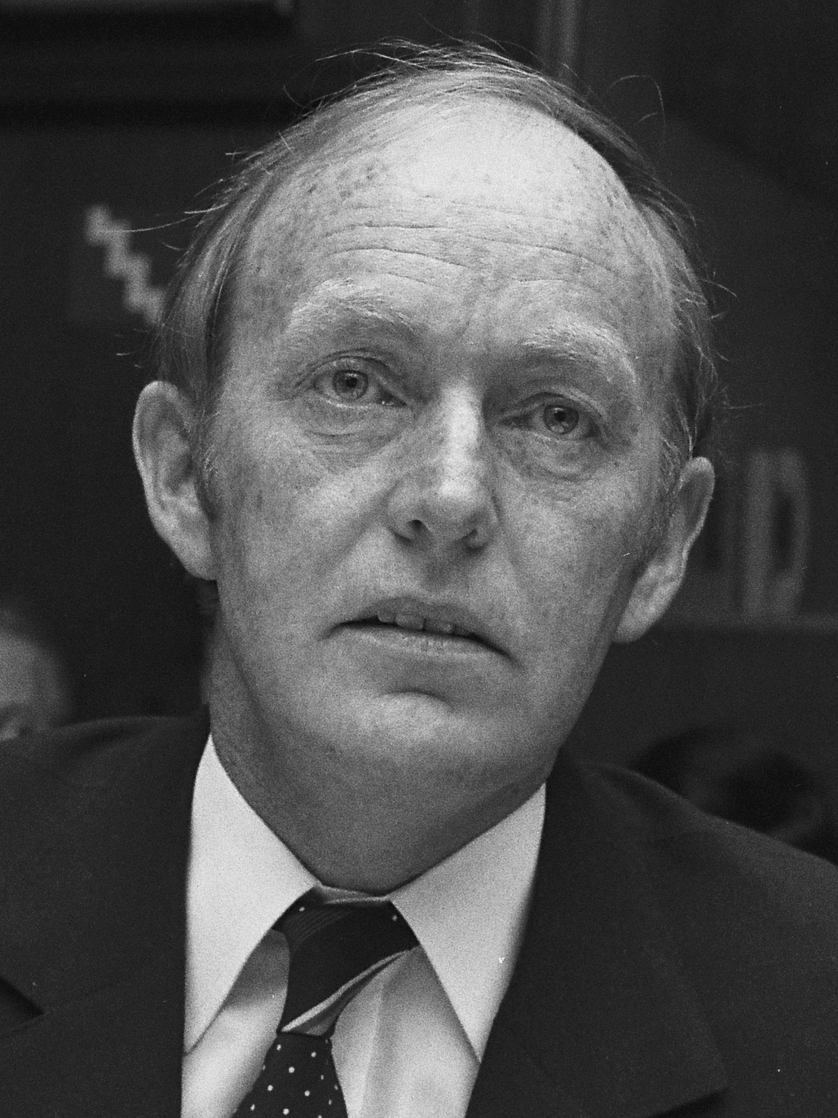
- O'Kennedy in 1979

Minister for Labour
- In office 14 November 1991 – 11 February 1992
- Taoiseach: Charles Haughey
- Preceded by: Bertie Ahern
- Succeeded by: Brian Cowen

Minister for Agriculture, Fisheries and Food
- In office 10 March 1987 – 14 November 1991
- Taoiseach: Charles Haughey
- Preceded by: Austin Deasy
- Succeeded by: Michael Woods

European Commissioner for Personnel, Administration and the Statistics Office
- In office 6 January 1981 – 5 March 1982
- President: Gaston Thorn
- Preceded by: New office
- Succeeded by: Richard Burke

Minister for Finance
- In office 12 December 1979 – 16 December 1980
- Taoiseach: Charles Haughey
- Preceded by: George Colley
- Succeeded by: Gene Fitzgerald

Minister for the Public Service
- In office 12 December 1979 – 24 March 1980
- Taoiseach: Charles Haughey
- Preceded by: George Colley
- Succeeded by: Gene Fitzgerald

Minister for Foreign Affairs
- In office 5 July 1977 – 11 December 1979
- Taoiseach: Jack Lynch
- Preceded by: Garret FitzGerald
- Succeeded by: Brian Lenihan

Minister for Transport and Power
- In office 3 January 1973 – 14 March 1973
- Taoiseach: Jack Lynch
- Preceded by: Brian Lenihan
- Succeeded by: Peter Barry

Parliamentary Secretary
- 1970–1973: Education

Teachta Dála
- In office June 1997 – April 2002
- In office February 1982 – November 1992
- In office July 1969 – 6 January 1981
- Constituency: Tipperary North

Senator
- In office 17 February 1993 – 6 June 1997
- Constituency: Administrative Panel
- In office 23 June 1965 – 18 June 1969
- Constituency: Cultural and Educational Panel

Personal details
- Born: 21 February 1936 Nenagh, County Tipperary, Ireland
- Died: 15 April 2022 (aged 86) Dublin, Ireland
- Party: Fianna Fáil
- Spouse: Breda Heavey (m. 1965)
- Children: 3
- Education: University College Dublin; King's Inns

Michael O'Kennedy (21 February 1936 – 15 April 2022) was an Irish Fianna Fáil politician who served in a range of cabinet positions, including Minister for Agriculture, Fisheries and Food, Minister for Foreign Affairs, Minister for Finance and Irish European Commissioner. He served as a Teachta Dála (TD) for the Tipperary North constituency and was also a member of Seanad Éireann.

== Early life ==
O'Kennedy was born in Nenagh, County Tipperary, into a family that had strong links to Sinn Féin and the Old IRA. He was educated locally at St. Mary's National School before later attending St Flannan's College in Ennis, County Clare. He briefly studied for the priesthood at St Patrick's College, Maynooth, where he was a contemporary of future Social Democratic and Labour Party leader John Hume. After securing first place in a university scholarship in 1953, O'Kennedy obtained an MA degree from University College Dublin. He taught in Switzerland for a while before resuming his legal studies; he was called to the Bar in 1961. Twelve years later, he was appointed Senior Counsel.

== Political career ==
=== Beginnings ===
O'Kennedy joined Fianna Fáil in 1957 and became an active party member. He contested the 1965 general election in Tipperary North; however, he narrowly failed to win a seat. He was elected to the 11th Seanad, where he became the party spokesperson on various issues, including finance and education.

O'Kennedy contested the 1969 general election and was successful in securing a seat in Dáil Éireann. He remained on the backbenches until 1970 when the Arms Crisis resulted in a major reshuffle at cabinet and junior ministerial levels. O'Kennedy became Parliamentary Secretary to the Minister for Education.

In December 1972, a cabinet reshuffle by Taoiseach Jack Lynch saw O'Kennedy join the cabinet as minister without portfolio. There was much speculation as to what portfolio he would take; however, the new year saw him become Minister for Transport and Power. His tenure was short-lived, for the 1973 general election saw a Fine Gael–Labour Party coalition government come to power.

Immediately after Fianna Fáil's loss of power, O'Kennedy was appointed Spokesperson on Foreign Affairs. He retained the same brief in a 1975 front bench reshuffle. After this reshuffle, he revealed his future leadership aspirations as he became associated with a hardline policy document regarding Northern Ireland. The paper called for a complete and immediate withdrawal of the British Government from Northern Ireland. This new policy opened up the old divisions in Fianna Fáil that had come to light during the Arms Crisis in 1970. It was also against the party's wishes and was at odds with party policy; however, O'Kennedy's new policy was welcomed by the hardline Republican element at the grassroots level within the party.

=== Cabinet minister and European commissioner ===
The 1977 general election saw Fianna Fáil return to government with a twenty-seat majority in the Dáil. O'Kennedy was appointed Minister for Foreign Affairs in Jack Lynch's new cabinet.

In 1979, Lynch resigned as Taoiseach and Fianna Fáil leader. The subsequent leadership election was a contest between George Colley and Charles Haughey. Colley was the favoured choice of the outgoing leadership and the majority of the cabinet, while Haughey had the backing of a large rump of backbench TDs who had become disillusioned with the party leadership. On the day before the crucial vote, O'Kennedy was the only cabinet minister to publicly endorse Haughey. Many believe that it was because of this support that Haughey was successful in becoming Taoiseach, albeit by a narrow margin of just six votes. O'Kennedy's loyalty was rewarded when he was appointed Minister for Finance in the new government.

O'Kennedy's tenure as Minister for Finance was short-lived, delivering a stringent budget, as he took the position of European commissioner in January 1981. Because of his new appointment in Brussels, he also resigned from his Dáil seat. O'Kennedy took over as European Commissioner for Personnel, Administration and the Statistics Office and was disappointed not to be made vice-president in the Thorn Commission. He was, however, made a delegate to the president.

O'Kennedy's tenure in the European Commission was unhappy. He quickly grew bored of the mundane day-to-day work as a commissioner and missed the cut-and-thrust nature of Irish politics, which was going through a volatile period. A general election was called for February 1982, and O'Kennedy returned to contest his old seat. He was elected for Tipperary North once again and resigned as a European commissioner. O'Kennedy's return was seen as an attempt to assert his claim to the future leadership of Fianna Fáil, something that had been a contentious issue under Haughey and his failure to secure an overall majority in two elections. Fianna Fáil returned to power with the help of several Independent TDs, and O'Kennedy demanded a senior government position. His request was refused. Haughey offered him the post of Attorney General, but O'Kennedy declined. As a result, he was left out of the short-lived administration.

The government fell in October that same year, and Fianna Fáil lost power at the subsequent general election. A period of instability followed within Fianna Fáil as several TDs attempted to oust Charles Haughey as party leader. Desmond O'Malley was seen as the clear front-runner to succeed Haughey; however, O'Kennedy's name was also mentioned alongside other party stalwarts like Gerry Collins and Brian Lenihan. In the end, Haughey survived as party leader.

=== Return to cabinet ===
Following the 1987 general election, Haughey was again Taoiseach and O'Kennedy returned to the cabinet as Minister for Agriculture and Food. This may have seemed like a demotion for someone with the experience of O'Kennedy; however, his nearly five-year tenure received praise from farming circles.

In November 1991, tensions arose within Fianna Fáil regarding the continued leadership of Haughey. Minister for Finance Albert Reynolds directly challenged the party leader and Taoiseach; however, the challenge failed. O'Kennedy supported the incumbent leader throughout the heave and took over as Minister for Labour in the subsequent reshuffle. Once again, this was viewed as a demotion; however, O'Kennedy viewed his role as one of the most important in the cabinet, considering the high unemployment rate.

In February 1992, Haughey stepped down as Taoiseach and Fianna Fáil leader, and Albert Reynolds won the subsequent leadership election by a large majority. The formation of his new cabinet caused widespread shock as O'Kennedy and seven of his cabinet colleagues were effectively sacked in favour of supporters of the new Taoiseach. This brought his cabinet career to an end.

=== Later years ===
O'Kennedy lost his seat at the 1992 general election, in what turned out to be a disaster for Fianna Fáil. He subsequently secured election to Seanad Éireann for the second time in his career.

O'Kennedy was re-elected to the Dáil at the 1997 general election. He sought the Fianna Fáil nomination in the 1997 presidential election, but received only 21 votes out of a total of 112, as Mary McAleese became the party's nominee and eventual victor of the election.

After the 2002 general election, O'Kennedy retired from national politics. He returned to work as a barrister and subsequently became a member of the Refugee Appeals Tribunal.

O'Kennedy died on 15 April 2022, aged 86.

Political offices
Preceded by Bobby Molloy	Parliamentary Secretary to the Minister for Education; 1970–1973	Succeeded by Jim Tunney
—	Minister without portfolio 1972–1973	—
Preceded by Brian Lenihan	Minister for Transport and Power; 1973	Succeeded by Peter Barry
Preceded by Garret FitzGerald	Minister for Foreign Affairs; 1977–1979	Succeeded by Brian Lenihan
Preceded by George Colley	Minister for Finance; 1979–1980	Succeeded by Gene Fitzgerald
Preceded by George Colley	Minister for the Public Service; 1979–1980	Succeeded by Gene Fitzgerald
Preceded by Richard Burke	Irish European Commissioner; 1981–1982	Succeeded by Richard Burke
Preceded by Austin Deasy	Minister for Agriculture and Food; 1987–1991	Succeeded by Joe Walsh
Preceded by Bertie Ahern	Minister for Labour; 1991–1992	Succeeded by Brian Cowen

Dáil	Election	Deputy (Party)	Deputy (Party)	Deputy (Party)
13th	1948	Patrick Kinane (CnaP)	Mary Ryan (FF)	Daniel Morrissey (FG)
14th	1951	John Fanning (FF)	Mary Ryan (FF)	Daniel Morrissey (FG)
15th	1954	John Fanning (FF)	Mary Ryan (FF)	Daniel Morrissey (FG)
16th	1957	John Fanning (FF)	Mary Ryan (FF)	Patrick Tierney (Lab)
17th	1961	John Fanning (FF)	Thomas Dunne (FG)	Patrick Tierney (Lab)
18th	1965	John Fanning (FF)	Thomas Dunne (FG)	Patrick Tierney (Lab)
19th	1969	Michael O'Kennedy (FF)	Thomas Dunne (FG)	Michael Smith (FF)
20th	1973	Michael O'Kennedy (FF)	Thomas Dunne (FG)	John Ryan (Lab)
21st	1977	Michael O'Kennedy (FF)	Michael Smith (FF)	John Ryan (Lab)
22nd	1981	David Molony (FG)	Michael Smith (FF)	John Ryan (Lab)
23rd	1982 (Feb)	David Molony (FG)	Michael O'Kennedy (FF)	John Ryan (Lab)
24th	1982 (Nov)	David Molony (FG)	Michael O'Kennedy (FF)	John Ryan (Lab)
25th	1987	Michael Lowry (FG)	Michael O'Kennedy (FF)	Michael Smith (FF)
26th	1989	Michael Lowry (FG)	Michael O'Kennedy (FF)	Michael Smith (FF)
27th	1992	Michael Lowry (FG)	John Ryan (Lab)	Michael Smith (FF)
28th	1997	Michael Lowry (Ind.)	Michael O'Kennedy (FF)	Michael Smith (FF)
29th	2002	Michael Lowry (Ind.)	Máire Hoctor (FF)	Michael Smith (FF)
30th	2007	Michael Lowry (Ind.)	Máire Hoctor (FF)	Noel Coonan (FG)
31st	2011	Michael Lowry (Ind.)	Alan Kelly (Lab)	Noel Coonan (FG)
32nd	2016	Constituency abolished. See Tipperary and Offaly		

Dáil	Election	Deputy (Party)	Deputy (Party)	Deputy (Party)
34th	2024	Michael Lowry (Ind.)	Alan Kelly (Lab)	Ryan O'Meara (FF)
