= Minister for Climate, Energy and the Environment =

Irish government cabinet minister

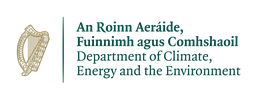

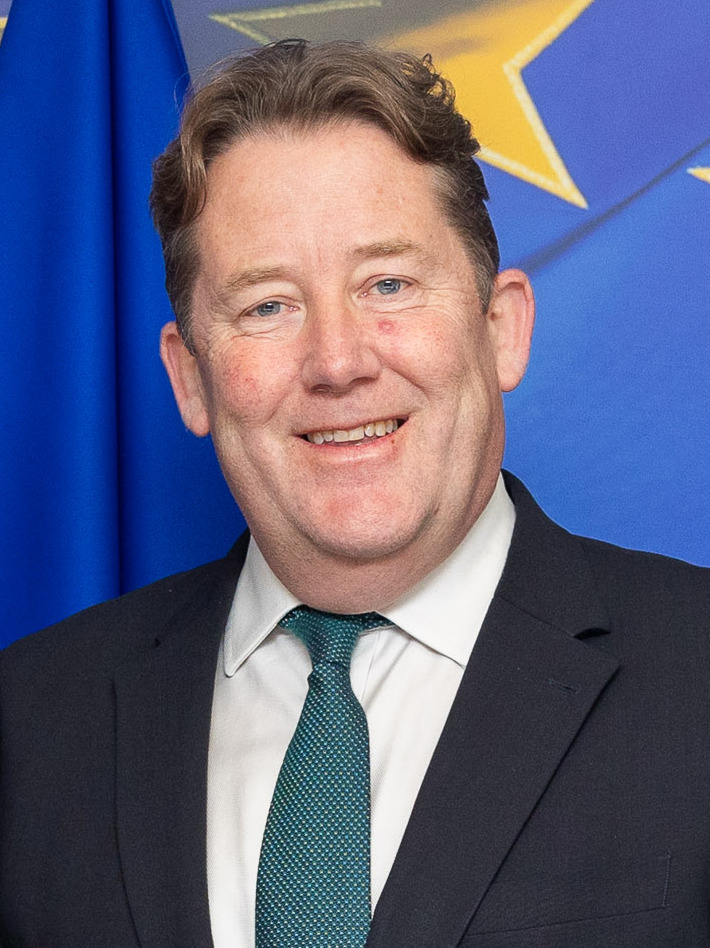
- Incumbent; Darragh O'Brien since 23 January 2025
- Department of Climate, Energy and the Environment
- Type: Environment minister; Communications minister
- Status: Cabinet minister
- Member of: Government of Ireland; Council of the European Union; North/South Ministerial Council; Dáil Éireann
- Reports to: Taoiseach
- Seat: Dublin, Ireland
- Nominator: Taoiseach
- Appointer: President of Ireland; (on the advice of the Taoiseach)
- Inaugural holder: Seán Etchingham as Director of Fisheries
- Formation: 26 August 1921
- Salary: €210,750 (2025) (including €115,953 TD salary)
- Website: Official website

The minister for climate, energy and the environment (Irish: An tAire Aeráide, Fuinnimh agus Comhshaoil) is a senior minister in the Government of Ireland and leads the Department of Climate, Energy and the Environment.

The minister for climate, energy and the environment since January 2025 is Darragh O'Brien, TD. He is also the minister for transport.

He is assisted by two ministers of state:

- Alan Dillon, TD – Minister of State for the circular economy.
- Timmy Dooley, TD – Minister of State for the marine

== List of office-holders ==
=== Director of Fisheries 1919–1921 ===
Name	Term of office		Party	Government(s) (Note: Before 1937: DM – Dáil Ministry; EC – Executive Council.)
Seán Etchingham	2 April 1919	26 August 1921	Sinn Féin	2nd DM
=== Secretary for Fisheries 1921–1922 ===
Name	Term of office		Party	Government(s)
Seán Etchingham	26 August 1921	9 January 1922	Sinn Féin	3rd DM
=== Minister for Fisheries 1922–1928 ===
Name	Term of office		Party	Government(s)
Fionán Lynch	14 December 1922	1 September 1928	Cumann na nGaedheal	1st EC • 2nd EC • 3rd EC • 4th EC
=== Minister for Lands and Fisheries 1928–1934 ===
Name	Term of office		Party	Government(s)
Fionán Lynch	1 September 1928	9 March 1932	Cumann na nGaedheal	4th EC • 5th EC
P. J. Ruttledge	9 March 1932	8 February 1933	Fianna Fáil	6th EC
Joseph Connolly	8 February 1933	1 April 1934	Fianna Fáil	7th EC
=== Minister for Lands 1934–1977 ===
Name	Term of office		Party	Government(s)
Joseph Connolly	1 April 1934	29 May 1936	Fianna Fáil	7th EC
Frank Aiken	3 June 1936	11 November 1936	Fianna Fáil	7th EC
Gerald Boland	11 November 1936	8 September 1939	Fianna Fáil	8th EC • 1st • 2nd
Thomas Derrig (1st time)	8 September 1939	2 July 1943	Fianna Fáil	2nd
Seán Moylan	2 July 1943	18 February 1948	Fianna Fáil	3rd • 4th
Joseph Blowick (1st time)	18 February 1948	7 March 1951	Clann na Talmhan	5th
Thomas Derrig (2nd time)	13 June 1951	2 June 1954	Fianna Fáil	6th
Joseph Blowick (2nd time)	2 June 1954	20 March 1957	Clann na Talmhan	7th
Erskine H. Childers	20 March 1957	23 July 1959	Fianna Fáil	8th • 9th
Mícheál Ó Móráin	23 July 1959	26 March 1968	Fianna Fáil	9th • 10th • 11th • 12th
Pádraig Faulkner	26 March 1968	2 July 1969	Fianna Fáil	12th
Seán Flanagan	2 July 1969	14 March 1973	Fianna Fáil	13th
Tom Fitzpatrick (1st time)	14 March 1973	2 December 1976	Fine Gael	14th
Paddy Donegan	2 December 1976	9 February 1977	Fine Gael	14th
=== Minister for Fisheries 1977–1978 ===
Name	Term of office		Party	Government(s)
Paddy Donegan	9 February 1977	5 July 1977	Fine Gael	14th
Brian Lenihan	5 July 1977	15 July 1978	Fianna Fáil	15th
=== Minister for Fisheries and Forestry 1978–1986 ===
Name	Term of office		Party	Government(s)
Brian Lenihan	15 July 1978	11 December 1979	Fianna Fáil	15th
Paddy Power	12 December 1979	30 June 1981	Fianna Fáil	16th
Tom Fitzpatrick (2nd time)	30 June 1981	9 March 1982	Fine Gael	17th
Brendan Daly (1st time)	9 March 1982	14 December 1982	Fianna Fáil	18th
Paddy O'Toole (1st time)	14 December 1982	14 February 1986	Fine Gael	19th
=== Minister for Tourism, Fisheries and Forestry 1986–1987 ===
Name	Term of office		Party	Government(s)
Liam Kavanagh	14 February 1986	20 January 1987	Labour	19th
Paddy O'Toole (2nd time)	20 January 1987	10 March 1987	Fine Gael	19th
=== Minister for the Marine 1987–1997 ===
Name	Term of office		Party	Government(s)
Brendan Daly (2nd time)	10 March 1987	12 July 1989	Fianna Fáil	20th
John Wilson	12 July 1989	11 February 1992	Fianna Fáil	20th • 21st
Michael Woods (1st time)	11 February 1992	12 January 1993	Fianna Fáil	22nd
David Andrews (Note: Also Minister for Defence.)	12 January 1993	15 December 1994	Fianna Fáil	23rd
Hugh Coveney	15 December 1994	23 May 1995	Fine Gael	24th
Seán Barrett	23 May 1995	26 June 1997	Fine Gael	24th
=== Minister for Marine and Natural Resources 1997–2002 ===
Name	Term of office		Party	Government(s)
Michael Woods (2nd time)	26 June 1997	27 January 2000	Fianna Fáil	25th
Frank Fahey	27 January 2000	6 June 2002	Fianna Fáil	25th
=== Minister for Communications, Marine and Natural Resources 2002–2007 ===
Name	Term of office		Party	Government(s)
Dermot Ahern	6 June 2002	29 September 2004	Fianna Fáil	26th
Noel Dempsey	29 September 2004	14 June 2007	Fianna Fáil	26th
=== Minister for Communications, Energy and Natural Resources 2007–2016 ===
Name	Term of office		Party	Government(s)
Eamon Ryan	14 June 2007	23 January 2011	Green	27th • 28th
Pat Carey	23 January 2011	9 March 2011	Fianna Fáil	28th
Pat Rabbitte	9 March 2011	11 July 2014	Labour	29th
Alex White	11 July 2014	6 May 2016	Labour	29th
=== Minister for Communications, Climate Action and Environment 2016–2020 ===
Name	Term of office		Party	Government(s)
Denis Naughten	6 May 2016	11 October 2018	Independent	30th • 31st
Richard Bruton	11 October 2018	27 June 2020	Fine Gael	31st
=== Minister for the Environment, Climate and Communications 2020–2025 ===
Name	Term of office		Party	Government(s)
Eamon Ryan (Note: Also Minister for Transport.) (2nd time)	27 June 2020	23 January 2025	Green	32nd • 33rd • 34th
=== Minister for Climate, Energy and the Environment 2025–present ===
Name	Term of office		Party	Government(s)
Darragh O'Brien	23 January 2025	Incumbent	Fianna Fáil	35th

== See also ==
- Minister for Housing, Local Government and Heritage (responsible for the Environment until 2016)
- Irish Land Commission
