= John Wilson (Irish politician) =

Irish politician (1923–2007)

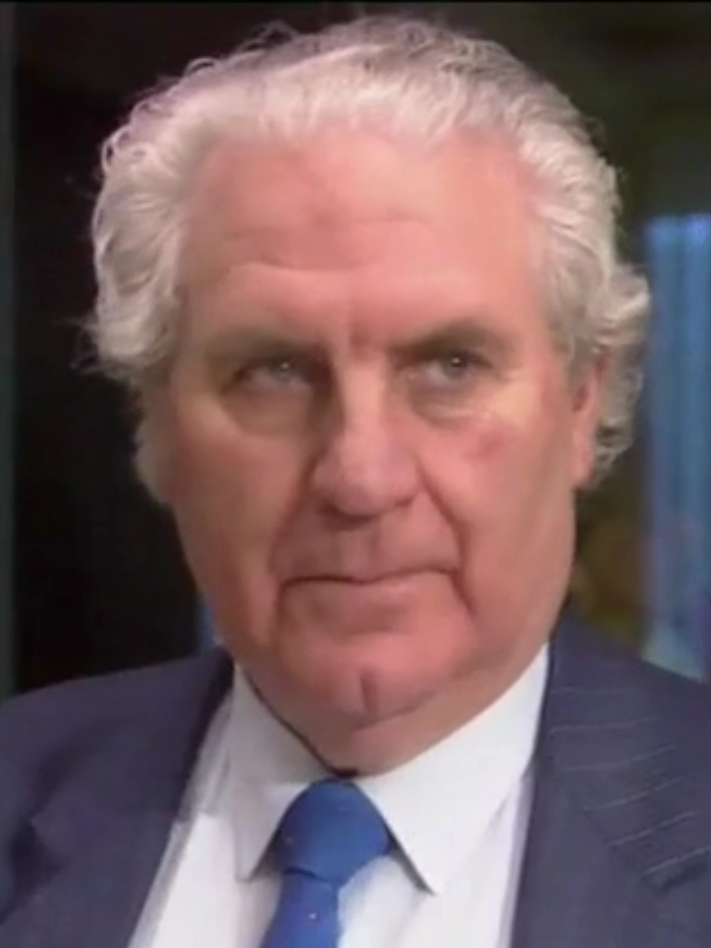
- Wilson in 1987

Tánaiste
- In office 13 November 1990 – 12 January 1993
- Taoiseach: Charles Haughey; Albert Reynolds
- Preceded by: Brian Lenihan
- Succeeded by: Dick Spring

Minister for Defence
- In office 11 February 1992 – 12 January 1993
- Taoiseach: Albert Reynolds
- Preceded by: Vincent Brady
- Succeeded by: David Andrews

Minister for the Gaeltacht
- In office 11 February 1992 – 12 January 1993
- Taoiseach: Albert Reynolds
- Preceded by: Charles Haughey
- Succeeded by: Michael D. Higgins

Minister for the Marine
- In office 12 July 1989 – 11 February 1992
- Taoiseach: Charles Haughey
- Preceded by: Brendan Daly
- Succeeded by: Michael Woods

Minister for Tourism and Transport
- In office 31 March 1987 – 12 July 1989
- Taoiseach: Charles Haughey
- Preceded by: Ray MacSharry
- Succeeded by: Séamus Brennan

Minister for Communications
- In office 10 March 1987 – 31 March 1987
- Taoiseach: Charles Haughey
- Preceded by: Jim Mitchell
- Succeeded by: Ray Burke

Minister for Posts and Telegraphs
- In office 9 March 1982 – 14 December 1982
- Taoiseach: Charles Haughey
- Preceded by: Patrick Cooney
- Succeeded by: Jim Mitchell

Minister for Education
- In office 5 July 1977 – 30 June 1981
- Taoiseach: Jack Lynch; Charles Haughey
- Preceded by: Peter Barry
- Succeeded by: John Boland

Teachta Dála
- In office June 1977 – November 1992
- Constituency: Cavan–Monaghan
- In office February 1973 – June 1977
- Constituency: Cavan

Personal details
- Born: 8 July 1923 Kilcogy, County Cavan, Ireland
- Died: 9 July 2007 (aged 84) Beaumont, Dublin, Ireland
- Party: Fianna Fáil
- Spouse: Ita Ward
- Children: 5
- Relatives: Diarmuid Wilson (nephew)
- Education: National University of Ireland; University of London

John Patrick Wilson (8 July 1923 – 9 July 2007) was an Irish Fianna Fáil politician who served as Tánaiste from 1990 to 1993, Minister for Defence and Minister for the Gaeltacht from 1992 to 1993, Minister for the Marine from 1989 to 1992, Minister for Tourism and Transport from 1987 to 1989, Minister for Communications in March 1987, Minister for Posts and Telegraphs from March 1982 to December 1982 and Minister for Education from 1977 to 1981. He served as a TD from 1973 to 1992.

== Early life ==
Wilson was born in 1923 at Callanagh, Kilcogy, County Cavan, the son of John Wilson, a farmer, and his wife Brigid (née Comaskey). He was educated at St. Mel's College in Longford, the University of London and the National University of Ireland. In 1942 he entered Maynooth College to train for the Catholic priesthood, but left after four years as a seminarian. He graduated with a Master of Arts in Classics and a Higher Diploma in Education. He was a secondary school teacher at St Eunan's College in Letterkenny and Gonzaga College and also a university lecturer at University College Dublin (UCD), before he became involved in politics.

== Gaelic football ==
Wilson was also a Gaelic footballer for the Cavan county team, with which he won two All-Ireland medals; one in 1947 in the Polo Grounds, New York. He was a member of the teachers trade union, the Association of Secondary Teachers, Ireland (ASTI), and served as president of the association. While at St Eunan's College in Letterkenny (at which time he lived at 3 College Row, close to the school gates, and taught within them between 1952 and 1960),

Wilson was known as "Big Johnny", training the team that would reach the final of the 1961 MacRory Cup (though he departed for a teaching post at Gonzaga College midway through the year).

== Political career ==
Wilson was first elected to Dáil Éireann at the 1973 general election for the Cavan constituency, for Cavan–Monaghan in 1977 and at each subsequent election until his retirement after the dissolution of the 26th Dail in 1992. He was succeeded as Fianna Fáil TD for Cavan-Monaghan by his special advisor, Brendan Smith, who went on to serve as Minister for Agriculture, Fisheries and Food from 2008 to 2011. In 1977, Taoiseach Jack Lynch appointed Wilson to the cabinet as Minister for Education. He went on to serve in each Fianna Fáil government until his retirement, serving in the governments of Jack Lynch, Charles Haughey and Albert Reynolds.

In 1990, Wilson challenged Brian Lenihan for the Fianna Fáil nomination for the 1990 presidential election. Lenihan won the nomination but failed to be elected President and was also sacked by the government. Wilson was then appointed Tánaiste. He remained in the cabinet until his retirement in 1993. Although the 26th Dail was dissolved in December 1992, Wilson served in Government until the new government took office.

== Retirement ==
Following his retirement from politics, Wilson was appointed the Commissioner of the Independent Commission for the Location of Victims' Remains by Taoiseach Bertie Ahern. This position entailed involvement with members of the Provisional IRA to assist in finding the bodies of the disappeared who were murdered by the Provisional IRA during The Troubles.

Wilson died in Beaumont, Dublin, on 9 July 2007.

== See also ==
- Families in the Oireachtas

Political offices
Preceded by Peter Barry	Minister for Education; 1977–1981	Succeeded by John Boland
Preceded by Patrick Cooney	Minister for Posts and Telegraphs; 1982	Succeeded by Jim Mitchell
Preceded by Jim Mitchell	Minister for Communications; 1987	Succeeded by Ray Burke
Preceded by Ray MacSharry	Minister for Tourism and Transport; 1987–1989	Succeeded by Séamus Brennan
Preceded by Brendan Daly	Minister for the Marine; 1989–1992	Succeeded by Michael Woods
Preceded by Brian Lenihan	Tánaiste; 1990–1993	Succeeded by Dick Spring
Preceded by Vincent Brady	Minister for Defence; 1992–1993	Succeeded by David Andrews
Preceded by Charles Haughey	Minister for the Gaeltacht; 1992–1993	Succeeded by Michael D. Higgins
Party political offices
Preceded by Brian Lenihan Snr	Deputy leader of Fianna Fáil; 1990–1992	Succeeded by Bertie Ahern

Dáil	Election	Deputy (Party)	Deputy (Party)	Deputy (Party)	Deputy (Party)
2nd	1921	Arthur Griffith (SF)	Peter Paul Galligan (SF)	Seán Milroy (SF)	3 seats 1921–1923
3rd	1922	Arthur Griffith (PT-SF)	Walter L. Cole (PT-SF)	Seán Milroy (PT-SF)	3 seats 1921–1923
4th	1923	Patrick Smith (Rep)	John James Cole (Ind.)	Seán Milroy (CnaG)	Patrick Baxter (FP)
4th	1925 by-election	Patrick Smith (Rep)	John James Cole (Ind.)	John Joe O'Reilly (CnaG)	Patrick Baxter (FP)
5th	1927 (Jun)	Patrick Smith (FF)	John O'Hanlon (Ind.)	John Joe O'Reilly (CnaG)	Patrick Baxter (FP)
6th	1927 (Sep)	Patrick Smith (FF)	John O'Hanlon (Ind.)	John Joe O'Reilly (CnaG)	John James Cole (Ind.)
7th	1932	Patrick Smith (FF)	John O'Hanlon (Ind.)	John Joe O'Reilly (CnaG)	Michael Sheridan (FF)
8th	1933	Patrick Smith (FF)	Patrick McGovern (NCP)	John Joe O'Reilly (CnaG)	Michael Sheridan (FF)
9th	1937	Patrick Smith (FF)	Patrick McGovern (FG)	John James Cole (Ind.)	Michael Sheridan (FF)
10th	1938	Patrick Smith (FF)	Patrick McGovern (FG)	John James Cole (Ind.)	Michael Sheridan (FF)
11th	1943	Patrick Smith (FF)	Patrick O'Reilly (CnaT)	John James Cole (Ind.)	Michael Sheridan (FF)
12th	1944	Patrick Smith (FF)	Patrick O'Reilly (CnaT)	Tom O'Reilly (Ind.)	Michael Sheridan (FF)
13th	1948	Patrick Smith (FF)	John Tully (CnaP)	Patrick O'Reilly (Ind.)	Michael Sheridan (FF)
14th	1951	Patrick Smith (FF)	John Tully (CnaP)	Patrick O'Reilly (FG)	Michael Sheridan (FF)
15th	1954	Patrick Smith (FF)	John Tully (CnaP)	Patrick O'Reilly (FG)	Michael Sheridan (FF)
16th	1957	Patrick Smith (FF)	John Tully (CnaP)	Patrick O'Reilly (FG)	Michael Sheridan (FF)
17th	1961	Patrick Smith (FF)	Séamus Dolan (FF)	Patrick O'Reilly (FG)	3 seats 1961–1977
18th	1965	Patrick Smith (FF)	John Tully (CnaP)	Tom Fitzpatrick (FG)	3 seats 1961–1977
19th	1969	Patrick Smith (FF)	Patrick O'Reilly (FG)	Tom Fitzpatrick (FG)	3 seats 1961–1977
20th	1973	Patrick Smith (FF)	John Wilson (FF)	Tom Fitzpatrick (FG)	3 seats 1961–1977
21st	1977	Constituency abolished. See Cavan–Monaghan			

Dáil	Election	Deputy (Party)	Deputy (Party)	Deputy (Party)	Deputy (Party)	Deputy (Party)
21st	1977	Jimmy Leonard (FF)	John Wilson (FF)	Thomas J. Fitzpatrick (FG)	Rory O'Hanlon (FF)	John Conlan (FG)
22nd	1981	Kieran Doherty (AHB)	John Wilson (FF)	Thomas J. Fitzpatrick (FG)	Rory O'Hanlon (FF)	John Conlan (FG)
23rd	1982 (Feb)	Jimmy Leonard (FF)	John Wilson (FF)	Thomas J. Fitzpatrick (FG)	Rory O'Hanlon (FF)	John Conlan (FG)
24th	1982 (Nov)	Jimmy Leonard (FF)	John Wilson (FF)	Thomas J. Fitzpatrick (FG)	Rory O'Hanlon (FF)	John Conlan (FG)
25th	1987	Jimmy Leonard (FF)	John Wilson (FF)	Thomas J. Fitzpatrick (FG)	Rory O'Hanlon (FF)	Andrew Boylan (FG)
26th	1989	Jimmy Leonard (FF)	John Wilson (FF)	Bill Cotter (FG)	Rory O'Hanlon (FF)	Andrew Boylan (FG)
27th	1992	Jimmy Leonard (FF)	Brendan Smith (FF)	Seymour Crawford (FG)	Rory O'Hanlon (FF)	Andrew Boylan (FG)
28th	1997	Caoimhghín Ó Caoláin (SF)	Brendan Smith (FF)	Seymour Crawford (FG)	Rory O'Hanlon (FF)	Andrew Boylan (FG)
29th	2002	Caoimhghín Ó Caoláin (SF)	Brendan Smith (FF)	Seymour Crawford (FG)	Rory O'Hanlon (FF)	Paudge Connolly (Ind.)
30th	2007	Caoimhghín Ó Caoláin (SF)	Brendan Smith (FF)	Seymour Crawford (FG)	Rory O'Hanlon (FF)	Margaret Conlon (FF)
31st	2011	Caoimhghín Ó Caoláin (SF)	Brendan Smith (FF)	Heather Humphreys (FG)	Joe O'Reilly (FG)	Seán Conlan (FG)
32nd	2016	Caoimhghín Ó Caoláin (SF)	Brendan Smith (FF)	Heather Humphreys (FG)	Niamh Smyth (FF)	4 seats 2016–2020
33rd	2020	Matt Carthy (SF)	Brendan Smith (FF)	Heather Humphreys (FG)	Niamh Smyth (FF)	Pauline Tully (SF)
34th	2024	Matt Carthy (SF)	Brendan Smith (FF)	David Maxwell (FG)	Niamh Smyth (FF)	Cathy Bennett (SF)
