= Michael Woods (Irish politician) =

Irish former politician (born 1935)

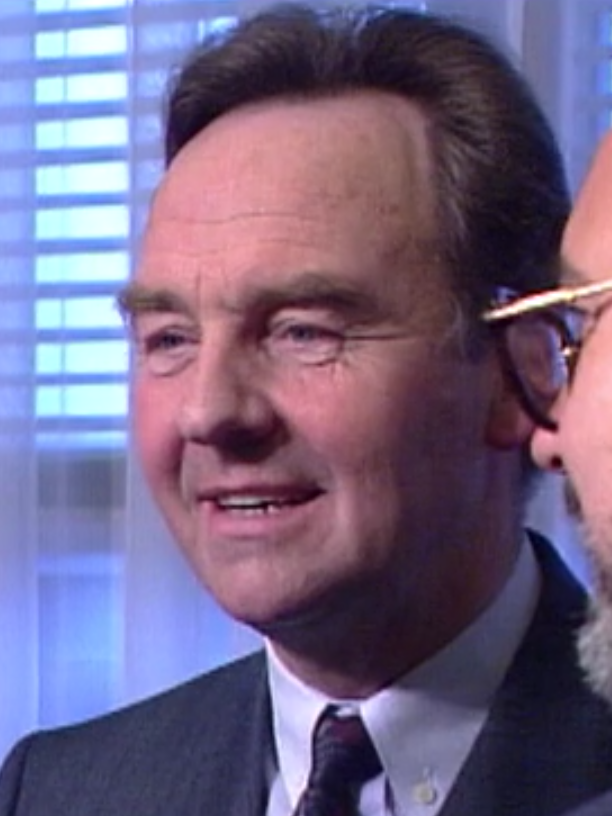
- Woods in 1991

Minister for Education and Science
- In office 27 January 2000 – 6 June 2002
- Taoiseach: Bertie Ahern
- Preceded by: Micheál Martin
- Succeeded by: Noel Dempsey

Minister for the Marine and Natural Resources
- In office 26 June 1997 – 27 January 2000
- Taoiseach: Bertie Ahern
- Preceded by: Seán Barrett
- Succeeded by: Frank Fahey

Minister for the Marine
- In office 11 February 1992 – 12 January 1993
- Taoiseach: Albert Reynolds
- Preceded by: John Wilson
- Succeeded by: David Andrews

Minister for Agriculture and Food
- In office 14 November 1991 – 11 February 1992
- Taoiseach: Charles Haughey
- Preceded by: Michael O'Kennedy
- Succeeded by: Joe Walsh

Minister for Social Welfare
- In office 12 January 1993 – 15 December 1994
- Taoiseach: Albert Reynolds
- Preceded by: Charlie McCreevy
- Succeeded by: Prionsias de Rossa
- In office 10 March 1987 – 13 November 1991
- Taoiseach: Charles Haughey
- Preceded by: Gemma Hussey
- Succeeded by: Brendan Daly
- In office 9 March 1982 – 14 December 1982
- Taoiseach: Charles Haughey
- Preceded by: Eileen Desmond
- Succeeded by: Barry Desmond
- In office 12 December 1979 – 30 June 1981
- Taoiseach: Charles Haughey
- Preceded by: Charles Haughey
- Succeeded by: Eileen Desmond

Minister for Health
- In office 17 November 1994 – 15 December 1994
- Taoiseach: Albert Reynolds
- Preceded by: Brendan Howlin
- Succeeded by: Michael Noonan
- In office 9 March 1982 – 14 December 1982
- Taoiseach: Charles Haughey
- Preceded by: Eileen Desmond
- Succeeded by: Barry Desmond
- In office 12 December 1979 – 30 June 1981
- Taoiseach: Charles Haughey
- Preceded by: Charles Haughey
- Succeeded by: Eileen Desmond

Minister of State
- 1979: Government Chief Whip
- 1979: Defence

Teachta Dála
- In office June 1981 – February 2011
- Constituency: Dublin North-East
- In office June 1977 – June 1981
- Constituency: Dublin Clontarf

Personal details
- Born: 8 December 1935 (age 90) Bray, County Wicklow, Ireland
- Party: Fianna Fáil
- Spouse: Margot Maher (m. 1967)
- Children: 5
- Education: University College Dublin; Harvard University

Michael Joseph Woods (born 8 December 1935) is an Irish former Fianna Fáil politician who served as Government Chief Whip from July 1979 to December 1979, Minister for Social Welfare from 1979 to 1981, 1987 to 1991, March 1982 to December 1982 and 1993 to 1994, Minister for Health from 1979 to 1981, March 1982 to December 1982 and November 1994 to December 1994, Minister for Agriculture and Food from 1991 to 1992, Minister for the Marine from 1992 to 1993, Minister for the Marine and Natural Resources from 1997 to 2000 and Minister for Education and Science from 2000 to 2002. He served as a Teachta Dála (TD) from 1977 to 2011.

== Early life ==
Woods was born in County Wicklow in December 1935. He was educated at Christian Brothers in Synge Street, Dublin; University College Dublin and Harvard Business School. He qualified with a degree in Agricultural science and a PhD in science.

== Political career ==
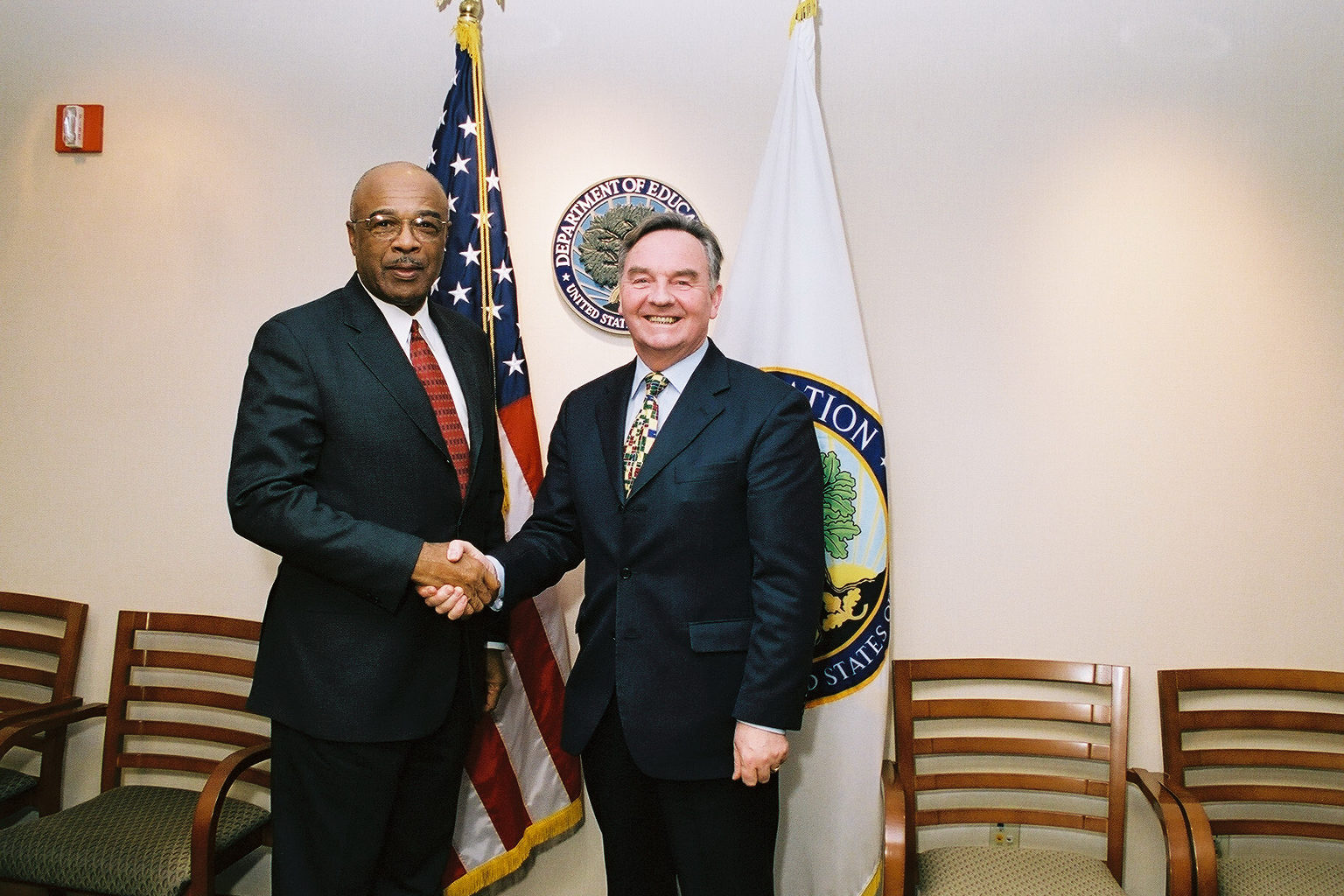
Woods with United States Secretary of Education Rod Paige in February 2002

Woods joined Fianna Fáil in 1968. At the 1977 general election he stood for the Dáil in the Dublin Clontarf constituency as a Fianna Fáil candidate and was elected alongside Fianna Fáil stalwart George Colley. From 1981 to 2011, he was elected for the Dublin North-East constituency. In 1979, Jack Lynch appointed him as Minister of State at the Department of the Taoiseach (Government Chief Whip). That same year Woods supported Colley in his leadership bid, but the other candidate, Charles Haughey, was successful.

Despite Woods having supported Colley, Haughey appointed him Minister for Health and Social Welfare. He held that post until 1981, and again in the short-lived 1982 government. In 1987, Fianna Fáil returned to power and he returned as Minister for Social Welfare. In 1991, he became Minister for Agriculture and Food. In 1992, Woods entered the contest to succeed Haughey as leader. He received little support and withdrew from the contest. The eventual victor, Albert Reynolds, retained Woods as Minister for the Marine in his new cabinet. Following the formation of the Fianna Fáil–Labour Party coalition in 1993, Woods remained in the cabinet, this time with the Social Welfare portfolio, and—after the mass resignation of the Labour ministers—was additionally appointed Minister for Health.

After three years in opposition, Fianna Fáil returned to power in 1997. Woods was appointed Minister for the Marine and Natural Resources. He introduced a £70 million overhaul of Ireland's fishing fleet and also launched a new maritime college. In the cabinet reshuffle in 2000, he replaced Micheál Martin as Minister for Education. Woods was not retained in the cabinet following the 2002 general election. He was Chairman of the Joint Oireachtas Committee on Foreign Affairs from 2002 to 2007.

He retired from politics at the 2011 general election.

== Controversies ==
While serving as Minister for Education, Woods signed a controversial agreement with 18 Irish religious orders involved in child sex-abuse scandals which limited their compensation liability to the victims of abuse to only €128 million. This compensation scheme is projected to eventually cost the Irish government €1.35 billion. The agreement was signed just before the 2002 general election and consequently was not laid before the cabinet for its approval. It then remained unpublished for several months.

In 2003, after brokering the deal, Woods claimed his strong Catholic faith made him the most suitable person to negotiate the deal. He also denied allegations that he was a member of Opus Dei or the Knights of Saint Columbanus after the group Survivors of Child Abuse alleged he was a member of the former.

After the publication of the report of the Commission to Inquire into Child Abuse (CICA), Woods defended the deal; he claimed the Department of Education and Science had the management role in the schools in question and that the state knew all the details when making the deal. Mary Raftery criticised his remarks, pointing out that some of them contradicted remarks made by Woods himself.

Political offices
Preceded by Patrick Lalor	Government Chief Whip; Jul. 1979–Dec. 1979	Succeeded by Seán Moore
Preceded by Patrick Lalor	Minister of State at the Department of Defence; Jul. 1979–Dec. 1979	Succeeded by Seán Moore
Preceded by Charles Haughey	Minister for Health; 1979–1981	Succeeded by Eileen Desmond
Preceded by Charles Haughey	Minister for Social Welfare; 1979–1981	Succeeded by Eileen Desmond
Preceded by Eileen Desmond	Minister for Health; 1982	Succeeded by Barry Desmond
Preceded by Eileen Desmond	Minister for Social Welfare; 1982	Succeeded by Barry Desmond
Preceded by Gemma Hussey	Minister for Social Welfare; 1987–1991	Succeeded by Brendan Daly
Preceded by Michael O'Kennedy	Minister for Agriculture and Food; 1991–1992	Succeeded by Joe Walsh
Preceded by John Wilson	Minister for the Marine; 1992–1993	Succeeded by David Andrews
Preceded by Charlie McCreevy	Minister for Social Welfare; 1993–1994	Succeeded by Proinsias De Rossa
Preceded by Brendan Howlin	Minister for Health; 1994	Succeeded by Michael Noonan
Preceded by Seán Barrett	Minister for Marine and Natural Resources; 1997–2000	Succeeded by Frank Fahey
Preceded by Micheál Martin	Minister for Education and Science; 2000–2002	Succeeded by Noel Dempsey

Dáil	Election	Deputy (Party)	Deputy (Party)	Deputy (Party)
21st	1977	George Colley (FF)	Michael Woods (FF)	Michael Joe Cosgrave (FG)
22nd	1981	Constituency abolished		

Dáil	Election	Deputy (Party)	Deputy (Party)	Deputy (Party)	Deputy (Party)	Deputy (Party)
9th	1937	Alfie Byrne (Ind.)	Oscar Traynor (FF)	James Larkin (Ind.)	3 seats 1937–1948	
10th	1938	Alfie Byrne (Ind.)	Oscar Traynor (FF)	Richard Mulcahy (FG)	3 seats 1937–1948	
11th	1943	Alfie Byrne (Ind.)	Oscar Traynor (FF)	James Larkin (Lab)	3 seats 1937–1948	
12th	1944	Alfie Byrne (Ind.)	Oscar Traynor (FF)	Harry Colley (FF)	3 seats 1937–1948	
13th	1948	Alfie Byrne (Ind.)	Oscar Traynor (FF)	Harry Colley (FF)	Jack Belton (FG)	Peadar Cowan (CnaP)
14th	1951	Alfie Byrne (Ind.)	Oscar Traynor (FF)	Harry Colley (FF)	Jack Belton (FG)	Peadar Cowan (Ind.)
15th	1954	Alfie Byrne (Ind.)	Oscar Traynor (FF)	Harry Colley (FF)	Jack Belton (FG)	Denis Larkin (Lab)
15th	1956 by-election	Patrick Byrne (FG)	Oscar Traynor (FF)	Harry Colley (FF)	Jack Belton (FG)	Denis Larkin (Lab)
16th	1957	Patrick Byrne (FG)	Oscar Traynor (FF)	Charles Haughey (FF)	Jack Belton (FG)	Denis Larkin (Lab)
17th	1961	Patrick Byrne (FG)	George Colley (FF)	Charles Haughey (FF)	Jack Belton (FG)	Eugene Timmons (FF)
17th	1963 by-election	Patrick Byrne (FG)	George Colley (FF)	Charles Haughey (FF)	Paddy Belton (FG)	Eugene Timmons (FF)
18th	1965	Patrick Byrne (FG)	George Colley (FF)	Charles Haughey (FF)	Paddy Belton (FG)	Denis Larkin (Lab)
19th	1969	Conor Cruise O'Brien (Lab)	Eugene Timmons (FF)	Charles Haughey (FF)	Paddy Belton (FG)	4 seats 1969–1977
20th	1973	Conor Cruise O'Brien (Lab)	Eugene Timmons (FF)	Charles Haughey (FF)	Paddy Belton (FG)	4 seats 1969–1977
21st	1977	Constituency abolished				

Dáil	Election	Deputy (Party)	Deputy (Party)	Deputy (Party)	Deputy (Party)
22nd	1981	Michael Woods (FF)	Liam Fitzgerald (FF)	Seán Dublin Bay Rockall Loftus (Ind.)	Michael Joe Cosgrave (FG)
23rd	1982 (Feb)	Michael Woods (FF)	Maurice Manning (FG)	Ned Brennan (FF)	Michael Joe Cosgrave (FG)
24th	1982 (Nov)	Michael Woods (FF)	Maurice Manning (FG)	Liam Fitzgerald (FF)	Michael Joe Cosgrave (FG)
25th	1987	Michael Woods (FF)	Pat McCartan (WP)	Liam Fitzgerald (FF)	Michael Joe Cosgrave (FG)
26th	1989	Michael Woods (FF)	Pat McCartan (WP)	Liam Fitzgerald (FF)	Michael Joe Cosgrave (FG)
27th	1992	Michael Woods (FF)	Tommy Broughan (Lab)	Liam Fitzgerald (FF)	Seán Kenny (Lab)
28th	1997	Michael Woods (FF)	Tommy Broughan (Lab)	Martin Brady (FF)	Michael Joe Cosgrave (FG)
29th	2002	Michael Woods (FF)	Tommy Broughan (Lab)	Martin Brady (FF)	3 seats from 2002
30th	2007	Michael Woods (FF)	Tommy Broughan (Lab)	Terence Flanagan (FG)	3 seats from 2002
31st	2011	Seán Kenny (Lab)	Tommy Broughan (Lab)	Terence Flanagan (FG)	3 seats from 2002
32nd	2016	Constituency abolished. See Dublin Bay North			
