= Brian Lenihan Snr =

Irish politician (1930–1995)

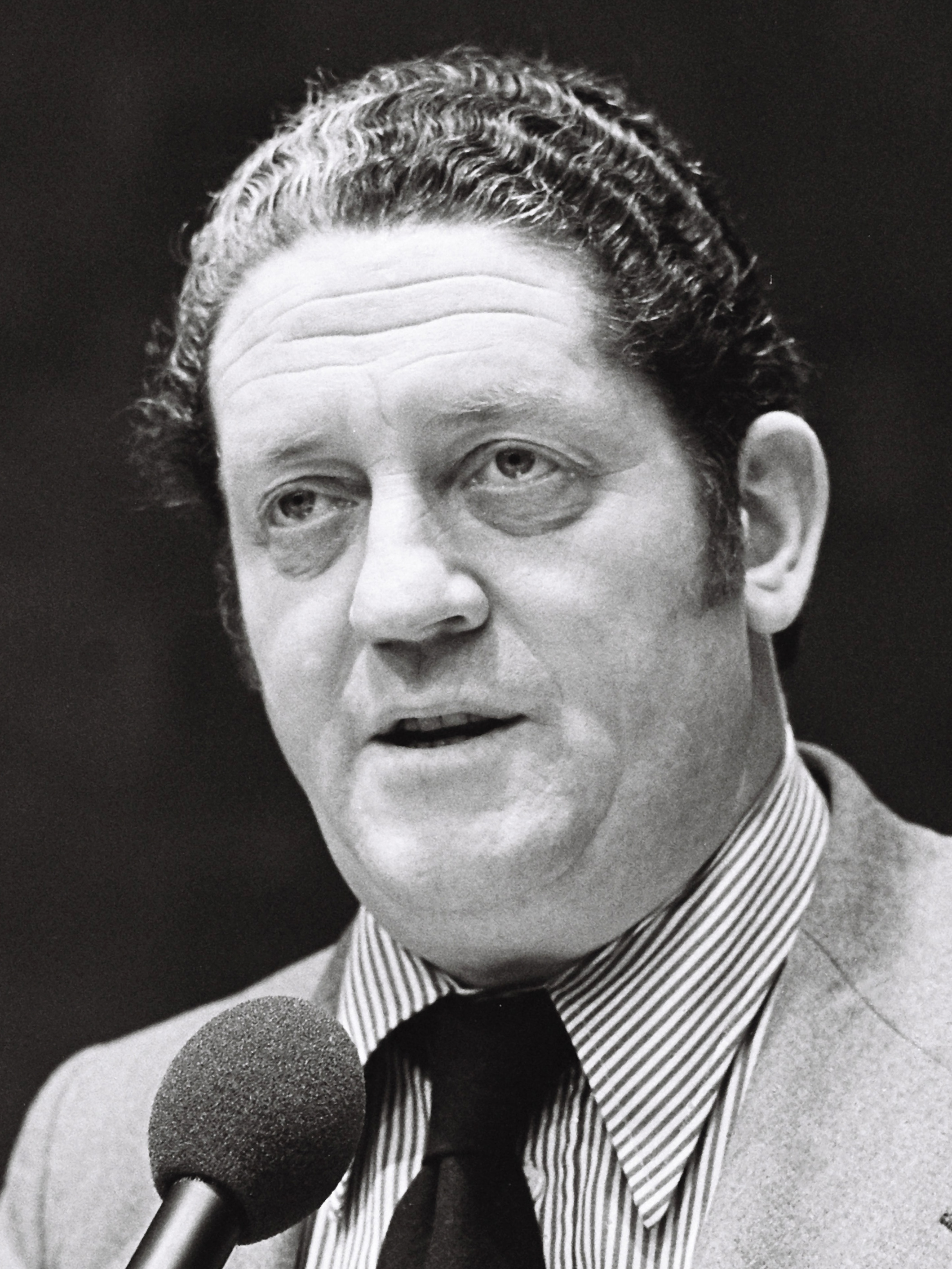
- Lenihan in 1977

Tánaiste
- In office 10 March 1987 – 31 October 1990
- Taoiseach: Charles Haughey
- Preceded by: Peter Barry
- Succeeded by: John Wilson

Minister for Defence
- In office 12 July 1989 – 31 October 1990
- Taoiseach: Charles Haughey
- Preceded by: Michael J. Noonan
- Succeeded by: Brendan Daly

Minister for Agriculture
- In office 9 March 1982 – 14 December 1982
- Taoiseach: Charles Haughey
- Preceded by: Alan Dukes
- Succeeded by: Austin Deasy

Minister for Fisheries
- In office 5 July 1977 – 12 December 1979
- Taoiseach: Jack Lynch
- Preceded by: Paddy Donegan
- Succeeded by: Paddy Power

Minister for Foreign Affairs
- In office 10 March 1987 – 12 July 1989
- Taoiseach: Charles Haughey
- Preceded by: Peter Barry
- Succeeded by: Gerry Collins
- In office 12 December 1979 – 30 June 1981
- Taoiseach: Charles Haughey
- Preceded by: Michael O'Kennedy
- Succeeded by: John Kelly
- In office 3 January 1973 – 14 March 1973
- Taoiseach: Jack Lynch
- Preceded by: Patrick Hillery
- Succeeded by: Garret FitzGerald

Minister for Transport and Power
- In office 2 July 1969 – 3 January 1973
- Taoiseach: Jack Lynch
- Preceded by: Erskine Childers
- Succeeded by: Michael O'Kennedy

Minister for Education
- In office 26 March 1968 – 2 July 1969
- Taoiseach: Jack Lynch
- Preceded by: Jack Lynch
- Succeeded by: Pádraig Faulkner

Minister for Justice
- In office 3 November 1964 – 26 March 1968
- Taoiseach: Seán Lemass; Jack Lynch
- Preceded by: Seán Lemass
- Succeeded by: Mícheál Ó Móráin

Parliamentary Secretary
- 1961–1964: Justice
- 1961–1964: Lands

Teachta Dála
- In office June 1977 – 1 November 1995
- Constituency: Dublin West
- In office June 1977 – June 1981
- Constituency: Dublin County West
- In office June 1969 – February 1973
- Constituency: Roscommon–Leitrim
- In office October 1961 – June 1969
- Constituency: Roscommon
Other parliamentary offices
Member of the European Parliament
In office 13 March 1973 – 16 June 1977
Constituency	Oireachtas Delegation
Senator
In office 1 June 1973 – 16 June 1977
In office 22 May 1957 – 4 October 1961
Constituency	Industrial and Commercial Panel

Personal details
- Born: 17 November 1930 Dundalk, County Louth, Ireland
- Died: 1 November 1995 (aged 64) Castleknock, Dublin, Ireland
- Party: Fianna Fáil
- Spouse: Anne Devine (m. 1958)
- Children: 7, including Brian and Conor
- Parent: Patrick Lenihan (father)
- Relatives: Mary O'Rourke (sister); Feargal O'Rourke (nephew)
- Education: University College Dublin; King's Inns

Brian Patrick Lenihan (17 November 1930 – 1 November 1995) was an Irish Fianna Fáil politician who served in a number of ministerial positions spanning four decades from the 1960s to 1990s, and was Tánaiste from 1987 to 1990. He served as a Teachta Dála (TD) from 1961 to 1973 and from 1977 to 1995, and was a Senator for the Industrial and Commercial Panel from 1957 to 1961 and 1973 to 1977. He also served as a Member of the European Parliament (MEP) for the Oireachtas from 1973 to 1977. In the 1990 presidential election, he unsuccessfully stood as Fianna Fáil's presidential candidate.

He was a member of a family political dynasty; his father, Patrick Lenihan, and sister both followed him into Dáil Éireann; his sister Mary O'Rourke sitting in cabinet with him. Two of his sons, Brian Lenihan Jnr and Conor Lenihan, became TDs in the 1990s. Brian Lenihan Jnr served as Minister for Finance and Conor was Minister of State in the government of Taoiseach Brian Cowen. Two phrases associated with Lenihan Snr, No problem and On mature recollection, entered the Irish political lexicon.

== Early life ==
Born in Dundalk, County Louth, Lenihan was the son of Patrick Lenihan and Anne Scanlon. His father had been active in the Irish Republican Army, which saw action during the Irish War of Independence and the Irish Civil War. He had been an admirer of Michael Collins and took the pro-Treaty side in 1922, before later returning to his studies and qualifying as a teacher.

Lenihan, who was one of five children, grew up in Athlone. He was educated at Marist College in the town before later studying law at University College Dublin (UCD), where he was actively involved in the Law Society as a Committee Member, and also played football for UCD, scoring against Sligo Rovers in the 1952–1953 FAI Cup. He later qualified as a barrister from King's Inns. He then practised law for a few years before becoming a full-time politician.

== Political career ==
=== Beginnings ===
Lenihan first entered politics in 1954, when he ran as a Fianna Fáil candidate in Longford–Westmeath in that year's general election. Of the four Fianna Fáil candidates, Lenihan was the only one not to be elected.

Three years later Lenihan contested the 1957 general election, this time in the Roscommon constituency. Although he received more first preferences than any of the other Fianna Fáil candidates, he lost out on a Dáil seat once again. In spite of this, he was elected to the Seanad for the Industrial and Commercial Panel in 1957

After four years as a senator, Lenihan finally secured a seat in Dáil Éireann, following his success at the 1961 general election in Roscommon. He had the distinction of being made a Parliamentary Secretary on his first day in the Dáil as a TD, serving under both Minister for Lands Mícheál Ó Móráin and Minister for Justice Charles Haughey.

=== Minister for Justice ===
A cabinet reshuffle saw Lenihan join the cabinet of Seán Lemass in 1964, as Minister for Justice. His predecessor in the office, Charles Haughey, systematically reviewed, repealed or amended Acts dating back 700 years in the single largest reform of the Irish civil and criminal code ever undertaken. Lenihan carried the legislative programme, covering everything from repealing mediæval laws to granting succession rights to married women. As Minister, it was Lenihan who repealed Ireland's notorious censorship laws. Controversially he also suggested that Ireland should rejoin the Commonwealth of Nations, though it is unclear whether that suggestion actually reflected his opinion or whether he was simply raising the issue at Lemass's request to gauge public reaction.

=== Minister for Education ===
In 1968, Lemass's successor Jack Lynch appointed Lenihan as Minister for Education. As Minister, he controversially proposed the merger of Dublin's (then) two universities, Trinity College Dublin (TCD) and University College Dublin (UCD). (Note: Both still exist, alongside a third since created, Dublin City University, formerly the National Institute for Higher Education, Dublin (NIHE, Dublin).) The scheme was abandoned after mass opposition, Lenihan famously being forced to flee student protests in Trinity through a toilet window. Lenihan was also Minister during a 19-day secondary teachers' strike in February 1969.

=== Minister for Transport and Power ===
Following the 1969 general election, Fianna Fáil returned to power for a fourth successive term of office. Lenihan had hopes of further promotion within the cabinet, however, his appointment as Minister for Transport and Power was largely seen as a demotion.

=== Minister for Foreign Affairs ===
In 1973, Patrick Hillery was appointed as Ireland's European Commissioner, upon the Irish entry to the European Economic Community. Lenihan then finally secured his much sought-after portfolio, that of Minister for Foreign Affairs. His tenure was short-lived, as the government fell and a new Fine Gael-Labour Party government took office, following the 1973 general election.

== Political return ==
Lenihan also dramatically lost his Roscommon–Leitrim seat. He once again became a Senator, becoming his party's leader in the upper house. In 1973, he was appointed a member of the second delegation from the Oireachtas to the European Parliament.

He moved his political base from rural Roscommon to Dublin West, where he was elected as a TD at the 1977 general election, which saw a landslide victory for Fianna Fáil. Jack Lynch appointed him Minister for Forestry and Fisheries.

At Lynch's retirement in 1979, Fianna Fáil saw a leadership battle between Charles Haughey (the radical republican candidate) and George Colley (the party establishment candidate and mild republican). Lenihan dismissed the choice as being between a "knave and a fool". He also described himself as being the "x in Oxo". (Note: Oxo is a well-known brand of stock cube.) He was believed to have backed Colley. Years later he claimed he had actually supported Haughey, but not everyone accepted this assertion.

Haughey, seeking to weaken the faction supporting Colley, appointed Lenihan as Minister for Foreign Affairs, a post he held until Fianna Fáil lost power in 1981. His period in Foreign Affairs was overshadowed by a comment made after an Anglo-Irish summit between Haughey and British Prime Minister Margaret Thatcher, when he spoke of Britain and Ireland being able to bring about Irish unity within ten years, a comment which infuriated the British and Northern Ireland unionists and which undid much of the goodwill achieved by the summit. His comments, at a time of major problems within Northern Ireland, with the Provisional IRA and Irish National Liberation Army campaigns in full swing along with Ulster Defence Association and other loyalists conducting reprisals were widely criticised in the Irish media as insensitive, especially as Irish unity had not even been on the agenda of the summit. One newspaper columnist commented simply "there goes Brian, pointlessly talking himself into trouble again". In 1982, when Fianna Fáil regained power for what would prove only ten months, Lenihan was appointed Minister for Agriculture, the announcement in the Dáil being greeted by a sustained round of laughter on the opposition benches.

== Anglo-Irish Agreement opposition ==
In opposition, Lenihan and Haughey attracted some international criticism when, against the advice of senior Irish-American politicians Senator Edward Kennedy and Speaker Tip O'Neill, they campaigned against the Anglo-Irish Agreement, which the government of Taoiseach Garret FitzGerald had signed with the British government of Prime Minister Margaret Thatcher. The agreement gave the Republic of Ireland an advisory role in the governance of Northern Ireland. In 1987, Fianna Fáil returned to power and Lenihan was for the third and final time appointed Minister for Foreign Affairs, with the additional post of Tánaiste. In power Haughey and Lenihan reversed their opposition to the Anglo-Irish Agreement, Lenihan attending meetings of the Anglo-Irish Conference which the Republic of Ireland's Foreign Minister and the British Secretary of State for Northern Ireland co-chaired.

== Liver transplant ==
Lenihan's last period as Minister for Foreign Affairs was overshadowed by his serious ill-health. A long-standing liver problem had developed into a life-threatening issue requiring a liver transplant. Lenihan, previously a large-framed man, had been reduced to a bone-thin jaundiced-looking shadow of his former self, so ill-looking that the Secretary of State for Northern Ireland, Tom King, said afterwards that on seeing Lenihan at an Anglo-Irish Conference meeting, he had speculated as to whether Lenihan would die at the meeting. In May 1989, Lenihan underwent the liver transplant at Mayo Clinic in the United States. In his absence he was re-elected to the Dáil in the 1989 general election for Dublin West, after which, while remaining Tánaiste, he was made Minister for Defence. Lenihan returned to Irish politics with a new lease of life. When he entered the Dáil chamber he received an ovation, an indication of his personal cross-party popularity.

It was revealed subsequently that Lenihan's operation was partly paid for through fundraising by Taoiseach Charles Haughey, from businessmen with Fianna Fáil links. In evidence to the Moriarty Tribunal investigating Haughey's finances, it was established that much of the money raised but not ultimately needed for the operation was redirected by Haughey into his own personal bank account. Haughey was revealed in the 2006 tribunal report to have been engaged in numerous acts of corruption, to finance a lifestyle considerably in excess of his earnings as a politician.

== Presidential candidate ==
In January 1990, leaks to the media suggested that Lenihan was considering seeking the Fianna Fáil nomination in the 1990 presidential election, which was due in November 1990. Speculation abounded that this was part of a plan to discourage other parties from running candidates in the belief that Lenihan would prove unbeatable and so get the office unopposed. Labour Party leader Dick Spring indicated that Labour would run a candidate for the presidency, even if he had to stand himself. Ultimately, Labour chose former Senator Mary Robinson as its candidate.

Lenihan was generally perceived as an unbeatable candidate, though he did receive a late challenge for the nomination from cabinet colleague John Wilson. (Note: Fears grew among the party leadership that the party, in a minority government, would have great difficulty holding Lenihan's seat in a by-election, whereas Wilson had a 'safe seat' the party would have no difficulty in holding.) However, in September 1990, Lenihan was formally nominated as his party's candidate. The main opposition party, Fine Gael chose Austin Currie, a TD and former Northern Ireland cabinet minister, to be its candidate.

=== The Lenihan tape ===
The issue of Lenihan's trustworthiness became the central issue of the second half of the presidential campaign.

In January 1982, Taoiseach Garret FitzGerald had asked President Patrick Hillery, a former government colleague of Lenihan's, to dissolve the Dáil, a request which Hillery granted. (Note: Under the Constitution of Ireland, the President has the absolute right under the consultation not to grant the Taoiseach a dissolution of the Dáil.) If President Hillery had refused a dissolution, Charles Haughey as Leader of the Opposition, could have formed an alternative government and strengthened his own embattled position as leader of Fianna Fáil. Subsequently, it was reported in books by authors Stephen O'Byrnes and Raymond Smith, and by many political journalists in newspaper articles (some of whom had Lenihan as their source) that Lenihan had been one of the people who had made phone calls to Áras an Uachtaráin, the President's official residence, on the night in question, in order to persuade or pressure Hillery to refuse a dissolution. Lenihan himself never denied his involvement in the incident. Indeed, in May 1990, he confirmed his participation in an on-the-record interview with a postgraduate student and journalist, Jim Duffy. In September 1990, The Irish Times carried a series of articles on the presidency, one of which mentioned in passing the role of Lenihan, Sylvester Barrett, and Charles Haughey in making the calls. The article in question was sourced from Duffy's interview.

In October 1990, in the midst of the presidential election, Lenihan suddenly changed his account. In an interview in the Irish Press and on RTÉ's Questions and Answers programme, he insisted that he had had "no hand, act or part" in efforts to pressure President Hillery. The Irish Times, which was aware that Lenihan himself was Duffy's source for the original article claim, published, with Duffy's agreement, a newspaper story confirming that Lenihan had indeed made the controversial phone calls to Áras an Uachtaráin. When Lenihan's campaign manager, Bertie Ahern, named Duffy on radio as someone who had interviewed Lenihan back in May, a political storm erupted in which the journalist was put under siege by the media and Fianna Fáil, leading to his reluctant decision, after consulting with lawyers, to release the portion of the tape in which Lenihan talked about the events of January 1982.

=== "On mature recollection" ===
Lenihan's reaction severely damaged his credibility. He appeared on a live TV news bulletin, and, looking into the camera, pleaded with the Irish people to believe him, stating that "on mature recollection" he had not phoned President Hillery and his account to Duffy had been wrong. He then requested an audience with President Hillery to seek his confirmation that he made no phone calls. No audience was granted, and his campaign manager Bertie Ahern withdrew the request – though, in a sign of the chaos enveloping the campaign, Lenihan told journalist Charlie Bird that the request was still there until the journalist played back his interview with Ahern, after which Lenihan recorded a new soundbite explaining why the request had been withdrawn. (Note: RTÉ showed the image of Lenihan listening to the RTÉ reporter's tape recorder but the fact that he was listening to Ahern's interview before re-recording his own was not explained to viewers and only became known subsequently.)

At this point, the opposition put down a motion of no confidence in the government. The Progressive Democrats, Fianna Fáil's coalition partner, told Taoiseach Charles Haughey that unless Lenihan was either dismissed or an inquiry set up into the events of January 1982, it would pull out of government, support the opposition motion and force a general election. Though insisting that he would put no pressure on Lenihan, "my friend of thirty years", Haughey drew up a letter of resignation for Lenihan's signature. Lenihan refused to sign, and Haughey formally advised President Hillery to dismiss Lenihan from the government – which Hillery, as was required constitutionally, duly did, despite grave personal concerns. Many in Fianna Fáil were disgusted with what they saw as Haughey's betrayal of his old friend, and argued that the Progressive Democrats' threat to bring down the government was a mere bluff. This would be the first in a series of events generating discontent in Fianna Fáil with Haughey's leadership, culminating in his downfall in early 1992.

=== Pádraig Flynn's attack on Mary Robinson ===
Lenihan's dismissal led to an immediate collapse in his popularity (from mid 40% to 31% almost overnight), though his standing in the polls subsequently improved. A personal attack by former cabinet colleague Pádraig Flynn on Mary Robinson, in which he accused her of showing a "new-found interest" in her family, backfired and destroyed Lenihan's campaign. Women voters rallied to Robinson and abandoned the Lenihan campaign in droves.

=== The result ===
In spite of his troubled campaign, Lenihan won the largest number of first-preference votes. However, most of the votes that initially went to Austin Currie, the third-placed candidate, transferred to Mary Robinson on the second count, in what was widely seen as a pact between Fine Gael and the Labour Party. As a result, Lenihan became the first Fianna Fáil candidate to lose an Irish presidential election.

== Out of government ==
Lenihan remained active in politics right up to his death in 1995. Bitter at what he saw as his betrayal by the Progressive Democrats, he campaigned for Fianna Fáil to go into coalition with the Labour Party instead, something which happened after the 1992 general election. He also occasionally reviewed books, which showed an intellect that he had suppressed in his public persona as a politician.

== Death ==
Lenihan's health again deteriorated and he died in 1995, at the age of 64. The resulting by-election was won by his son Brian Lenihan Jnr.

In the 1997 general election another son, Conor Lenihan, was elected to Dáil Éireann.

== Brian Lenihan Memorial Lecture ==
A Brian Lenihan Memorial Lecture is delivered annually in the Irish Institute of European Affairs. The first guest speaker was the Roy Jenkins (formerly British Home Secretary and President of the European Commission). In 2001, the lecture was given by Chris Patten, former British Conservative Party Minister and MP, former Governor of Hong Kong and then British European Commissioner.

== Footnotes ==
Political offices
New office	Parliamentary Secretary to the Minister for Lands; 1961–1964	Succeeded by George Colley
Preceded by Charles Haughey	Parliamentary Secretary to the Minister for Justice; 1961–1964	Office abolished
Preceded by Charles Haughey	Minister for Justice; 1964–1968	Succeeded by Mícheál Ó Móráin
Preceded by Donogh O'Malley	Minister for Education; 1968–1969	Succeeded by Pádraig Faulkner
Preceded by Erskine H. Childers	Minister for Transport and Power; 1969–1973	Succeeded by Michael O'Kennedy
Preceded by Patrick Hillery	Minister for Foreign Affairs; 1973	Succeeded by Garret FitzGerald
Preceded by Mark Clinton	Minister for Fisheries; 1977–1979	Succeeded by Paddy Power
Preceded by Michael O'Kennedy	Minister for Foreign Affairs; 1979–1981	Succeeded by John Kelly
Preceded by Alan Dukes	Minister for Agriculture; 1982	Succeeded by Austin Deasy
Preceded by Peter Barry	Tánaiste; 1987–1990	Succeeded by John Wilson
Preceded by Peter Barry	Minister for Foreign Affairs; 1987–1989	Succeeded by Gerry Collins
Preceded by Michael J. Noonan	Minister for Defence; 1989–1990	Succeeded by Brendan Daly
Party political offices
Preceded by Ray MacSharry	Deputy leader of Fianna Fáil; 1983–1990	Succeeded by John Wilson

Dáil	Election	Deputy (Party)	Deputy (Party)	Deputy (Party)	Deputy (Party)
4th	1923	George Noble Plunkett (Rep)	Henry Finlay (CnaG)	Gerald Boland (Rep)	Andrew Lavin (CnaG)
4th	1925 by-election	George Noble Plunkett (Rep)	Martin Conlon (CnaG)	Gerald Boland (Rep)	Andrew Lavin (CnaG)
5th	1927 (Jun)	Patrick O'Dowd (FF)	Martin Conlon (CnaG)	Gerald Boland (FF)	Michael Brennan (Ind.)
6th	1927 (Sep)	Patrick O'Dowd (FF)	Martin Conlon (CnaG)	Gerald Boland (FF)	Michael Brennan (Ind.)
7th	1932	Daniel O'Rourke (FF)	Martin Conlon (CnaG)	Gerald Boland (FF)	Frank MacDermot (NCP)
8th	1933	Patrick O'Dowd (FF)	Michael Brennan (CnaG)	Gerald Boland (FF)	Frank MacDermot (NCP)
9th	1937	Michael Brennan (FG)	Daniel O'Rourke (FF)	Gerald Boland (FF)	3 seats 1937–1948
10th	1938	Michael Brennan (FG)	Daniel O'Rourke (FF)	Gerald Boland (FF)	3 seats 1937–1948
11th	1943	John Meighan (CnaT)	John Beirne (CnaT)	Gerald Boland (FF)	3 seats 1937–1948
12th	1944	Daniel O'Rourke (FF)	John Beirne (CnaT)	Gerald Boland (FF)	3 seats 1937–1948
13th	1948	Daniel O'Rourke (FF)	John Beirne (CnaT)	Gerald Boland (FF)	Jack McQuillan (CnaP)
14th	1951	John Finan (CnaT)	John Beirne (CnaT)	Gerald Boland (FF)	Jack McQuillan (Ind.)
15th	1954	James Burke (FG)	John Beirne (CnaT)	Gerald Boland (FF)	Jack McQuillan (Ind.)
16th	1957	James Burke (FG)	John Beirne (CnaT)	Gerald Boland (FF)	Jack McQuillan (Ind.)
17th	1961	James Burke (FG)	Patrick J. Reynolds (FG)	Brian Lenihan Snr (FF)	Jack McQuillan (NPD)
17th	1964 by-election	Joan Burke (FG)	Patrick J. Reynolds (FG)	Brian Lenihan Snr (FF)	Jack McQuillan (NPD)
18th	1965	Joan Burke (FG)	Patrick J. Reynolds (FG)	Brian Lenihan Snr (FF)	Hugh Gibbons (FF)
19th	1969	Constituency abolished. See Roscommon–Leitrim			

Dáil	Election	Deputy (Party)	Deputy (Party)	Deputy (Party)
22nd	1981	Terry Leyden (FF)	Seán Doherty (FF)	John Connor (FG)
23rd	1982 (Feb)	Terry Leyden (FF)	Seán Doherty (FF)	Liam Naughten (FG)
24th	1982 (Nov)	Terry Leyden (FF)	Seán Doherty (FF)	Liam Naughten (FG)
25th	1987	Terry Leyden (FF)	Seán Doherty (FF)	Liam Naughten (FG)
26th	1989	Terry Leyden (FF)	Tom Foxe (Ind.)	John Connor (FG)
27th	1992	Constituency abolished. See Longford–Roscommon		

Dáil	Election	Deputy (Party)	Deputy (Party)	Deputy (Party)
19th	1969	Hugh Gibbons (FF)	Brian Lenihan (FF)	Joan Burke (FG)
20th	1973	Hugh Gibbons (FF)	Patrick J. Reynolds (FG)	Joan Burke (FG)
21st	1977	Terry Leyden (FF)	Seán Doherty (FF)	Joan Burke (FG)
22nd	1981	Constituency abolished. See Roscommon and Sligo–Leitrim		

Dáil	Election	Deputy (Party)	Deputy (Party)	Deputy (Party)
21st	1977	Liam Lawlor (FF)	Brian Lenihan (FF)	Mark Clinton (FG)
22nd	1981	Constituency abolished		

Dáil	Election	Deputy (Party)	Deputy (Party)	Deputy (Party)	Deputy (Party)	Deputy (Party)
22nd	1981	Jim Mitchell (FG)	Brian Lenihan Snr (FF)	Richard Burke (FG)	Eileen Lemass (FF)	Brian Fleming (FG)
23rd	1982 (Feb)	Jim Mitchell (FG)	Brian Lenihan Snr (FF)	Richard Burke (FG)	Liam Lawlor (FF)	Brian Fleming (FG)
23rd	1982 by-election	Jim Mitchell (FG)	Brian Lenihan Snr (FF)	Liam Skelly (FG)	Liam Lawlor (FF)	Brian Fleming (FG)
24th	1982 (Nov)	Jim Mitchell (FG)	Brian Lenihan Snr (FF)	Liam Skelly (FG)	Eileen Lemass (FF)	Tomás Mac Giolla (WP)
25th	1987	Jim Mitchell (FG)	Brian Lenihan Snr (FF)	Pat O'Malley (PDs)	Liam Lawlor (FF)	Tomás Mac Giolla (WP)
26th	1989	Jim Mitchell (FG)	Brian Lenihan Snr (FF)	Austin Currie (FG)	Liam Lawlor (FF)	Tomás Mac Giolla (WP)
27th	1992	Joan Burton (Lab)	Brian Lenihan Snr (FF)	Austin Currie (FG)	Liam Lawlor (FF)	4 seats 1992–2002
27th	1996 by-election	Joan Burton (Lab)	Brian Lenihan Jnr (FF)	Austin Currie (FG)	Liam Lawlor (FF)	4 seats 1992–2002
28th	1997	Joe Higgins (SP)	Brian Lenihan Jnr (FF)	Austin Currie (FG)	Liam Lawlor (FF)	4 seats 1992–2002
29th	2002	Joe Higgins (SP)	Brian Lenihan Jnr (FF)	Joan Burton (Lab)	3 seats 2002–2011	
30th	2007	Leo Varadkar (FG)	Brian Lenihan Jnr (FF)	Joan Burton (Lab)	3 seats 2002–2011	
31st	2011	Leo Varadkar (FG)	Brian Lenihan Jnr (FF)	Joan Burton (Lab)	Joe Higgins (SP)	4 seats 2011–2024
31st	2011 by-election	Leo Varadkar (FG)	Patrick Nulty (Lab)	Joan Burton (Lab)	Joe Higgins (SP)	4 seats 2011–2024
31st	2014 by-election	Leo Varadkar (FG)	Ruth Coppinger (SP)	Joan Burton (Lab)	Joe Higgins (SP)	4 seats 2011–2024
32nd	2016	Leo Varadkar (FG)	Ruth Coppinger (AAA–PBP)	Joan Burton (Lab)	Jack Chambers (FF)	4 seats 2011–2024
33rd	2020	Leo Varadkar (FG)	Paul Donnelly (SF)	Roderic O'Gorman (GP)	Jack Chambers (FF)	4 seats 2011–2024
34th	2024	Emer Currie (FG)	Paul Donnelly (SF)	Roderic O'Gorman (GP)	Jack Chambers (FF)	Ruth Coppinger (PBP–S)
