= 23rd government of Ireland =

Government of Ireland 1993 to 1994

- Government of Ireland
- Date formed: 12 January 1993
- Date dissolved: 15 December 1994

People and organisations
- President: Mary Robinson
- Taoiseach: Albert Reynolds
- Tánaiste: Dick Spring; Bertie Ahern (from Nov. 1994)
- Total no. of members: 15
- Member parties: Fianna Fáil; Labour Party (left Nov. 1994)
- Status in legislature: Coalition
- Opposition party: Fine Gael
- Opposition leader: John Bruton

History
- Election: 1992 general election
- Legislature terms: 27th Dáil; 20th Seanad
- Predecessor: 22nd government
- Successor: 24th government

The 23rd government of Ireland (12 January 1993 – 15 December 1994) was the government formed following the 1992 general election to the 27th Dáil held on 25 November 1992. It was a coalition of Fianna Fáil, with leader Albert Reynolds as Taoiseach, and the Labour Party, with leader Dick Spring as Tánaiste. It was the first time that these two parties were in government together; on each previous occasion Labour was in government, it was a junior coalition party with Fine Gael. The government lasted for 1 year, 309 days from its appointment until its resignation on 17 November 1994, and continued to carry out its duties for a further 28 days until the appointment of its successor, giving a total of 1 year, 337 days.

The 27th Dáil lasted until 1997, but the first government fell in 1994 after the breakdown of relations between the two parties. It was succeeded in December 1994 by the 24th government, a coalition of Fine Gael, with leader John Bruton as Taoiseach, Labour, with Dick Spring serving again as Tánaiste, and Democratic Left, led by Proinsias De Rossa. This was the only time a government with a new coalition of parties was formed within a single Dáil term.

== Nomination of Taoiseach ==
The 27th Dáil first met on 14 December 1992. In the debate on the nomination of Taoiseach, Fianna Fáil leader and outgoing Taoiseach Albert Reynolds, Fine Gael leader John Bruton and Labour Party leader Dick Spring were each proposed. None of these proposals were passed by the Dáil: Reynolds received 68 votes in favour with 94 against, Bruton received 55 in favour to 107 against, and Spring received 39 in favour to 122 against. Reynolds resigned as Taoiseach and continued in a caretaker capacity.

On 12 January 1993, Albert Reynolds and John Bruton were again proposed for the nomination of the Dáil for the position of Taoiseach, and on this occasion, the nomination of Reynolds was successful by 102 votes to 60. Reynolds was appointed as Taoiseach by President Mary Robinson.

12 January 1993; Nomination of Albert Reynolds (FF) as Taoiseach; Motion proposed by Máire Geoghegan-Quinn and seconded by Dick Spring; Absolute majority: 84/166
Vote	Parties	Votes
Yes	Fianna Fáil (67), Labour Party (33), Independent Fianna Fáil (1), Independent (1)	102 / 166
No	Fine Gael (44), Progressive Democrats (10), Democratic Left (4), Green Party (1), Independent (1)	60 / 166
Absent or not voting	Fine Gael (1), Independent (1), Ceann Comhairle (1)	3 / 166
Vacant	1	1 / 166

== Government ministers ==
After his appointment as Taoiseach by the president, Albert Reynolds proposed the members of the government and they were approved by the Dáil. They were appointed by the president on the same day.

Office	Name	Term	Party
Taoiseach	Albert Reynolds	1993–1994	Fianna Fáil
Tánaiste	Dick Spring	1993–1994	Labour Party
Minister for Foreign Affairs	Dick Spring	1993–1994	Labour Party
Minister for Finance	Bertie Ahern	1993–1994	Fianna Fáil
Minister for Social Welfare	Michael Woods	1993–1994	Fianna Fáil
Minister for Justice	Máire Geoghegan-Quinn	1993–1994	Fianna Fáil
Minister for Enterprise and Employment (Note: The Department of Industry and Commerce was renamed as the Department of Enterprise and Employment on 20 January 1993.)	Ruairi Quinn	1993–1994	Labour
Minister for the Environment	Michael Smith	1993–1994	Fianna Fáil
Minister for Defence	David Andrews	1993–1994	Fianna Fáil
Minister for the Marine	David Andrews	1993–1994	Fianna Fáil
Minister for Agriculture, Food and Forestry (Note: The Department of Agriculture and Food was renamed as the Department of Agriculture, Food and Forestry on 21 January 1993.)	Joe Walsh	1993–1994	Fianna Fáil
Minister for Tourism and Trade (Note: The Department of Energy was renamed as the Department of Tourism and Trade on 22 January 1993.)	Charlie McCreevy (Note: McCreevy had initially been appointed as Minister for Tourism, Transport and Communications and was re-assigned after the transfer of departmental function.)	1993–1994	Fianna Fáil
Minister for Transport, Energy and Communications (Note: The Department of Tourism, Transport and Communications was renamed as the Department of Transport, Energy and Communications on 22 January 1993.)	Brian Cowen (Note: Cowen had initially been appointed as Minister for Energy and was re-assigned after the transfer of departmental functions.)	1993–1994	Fianna Fáil
Minister for Equality and Law Reform (Note: The Department of Labour was renamed as the Department of Equality and Law Reform on 21 January 1993.)	Mervyn Taylor	1993–1994	Labour
Minister for Arts, Culture and the Gaeltacht (Note: The Department of the Gaeltacht was renamed as the Department of Arts, Culture and the Gaeltacht on 21 January 1993.)	Michael D. Higgins	1993–1994	Labour
Minister for Health	Brendan Howlin	1993–1994	Labour
Minister for Education	Niamh Bhreathnach	1993–1994	Labour
=== Changes 17 November 1994 === The Labour Party ministers resigned from government on 17 November 1994. Albert Reynolds resigned as Taoiseach and continued to serve in a caretaker capacity.
Minister for Foreign Affairs	Albert Reynolds	1994	Fianna Fáil
Tánaiste	Bertie Ahern	1994	Fianna Fáil
Minister for Arts, Culture and the Gaeltacht	Bertie Ahern	1994	Fianna Fáil
Minister for Health	Michael Woods	1994	Fianna Fáil
Minister for Equality and Law Reform	Máire Geoghegan-Quinn	1994	Fianna Fáil
Minister for Education	Michael Smith	1994	Fianna Fáil
Minister for Enterprise and Employment	Charlie McCreevy	1994	Fianna Fáil

== Attorney General ==
On 12 January 1993 Harry Whelehan SC was appointed by the president as Attorney General on the nomination of the Taoiseach. He resigned as Attorney General on 11 November 1994 on his nomination as President of the High Court (a position he would serve in for only two days). On 11 November 1994, Eoghan Fitzsimons SC was appointed by the president as Attorney General on the nomination of the Taoiseach.

== Ministers of state ==
=== Appointment on 12 January 1993 === The government on the nomination of the Taoiseach appointed Noel Dempsey as Government Chief Whip. He sat at cabinet in this role.
Name	Department(s)	Responsibility	Party
Noel Dempsey	Taoiseach; Defence	Government Chief Whip	Fianna Fáil
=== Appointments on 14 January 1993 === On 14 January 1993, the government on the nomination of the Taoiseach appointed the other Ministers of State. This included an additional responsibility for Dempsey.
Name	Department(s)	Responsibility	Party
Noel Dempsey	Finance	Office of Public Works	Fianna Fáil
Tom Kitt	Taoiseach; Foreign Affairs	European Affairs and Overseas development assistance	Fianna Fáil
Noel Treacy	Taoiseach; Finance; Transport, Energy and Communications	Energy	Fianna Fáil
Mary O'Rourke	Enterprise and Employment	Labour affairs	Fianna Fáil
Séamus Brennan	Enterprise and Employment	Commerce and technology	Fianna Fáil
Pat "the Cope" Gallagher	Arts, Culture and the Gaeltacht	Gaeltacht	Fianna Fáil
Eithne FitzGerald	Finance; Office of the Tánaiste	National Development Plan	Labour
Liam Aylward	Education	Youth and sport	Fianna Fáil
Liam Hyland	Agriculture, Food and Forestry	Forestry and rural development	Fianna Fáil
Brian O'Shea	Agriculture, Food and Forestry	Food and horticulture	Labour
Willie O'Dea	Justice; Health		Fianna Fáil
John Browne	Environment	Environmental protection	Fianna Fáil
Emmet Stagg	Environment	Housing and urban renewal	Labour
Gerry O'Sullivan	Marine	Port development, safety and inland fisheries	Labour
Joan Burton	Social Welfare	Poverty, including EC Poverty Plans and the integration of the tax and social welfare codes	Labour
=== Change on 15 June 1994 === Resignation of Pat "the Cope" Gallagher as minister of state on his election to the European Parliament.
=== Change on 5 August 1994 === Death of Gerry O'Sullivan.
=== Change on 17 November 1994 === The ministers of state from the Labour Party resigned on 17 November 1994.

== Confidence in the government ==
After the sum of European Structural and Investment Funds allocated to Ireland was lower than previously announced, a motion of no confidence was proposed in the government. This was then debated on 28 October 1993 as a motion of confidence in the government, proposed by the Taoiseach. It was approved by a vote of 94 to 55.

=== Resignation of government ===
In November 1994, the Attorney General, Harry Whelehan was nominated by the government as President of the High Court. It emerged that he had failed to expedite the extradition of Fr Brendan Smyth to Northern Ireland for sexual offences committed against children. The appointment of Whelehan to the court despite this led to a motion of no confidence in the government. Reynolds responded on 16 November by proposing a motion reaffirming the confidence of the Dáil in the Taoiseach and the Government.

On the following day, 17 November, Labour withdrew from the government and Reynolds resigned as Taoiseach. The motion of confidence in the government was withdrawn. Reynolds and the Fianna Fáil ministers continued to carry on their duties until their successors were appointed on 15 December.
