= 1994 Irish government crisis =

Events leading to the collapse of the 23rd Irish government in 1994

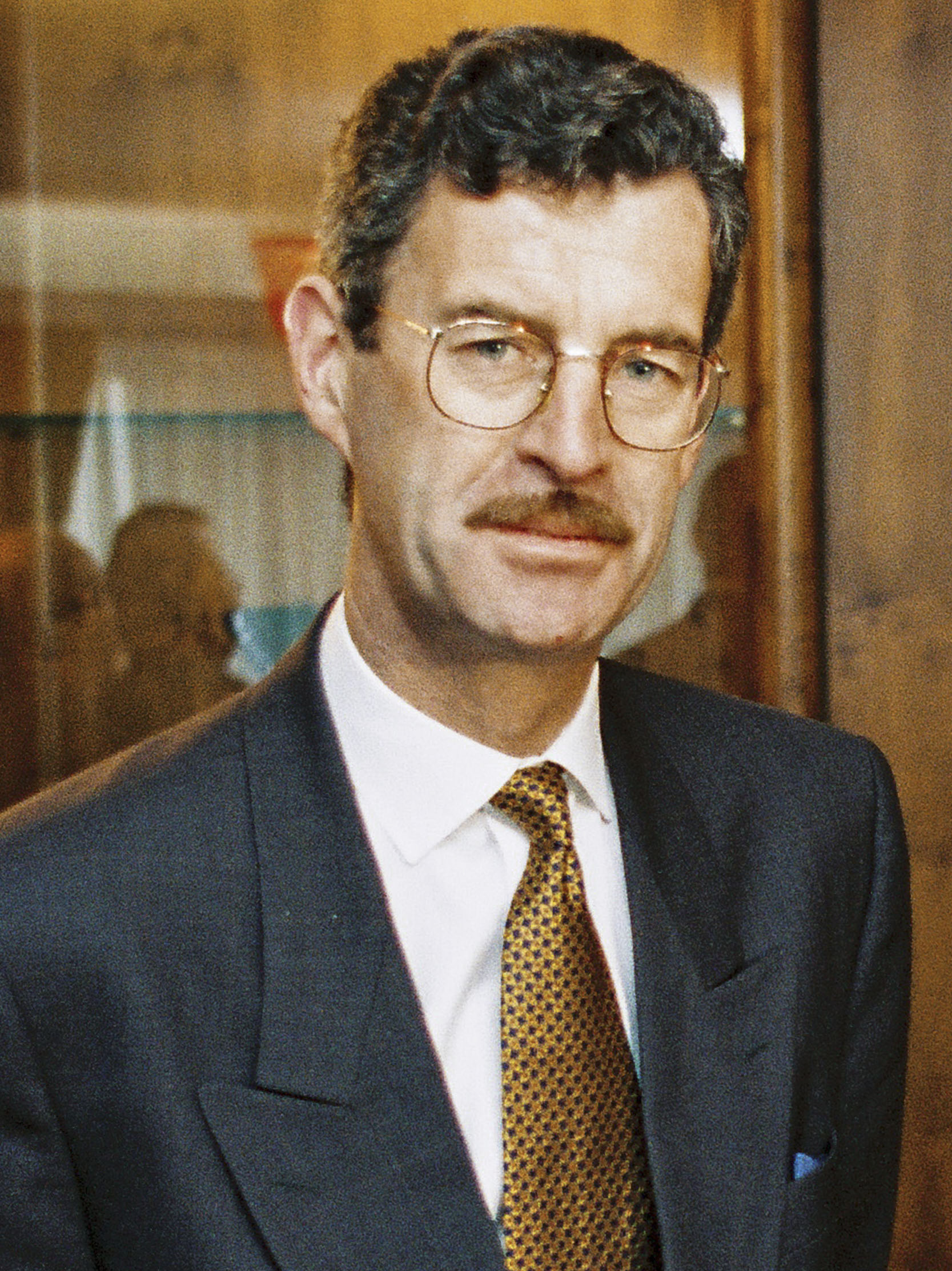
Leader of the Labour Party Dick Spring.

The 1994 Irish government crisis was a political event in the Republic of Ireland that occurred between November and December 1994. It saw the fracturing and eventual collapse of Taoiseach Albert Reynolds' governing coalition between Fianna Fáil and the Labour Party. However, no election was called and as a result, a new government was established between Fine Gael, Labour and Democratic Left, the first (and to date the only) such change in government in Ireland's history.

== Background ==
In 1992, the previous coalition between Fianna Fáil and the Progressive Democrats, also headed by Albert Reynolds, collapsed. This was caused by a similar deterioration in relations between the government parties, driven primarily in the mutual antipathy between Reynolds and Des O'Malley, leader of the PDs. Matters came to a head in late 1992 during an inquiry into corruption in Ireland's beef industry which implicated Reynolds and at which O'Malley provided evidence. During one hearing Reynolds dismissed O'Malley testimony and in effect accused him of perjury, which caused the PDs to leave government. The Reynolds government fell on a motion of no confidence shortly after.

=== Fianna Fáil-Labour coalition ===
The results of the subsequent election were considered particularly bad for Fianna Fáil, which dropped 10 seats and fell to 39% of the vote, its worst result since the 1920s. In contrast, the Labour party under Dick Spring had maintained a strongly anti-Fianna Fáil line since the 1980s and did extremely well as a result of Reynold's unpopularity, gaining 17 seats. While it was expected that Fianna Fáil would lose office as a result, disagreements between Fine Gael and Labour over coalition partners and the position of Taoiseach prevented an alternative government being formed.

Reynolds offered Labour a coalition deal that would allow the party to implement its manifesto, at the cost of reneging on its promise to remove Fianna Fáil from power. This deal was sweetened by the unexpectedly large share of the EU structural funds Reynolds had managed to negotiate in late 1992.

After what was then the longest government formation in Irish history, the government took office with the largest majority then held by an Irish government. Despite this majority, the coalition proved turbulent. Lingering issues around the Beef tribunal caused tension, especially the publication of its report. A controversial tax amnesty in early 1993 also proved divisive and prompted criticism towards Labour for allowing its implementation.

Another factor raised by Fergus Finlay (a senior advisor to Labour) was the personalities of Spring and Reynolds which he viewed as incompatible. Similarly, Seán Duignan liken it to his relationship with O'Malley: Reynolds was quick to offend and did little to try to maintain a friendly atmosphere with his deputy.

== Crisis ==
=== Appointment of Harry Whelehan ===
Thomas Finlay retired as Chief Justice of Ireland in September 1994, and Liam Hamilton was promoted from President of the High Court to replace him. In early 1994, when the government was considering forthcoming judicial appointments, the Attorney General Harry Whelehan expressed an interest in becoming President of the High Court and a Judge of the High Court, to which Reynolds gave a personal commitment. This was opposed by Dick Spring, not only due to the quid pro quo nature of the arrangement but also due to Whelehan's controversial role in the X Case, where he attempted to prevent a 14-year-old girl from traveling to the UK in order to undergo an abortion after she had been raped. In the autumn of 1994, the row intensified as neither Reynolds nor Spring appeared to back down.

=== Brendan Smyth affair ===
In March 1993, the Royal Ulster Constabulary requested the extradition of Brendan Smyth, a priest arrested for child sex abuse. On 6 October 1994, an edition of UTV's Counterpoint programme revealed that eight months later, in November 1993, the request was still at the Office of the Attorney General, when the RUC informed the Office that Smyth had voluntarily given himself up in Northern Ireland. The programme suggested this delay was deliberate (possibly in view of Whelehan's conservative beliefs). These revelations caused public uproar with one poll showing less than one in 5 supported Whelehan's appointment.

In response, Whelehan stated he had not known of the case. The delay was variously blamed on short staffing in the office and the complexity of the case, which might fall under a previously unused provision of the law on extradition. Despite this, Reynolds proceeded to appoint Whelehan as President of the High Court, at a cabinet meeting from which Labour ministers were absent. Mary Robinson, the President of Ireland, confirmed his appointment the same day, and he took his oath of office from the Chief Justice on 15 November.This decision, combined with the Smyth revelations and their earlier opposition to Whelehan, prompted the Labour party to walk out from cabinet.

=== 15 November ===
Attempting to save his government, Reynolds requested that Whelehan prepare a memorandum on the Smyth case, which was delivered on 15 November 1994. This claimed the case was the first one to involve section 50 of the Extradition Act 1965 (inserted by section 2(1)(b) of the Extradition (Amendment) Act 1987).

In the Dáil on 15 November 1994, Reynolds summarised the report he had received from Whelehan and publicly expressed his regret towards overruling his coalition partner and "any inadvertent offence caused to the Tánaiste and his Labour Party colleagues".

It was later reported that Whelehan's successor as Attorney General, Eoghan Fitzsimons, had tried to persuade Whelehan to resign his judgeship, to no avail.

=== 16 November ===
This statement appeared to mollify Labour, who signed an agreement to renew the coalition on the morning of the 16th, just before a confidence motion tabled by the opposition was due to be voted on. What occurred subsequently is unclear, with conflicting accounts. It appears that Spring received a phone call from an unknown party, or otherwise received advice, informing him that there had been a precedent involving another paedophile cleric, John Anthony Duggan, which had been resolved promptly in 1992 by Whelehan after considering section 50 of the Extradition Act. Spring revealed this matter to the Dáil during the confidence debate, and announced the Labour party had withdrawn from the government in order to vote no confidence. Reynolds, facing defeat, nevertheless stated he regretted having appointed Whelehan, and criticised his failure to inform the government about the Duggan case. This was sharply attacked by the leader of Fine Gael, John Bruton as 'the merciless destruction of another man's reputation in order to save his own skin'.

At this point, the political atmosphere was described as 'feral' and serious rumours began to circulate inside and outside the Dáil. Pat Rabbite alleged that another unspecified document was circulating in the Attorney General's office that would 'rock the foundations of this society to its very roots'.

=== 17 November ===
After a mere two days in office, Whelehan finally resigned, stating he wished to "keep the judiciary out of politics". Reynolds ordered Fitzsimons to draft a report on his predecessor's conduct of the Smyth case. Facing defeat in the Dáil, Reynolds and his government also resigned, marking the formal end of the government.

== Attempts to form alternative government ==
After Albert Reynolds was replaced as Fianna Fáil leader by Bertie Ahern, there was speculation that Labour would rejoin Fianna Fáil in government. Negotiations began shortly after Reynold's resignation and continued until 6 December, despite the misgivings of many in the Labour party including Fergus Finlay. These talks were said to have proceeded to an advanced stage, with the relationship between Spring and Ahern noted as being more positive than that between Spring and Reynolds.

During the night of 5–6 December, Spring received Eoghan Fitzsimons' report on the Whelehan affair and discovered that senior members of Fianna Fáil, including Ahern, had knowledge of the Duggan case before 16 November but had both failed to inform Spring and had proceeded with Whelehan's appointment.

Spring informed Ahern he was breaking off negotiations and instead, Labour formed a government with Democratic Left and Fine Gael. By-election gains since 1992 meant the three parties had enough TDs between them for an overall majority. It is the only time to date that a new government was formed within the same Dáil term composed of different parties.
