= 2005 Kildare North by-election =

By-election to the 29th Dáil

- 11 March 2005
- Turnout: 25,524 (39.2%)
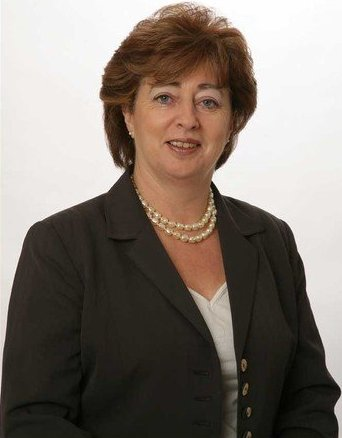
		Brady	Scully
Nominee	Catherine Murphy	Áine Brady	Darren Scully
Party	Independent	Fianna Fáil	Fine Gael
First preferences	5,985	6,201	4,630
Percentage	23.6%	24.5%	18.3%
Final count	12,256	9,818	–
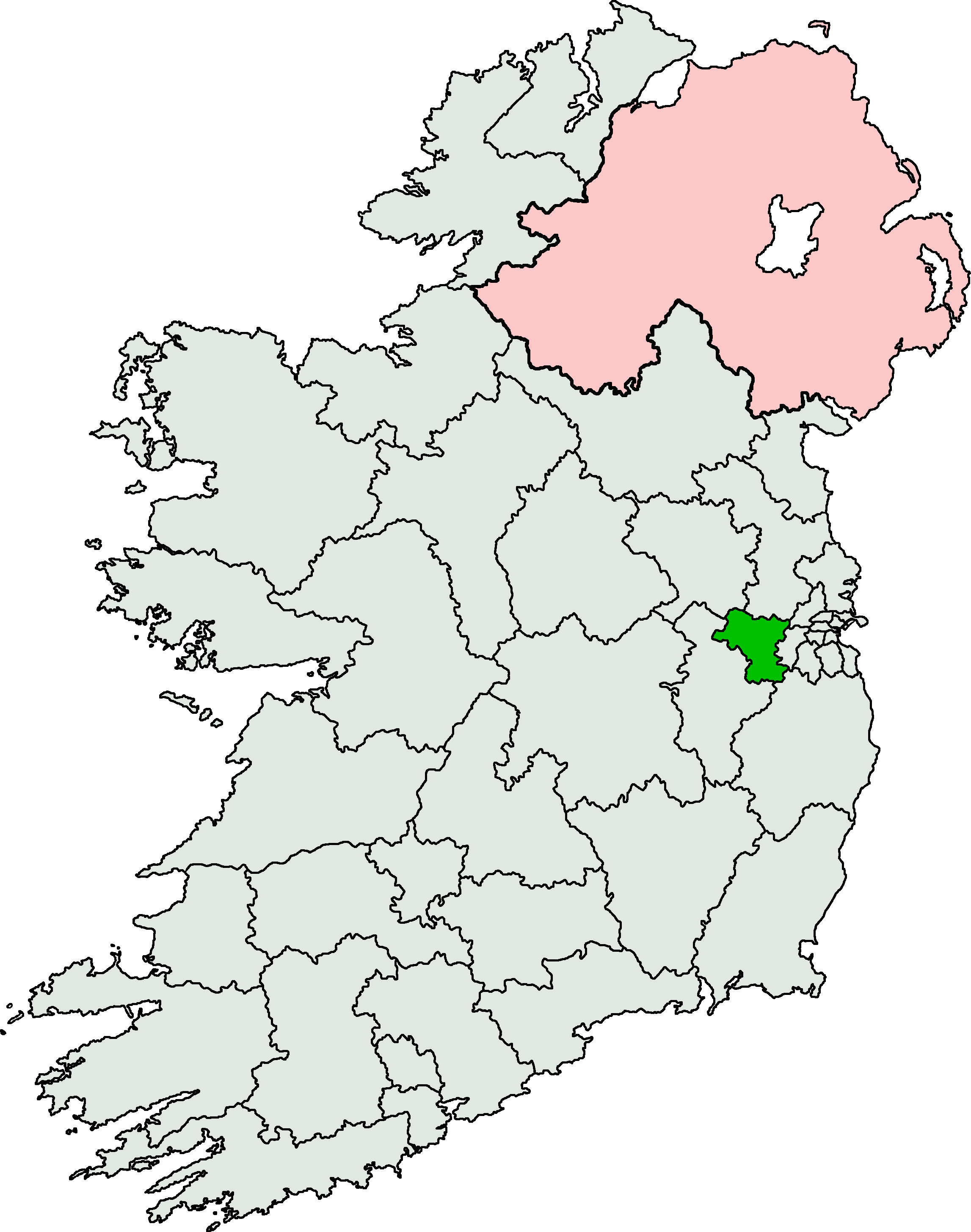
- Kildare North shown within Ireland
TD before election
Charlie McCreevy
Fianna Fáil
TD after election
Catherine Murphy
Independent

A Dáil by-election was held in the constituency of Kildare North in Ireland on Friday, 11 March 2005, to fill a vacancy in the 29th Dáil. It followed the resignation of Fianna Fáil Teachta Dála (TD) Charlie McCreevy on 31 October 2004 to take up his new position as Ireland's European Commissioner.

The writ of election to fill the vacancy was agreed by the Dáil on 15 February 2005.

On 15 February 2005, the campaign began when it was announced that polling would take place on 11 March 2005. Eight candidates contested the by-election, and it was won by the independent candidate Catherine Murphy. Her 23.6% share of the first-preference vote was the lowest recorded at any by-election since Patrick Kinane won the Tipperary by-election in October 1947 with a 21.4% share.

As a result of her election, Kildare North was the only constituency in the Republic of Ireland that did not have a TD from one of the government parties of Fianna Fáil or the Progressive Democrats. Murphy was also Kildare North's first female member of the Dáil.

It was held on the same day as the 2005 Meath by-election. Both were the final occasions which the Progressive Democrats contested by-elections.

== Background ==
Incumbent Fianna Fáil TD for the constituency, Charlie McCreevy, was appointed as Ireland's European Commissioner in October 2004, succeeding David Byrne. As a consequence, a by-election was to be held in Kildare North. McCreevy officially resigned on 22 November 2004.

== Candidate selection ==
=== Fianna Fáil ===
It was initially speculated that McCreevy's son, Charlie McCreevy Jnr, might seek to contest the seat for Fianna Fáil, though an arrest for public intoxication threw this into jeopardy. Other speculated candidates included McCreevy's personal assistant, Kildare County Council member Michael Fitzpatrick, fellow county councillors Liam Doyle and Willie Callaghan, and Leixlip-based solicitor Paul Kelly, who had narrowly missed out on election at the 2002 Irish general election. Kelly was considered the frontrunner for the nomination, but withdrew himself from consideration in mid-December, citing monetary and time constraints. The younger McCreevy announced in mid-January that he also would not be a candidate.

The eventual convention was contested by councillors Fitzpatrick, Doyle and Callaghan, former Democratic Left member Anthony Creevey and teacher Áine Brady, the wife of former Kildare TD Gerry Brady. The convention, seen to represent something of a proxy-war between McCreevy's wing of the party and Bertie Ahern's wing, saw Ahern's preferred candidate Brady selected as the candidate.

=== Fine Gael ===
A November article in the Irish Independent suggested that Fine Gael had been looking at a candidate similar to Mairead McGuinness for this campaign. In February, the party chose county councillor Darren Scully to run for them at this election. Senator Brian Hayes was Fine Gael's director of elections at the by-election.

=== Green Party ===
County councillors J. J. Power and Fintan McCarthy were seen as the frontrunners for the Green Party nomination. Power was selected as their candidate in December.

=== Labour ===
Naas-based county councillor Paddy MacNamara was selected as Labour's candidate on 28 December, defeating Gerry Browne from Leixlip at a selection convention.

=== Progressive Democrats ===
On 16 September 2004, the Progressive Democrats chose Senator Kate Walsh as their candidate at the by-election. Walsh had unsuccessfully contested the previous general election in Kildare North, receiving 11.9% of the vote.

=== Independents ===
In December, Seanán Ó Coistín announced he would run as an independent candidate. Catherine Murphy, a town councillor from Leixlip and three-time unsuccessful candidate in this constituency and Gerry Browne also contested the election.

== Campaign ==
An article in the Irish Independent highlighted that Fine Gael had started canvassing ahead of the by-election in November, before a selection convention had even been organised, while Isabel Hurley of the same paper commented in February that Fianna Fáil were in "serious trouble" having not selected a candidate by the start of February.

The ongoing controversy around minister Martin Cullen and alleged wrongdoing involving awarding of contracts to Monica Leech was said to have harmed Fianna Fáil's chances at the election. By February, Murphy was named the favourite by bookmakers.

== Result ==
2005 Kildare North by-election
Party	Candidate	FPv%	Count				
Party	Candidate	FPv%	1	2	3	4	5
Fianna Fáil	Áine Brady	24.5	6,201	6,255	7,265	8,133	9,818
Independent	Catherine Murphy	23.6	5,985	6,189	7,176	8,809	12,256
Fine Gael	Darren Scully	18.3	4,630	4,660	5,382	7,421	
Labour	Paddy MacNamara	17.8	4,507	4,545	5,199		
Progressive Democrats	Kate Walsh	7.9	2,006	2,023			
Green	J. J. Power	6.1	1,547	1,621			
Independent	Gerry Browne	0.9	226				
Independent	Seanán Ó Coistín	0.8	211				
Electorate: 65,080 Valid: 25,313 Spoilt: 211 (0.8%) Quota: 12,657 Turnout: 25,524 (39.2%)
