= Leonie Reynolds =

Irish judge (born 1968)

The Hon. Ms. Justice Leonie Reynolds

Judge of the High Court
- Incumbent
- Assumed office 21 October 2016
- Nominated by: Government of Ireland
- Appointed by: Michael D. Higgins

Judge of the Circuit Court
- In office 9 January 2010 – 21 October 2016
- Nominated by: Government of Ireland
- Appointed by: Mary McAleese

Personal details
- Born: 10 April 1968 (age 58) Roscommon, Ireland
- Spouse: Garret Baker SC (m. 2005)
- Parent: Albert Reynolds (father)
- Education: University College Dublin; King's Inns

Leonie Reynolds (born 10 April 1968) is an Irish judge who has served as a Judge of the High Court since October 2016. She previously served as a Judge of the Circuit Court from 2010 to 2016.

== Early life ==
Reynolds is the daughter of Albert Reynolds, former Taoiseach of Ireland. She was educated at University College Dublin from where she received a BA degree in 1989 and the King's Inns. She was called to the Irish Bar in 1993.

Reynolds married barrister Garret Baker in 2005.

== Judicial career ==
She was appointed as a judge of the Circuit Court in January 2010. On 27 July 2016, the Government of Ireland agreed in principle to nominate Reynolds, for appointment by the President of Ireland, as a judge of the High Court, once an expected vacancy arose.

She was a member of the Special Criminal Court between 2015 and 2016 and was formerly the judge in charge of the Chancery List of the High Court, which encompasses cases involving equity and company law. As of 2021, she is the judge in charge of the Jury and Garda Compensation lists.
