= Martin McAleese =

Irish senator and university leader

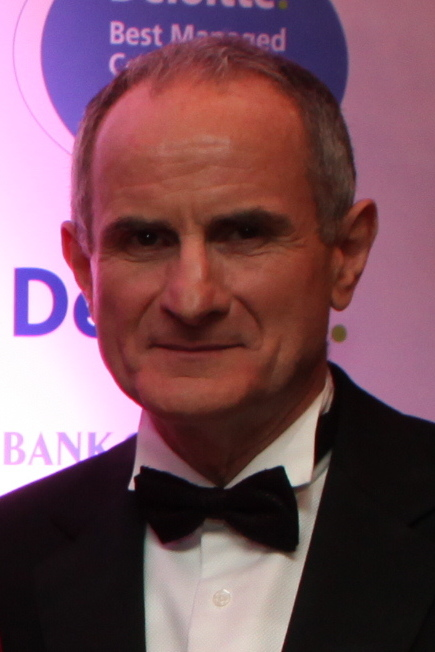
- McAleese in 2009

Chancellor of Dublin City University
- Incumbent
- Assumed office 21 August 2011
- President: Brian MacCraith
- Preceded by: David Byrne

Senator
- In office 25 May 2011 – 5 February 2013
- Constituency: Nominated by the Taoiseach

Personal details
- Born: Belfast, Northern Ireland
- Party: Independent
- Spouse: Mary McAleese (m. 1976)
- Children: 3
- Education: Queen's University Belfast; Trinity College Dublin

Martin McAleese is an Irish politician, dentist and accountant who has served as the Chancellor of Dublin City University since August 2011. He served as a Senator from 2011 to 2013, after being Nominated by the Taoiseach. He is the husband of former president of Ireland, Mary McAleese.

== Early life and education ==
Martin McAleese was born in Belfast. He was educated at St Mary's Christian Brothers' Grammar School, Belfast. He then studied at Queen's University Belfast, obtaining an honours Bachelor of Science in Physics. He played Gaelic football for the Antrim Minors and was captain of the team in 1969. In 1972, after he graduated he moved to Dublin and trained there as an accountant with the chartered accountancy firm of Stokes, Kennedy, Crowley.

In 1980, he returned to full-time education at Trinity College Dublin, to study as a dentist, subsequently moving back, with his family, to Northern Ireland, where he practised as a dentist in Crossmaglen and Bessbrook, County Armagh.

== Public service career ==
While his wife served as President of Ireland, McAleese initiated a series of meetings with senior Ulster loyalist paramilitary leaders to pursue peace negotiations. These actions did not take place without controversy, but have been widely viewed as instrumental in bringing loyalist paramilitary groups to peace talks.

In May 2011, McAleese was appointed as a Senator by the Taoiseach Enda Kenny. In August 2011, he was appointed the Chancellor of Dublin City University, taking over from David Byrne.

On 1 February 2013, McAleese announced his intention to resign as a member of Seanad Éireann.

McAleese accepted an appointment as Chairman of the Inter-Departmental Committee which was set up by the Government of Ireland to investigate the Magdalene laundries. His findings have been criticised by some survivors and researchers from the Magdalene Names project.

On 18–19 October 2014, McAleese attended the One Young World Summit in Dublin as a keynote speaker. Here, he hosted a special session for the One Young World Peace and Conflict Resolution Project alongside former Ulster Defence Association (UDA) prisoner Jackie McDonald and former Irish Republican Army (IRA) prisoner Sean Murray. They addressed young people from 191 countries to share and develop ideas to strengthen efforts at conflict resolution in their own countries.

== Personal life ==
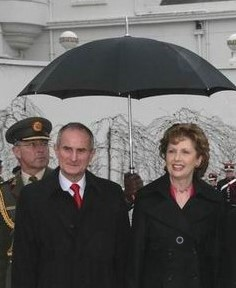
McAleese (left) with the President of Ireland and his wife, Mary McAleese (right) in 2008

McAleese married Mary Leneghan in 1976. The couple resided in Scholarstown, Dublin, for a short period, and then for almost twelve years near Ratoath, County Meath.

Martin and his wife Mary have three children. The family moved to Rostrevor, County Down, in 1987, when Martin set up practice in County Armagh.

Academic offices
Preceded by David Byrne	Chancellor of Dublin City University; August 2011–present	Incumbent
