= Eoghan Fitzsimons =

Irish barrister

Eoghan Fitzsimons SC

Attorney General of Ireland
- In office 11 November 1994 – 15 December 1994
- Taoiseach: Albert Reynolds
- Preceded by: Harry Whelehan
- Succeeded by: Dermot Gleeson

Personal details
- Born: 13 June 1943 (age 83) Dublin, Ireland
- Party: Fianna Fáil
- Education: University College Dublin; Yale University; Sorbonne University

Eoghan Fitzsimons SC (born 13 June 1943) is an Irish barrister who served as Attorney General of Ireland from November 1994 to December 1994.

He served as Attorney General of Ireland from 11 November to 15 December 1994. During his tenure as Attorney General, former Taoiseach Bertie Ahern described Fitzsimons's relationship with the government and then Taoiseach Albert Reynolds as "strained". He stood as a Fianna Fáil candidate for the Dublin Clontarf constituency at the 1977 general election but was not elected.

Legal offices
| Preceded by Harry Whelehan | Attorney General of Ireland; 1994 | Succeeded by Dermot Gleeson |
