= Charlie McCreevy =

Irish former politician (born 1949)

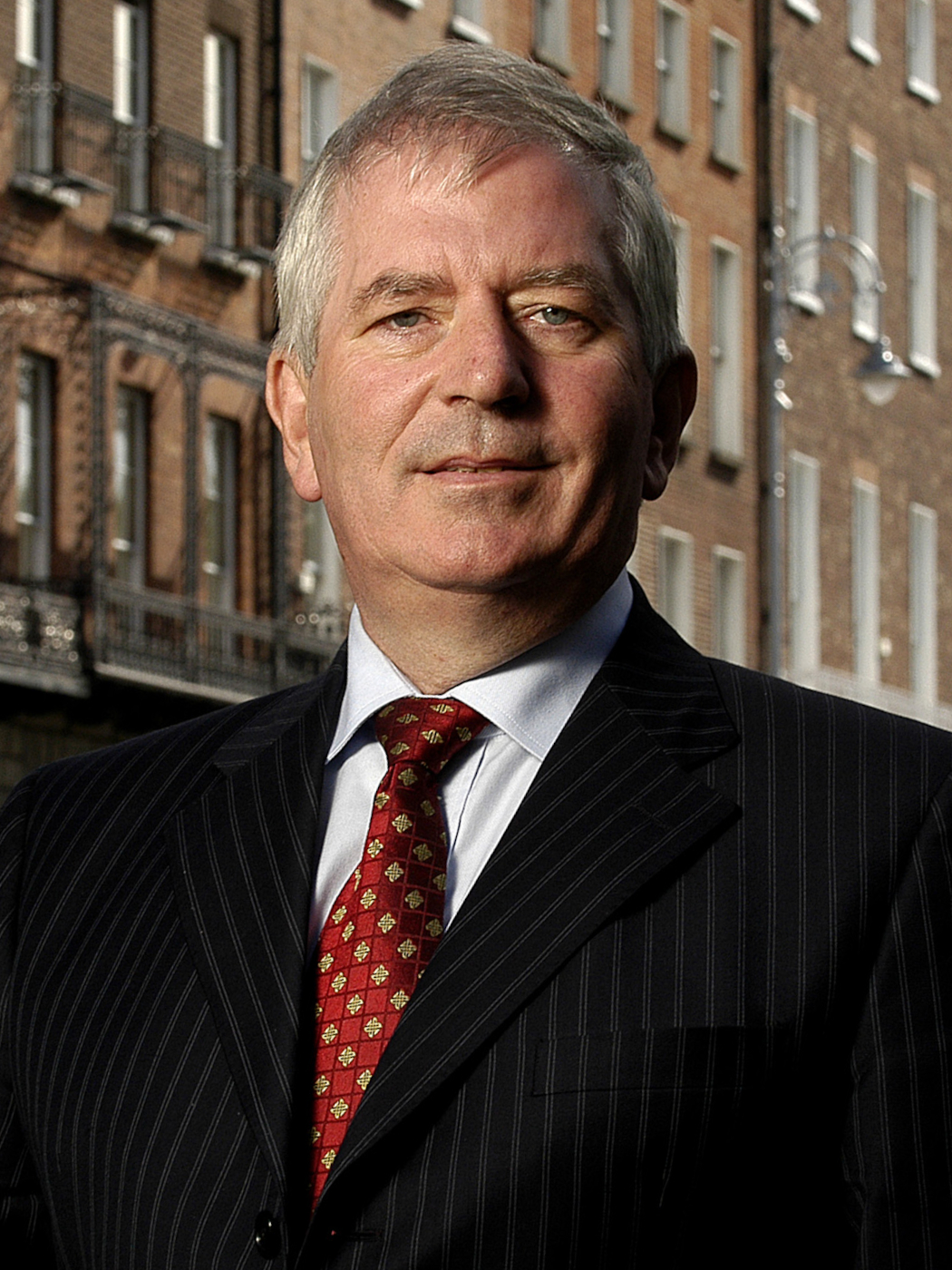
- McCreevy in 2004

European Commissioner for Internal Market and Services
- In office 22 November 2004 – 9 February 2010
- President: José Manuel Barroso
- Preceded by: Frits Bolkestein
- Succeeded by: Michel Barnier

Minister for Finance
- In office 26 June 1997 – 29 September 2004
- Taoiseach: Bertie Ahern
- Preceded by: Ruairi Quinn
- Succeeded by: Brian Cowen

Minister for Enterprise and Employment
- In office 17 November 1994 – 15 December 1994
- Taoiseach: Albert Reynolds
- Preceded by: Ruairi Quinn
- Succeeded by: Richard Bruton

Minister for Tourism and Trade
- In office 22 January 1993 – 15 December 1994
- Taoiseach: Albert Reynolds
- Preceded by: Brian Cowen
- Succeeded by: Enda Kenny

Minister for Social Welfare
- In office 11 February 1992 – 12 January 1993
- Taoiseach: Albert Reynolds
- Preceded by: Brendan Daly
- Succeeded by: Michael Woods

Teachta Dála
- In office June 1997 – 12 October 2004
- Constituency: Kildare North
- In office June 1977 – June 1997
- Constituency: Kildare

Personal details
- Born: 30 September 1949 (age 77) Sallins, County Kildare, Ireland
- Party: Fianna Fáil
- Spouse: Noeleen Halligan (m. 1987)
- Children: 1
- Education: University College Dublin

Charles McCreevy (born 30 September 1949) is an Irish former Fianna Fáil politician who served as European Commissioner for Internal Market and Services from 2004 to 2010, Minister for Finance from 1997 to 2004, Minister for Tourism and Trade from 1993 to 1994 and Minister for Social Welfare from 1992 to 1993. He served as a Teachta Dála (TD) for the Kildare constituency (and later the Kildare North constituency) from 1977 to 2004.

== Early life and career ==
Born in Sallins, County Kildare, McCreevy was educated locally at Naas by the Congregation of Christian Brothers at Naas C.B.S., and later at Gormanston College. He studied commerce at University College Dublin and went on to become a chartered accountant. His family background was modest, his father and ancestors since the late 18th century was a lock-keeper on the Grand Canal, a job carried on by his mother, after the death of his father, when McCreevy was four years old.

Thus, his post-compulsory education was attained by winning scholarships. His political career began with when he won a seat in the Kildare constituency at the 1977 general election, which was a landslide for Charles Haughey's supporters in Fianna Fáil and he was re-elected at every subsequent election until he joined the European Commission. Between 1979 and 1985, he served as an elected member of the Kildare County Council.

== Relationship with Charles Haughey ==
In the December 1979, Fianna Fáil leadership contest, McCreevy strongly supported the controversial Charles Haughey, who narrowly won the post. However, in a time of severe budgetary difficulties for Ireland, McCreevy soon became disillusioned with the new Taoiseach and his fiscal policies. In October 1982, McCreevy launched a motion of no-confidence in the party leader, which evolved into a leadership challenge by Desmond O'Malley. In an open ballot and supported by only 21 of his 79 colleagues (known as the "Gang of 22"), the motion failed and McCreevy was temporarily expelled from the parliamentary party.

In later years O'Malley was expelled from Fianna Fáil itself and formed the Progressive Democrats (PDs), espousing conservative fiscal policies. Although considered ideologically close to the PDs, and a personal friend of its erstwhile leader, Mary Harney, McCreevy chose to remain a member of Fianna Fáil, where he would eventually serve in joint FF-PD Governments.

== Early ministerial career ==
For his first 15 years as TD, while Haughey remained leader, McCreevy remained a backbencher. In 1992, Albert Reynolds became Taoiseach and McCreevy was appointed Minister for Social Welfare. In this role, he is principally remembered for a set of 12 cost-cutting measures, collectively termed the "dirty dozen", which were arguably minor in their direct impact but provided a major political headache for his party in the 1992 general election.

In 1993, he became Minister for Tourism and Trade, which he held until the government fell in December 1994. In opposition under new Fianna Fáil leader Bertie Ahern, McCreevy was appointed Opposition Spokesperson for Finance. In this role he was viewed as actively pro-enterprise, anti-spending and a key advocate for tax cuts.

== Minister for Finance ==
In 1997, Fianna Fáil returned to power and McCreevy became Minister for Finance. His period coincided with the era of the "Celtic Tiger", which saw the rapid growth of the Irish economy due to social partnership between employers, government and unions; increased female participation in the labour force, decades of tuition-free secondary education; targeting of foreign (primarily U.S.) direct investment; a low corporation tax rate; an English-speaking workforce only five time-zones from New York, and membership of the European Union – which provided payments for infrastructural development, export access to the Single Market and a Eurozone country.

McCreevy was a consistent advocate of cutting taxes and spending. As Minister for Finance, he had an opportunity to implement these policies. During his term in Finance, he made many changes to simplify the tax system and presided over Ireland's entry to Economic and Monetary Union of the European Union and later, the changeover to the Euro. He maintained a significant surplus during his seven years in Finance by forecasting tax takes which were lower than average. He simultaneously implemented a tax-cutting programme, major increases in health, education and pension spending as well as increasing investment in infrastructural development to 5% of GDP.

Unemployment fell from 10% to 4.4%. Real GDP growth fell steadily, however, from a peak of over 11% in 1997 when McCreevy took office to just over 4% in 2004. Real GDP growth across the full period of the Celtic Tiger represented by far the highest average of any western European country. Inflation was increased from 1.5% in 1997, to 5.5% in 2000, before falling steadily to just over 2% in 2004.

From 1997 to 2000, McCreevy cut Capital Gains Tax from 40% to 20%, and extended Section 23 Tax allowances to the Upper Shannon Area (against the advice of the Finance Department) in the Finance Acts of 1998 and 1999. These included special tax incentives targeted at the area covered by the pilot Rural Renewal Scheme, which was later criticised by the Heritage Council for being introduced without a "Baseline Audit" to inform the level and scale of development to be supported through the scheme, not identifying priority areas suitable for development, not providing any strategic protection for designated areas including the corridor of the River Shannon nor promoting the use of sustainable design and building materials in any new build or refurbishment project supported by the scheme.

These two measures of cutting Capital Gains Tax and providing tax incentives for property development in thinly populated rural areas have been partly responsible for the explosion in housing and commercial property speculation, which led ultimately to the collapse of the Irish banking system.

Frequently outspoken, McCreevy sometimes made comments which attracted controversy. For example, McCreevy once referred to the Irish health system as a "black hole" and reacted to the initial Irish rejection of the Nice Treaty as "a sign of a healthy democracy". He later explained this as reflecting a wake-up call to politicians and others who, like him, had expected an almost automatic Yes vote. McCreevy also prompted warnings from the European Commission, who claimed that his £2 billion tax giveaway in 2000 would be inflationary, and harmful to the Irish economy.

One of McCreevy's initiatives as Minister for Finance was decentralisation, involving moving government departments and state agencies to other parts of the country and moving 10,000 public servants with them. This target was never reached, with only 3,159 jobs having moved outside of Dublin and a wide range of state agencies having remained in Dublin. The project was abandoned in 2011, with the government having spent close to €100 million on offices that mostly remained unused.

In 2008, as Ireland entered recession, McCreevy's stewardship has been cited as one of the reasons why the 2008 financial crisis affected Ireland especially hard, due to his "light touch" regulation of the financial system. Former Taoiseach Garret FitzGerald attributed Ireland's dire economic state in 2009, on a series of "calamitous" government policy errors by the McCreevy as finance minister, who between the years of 2000 and 2003, boosted public spending by 48pc while cutting income tax.

In 2015, McCreevy gave evidence to the Oireachtas Joint Committee of Inquiry into the country's banking crisis and denied his policies as minister had contributed to the crisis. A legal warning was given to McCreevy at the Banking Inquiry after he refused to answer, when asked, if he believed there had been a property bubble, but then accepted that from 2003 there had been a property bubble.

== European Commissioner ==
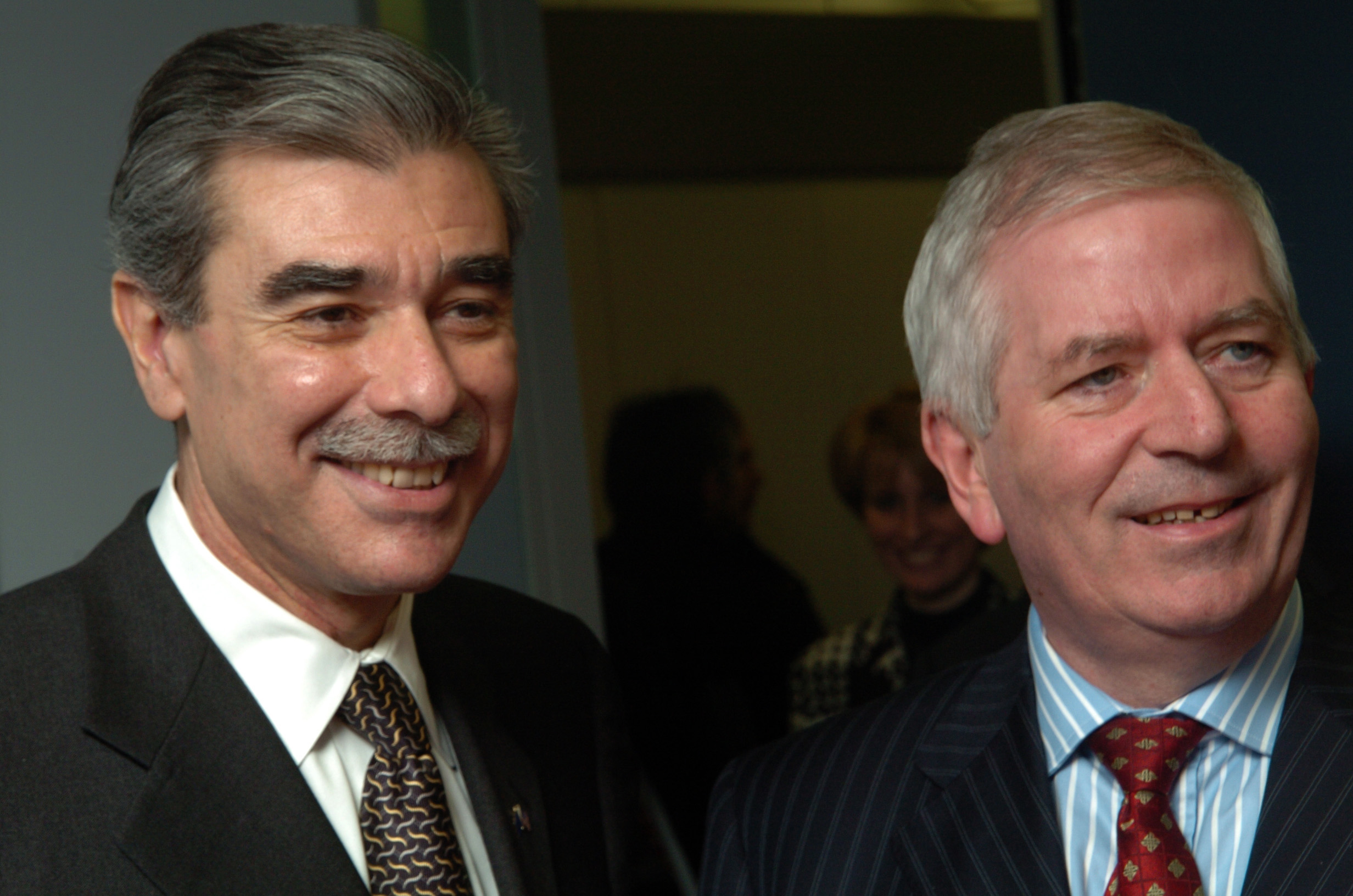
McCreevy with US Secretary of Commerce Carlos Gutierrez in February 2005

In 2004, McCreevy was selected by the Government of Ireland to replace David Byrne as Ireland's European Commissioner. He was appointed to the Internal Market and Services portfolio, by President of the European Commission José Manuel Barroso. At his confirmation hearings in the European Parliament MEPs described him as "fluent and relaxed". He also informed them that he had campaigned for the ratification of every European Treaty since 1972.

"You will find me ready to meet, discuss, listen and argue on how best to deliver to our citizens the real benefits of an Internal Market. There are enormous challenges facing the EU in the coming period on which we all must find common ground. I want our policies to show that EU means something real and positive to the people in Europe."

When McCreevy resigned his Dáil seat on his appointment to the European Commission, his son, Charlie Jnr, declined the opportunity to be the Fianna Fáil candidate in the resulting by-election. The seat was won by the independent candidate, Catherine Murphy.

McCreevy sided with the major record labels who are trying to extend a fifty-year copyright exemption to ninety five years. In 2008, McCreevy was a supporter of attempts to introduce software patents in the European Union.

Following his departure from the commission, McCreevy was forced to resign from the board of a new banking firm, NBNK Investments, after an EU ethics committee found a conflict of interest with his work as a European Commissioner in charge of financial regulation. This is first time that a former member of the EU executive had to resign a directorship the 2003 system for overseeing the work of retired commissioners.

== Northern Rock Crisis ==
In October 2007, McCreevy, commenting on the Northern Rock Bank's loss of investor confidence, claimed that banking regulations in the UK which forces banks to be open to scrutiny from outside investors, caused the panic. He said if access to the banks dealings "had been restricted", then the trouble could have been avoided.

== Lisbon Treaty ratification 2008 ==
Irish constitutional law requires a referendum to alter the constitution for such a major change as the adoption of the Lisbon Treaty. Interviewed beforehand, McCreevy said that he had not read the Treaty in full himself, though he understood and endorsed it:

"I don't think there's anybody in this room who has read it cover to cover. I don't expect ordinary decent Irish people will be sitting down spending hours reading sections about sub-sections referring to other articles and sub-articles, but there is sufficient analysis done and people have put together a consolidated text which is quite easy to read ...Anyone who thinks that, as the reality and inevitability of EU enlargement has taken hold, that we can continue to tackle urgent problems without streamlining of the decision-making process is failing to face up to reality."

In the event, the referendum was held on 12 June and the Irish electorate did not approve the Treaty. McCreevy was heavily criticised in the European Parliament, by the leader of the Socialist group in the European Parliament, Martin Schulz, who demanded on 17 June 2008, that McCreevy be removed as a European Commissioner. Schulz slightly misquoted McCreevy, whom he stated had contributed to Ireland's rejection of the Lisbon Treaty with remarks during the referendum campaign that no "sane person" would read the document.

"This man goes to Ireland and says he has not read the treaty and tells people there is no need to read it," Schulz said during a heated debate on the referendum at the European Parliament in Strasbourg today."

== Other interests ==
McCreevy is a member of the Bilderberg Group.

McCreevy joined the board of Sports Direct International plc on 31 March 2011 and is also a director of Ryanair. He receives annual pension payments of €119,177.

== See also ==
- International Financial Services Centre
- Corporation tax in the Republic of Ireland

Political offices
Preceded by Brendan Daly	Minister for Social Welfare; 1992–1993	Succeeded by Michael Woods
Preceded by Máire Geoghegan-Quinn	Minister for Tourism, Transport and Communications; 1993	Succeeded by Brian Cowen as Minister for Transport, Energy and Communications
Preceded by Brian Cowen as Minister for Energy	Minister for Tourism and Trade; 1993–1994	Succeeded by Enda Kenny
Preceded by Ruairi Quinn	Minister for Finance; 1997–2004	Succeeded by Brian Cowen
Preceded by David Byrne	Irish European Commissioner; 2004–2010	Succeeded by Máire Geoghegan-Quinn
Preceded by Frits Bolkestein	European Commissioner for Internal Market and Services; 2004–2010	Succeeded by Michel Barnier

Dáil	Election	Deputy (Party)	Deputy (Party)	Deputy (Party)
4th	1923	Hugh Colohan (Lab)	John Conlan (FP)	George Wolfe (CnaG)
5th	1927 (Jun)	Hugh Colohan (Lab)	Domhnall Ua Buachalla (FF)	George Wolfe (CnaG)
6th	1927 (Sep)	Hugh Colohan (Lab)	Domhnall Ua Buachalla (FF)	George Wolfe (CnaG)
6th	1931 by-election	Thomas Harris (FF)	Domhnall Ua Buachalla (FF)	George Wolfe (CnaG)
7th	1932	Thomas Harris (FF)	William Norton (Lab)	Sydney Minch (CnaG)
8th	1933	Thomas Harris (FF)	William Norton (Lab)	Sydney Minch (CnaG)
9th	1937	Constituency abolished. See Carlow–Kildare		

Dáil	Election	Deputy (Party)	Deputy (Party)	Deputy (Party)	Deputy (Party)	Deputy (Party)
13th	1948	William Norton (Lab)	Thomas Harris (FF)	Gerard Sweetman (FG)	3 seats until 1961	3 seats until 1961
14th	1951	William Norton (Lab)	Thomas Harris (FF)	Gerard Sweetman (FG)	3 seats until 1961	3 seats until 1961
15th	1954	William Norton (Lab)	Thomas Harris (FF)	Gerard Sweetman (FG)	3 seats until 1961	3 seats until 1961
16th	1957	William Norton (Lab)	Patrick Dooley (FF)	Gerard Sweetman (FG)	3 seats until 1961	3 seats until 1961
17th	1961	William Norton (Lab)	Patrick Dooley (FF)	Gerard Sweetman (FG)	Brendan Crinion (FF)	4 seats 1961–1969
17th	1964 by-election	Terence Boylan (FF)	Patrick Dooley (FF)	Gerard Sweetman (FG)	Brendan Crinion (FF)	4 seats 1961–1969
18th	1965	Terence Boylan (FF)	Patrick Norton (Lab)	Gerard Sweetman (FG)	Brendan Crinion (FF)	4 seats 1961–1969
19th	1969	Terence Boylan (FF)	Paddy Power (FF)	Gerard Sweetman (FG)	3 seats 1969–1981	3 seats 1969–1981
19th	1970 by-election	Terence Boylan (FF)	Paddy Power (FF)	Patrick Malone (FG)	3 seats 1969–1981	3 seats 1969–1981
20th	1973	Joseph Bermingham (Lab)	Paddy Power (FF)	Patrick Malone (FG)	3 seats 1969–1981	3 seats 1969–1981
21st	1977	Joseph Bermingham (Lab)	Paddy Power (FF)	Charlie McCreevy (FF)	3 seats 1969–1981	3 seats 1969–1981
22nd	1981	Joseph Bermingham (Lab)	Paddy Power (FF)	Charlie McCreevy (FF)	Bernard Durkan (FG)	Alan Dukes (FG)
23rd	1982 (Feb)	Joseph Bermingham (Lab)	Paddy Power (FF)	Charlie McCreevy (FF)	Gerry Brady (FF)	Alan Dukes (FG)
24th	1982 (Nov)	Joseph Bermingham (Lab)	Paddy Power (FF)	Charlie McCreevy (FF)	Bernard Durkan (FG)	Alan Dukes (FG)
25th	1987	Emmet Stagg (Lab)	Paddy Power (FF)	Charlie McCreevy (FF)	Bernard Durkan (FG)	Alan Dukes (FG)
26th	1989	Emmet Stagg (Lab)	Seán Power (FF)	Charlie McCreevy (FF)	Bernard Durkan (FG)	Alan Dukes (FG)
27th	1992	Emmet Stagg (Lab)	Seán Power (FF)	Charlie McCreevy (FF)	Bernard Durkan (FG)	Alan Dukes (FG)
28th	1997	Constituency abolished. See Kildare North and Kildare South				

Dáil	Election	Deputy (Party)	Deputy (Party)	Deputy (Party)	Deputy (Party)	Deputy (Party)
28th	1997	Emmet Stagg (Lab)	Charlie McCreevy (FF)	Bernard Durkan (FG)	3 seats until 2007	
29th	2002	Emmet Stagg (Lab)	Charlie McCreevy (FF)	Bernard Durkan (FG)	3 seats until 2007	
29th	2005 by-election	Emmet Stagg (Lab)	Catherine Murphy (Ind.)	Bernard Durkan (FG)	3 seats until 2007	
30th	2007	Emmet Stagg (Lab)	Áine Brady (FF)	Bernard Durkan (FG)	Michael Fitzpatrick (FF)	4 seats until 2024
31st	2011	Emmet Stagg (Lab)	Catherine Murphy (Ind.)	Bernard Durkan (FG)	Anthony Lawlor (FG)	4 seats until 2024
32nd	2016	Frank O'Rourke (FF)	Catherine Murphy (SD)	Bernard Durkan (FG)	James Lawless (FF)	4 seats until 2024
33rd	2020	Réada Cronin (SF)	Catherine Murphy (SD)	Bernard Durkan (FG)	James Lawless (FF)	4 seats until 2024
34th	2024	Réada Cronin (SF)	Aidan Farrelly (SD)	Joe Neville (FG)	James Lawless (FF)	Naoise Ó Cearúil (FF)
