= Dermot Gleeson =

Irish barrister

Dermot Gleeson SC

Attorney General of Ireland
- In office 15 December 1994 – 26 June 1997
- Taoiseach: John Bruton
- Preceded by: Eoghan Fitzsimons
- Succeeded by: David Byrne

Personal details
- Born: 22 April 1948 (age 78) Cork, Ireland
- Party: Fine Gael
- Spouse: Darine McCluskey (m. 1978)
- Children: 4
- Education: University College Dublin; King's Inns

Dermot Gleeson SC (born 22 April 1948) is an Irish barrister who served as Attorney General of Ireland from 1994 to 1997.

Educated in Blackrock College, Dublin and University College Dublin. Gleeson holds B.A. and LL.M degrees and qualified as a barrister at the King's Inns, Dublin. His father John Gleeson SC was a barrister, the first Chairman of the Workplace Relations Commission and was later appointed a Circuit Court Judge, and two of his brothers are also barristers. Gleeson was called to the Irish bar in 1970 and first practised law on the Cork Circuit, away from Dublin, Ireland's main legal centre. In the early 1970s Gleeson was a part-time lecturer in Constitutional Law at University College Cork.

Gleeson moved to Dublin when he was appointed a Senior Counsel in 1979, at age 30. He is believed to be the youngest 'silk' appointed in the common law world in the last century, beating noted counsel such as the Australian QC Tony Morriss, who was made a silk at 32.

Gleeson was a leading barrister in Ireland in the 1980s and 1990s before he became a senior government advisor and then a businessman. From 1994 to 1997, Gleeson was Attorney General of Ireland, serving as chief legal advisor to the government of Taoiseach John Bruton. Gleeson is a Bencher of King's Inns. He is also a visiting fellow at the School of Law at University College Dublin.

In more recent years Gleeson became known for his business career. In 2000, he joined the board of Independent News and Media Plc as a non-executive director and in 2003, he was appointed Chairman of Ireland's largest bank Allied Irish Banks. His time in charge of AIB Group coincided with the 2008 financial crisis, which resulted in the enormous drops in its share price, leading to the infamous 'egging' incident at AIB Group's May 2009 shareholder's meeting. In 2003, Gleeson was appointed ombudsman for the Diamond Trading Company (DTC), the marketing offshoot of diamond mining giant De Beers. In 2007, he was appointed chairman of the Governing Body of University College, Cork.

Gleeson is a former Auditor of the Literary and Historical Society, University College Dublin, and winner of the Irish Times National Debating Championship.

He currently resides in Dublin. He is married and has four children.

== See also ==
- Auditors of the Literary and Historical Society (University College Dublin)

Legal offices
Preceded by Eoghan Fitzsimons	Attorney General of Ireland; 1994–1997	Succeeded by David Byrne
