= Catherine Murphy (politician) =

Irish former politician (born 1953)

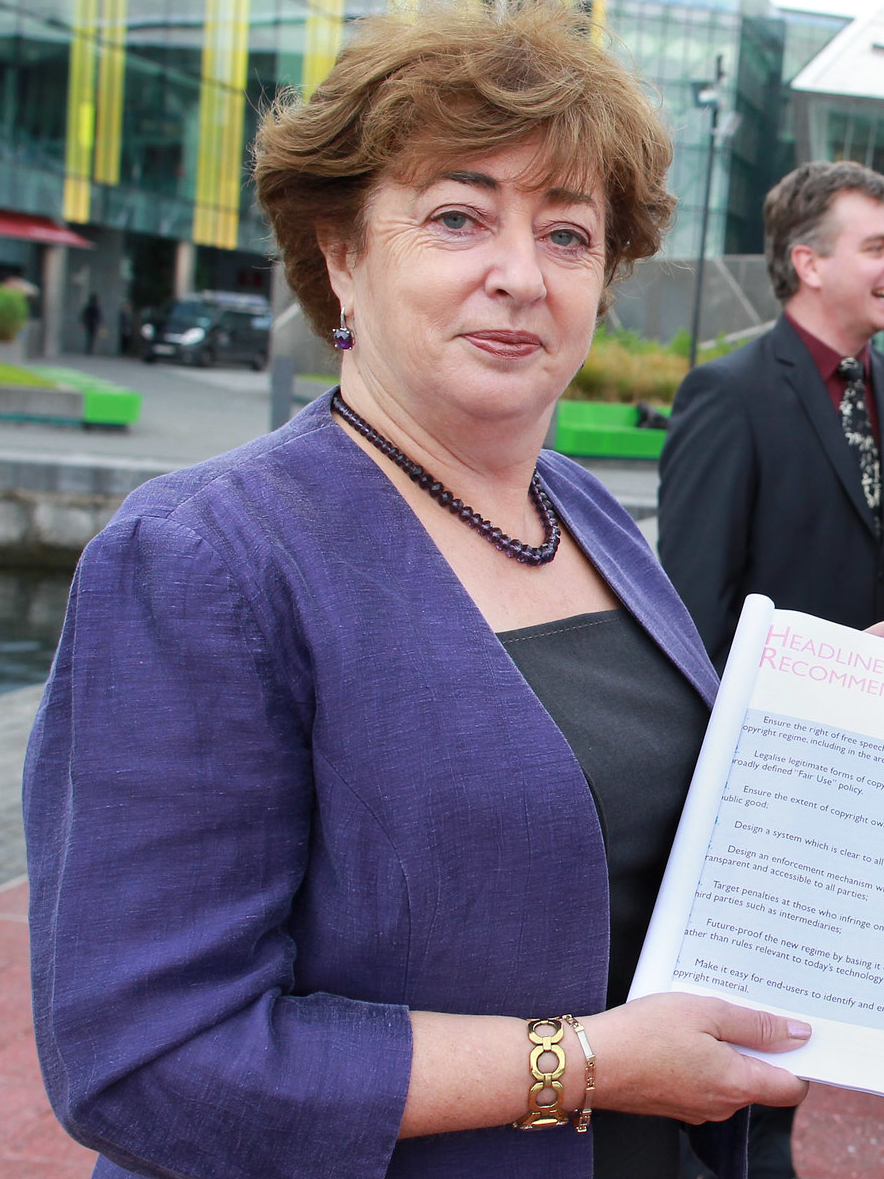
- Murphy in 2012

Leader of the Social Democrats
- In office 15 July 2015 – 1 March 2023 Serving with Róisín Shortall
- Preceded by: New office
- Succeeded by: Holly Cairns

Teachta Dála
- In office February 2011 – November 2024
- In office March 2005 – May 2007
- Constituency: Kildare North

Personal details
- Born: 1 September 1953 (age 72) Palmerstown, Dublin, Ireland
- Party: Social Democrats
- Other political affiliations: Workers' Party (1983–1992); Democratic Left (1992–1999); Labour Party (1999–2003); Independent (2003–2015)
- Spouse: Derek Murphy (m. 1977)
- Children: 2
- Education: Dublin City University
- Website: catherinemurphy.ie

Catherine Murphy (born 1 September 1953) is an Irish former Social Democrats politician who served as a Teachta Dála (TD) for the Kildare North constituency from 2011 to 2024, and previously from 2005 to 2007. She served as founding joint leader of the Social Democrats from 2015 to 2023.

== Early and personal life ==
Murphy was raised in Palmerstown, County Dublin, but moved to Leixlip, County Kildare in 1978. She has two children with husband Derek Murphy.

== Political career ==
Elections to the Dáil
Party	Election		FPv	FPv%	Result
Workers' Party	Kildare	1989	1,520	3.0	Eliminated on count 5/9
Democratic Left	Kildare	1992	1,613	3.2	Eliminated on count 8/12
Democratic Left	Kildare North	1997	2,762	8.8	Eliminated on count 4/5
Independent	Kildare North	2005 by-election	5,985	23.6	Elected on count 5/5
Independent	Kildare North	2007	5,188	11.5	Eliminated on count 6/6
Independent	Kildare North	2011	6,911	13.5	Elected on count 5/5
Social Democrats	Kildare North	2016	11,108	22.7	Elected on count 1/9
Social Democrats	Kildare North	2020	9,808	19.3	Elected on count 3/6

=== Workers' Party and Democratic Left ===
Originally becoming involved in politics through campaigns against high local service charges in Leixlip, she joined the Workers' Party in 1983. She first held political office in 1988, when she was elected to Leixlip Town Commission. She stood unsuccessfully as a Workers' Party candidate for the Leinster constituency at the 1989 European Parliament election and for the Kildare constituency at the 1989 general election.

She was elected at 1991 Kildare County Council election for the Celbridge local electoral area. When the Workers' Party split in 1992, she followed Proinsias De Rossa into the new Democratic Left, and stood unsuccessfully as a Democratic Left candidate in Kildare at the 1992 and 1997 general elections.

She opposed Democratic Left's merger with the Labour Party in 1998, criticising the party as "highly opportunistic". She also stated that she would refuse to join a merged entity. However, in the 1999 local elections, she was re-elected to Kildare County Council, this time for the Leixlip local electoral area representing the Labour Party, she also won a seat on Leixlip Town Council.

=== Independent politician ===
She resigned from the Labour Party in June 2003, citing what she termed "destructive internal intrigues". She stood as an independent at the 2004 local elections and was re-elected to both council seats, topping the poll.

Charlie McCreevy, the Fianna Fáil TD for Kildare North, resigned from the Dáil in November 2004, when he was appointed as a European Commissioner. Murphy contested the resulting by-election in March 2005 as an independent candidate, and won the seat. On a low turnout, she polled slightly fewer first-preference votes than Fianna Fáil's Áine Brady, but was elected on the fifth count. Her by-election campaign had the backing of several other prominent independent TDs such as Tony Gregory and Marian Harkin. Murphy's campaign was based on such issues as transport, local government, affordable housing and education, and after her victory she promised to be a "thorn in the side" of the government.

At the 2007 general election, she lost her seat to her by-election opponent Áine Brady. Brady was elected on the first count; Murphy held on until the last, when Fine Gael's Bernard Durkan reached the quota by transfers from his eliminated running mate. In July 2008, she regained the council seat she had formerly held before her election as a TD (due to the dual mandate) when the councillor that replaced her, Gerry McDonagh, resigned his seat.

She was re-elected to the council at the 2009 local elections, topping the poll with over 2,000 more votes than the quota. She was also re-elected to Leixlip Town Council.

Murphy regained her Dáil seat following the 2011 general election. She sat in the Technical group where she was the chief whip.

On 20 September 2011, Murphy confirmed she had signed papers nominating Senator David Norris as a candidate at the 2011 presidential election, she said, "to ensure that [Senator David Norris] can be judged not by fellow politicians but by the people of Ireland."

She was critical of the household charge, describing it as a "fundamentally unfair" one.

==== Denis O'Brien controversy ====
On 27 May 2015, Murphy attempted to raise issue in the Dáil the issue of billionaire Denis O'Brien receiving an injunction barring the media from revealing details of his request that the liquidator of the Irish Bank Resolution Corporation continue favourable terms O'Brien had received from the bank. Ceann Comhairle Seán Barrett ruled her contributions "out of order". Murphy attempted to raise the matter again the following day, this time with more success.

Lawyers acting for O'Brien immediately forced the country's media to censor its coverage, which some media outlets confirmed. RTÉ reporter Philip Boucher-Hayes tweeted that Drivetime would play Murphy's speech; it was not broadcast and his tweet was deleted. Tonight with Vincent Browne (with Browne absent and instead moderated by Ger Colleran, editor of INM's Irish Daily Star) featured Colleran reading a statement from TV3 management asserting that no discussion about Murphy's comments would be allowed following letters from O'Brien's lawyers. Foreign commentators covering these events for the international media suggested Irish democracy had been "wiped away at a stroke".

=== Social Democrats ===
On 15 July 2015, Murphy launched the Social Democrats party along with former independent TD Stephen Donnelly and former Labour Party TD Róisín Shortall.

On 22 February 2023, Murphy and Shortall announced that they would step down as co-leaders of the Social Democrats. They were succeeded by Holly Cairns on 1 March. On 2 July 2024, she and Shortall both announced that they would not contest the next general election.

Dáil	Election	Deputy (Party)	Deputy (Party)	Deputy (Party)	Deputy (Party)	Deputy (Party)
28th	1997	Emmet Stagg (Lab)	Charlie McCreevy (FF)	Bernard Durkan (FG)	3 seats until 2007	
29th	2002	Emmet Stagg (Lab)	Charlie McCreevy (FF)	Bernard Durkan (FG)	3 seats until 2007	
29th	2005 by-election	Emmet Stagg (Lab)	Catherine Murphy (Ind.)	Bernard Durkan (FG)	3 seats until 2007	
30th	2007	Emmet Stagg (Lab)	Áine Brady (FF)	Bernard Durkan (FG)	Michael Fitzpatrick (FF)	4 seats until 2024
31st	2011	Emmet Stagg (Lab)	Catherine Murphy (Ind.)	Bernard Durkan (FG)	Anthony Lawlor (FG)	4 seats until 2024
32nd	2016	Frank O'Rourke (FF)	Catherine Murphy (SD)	Bernard Durkan (FG)	James Lawless (FF)	4 seats until 2024
33rd	2020	Réada Cronin (SF)	Catherine Murphy (SD)	Bernard Durkan (FG)	James Lawless (FF)	4 seats until 2024
34th	2024	Réada Cronin (SF)	Aidan Farrelly (SD)	Joe Neville (FG)	James Lawless (FF)	Naoise Ó Cearúil (FF)
