= Harry Whelehan =

Irish barrister and judge (born 1944)

President of the High Court
- In office 15 November 1994 – 17 November 1994
- Nominated by: Government of Ireland
- Appointed by: Mary Robinson
- Preceded by: Liam Hamilton
- Succeeded by: Declan Costello

Judge of the High Court
- In office 15 November 1994 – 17 November 1994
- Nominated by: Government of Ireland
- Appointed by: Mary Robinson

Attorney General of Ireland
- In office 26 September 1991 – 11 November 1994
- Taoiseach: Charles Haughey; Albert Reynolds
- Preceded by: John L. Murray
- Succeeded by: Eoghan Fitzsimons

Personal details
- Born: 12 June 1944 (age 82) Dublin, Ireland
- Party: Fianna Fáil
- Education: University College Dublin; King's Inns

Harry Whelehan (born 17 February 1944) is a retired Irish judge and barrister who served as President of the High Court and a Judge of the High Court from 15 November 1994 to 17 November 1994, and Attorney General of Ireland from 1991 to 1994.

== Attorney General ==
Taoiseach Charles Haughey appointed Whelehan Attorney General of Ireland in the Fianna Fáil–PD coalition on 26 September 1991, replacing John L. Murray, who had been nominated to the European Court of Justice. Whelehan was reappointed by Albert Reynolds after Haughey's resignation, and reappointed by the Fianna Fáil–Labour coalition after the 1992 general election.

=== X Case ===
In 1992, Whelehan was the attorney general in the X Case, in which he chose to seek an injunction to prevent a 14 year old child, "Miss X", a teenager pregnant from rape, from travelling abroad to the United Kingdom for an abortion, after she became pregnant after the violent attack. This was a test case of the (subsequently repealed) Eighth Amendment of the Constitution of Ireland, which guaranteed the "right to life of the unborn". In a 2010 documentary, government press secretary Seán Duignan said some ministers felt Whelehan should have turned a blind eye to the case. Whelehan expressed regret for "the upset, the sadness and the trauma which was visited on everybody involved", but felt he had a duty to uphold the Constitution, and that only he had locus standi for the fetus involved.

=== Beef tribunal ===
Whelehan intervened in the Beef Tribunal to prevent Minister Ray Burke from being questioned about cabinet discussions on the beef industry. His argument that cabinet confidentiality was paramount was controversially accepted by the Supreme Court. The Seventeenth Amendment of the Constitution of Ireland passed in 1997 loosened this restriction.

=== Brendan Smyth ===
In March 1993, the Royal Ulster Constabulary (RUC) requested the extradition of Brendan Smyth, a priest arrested for child sex abuse. Eight months later, in November 1993, the request was still at the Office of the Attorney General, when the RUC informed the Office that Smyth had voluntarily given himself up in Northern Ireland. In October 1994, a UTV documentary on Smyth suggested the delay in processing the request was deliberate. Whelehan stated he had not known of its existence. The delay was variously blamed on short staffing in the office and the complexity of the case, which might fall under a previously unused provision of the law on extradition. Reynolds later won a libel suit against The Times of London over an article on the affair. Whelehan prepared a memorandum on the Smyth case for the Taoiseach, which was delivered on 15 November 1994. This claimed the case was the first one to involve section 50 of the Extradition Act 1965 (inserted by section 2(1)(b) of the Extradition (Amendment) Act 1987).

== Judicial career ==
=== High Court appointment and resignation ===
Thomas Finlay retired as Chief Justice of Ireland in September 1994, and Liam Hamilton was promoted from President of the High Court to replace him. In early 1994, when the government was considering forthcoming judicial appointments, Whelehan expressed an interest in becoming President of the High Court and a Judge of the High Court. This was opposed by Tánaiste Dick Spring, leader of the Labour Party, Reynolds' coalition partner; negotiations on a quid pro quo were held in October 1994. On 11 November 1994, while the Brendan Smyth controversy was still in the news, Reynolds appointed Whelehan to the vacancy, at a cabinet meeting from which Labour ministers were absent. Mary Robinson, the President of Ireland, confirmed his appointment the same day, and he took his oath of office from the Chief Justice on 15 November. Over the next two days he heard one case and part of another.

In the Dáil on 15 November 1994, Reynolds summarised the report he had received from Whelehan. It was then alleged that an extradition case involving another paedophile cleric, John Anthony Duggan, had been resolved promptly in 1992 after considering section 50 of the Extradition Act. Whelehan argued that, although section 50 had been considered in the Duggan case, it had not been applied. Reynolds stated he regretted having appointed Whelehan, and The Irish Times reported that Whelehan's successor as Attorney General, Eoghan Fitzsimons, had tried to persuade Whelehan to resign his judgeship. Whelehan rebuffed Fitzsimons, but resigned on 17 November to "keep the judiciary out of politics". Reynolds ordered Fitzsimons to report on his predecessor's conduct of the Smyth case.

The political damage caused the Labour Party to leave the coalition, though without forcing an election; instead it formed another coalition with Fine Gael and Democratic Left. Controversy over Reynolds' unilateral appointment of Whelehan led to the establishment of an independent Judicial Appointments Advisory Board to make recommendations for the government.

== Later career ==
The rules of the Bar Council of Ireland normally prohibit former judges from working in a court of a level the same as or lower than the court on which they sat. In Whelehan's case, this would have meant he could not work in any court, as the President of the High Court is ex officio a member of the Supreme Court. The Bar Council voted in favour of making an exception to the rule for his case.

Whelehan continued to have a successful career at the bar following his return to private practice. The Irish Independent in 2007 reported that repeated recommendations of Whelehan for a judgeship by the Judicial Appointments Advisory Board had been rejected by Fianna Fáil-led governments, because of his role in bringing down the government in 1994.

== Sources ==
- Daniel, Ann (12 November 2012). "Ch.5: A Scandal of Church and State". Scapegoats for a Profession. Routledge. pp. 97–122. ISBN 9781136650680.
- Oireachtas Sub Committee on Legislation and Security (1995). Inquiry into the Events of 11 to 15 November 1994. Government publications. Vol. Pn.1478. Dublin: Stationery Office. ISBN 0-7076-1583-6. Archived from the original on 17 December 2014.
- Whelehan, Harry (16 November 1994). Memorandum to the Taoiseach from the Attorney General : re: John Gerald Brendan Smyth (PDF). Official publications. Vol. Pn.1177.

Legal offices
Preceded by John L. Murray	Attorney General of Ireland; 1991–1994	Succeeded by Eoghan Fitzsimons
Preceded by Liam Hamilton	President of the High Court; 15–17 November 1994	Succeeded by Declan Costello
