= David Byrne (barrister) =

Irish lawyer and politician (born 1947)

David Byrne SC
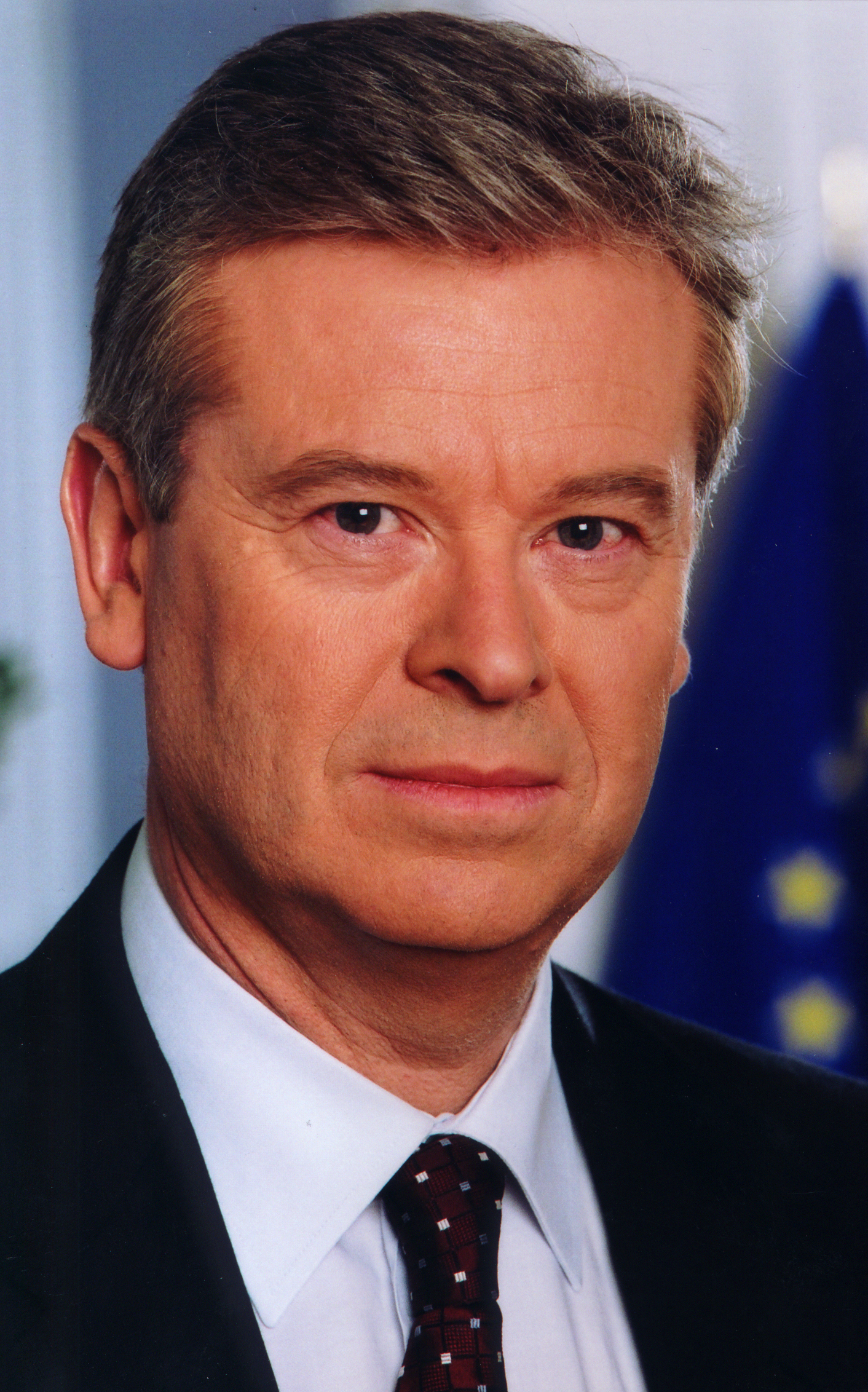
- Official portrait, 2001

Chancellor of Dublin City University
- In office 4 June 2006 – 21 August 2011
- President: Brian MacCraith
- Preceded by: Brian Hillery
- Succeeded by: Martin McAleese

European Commissioner for Health and Consumer Protection
- In office 16 September 1999 – 30 October 2004
- President: Romano Prodi
- Preceded by: Emma Bonino
- Succeeded by: Pavel Telička

Attorney General of Ireland
- In office 26 June 1997 – 17 July 1999
- Taoiseach: Bertie Ahern
- Preceded by: Dermot Gleeson
- Succeeded by: Michael McDowell

Personal details
- Born: David Byrne; 6 April 1947 (age 79) Monasterevin, County Kildare, Ireland
- Party: Fianna Fáil
- Education: University College Dublin; King's Inns

David Byrne SC (born 6 April 1947) is an Irish Fianna Fáil politician and barrister who served as Chancellor of Dublin City University from 2006 to 2011, European Commissioner for Health and Consumer Protection from 1999 to 2004 and the Attorney General of Ireland from 1997 to 1999.

== Early life and career ==
Byrne was born in Monasterevin, County Kildare, in 1947. He was educated at Newbridge College, County Kildare, University College Dublin, and King's Inns, Dublin. He was called to the Bar in 1970, and practiced law in the Irish and European Courts. During his student days in Dublin, he founded the Free Legal Advice Centre, a student-run organisation providing legal aid to citizens in association with the legal profession. He campaigned in favour of Irish entry into the European Community in the 1970s, and has been a keen supporter of European integration ever since.

Byrne became a Senior Counsel in 1985. He practised in both the Irish courts and the European Court of Justice, and also served as a member of the International Court of Commercial Arbitration from 1990 to 1997.

In 1997, Byrne became Attorney General of Ireland in the Fianna Fáil-Progressive Democrats coalition government. As one of the negotiators of the Good Friday Agreement in April 1998, he drafted and oversaw the major constitutional amendments required by that agreement, which were approved by Referendum in May 1998. Byrne also advised on the constitutional amendments necessary for Ireland's ratification of the Amsterdam Treaty. During his tenure, he established the first independent Food Safety Agency in Europe responsible to the Minister of Health.

=== European Commissioner for Health and Consumer Protection ===
Byrne was nominated to the European Commission by Taoiseach Bertie Ahern in September 1999, serving as Ireland's EU Commissioner, and had responsibility for Health and Consumer Protection in the Prodi Commission. He continued in that role until replaced as Ireland's Commissioner by Charlie McCreevy in 2004.

During his time in office, Byrne was a major driving force behind European tobacco control legislation, such as directives banning tobacco advertising and regulating tobacco products, in keeping with the WHO Framework Convention on Tobacco Control. Under his leadership, the European Union also created the European Centre for Disease Prevention and Control in 2004.

== World Health Organization ==
When he concluded his Brussels assignment, Byrne acted as WHO Special Envoy on the revision of the International Health Regulations for a six-month period following a series of outbreaks of SARS and avian influenza.

Byrne was mooted as a potential candidate for the position of Director General of the World Health Organization following the death of the incumbent, Lee Jong-wook in 2006. However, he was eventually not included in the list of 13 candidates to head the agency.

== Life after politics ==
After leaving the European Commission, Byrne has held a variety of paid and unpaid positions, including the following:

- European Alliance for Personalised Medicine, Co-Chair
- FleishmanHillard, Member of the International Advisory Board
- Health First Europe (HFE), Patron
- International Prevention Research Institute (iPRI), Chairman of the Ethics Committee
- National Treasury Management Agency (NTMA), Chairman of the Advisory Committee
- Wilmer Cutler Pickering Hale and Dorr, Of counsel
- World Justice Project, Honorary Co-Chair
- World Prevention Alliance, Honorary Chair Member

Political offices
Preceded by Pádraig Flynn	Irish European Commissioner; 1999–2004	Succeeded by Charlie McCreevy
Legal offices
Preceded by Dermot Gleeson	Attorney General of Ireland; 1997–1999	Succeeded by Michael McDowell
