= Albert Reynolds =

Taoiseach from 1992 to 1994

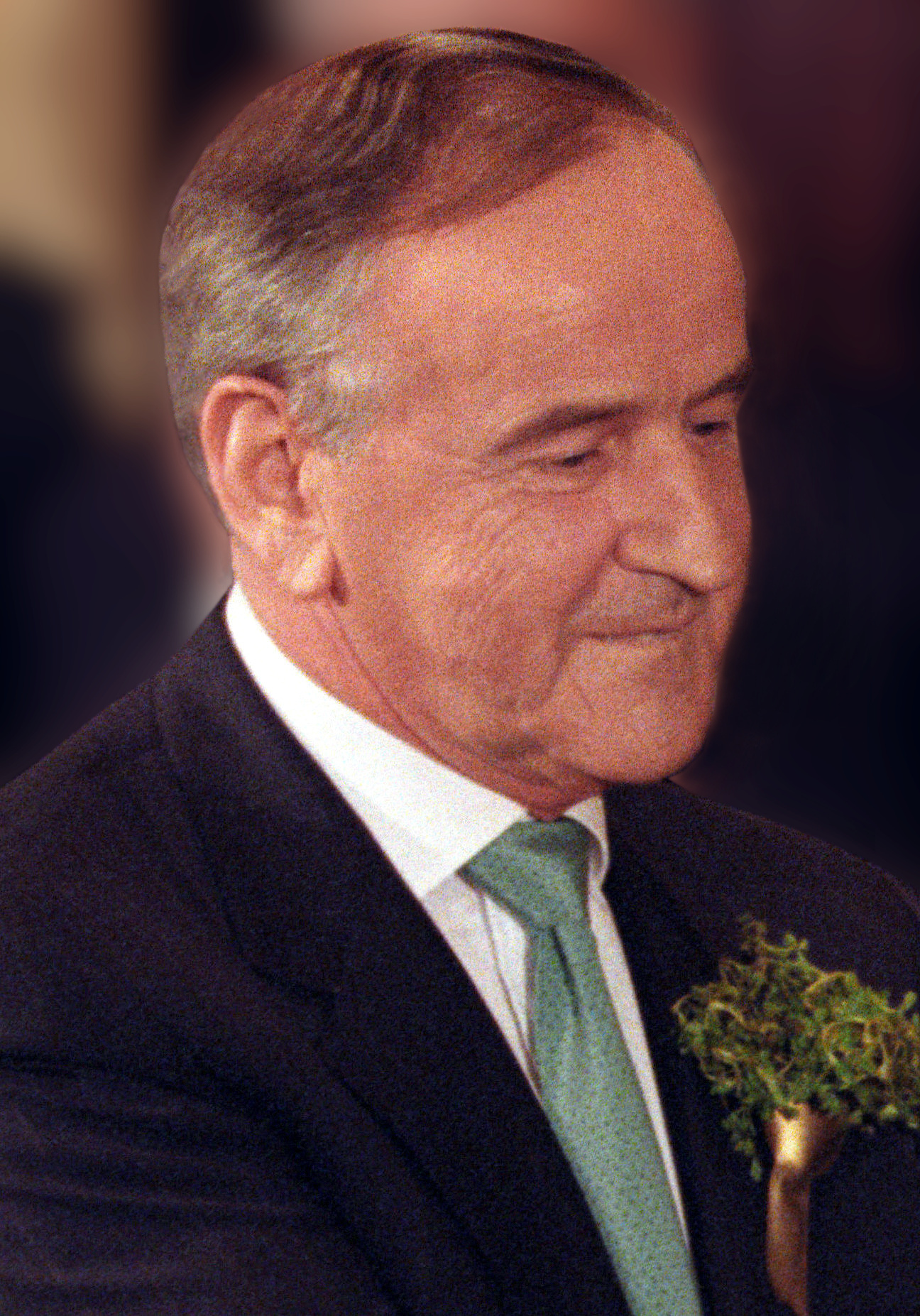
- Reynolds in 1994

Taoiseach
- In office 11 February 1992 – 15 December 1994
- President: Mary Robinson
- Tánaiste: John Wilson; Dick Spring; Bertie Ahern
- Preceded by: Charles Haughey
- Succeeded by: John Bruton

Leader of Fianna Fáil
- In office 6 February 1992 – 19 November 1994
- Deputy: Bertie Ahern
- Preceded by: Charles Haughey
- Succeeded by: Bertie Ahern
Ministerial offices 1979‍–‍1991
Minister for Finance
In office 24 November 1988 – 7 November 1991
Taoiseach	Charles Haughey
Preceded by	Ray MacSharry
Succeeded by	Bertie Ahern
Minister for Industry and Commerce
In office 10 March 1987 – 24 November 1988
Taoiseach	Charles Haughey
Preceded by	Michael Noonan
Succeeded by	Ray Burke
Minister for Industry and Energy
In office 9 March 1982 – 14 December 1982
Taoiseach	Charles Haughey
Preceded by	Michael O'Leary
Succeeded by	John Bruton
Minister for Transport
In office 25 January 1980 – 30 June 1981
Taoiseach	Charles Haughey
Preceded by	George Colley
Succeeded by	Patrick Cooney
Minister for Posts and Telegraphs
In office 12 December 1979 – 30 June 1981
Taoiseach	Charles Haughey
Preceded by	Pádraig Faulkner
Succeeded by	Patrick Cooney

Teachta Dála
- In office November 1992 – May 2002
- Constituency: Longford–Roscommon
- In office June 1977 – November 1992
- Constituency: Longford–Westmeath

Personal details
- Born: Albert Martin Reynolds; 3 November 1932 Roosky, County Roscommon, Ireland
- Died: 21 August 2014 (aged 81) Donnybrook, Dublin, Ireland
- Resting place: Shanganagh Cemetery, Shankill, Dublin
- Party: Fianna Fáil
- Spouse: Kathleen Coen (m. 1960)
- Children: 7, including Leonie
- Education: Summerhill College

Albert Martin Reynolds (3 November 1932 – 21 August 2014) was an Irish Fianna Fáil politician who served as Taoiseach and Leader of Fianna Fáil from 1992 to 1994. Between 1979 and 1991, he held several cabinet positions, including Minister for Finance from 1988 to 1991. He served as a Teachta Dála (TD) for Longford–Roscommon from 1977 to 1992, and for Longford–Westmeath from 1992 to 2002.

During his first term as taoiseach, Reynolds led a coalition government of Fianna Fáil and the Progressive Democrats. In his second term, he headed a coalition of Fianna Fáil and the Labour Party.

== Early life, education and personal life ==
Albert Martin Reynolds was born on 3 November 1932 in Kilglas, near Roosky, on the County Roscommon–Leitrim border. His father was a carpenter and coachbuilder. Because of his rural background, his political opponents often referred to him as a "country bumpkin".

During the 1950s, he attended Summerhill College in Sligo and worked as a clerk for CIÉ, the state transport service. Despite the late‑night nature of his business, Reynolds abstained from alcohol. Reynolds married Kathleen Coen (1932–2021) in 1962, and they had seven children.

== Business career ==
Reynolds became involved in the showband scene, owning several dance halls, including Cloudland Ballroom in Roosky (opened in 1957); Roseland Ballroom in Moate (opened in 1959); Dreamland Ballroom in Athy (opened in 1961); Fairyland Ballroom in Roscommon (opened in 1961); Danceland Ballroom in Portlaoise (opened in 1962); Lakeland Ballroom in Mullingar (opened in 1963); Jetland Ballroom in Limerick (opened in 1963); Rockland Ballroom in Borris-in-Ossory; Borderlands Ballroom in Clones; Tippland Ballroom in Cashel; and Barrowland Ballroom in New Ross (opened in 1967).

He became wealthy during the 1960s as dance halls grew extremely popular. He invested in various enterprises, including a pet‑food company, a bacon factory, a fish‑exporting operation, and a hire purchase company. Reynolds also had business interests in local newspapers and a cinema. He established business contacts at both national and international levels.

== Political life ==
Reynolds became interested in politics during the Arms Crisis, a controversial episode in which two government ministers, Minister for Agriculture and Fisheries Neil Blaney and Minister for Finance Charles Haughey, were removed from the government over an attempt to send arms to Northern Ireland in 1970; Blaney and Haughey were later acquitted in court.

In the wake of this case, Reynolds launched a political career from his background as a successful businessman in western Ireland. He stood for Fianna Fáil in the 1977 general election for the Longford–Westmeath constituency. The election proved to be a landslide victory for Fianna Fáil, with the party winning a 20‑seat parliamentary majority, resulting in Jack Lynch returning as Taoiseach. Reynolds remained a backbencher until 1979. That year, pressure mounted on Lynch, the incumbent Taoiseach and Fianna Fáil leader, to step down. Reynolds became a member of the so‑called "gang of five" politicians with strong rural backgrounds—Jackie Fahey (Tipperary), Mark Killilea Jnr (Galway), Tom McEllistrim (Kerry), and Seán Doherty (Roscommon)—which aligned itself with Charles Haughey and supported him in the subsequent leadership contest.

=== Fianna Fáil minister ===
Reynolds was rewarded for his staunch loyalty with appointment to the newly elected Taoiseach Charles Haughey's cabinet as Minister for Posts and Telegraphs. He was later appointed Minister for Transport, making his brief one of the largest and most wide‑ranging in the government. As Minister for Transport, Reynolds was involved in an incident in which Aer Lingus Flight 164 was hijacked by a disturbed former monk, whose chief demand for the safe return of the aircraft and its passengers was to be allowed to reveal a religious secret, the Third Secret of Fatima, which he claimed to have in his briefcase. The incident was resolved in Paris with no injuries.

Fianna Fáil lost power following the 1981 general election but regained it following the February 1982 general election. Reynolds returned to government as Minister for Industry and Energy. He was responsible for developing the Dublin–Cork gas pipeline. That government fell in late 1982, and Reynolds returned to the opposition benches. During 1982–83, Fianna Fáil leader Charles Haughey faced three no‑confidence motions; Reynolds supported him each time, and Haughey stayed in power.

In 1987, Fianna Fáil returned to government, and Reynolds was appointed minister for industry and commerce, one of the most senior cabinet positions. In 1988, the minister for Finance, Ray MacSharry, became Ireland's European Commissioner, and Reynolds succeeded him as minister for finance.

== Coalition (1989–1992) ==
The 1989 general election resulted in Fianna Fáil taking the unprecedented step of entering coalition with the recently formed, free‑market‑oriented Progressive Democrats (PDs), marking a consolidation of coalition politics in the state. A programme for government was agreed in July 1989, and Reynolds returned as Minister for Finance in the Fianna Fáil–PD coalition.

The failure of Fianna Fáil candidate Brian Lenihan to win the 1990 presidential election added to pressure on Charles Haughey's leadership. In 1991, Reynolds publicly indicated he would contest the leadership if a vacancy arose, as discontent grew among TDs and senators; a largely rural group of supporters boosted his profile within the party. In November 1991, a motion of no confidence in Haughey was tabled by Seán Power; Reynolds and Pádraig Flynn backed the motion and were dismissed from cabinet, and Haughey subsequently survived the vote by 55–22.

Haughey's position eroded further amid controversies over ministerial appointments and renewed revelations linked to the 1980s phone‑tapping affair; the PDs indicated they could not continue in government with him as Taoiseach, precipitating his decision to step down in early 1992.

== Taoiseach (1992–1994) ==
=== 22nd government of Ireland (1992–1993) ===
On 30 January 1992, Charles Haughey resigned as Leader of Fianna Fáil at a parliamentary party meeting. Reynolds alongside Mary O'Rourke and Michael Woods ran in the Fianna Fáil leadership election on 6 February 1992 where he won and was elected Taoiseach five days later on 11 February.

Reynolds overhauled the cabinet on taking office, excluding several long‑serving Haughey loyalists and promoting figures who had been critical of Haughey, while retaining Bertie Ahern as Minister for Finance.

==== X Case ====
On Reynolds's first day as Taoiseach, the government confronted the "X Case," concerning whether a 14‑year‑old pregnant through rape could obtain an abortion; the Attorney General, Harry Whelehan, sought an injunction to restrain travel, the High Court granted it, and the Supreme Court then held abortion lawful where there was a real and substantial risk to the woman's life, including risk of suicide; three related constitutional amendments (travel, information, and excluding suicide as a ground) were put to referendum alongside the 1992 general election, with travel and information passing and the suicide‑exclusion defeated.

==== European Union ====
Reynolds negotiated additional supports for Ireland within the EU's regional aid framework during the Maastricht ratification period after Denmark's initial rejection, as subsequent arrangements clarified opt‑outs and facilitated overall treaty implementation.

==== Beef Tribunal and 1992 election ====
Amid revelations at the Beef Tribunal that heightened tensions with coalition partners, including disputes between Reynolds and Desmond O'Malley over export credit policy, the Progressive Democrats withdrew support, triggering a dissolution and the 1992 general election. Fianna Fáil's vote fell and the party lost nine seats; Labour surged to a historic high of 33 seats, and in January 1993 Fianna Fáil formed a new government with Labour, with Reynolds as Taoiseach and Dick Spring as Tánaiste.

=== 23rd government of Ireland (1993–1994) ===
==== Tensions with Labour ====
In 1993, Minister for Finance Bertie Ahern introduced a tax amnesty that provoked controversy and sharpened policy divisions within the coalition; Fianna Fáil then suffered defeats in the Mayo West and Dublin South‑Central by‑elections on 9 June 1994, further weakening the government’s position.

The Beef Tribunal (chaired by Liam Hamilton) concluded in July 1994, detailing malpractice in the industry, including tax issues at Goodman International; Labour insisted it would leave the government if the report criticised Reynolds, and coalition trust deteriorated amid disagreements over the handling and presentation of the report.

==== Northern Ireland and foreign affairs ====
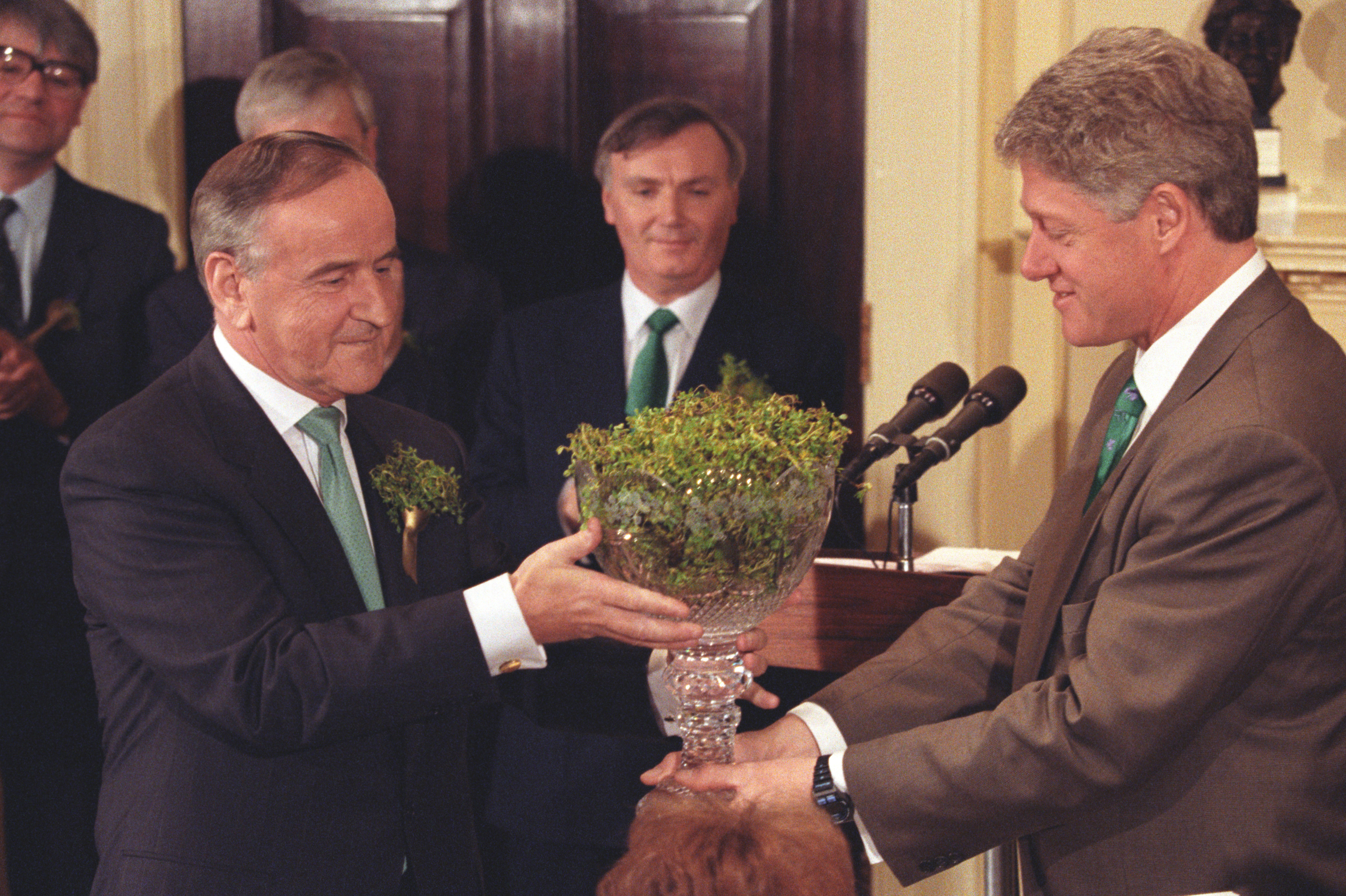
Reynolds (left) presenting shamrock to U.S. president Bill Clinton on Saint Patrick's Day, 1994

Reynolds's principal achievement as Taoiseach was advancing the Northern Ireland peace process. Negotiations with UK prime minister John Major produced the Downing Street Declaration (15 December 1993), which framed principles for inclusive politics and non‑violence; Reynolds and John Hume subsequently helped secure the IRA ceasefire on 31 August 1994.

In September 1994, Reynolds was left waiting at Shannon Airport when Russian president Boris Yeltsin failed to disembark; reports variously attributed the episode to illness, a cardiac event, or oversleeping, and Yeltsin later said he had overslept.

==== Whelehan controversy and downfall ====
In late 1994, the appointment of Attorney General Harry Whelehan as President of the High Court amid controversy over prior handling of extradition in the Brendan Smyth case precipitated a coalition rupture; Labour withdrew from government on 16 November, and Reynolds resigned as Taoiseach on 17 November 1994, remaining in a caretaker capacity until John Bruton took office on 15 December 1994.

==== Succession ====
On 19 November 1994, Reynolds resigned as Fianna Fáil leader; Bertie Ahern was unanimously elected as his successor, though Máire Geoghegan-Quinn withdrew before the vote, and an anticipated renewal of the Fianna Fáil–Labour coalition under Ahern collapsed during negotiations, leading Labour to form a Rainbow Coalition with Fine Gael and Democratic Left.

Elections to the Dáil
Party	Election		FPv	FPv%	Result
Fianna Fáil	Longford–Westmeath	1977	7,064	15.4	Elected on count 6/7
Fianna Fáil	Longford–Westmeath	1981	10,450	23.0	Elected on count 1/8
Fianna Fáil	Longford–Westmeath	Feb 1982	10,214	23.7	Elected on count 1/6
Fianna Fáil	Longford–Westmeath	Nov 1982	8,999	20.5	Elected on count 1/6
Fianna Fáil	Longford–Westmeath	1987	10,542	23.4	Elected on count 1/7
Fianna Fáil	Longford–Westmeath	1989	9,055	21.4	Elected on count 1/6
Fianna Fáil	Longford–Roscommon	1992	10,307	22.8	Elected on count 1/9
Fianna Fáil	Longford–Roscommon	1997	8,742	18.5	Elected on count 3/8

== Post-Taoiseach period ==
On 4 February 1995, Reynolds was interviewed at length by broadcaster Andrew Neil on Channel 4's one‑to‑one current‑affairs format produced by Open Media, reflecting continued media interest in his role after office.

At the beginning of 1997, reports indicated that Bertie Ahern had encouraged Reynolds to consider roles linked to the peace process and to weigh a presidential run; Fianna Fáil won the 1997 general election, and the party ultimately selected Mary McAleese as its presidential nominee after internal ballots among prospective candidates including Reynolds and Michael O'Kennedy, with McAleese going on to serve as the eighth president of Ireland.

Reynolds retired from politics at the 2002 general election after 25 years as a TD; asked in 2007 about relations with Ahern, he said, "I don't bear any grudges over Ahern."

Reynolds was involved in a landmark libel action against The Sunday Times concerning a 1994 article about Dáil statements tied to the Brendan Smyth affair; the House of Lords' judgment in Reynolds v Times Newspapers Ltd UKHL 45 established a qualified‑privilege defence for responsible public‑interest journalism later colloquially known as the "Reynolds defence," while Irish reform introduced a "fair and reasonable publication" defence in defamation law.

In 2007, Irish media reported Reynolds's informal involvement in Pakistan–U.S. back‑channel contacts at the request of business associates following General Pervez Musharraf's 1999 coup, including relaying messages to President Bill Clinton and, after 9/11, to President George W. Bush; Reynolds later described the exchanges as aimed at de‑escalation and dialogue, while acknowledging the interruption of nascent India–Pakistan talks by global events.

=== Mahon Tribunal ===
In 1993, Reynolds and Minister for Finance Bertie Ahern wrote to developer Owen O'Callaghan seeking a substantial donation while O'Callaghan was lobbying for state support for a stadium at Neilstown; the Mahon Tribunal found the payment was not corrupt but said soliciting funds in those circumstances was "entirely inappropriate" and an abuse of political power and government authority.

In November 2007, tribunal evidence also addressed fundraising on a New York trip and an unscheduled five‑hour stopover in the Bahamas while on government business, matters that Reynolds contested in subsequent appearances and public statements.

Reynolds's annual pension as a former Taoiseach was reported as €149,740 at the time of a 2011 survey of office‑holder pensions by the Irish Independent.

In July 2008, RTÉ reported that Reynolds was deemed medically unfit to give tribunal evidence because of "significant cognitive impairment," after prior scheduled appearances had been postponed; this determination was furnished to the tribunal and reported publicly at the time.

== Illness and death ==
In December 2013, it was revealed by his son that Reynolds was in the last stages of Alzheimer's disease. Reynolds died on 21 August 2014. The last politician to visit him was former British prime minister Sir John Major, a close friend of Reynolds. The serving Taoiseach, Enda Kenny of Fine Gael, said at the time:

As Taoiseach he played an important part in bringing together differing strands of political opinion in Northern Ireland and as a consequence made an important contribution to the development of the peace process which eventually lead to the Good Friday Agreement.

The funeral was held at the Church of the Sacred Heart, Donnybrook, on 25 August 2014. It was attended by President Michael D. Higgins, Taoiseach Enda Kenny, former British prime minister John Major, former SDLP leader John Hume, Sinn Féin president Gerry Adams, Northern Ireland secretary Theresa Villiers, former president Mary McAleese, former Taoisigh Liam Cosgrave, John Bruton, Bertie Ahern and Brian Cowen, Archbishop of Dublin Diarmuid Martin and the Lord Mayor of Dublin, Christy Burke. Other guests included former ministers Charlie McCreevy, Padraig Flynn, Dermot Ahern and Noel Dempsey, fashion designer Louise Kennedy and racehorse owner J. P. McManus. Another visitor was Jean Kennedy Smith, former US ambassador to Ireland, who was the last surviving sibling of John F. Kennedy. Reynolds was buried at Shanganagh Cemetery with full military honours.

=== Legacy ===
His successor as Fianna Fáil leader, Bertie Ahern, who as Taoiseach was one of the negotiators of peace in Northern Ireland and had long been a political ally and friend, said on Reynolds's death:

I am deeply saddened to learn today of the death of Albert Reynolds. He was not afraid to take political risks to further the path of reconciliation. The Downing Street Declaration paved the way for the IRA ceasefire and all the positives which have flowed from the peace process for people North and South. So much of this achievement has its roots in Albert's courage, perseverance and his commitment to democratic politics.

The Archbishop of Dublin, who attended the service, commented on Reynolds's determined character:

In his life, in his responsibility for the political and economic destiny of those he was called to serve, Albert Reynolds was responsive and creative and determined in his desire to move forward in the search for peace and for a more just, secure and prosperous society.

Former Taoiseach and Fianna Fáil leader Brian Cowen expressed his sadness at the passing of their "close personal friend".

Michael O'Leary, the chief executive officer of Ryanair, said:

As my local TD in what was then the Longford–Westmeath constituency, I had some interaction with him ... I think history will be very kind to him and it should be. In a relatively short period as Taoiseach he achieved a terrific transformation, both in the peace process and also setting Ireland on a period of very rapid economic growth. ... He managed to blow up two coalitions in a relatively short period of time. But I think if you go back and you ask Irish people now if you could have visionary, dynamic and bold leadership like Albert Reynolds ... I think everybody would go back and have Albert in a flash.

== Bibliography ==
=== Writings ===
- Reynolds, Albert, My Autobiography (Dublin 2010)

=== Secondary sources ===
- Coakley, J & Rafter, K Irish Presidency: Power, Ceremony, and Politics (Dublin 2013)
- Kelly, S Fianna Fail, Partition and Northern Ireland, 1926–1971 (Dublin 2013)
- O'Donnell, Catherine, Fianna Fail, Irish republicanism and the Northern Ireland Troubles 1968–2005 (Kildare 2007)
- O'Reilly, Emily, Candidate: The Truth Behind the Presidential Campaign (Dublin 1991)
- Ryan, Tim, Albert Reynolds: The Longford Leader. The Unauthorised Biography (Dublin 1994)

Political offices
Preceded by Pádraig Faulkner	Minister for Posts and Telegraphs; 1979–1981	Succeeded by Patrick Cooney
Preceded by George Colley	Minister for Transport; 1980–1981	Succeeded by Patrick Cooney
Preceded by Michael O'Leary	Minister for Industry and Energy; 1982	Succeeded by John Bruton
Preceded by Michael Noonan	Minister for Industry and Commerce; 1987–1988	Succeeded by Ray Burke
Preceded by Ray MacSharry	Minister for Finance; 1988–1991	Succeeded by Bertie Ahern
Preceded by Charles Haughey	Taoiseach; 1992–1994	Succeeded by John Bruton
Preceded by Bobby Molloy	Minister for Energy; 1992–1993 (acting)	Succeeded by Brian Cowen
Party political offices
Preceded by Charles Haughey	Leader of Fianna Fáil; 1992–1994	Succeeded by Bertie Ahern

Dáil	Election	Deputy (Party)	Deputy (Party)	Deputy (Party)	Deputy (Party)	Deputy (Party)
2nd	1921	Lorcan Robbins (SF)	Seán Mac Eoin (SF)	Joseph McGuinness (SF)	Laurence Ginnell (SF)	4 seats 1921–1923
3rd	1922	John Lyons (Lab)	Seán Mac Eoin (PT-SF)	Francis McGuinness (PT-SF)	Laurence Ginnell (AT-SF)	4 seats 1921–1923
4th	1923	John Lyons (Ind.)	Conor Byrne (Rep)	James Killane (Rep)	Patrick Shaw (CnaG)	Patrick McKenna (FP)
5th	1927 (Jun)	Henry Broderick (Lab)	Michael Kennedy (FF)	James Victory (FF)	Patrick Shaw (CnaG)	Hugh Garahan (FP)
6th	1927 (Sep)	Henry Broderick (Lab)	Michael Kennedy (FF)	James Killane (FF)	Patrick Shaw (CnaG)	Michael Connolly (CnaG)
6th	1930 by-election	Henry Broderick (Lab)	Michael Kennedy (FF)	James Geoghegan (FF)	Patrick Shaw (CnaG)	Michael Connolly (CnaG)
7th	1932	Francis Gormley (FF)	Michael Kennedy (FF)	James Geoghegan (FF)	Patrick Shaw (CnaG)	Seán Mac Eoin (CnaG)
8th	1933	James Victory (FF)	Michael Kennedy (FF)	James Geoghegan (FF)	Charles Fagan (NCP)	Seán Mac Eoin (CnaG)
9th	1937	Constituency abolished. See Athlone–Longford and Meath–Westmeath				

Dáil	Election	Deputy (Party)	Deputy (Party)	Deputy (Party)	Deputy (Party)	Deputy (Party)
13th	1948	Erskine H. Childers (FF)	Thomas Carter (FF)	Michael Kennedy (FF)	Seán Mac Eoin (FG)	Charles Fagan (Ind.)
14th	1951	Erskine H. Childers (FF)	Frank Carter (FF)	Michael Kennedy (FF)	Seán Mac Eoin (FG)	Charles Fagan (Ind.)
15th	1954	Erskine H. Childers (FF)	Frank Carter (FF)	Michael Kennedy (FF)	Seán Mac Eoin (FG)	Charles Fagan (FG)
16th	1957	Erskine H. Childers (FF)	Ruairí Ó Brádaigh (SF)	Michael Kennedy (FF)	Seán Mac Eoin (FG)	Charles Fagan (FG)
17th	1961	Frank Carter (FF)	Joe Sheridan (Ind.)	Michael Kennedy (FF)	Seán Mac Eoin (FG)	4 seats 1961–1992
18th	1965	Frank Carter (FF)	Joe Sheridan (Ind.)	Patrick Lenihan (FF)	Gerry L'Estrange (FG)	4 seats 1961–1992
19th	1969	Frank Carter (FF)	Joe Sheridan (Ind.)	Patrick Lenihan (FF)	Gerry L'Estrange (FG)	4 seats 1961–1992
19th	1970 by-election	Frank Carter (FF)	Joe Sheridan (Ind.)	Patrick Cooney (FG)	Gerry L'Estrange (FG)	4 seats 1961–1992
20th	1973	Frank Carter (FF)	Joe Sheridan (Ind.)	Patrick Cooney (FG)	Gerry L'Estrange (FG)	4 seats 1961–1992
21st	1977	Albert Reynolds (FF)	Joe Sheridan (Ind.)	Seán Keegan (FF)	Gerry L'Estrange (FG)	4 seats 1961–1992
22nd	1981	Albert Reynolds (FF)	Patrick Cooney (FG)	Seán Keegan (FF)	Gerry L'Estrange (FG)	4 seats 1961–1992
23rd	1982 (Feb)	Albert Reynolds (FF)	Patrick Cooney (FG)	Seán Keegan (FF)	Gerry L'Estrange (FG)	4 seats 1961–1992
24th	1982 (Nov)	Albert Reynolds (FF)	Patrick Cooney (FG)	Mary O'Rourke (FF)	Gerry L'Estrange (FG)	4 seats 1961–1992
25th	1987	Albert Reynolds (FF)	Patrick Cooney (FG)	Mary O'Rourke (FF)	Henry Abbott (FF)	4 seats 1961–1992
26th	1989	Albert Reynolds (FF)	Louis Belton (FG)	Mary O'Rourke (FF)	Paul McGrath (FG)	4 seats 1961–1992
27th	1992	Constituency abolished. See Longford–Roscommon and Westmeath				

Dáil	Election	Deputy (Party)	Deputy (Party)	Deputy (Party)	Deputy (Party)	Deputy (Party)
30th	2007	Willie Penrose (Lab)	Peter Kelly (FF)	Mary O'Rourke (FF)	James Bannon (FG)	4 seats 2007–2024
31st	2011	Willie Penrose (Lab)	Robert Troy (FF)	Nicky McFadden (FG)	James Bannon (FG)	4 seats 2007–2024
31st	2014 by-election	Willie Penrose (Lab)	Robert Troy (FF)	Gabrielle McFadden (FG)	James Bannon (FG)	4 seats 2007–2024
32nd	2016	Willie Penrose (Lab)	Robert Troy (FF)	Kevin "Boxer" Moran (Ind.)	Peter Burke (FG)	4 seats 2007–2024
33rd	2020	Sorca Clarke (SF)	Robert Troy (FF)	Joe Flaherty (FF)	Peter Burke (FG)	4 seats 2007–2024
34th	2024	Sorca Clarke (SF)	Robert Troy (FF)	Kevin "Boxer" Moran (Ind.)	Peter Burke (FG)	Micheál Carrigy (FG)

Dáil	Election	Deputy (Party)	Deputy (Party)	Deputy (Party)	Deputy (Party)
27th	1992	Albert Reynolds (FF)	Seán Doherty (FF)	Tom Foxe (Ind.)	John Connor (FG)
28th	1997	Albert Reynolds (FF)	Seán Doherty (FF)	Louis Belton (FG)	Denis Naughten (FG)
29th	2002	Peter Kelly (FF)	Michael Finneran (FF)	Mae Sexton (PDs)	Denis Naughten (FG)
30th	2007	Constituency abolished. See Longford–Westmeath and Roscommon–South Leitrim			
