= Brendan Smyth =

Northern Irish Catholic priest and convicted sex offender

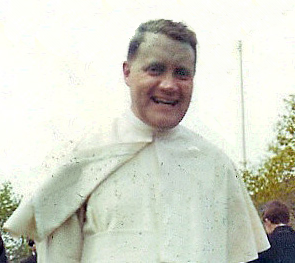
- Smyth, c. 1965
- Born: John Gerard Smyth; 8 June 1927; Belfast, Northern Ireland
- Died: 22 August 1997 (aged 70); Curragh Prison, County Kildare, Ireland
- Resting place: Kilnacrott Abbey
- Occupation: Priest
- Known for: Abuse of children
- Allegiance: Catholic Church
- Convictions: 1994 in Belfast, 43 counts, + 26 later found; 1997 admitted to 74 counts of child sexual abuse
- Criminal charges: 1991 arrested for child sexual abuse, spent three years in the Republic of Ireland before being extradited to Northern Ireland
- Penalty: 1994, 4 years, +3 (concurrent); 12 years (died one month into sentence)

Brendan Smyth, O.Praem (8 June 1927 – 22 August 1997) was a Catholic priest and convicted sex offender from Belfast, Northern Ireland, who became notorious as a child molester, using his position in the Catholic Church to obtain access to his victims. During a period of over 40 years, Smyth sexually abused and indecently assaulted at least 143 children in parishes in Belfast, Dublin and the United States. His actions were frequently hidden from police and the public by Roman Catholic officials. Controversy surrounding his case contributed to the downfall of the government of the Republic of Ireland in December 1994.

== Early life and ordination ==
Born John Gerard Smyth, in Belfast, Northern Ireland, Smyth, upon joining the Norbertine Roman Catholic religious order in 1945, changed his name to Brendan. The Norbertines, also known as the "Premonstratensians," were aware of Smyth's crimes as early as the late 1970s, yet they did not report him to either the Garda Síochána or the Royal Ulster Constabulary. Smyth was moved from parish to parish and between dioceses and countries whenever allegations were made. In some cases, the order did not inform the diocesan bishop that Smyth had a history of sexual abuse and should be kept away from children. He abused children in parishes in Rhode Island and North Dakota and at one time worked in Boston, and was suspected of similar actions while on pastoral work in Wales and Italy. Norbertine Father Bruno Mulvihill made several attempts to alert church authorities about the abuse committed by Smyth.

== 1994 arrest ==
Smyth's first conviction followed the reporting to police of his abuse of four siblings in Belfast's Falls Road. After his arrest in 1991, he fled to the Republic of Ireland, where he spent the next three years on the run, staying mostly at Kilnacrott Abbey. This led to the collapse of the Fianna Fáil–Labour Party coalition government in December 1994 when the poor handling of an extradition request from the RUC by the Irish Attorney General's office led to a further delay of Smyth's trial. An award-winning UTV Counterpoint programme on the scandal by journalist Chris Moore, followed by a book, accused the head of the Norbertines and the Archbishop of Armagh of mishandling the case, and the Norbertines of negligence and a failure to tell others of Smyth's crimes, enabling Smyth to sexually abuse large numbers of children for 40 years.

== Death ==
Smyth died at 70 in prison of a heart attack in 1997 after collapsing in the exercise yard, one month into a 12-year prison sentence. The Norbertines held his funeral before dawn and covered his grave with concrete to deter vandalism. Smyth was buried in Kilnacrott Abbey, which was later put up for sale with 44 acres (18 ha) of land, including the grave.

On 27 October 2005, the title "Reverend" was removed from his gravestone following a campaign by one of Smyth's victims.

== Later investigations ==
Reviewers of the case differ as to whether there was a deliberate plot to conceal Smyth's behaviour, incompetence by his superiors at Kilnacrott Abbey, or some combination of factors. Cahal Daly, both as Bishop of Down and Connor, a diocese where some of the abuse took place, and later as Cardinal Archbishop of Armagh, is recorded as having been privately furious at the Norbertine "incompetence". Smyth's activities were investigated by the Northern Ireland Historical Institutional Abuse Inquiry, finding that: "..despite knowing his history of abusing children, the Norbertine religious order moved Smyth to different dioceses where he abused more children.."

In 2010, Daly's successor as Roman Catholic Archbishop of Armagh, Cardinal Seán Brady, faced "huge pressure to resign" after he admitted that in 1975 he witnessed two teenage boys sign oaths of silence after testifying in a Church inquiry against Smyth. Survivors groups saw this as evidence of collusion, but Brady said he "did not have the authority" to turn Smyth in. On 17 March 2010, the Deputy First Minister for Northern Ireland, Martin McGuinness, called for Brady to resign.

In 2013, some of Smyth's alleged Rhode Island victims between 1965 and 1968, both male and female, called for the Diocese of Providence to investigate Smyth. As of 2019, Smyth is among those listed by the Diocese of Providence as being "credibly accused" of committing sex abuse.

Module 6 of the 2014-2016 Northern Ireland Historical Institutional Abuse Inquiry is dedicated to Smyth's crimes in Northern Ireland.

== Dramatisation ==
A two-part dramatisation of the Smyth case, Brendan Smyth: Betrayal of Trust, was broadcast by the BBC on 13 March 2011 with Ian Beattie in the title role and Richard Dormer as Chris Moore.

== See also ==
- Crimen sollicitationis
- Ferns Report
- Paedophilia
- Roman Catholic priests accused of sex offences
- Catholic Church sexual abuse cases
- Premonstratensians
