= Regina Doherty =

Irish politician (born 1971)

Regina Doherty MEP
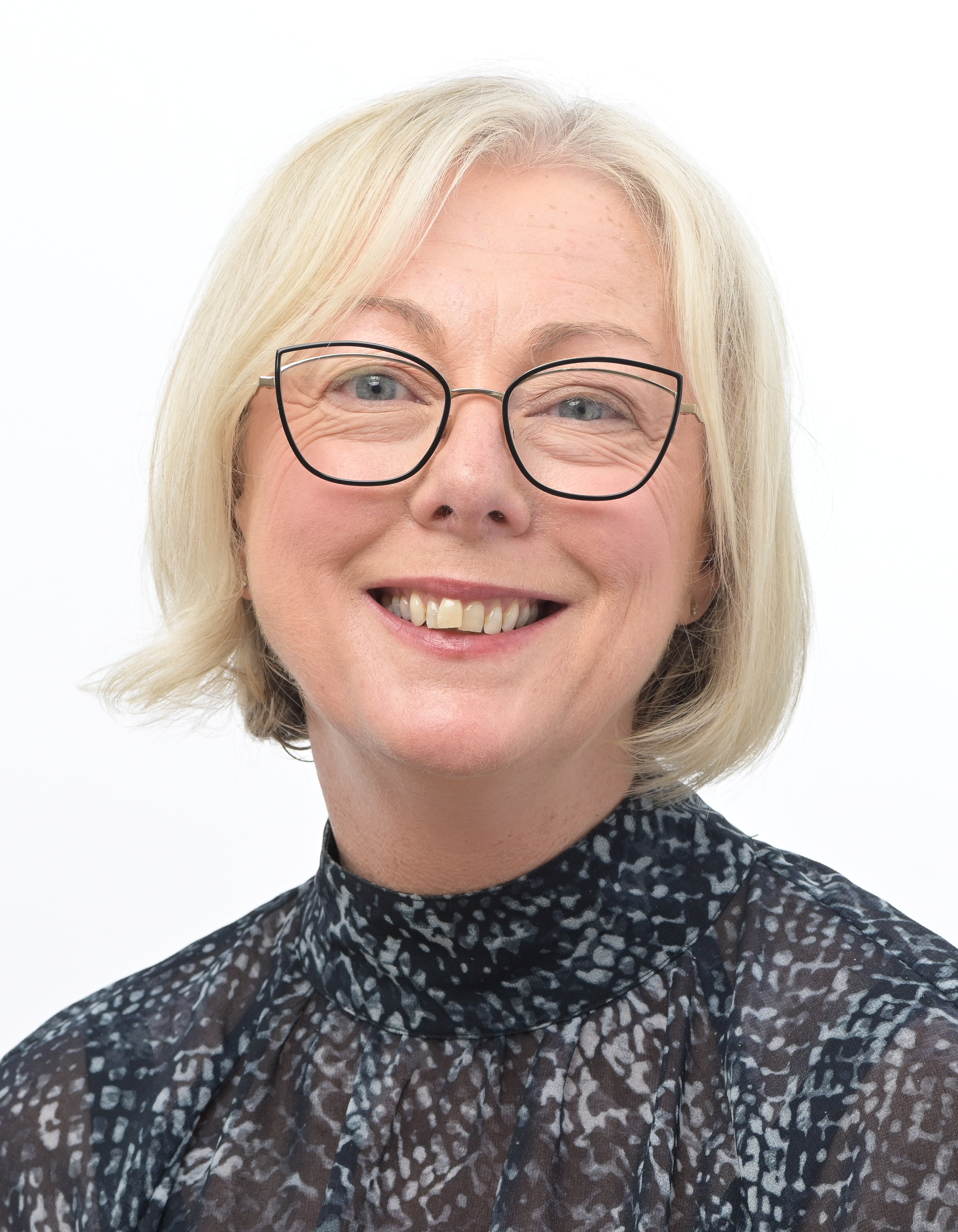
- Doherty in 2024

Member of the European Parliament
- Incumbent
- Assumed office 17 July 2024
- Constituency: Dublin

Deputy leader of the Seanad
- In office 17 December 2022 – 26 June 2024
- Taoiseach: Leo Varadkar; Simon Harris
- Leader: Lisa Chambers
- Preceded by: Lisa Chambers
- Succeeded by: Seán Kyne

Leader of the Seanad
- In office 29 June 2020 – 17 December 2022
- Taoiseach: Micheál Martin
- Deputy: Lisa Chambers
- Preceded by: Jerry Buttimer
- Succeeded by: Lisa Chambers

Leader of Fine Gael in the Seanad
- In office 29 June 2020 – 26 June 2024
- Leader: Leo Varadkar; Simon Harris
- Preceded by: Jerry Buttimer
- Succeeded by: Seán Kyne

Senator
- In office 29 June 2020 – 10 July 2024
- Constituency: Nominated by the Taoiseach

Minister for Employment Affairs and Social Protection
- In office 14 June 2017 – 27 June 2020
- Taoiseach: Leo Varadkar
- Preceded by: Leo Varadkar
- Succeeded by: Heather Humphreys

Minister of State
- 2016–2017: Government Chief Whip

Teachta Dála
- In office February 2011 – February 2020
- Constituency: Meath East

Personal details
- Born: Regina Dalton; 26 January 1971 (age 55) Dublin, Ireland
- Party: Ireland: Fine Gael; EU: European People's Party
- Spouse: Declan Doherty (m. 1997)
- Children: 4
- Education: Dublin City University; King's Inns

Regina Doherty (née Dalton; born 26 January 1971) is an Irish Fine Gael politician who is a Member of the European Parliament (MEP) for the Dublin constituency since the 2024 European Parliament election. She was a Teachta Dála (TD) for the Meath East constituency from 2011 to 2020. She was the Leader of Fine Gael in the Seanad from 2020 to 2024, serving as leader of the Seanad from 2020 to 2022 and Deputy leader of the Seanad from 2022 to 2024. She served as Minister for Employment Affairs and Social Protection from 2017 to 2020 and Government Chief Whip from 2016 to 2017.

== Education ==
In 2018 Doherty completed an Advanced Diploma in Corporate, White-Collar and Regulatory Crime, Law in King's Inns. In 2020 Doherty completed a Post Graduate Fintech (Micro-credential) in Financial Innovation, Business in Dublin City University. In 2022 she obtained a master's degree in Ethics in Dublin City University.

== Political career ==
Doherty was a member of the Meath County Council for the Dunshaughlin local electoral area from 2009 to 2011. She was a member of the Oireachtas committees for Health, Finance and the implementation of the Good Friday Agreement during the 31st Dáil. She was also a member of the Constitutional Convention, and was the Chairperson of the Fine Gael committee for health and children. In May 2015, following the claims of IRA involvement in the cover-up of sexual abuse by Máiría Cahill, she passed on a list of names of a number of alleged abusers within the Provisional Republican Movement to Gardaí who are investigating the issue. She was re-elected to the Dáil at the 2016 general election. She was appointed to the new Dáil reform committee on 22 March 2016. Following the formation of a Fine Gael minority government in May 2016, Doherty was appointed as Minister of State at the Department of the Taoiseach with responsibility as Government Chief Whip, in attendance at cabinet.

On 17 July 2016, it was reported in The Times that Doherty had provided a character reference to a man who had defrauded revenue. Kenneth Shanny from Dunshaughlin, County Meath had been convicted of processing incorrect VAT returns for two clients, with the intention of dividing the money recovered between them. Doherty provided references to the local district court and refused to apologise saying she "would do it again".

On 26 March 2017, it was reported that she had used taxpayer funds to pay her mother €2,150.00 for secretarial services. On 14 June 2017, she was appointed Minister for Employment Affairs and Social Protection, by Taoiseach Leo Varadkar.

In July 2017, Doherty confirmed that she had lodged a complaint with the Garda Síochána against political blogger and academic Catherine Kelly. Kelly said that she was cautioned by Gardaí about her social media posts and online articles, which referenced Regina Doherty. In the Dáil, it was stated that a U.S.-based academic experienced a "sinister and chilling experience" in an Irish airport where she was detained by gardaí and told not to tweet about Doherty or publish any material relevant to her again. In September 2017, it was revealed that she was going to repay an "unlawful" allowance of €15,800 that she received as Government Chief Whip in direct contravention of the law which states that "no allowance can be paid to a party whip if the person is a Minister or Minister of State".

In January 2018, Doherty announced the launch of the consultation process under the review of the Gender Recognition Act 2015, to further expand gender recognition to include those under 18 and non-binary people. In May 2018, Doherty participated in the Opening Plenary Session - Listening Today for Better Social Policies Tomorrow, in the OECD Policy forum in Canada.

In January 2019, Doherty briefed the Irish cabinet, warning that while her department was well fixed to pass emergency legislation to continue social welfare payments in the event of Brexit, the UK may not be. It is understood that the British Government has agreed in principle to continue all payments, although the Secretary of State for Work and Pensions, Amber Rudd, has been unable to guarantee that the necessary legislation will be passed by 29 March 2019. Also in January 2019, Doherty was appointed director of elections for Fine Gael for the 2019 European elections.

=== COVID-19 response ===
Doherty was appointed to the Cabinet Sub-Committee on COVID-19, it published a National Action Plan on 16 March. On 16 March 2020, Doherty announced the COVID-19 Pandemic Unemployment Payment of €350.00, which would be available for six weeks.

On 19 March 2020, Doherty announced that all welfare would be distributed each fortnight instead of the traditional weekly, so as to limit the number of people gathering in post offices. On 17 April, she announced that the General Register Office has put arrangements in place for parents to send in their birth registration forms by email or post. Up to then, parents could only register the births of their children by visiting a General Register Office in person, a practice in place since 1864, when the first birth was registered.

In December 2021, Doherty opposed a motion calling on the government to support a TRIPS waiver on COVID-19 vaccine technology. Doherty withdrew her counter-motion following opposition from within the government coalition.

=== Seanad Éireann ===
At the 2020 general election, Doherty was defeated in Meath East, losing to Darren O'Rourke of Sinn Féin, while her Fine Gael colleague Helen McEntee (Minister of State for European Affairs) was re-elected.

Nationally, Fine Gael fell from 50 to 35 seats in the election. When the 33rd Dáil assembled on 20 February 2020 to elect a Taoiseach, none of the nominees was elected. Leo Varadkar resigned as Taoiseach, but under Article 28.11.2° of the Constitution, all members of the government continued to hold office until the appointment of their successors. Doherty therefore continued as Minister for Employment Affairs and Social Protection until the appointment of Micheál Martin as Taoiseach on 27 June, at the head of a three-part coalition government comprising Fianna Fáil, Fine Gael and the Green Party. On the same day, she was nominated by the Taoiseach to the Seanad, and also appointed as Leader of the Seanad. Her role is to direct government business in the Seanad.

=== Move to Dublin Fingal and European Parliament ===
In September 2020, it was announced that Doherty would seek Fine Gael's nomination to contest the next general election in the Dublin Fingal constituency. According to Doherty, she has connections to the area, with family in north County Dublin and had bought her first home in Swords, County Dublin.

In December 2023, Doherty announced her intention to seek her party's nomination to run for the 2024 European Parliament election in the Dublin constituency. In February 2024, she was selected to contest the election, beating Barry Ward and Josepha Madigan respectively. The election was held on 7 June 2024, and Doherty was elected, coming second on the first count, though taking the first seat. She took office on 17 July 2024.

== Business ==
In January 2013, her IT consultancy company went into liquidation with debts of €280,000, including €60,000 due to the Revenue Commissioners.

Political offices
Preceded by Paul Kehoe	Government Chief Whip; 2016–2017	Succeeded by Joe McHugh
Preceded by Leo Varadkar as Minister for Social Protection	Minister for Employment Affairs and Social Protection; 2017–2020	Succeeded by Heather Humphreys as Minister for Social Protection

Dáil	Election	Deputy (Party)	Deputy (Party)	Deputy (Party)	Deputy (Party)
30th	2007	Thomas Byrne (FF)	Mary Wallace (FF)	Shane McEntee (FG)	3 seats 2007–2024
31st	2011	Dominic Hannigan (Lab)	Regina Doherty (FG)	Shane McEntee (FG)	3 seats 2007–2024
31st	2013 by-election	Dominic Hannigan (Lab)	Regina Doherty (FG)	Helen McEntee (FG)	3 seats 2007–2024
32nd	2016	Thomas Byrne (FF)	Regina Doherty (FG)	Helen McEntee (FG)	3 seats 2007–2024
33rd	2020	Thomas Byrne (FF)	Darren O'Rourke (SF)	Helen McEntee (FG)	3 seats 2007–2024
34th	2024	Thomas Byrne (FF)	Darren O'Rourke (SF)	Helen McEntee (FG)	Gillian Toole (Ind.)
