= Mortgage elimination =

Form of mortgage fraud

Mortgage elimination is a type of mortgage fraud in the United States. In this scam, the promoter first convinces a mortgage holder that the debt that has been contracted is invalid or legally unenforceable, usually due to a combination of alleged technicalities in the note, deed of trust, or other loan documentation signed; the promoters often link their rationale for debt elimination to illegality of certain lending practices, the Federal Reserve, and the monetary system of the United States in general. Through a series of illegal maneuvers involving the creation of a trust, a demand letter, and a false re-conveyance of title, the promoter and the original mortgage holder concert to create the appearance of a title free of liens and encumbrances so that another loan may be taken out on the property.

The United States FBI has put out specific warnings regarding this kind of scam.

As of 2006, the Dorean Group was a high-profile promoter of this type of scam. A number of people, described as the "principals with the Dorean Group", were convicted on multiple counts of fraud in California in 2007.

== See also ==
- Catriona Carey
- Foreclosure rescue scheme
- Rodolphus Allen Family Private Trust, a "trust" which purported to prevent repossession of at-risk properties in Ireland
