= Dominic Hannigan =

Irish former politician (born 1965)

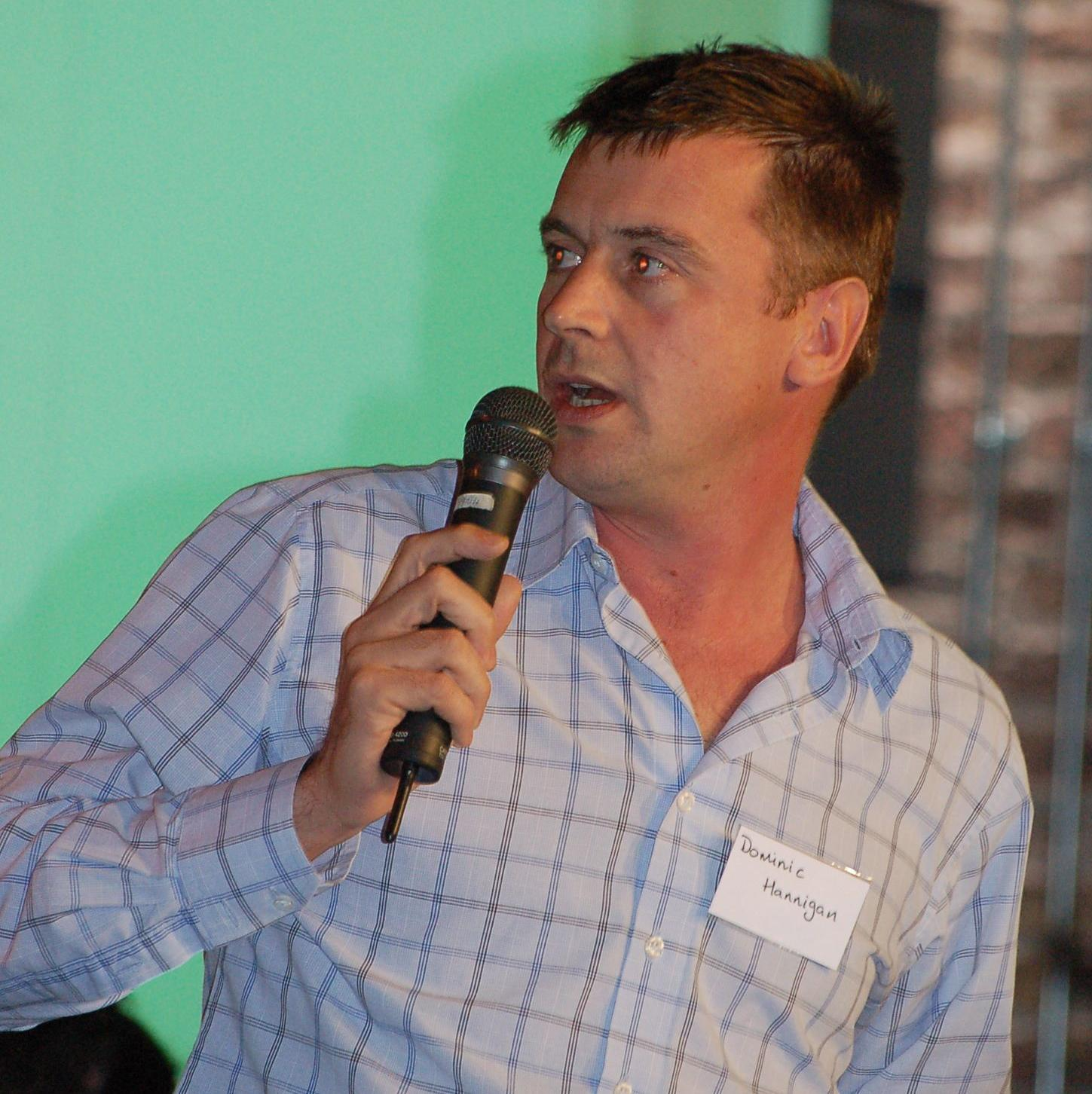

Teachta Dála
- In office February 2011 – February 2016
- Constituency: Meath East

Senator
- In office 13 September 2007 – 25 February 2011
- Constituency: Industrial and Commercial Panel

Personal details
- Born: 1 July 1965 (age 61) Drogheda, County Louth, Ireland
- Party: Labour Party
- Education: University College Dublin; City, University of London; University of London

Dominic Hannigan (born 1 July 1965) is an Irish former Labour Party politician who served a single term as Teachta Dála (TD) for the Meath East constituency from 2011 to 2016, but failed to be re-elected in subsequent elections. He was a Senator for the Labour Panel from 2007 to 2011.

== Early life ==
Hannigan was born in Drogheda, County Louth. He was educated at University College Dublin with a degree in Civil Engineering, at City, University of London with a Masters in Transport and at the University of London with a Masters in Finance. He moved from Ireland to London in 1987. Hannigan returned to Ireland in 2004 and worked as a Civil engineer.

== Political career ==
=== Early years: 2004–2007 ===
Hannigan entered electoral politics when he was elected as an Independent councillor to Meath County Council for the Slane electoral area at the 2004 local elections, serving as chairperson of the council's Planning and Economic Development Committee. Hannigan subsequently joined the Labour Party in October 2004, and first stood for Dáil Éireann at the 2005 Meath by-election, but Hannigan failed to get elected. His next election was the 2007 general election, again failed to get elected, with the third seat going this time to Thomas Byrne.

=== Seanad Éireann: 2007–2011 ===
As part of an election pact between Labour and Sinn Féin for the 2007 elections to Seanad Éireann, Hannigan was elected to the Industrial and Commercial Panel of the Seanad. In Seanad Éireann he was the Labour Party Whip and spokesperson on Commuter Issues, Environment and Local Government, Foreign Affairs and Defence.

He was one of the members of the Oireachtas to support the candidacy of Eamon Gilmore, following the resignation of Pat Rabbitte as leader of the Labour Party on 23 August 2007. He subsequently became the chairman of Eamon Gilmore's leadership campaign to become leader.

In September 2007 he submitted proposals to the Department of Environment and Local Government for town councils for Ashbourne and the Meath coastal area, and called for the abolition of county managers.

Hannigan said in 2011 that population growth during the Celtic Tiger years was more dramatic in Meath than elsewhere in Ireland and that this was having a profound effect on the county's education system. He spoke in favour of a cost-benefit analysis of the proposed Slane bypass in February 2011.

=== Dáil Éireann: 2011–2016 ===
At the 2011 general election Hannigan was elected alongside Fine Gael’s Regina Doherty and Shane McEntee in the three seat Meath East. constituency. In doing so Hannigan became one of the first two openly gay people to be elected to Dáil Éireann, a distinction he shares with Dublin North-West's John Lyons.

The Meath Chronicle compared Hannigan to Speedy Gonzales as he "flitted at high speed from one spot to the next" on the campaign trail. He was "followed by a large posse of journalists and camera crews" when party leader Eamon Gilmore joined him during the campaign.

Hannigan was elected chairman of the Joint Committee on the Implementation of the Good Friday Agreement in June 2011.

He was elected Chairman of the Joint Committee on EU Affairs in January 2012, following which he stepped down as Chairman of the Good Friday Agreement Committee. In a television interview broadcast in April 2012, he confirmed that the 99.8% state-owned bank Allied Irish Banks had paid one-and-a-half billion Euro to unsecured bank bondholders for which neither the bank nor the Irish state had no legal liability.

He lost his seat at the 2016 general election, getting 2,270 first preference votes. He unsuccessfully contested the 2020 Seanad election.

== Post politics ==
Hannigan serves as chairperson and a director of the Lough Mask Distillery in Mayo. He is current Head of Transport Regulation for the National Transport Authority.

== Personal life ==
Hannigan is openly gay.

| Dáil | Election | Deputy (Party) | Deputy (Party) | Deputy (Party) | Deputy (Party) |
|---|---|---|---|---|---|
| 30th | 2007 | Thomas Byrne (FF) | Mary Wallace (FF) | Shane McEntee (FG) | 3 seats 2007–2024 |
| 31st | 2011 | Dominic Hannigan (Lab) | Regina Doherty (FG) | Shane McEntee (FG) | 3 seats 2007–2024 |
| 31st | 2013 by-election | Dominic Hannigan (Lab) | Regina Doherty (FG) | Helen McEntee (FG) | 3 seats 2007–2024 |
| 32nd | 2016 | Thomas Byrne (FF) | Regina Doherty (FG) | Helen McEntee (FG) | 3 seats 2007–2024 |
| 33rd | 2020 | Thomas Byrne (FF) | Darren O'Rourke (SF) | Helen McEntee (FG) | 3 seats 2007–2024 |
| 34th | 2024 | Thomas Byrne (FF) | Darren O'Rourke (SF) | Helen McEntee (FG) | Gillian Toole (Ind.) |
