= Catriona Carey =

Irish hockey and camogie player

Personal information
- Born: 1977 or 1978 (age 47–48) County Kilkenny, Ireland

Sport
- Sport: Field hockey
Senior career
Years	Team	Caps	Goals
–	Hermes Ladies' HC	-	-
National team
Years	Team	Caps	Goals
1998-2006	Ireland	72	-

Catriona Carey is an Irish former international hockey player and camogie player. Convicted of tax offences in 2008 and of theft and fraud in 2020, in early 2022, RTÉ Investigates reported that Carey was connected to fraudulent business practices.

== Sport ==
From Gowran in County Kilkenny, Carey is the sister of hurler D. J. Carey. As a camogie player, Carey was a member of the Clara GAA team that won the Féile na nGael Camogie Division 1 competition in 1992. She later went on to play for the Kilkenny camogie team.

Also playing field hockey, she earned 72 caps for the Ireland women's national field hockey team, including at the 2005 Women's EuroHockey Nations Championship in Dublin. She retired from international competition in 2006, after the 2006 Women's Intercontinental Cup, though continued to play club hockey for Hermes Ladies' Hockey Club. She reportedly rejoined the Irish squad in 2008.

== Financial activities ==
Trained as an accountant, she worked with her brother's cleaning company. In 2008, while at the company, Carey was fined €1,500 after pleading guilty to knowingly producing an incorrect invoice to the Revenue Commissioners in connection with VAT. She was also found guilty of furnishing incorrect information to Revenue in 2006, and claiming a repayment of VAT to which she was not entitled. She resigned within six months of the court hearing. After her departure from the firm, alleged "financial irregularities" were the subject of review by auditors and an investigation by the Garda Bureau of Fraud Investigation. As of 2012, these investigations had "not led to any prosecutions". By 2013, Carey was reportedly associated with a group known as the Rodolphus Allen Family Private Trust.

In 2020, Catriona Carey was convicted of fraud and theft, after forging a cheque to make it payable to her, rather than the payee intended by the business that hired her as an accountant.

In February 2022, RTÉ Investigates reported that she was connected to fraudulent business practices. The RTÉ report referred to an "elaborate scam" and noted that the Gardaí had received several complaints about Carey and her company, Careysfort Asset Estates. An article in the Irish Independent, which described Carey as a "convicted swindler", suggested that the Garda National Economic Crime Bureau (GNECB) had received at least 30 such complaints by late February 2022. The GNECB subsequently seized her car and searched her home as part of an investigation into alleged fraud.

In mid-2022, Carey was given a suspended prison sentence and a four-year driving ban for driving without a licence or insurance while disqualified from driving. She was also sued by Bank of Ireland for reputed outstanding debts and, after "defaulting on her mortgage payments for nearly 10 years", Carey's own home was repossessed in November 2022.

In late 2022, a bench warrant was issued for the arrest of the former secretary of Carey's company, Careysfort Asset Estates. Carey herself was arrested in early 2023 as part of an investigation by the Corporate Enforcement Authority (separate from the parallel GNECB investigation). She was arrested again, as part of the GNECB investigation, on 18 April 2023. After a "lengthy investigation" by the GNECB, a file on Carey's "alleged fraudulent activities" was sent to the Director of Public Prosecutions in March 2024. In December 2024, she was arrested and charged with three offences under the Criminal Justice (Money Laundering and Terrorist Financing) Act 2010.

A number of finance companies, associated with Carey, were "listed to be struck off" by the Companies Registration Office during 2024. The Central Bank of Ireland had previously (in 2022) issued a public warning about her companies. In the United Kingdom, Companies House issued a strike-off notice for Careysfort Asset Estates in 2026.

During the week ending 7 February 2025, Carey appeared in court twice. Firstly, on Tuesday 4 February 2025, she faced 46 charges (arising from the Garda and Corporate Enforcement Authority investigation) on breaching company law. Later that week, on Friday 7 February 2025, Carey faced multiple charges (arising from the Garda National Economic Crime Bureau investigation) for money laundering. A trial date for the money laundering charges was set for January 2027, and a trial date for the charges relating to company law breaches was set for June 2027.

== See also ==
- Mortgage elimination
