= Helen McEntee =

Irish politician (born 1986)

Helen McEntee TD
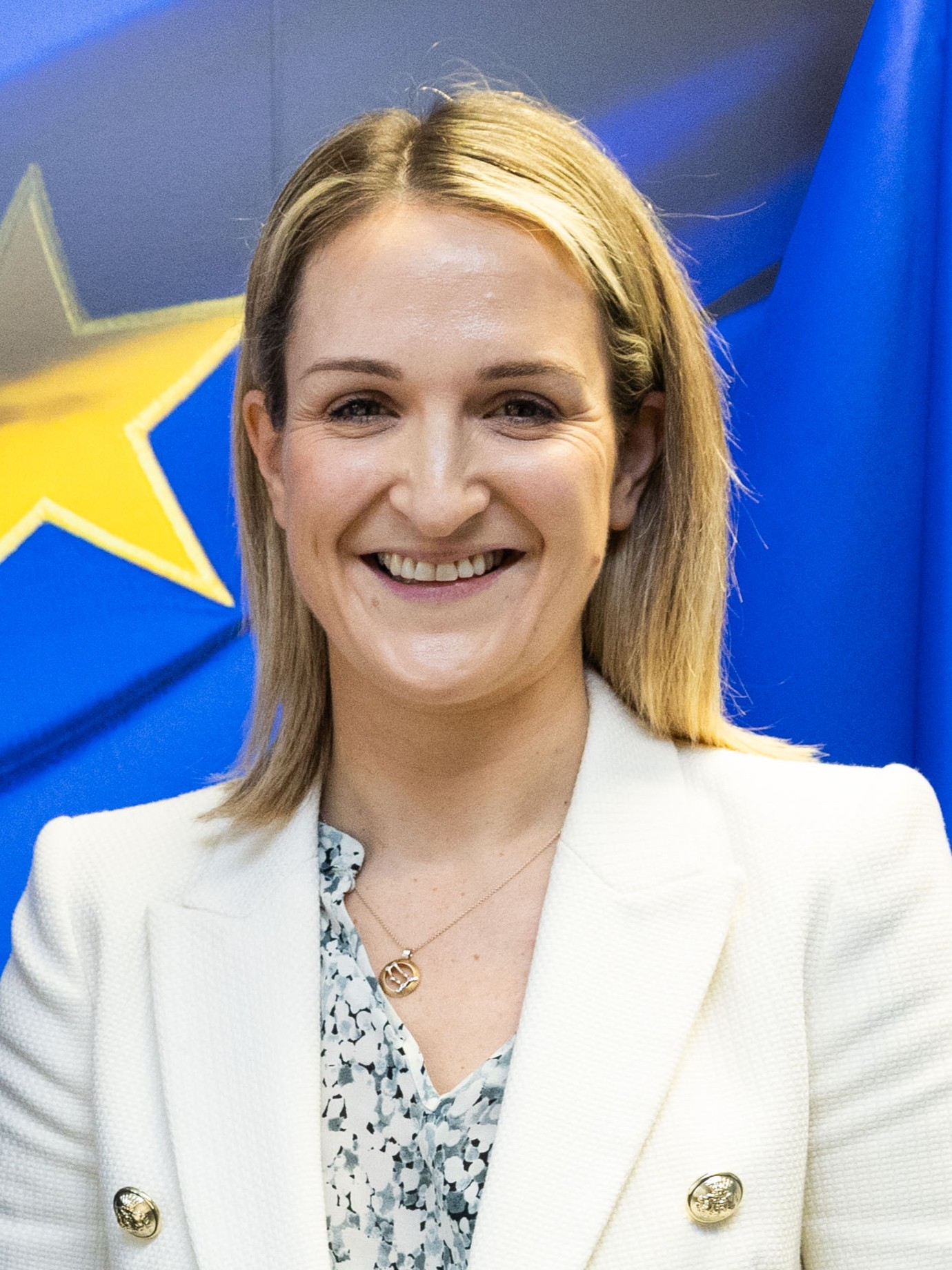
- McEntee in 2026

Minister for Foreign Affairs and Trade
- Incumbent
- Assumed office 18 November 2025
- Taoiseach: Micheál Martin
- Preceded by: Simon Harris

Minister for Defence
- Incumbent
- Assumed office 18 November 2025
- Taoiseach: Micheál Martin
- Preceded by: Simon Harris

Minister for Education and Youth
- In office 23 January 2025 – 18 November 2025
- Taoiseach: Micheál Martin
- Preceded by: Norma Foley
- Succeeded by: Hildegarde Naughton

Minister for Justice
- In office 1 June 2023 – 23 January 2025
- Taoiseach: Leo Varadkar; Simon Harris
- Preceded by: Simon Harris
- Succeeded by: Jim O'Callaghan
- In office 1 November 2021 – 25 November 2022
- Taoiseach: Micheál Martin
- Preceded by: Heather Humphreys
- Succeeded by: Heather Humphreys
- In office 27 June 2020 – 27 April 2021
- Taoiseach: Micheál Martin
- Preceded by: Charles Flanagan
- Succeeded by: Heather Humphreys

Deputy leader of Fine Gael
- Incumbent
- Assumed office 19 October 2024
- Leader: Simon Harris
- Preceded by: Heather Humphreys

Minister of State
- 2017–2020: European Affairs
- 2016–2017: Health

Teachta Dála
- Incumbent
- Assumed office March 2013
- Constituency: Meath East

Personal details
- Born: 8 June 1986 (age 40) Castletown-Kilpatrick, County Meath, Ireland
- Party: Fine Gael
- Spouse: Paul Hickey (m. 2017)
- Children: 2
- Parent: Shane McEntee (father)
- Relatives: Andy McEntee (uncle); Gerry McEntee (uncle); Shane McEntee (cousin)
- Education: Dublin City University; Griffith College
- Website: Fine Gael website

Helen McEntee (born 8 June 1986), is an Irish Fine Gael politician who has served as Minister for Foreign Affairs and Trade and Minister for Defence since November 2025 and deputy leader of Fine Gael since October 2024. A Teachta Dála (TD) for the Meath East constituency since 2013, she previously served as Minister for Education and Youth from January to November 2025, as Minister for Justice from 2020 to 2025 and as a minister of state from 2016 to 2020.

The daughter of Shane McEntee, who served as a Fine Gael TD from 2005 until 2012, she completed a degree in economics, politics, and law at Dublin City University and a master's degree in journalism and media communications at Griffith College. She began working at Leinster House in 2010 as a personal assistant to her father. Following his suicide in December 2012, she successfully contested the 2013 Meath East by-election to replace him; elected at age 26, she became the youngest female TD in the 31st Dáil. Re-elected in the 2016 general election, she served as Minister of State with responsibility for Mental Health and Older People from 2016 to 2017 and as Minister of State for European Affairs from 2017 to 2020.

After retaining her seat at the 2020 general election, she was appointed Minister for Justice in June 2020. She had her first child in April 2021, becoming the first cabinet member in the country's history to give birth or take maternity leave while in office. She had a second child in December 2022. Her justice portfolio was temporarily reassigned to Heather Humphreys and Simon Harris respectively during her two six-month periods of maternity leave in 2021 and 2022–2023. Following Humphreys' decision in October 2024 not to contest the next general election, McEntee succeeded her as deputy leader of the party.

== Early life and career ==
The daughter of Shane and Kathleen McEntee, Helen McEntee is one of four siblings; she has two sisters and a brother. She is the niece of former Gaelic footballer and prominent surgeon Gerry McEntee and of Gaelic football manager Andy McEntee. Raised on her family's farm in Castletown-Kilpatrick, County Meath, she attended St Joseph's Mercy Secondary School in Navan, where she first developed an interest in politics, and represented her class on the school's student council. From 2004, she studied economics, politics, and law at Dublin City University (DCU), where she helped to re-establish the university's branch of Young Fine Gael, which had been inactive for some time. After graduating in 2007, she worked for a subsidiary of Citibank, but returned to higher education in 2010, to complete a master's degree in journalism and media communications at Griffith College.

Her father was first elected to Dáil Éireann as a Fine Gael TD at the 2005 Meath by-election, winning the seat vacated by the resignation of former Taoiseach John Bruton, and was a popular figure with constituents. McEntee began to work in Leinster House as her father's personal assistant in May 2010, while he was an opposition TD. One of the first issues on which she worked with her father was a campaign on behalf of the owners of several thousand houses damaged by the use of pyrite, a material used as backfill during construction, that expands when damp or exposed to air. She considered standing as a candidate in the 2014 local elections, and discussed the prospect with her father, as well as the possibility of one day succeeding him as a member of the Dáil. She moved with him to the Department of Agriculture, Food and the Marine when he was appointed Minister of State after Fine Gael became a party of government following the 2011 general election.

Shane McEntee died by suicide on 21 December 2012, his death triggering a by-election. His brother, Gerry, blamed cyberbullying through social media as a contributing factor in his suicide, and opposition politicians who had criticised him for comments he made about grant cuts to respite care. Fine Gael politician John Farrelly also suggested online abuse as a possible cause, but Helen McEntee has rejected this theory since she had managed her father's social media presence and was not aware of any issues. Speaking to The Sunday Independent during her campaign to succeed her father as a TD, she said that she did not believe he had intended to kill himself, and that she did not think he was depressed. In 2016, she said that she believes her father was "overworked and stressed. In a very short space of time, things went downhill."

== Political career ==
=== 2013 Meath East by-election, and 31st Dáil ===
McEntee was selected to stand as the Fine Gael candidate in the Meath East by-election during a party convention held at the Headfort Arms Hotel in Kells on 7 March 2013. She was the only nominee whose name went forward to contest the seat and the only woman among eleven candidates in the by-election itself. During her campaign, McEntee expressed her wish to continue her father's work while seeking to be "a young fresh voice", and focused on issues such as emigration, employment, and supporting local business. She was joined on the campaign trail by Taoiseach Enda Kenny, who was confronted at a supermarket in Ratoath by an officer of the Garda Síochána angered at having to accept a pay cut because of austerity measures introduced by the government. McEntee participated in a televised debate on RTÉ One's Primetime on 25 March, along with Fianna Fáil candidate Thomas Byrne, Labour's Eoin Holmes, and Sinn Féin's Darren O'Rourke.

She was subsequently elected to Dáil Éireann in the by-election held on 27 March 2013, defeating Byrne (previously a TD for the constituency) with 9,356 first preference votes compared to 8,002 for Byrne. In retaining the seat for Fine Gael she became the first candidate to win a by-election for the party while in government since Taoiseach Kenny succeeded his father as a TD in 1975. At age 26, McEntee became the second youngest TD (after Simon Harris) and the youngest female TD in the 31st Dáil. During the election campaign, Seamus Morris, a Sinn Féin North Tipperary County Councillor, accused the McEntee family of putting their grief to one side to keep their "snouts in the trough". Morris posted the comments on Facebook, but later withdrew them when they were published on the front page of the Irish Daily Mail, and issued an apology; Sinn Féin President Gerry Adams called the remarks "entirely inappropriate".

McEntee took her seat in the Dáil on 16 April 2013, where she received a standing ovation upon entering the debating chamber, and was welcomed by Taoiseach Kenny, as well as other political leaders. She described taking up the seat vacated by her father as "a huge honour", and said that it was an "emotional day for all the McEntee family". The Irish Independent later reported that she had "impressed many...[by her] manner and choice of words to the media as she arrived at Leinster House. 'I drove down to the graveside this morning and had a few words. I think he [her father] called into Michael Collins the morning of his first day, so I called into my hero.'" McEntee gave her maiden speech to the Dáil on 8 May 2013, during a debate about that year's fodder shortage caused by cold spring weather, praising Agriculture Minister Simon Coveney's handling of the issue. She was subsequently appointed to the Oireachtas Committee on Transport and Communications, and the Oireachtas Committee on Environment, Culture and the Gaeltacht.

She spent much of her first term focusing on constituency issues, among them championing the 2013 Pyrite Resolution Act, a €50m compensation scheme for homes affected by the use of pyrite in their construction. She also secured funding for the Slane bypass, as well as increased funding for schools and local community sports projects. In addition, McEntee campaigned for improvements to mobile broadband coverage in Meath and was a vocal supporter of the local agricultural industry. She campaigned for a yes vote in the 2015 referendum concerning the legalisation of same-sex marriage in the Republic of Ireland, and voted in favour of the proposed abolition of Seanad Éireann, the upper house of the Irish parliament. Following a random audit of 22 members of the Oireachtas in 2014, she was one of five politicians required to repay expenses they had claimed that had been declared ineligible. She described the episode, which resulted in her having to repay €1,675.88 of expenses, as being a result of "human error".

=== 2016 general election, and 32nd Dáil ===
McEntee contested the Meath East constituency in the 2016 general election, where she was one of two sitting Fine Gael deputies defending Dáil seats. Elaine Loughlin of the Irish Examiner noted that despite her relatively short time representing the constituency, McEntee had been "visible on the ground, attending community meetings and events", and suggested she would benefit from this at the forthcoming poll, particularly as she had enjoyed a greater presence than her colleagues. Newstalk radio presenter Ivan Yates forecast a win for Fianna Fáil in an area that falls into the Dublin commuter belt but felt that McEntee would hold on to her seat because she is from the largely rural north of the constituency.

McEntee was re-elected to represent Meath East at the election, held on 26 February. She secured a seat in the Dáil on the eighth count, despite not reaching the 50% quota required under STV rules.

In the aftermath of an election that had produced no overall winner, and as Fine Gael parliamentary party secretary, McEntee voiced her support for a proposed Fine Gael–Fianna Fáil coalition, which had been put forward by Kenny and other senior party figures. The move was backed by Fine Gael's backbench TDs at a meeting on 7 April but rejected by Fianna Fáil. McEntee described the proposal as "an historic offer, representing seismic change in the political landscape". She also participated in an internal party inquiry into Fine Gael's poor election performance, as part of a team of TDs who spoke to unsuccessful candidates, but stood down from this position upon her appointment as a junior minister.

=== Minister of State for Mental Health and Older People ===
Kenny formed a minority government after securing the support of several Independent TDs, and on 19 May 2016, appointed McEntee as Minister of State at the Department of Health with responsibility for Mental Health and Older People.

One of her first acts in the post was to help launch an Irish Council for Civil Liberties booklet offering advice to older people on their rights concerning retirement, access to health and community care, pensions, and elder abuse. Shortly after this, she was faced with one of her first major tasks when she was called on to play a role in helping to wind up the affairs of Console, a suicide bereavement counselling charity, after the organisation was plunged into crisis by a scandal involving the misuse of funds. McEntee worked with the charity's chief executive to ensure the services it provided would continue to be available. Console's functions were taken over by Pieta House in July 2016.

On 2 June, and in response to a question from Fianna Fáil's James Browne about government spending on mental health, McEntee told the Dáil the government was committed to an annual increase in funding; Browne had noted that in 2014, €20 million had been allocated to mental health services rather than the promised €35 million, but McEntee said that €35 million had been ringfenced for 2016 and 2017. Along with Minister for Health Simon Harris, McEntee argued for the restoration of €12 million originally ringfenced for mental health spending that had been diverted to other areas. On 8 June, and as part of a €480m bailout package for health, the government announced that the mental health funding would be restored. Welcoming the decision, McEntee said the money would be used for staff recruitment and to improve services for homeless people, as well as developing perinatal mental health services.

On 28 July 2016, the government approved the establishment of a youth mental health task force, a body seeking to increase awareness of mental health issues among children and young people. On 4 August, McEntee announced the make-up of the committee, to be chaired by herself, which would include people from professions such as politics, health, mental health, charities, and sport. She also announced the establishment of a Young Persons’ Reference Group, co-chaired by singer Niall Breslin and mental health adviser Emma Farrell. Speaking about the initiative, McEntee said that its work would "ensure that the voices of our young people are at the core of a more open, more engaging, more supportive national conversation about mental health and wellbeing". The National Taskforce on Youth Mental Health had its inaugural meeting in September.

=== Minister of State for European Affairs ===
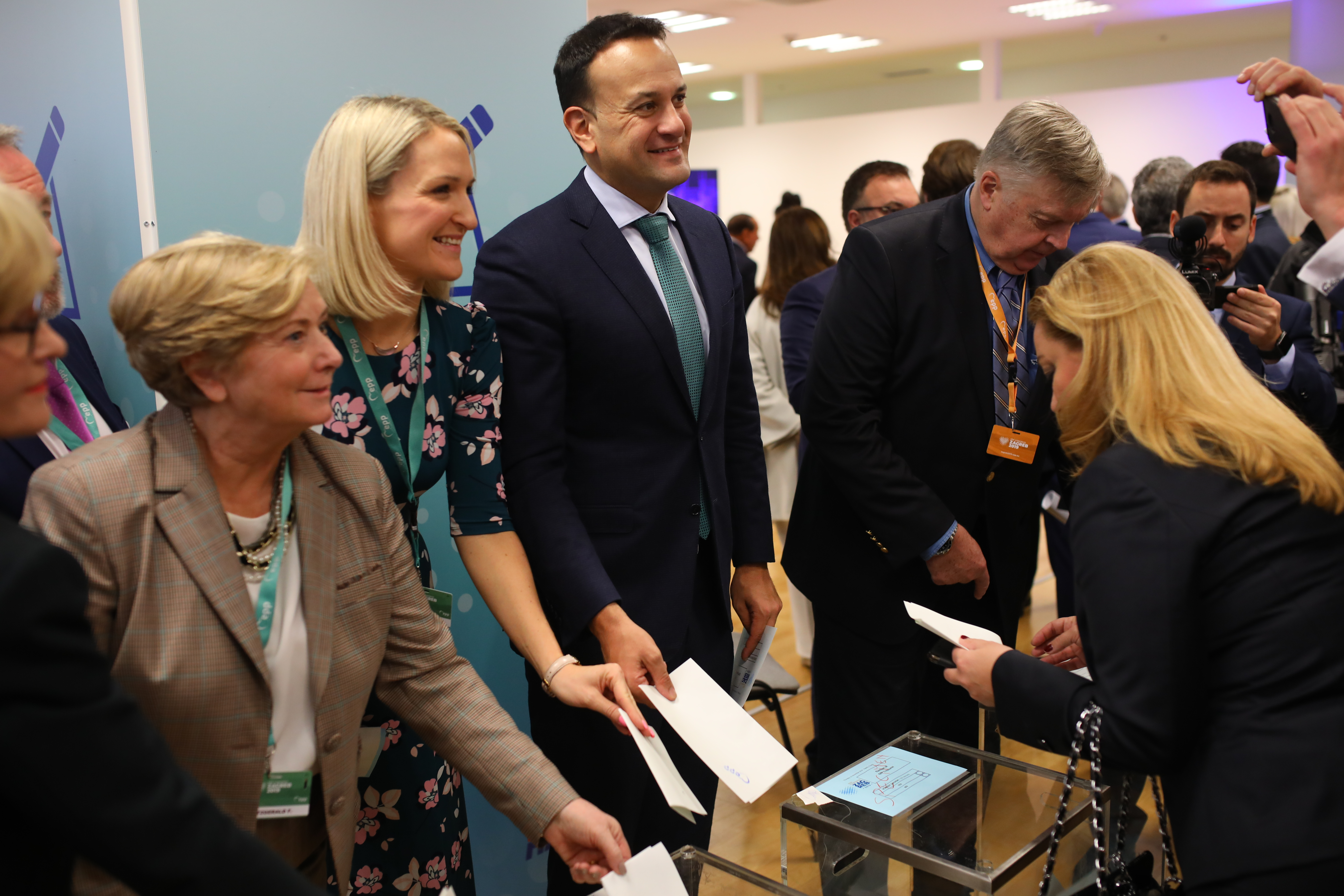
Helen McEntee with Taoiseach Leo Varadkar and Frances Fitzgerald MEP at the 2019 EPP Congress in Zagreb

After Leo Varadkar succeeded Enda Kenny as Taoiseach in June 2017, McEntee was appointed by the new government as Minister of State for European Affairs on 20 June, a role that involved negotiations with the United Kingdom in its continuing Brexit process. Shortly after taking up the position, she travelled with Varadkar to Brussels for a European Council meeting, which included talks with German Chancellor Angela Merkel and her team. In September 2017, she addressed a conference at Dublin City University to mark the foundation of the university's Brexit Institute.

In January 2019, Helen McEntee told the BBC the Irish backstop was necessary, because of the UK's red lines on leaving the European single market and European customs union, to avoid a hard Border and protect the Northern Ireland peace process. She called on the UK to live up to its obligations of the Good Friday Agreement.

McEntee was elected as vice president of the European People's Party (EPP) in November 2019, at the party's Congress in Zagreb.

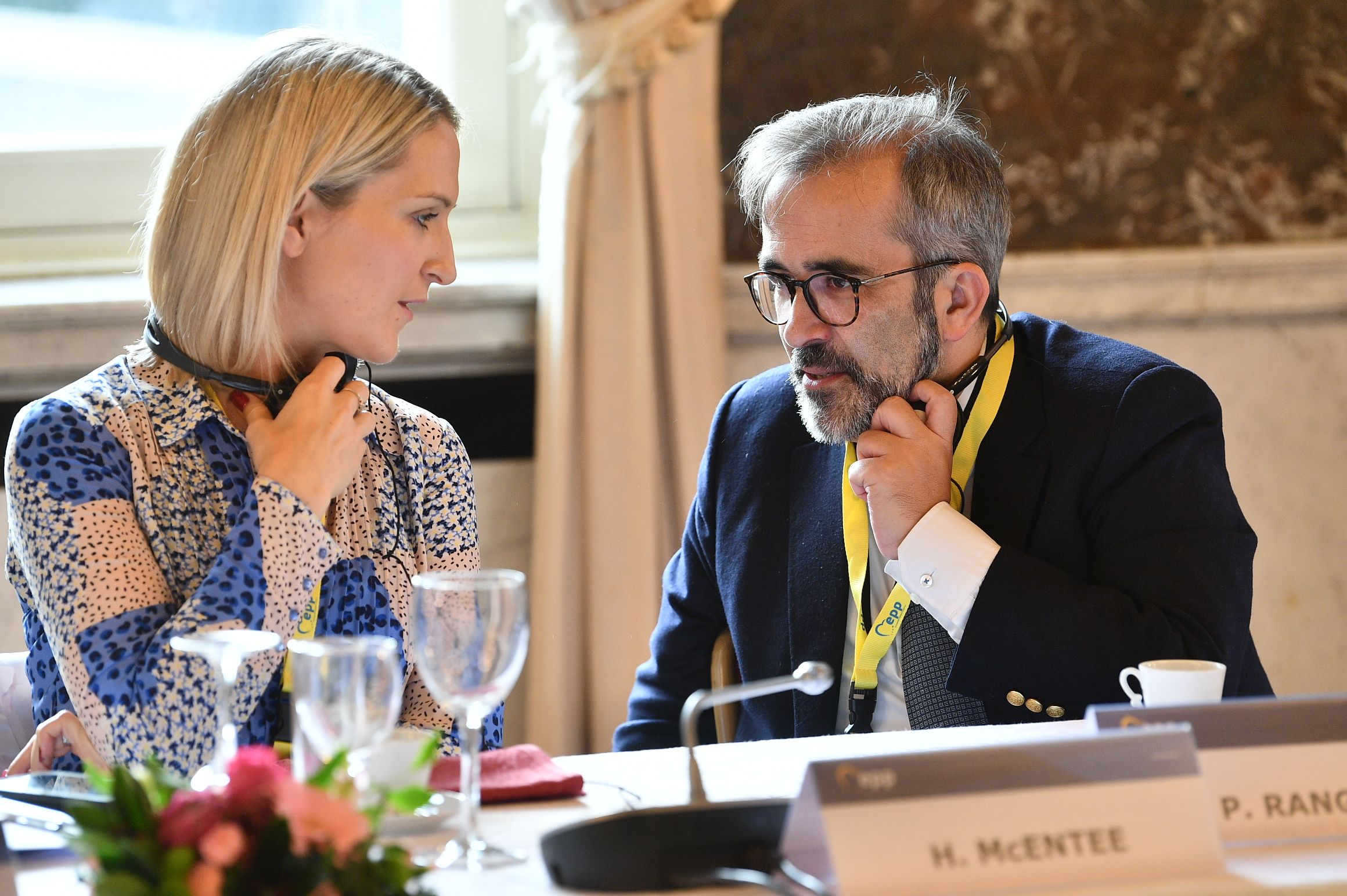
McEntee at a summit in Brussels as Ireland's Minister for European Affairs

=== Minister for Justice ===
At the general election in February 2020, McEntee was re-elected in Meath East, taking the second seat after winning 18% of the first preference votes. The constituency had been seen as a challenge for Fine Gael, with two TDs (both ministers) trying to hold their seats in a 3-seat constituency as Fine Gael's support dipped. McEntee's colleague Regina Doherty TD lost her seat to Darren O'Rourke of Sinn Féin.

After Micheál Martin formed a new government as Taoiseach in June 2020, McEntee was appointed as Minister for Justice as part of a coalition government composed of Fianna Fáil, Fine Gael and the Green Party.

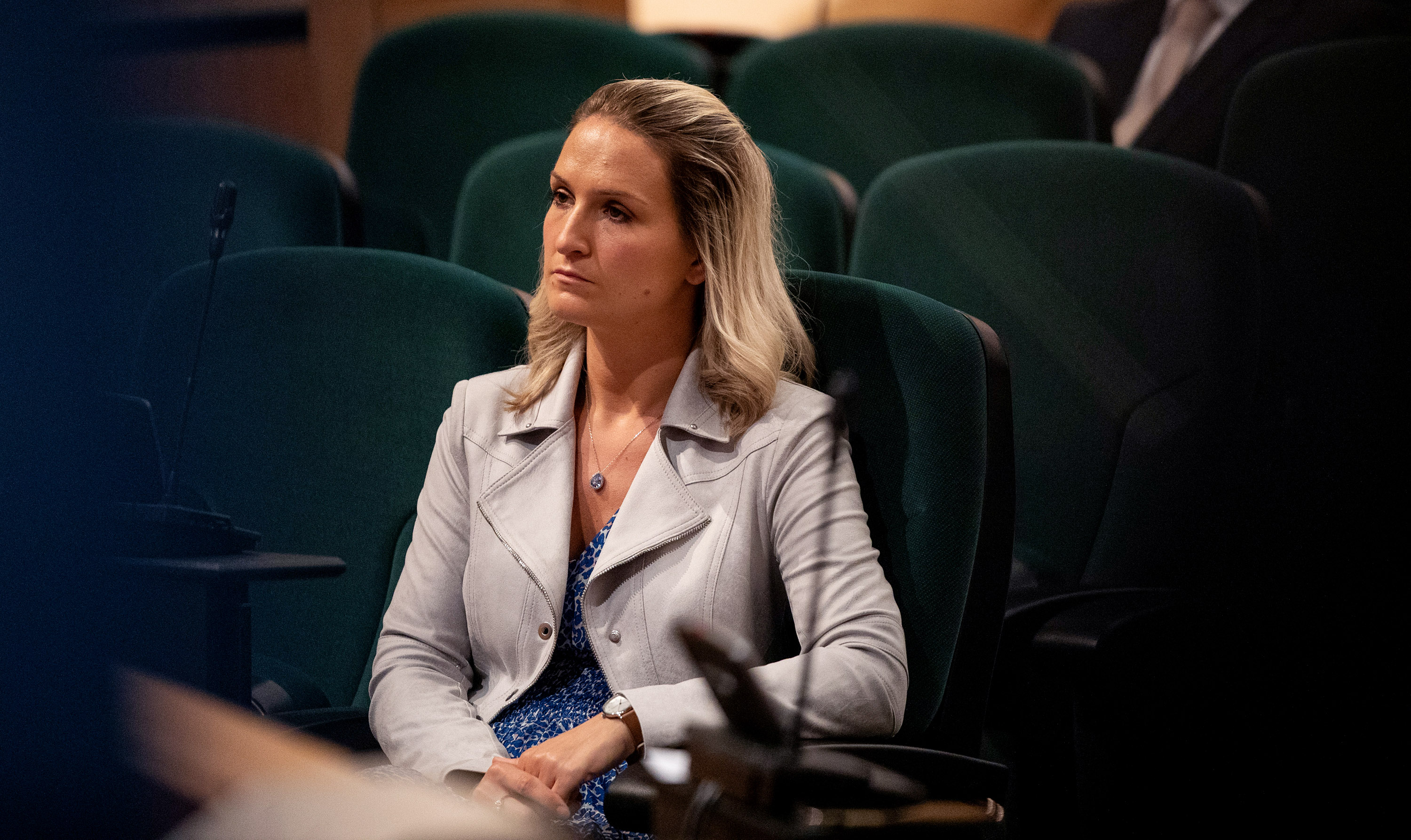
McEntee takes her seat in the Convention Centre Dublin for the election of Micheál Martin as Taoiseach

As Minister for Justice, McEntee oversaw the passage of the Harassment, Harmful Communications and Related Offences Act 2020, which had been introduced in 2017 as a private member's bill by Labour leader Brendan Howlin, following the death of a 21-year-old girl who took her own life after she was bullied on social media. The act makes online harassment and the sharing of personal, intimate images (including revenge porn) a criminal offence.

In December 2020, McEntee announced the government's plans to introduce new hate speech legislation in Ireland. She sponsored the subsequent Criminal Justice (Incitement to Violence or Hatred and Hate Offences) Bill 2022, which passed Dáil Éireann in April 2023, but was later stalled in the Seanad amid concerns about its potential impact on privacy and freedom of speech. The proposed bill drew criticism within Ireland and internationally, including from Elon Musk, who promised that his social media company X would finance legal challenges to the proposed laws if they are introduced. Senior Fine Gael politicians Charlie Flanagan and Michael Ring later called for the legislation to be reconsidered or scrapped. Fianna Fáil TD Willie O'Dea called for his party to abandon the hate speech bill, describing it as “playing to the woke gallery”. McEntee said that people had "valid concerns" about the legislation that she would address.

On 27 April 2021, the Department of Justice was reassigned temporarily to Heather Humphreys as McEntee began six months' maternity leave. McEntee remained in the Cabinet as a minister without portfolio. She was reassigned to the Department of Justice on 1 November 2021. Following the high-profile murder of Ashling Murphy in January 2022, in which a 23-year-old primary school teacher was stabbed to death in Tullamore, McEntee promised a new "zero tolerance" approach to gender-based violence in Ireland. She implemented a five-year, €363 million strategy to combat domestic, sexual and gender-based violence. In December 2022, following Leo Varadkar's appointment as Taoiseach, Simon Harris became Minister for Justice to facilitate a second period of six months' maternity leave. McEntee returned to office on 1 June 2023. She faced criticism over public safety the following month, after teenage boys in Dublin city centre attacked a 57-year-old tourist from Buffalo, New York, inflicting life-changing injuries. Following the attack, the US Embassy in Dublin warned Americans visiting Ireland to keep a low profile and avoid walking alone. Insisting that Dublin city was safe for tourists, McEntee stated that she felt safe in the city, but she also confirmed that the government was failing to reach its recruitment targets for the Garda Síochána.

Opposition parties called on McEntee to resign following the November 2023 Dublin riot. Sinn Féin leader Mary Lou McDonald suggested that McEntee should step down due to what she called the minister's "unacceptable failure" to keep the public safe. Social Democrats TD Gary Gannon also called for McEntee's resignation, terming the riots a "grotesque failure [that] shouldn't go without accountability and consequence." However, McEntee insisted she would not resign, stating: "I am absolutely committed to my work in making sure that I support the gardaí and the commissioner in responding to these mindless thugs." On 6 December 2023, a no-confidence motion in McEntee was tabled by Sinn Féin and countered with a government motion expressing confidence in the minister. The government's confidence motion was passed, by 83 votes to 63.

Following Leo Varadkar's March 2024 announcement that he would step down as Taoiseach and party leader, McEntee was seen as a potential successor, but ruled herself out of the race. She remained as Minister for Justice after Simon Harris became Taoiseach on 9 April. McEntee was subsequently tasked with drawing up legislation to return recently arrived asylum seekers to the UK following the UK Parliament's passage of the Safety of Rwanda Bill, which proposes sending asylum seekers who arrive in the UK to Rwanda, and when it emerged that 80% of recent migrant arrivals in Ireland were from the UK. McEntee faced criticism over her handling of issues relating to asylum seekers, with some commentators suggesting that she was unprepared to handle the issue. On 30 April, Cabinet approved legislation drawn up by McEntee that would re-designate the UK as a "safe country" to which asylum seekers can be returned.

=== Deputy leader of Fine Gael ===
On 19 October 2024, and following the announcement by Heather Humphreys, the deputy leader of Fine Gael, that she would not contest the next general election, McEntee was appointed to replace her as deputy leader by Simon Harris.

=== Minister for Education and Youth ===
On 23 January 2025, she was appointed as Minister for Education and Youth by newly elected Taoiseach Micheál Martin. On 18 November 2025, she was appointed as Minister for Foreign Affairs and Trade and Minister for Defence. She is the state's first female Minister for Foreign Affairs and the first female Minister for Defence.

On 3 January 2026, McEntee called for 'full respect for international law' and the principles of the UN Charter in response to the U.S. military strikes in Venezuela. While stating that President Nicolás Maduro lacked democratic legitimacy, she reiterated Ireland's position that any transition of power must be peaceful and negotiated.

== Politics and views ==
McEntee has sought to raise awareness of suicide-related issues since her father's death, and in 2013 joined the launch of a suicide prevention campaign by the Pieta House charity, aimed at educating rural communities about the early warning signs of suicide. She also took part in a sponsored walk from Dublin to Navan for the See the Light campaign, which seeks to raise awareness of mental health issues. However, she told the Irish Independent that she does not want the focus to be on her father's death every time she attends a suicide prevention event.

Following the publication of a 2016 interdepartmental report into the issue of mental health in the justice system, McEntee stated her belief that it is unacceptable to send people with mental health issues to prison and that this is an issue that must be tackled by the government. She also believes the government should address concerns about the mental health of unemployed young people.

During the 2016 general election campaign, McEntee expressed concern that the area around the Newgrange ancient monument, which is in her constituency, risked becoming a "dead zone" due to restrictive planning provisions applicable in the vicinity, which can limit permission to build homes and facilities. She supports the teaching of politics in schools, as well as lowering the voting age to 16. She also believes more women should be encouraged to go into politics, and as a minister has spoken of her support for the idea of gender quotas as a way of increasing the number of female politicians. She favours the option of extending the Fair Deal scheme to include home care. Michael Brennan, of the Irish Independent has described McEntee's support of small food business as "one of the brightest stories to come out of the recession". On the UK's Brexit process, McEntee has spoken of the importance of building certainty between the UK and EU: "We must deal with the past and lay the foundations of a trusting relationship before we can build the future".

McEntee supported and campaigned for the introduction of same-sex marriage in Ireland in 2015, calling the referendum "an opportunity to show the world that we treat all our citizens as equals". She also supported the repeal of the Eighth Amendment to the Constitution, which legalised abortion in Ireland.

== Personal life ==
McEntee is married to Paul Hickey, who she first met while he was working at Dáil Éireann as a parliamentary assistant to fellow Fine Gael politician Joe McHugh. Hickey proposed to McEntee in January 2016, and the couple were married at St Patrick's Church, Castletown-Kilpatrick, on 7 August 2017.

On 5 December 2020, McEntee announced that she and her husband were expecting their first child. This led to discussions around the lack of parental leave for Irish politicians. She gave birth to a boy in April 2021, making her the first Irish cabinet minister to give birth while in office. On 20 June 2022, McEntee announced that she and her husband were expecting their second child. She gave birth to a boy in December 2022.

== See also ==
- Families in the Oireachtas

Political offices
| New office | Minister of State at the Department of Health; 2016–2017 | Succeeded by Jim Daly |
| Preceded by Dara Murphy | Minister of State for European Affairs; 2017–2020 | Succeeded by Thomas Byrne |
| Preceded by Charles Flanagan as Justice and Equality | Minister for Justice; Nov. 2020 – Apr. 2021 | Succeeded by Heather Humphreys |
| Preceded by Heather Humphreys | Minister for Justice; Nov. 2021–Jan. 2025 | Succeeded by Jim O'Callaghan |
| Preceded by Norma Foley | Minister for Education and Youth; Jan.–Nov. 2025 | Succeeded by Hildegarde Naughton |
| Preceded by Simon Harris | Minister for Foreign Affairs and Trade; 2025–present | Incumbent |
| Preceded by Simon Harris | Minister for Defence; 2025–present | Incumbent |
Party political offices
| Preceded by Heather Humphreys | Deputy leader of Fine Gael; 2024–present | Incumbent |

| Dáil | Election | Deputy (Party) | Deputy (Party) | Deputy (Party) | Deputy (Party) |
|---|---|---|---|---|---|
| 30th | 2007 | Thomas Byrne (FF) | Mary Wallace (FF) | Shane McEntee (FG) | 3 seats 2007–2024 |
| 31st | 2011 | Dominic Hannigan (Lab) | Regina Doherty (FG) | Shane McEntee (FG) | 3 seats 2007–2024 |
| 31st | 2013 by-election | Dominic Hannigan (Lab) | Regina Doherty (FG) | Helen McEntee (FG) | 3 seats 2007–2024 |
| 32nd | 2016 | Thomas Byrne (FF) | Regina Doherty (FG) | Helen McEntee (FG) | 3 seats 2007–2024 |
| 33rd | 2020 | Thomas Byrne (FF) | Darren O'Rourke (SF) | Helen McEntee (FG) | 3 seats 2007–2024 |
| 34th | 2024 | Thomas Byrne (FF) | Darren O'Rourke (SF) | Helen McEntee (FG) | Gillian Toole (Ind.) |
