= Meath East =

Dáil constituency (2007–present)

- Dáil constituency
- Location of Meath East within Ireland
- Interactive map of constituency boundaries since the 2024 general election
- Major settlements: Ashbourne; Dunboyne; Dunshaughlin; Kells; Ratoath

Current constituency
- Created: 2007
- Seats: 3 (2007–2024); 4 (2024–)
- TDs: Thomas Byrne (FF); Helen McEntee (FG); Darren O'Rourke (SF); Gillian Toole (Ind)
- Local government area: County Meath
- EP constituency: Midlands–North-West

Meath East is a parliamentary constituency represented in Dáil Éireann, the lower house of the Irish parliament or Oireachtas. The constituency elects four deputies (Teachtaí Dála, commonly known as TDs) on the system of proportional representation by means of the single transferable vote (PR-STV).

== History and boundaries ==
It was established by the Electoral (Amendment) Act 2005 when the previous 5-seat Meath constituency was divided into two 3-seat constituencies of Meath East and Meath West. It was first used at the 2007 general election to the 30th Dáil.

It spans the eastern portions of County Meath. It includes Nobber, Slane, Dunboyne, Kells and Ashbourne, the constituency's biggest town.

The Electoral (Amendment) Act 2023 defines the constituency as:

"In the county of Meath, the electoral divisions of:

Drumcondra, Grangegeeth, Killary, in the former Rural District of Ardee No. 2;
Culmullin, Donaghmore, Dunboyne, Dunshaughlin, Kilbrew, Killeen, Kilmore, Rathfeigh, Ratoath, Rodanstown, Skreen, in the former Rural District of Dunshaughlin;
Ardagh, Carrickleck, Ceanannas Mór Rural, Cruicetown, Kilmainham, Maperath, Moybolgue, Moynalty, Newcastle, Newtown, Nobber, Posseckstown, Staholmog, Trohanny, in the former Rural District of Kells;
Ardcath, Duleek, Julianstown, Mellifont, Stamullin, in the former Rural District of Meath;
Ardmulchan, Castletown, Domhnach Phádraig, Kentstown, Painestown, Rathkenny, Slane, Stackallan, Tara, in the former Rural District of Navan;
and Ceannanas Mór Urban."

Changes to the Meath East constituency 2007–present
Years	TDs	Boundaries	Notes
2007–2011	3	In County Meath, the electoral divisions of Drumcondra, Grangegeeth, Killary, in the former Rural District of Ardee No. 2; Culmullin, Donaghmore, Dunboyne, Dunshaughlin, Kilbrew, Killeen, Kilmore, Rathfeigh, Ratoath, Rodanstown, Skreen, in the former Rural District of Dunshaughlin; Ardagh, Carrickleck, Cruicetown, Kilmainham, Moybolgue, Moynalty, Newcastle, Newtown, Nobber, Posseckstown, Trohanny, in the former Rural District of Kells; Ardcath, Duleek, Julianstown, Mellifont, St. Mary's (part), Stamullin, in the former Rural District of Meath; Ardmulchan, Castletown, Domhnach Phádraig, Kentstown, Painestown, Rathkenny, Slane, Stackallan, Tara, in the former Rural District of Navan.	Created from Meath
2011–2020	3	In County Meath, the electoral divisions of Drumcondra, Grangegeeth, Killary, in the former Rural District of Ardee No. 2; Culmullin, Donaghmore, Dunboyne, Dunshaughlin, Kilbrew, Killeen, Kilmore, Rathfeigh, Ratoath, Rodanstown, Skreen, in the former Rural District of Dunshaughlin; Ardagh, Carrickleck, Ceanannas Mór Rural, Cruicetown, Kilmainham, Maperath, Moybolgue, Moynalty, Newcastle, Newtown, Nobber, Posseckstown, Staholmog, Trohanny, in the former Rural District of Kells; Ardcath, Duleek, Mellifont, Stamullin, in the former Rural District of Meath; Ardmulchan, Castletown, Domhnach Phádraig, Kentstown, Painestown, Rathkenny, Slane, Stackallan, Tara, in the former Rural District of Navan; and the town of Kells.	Transfer from Meath West of Ceanannas Mór Urban, and of Ceanannas Mór Rural, Maperath and Staholmog in the former Rural District of Kells; and transfer to Louth of Julianstown and St. Mary’s (part in County Meath) in the former Rural District of Meath.
2020–2024	3	In County Meath, the electoral divisions of Grangegeeth, Killary, in the former Rural District of Ardee No. 2; Culmullin, Donaghmore, Dunboyne, Dunshaughlin, Kilbrew, Killeen, Kilmore, Rathfeigh, Ratoath, Rodanstown, Skreen, in the former Rural District of Dunshaughlin; Ceanannas Mór Rural, Cruicetown, Maperath, Moynalty, Newcastle, Newtown, Nobber, Staholmog, in the former Rural District of Kells; Ardcath, Duleek, Mellifont, Stamullin, in the former Rural District of Meath; Ardmulchan, Castletown, Domhnach Phádraig, Kentstown, Painestown, Rathkenny, Slane, Stackallan, Tara, in the former Rural District of Navan; and Ceannanas Mór Urban.	Transfer to Cavan–Monaghan of Ardagh, Carrickleck, Kilmainhamm, Moybolgue, Posseckstown and Trohanny, in the former Rural District of Kells, and Drumcondra in the former Rural District of Ardee No. 2.
2024–	4	In County Meath, the electoral divisions of Drumcondra, Grangegeeth, Killary, in the former Rural District of Ardee No. 2; Culmullin, Donaghmore, Dunboyne, Dunshaughlin, Kilbrew, Killeen, Kilmore, Rathfeigh, Ratoath, Rodanstown, Skreen, in the former Rural District of Dunshaughlin; Ardagh, Carrickleck, Ceanannas Mór Rural, Cruicetown, Kilmainham, Maperath, Moybolgue, Moynalty, Newcastle, Newtown, Nobber, Posseckstown, Staholmog, Trohanny, in the former Rural District of Kells; Ardcath, Duleek, Julianstown, Mellifont, Stamullin, in the former Rural District of Meath; Ardmulchan, Castletown, Domhnach Phádraig, Kentstown, Painestown, Rathkenny, Slane, Stackallan, Tara, in the former Rural District of Navan; and Ceannanas Mór Urban.	Transfer from Cavan–Monaghan of Ardagh, Carrickleck, Kilmainhamm, Moybolgue, Posseckstown and Trohanny, in the former Rural District of Kells, and Drumcondra in the former Rural District of Ardee No. 2. and the transfer from Louth of Julianstown, in the former Rural District of Meath.

== TDs ==
Teachtaí Dála (TDs) for Meath East 2007–
Key to parties: FF = Fianna Fáil; FG = Fine Gael; Lab = Labour; SF = Sinn Féin; Ind. = Independent
Dáil	Election	Deputy (Party)	Deputy (Party)	Deputy (Party)	Deputy (Party)
30th	2007	Thomas Byrne (FF)	Mary Wallace (FF)	Shane McEntee (FG)	3 seats 2007–2024
31st	2011	Dominic Hannigan (Lab)	Regina Doherty (FG)	Shane McEntee (FG)	3 seats 2007–2024
31st	2013 by-election	Dominic Hannigan (Lab)	Regina Doherty (FG)	Helen McEntee (FG)	3 seats 2007–2024
32nd	2016	Thomas Byrne (FF)	Regina Doherty (FG)	Helen McEntee (FG)	3 seats 2007–2024
33rd	2020	Thomas Byrne (FF)	Darren O'Rourke (SF)	Helen McEntee (FG)	3 seats 2007–2024
34th	2024	Thomas Byrne (FF)	Darren O'Rourke (SF)	Helen McEntee (FG)	Gillian Toole (Ind.)

Note: The columns in this table are used only for presentational purposes, and no significance should be attached to the order of columns. For details of the order in which seats were won at each election, see the detailed results of that election.

== Elections ==
*: Outgoing TD

=== 2024 general election ===
2024 general election: Meath East
Party	Candidate	FPv%	Count												
Party	Candidate	FPv%	1	2	3	4	5	6	7	8	9	10	11	12	13
Fine Gael	Helen McEntee	19.9	9,957	9,959	9,959	9,996	10,006								
Sinn Féin	Darren O'Rourke	16.4	8,175	8,177	8,184	8,228	8,272	8,325	8,666	9,095	9,821	12,786			
Fianna Fáil	Thomas Byrne	12.8	6,403	6,405	6,407	6,425	6,432	6,527	6,546	6,855	7,363	7,437	7,520	9,665	10,525
Independent	Gillian Toole	8.9	4,459	4,483	4,491	4,549	4,707	4,749	4,859	5,211	5,952	6,091	6,717	7,194	8,953
Aontú	Emer Tóibín	6.6	3,281	3,285	3,306	3,341	3,608	3,633	3,721	3,871	4,165	4,289	4,785	5,027	
Fianna Fáil	Caroline O'Reilly	6.5	3,223	3,223	3,225	3,248	3,257	3,304	3,335	3,601	3,870	3,918	3,996		
Fine Gael	Sharon Tolan	6.4	3,176	3,178	3,184	3,206	3,210	3,309	3,330	3,747	4,135	4,232	4,389	5,043	5,482
Sinn Féin	Maria White	5.8	2,894	2,900	2,903	2,917	2,939	2,951	3,264	3,568	3,657				
Independent	Joseph Bonner	5.5	2,771	2,781	2,787	2,929	3,028	3,080	3,173	3,477					
Labour	Eilish Balfe	4.1	2,048	2,050	2,051	2,076	2,089	2,440	2,882						
PBP–Solidarity	Clara McCormack (Note: McCormack was a member of People Before Profit.)	2.7	1,380	1,381	1,383	1,434	1,458	1,536							
Green	Ruadháin Bonham	1.7	845	848	849	874	875								
National Party	Jean Murray	1.3	652	653	704	720									
Party for Animal Welfare	Carolyn Fahy	0.4	207	209	210										
Independent	Charles Bobbett	0.4	186	189	190										
Independent	Sivakumar Murugadoss	0.3	135	140	141										
Liberty Republic	Barbara Reid	0.2	119	121											
Independent	Raymond Westlake	0.1	72												
Electorate: 84,272 Valid: 49,983 Spoilt: 338 Quota: 9,997 Turnout: 59.7%

=== 2020 general election ===
2020 general election: Meath East
Party	Candidate	FPv%	Count						
Party	Candidate	FPv%	1	2	3	4	5	6	7
Sinn Féin	Darren O'Rourke	24.4	10,223	10,617					
Fine Gael	Helen McEntee	18.3	7,691	7,856	8,123	8,333	8,937	9,416	12,984
Fianna Fáil	Thomas Byrne	14.4	6,039	6,095	6,348	7,637	8,222	8,999	9,622
Fine Gael	Regina Doherty	10.0	4,180	4,272	4,330	4,505	4,643	5,122	
Green	Seán McCabe	7.8	3,251	3,756	4,036	4,167	4,677	5,999	6,547
Independent	Joe Bonner	7.0	2,934	3,053	3,240	3,338	4,037		
Independent	Sharon Keogan	5.9	2,475	2,570	2,939	3,024			
Fianna Fáil	Deirdre Geraghty-Smith	4.6	1,941	1,977	2,047				
Aontú	Emer Tóibín	3.9	1,634	1,705					
Labour	Annie Hoey	2.1	874						
Solidarity–PBP	Andrew Keegan (Note: Keegan was a member of People Before Profit.)	1.4	569						
Workers' Party	Seamus McDonagh	0.3	134						
Electorate: 66,507 Valid: 41,945 Spoilt: 253 Quota: 10,487 Turnout: 42,198 (63.4%)

=== 2016 general election ===
2016 general election: Meath East
Party	Candidate	FPv%	Count								
Party	Candidate	FPv%	1	2	3	4	5	6	7	8	9
Fianna Fáil	Thomas Byrne	26.1	10,818								
Fine Gael	Helen McEntee	18.3	7,556	7,656	7,671	7,749	7,841	7,887	8,237	8,435	9,958
Fine Gael	Regina Doherty	16.5	6,830	6,889	6,899	6,979	7,064	7,109	7,247	7,477	9,612
Sinn Féin	Darren O'Rourke	14.0	5,780	5,860	5,970	6,017	6,096	6,341	6,637	7,236	8,556
Independent	Joe Bonner	6.0	2,482	2,527	2,545	2,600	2,665	2,857	3,215	3,825	
Labour	Dominic Hannigan	5.5	2,270	2,307	2,325	2,350	2,494	2,525	2,680	3,084	
Social Democrats	Aisling O'Neill	4.1	1,715	1,740	1,801	1,885	2,148	2,300	2,463		
Independent	Sharon Keogan	3.7	1,528	1,579	1,600	1,663	1,709	1,805			
Direct Democracy	Ben Gilroy	1.9	794	809	841	876	899				
Green	Seán Ó Buachalla	1.9	766	784	801	853					
Renua	Sarah Tyrrell	1.3	523	554	563						
Workers' Party	Seamus McDonagh	0.8	326	335							
Electorate: 65,588 Valid: 41,388 Spoilt: 240 Quota: 10,348 Turnout: 63.5%

=== 2013 by-election ===
Fine Gael TD Shane McEntee died on 21 December 2012. A by-election was held to fill the vacancy on 27 March 2013. The seat was won by his daughter Helen McEntee.

2013 by-election: Meath East
Party	Candidate	FPv%	Count		
Party	Candidate	FPv%	1	2	3
Fine Gael	Helen McEntee	38.5	9,356	9,547	11,473
Fianna Fáil	Thomas Byrne	32.9	8,002	8,106	9,582
Sinn Féin	Darren O'Rourke	13.0	3,165	3,370	
Direct Democracy	Ben Gilroy	6.5	1,568	1,793	
Labour	Eoin Holmes	4.6	1,112	1,245	
Green	Seán Ó Buachalla	1.7	423		
Workers' Party	Seamus McDonagh	1.1	263		
Independent	Mick Martin	0.8	190		
Independent	Charlie Keddy	0.5	110		
Independent	Gerard O'Brien	0.3	73		
Independent	Jim Tallon	0.2	47		
Electorate: 64,164 Valid: 24,309 Spoilt: 259 Quota: 12,155 Turnout: 38.3%

=== 2011 general election ===
2011 general election: Meath East
Party	Candidate	FPv%	Count			
Party	Candidate	FPv%	1	2	3	4
Labour	Dominic Hannigan	21.0	8,994	9,383	9,669	12,382
Fine Gael	Shane McEntee	20.6	8,794	8,994	9,142	10,143
Fine Gael	Regina Doherty	20.3	8,677	8,858	9,305	10,447
Fianna Fáil	Thomas Byrne	13.4	5,715	5,892	7,354	8,173
Sinn Féin	Michael Gallagher	8.9	3,795	3,958	4,025	
Independent	Joe Bonner	5.8	2,479	2,866	3,074	
Fianna Fáil	Nick Killian	6.2	2,669	2,719		
New Vision	Sharon Keogan (Note: New Vision was an electoral alliance of independent non-party candidates and did not appear on the ballot.)	2.7	1,168			
Green	Seán Ó Buachalla	1.1	461			
Electorate: 64,873 Valid: 42,752 Spoilt: 346 (0.8%) Quota: 10,689 Turnout: 43,098 (66.4%)

=== 2007 general election ===
2007 general election: Meath East
Party	Candidate	FPv%	Count							
Party	Candidate	FPv%	1	2	3	4	5	6	7	8
Fianna Fáil	Mary Wallace	25.3	10,901							
Fianna Fáil	Thomas Byrne	18.2	7,834	7,866	8,267	8,469	8,628	9,079	9,770	10,077
Fine Gael	Shane McEntee	15.7	6,766	6,789	6,877	6,941	7,106	7,351	7,870	11,619
Labour	Dominic Hannigan	11.9	5,136	5,193	5,337	5,575	6,095	6,554	7,247	8,596
Fine Gael	Regina Doherty	10.1	4,363	4,377	4,508	4,764	4,992	5,164	5,972	
Independent	Brian Fitzgerald	6.0	2,586	2,617	2,659	2,816	3,008	3,334		
Sinn Féin	Joanne Finnegan	3.9	1,695	1,723	1,762	1,859	2,008			
Green	Seán Ó Buachalla	3.1	1,330	1,355	1,417	1,547				
Independent	Joseph Bonner	2.7	1,170	1,195	1,223					
Progressive Democrats	Sirena Campbell	2.2	957	983						
Independent	A. J. Cahill	0.6	269							
Electorate: 67,443 Valid: 43,007 Spoilt: 359 (0.8%) Quota: 10,752 Turnout: 43,366 (64.3%)

== See also ==
- Elections in the Republic of Ireland
- Politics of the Republic of Ireland
- List of Dáil by-elections
- List of political parties in the Republic of Ireland
