= Jennifer Carroll MacNeill =

Irish politician (born 1980)

Jennifer Carroll MacNeill TD
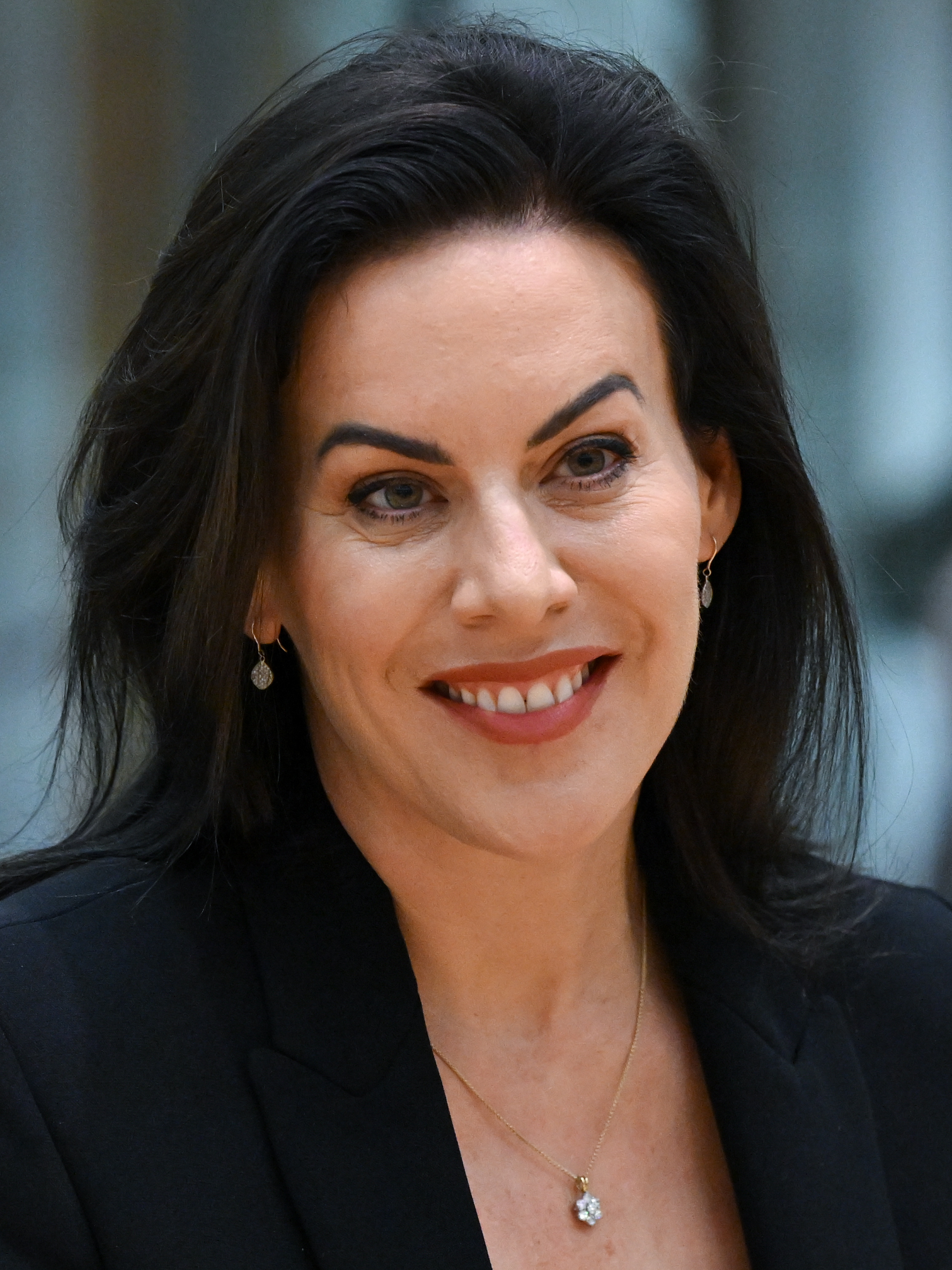
- Carroll MacNeill in 2024

Minister for Health
- Incumbent
- Assumed office 23 January 2025
- Taoiseach: Micheál Martin
- Preceded by: Stephen Donnelly

Minister of State
- 2024–2025: European Affairs
- 2022–2024: Finance

Teachta Dála
- Incumbent
- Assumed office February 2020
- Constituency: Dún Laoghaire

Personal details
- Born: Jennifer Carroll; 5 September 1980 (age 46) Dublin, Ireland
- Party: Fine Gael
- Spouse: Hugo MacNeill (m. 2010)
- Children: 1
- Education: Trinity College Dublin; University College Dublin; King's Inns

Jennifer Carroll MacNeill (née Carroll; born 5 September 1980) is an Irish Fine Gael politician who has served as Minister for Health since January 2025. She previously served as Minister of State for European Affairs from 2024 to 2025 and Minister of State at the Department of Finance from 2022 to 2024. She has been a Teachta Dála (TD) for the Dún Laoghaire constituency since the 2020 general election. She has worked as a solicitor and barrister within the public service and also as a government special advisor.

== Early life ==
She studied Economics and Social Science at Trinity College Dublin, graduating in 2002 with joint honours in Political Science and Business. She later completed a PhD in public policy and Political Science at University College Dublin, with a thesis entitled Institutional Change in Judicial Selection Systems: Ireland in Comparative Perspective, which won the 2015 Basil Chubb Prize for best political science PhD thesis at an Irish university in 2014.

== Political career ==
=== Advisor ===
Carroll MacNeill was a policy advisor to Frances Fitzgerald from April 2011 until June 2013. She then worked for the Minister for Justice and Equality Alan Shatter from September 2013 until his resignation in May 2014. In October 2017, she was appointed as an advisor to Minister for Housing, Planning and Local Government Eoghan Murphy on the National Planning Framework and the creation of the Land Development Agency. She worked with Murphy's office until January 2019 when she left to work for a Public Relations firm.

=== Councillor ===
In May 2019, she was elected to Dún Laoghaire–Rathdown County Council for the Killiney–Shankill local electoral area, a position she held until her election as a TD in February 2020.

=== Teachta Dála ===
In early 2020, Carroll MacNeill was selected internally by the Dún Laoghaire branch of Fine Gael to replace Maria Bailey on the ticket for the 2020 general election, following "Swinggate", a controversy revolving around a dubious legal claim made by Bailey that resulted in her subsequent deselection. At the general election in February 2020, she was elected on the 8th count. Frank McNamara was co-opted to Carroll MacNeill's seat on Dún Laoghaire–Rathdown County Council following her election to the Dáil.

In December 2020, 19-year-old Fine Gael member Dylan Hutchinson dropped his campaign for a council seat after being confronted on a Dublin beach by Jennifer Carroll MacNeill about an alleged derogatory social media post he made about a previous TD. Hutchinson was nominated as a candidate to fill a vacancy on Dún Laoghaire–Rathdown County Council after Barry Ward was elected to the Seanad in April 2020.

Carroll MacNeill was the Vice Chair of the Fine Gael Parliamentary Party and Spokesperson for Equality. She was also Vice Chair of the Justice Committee as well as a member of the Public Accounts Committee, the Implementation of the Good Friday Agreement Committee, the Gender Equality Committee and the Autism Committee and was also a member of the Special Dáil Committee on Covid prior to its disbandment into sectoral Committees.

In December 2022, she was appointed as Minister of State at the Department of Finance with special responsibility for Financial Services, Credit Unions and Insurance following the appointment of Leo Varadkar as Taoiseach.

In April 2024, she was appointed as Minister of State for European Affairs, after Simon Harris became Taoiseach.

At the 2024 general election, Carroll MacNeill was re-elected to the Dáil. On 23 January 2025, Carroll MacNeill was appointed as Minister for Health in the government led by Micheál Martin. In a 2025 interview, she said that women politicians should not be held responsible for "everything related women", resisting questions about whether she would require the next Cabinet to have an equal number of men and women, stating this is "not how government operates".

== Political views and profile ==
Carroll MacNeill has been profiled several times by The Phoenix magazine. The Phoenix has suggested that since becoming a TD in 2020, Carroll MacNeill has been openly positioning herself as a possible future leader of Fine Gael. The Phoenix has described Carroll MacNeill as fiscally conservative and being in favour of means-tested welfare payments as well as low taxes.

Carroll MacNeill has advocated for and highlighted the issues surrounding victims of domestic abuse, such as coercive control. She has been a long-term advocate for coercive control laws. She regularly handed out leaflets at the popular piers in Dun Laoghaire as a message to tell women that they were not alone and to tell perpetrators that this behavior was not acceptable. In her role as Minister of State at the Department of Finance with responsibility for Credit Unions, Financial Services and Insurance, Carroll MacNeill wrote to the organisations to seek their input on a wider credit union bill regarding coercive financial control. Carroll MacNeill said coercive control and domestic and gender-based violence must be treated as a whole-of-government issue.

Carroll MacNeill favours a Two-state solution to the Israeli-Palestine conflict; and was a member of both the Oireachtas Friends of Israel group and the Palestinian friendship group. Whilst Minister for European Affairs, she said Ireland recognising the State of Palestine would help move forward with the self-determination of the Palestinian people. She represented the Irish position at the European General Affairs Council meeting.

Caroll MacNeill favours secularism in education. In a 2024 Hot Press interview she stated that she opposed the Catholic Church's "Flourish" programme for primary schools, describing its content on topics like homosexuality as offensive and inappropriate for a secular education system. Advocating for a new curriculum, she emphasised the importance of teaching personhood, boundaries, and consent, independent of religious doctrine. In the same interview, Carroll MacNeill strongly criticised the Catholic Church for its handling of clerical child abuse scandals, calling their actions disgraceful and their cover-ups appalling. She insisted on full accountability, reparations, and transparency from the Church. Reflecting on her own sex education, she described it as inadequate and influenced by confusing religious frameworks. In July 2022 Carroll MacNeill criticised the pace of the reform of sex education for primary school students, suggesting things were being deliberately "slow-walked".

== Harassment ==
In April 2021, Carroll MacNeill appeared on the panel of the news discussion show The Tonight Show on Virgin Media Ireland. During and after the show, a number of comments on Twitter mocked Carroll MacNeill's physical appearance, which prompted Sinn Féin TD David Cullinane to push back and ask on Twitter "Surely you could make a political point without referring to a person’s appearance. Poor form". Carroll MacNeill thanked Cullinane for his intervention.

In 2022, Gerard Culhane of County Limerick was found guilty in Dublin Circuit Criminal Court of sexually harassing Carroll MacNeill, sending her 10 sexually explicit images and 3 sexually explicit videos, between December 2019 and March 2020, which overlapped with her 2020 general election campaign. On Christmas Day 2019, Culhane sent Carroll MacNeill an image of herself in a swimsuit accompanied by a sexually explicit text message, leading Carroll MacNeill to fear for her safety. Culhane was given a one-year suspended sentence and ordered to stay away from Leinster House as well as to never contact Carroll MacNeill again.

In 2023, it emerged a second man had begun harassing Carroll MacNeill, once again prompting the involvement of the Garda Síochána. In the aftermath, the Gardaí issued general advice to all TDs about their personal safety.

== Author ==
Carroll MacNeill is the author of The Politics of Judicial Selection in Ireland, published in 2016 by the Four Courts Press. Her thesis was given an academic award before being published as a book. David Gwynn Morgan of The Irish Times said of it; "this book by an author of unusual but apt pedigree packs in a lot of new, useful information in a field crying out for it. It is also timely and so is likely to be influential".

== Personal life ==
She is married to former Irish rugby player Hugo MacNeill, the former managing director of Goldman Sachs Investment Banking in Ireland. The couple have one son.

Political offices
| Preceded by Seán Fleming | Minister of State at the Department of Finance; 2022–2024 | Succeeded by Neale Richmond |
| Preceded by Peter Burke | Minister of State for European Affairs; 2024–2025 | Succeeded by Thomas Byrne |
| Preceded by Stephen Donnelly | Minister for Health; 2025–present | Incumbent |

| Dáil | Election | Deputy (Party) | Deputy (Party) | Deputy (Party) | Deputy (Party) | Deputy (Party) |
|---|---|---|---|---|---|---|
| 21st | 1977 | David Andrews (FF) | Liam Cosgrave (FG) | Barry Desmond (Lab) | Martin O'Donoghue (FF) | 4 seats 1977–1981 |
| 22nd | 1981 | David Andrews (FF) | Liam T. Cosgrave (FG) | Barry Desmond (Lab) | Martin O'Donoghue (FF) | Seán Barrett (FG) |
| 23rd | 1982 (Feb) | David Andrews (FF) | Liam T. Cosgrave (FG) | Barry Desmond (Lab) | Martin O'Donoghue (FF) | Seán Barrett (FG) |
| 24th | 1982 (Nov) | David Andrews (FF) | Liam T. Cosgrave (FG) | Barry Desmond (Lab) | Monica Barnes (FG) | Seán Barrett (FG) |
| 25th | 1987 | David Andrews (FF) | Geraldine Kennedy (PDs) | Barry Desmond (Lab) | Monica Barnes (FG) | Seán Barrett (FG) |
| 26th | 1989 | David Andrews (FF) | Brian Hillery (FF) | Eamon Gilmore (WP) | Monica Barnes (FG) | Seán Barrett (FG) |
| 27th | 1992 | David Andrews (FF) | Helen Keogh (PDs) | Eamon Gilmore (DL) | Niamh Bhreathnach (Lab) | Seán Barrett (FG) |
| 28th | 1997 | David Andrews (FF) | Monica Barnes (FG) | Eamon Gilmore (Lab) | Mary Hanafin (FF) | Seán Barrett (FG) |
| 29th | 2002 | Barry Andrews (FF) | Fiona O'Malley (PDs) | Eamon Gilmore (Lab) | Mary Hanafin (FF) | Ciarán Cuffe (GP) |
| 30th | 2007 | Barry Andrews (FF) | Seán Barrett (Note: Served as Ceann Comhairle in the 31st Dáil from 2011 to 2016 and was returned automatically at the 2016 general election.) (FG) | Eamon Gilmore (Lab) | Mary Hanafin (FF) | Ciarán Cuffe (GP) |
| 31st | 2011 | Mary Mitchell O'Connor (FG) | Seán Barrett (FG) | Eamon Gilmore (Lab) | Richard Boyd Barrett (PBP) | 4 seats from 2011 |
| 32nd | 2016 | Mary Mitchell O'Connor (FG) | Seán Barrett (FG) | Maria Bailey (FG) | Richard Boyd Barrett (AAA–PBP) | 4 seats from 2011 |
| 33rd | 2020 | Jennifer Carroll MacNeill (FG) | Ossian Smyth (GP) | Cormac Devlin (FF) | Richard Boyd Barrett (S–PBP) | 4 seats from 2011 |
| 34th | 2024 | Jennifer Carroll MacNeill (FG) | Barry Ward (FG) | Cormac Devlin (FF) | Richard Boyd Barrett (PBP–S) | 4 seats from 2011 |
