= Liberty Republic =

Irish political party

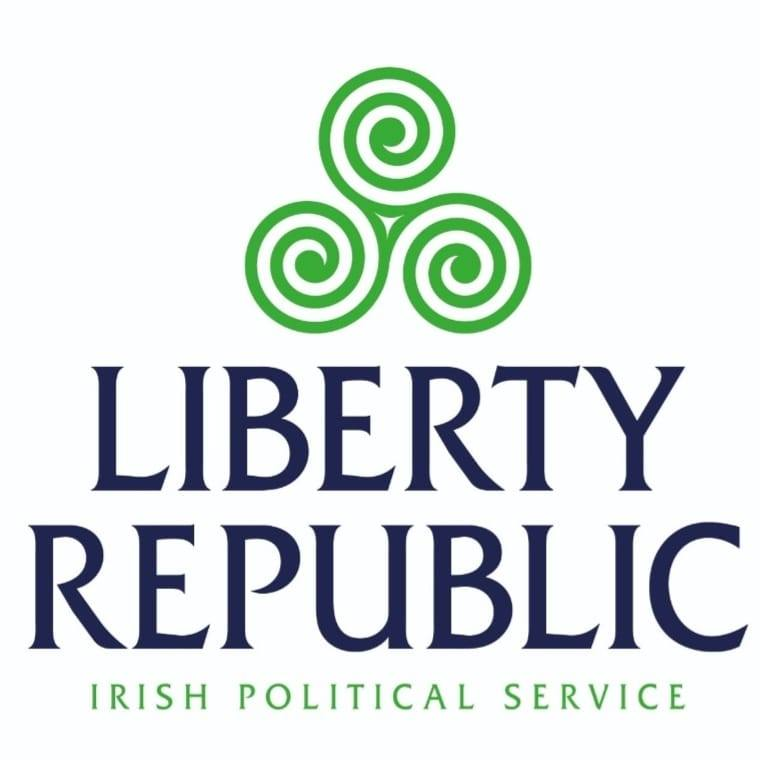
- Leader: Ben Gilroy
- Founder: Raymond Whitehead
- Founded: 2010
- Headquarters: Drogheda, County Meath
- Ideology: Ethnonationalism (since 2024)
- Political position: Far-right (since 2024)
- Former name: Direct Democracy Ireland (DDI)

Website
- libertyrepublic.ie

Liberty Republic is a minor far-right political party in Ireland. It has no representation at local or national level. It was established in 2010 as Direct Democracy Ireland (DDI) and was registered as a political party in October 2012 under that name. The organisation was founded by photographer Raymond Whitehead. It was relaunched as Liberty Republic by activist Ben Gilroy in 2024.

A number of publications have linked the group with various fringe groups and ideologies, including with pseudolegal principles derived from the freeman on the land movement.

== Ideology and policies ==
The party was founded in 2010 with three principal aims:

1. to allow citizens to petition for a referendum on any issue through the collection of a certain number of signatures.
2. to allow for the recall of non-performing politicians.
3. to create realistic economic policies based on public debate.

In 2013, multiple outlets reported that the party was populist in nature.

In 2015 the party suggested that if Ireland were to withdraw from the Eurozone, it could lead to "more stable economic growth".

In the 2024 Irish constitutional referendums, Liberty Republic called for a No vote.

During the 2024 Irish general election, Liberty Republic called for a complete halt to immigration of any kind to Ireland, including legal immigration. The party additionally supported a freeze on rent increases until the housing crisis has subsided, as well as the abolition of the property tax, USC and all carbon taxes.

== Campaigns ==
In July 2013, Ben Gilroy and other members of the party took part in a protest at an auctioneers in Dublin in opposition to the sale of distressed property. Protesters were accused of chanting racist abuse at English staff. The auction had to be cancelled 'in the interest of public safety'. When questioned about the abuse, party spokesperson Des McCreesh told the Irish Independent "I never heard anything like that at all". The following day Gilroy was again questioned over the alleged incident on The Michael Reade Show on LMFM. Gilroy told listeners "I never said any of that [racist abuse]" adding that it would be "wrong to make reference to where [a person] is from at all" and "Direct Democracy and other people did not do that". Presenter Michael Reade then played an audio clip from inside an auction in which Gilroy can be heard telling the auctioneers to "go back to England", Gilroy can then be heard saying: "I'm putting in an objection sir, with your very fine British accent, could you take it forthwith. Leave the country, you and your like that are putting the properties here up for sale." Gilroy admitted the voice in the clip was his but denied his comments amounted to racism, while his party accused radio host Michael Reade of attempting to paint Gilroy as a racist to discredit him. A complaint was lodged by DDI with the Broadcasting Authority of Ireland claiming that Gilroy had been "unfairly treated" and that the LMFM show "misrepresented and created the impression that Mr. Gilroy had expressed anti-English sentiments at the auction". The complaint was rejected by the authority.

On 1 November 2013, Gilroy was arrested by gardaí in Navan and brought before Dublin High Court to face charges over alleged contempt of orders restraining trespass on a County Kildare stud farm to which receivers have been appointed. Gilroy was accused of being part of a "mob" from the Rodolphus Allen Family Private Trust which forced receivers off the €8million stud farm.

== Party leadership and history ==
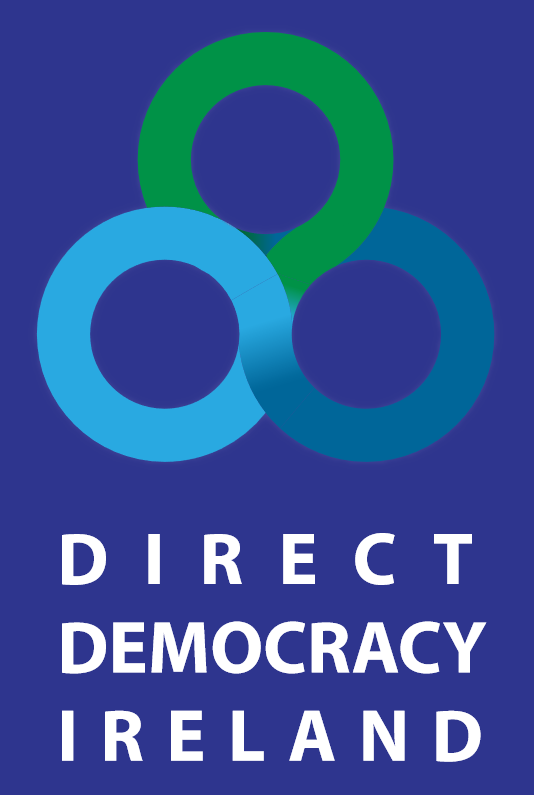
Logo of Direct Democracy Ireland

=== Links ===
A number of publications and commentators have highlighted DDI's close links to the freeman on the land movement and the right-wing conservative Christian Solidarity Party. The then leader of Direct Democracy Ireland (until 2014), Ben Gilroy, denied links to the Freeman movement when questioned about them on the Prime Time current affairs show on RTÉ and by The Irish Times. However, on 24 October 2013 Prime Time ran a 20-minute investigative report which highlighted close links between DDI, People for Economic Justice and DebtOptions Ireland to the Freeman movement. The party also has formal links to the fringe lobbying group known as the National Health Federation which opposes water fluoridation, compulsory childhood vaccines and promotes unproven cancer treatments.

The Christian Solidarity Party also took out advertisements in support of DDI. CSP candidates also included the website of Direct Democracy Ireland on their election literature.

On the abortion issue, DDI says it does not accept that the government must legislate for what it describes as "the so-called X Case". It says the solution to the abortion issue "lies in asking the people" via a referendum whether or not the government has the right to legislate for abortion.

In October 2015, DDI joined the Right2Change movement.

==== National Citizens Movement ====
National Citizens Movement
- Merged into: DDI
- Formation: 9 August 2014
- Founder: Elizabeth Hourihane
- Dissolved: December 2015
- Type: Political group
- Purpose: Political reform, anti-water charges
- Region served: Ireland

The National Citizens Movement (NCM) was formed by Elizabeth Hourihane in Cork, on 9 August 2014 on foot of nationwide anti-water charge protests. The organisation also campaigned against HPV vaccination of schoolgirls. In October 2015, NCM joined the Right2Change movement. In December 2015 it merged with DDI, which subsequently branded itself "Direct Democracy Ireland A National Citizens Movement". Alan Lawes, NCM PRO, ran for DDI in Meath West in the 2016 general election.

=== Split ===
In October 2013, Direct Democracy Ireland split, with a number of members claiming that the five-man "council" responsible for running Direct Democracy Ireland (and which could change the rules as it wished without consulting the membership) was undemocratic. The leadership's alleged links with the Freeman movement and Gilroy's activities in People for Economic Justice were other reasons given for the split. Responding to the claims that the party was completely undemocratic, leader Ben Gilroy said: "We cannot be totally democratic or we’d be dead in the water. The only reason they’re bitching is they’re trying to destroy the party." In October 2013 a number of those who were in dispute with the leadership left and formed the Irish Democratic Party. In February 2014, Ben Gilroy resigned as leader of DDI for "personal reasons". Jan Van De Ven was elected as the new leader at the AGM on 1 February 2014.

On 28 June 2015, at an Extraordinary General meeting of the party held in the Townhouse Court Hotel in Naas, Joe Cunningham was elected as National Chairman of Direct Democracy Ireland, and Pat Greene elected as the party leader.

=== SIPO ===
In June 2015, the Standards in Public Office Commission (SIPO) referred DDI to the gardaí over failure to complete statutory declarations concerning funding and donations.

In November 2017, SIPO stated that some statement of accounts had been received from DDI, but they were found not to be compliant because the accounts were not audited. It decided against appointing a public auditor as DDI did not receive any funding from the exchequer.

== Electoral history ==
At the 2011 general election three candidates stood unsuccessfully as independents under the Direct Democracy Ireland banner. Raymond Whitehead in Dublin South, polling 120 votes (0.2%), Paul Clarke in Dublin North-Central, polling 331 votes (0.85%) and Noel Walshe in Carlow–Kilkenny polling 119 votes (0.2%). During the election, the literature of one known Christian Solidarity Party candidate details an endorsement of direct democracy, with a link to the DDI website.

DDI opposed the children's rights referendum in November 2012. The party claimed that 'vested interests' were using a "historic list of examples of the rape and neglect of children" to grant "power of the agents of the State to 'supply the place of the parents.'" DDI also claimed that a 'Yes' vote could see children "adopted by strangers" if an "over-zealous nurse" contacted social workers with suspicion that a child in their care suffered a non-accidental injury. The referendum was passed with 58% voting in favour.

On 5 March 2013, Direct Democracy Ireland announced party leader Ben Gilroy as its candidate in the Meath East by-election, which was held on 27 March. Gilroy is a leading member of the 'People for Economic Justice' campaign group and has spoken at rallies in support of bankrupt former billionaire developer Seán Quinn who was jailed in 2012 for asset stripping and non-compliance with the Irish Bank Resolution Corporation. During the campaign the leader of the Christian Solidarity Party, Richard Greene, took out an advertisement in support of Ben Gilroy in the conservative Alive! newspaper stating that Gilroy "can be trusted on the abortion issue". He finished fourth, ahead of the Labour and Green candidates. Gilroy criticised the fact that he was not allowed to participate in a Prime Time Debate between the four main parties. Following the election, Gilroy was referred to the Director of Public Prosecutions and the gardaí after he failed to furnish the Standards in Public Office Commission with a detailed breakdown of his expenses and donations during the by-election campaign.

DDI stood four candidates in the 2014 European Parliament election and 19 candidates in the 2014 local elections which were held on the same day. None of the party's 23 candidates were elected.

DDI/National Citizen Movement also stood candidates in the 2016 Irish general election and 2019 European Parliament elections. None were elected.

The party did not stand candidates at the 2020 general election

In 2024, DDI relaunched as Liberty Republic. However, the change to its registration did not take effect before the 2024 Irish local elections and 2024 European Parliament election, in a Tweet from May 2024, Gilroy said that Liberty Republic would not contest those elections.

For the 2024 general election the party fielded candidates in Carlow–Kilkenny (David Egan), Meath East (Barbara Reid) and Cavan-Monaghan (Shane Mulligan). Gilroy himself stood in three constituencies: Meath West, Dublin Fingal East and Dublin Fingal West. They polled 1,936 first-preferences, and won no seats.

== Election results ==
=== Dáil Éireann ===
Election	Leader	1st pref votes	%	Seats	±	Government
2013 by-election	Ben Gilroy	1,568	6.5 (#4)	0 / 1	0	Extra-parliamentary
2016	Pat Greene	6,481	0.3 (#10)	0 / 158	0	Extra-parliamentary
2024	Ben Gilroy	1,936	0.1 (#17)	0 / 174	0	Extra-parliamentary

=== Local elections ===
Election	Seats won	±	First pref. votes	%
2014	0 / 949	Steady	3,607	0.2%
2019	0 / 949	Steady	585	0.03%

=== European Parliament ===
Election	Leader	1st pref Votes	%	Seats	+/−	EP Group
2014	Jan Van De Ven	24,093	1.5% (#8)	0 / 11	New	None
2019	Pat Greene	2,773	0.2% (#13)	0 / 13	-	None
