= Minister for European Affairs =

Minister for European Affairs or Minister of European Affairs may refer to:

- Minister for European Affairs (Finland)
- Minister for European Affairs (Italy)
- Minister of State for Europe, North America and Overseas Territories (United Kingdom)
- Minister of European Affairs (Denmark)
- Minister of State for European Affairs (Ireland)
- Ministry for Europe and Foreign Affairs (France)
