= Ben Gilroy =

Irish political activist and right-wing conspiracy theorist

Leader of Liberty Republic
- Incumbent
- Assumed office 6 April 2024
- Preceded by: Pat Greene
- In office November 2012 – 4 February 2014
- Preceded by: Raymond Whitehead
- Succeeded by: Jan Van De Ven

Personal details
- Born: 1967 or 1968 (age 57–58) Raheny, Dublin, Ireland
- Party: Liberty Republic
- Other political affiliations: Independent (2019; 2021–2024); Irish Freedom Party (2020)
- Spouse: Sarah-Jane Gilroy
- Children: 4
- Known for: Political activism, anti-eviction activism
- Website: bengilroy.ie

Bernard Gilroy (born 1967 or 1968) is an Irish political activist, anti-eviction campaigner and conspiracy theorist who has been leader of the far-right political party Liberty Republic (formerly Direct Democracy Ireland) since 2024, having previously held the position from 2012 to 2014.

Gilroy was once a campaigner against evictions and has been described as a "serial litigant" for his multiple legal actions taken against Irish banks, with AIB having successfully obtained a court order against him for continued frivolous lawsuits. During one of these court hearings, Gilroy threatened and abused the court in a written affidavit and was charged with contempt of court as a result. He was sentenced to 80 hours of community service but failed to attend. As a consequence of his failure to attend the community service, he was subsequently sentenced to 3 months' imprisonment.

Gilroy has been described by the Irish Times as a far-right political candidate. He opposes abortion, Irish membership of the European Union and vaccinations, and has republished a number of conspiracy theories relating to the COVID-19 pandemic in Ireland.

Having stood for election numerous times, Gilroy has never been elected to a political position. He unsuccessfully stood for the European Parliament twice; in Midlands–North-West in 2014 and in the Dublin constituency in 2019. He also unsuccessfully campaigned for a seat in the Dáil in Meath East in a 2013 by-election and 2016 general election. He was an unsuccessful candidate with the far-right Irish Freedom Party in Dublin Bay North at the 2020 general election, and was also unsuccessful, standing for Liberty Republic in multiple constituencies, in the 2024 general election.

== Early and personal life ==
Gilroy is originally from Raheny, Dublin. His mother was from County Westmeath and his father from County Leitrim. He describes himself as uneducated, having left school after the Inter Cert and "qualified from the university of life and the other college of hard knocks". He is a former bodyguard and runs an electrical business from his home in Navan. Gilroy suffered a heart attack in 2015, which he survived, but which he described as leaving him "physically impaired". He is married with four children.

== Politics ==
Gilroy was a founding member of Direct Democracy Ireland (DDI), a minor party advocating for direct democracy to be introduced in Ireland. The party was formed in response to the post-2008 Irish banking crisis and was initially led by Raymond Whitehead. DDI contested the 2011 general election with candidates being fielded as independents, with none elected. Gilroy was elected leader in November 2012.

Gilroy contested the 2013 Meath East by-election which was caused by the suicide of Fine Gael TD, Shane McEntee. Gilroy received 1,568 first-preference votes, 6.5% of those cast. In the wake of the by-election result, Village magazine compared Gilroy to the Italian Five Star Movement leader Beppe Grillo. At the 2014 European Parliament elections, Gilroy was the DDI candidate for the Midlands–North-West constituency. He was eliminated on the 1st count, receiving 7,683 (1.2%) first-preference votes.

He unsuccessfully re-contested Meath East at the 2016 general election. Gilroy was eliminated on the 5th count, receiving 766 (1.9%) first-preference votes.

He was involved with attempts to create an Irish version of the yellow vests movement. He read out a list of yellow vest demands at their first protest in Dublin and was described by some as the movement's leader, however they described themselves as a "leaderless movement". Gilroy was also involved in protests against the eviction of a family in Strokestown, County Roscommon.

Gilroy was an independent candidate for the Dublin constituency in the 2019 European elections. Following an RTÉ decision to not include him and other independent and non-party Dublin candidates in a live television debate, Gilroy brought a legal challenge against the public broadcaster to the High Court. The challenge was subsequently dismissed. On 21 May, he released a campaign video in which he smashed several plasterboards spray painted with the words 'state corruption', 'constitution violations', 'stealing wealth', 'unlawful evictions' and 'RTÉ' with a hurley. It quickly went viral, getting more than 300,000 views overnight.

At the election, Gilroy received 7,594 (2.09%) first-preference votes, and was eliminated on the eighth count. Following the result, he announced that he was stepping back from politics in order to spend time with his family. Eight months later in January 2020, Gilroy was announced as a candidate for the Irish Freedom Party in Dublin Bay North at the 2020 general election. Gilroy was eliminated on the 7th count, with 770 (1%) of first-preference votes.

In 2024, Gilroy announced that he was returning to Direct Democracy Ireland as party leader, and that he would be rebranding it as Liberty Republic. In a promotional video, Gilroy rallied against "globalist elites attempting to put us all under the UN, EU and WEF fascist control through elected traitors".

At the 2024 general election, he ran in three constituencies "for strategic reasons" : Meath West, Dublin Fingal East and Dublin Fingal West. In addition to his own candidacy, Gilroy campaigned with far-right candidates Malachy Steenson (Independent) and Derek Blighe (Ireland First), who stood unsuccessfully in Dublin Central and Cork North-Central, respectively. Gilroy was himself eliminated on the first count in both Fingal West and Meath West, polling 417 and 416 first-preferences, respectively. In Fingal East, Gilroy received 308 votes (0.8%), and was eliminated on the second count.

=== Political views ===
Gilroy's politics were described by The Irish Times as "populist" and later "far-right". He is opposed to abortion, Ireland's membership of the EU, and vaccinations. He has republished a number of conspiracy theories relating to the COVID-19 pandemic in Ireland, as well as debunked claims suggesting attempts were being made to bring sharia law into Ireland. Gilroy has spoken of having "limitless time" for former UKIP leader Nigel Farage.

== Legal issues and convictions ==
On 1 November 2013, Gilroy was arrested by Gardaí in Navan and brought before Dublin High Court to face charges over alleged contempt of orders restraining trespass on a County Kildare stud farm to which receivers have been appointed. Gilroy was accused of being part of a "mob" from the Rodolphus Allen Family Private Trust which forced receivers off the €8 million stud farm.

Gilroy was a serial litigant against Allied Irish Banks which led AIB to take legal action against him in 2017 to prevent him from taking further actions. He was ordered by the court to do 80 hours of community service, which Gilroy did not complete and led to him being found in contempt of court. Gilroy was subsequently jailed for three months in January 2019. He was released on bail pending a High Court challenge to the three-month sentence, but he was ordered by the court to return to jail and complete his original sentence. He was supported by Gemma O'Doherty.

The High Court of Ireland granted AIB an Isaac Wunder order against Gilroy in 2018 for continued frivolous or vexatious cases brought against the bank ostensibly on behalf of various business associates and clients.

During 2020, Gilroy was charged, in a prosecution taken by the Standards in Public Office Commission, for failing to comply with the regulations relating to election expenses following his 2019 European Parliament campaign.

In 2020, Gilroy took a case to the Workplace Relations Committee after being asked to put on a face mask during a trip to a Decathlon store in Ballymun. The case found that Decathlon had not discriminated against Gilroy; following the case, Gilroy said he should have taken his case to the High Court.

In 2022, a mortgage company issued a repossession order for Gilroy's home. An appeal filed by Gilroy was rejected by the Supreme Court, who said Gilroy had not raised any points of importance that needed to be heard.
