= 2013 Meath East by-election =

By-election to the 31st Dáil

- 27 March 2013
- Turnout: 24,568 (38.3%)
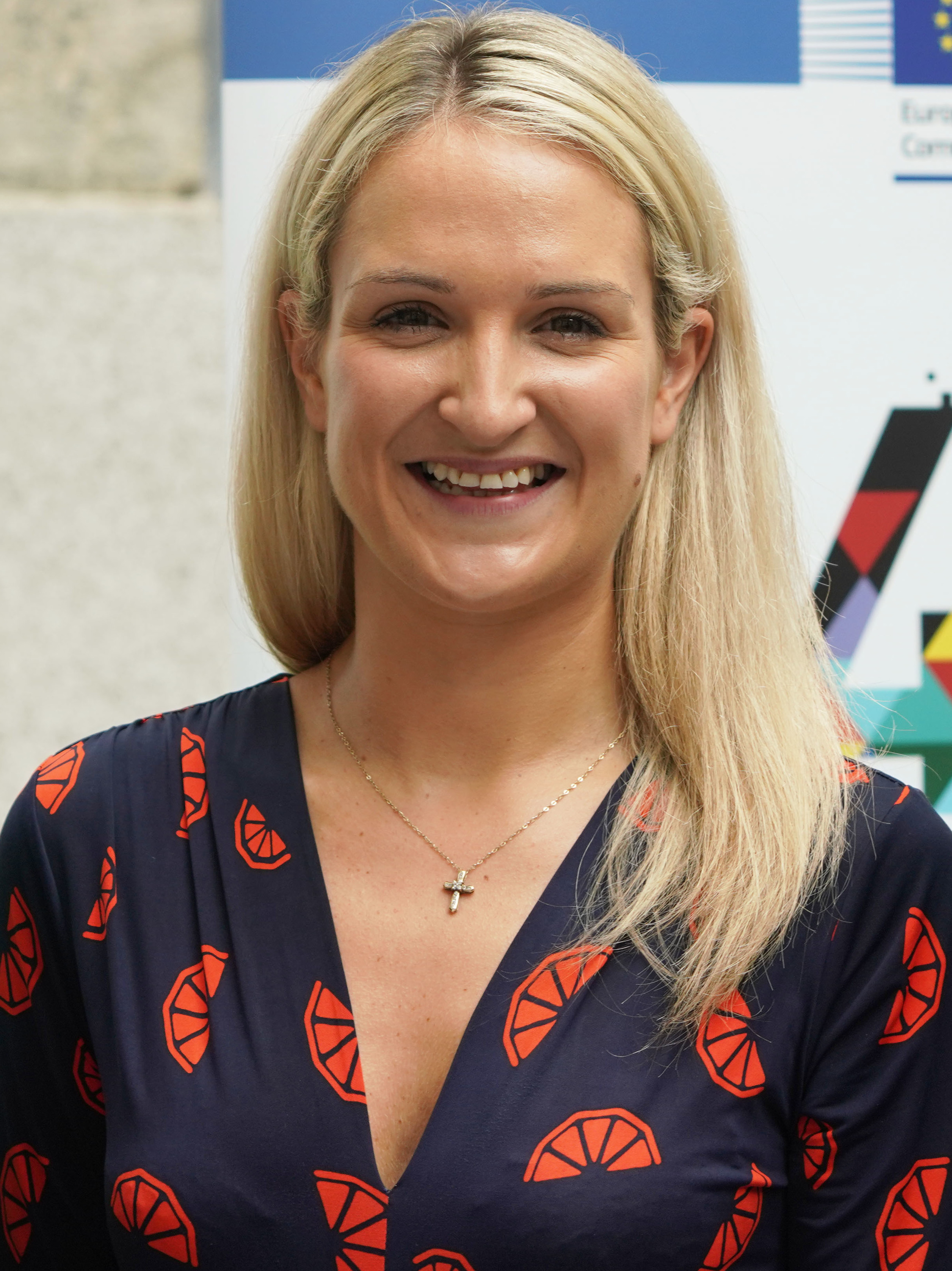

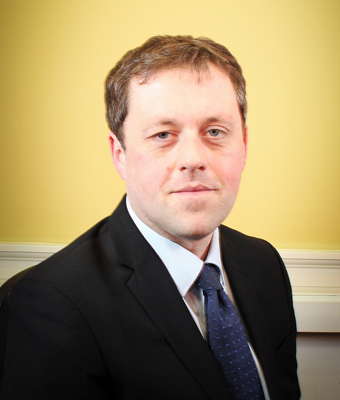

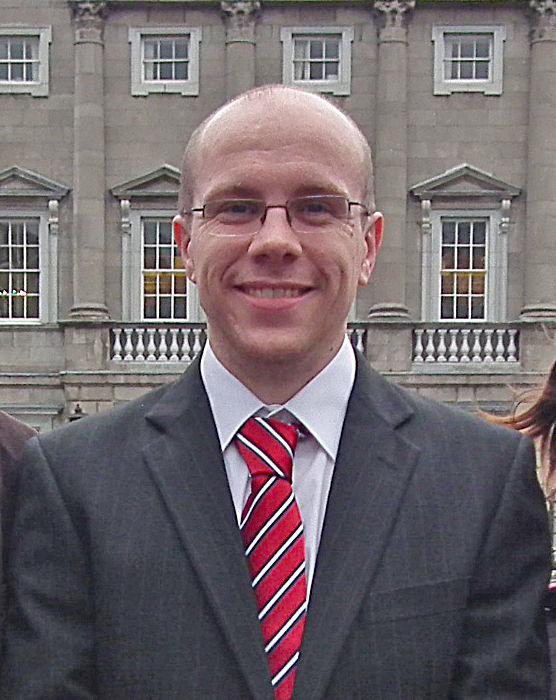
Nominee	Helen McEntee	Thomas Byrne	Darren O'Rourke
Party	Fine Gael	Fianna Fáil	Sinn Féin
First preferences	9,356	8,002	3,165
Percentage	38.5%	32.9%	13.0%
Final count	11,473	9,582	–
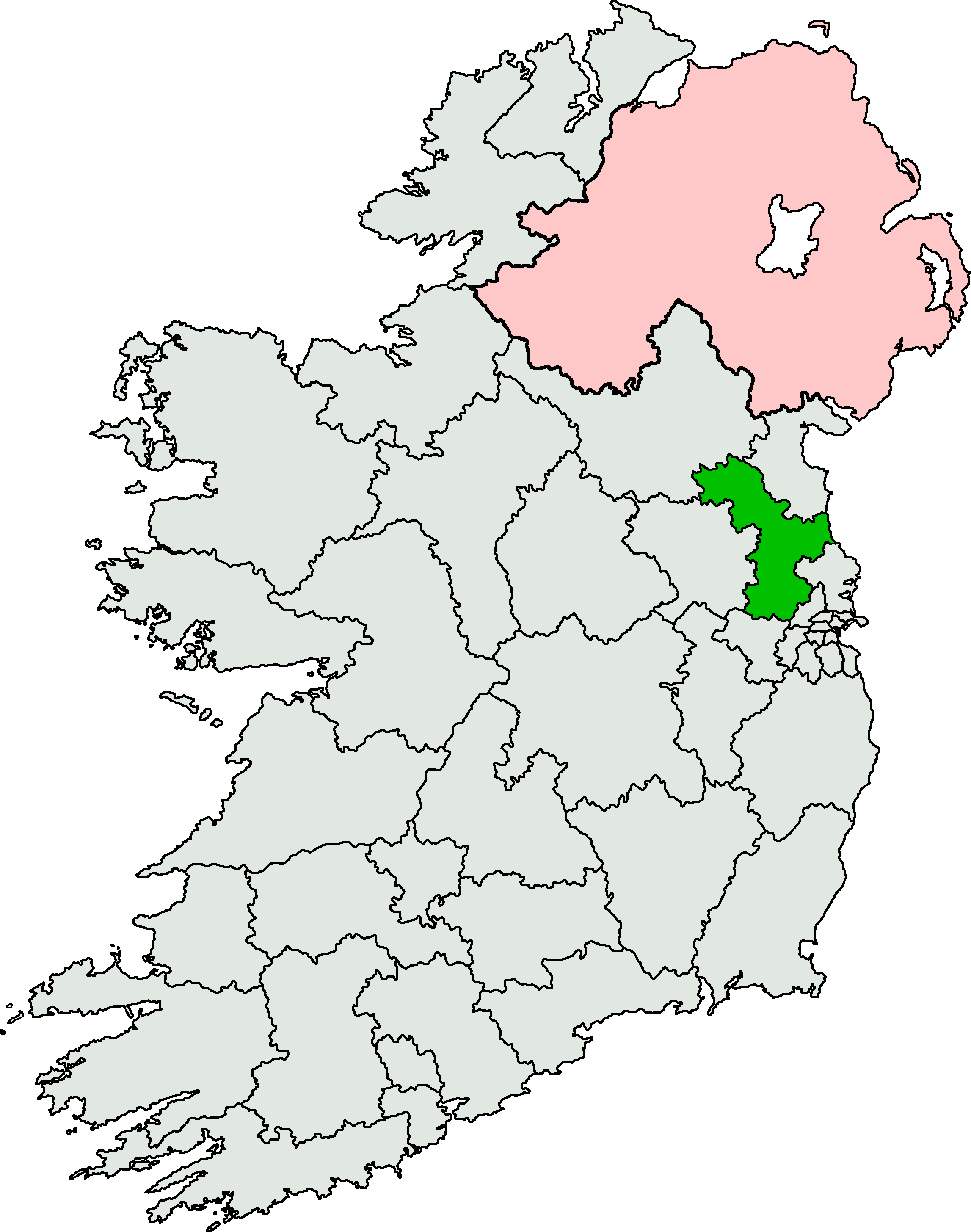
- Meath East shown within Ireland
TD before election
Shane McEntee
Fine Gael
TD after election
Helen McEntee
Fine Gael

A Dáil by-election was held in the constituency of Meath East in Ireland on Wednesday, 27 March 2013, to fill a vacancy in the 31st Dáil. It followed the death of the Fine Gael Teachta Dála (TD) Shane McEntee on 21 December 2012.

The Electoral (Amendment) Act 2011 stipulates that a by-election in Ireland must be held within six months of a vacancy occurring. The electorate of Meath East at the 2011 general election was 64,873.

Fine Gael candidate Helen McEntee, daughter of the deceased TD, was elected on the third count.

== Candidates ==
On 22 February 2013, both Fianna Fáil and Sinn Féin selected their candidates for the by-election. Fianna Fáil selected Senator Thomas Byrne, a former TD for the constituency. Sinn Féin selected Darren O'Rourke, a medical scientist who worked as a health policy advisor to Caoimhghín Ó Caoláin TD. The Workers' Party announced that Seamus McDonagh, a spokesperson for the local Campaign Against the Household and Water Taxes (CAHWT) campaign, would contest the election.

On 5 March, the Green Party selected Seán Ó Buachalla as its candidate, a youth club development officer, while Direct Democracy Ireland announced that their leader, Ben Gilroy, would be contesting the election. On 7 March, Fine Gael selected Helen McEntee, daughter of Shane McEntee, as its candidate. On 9 March, the Labour Party selected Meath County Councillor Eoin Holmes.

There were four independent candidates: Charlie Keddy, Mick Martin, Gerard O'Brien and Jim Tallon.

== RTÉ debate ==
An RTÉ Prime Time television debate held on 25 March featured candidates from the four main parties: Fine Gael, Labour Party, Fianna Fáil and Sinn Féin. The other candidates were excluded, including the Green Party, DDI and Workers' Party candidates. Workers' Party candidate Seamus McDonagh said the Prime Time editor had no "consistent criteria" for this decision, and criticised the lack of an invitation to even sit in the audience despite having, he said, the support of several TDs. DDI's Ben Gilroy said RTÉ "just basically ignored us completely."

== Result ==
2013 Meath East by-election
Party	Candidate	FPv%	Count		
Party	Candidate	FPv%	1	2	3
Fine Gael	Helen McEntee	38.5	9,356	9,547	11,473
Fianna Fáil	Thomas Byrne	32.9	8,002	8,106	9,582
Sinn Féin	Darren O'Rourke	13.0	3,165	3,370	
Direct Democracy	Ben Gilroy	6.5	1,568	1,793	
Labour	Eoin Holmes	4.6	1,112	1,245	
Green	Seán Ó Buachalla	1.7	423		
Workers' Party	Seamus McDonagh	1.1	263		
Independent	Mick Martin	0.8	190		
Independent	Charlie Keddy	0.5	110		
Independent	Gerard O'Brien	0.3	73		
Independent	Jim Tallon	0.2	47		
Electorate: 64,164 Valid: 24,309 Spoilt: 259 Quota: 12,155 Turnout: 24,568 (38.3%)

Fine Gael candidate Helen McEntee finished first on the first count with 9,356 votes (38.5%), while Fianna Fáil's Thomas Byrne came second with 8,002 votes (32.9%). McEntee was elected on the third count with 11,473 votes. The Labour Party candidate Eoin Holmes, got 4.6%, down from 21.0% that Labour received at the 2011 general election, and finished fifth behind new party Direct Democracy Ireland.

It is the first time since 1975 that Fine Gael have won a by-election while in government.
