= Darren O'Rourke =

Irish politician

Darren O'Rourke TD
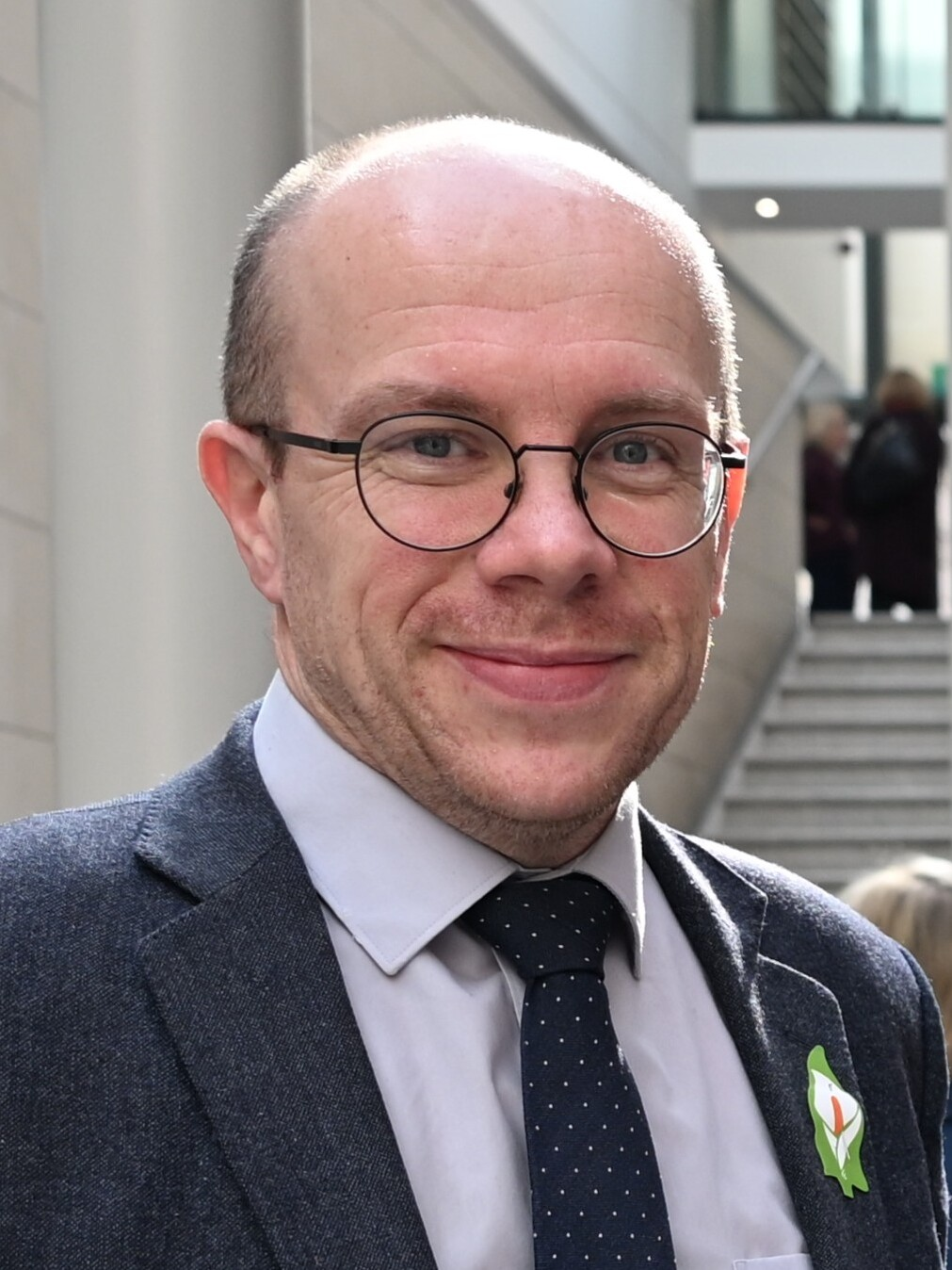
- O'Rourke in 2026

Teachta Dála
- Incumbent
- Assumed office February 2020
- Constituency: Meath East

Personal details
- Born: 1979/1980 (age 45–46)
- Party: Sinn Féin
- Spouse: Maria O'Kane
- Children: 3
- Education: Dublin Institute of Technology; Trinity College Dublin; Dublin Business School; Royal College of Surgeons; Maynooth University

Darren O'Rourke (born 1979/1980) is an Irish Sinn Féin politician who has been a Teachta Dála (TD) for the Meath East constituency since the 2020 general election.

== Background ==
Originally from Kells, O'Rourke trained in Dublin Institute of Technology and holds a number of master's degrees from Trinity College Dublin and the Royal College of Surgeons in Ireland. He was a medical scientist at St. James's Hospital in Dublin.

== Political career ==
O'Rourke was previously a policy advisor to Caoimhghín Ó Caoláin TD. He was the Sinn Féin candidate at the 2013 Meath East by-election, which was won by Fine Gael's Helen McEntee. He was unsuccessful again at the 2016 general election, but at the 2020 general election he topped the poll with 24.4% of the first-preference votes, and was elected on the second count.

He was a member of Meath County Council for the Ashbourne local electoral area from 2014 to 2020. Aisling Ó Néill was co-opted to O'Rourke's seat on Meath County Council following his election to the Dáil.

In 2022, O'Rourke put forward a bill to require all pharmaceutical companies to make their payments to healthcare organisations and professionals public in a register.

Dáil	Election	Deputy (Party)	Deputy (Party)	Deputy (Party)	Deputy (Party)
30th	2007	Thomas Byrne (FF)	Mary Wallace (FF)	Shane McEntee (FG)	3 seats 2007–2024
31st	2011	Dominic Hannigan (Lab)	Regina Doherty (FG)	Shane McEntee (FG)	3 seats 2007–2024
31st	2013 by-election	Dominic Hannigan (Lab)	Regina Doherty (FG)	Helen McEntee (FG)	3 seats 2007–2024
32nd	2016	Thomas Byrne (FF)	Regina Doherty (FG)	Helen McEntee (FG)	3 seats 2007–2024
33rd	2020	Thomas Byrne (FF)	Darren O'Rourke (SF)	Helen McEntee (FG)	3 seats 2007–2024
34th	2024	Thomas Byrne (FF)	Darren O'Rourke (SF)	Helen McEntee (FG)	Gillian Toole (Ind.)
