= Thomas Byrne (Meath politician) =

Irish politician (born 1977)

Thomas Byrne TD
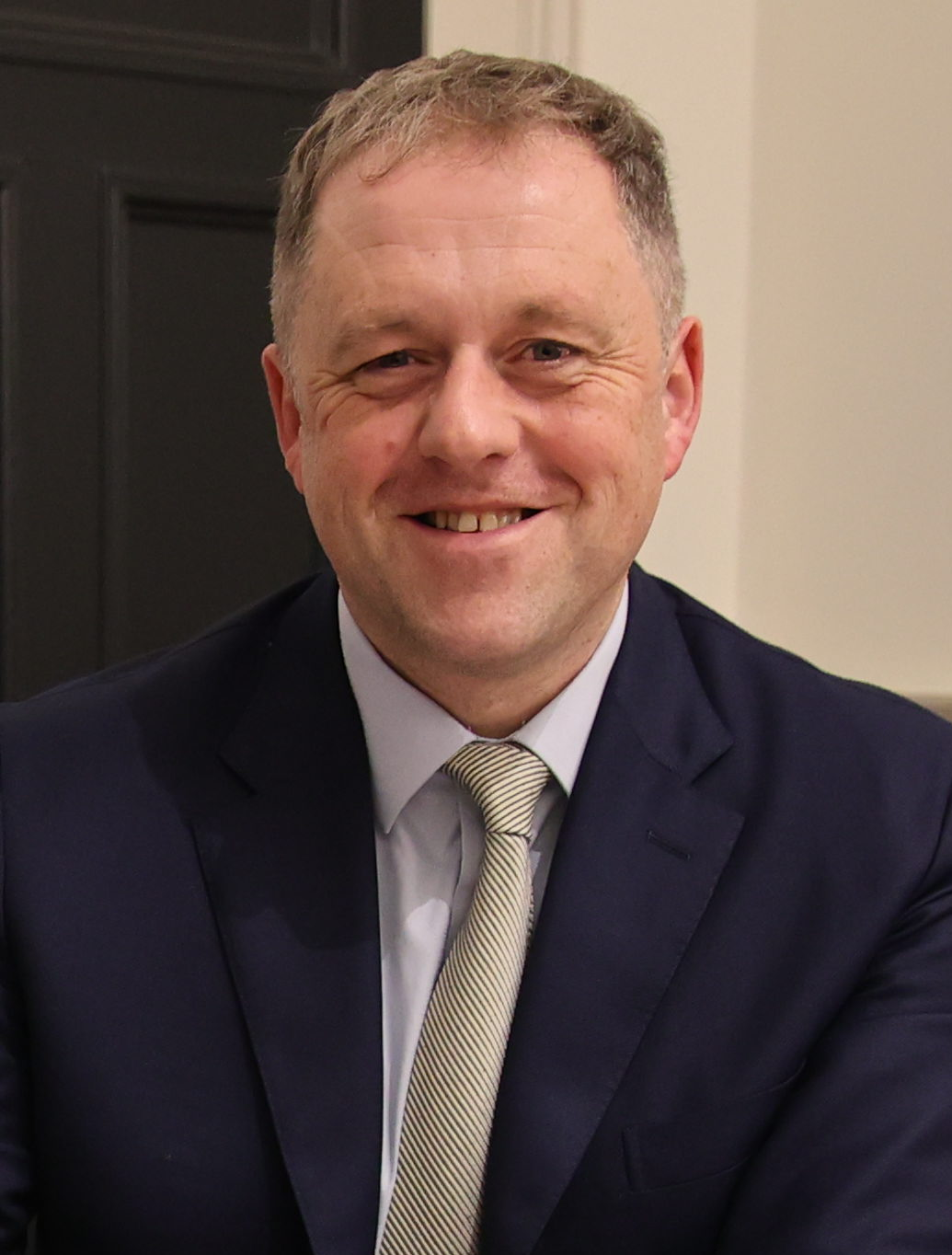
- Byrne in 2024

Minister of State
- 2025–: European Affairs
- 2025–: Taoiseach
- 2025–: Defence
- 2022–2025: Tourism, Culture, Arts, Gaeltacht, Sport and Media
- 2022–2025: Education
- 2020–2022: European Affairs

Teachta Dála
- Incumbent
- Assumed office February 2016
- In office May 2007 – February 2011
- Constituency: Meath East

Senator
- In office 25 May 2011 – 26 February 2016
- Constituency: Cultural and Educational Panel

Personal details
- Born: 1 June 1977 (age 49) Drogheda, County Louth, Ireland
- Party: Fianna Fáil
- Spouse: Ann Hunt (m. 2005)
- Children: 3
- Education: Trinity College Dublin

Thomas Byrne (born 1 June 1977) is an Irish Fianna Fáil politician and solicitor who has served as a Minister of State since July 2020. He has served as a Teachta Dála (TD) for Meath East from 2007 to 2011, and subsequently since 2016. From 2011 to 2016, he was a senator on the Cultural and Educational Panel.

== Early life ==
Born on 1 June 1977 in Our Lady of Lourdes Hospital, Drogheda, Byrne is the eldest of seven children. He is the son of Thomas Byrne Snr, a Drogheda borough councillor, auctioneer and player-manager of Drogheda United F.C. and Kathleen (née Hilliard) Byrne. Byrne's younger brother, James Byrne, is a Fianna Fáil member of Louth County Council.

Byrne was educated in Scoil Aonghusa national school and then Saint Mary's Diocesan School in Drogheda. Byrne attended university at Trinity College Dublin, where he gained a Bachelor of Laws degree. Following his graduation, Byrne enrolled in the Law Society of Ireland.

Byrne worked as a solicitor at Feran & Co. law firm in Drogheda until his selection as a Fianna Fáil 2007 Irish general election candidate for the newly established constituency of Meath East. In his first campaign for public office, Byrne was elected to the Dáil with 7,834 first preference votes, making him the youngest member of the Fianna Fáil parliamentary party at the time.

== Political career ==
=== 30th Dáil (2007–2011) ===
In 2007, following his election to Dáil Éireann, Taoiseach and Leader of Fianna Fáil Bertie Ahern appointed Byrne as the Government Convenor of the Oireachtas Joint Committee on Social Protection and as a member of the Joint Oireachtas Committees on Justice and Defence, European Affairs and Finance, respectively.

During this period, Byrne was selected as a Fianna Fáil parliamentary party delegate to the National Forum on Europe. Following the first unsuccessful referendum to ratify the Treaty of Lisbon, Byrne was appointed to an Oireachtas sub-committee tasked with reviewing the causes of the Lisbon Treaty's rejection by the Irish electorate in June 2008. The Treaty was subsequently adopted following a second plebiscite in October 2009.

While serving his first Dáil term, the issue of young couple mortgage arrears in Meath East was one of Byrne's primary focuses as he co-authored a bipartisan report which instituted revised code of conduct regulations for mortgage lenders operating in Ireland.

In June 2009, following selection to run alongside the existing Fianna Fáil MEP Liam Aylward, Byrne unsuccessfully contested the 2009 European Parliament election for the East constituency receiving a total of 33,383 votes.

In November 2009, Byrne was appointed president of Ógra Fianna Fáil by Taoiseach and leader of Fianna Fáil Brian Cowen at its national youth conference.

=== 24th Seanad (2011–2016) ===
Byrne lost his seat in the 2011 general election. He was elected as a Fianna Fáil senator for the Cultural and Educational Panel, and was appointed by then Leader of the Opposition Micheál Martin as Seanad Éireann opposition front bench spokesperson on Public Expenditure & Reform, and subsequently Health.

Byrne unsuccessfully contested the 2013 Meath East by-election, held following the death of Fine Gael TD Shane McEntee. Although Byrne received 8,002 first preference votes, he lost out to Fine Gael candidate Helen McEntee, daughter of Shane McEntee.

In May 2014, following selection to run alongside the sitting Fianna Fáil MEP Pat "the Cope" Gallagher, Byrne unsuccessfully contested the European Parliament election for the Midlands–North-West constituency receiving a total of 64,057 votes (8.6%).

=== 32nd Dáil (2016–2020) ===
Following the 2016 general election, Byrne was re-elected to Dáil Éireann, receiving a total of 10,818 first preference votes (26.1%). On returning to Dáil Éireann, Byrne was appointed opposition front bench spokesperson for Education and Skills by then Leader of the Opposition Micheál Martin.

As opposition spokesperson for Education and Skills, Byrne opposed so-called 'baptism barrier' which was instituted in oversubscribed Irish Catholic primary schools. The practice, in line with Catholic primary schools admissions policies at the time, involved the lawful discrimination of student registration on the basis of religion. Following a bipartisan initiative to remove the obstacle, led by Byrne and the Minister for Education and Skills Richard Bruton, the Education (Admission to Schools) Act 2018 was enacted, prohibited selective enrolment predicated on religious factors.

In November 2019, Byrne was appointed Director of Elections by Fianna Fáil leader Micheál Martin for the 2019 Dublin Fingal by-election, to fill the Dáil vacancy created by the election of former Independents 4 Change TD Clare Daly to the European Parliament. However, Fianna Fáil Senator Lorraine Clifford-Lee lost the election to Green Party candidate Joe O’Brien TD.

=== 33rd Dáil (2020–present) ===
In February 2020, Byrne was re-elected to Dáil Éireann as a TD for Meath East, receiving 6,039 first preference votes.

In May 2020, speaking as opposition spokesperson for Education and Skills, Byrne called on the Minister for Education and Skills Joe McHugh, to cancel the 2020 Leaving Certificate and implement "fair alternatives" to alleviate undue student stress and anxiety following months of national uncertainty caused by the COVID-19 pandemic. The call received widespread support and led to the adoption of a predicted grading system in place of the traditional Leaving Certificate for 2020.

Following the election, as no single party received a governing parliamentary majority, Fianna Fáil leader Micheál Martin assembled a six-person negotiating team, of which Byrne was a member, tasked with reaching out to like-minded political parties with the intent to form a government. After five months of discussion, held during the COVID-19 pandemic, Fianna Fáil, Fine Gael and the Green Party reached an unprecedented agreement to coalesce and establish a governing majority. Following the formation of the government of the 33rd Dáil, Byrne was appointed Minister of State for European Affairs by Taoiseach Micheál Martin.

In December 2022, following the appointment of Leo Varadkar as Taoiseach, he was appointed as Minister of State at the Department of Tourism, Culture, Arts, Gaeltacht, Sport and Media and Minister of State at the Department of Education with special responsibility for Sport and Physical Education.

On 10 April 2024, Byrne was given the Gaeltacht portfolio in addition to his existing Sport role at the Department of Tourism, Culture, Arts, Gaeltacht, Sport and Media, following the appointment of Simon Harris as Taoiseach.

On 29 January 2025, he was appointed as Minister of State at the Department of the Taoiseach, the Department of Foreign Affairs and Trade, and the Department of Defence.

== Personal life ==
In September 2005, Byrne married Ann Hunt, a clinical nurse manager and former Meath ladies' footballer. They live in Meath and have three children. He is fluent in Irish.

Political offices
Preceded by Helen McEntee	Minister of State for European Affairs; 2020–2022	Succeeded by Peter Burke
Preceded by Jack Chambers	Minister of State at the Department of Tourism, Culture, Arts, Gaeltacht, Sport and Media; 2022–2025	Succeeded by Charlie McConalogue
Preceded by Josepha Madigan	Minister of State at the Department of Education; 2022–2025; With: Josepha Madigan; 2022–2024	Succeeded by Michael Moynihan
Preceded by Jennifer Carroll MacNeill	Minister of State for European Affairs; 2025–present	Incumbent
Preceded by Jennifer Carroll MacNeill	Minister of State at the Department of Defence; 2025–present	Incumbent

Dáil	Election	Deputy (Party)	Deputy (Party)	Deputy (Party)	Deputy (Party)
30th	2007	Thomas Byrne (FF)	Mary Wallace (FF)	Shane McEntee (FG)	3 seats 2007–2024
31st	2011	Dominic Hannigan (Lab)	Regina Doherty (FG)	Shane McEntee (FG)	3 seats 2007–2024
31st	2013 by-election	Dominic Hannigan (Lab)	Regina Doherty (FG)	Helen McEntee (FG)	3 seats 2007–2024
32nd	2016	Thomas Byrne (FF)	Regina Doherty (FG)	Helen McEntee (FG)	3 seats 2007–2024
33rd	2020	Thomas Byrne (FF)	Darren O'Rourke (SF)	Helen McEntee (FG)	3 seats 2007–2024
34th	2024	Thomas Byrne (FF)	Darren O'Rourke (SF)	Helen McEntee (FG)	Gillian Toole (Ind.)
