= Minister of State for European Affairs =

List of Irish Ministers of State for European Affairs

The minister of state for European affairs is a junior ministerial post at the Department of the Taoiseach and the Department of Foreign Affairs and Trade of the Government of Ireland with special responsibility for European Affairs. The minister works with the Taoiseach and the minister for foreign affairs and trade. The minister of state does not hold cabinet rank.

The current officeholder is Thomas Byrne, TD, who was appointed in January 2025.

== List of ministers of state ==
Name	Term of office		Party	Government
George Birmingham	13 February 1986	10 March 1987	Fine Gael	19th
Máire Geoghegan-Quinn	12 March 1987	15 November 1991	Fianna Fáil	20th • 21st
Michael P. Kitt	15 November 1991	11 February 1992	Fianna Fáil	22nd
Tom Kitt	13 February 1992	15 December 1994	Fianna Fáil	23rd
Gay Mitchell	20 December 1994	26 June 1997	Fine Gael	24th
Dick Roche	19 June 2002	29 September 2004	Fianna Fáil	26th
Noel Treacy	29 September 2004	20 June 2007	Fianna Fáil	26th
Dick Roche	20 June 2007	9 March 2011	Fianna Fáil	27th • 28th
Lucinda Creighton	10 March 2011	11 July 2013	Fine Gael	29th
Paschal Donohoe	12 July 2013	11 July 2014	Fine Gael	29th
Dara Murphy	15 July 2014	20 June 2017	Fine Gael	29th • 30th
Helen McEntee	20 June 2017	27 June 2020	Fine Gael	31st
Thomas Byrne	1 July 2020	17 December 2022	Fianna Fáil	32nd
Peter Burke	21 December 2022	9 April 2024	Fine Gael	33rd
Jennifer Carroll MacNeill	9 April 2024	23 January 2025	Fine Gael	34th
Thomas Byrne	29 January 2025	Incumbent	Fianna Fáil	35th

== See also ==
- Minister for European Affairs – a similar position in other governments.
