= Rodolphus Allen Family Private Trust =

Pseudolegal scam

The Rodolphus Allen Family Private Trust was a group, purporting to be a property trust, operating in Ireland. While supporters of the group's methods stated that it could exploit loopholes in mortgage documents to prevent the takeover of at-risk properties from bank repossession, a number of politicians, financial advisors and legal commentators warned that the group's purpose was to scam investors and embezzle funds while claiming to place the property into a non-existent 'trust'. The group was set up by Charles Allen, a Kilkenny based landscape gardener. Other people, associated with the group's activities, included Ben Gilroy and Catriona Carey.

The group was neither registered as a company nor as a charity in the Republic of Ireland or in any way registered with any financial regulatory body. Its operations were labelled as "legal nonsense" in the High Court, as a "massive fraud and a scam" in Dáil Éireann, as having the "hallmarks of scam" by a senator in Seanad Éireann, and as "predatory behaviour on vulnerable debtors" by the Irish Mortgage Holders Organisation.

== History ==
The first mention of the 'trust' in the media was in July 2013 when the Irish Examiner reported that a number of indebted individuals had been pledging certain assets to this trust. The group appears to have been set up by the Kilkenny-based landscape gardener Charles Allen.

The group became the subject of further headlines during the repossession of Kennycourt Stud Farm in Brannockstown, County Kildare, Ireland. The farm was due to be sold by Irish Bank Resolution Corporation, after its owner's inability to pay an outstanding loan of €814,000. A member/supporter of the group stated that the "owner", Eugene McDermott, had signed over his property to the trust and was now a "tenant" of the trust.

In early September 2013, a notary public, previously employed by the group, ceased offering notarising services to the group.

By late September 2013, High Court judge Sean Ryan had issued a warrant for the arrest of Charles Allen for "contempt of court orders". Allen was later arrested, and subsequently released after giving an undertaking "not to interfere with or trespass on" specific lands in County Kildare which were subject to receivership. A similar bench warrant was issued for the arrest of Ben Gilroy. Gilroy was given a suspended sentence after being found in contempt.

As of late 2013, the Revenue Commissioners were reportedly "examining the operations" of the group, and a member of Seanad Éireann had reported it to the Gardaí.

As of 2015, the Irish Mortgage Holders Organisation were continuing to warn mortgage holders of "predatory behaviour" by the organisation, while Allen reportedly could "not give any case numbers" for any repossession cases reputedly won by the group.

Catriona Carey, who was convicted of tax offences in 2008, of theft and fraud in 2020 and later charged with breaches of company law and money laundering, was reportedly previously associated with the Rodolphus Allen Family Trust organisation.

== Legal status ==
The legal status of the group has been called into question by a number of legal experts, financial advisers and politicians, being associated by some with "freeman on the land" ideologies.

Karl Deeter, a financial analyst with Irish Mortgage Brokers and Advisors, after attending a presentation given by the group on 9 August 2013, said that he would be advising his clients to avoid the group. He stated: "the big concern, and the first thing on my list is that they won't disclose how it works - the bit where the banks can't go after you and they 'remove the debt'". He also criticised the lack of legal training of the individuals giving the presentation. In another article, entitled "Let the Bullshit Begin: The Document behind the Kilkenny trust", Deeter examined a trust document used by the group, dismissing it as a "copy and paste job", noting the "lack of reference to any particular law (many documents with a legal foundation state the referenced legislation on them), and diminished powers of the trustee".

Bill Holohan, a solicitor, stated the trust was "unlikely to work" in preventing repossession, claiming the trust document to be a "glorious mix of some American-style language, with some European-style language. To be honest, it smacks of a cut-and-paste job from a combination of sources". There was no mention of how to take property out of the trust in the document.

A 2013 article in The Irish Examiner stated that "despite its growing popularity, there is no general understanding of how the trust can trump commitments borrowers have made in their loan agreements".

A 2018 paper, published by the Center for Expertise and Training on Religious Fundamentalism and Radicalization in Canada, described the organisation as a "pseudolaw-based entity" that advocated pseudolegal concepts such as the "strawman theory".

== See also ==
- Direct Democracy Ireland
