= Government of the 33rd Dáil =

Government of Ireland 2020 to 2025

There were three governments of the 33rd Dáil, being coalition governments of Fianna Fáil, Fine Gael and the Green Party. This followed the 2020 general election to Dáil Éireann held on 8 February, and negotiations on a programme for government that lasted till June. The parties agreed on a rotation, with the two major party leaders alternating as Taoiseach. The makeup of the parties resulted in a centre-right coalition. It was the first time that Fianna Fáil and Fine Gael have participated in the same government, which Leo Varadkar described as the end of what has often been referred to as Civil War politics.

The 32nd government of Ireland (27 June 2020 to 17 December 2022) was led by Micheál Martin, leader of Fianna Fáil, as Taoiseach, and Leo Varadkar, leader of Fine Gael, as Tánaiste. It was in office for 2 years, 175 days and ended as planned with the rotation of the office of Taoiseach.

The 33rd government of Ireland (17 December 2022 to 9 April 2024) was led by Varadkar as Taoiseach and Martin as Tánaiste. It lasted 1 year, 114 days. Varadkar resigned as leader of Fine Gael on 20 March 2024 and was succeeded on 24 March by Simon Harris. Varadkar resigned as Taoiseach on 8 April.

The 34th government of Ireland (9 April 2024 to 23 January 2025) was led by Simon Harris as Taoiseach and Martin as Tánaiste. It lasted 289 days. Harris resigned as Taoiseach on 18 December 2024 on the morning of the first meeting of the 34th Dáil after the 2024 general election. Harris and the other members of the government continued to carry out their duties until the appointment of their successors on 23 January 2025.

== 32nd government of Ireland ==
32nd government of Ireland
- Government of Ireland

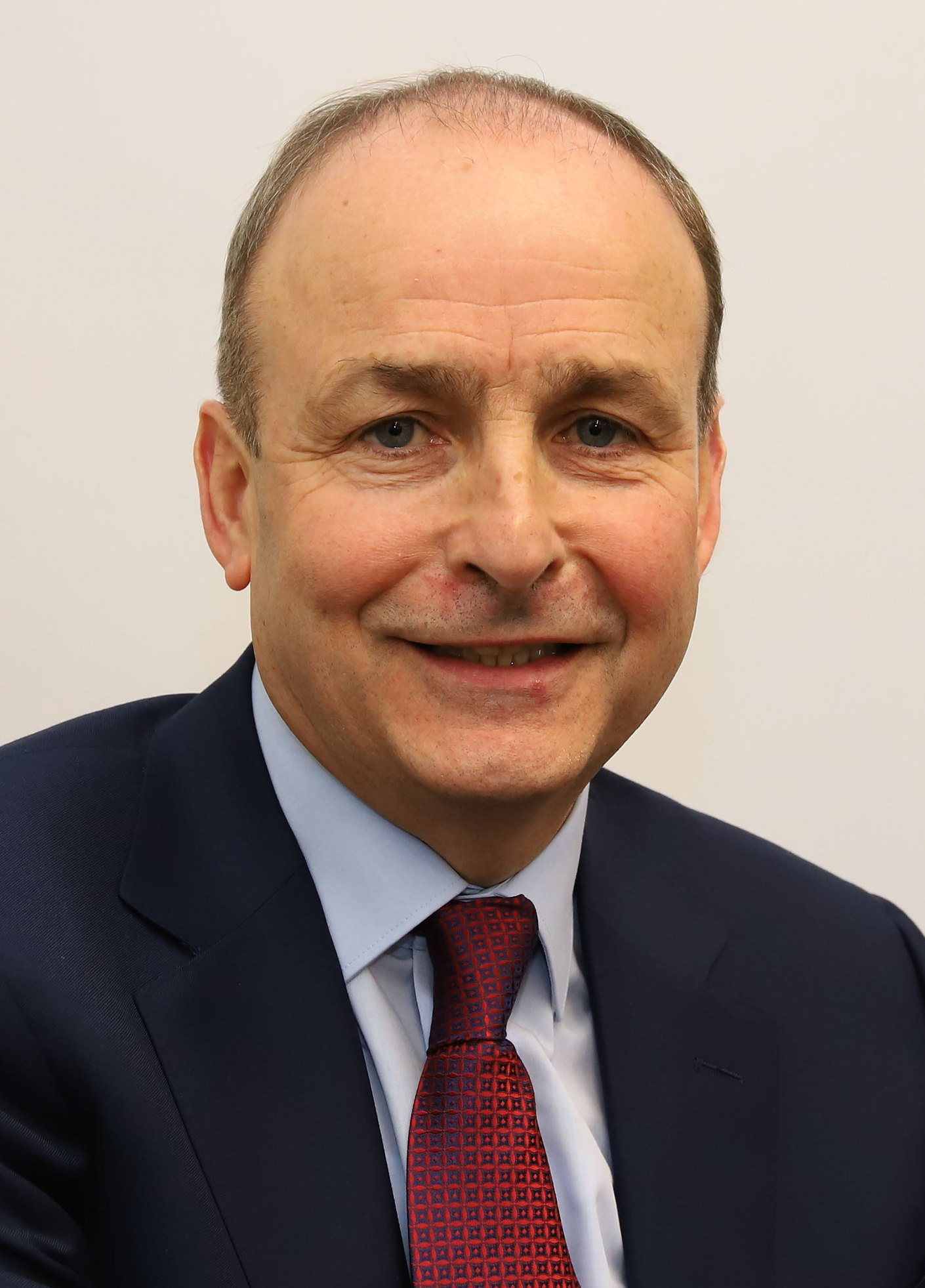
- Date formed: 27 June 2020
- Date dissolved: 17 December 2022

People and organisations
- President: Michael D. Higgins
- Taoiseach: Micheál Martin
- Tánaiste: Leo Varadkar
- No. of ministers: 15
- Member parties: Fianna Fáil; Fine Gael; Green Party
- Status in legislature: Majority (coalition)
- Opposition cabinet: Second McDonald front bench
- Opposition party: Sinn Féin
- Opposition leader: Mary Lou McDonald

History
- Incoming formation: 2020 government formation
- Election: 2020 general election
- Legislature terms: 33rd Dáil; 26th Seanad
- Budgets: 2021; 2022; 2023
- Predecessor: 31st government
- Successor: 33rd government

=== Nomination of Taoiseach ===
The 33rd Dáil first met on 20 February 2020. Leo Varadkar, Taoiseach and Fine Gael leader, Micheál Martin, Fianna Fáil leader, Mary Lou McDonald, Sinn Féin leader, and Eamon Ryan, Green Party leader, were each proposed for nomination as Taoiseach. None of the four motions were successful. Varadkar announced that he would resign as Taoiseach but that under the provisions of Article 28.11 of the Constitution, the members of the government would continue to carry out their duties until their successors were appointed.

On 27 June, the Dáil again debated nominations for the position of Taoiseach. The nomination of Martin was approved by the Dáil. Martin was then appointed as Taoiseach by President Michael D. Higgins.

27 June 2020; Nomination of Micheál Martin (FF) as Taoiseach; Motion proposed by Norma Foley and seconded by James O'Connor; Absolute majority: 81/160
Vote	Parties	Votes
Yes	Fianna Fáil (37), Fine Gael (35), Green Party (12), Independents (9)	93 / 160
No	Sinn Féin (37), Independents (7), Labour Party (6), Social Democrats (6), Solidarity–People Before Profit (5), Aontú (1), Right to Change (1)	63 / 160
Abstain	Independents (3)	3 / 160
Not voting	Ceann Comhairle (1)	1 / 160

=== Government ministers ===
After his appointment as Taoiseach by the president, Micheál Martin proposed the members of the government and they were approved by the Dáil. They were appointed by the president on the same day.

Office	Name	Term	Party
Taoiseach	Micheál Martin (Note: Martin served as Minister for Agriculture, Food and the Marine between the sacking of Cowen on 14 July 2020 and the appointment of Calleary to government on 15 July 2020. He served again from 21 August to 2 September 2020 after the resignation of Calleary.)	2020–2022	Fianna Fáil
Tánaiste	Leo Varadkar	2020–2022	Fine Gael
Minister for Enterprise, Trade and Employment (Note: The Department of Business, Enterprise and Innovation was renamed the Department of Enterprise, Trade and Employment on 10 November 2020.)	Leo Varadkar	2020–2022	Fine Gael
Minister for the Environment, Climate and Communications (Note: The Department of Communications, Climate Action and Environment was renamed the Department of the Environment, Climate and Communications on 24 September 2020.)	Eamon Ryan	2020–2022	Green
Minister for Transport (Note: The Department of Transport, Tourism and Sport was renamed the Department of Transport on 17 September 2020.)	Eamon Ryan	2020–2022	Green
Minister for Tourism, Culture, Arts, Gaeltacht, Sport and Media (Note: The Department of Culture, Heritage and the Gaeltacht was renamed the Department of Tourism, Culture, Arts, Gaeltacht, Sport and Media on 30 September 2020.)	Catherine Martin	2020–2022	Green
Minister for Children, Equality, Disability, Integration and Youth (Note: The Department of Children and Youth Affairs was renamed the Department of Children, Equality, Disability, Integration and Youth on 15 October 2020.)	Roderic O'Gorman	2020–2022	Green
Minister for Finance	Paschal Donohoe	2020–2022	Fine Gael
Minister for Foreign Affairs (Note: The Department of Foreign Affairs and Trade was renamed the Department of Foreign Affairs on 24 September 2020.)	Simon Coveney	2020–2022	Fine Gael
Minister for Defence	Simon Coveney	2020–2022	Fine Gael
Minister for Justice (Note: The Department of Justice and Equality was renamed the Department of Justice on 1 November 2020.)	Helen McEntee	2020–2022	Fine Gael
Minister for Further and Higher Education, Research, Innovation and Science (Note: The Department of Further and Higher Education, Research, Innovation and Science was established on 2 August 2020. Harris was a minister without portfolio until that date.)	Simon Harris	2020–2022	Fine Gael
Minister for Rural and Community Development	Heather Humphreys	2020–2022	Fine Gael
Minister for Social Protection (Note: The Department of Employment Affairs and Social Protection was renamed the Department of Social Protection on 21 October 2020.)	Heather Humphreys	2020–2022	Fine Gael
Minister for Education (Note: The Department of Education and Skills was renamed the Department of Education on 22 October 2020.)	Norma Foley	2020–2022	Fianna Fáil
Minister for Housing, Local Government and Heritage (Note: The Department of Housing, Planning and Local Government was renamed the Department of Housing, Local Government and Heritage on 30 September 2020.)	Darragh O'Brien	2020–2022	Fianna Fáil
Minister for Agriculture, Food and the Marine	Barry Cowen	2020	Fianna Fáil
Minister for Public Expenditure and Reform	Michael McGrath	2020–2022	Fianna Fáil
Minister for Health	Stephen Donnelly	2020–2022	Fianna Fáil
==== Changes 15 July 2020 ==== Following the sacking of Barry Cowen on 14 July 2020.
Office	Name	Term	Party
Minister for Agriculture, Food and the Marine	Dara Calleary	2020	Fianna Fáil
==== Changes 2 September 2020 ==== Following the resignation of Dara Calleary on 21 August 2020.
Office	Name	Term	Party
Minister for Agriculture, Food and the Marine	Charlie McConalogue	2020–2022	Fianna Fáil
==== Change 27 April 2021 ==== Temporary appointment during first maternity leave of Helen McEntee.
Office	Name	Term	Party
Minister for Justice	Heather Humphreys	Apr. to Nov. 2021	Fine Gael
Minister without portfolio	Helen McEntee	Apr. to Nov. 2021	Fine Gael
==== Change 1 November 2021 ==== Return of Helen McEntee from first maternity leave
Office	Name	Term	Party
Minister for Justice	Helen McEntee	2021–2022	Fine Gael
==== Change 25 November 2022 ==== Temporary appointment during the second maternity leave of Helen McEntee
Office	Name	Term	Party
Minister for Justice	Heather Humphreys	Nov.–Dec. 2022	Fine Gael
Minister without portfolio	Helen McEntee	Nov.–Dec. 2022	Fine Gael

=== Attorney General ===
Paul Gallagher SC was appointed by the president as Attorney General on the nomination of the Taoiseach, a role he had previously served in from 2007 to 2011.

=== Ministers of state ===
On 27 June 2020, the government on the nomination of the Taoiseach appointed Dara Calleary, TD, Hildegarde Naughton, TD, and Sen. Pippa Hackett as ministers of state attending at cabinet without a vote. Pippa Hackett is the first senator to have been appointed as a Minister of State. On 1 July, the government appointed seventeen further ministers of state on the nomination of the Taoiseach.

Name	Department(s)	Responsibility	Party
Dara Calleary (In attendance at cabinet)	Taoiseach; Culture, Heritage and the Gaeltacht; Transport, Tourism and Sport	Government Chief Whip; Gaeltacht and Sport	Fianna Fáil
Hildegarde Naughton (In attendance at cabinet)	Transport; Environment, Climate and Communications	International and Road Transport and Logistics, Postal Policy and Eircodes	Fine Gael
Pippa Hackett (In attendance at cabinet)	Agriculture, Food and the Marine	Land Use and Biodiversity	Green
Thomas Byrne	Taoiseach; Foreign Affairs	European Affairs	Fianna Fáil
Patrick O'Donovan	Public Expenditure and Reform	Office of Public Works	Fine Gael
Ossian Smyth	Public Expenditure and Reform; Environment, Climate and Communications	Public Procurement and eGovernment; Communications and the Circular Economy	Green
Jack Chambers	Finance	Financial Services, Credit Unions and Insurance	Fianna Fáil
Josepha Madigan	Education	Special Education and Inclusion	Fine Gael
Martin Heydon	Agriculture, Food and the Marine	Research & Development, Farm Safety and New Market Development	Fine Gael
Anne Rabbitte	Children, Equality, Disability, Integration and Youth; Health	Disability	Fianna Fáil
Colm Brophy	Foreign Affairs	Overseas Development Aid and Diaspora	Fine Gael
Charlie McConalogue	Justice	Law Reform	Fianna Fáil
Niall Collins	Further and Higher Education, Research, Innovation and Science	Skills and Further Education	Fianna Fáil
Joe O'Brien	Rural and Community Development; Social Protection	Community Development and Charities	Green
Peter Burke	Housing, Local Government and Heritage	Local Government and Planning	Fine Gael
Malcolm Noonan	Housing, Local Government and Heritage	Nature, Heritage and Electoral Reform	Green
Robert Troy	Enterprise, Trade and Employment	Trade Promotion	Fianna Fáil
Damien English	Enterprise, Trade and Employment; Social Protection	Employment Affairs and Retail Businesses	Fine Gael
Mary Butler	Health	Mental Health and Older People	Fianna Fáil
Frank Feighan	Health	Public Health, Well Being and National Drugs Strategy	Fine Gael
==== Changes 15 July 2020 ==== Following the appointment of Dara Calleary to government.
Name	Department(s)	Responsibility	Party
Jack Chambers (In attendance at cabinet)	Taoiseach; Tourism, Culture, Arts, Gaeltacht, Sport and Media	Government Chief Whip; Gaeltacht and Sport	Fianna Fáil
Seán Fleming	Finance	Financial Services, Credit Unions and Insurance	Fianna Fáil
==== Changes 2 September 2020 ==== Following the appointment of Charlie McConalogue to government.
Name	Department(s)	Responsibility	Party
James Browne	Justice	Law Reform	Fianna Fáil
==== Change 17 November 2020 ==== Additional assignment.
Name	Department(s)	Responsibility	Party
Jack Chambers (In attendance at cabinet)	Defence	Defence	Fianna Fáil
==== Change 27 April 2021 ==== Additional assignments during the maternity leave of Helen McEntee, expired on 1 November 2021.
Name	Department(s)	Responsibility	Party
Hildegarde Naughton (In attendance at cabinet)	Justice	Criminal justice	Fine Gael
James Browne	Justice	Civil justice and immigration	Fianna Fáil
==== Change 31 August 2022 ==== Following the resignation of Robert Troy on 24 August 2022.
Name	Department(s)	Responsibility	Party
Dara Calleary	Enterprise, Trade and Employment	Trade Promotion, Digital and Company Regulation	Fianna Fáil

=== Events affecting the government ===
Minister for Agriculture, Food and the Marine Barry Cowen was sacked on 14 July 2020 because of driving offences which he had committed but not disclosed to Micheál Martin prior to his appointment to cabinet. He was replaced by Dara Calleary.

Legislation was passed to allow each of three Ministers of State who attend cabinet meetings to receive an allowance, as previous legislation had provided an allowance for two only. After public dissatisfaction with the proposal, the three ministers of state agreed on 28 July 2020 to share the existing allowance between them, rather than accept the increase.

Minister for Agriculture, Food and the Marine Dara Calleary resigned on 21 August 2020 after the fallout from the Oireachtas Golf Society scandal. Phil Hogan resigned as European Commissioner for Trade on 26 August 2020 in response to the same events.

In October 2020, Village magazine published a claim that Leo Varadkar had provided a copy of a confidential document to the head of the National Association of General Practitioners that had been part of negotiations with the Irish Medical Organisation in April 2019 while Taoiseach. Fine Gael issued a statement which described the article as "both inaccurate and grossly defamatory", and while accepting that the provision of the agreement by private channels was "not best practice", said there was nothing unlawful about what had occurred. Sinn Féin tabled a motion of no confidence in the Tánaiste. In response, the Taoiseach moved a motion of confidence.

At a cabinet meeting in July 2021, Minister for Foreign Affairs Simon Coveney announced the appointment of Katherine Zappone, former Minister for Children and Youth Affairs, to the newly created position of Special Envoy to the UN for Freedom of Opinion and Expression. It emerged that the proposed appointment had not been flagged by Coveney with the Taoiseach in advance of the meeting. Zappone declined the appointment after the Merrion Hotel controversy arose, in which the Irish Independent reported that six days prior to the announcement of her appointment, Zappone had hosted a gathering for 50 guests, including Tánaiste Leo Varadkar, at the Merrion Hotel while the COVID-19 pandemic was ongoing. Comparisons were made between the gathering and the Golfgate scandal earlier in the pandemic. Sinn Féin tabled a motion of no confidence in Coveney, to be debated on 15 September on the return of the Dáil from the summer recess. In response, the Taoiseach moved a motion of confidence.

On 6 July 2022, the government lost its majority after Fine Gael TD Joe McHugh voted against legislation underpinning a €2.7 billion mica redress scheme and subsequently resigned the Fine Gael party whip. Sinn Féin tabled a motion of no confidence in the government, to be debated on 12 July before the summer recess. In response, the Taoiseach moved a motion of confidence.

On 24 August 2022, Robert Troy resigned as Minister of State at the Department of Enterprise, Trade and Employment after his failure to declare property interest was revealed by The Ditch. He was succeeded by former Minister for Agriculture Dara Calleary.

In December 2022, People Before Profit–Solidarity tabled a motion of no confidence in Minister for Housing Darragh O'Brien, to be debated on 13 December, four days before a new government was formed. The group claimed the worsening housing and homelessness crisis under O'Brien was "tearing apart the social fabric of Irish society and leading to the scapegoating of refugees". In response, the Taoiseach moved a motion of confidence.

=== Budgets ===
The Minister for Finance, Paschal Donohoe, and Minister for Public Expenditure and Reform, Michael McGrath, delivered the following budgets:

- 2021 budget, delivered on 13 October 2020
- 2022 budget, delivered on 12 October 2021
- 2023 budget, delivered on 27 September 2022

=== Motions of confidence ===
On 10 November 2020, a motion of confidence in the Tánaiste and Minister for Enterprise, Trade and Employment, Leo Varadkar, proposed by Taoiseach Micheál Martin, was approved with 92 votes in favour to 65 against.

On 15 September 2021, a motion of confidence in the Minister for Foreign Affairs and Defence, Simon Coveney, proposed by Taoiseach Micheál Martin, was approved with 92 votes in favour to 59 against.

On 12 July 2022, a motion of confidence in the government, proposed by Taoiseach Micheál Martin, was approved with 85 votes in favour to 66 against, with one abstention.

On 13 December 2022, a motion of confidence in the Minister for Housing, Local Government and Heritage, Darragh O'Brien, proposed by Taoiseach Micheál Martin, was approved with 86 votes in favour to 63 against, with one abstention.

=== Resignation ===
Micheál Martin resigned as Taoiseach on Saturday 17 December 2022 to allow the appointment of Leo Varadkar as Taoiseach and the formation of a new government, a continuation of the coalition agreement between Fianna Fáil, Fine Gael and the Green Party. The date agreed in the Programme for Government had been Thursday 15 December, but this date was put back to facilitate Martin's attendance at a meeting of the European Council.

== 33rd government of Ireland ==
33rd government of Ireland
- Government of Ireland

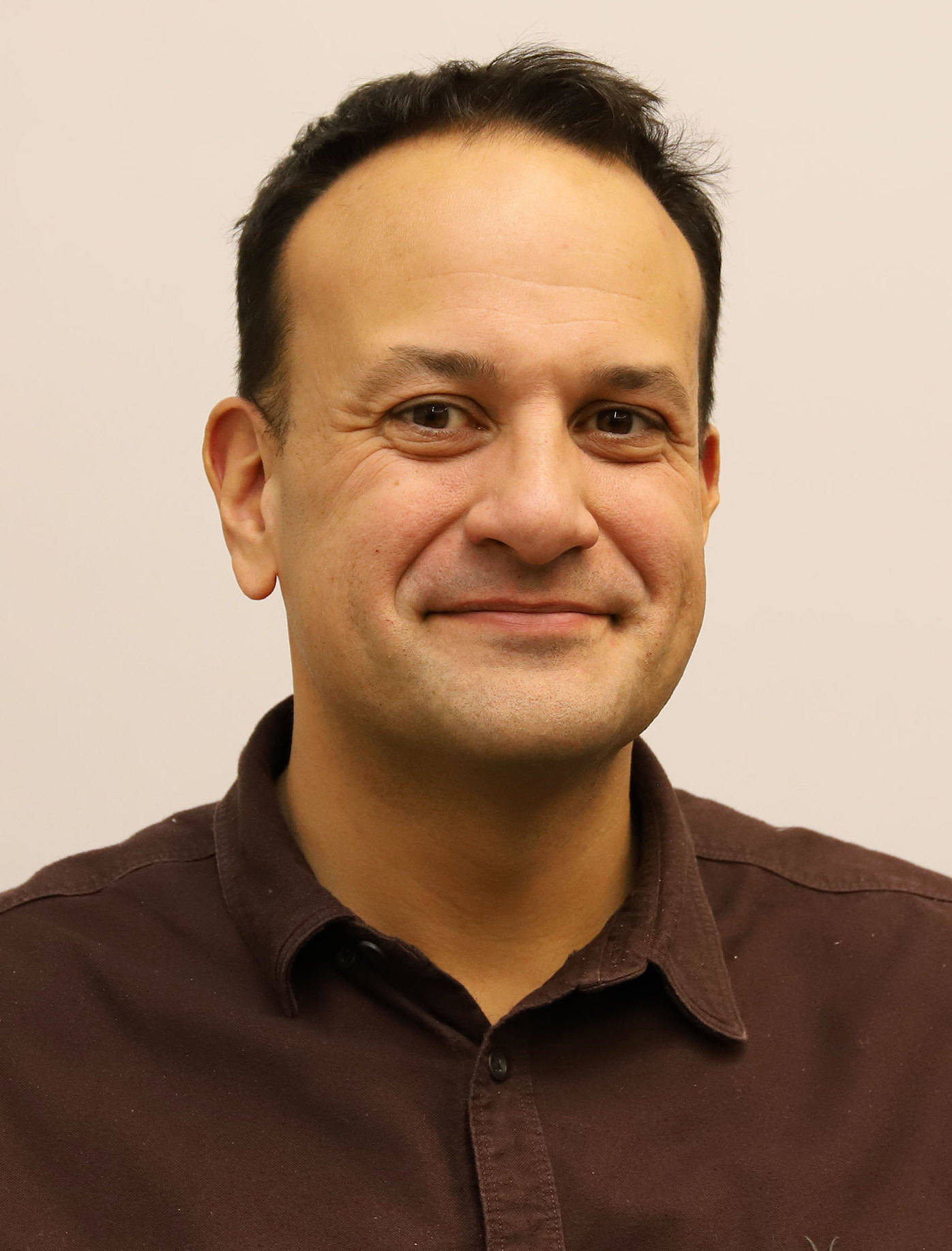
- Date formed: 17 December 2022
- Date dissolved: 9 April 2024

People and organisations
- President: Michael D. Higgins
- Taoiseach: Leo Varadkar
- Tánaiste: Micheál Martin
- No. of ministers: 15
- Member parties: Fine Gael; Fianna Fáil; Green Party
- Status in legislature: Majority (coalition)
- Opposition cabinet: McDonald front bench
- Opposition party: Sinn Féin
- Opposition leader: Mary Lou McDonald

History
- Incoming formation: 2020 government formation
- Election: 2020 general election
- Legislature terms: 33rd Dáil; 26th Seanad
- Budget: 2024
- Predecessor: 32nd government
- Successor: 34th government

=== Nomination of Taoiseach ===
After the resignation of Micheál Martin as Taoiseach on 17 December 2022, Leo Varadkar was proposed for the nomination of the Dáil for the position of Taoiseach. This motion was approved and Varadkar was appointed by President Michael D. Higgins.

17 December 2022; Nomination of Leo Varadkar (FG) as Taoiseach; Motion proposed by Richard Bruton and seconded by Emer Higgins; Absolute majority: 81/160
Vote	Parties	Votes
Yes	Fianna Fáil (36), Fine Gael (32), Green Party (12), Independents (7)	87 / 160
No	Sinn Féin (36), Labour Party (7), Social Democrats (5), People Before Profit–Solidarity (5), Aontú (1), Right to Change (1), Independents (7)	62 / 160
Abstain	Independent (1)	1 / 160
Absent or Not voting	Ceann Comhairle, Leas-Cheann Comhairle, (Note: Catherine Connolly was presiding at time of the vote.) Fine Gael (1), Social Democrats (1), (Note: Helen McEntee and Holly Cairns had a pairing agreement for the duration of McEntee's maternity leave.) Independents (6)	10 / 160

=== Government ministers ===
After his appointment as Taoiseach by the president, Leo Varadkar proposed the members of the government and they were approved by the Dáil. They were appointed by the president on the same day.

Office	Name	Term	Party
Taoiseach	Leo Varadkar	2022–2024	Fine Gael
Tánaiste	Micheál Martin	2022–2024	Fianna Fáil
Minister for Foreign Affairs	Micheál Martin	2022–2024	Fianna Fáil
Minister for Defence	Micheál Martin	2022–2024	Fianna Fáil
Minister for the Environment, Climate and Communications	Eamon Ryan	2022–2024	Green
Minister for Transport	Eamon Ryan	2022–2024	Green
Minister for Finance	Michael McGrath	2022–2024	Fianna Fáil
Minister for Public Expenditure, National Development Plan Delivery and Reform (Note: The Department of Public Expenditure and Reform was renamed the Department of Public Expenditure, Infrastructure, Public Service Reform and Digitalisation on 1 February 2023.)	Paschal Donohoe	2022–2024	Fine Gael
Minister for Enterprise, Trade and Employment	Simon Coveney	2022–2024	Fine Gael
Minister for Education	Norma Foley	2022–2024	Fianna Fáil
Minister for Tourism, Culture, Arts, Gaeltacht, Sport and Media	Catherine Martin	2022–2024	Green
Minister for Housing, Local Government and Heritage	Darragh O'Brien	2022–2024	Fianna Fáil
Minister for Social Protection	Heather Humphreys	2022–2024	Fine Gael
Minister for Rural and Community Development	Heather Humphreys	2022–2024	Fine Gael
Minister for Agriculture, Food and the Marine	Charlie McConalogue	2022–2024	Fianna Fáil
Minister for Children, Equality, Disability, Integration and Youth	Roderic O'Gorman	2022–2024	Green
Minister for Health	Stephen Donnelly	2022–2024	Fianna Fáil
Minister for Further and Higher Education, Research, Innovation and Science	Simon Harris	2022–2024	Fine Gael
Minister for Justice (Note: Harris served as Minister for Justice from December 2022 to June 2023 during the maternity leave of Helen McEntee.)	Simon Harris	2022–2023	Fine Gael
Minister without portfolio	Helen McEntee (Note: McEntee was a minister without portfolio during her maternity leave.)	2022–2023	Fine Gael
==== Change 1 June 2023 ==== Return of Helen McEntee from maternity leave
Office	Name	Term	Party
Minister for Justice	Helen McEntee	2023–2024	Fine Gael

=== Attorney General ===
Rossa Fanning SC was appointed by the president as Attorney General on the nomination of the Taoiseach.

=== Ministers of state ===
On 17 December 2022, the government on the nomination of the Taoiseach appointed Hildegarde Naughton, TD, Jack Chambers, TD, and Sen. Pippa Hackett as ministers of state attending at cabinet without a vote. On 21 December, the government appointed seventeen further ministers of state on the nomination of the Taoiseach.

Name	Department(s)	Responsibility	Party
Hildegarde Naughton (In attendance at cabinet)	Taoiseach; Health	Government Chief Whip; Public Health, Wellbeing and the National Drugs Strategy	Fine Gael
Jack Chambers (In attendance at cabinet)	Transport; Environment, Climate and Communications	International and Road Transport and Logistics; Postal Policy	Fianna Fáil
Pippa Hackett (In attendance at cabinet)	Agriculture, Food and the Marine	Land Use and Biodiversity	Green
Peter Burke	Taoiseach; Foreign Affairs; Defence	European Affairs	Fine Gael
Patrick O'Donovan	Public Expenditure, National Development Plan Delivery and Reform; Tourism, Culture, Arts, Gaeltacht, Sport and Media	Office of Public Works; Gaeltacht	Fine Gael
Ossian Smyth	Public Expenditure, National Development Plan Delivery and Reform; Environment, Climate and Communications	Public Procurement and eGovernment; Communications and the Circular Economy	Green
Jennifer Carroll MacNeill	Finance	Financial Services, Credit Unions and Insurance	Fine Gael
Josepha Madigan	Education	Special Education and Inclusion	Fine Gael
Martin Heydon	Agriculture, Food and the Marine	Research & Development, Farm Safety and New Market Development	Fine Gael
Anne Rabbitte	Children, Equality, Disability, Integration and Youth; Health	Disability	Fianna Fáil
Seán Fleming	Foreign Affairs	International Development and Diaspora	Fianna Fáil
James Browne	Justice	Law Reform and Youth Justice	Fianna Fáil
Niall Collins	Further and Higher Education, Research, Innovation and Science	Skills and Further Education	Fianna Fáil
Joe O'Brien	Rural and Community Development; Social Protection; Children, Equality, Disability, Integration and Youth	Community Development and Charities; Integration	Green
Kieran O'Donnell	Housing, Local Government and Heritage	Local Government and Planning	Fine Gael
Malcolm Noonan	Housing, Local Government and Heritage	Heritage and Electoral Reform	Green
Dara Calleary	Enterprise, Trade and Employment	Trade Promotion and Digital Transformation	Fianna Fáil
Damien English	Enterprise, Trade and Employment; Social Protection	Employment Affairs and Retail Business	Fine Gael
Mary Butler	Health	Mental Health and Older People	Fianna Fáil
Thomas Byrne	Tourism, Culture, Arts, Gaeltacht, Sport and Media; Education	Sport and Physical Education	Fianna Fáil
==== Change 13 January 2023 ==== Following the resignation of Damien English on 12 January 2023.
Name	Department(s)	Responsibility	Party
Neale Richmond	Enterprise, Trade and Employment; Social Protection	Employment Affairs and Retail Business	Fine Gael
==== Change 22 March 2024 ==== Resignation of Josepha Madigan.

=== Events affecting the government ===
A month after the government was formed, in January 2023, news website The Ditch published a story claiming Minister of State for Employment Affairs and Retail Business Damien English failed to declare ownership of an existing home in his planning application for a new property in 2008. It also claimed he neglected to declare such ownership in the Dáil register of interests. He resigned as Minister of State on 12 January 2023. He was succeeded by Neale Richmond.

Also in January, the Sunday Independent revealed that Minister for Public Expenditure, National Development Plan Delivery and Reform Paschal Donohoe failed to properly declare a donation from a company in 2016. The Standards in Public Office Commission (SIPO) made a complaint against Donohoe that the Designer Group engineering firm used two company vans and six employees to erect and later remove election posters for Donohoe in his Dublin Central constituency during the 2016 general election campaign. On 14 January, Donohoe began conducting a review of his election expenses statements amid the allegations which he had denied. The next day, on 15 January, he apologised for making incorrect declarations of election expenses and donations during his campaign and said he would recuse himself from any decision making around ethics legislation while the SIPO investigated him, but refused to resign as minister. The controversy intensified on 20 January when Donohoe identified a new issue over expenses from the 2020 general election.

In March 2023, the government ended a ban on evictions, with effect from 31 March. Sinn Féin tabled a motion calling on the government to extend the ban until the end of January 2024. A government amendment to this motion was carried by a vote of 83 to 68. In a series of votes, Green Party TD Neasa Hourigan broke with the government whip, leading to her suspension from the parliamentary party. The Labour Party tabled a motion of no confidence in the government.

On 23 November 2023, a riot broke out in Dublin following an attack on three children and a care assistant by a male immigrant of Algerian origin. Following the riot, opposition politicians called for the resignations of the Minister for Justice Helen McEntee and the Garda Commissioner Drew Harris. On 1 December, a week after the riot, Sinn Féin announced that they would bring a motion of no confidence in McEntee. In response, the Taoiseach moved a vote of confidence in McEntee on 5 December.

=== Constitutional referendums ===
The government held two referendums on 8 March 2024 on proposed amendments to the Constitution of Ireland. The Thirty-ninth Amendment proposed to expand the constitutional definition of family to include durable relationships outside marriage. The Fortieth Amendment proposed to replace a reference to women's "life within the home" and a constitutional obligation to "endeavour to ensure that mothers shall not be obliged by economic necessity to engage in labour to the neglect of their duties in the home" with a gender-neutral article on supporting care within the family.

Voters comprehensively rejected both bills, with 67.69 percent voting No to the proposed Thirty-ninth Amendment on the Family and 73.93 percent voting No to the proposed Fortieth Amendment on Care. These were the highest and third-highest percentage votes for No in the history of Irish constitutional referendums.

=== Budgets ===
The Minister for Finance, Michael McGrath, and Minister for Public Expenditure, National Development Plan Delivery and Reform, Paschal Donohoe, delivered the following budgets:

- 2024 budget, delivered on 10 October 2023

=== Motions of confidence ===
On 29 March 2023, a motion of confidence in the government, proposed by Taoiseach Leo Varadkar, was approved with 86 votes in favour to 67 against.

On 5 December 2023, a motion of confidence in the Minister for Justice Helen McEntee proposed by Taoiseach Leo Varadkar was approved with 83 votes in favour to 63 against, with one abstention.

=== Resignation ===
Varadkar resigned as leader of Fine Gael on 20 March 2024 and was succeeded on 24 March by Simon Harris. Varadkar resigned as Taoiseach on 8 April.

== 34th government of Ireland ==
34th government of Ireland
- Government of Ireland

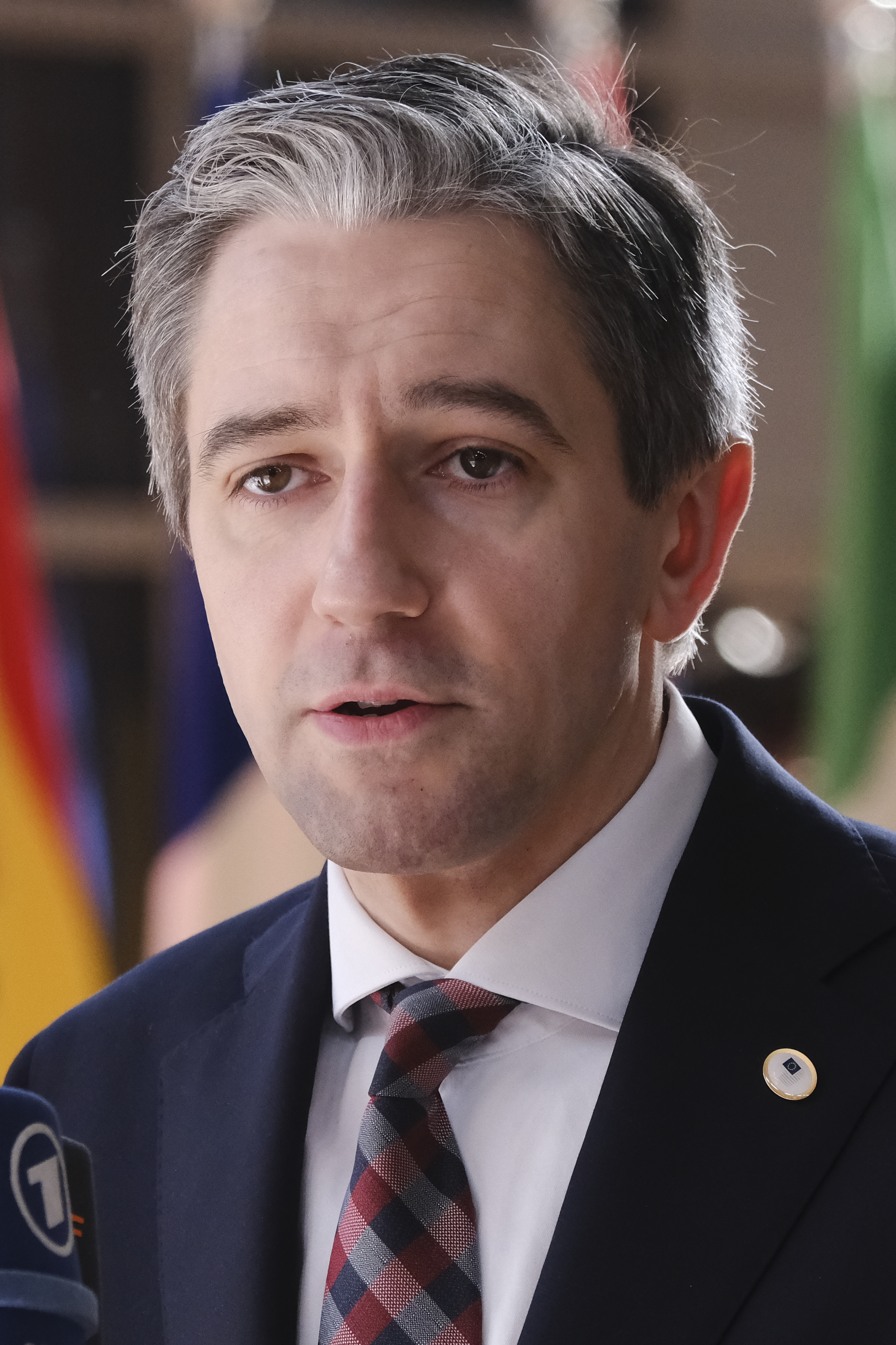
- Simon Harris in 2024
- Date formed: 9 April 2024
- Date dissolved: 23 January 2025

People and organisations
- President: Michael D. Higgins
- Taoiseach: Simon Harris
- Tánaiste: Micheál Martin
- Member parties: Fine Gael; Fianna Fáil; Green Party
- Status in legislature: Majority (coalition)
- Opposition cabinet: McDonald front bench
- Opposition party: Sinn Féin
- Opposition leader: Mary Lou McDonald

History
- Election: 2020 general election
- Legislature terms: 33rd Dáil; 26th Seanad
- Budget: 2025
- Predecessor: 33rd government
- Successor: 35th government

=== Nomination of Taoiseach ===
Following the resignation of Leo Varadkar as Taoiseach on 8 April, the Dáil reconvened on 9 April.

Simon Harris and Michael Healy-Rae were proposed for the nomination of the Dáil for the position of Taoiseach. The motion proposing the nomination of Harris was approved with 88 for and 69 against the motion and Harris was appointed by President Michael D. Higgins. This appointment made Harris Ireland's youngest Taoiseach to date and also marked the first time three Taoisigh were appointed within a single Dáil term.

9 April 2024; Nomination of Simon Harris (FG) as Taoiseach; Motion proposed by Heather Humphreys and seconded by Peter Burke; Absolute majority: 81/160
Vote	Parties	Votes
Yes	Fianna Fáil (36), Fine Gael (32), Green Party (11), Independents (9)	88 / 160
No	Sinn Féin (36), Independents (11), Labour Party (7), Social Democrats (6), Solidarity–People Before Profit (4), Independent Ireland (3), Aontú (1), Right to Change (1)	69 / 160
Absent or not voting	Ceann Comhairle, Fine Gael (1), People Before Profit–Solidarity (1)	3 / 160

=== Government ministers ===
After his appointment as Taoiseach by the president, Simon Harris proposed the members of the government and they were approved by the Dáil. They were appointed by the president on the same day.

Office	Name	Term	Party
Taoiseach	Simon Harris	2024–2025	Fine Gael
Tánaiste	Micheál Martin	2024–2025	Fianna Fáil
Minister for Foreign Affairs	Micheál Martin	2024–2025	Fianna Fáil
Minister for Defence	Micheál Martin	2024–2025	Fianna Fáil
Minister for the Environment, Climate and Communications	Eamon Ryan	2024–2025	Green
Minister for Transport	Eamon Ryan	2024–2025	Green
Minister for Finance	Michael McGrath	2024	Fianna Fáil
Minister for Public Expenditure, National Development Plan Delivery and Reform	Paschal Donohoe	2024–2025	Fine Gael
Minister for Education	Norma Foley	2024–2025	Fianna Fáil
Minister for Tourism, Culture, Arts, Gaeltacht, Sport and Media	Catherine Martin	2024–2025	Green
Minister for Housing, Local Government and Heritage	Darragh O'Brien	2024–2025	Fianna Fáil
Minister for Social Protection	Heather Humphreys	2024–2025	Fine Gael
Minister for Rural and Community Development	Heather Humphreys	2024–2025	Fine Gael
Minister for Agriculture, Food and the Marine	Charlie McConalogue	2024–2025	Fianna Fáil
Minister for Children, Equality, Disability, Integration and Youth	Roderic O'Gorman	2024–2025	Green
Minister for Health	Stephen Donnelly	2024–2025	Fianna Fáil
Minister for Justice	Helen McEntee	2024–2025	Fine Gael
Minister for Further and Higher Education, Research, Innovation and Science	Patrick O'Donovan	2024–2025	Fine Gael
Minister for Enterprise, Trade and Employment	Peter Burke	2024–2025	Fine Gael
==== Change 26 June 2024 ==== Following the resignation of Michael McGrath on his nomination as European Commissioner.
Office	Name	Term	Party
Minister for Finance	Jack Chambers	2024–2025	Fianna Fáil

=== Ministers of state ===
On 9 April 2024, the government on the nomination of the Taoiseach appointed Hildegarde Naughton, TD, Jack Chambers, TD, Sen. Pippa Hackett, and Jennifer Carroll MacNeill, TD, as ministers of state. On 10 April 2024, the government on the nomination of the Taoiseach appointed 16 further ministers of state.

Name	Department(s)	Responsibility	Party
Hildegarde Naughton (In attendance at cabinet)	Taoiseach; Education	Government Chief Whip; Special education and inclusion	Fine Gael
Jack Chambers (In attendance at cabinet)	Transport; Environment, Climate and Communications	International road transport and logistics Postal policy	Fianna Fáil
Pippa Hackett (In attendance at cabinet)	Agriculture, Food and the Marine	Land use and biodiversity	Green
Jennifer Carroll MacNeill	Taoiseach; Foreign Affairs; Defence	European Affairs	Fine Gael
Kieran O'Donnell	Public Expenditure, National Development Plan Delivery and Reform	Office of Public Works	Fine Gael
Ossian Smyth	Public Expenditure, National Development Plan Delivery and Reform; Environment, Climate and Communications	Public procurement and e-government Communications and the circular economy	Green
Colm Burke	Health	Public health, well-being and the national drug strategy	Fine Gael
Martin Heydon	Agriculture, Food and the Marine	Research and development, farm safety and new market department	Fine Gael
Anne Rabbitte	Children, Equality, Disability, Integration and Youth	Disability	Fianna Fáil
Seán Fleming	Foreign Affairs	International development and diaspora	Fianna Fáil
Joe O'Brien	Rural and Community Development; Social Protection; Children, Equality, Disability, Integration and Youth	Community Development and Charities; Integration	Green
Alan Dillon	Housing, Local Government and Heritage	Local government planning	Fine Gael
Malcolm Noonan	Housing, Local Government and Heritage	Nature, heritage and electoral reform	Green
Mary Butler	Health	Mental health and older people	Fianna Fáil
Thomas Byrne	Tourism, Culture, Arts, Gaeltacht, Sport and Media; Education	Sport and physical education; and the Gaeltacht	Fianna Fáil
Niall Collins	Further and Higher Education, Research, Innovation and Science	Skills and Further Education	Fianna Fáil
Neale Richmond	Finance	Financial services, credit unions and insurance	Fine Gael
James Browne	Justice	International law, law Reform and Youth Justice	Fianna Fáil
Dara Calleary	Enterprise, Trade and Employment	Trade promotion and digital transformation	Fianna Fáil
Emer Higgins	Enterprise, Trade and Employment; Social Protection	Business, employment and retail	Fine Gael
==== Change 27 June 2024 ==== Following the appointment of Jack Chambers to government.
Name	Department(s)	Responsibility	Party
Dara Calleary (In attendance at cabinet)	Enterprise, Trade and Employment	Trade promotion and digital transformation	Fianna Fáil
James Lawless	Transport; Environment, Climate and Communications	International and road transport and logistics Postal policy	Fianna Fáil

=== Budgets ===
The Minister for Finance, Jack Chambers, and Minister for Public Expenditure, National Development Plan Delivery and Reform, Paschal Donohoe, delivered the following budgets:

- 2025 budget, delivered on 1 October 2024.

=== Resignation ===
On 8 November 2024, Taoiseach Simon Harris sought a dissolution of the Dáil which was granted by the president, with the new Dáil to convene on 18 December. The 2024 general election took place on 29 November. On 18 December, before the first meeting of the 34th Dáil, Harris submitted his resignation to the president. The other members of the government were also deemed to have resigned, but the taoiseach and the other members of the government continued to carry on their duties until the appointment of their successors on 23 January 2025.

== See also ==
- 2020s in Irish history
