= 2024 Irish budget =

- Presented: 10 October 2023
- Parliament: 33rd Dáil
- Government: 33rd government of Ireland
- Party: Fine Gael; Fianna Fáil; Green Party
- Minister for Finance: Michael McGrath (FF)
- Minister for Public Expenditure, National Development Plan Delivery and Reform: Paschal Donohoe (FG)
- Website: Budget 2024

The 2024 Irish budget was the Irish Government Budget for the 2024 fiscal year, which was presented to Dáil Éireann on 10 October 2023 by Minister for Finance Michael McGrath, and the Minister for Public Expenditure, National Development Plan Delivery and Reform Paschal Donohoe.

== Summary ==
=== Cost of living ===
- Three €150 energy credits for every household – due to be received between the end of 2023 and April 2024
- Fuel allowance recipients receive winter lump sum of €300
- Living alone allowance recipients to get €200 winter lump sum
- Categories including disability allowance, carer's support to get €400 winter lump sum
- Double week pay of all weekly welfare schemes in January
- 9% reduced VAT rate for gas and electricity extended for another year

=== Other ===
- Minimum wage increased to €12.70
- Weekly payments for working age recipients and pension payment increased by €12
- Double payment of Child Benefit before Christmas.
- The extension of child benefit in respect of children aged 18 in full-time education
- Employee PAYE and earned income tax credits increased by €100 each
- Packet of 20 cigarettes up by 75c, bringing the total price to €16.75
- Tax on vaping products to be introduced in Budget 2025
- 25% reduction in weekly childcare fees from September 2024
- Free books scheme extended to all Junior Cycle pupils
- One-off reduction in student contribution fee by €1,000 for free fees students
- One-off 33% reduction for contribution fee for higher education apprentices
