= 2021 Irish budget =

Irish government budget

- Presented: 13 October 2020
- Parliament: 33rd Dáil
- Government: 32nd government of Ireland
- Party: Fine Gael; Fianna Fáil; Green Party
- Minister for Finance: Paschal Donohoe (FG)
- Minister for Public Expenditure and Reform: Michael McGrath (FF)
- Website: Budget 2021

The 2021 Irish budget was the Irish Government Budget for the 2021 fiscal year, which was presented to Dáil Éireann on 13 October 2020 by Minister for Finance Paschal Donohoe, and the Minister for Public Expenditure and Reform Michael McGrath.

== Summary ==
=== COVID-19 ===
- €8.5 billion will be allocated for public services to address the challenges of COVID-19 – including €2.1 billion in contingency funding.
- The Employment Wage Subsidy Scheme will continue until 31 March 2021.
- Self-employed recipients of the COVID-19 Pandemic Unemployment Payment will be able to earn up to €480 per month without losing their payment.
- €10 million will be allocated for the COVID-19 stability fund for community and voluntary organisations, charities and social enterprises.

=== Other ===
- Carbon tax will be increased by €7.50 per tonne in 2021, from €26 to €33.50 per tonne.
- The one-week Christmas bonus will be given to people on a welfare payment for at least four months up to December.
- Tax on a pack of 20 cigarettes is to rise by 50c.
- 300 new teaching posts will be created.
- €2 billion will be provided to fund recruitment of 990 new special needs assistants.
- 50,000 further education and training places in 2020/2021.
- €500 million to facilitate the construction of 9,500 new social housing units in 2021.
- Funding will be provided to train up to 620 new Garda recruits.
- Up to 70 new garda cars will be bought to replace current models which are currently leased.
