= 2022 Irish budget =

- Presented: 12 October 2021
- Parliament: 33rd Dáil
- Government: 32nd government of Ireland
- Party: Fine Gael; Fianna Fáil; Green Party
- Minister for Finance: Paschal Donohoe (FG)
- Minister for Public Expenditure and Reform: Michael McGrath (FF)
- Website: Budget 2022

The 2022 Irish budget was the Irish Government Budget for the 2022 fiscal year, which was presented to Dáil Éireann on 12 October 2021 by the Minister for Finance, Paschal Donohoe, and the Minister for Public Expenditure and Reform, Michael McGrath.

== Summary ==
=== COVID-19 ===
- Employment Wage Subsidy Scheme will remain in place, in a graduated format, until 30 April 2022 - the scheme will close to new employers from 1 January 2022.

=== Other ===
- Excise duty on a packet of 20 cigarettes rises by 50 cent, with a pro-rata increase on other tobacco products.
- €520 million of income tax reductions include increasing the standard rate band by €1,500 and increasing each of the personal tax credit, employee tax credit and earned income credit by €50.
- Reduced VAT rate of 9% for the hospitality sector will remain in place to the end of August 2022.
- Minimum wage rises 30 cent to €10.50 per hour.
- Income tax deduction amounting to 30% of vouched expenses for heat, electricity and broadband incurred while working from home.
- €5 increase in main weekly welfare payments and State pension confirmed, including young jobseeker's allowance.
- Weekly fuel allowance rises by €5 from midnight.
- Double payment of welfare allowances at Christmas agreed - the Christmas Bonus.
- Carbon tax will rise by €7.50 per tonne to €41.
- Petrol and diesel costs will increase from midnight.
- €202 million fund for people to improve the energy efficiency of their homes in 2022.
- Maternity benefit and parental leave payments to be increased by €5 per week.
- 980 additional special education teachers and 1,165 additional Special Needs Assistants.
- Additional 800 Gardaí and 400 civilian staff to be recruited.
- Free GP care to be extended to children aged six and seven years of age.
- €360 million allocated to boost Active Travel and Greenways.
- €40 million to market Ireland overseas as a tourist destination.
