= 2023 Irish budget =

- Presented: 27 September 2022
- Parliament: 33rd Dáil
- Government: 32nd government of Ireland
- Party: Fine Gael; Fianna Fáil; Green Party
- Minister for Finance: Paschal Donohoe (FG)
- Minister for Public Expenditure and Reform: Michael McGrath (FF)
- Website: Budget 2023

The 2023 Irish budget was the Irish Government Budget for the 2023 fiscal year, which was presented to Dáil Éireann on 27 September 2022 by Minister for Finance Paschal Donohoe, and the Minister for Public Expenditure and Reform Michael McGrath.

== Summary ==
=== Cost of living ===
- €12 per week increase for every recipient of a social protection payment
- A double Child Benefit payment (worth €140 per child) to be paid in November in addition to the normal monthly payment
- A once-off double week "Cost of Living Support" payment to social welfare recipients in October, including pensioners, carers, people on disability payments and jobseekers
- Additional €500 for those receiving the Working Family Payment and Carer's Support Grant recipients to be paid in November
- Once-off payment before Christmas of €200 to recipients of the Living Alone Allowance
- Once-off payment of €500 to those who qualify for Disability Allowance, Invalidity Pension and the Blind Pension to be paid in November
- Entry point for higher PAYE rate of 40% increased (by €3,200) to €40,000 a year - below that, the rate remains at 20%
- €600 in electricity credits for all households to be paid in three instalments of €200; the first payment will be made before Christmas, with two further instalments in the New Year
- Free primary school books for all children
- €100 million to help schools deal with rising energy costs in 2022 and to support school transport providers
- Student Contribution Fee cut by €500 for eligible families earning between €62,000 and €100,000
- Income limit to qualify for a 50% reduction in contribution fees under SUSI will be increased from €55,240 to €62,000
- An extra €10 million for further and higher education institutions to help with rising costs
- Funding to support a reduction of up to 25% in the weekly fee for those using the National Childcare Scheme
- 9% VAT rate for electricity and gas extended until 28 February 2023

=== Other ===
- Additional 686 Special Educational Needs teachers
- Additional 1,194 Special Needs Assistants
- Excise duty on a pack of 20 cigarettes rises by 50c, with a pro-rata increase on other tobacco products
- Excise reduction of 21c per litre (petrol), 16c per litre (diesel) and 5.4c (marked gas oil) extended until 28 February 2023
- Carbon taxes on petrol and diesel will go up from €41 to €48.50 per tonne from 12 October
- An overall package of €443 million to help reduce waiting lists
- Expanding free contraception, currently available to women aged 17 to 25, to those aged from 16 to 30 years
