= 2026 Irish budget =

- Presented: 7 October 2025
- Country: Ireland
- Parliament: 34th Dáil
- Government: 35th government of Ireland
- Party: Fine Gael; Fianna Fáil; Regional Independent Group
- Minister for Finance: Paschal Donohoe (FG)
- Minister for Public Expenditure, Infrastructure, Public Service Reform and Digitalisation: Jack Chambers (FF)
- Website: Budget 2026

The 2026 Irish budget was presented to Dáil Éireann on 7 October 2025 by Minister for Finance Paschal Donohoe and Minister for Public Expenditure, Infrastructure, Public Service Reform and Digitalisation Jack Chambers.

The Budget set out the governments fiscal plan for the 2026 fiscal year, focusing on supporting households, strengthening public services, and promoting economic stability. It included significant increases to social welfare payments, child and family supports, a rise in the minimum wage, investment in healthcare and education, housing affordability initiatives and targeted tax reforms to encourage growth while addressing cost-of-living pressures.

== Summary ==
=== Cost of living ===
- €10 weekly increase in core social welfare rates.
- 100% Christmas bonus for approximately 1.5 million long-term welfare recipients, including pensioners, carers, jobseekers, people with disabilities, and lone parents.
- VAT rate for food, catering, and hairdressing services reduced from 13.5% to 9% starting July 2026.
- VAT rate on gas and electricity maintained at 9% until 2030.
- Mortgage interest relief extended for two more years.

=== Other ===
- Child Support Payment increased by €8 per week for children under 12 (to €62) and €16 per week for those over 12 (to €78).
- €300 million package to reduce child poverty to 3% by 2030.
- Minimum wage increased to €14.15 per hour.
- Ceiling for the 2% Universal Social Charge (USC) band raised by €1,318 to €28,700.
- Renters’ tax credit extended until the end of 2028.
- €140 million allocated to retrofitting social housing; €130 million for retrofitting homes for older people.
- €1.2 billion Starter Home Programme introduced.
- Fuel Allowance increased by €5 to €38 per week, with eligibility expanded to around 50,000 additional households receiving the Working Family Payment.
- Healthcare funding increased with 3,300 extra staff and additional beds.
- Education funding of €13.1 billion, including 1,042 new teaching posts, 1,717 special needs assistants, and €1.6 billion for over 300 school building projects.
- Annual student contribution fee for third-level students permanently reduced by €500 to €2,500.
- Research and Development tax credit increased to 35% with a first-year threshold of €87,500.
- Duty on a pack of 20 cigarettes to increase by 50c.
- Domiciliary care allowance will also go up €20 to €380 per month.
