= 2025 Irish budget =

- Presented: 1 October 2024
- Parliament: 33rd Dáil
- Government: 34th government of Ireland
- Party: Fine Gael; Fianna Fáil; Green Party
- Minister for Finance: Jack Chambers (FF)
- Minister for Public Expenditure, National Development Plan Delivery and Reform: Paschal Donohoe (FG)
- Website: Budget 2025

The 2025 Irish budget was the Irish Government Budget for the 2025 fiscal year, which was presented to Dáil Éireann on 1 October 2024 by Minister for Finance Jack Chambers, and the Minister for Public Expenditure, National Development Plan Delivery and Reform Paschal Donohoe.

== Summary ==
=== Cost of living ===
- Energy credit of €250 for all households to be paid in two equal payments.
- Proposal for the 9% reduced VAT rate for gas and electricity to be extended for another six months to April 2025.
- Further €300 lump sum payment to fuel allowance recipients in November.

=== Other ===
- Double payments for some social welfare recipients – €12 increase for those receiving the weekly social protection payment.
- Excise duty on a pack of 20 cigarettes to increase by €1.
- Domestic tax on vapes and e-cigarettes to apply to all e-liquids at rate of 50 cent per ml of e-liquid.
- New 'baby boost' one-off payment of €420 for each newborn child from 1 January.
- Free public transport to be extended to children aged five to eight.
- Free schoolbooks initiative extended up to Leaving Certificate students.
- National minimum wage to increase by 80 cent to €13.50 per hour.
- €7.50 increase on rate of carbon tax on petrol and diesel.
- 495 new beds to health services across hospital and community services.
- Further recruitment of 1,000 Gardaí and up to 150 Garda civilian staff.
