= 2026 budget =

2026 budget may refer to:

- 2026 Australian federal budget
- 2026 Irish budget
- 2026 New Zealand budget
- 2026–27 Pakistan federal budget
- 2026 United Kingdom budget
- 2026 United States federal budget
