= Department of Public Expenditure, Infrastructure, Public Service Reform and Digitalisation =

Irish government department

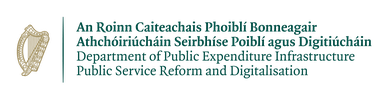

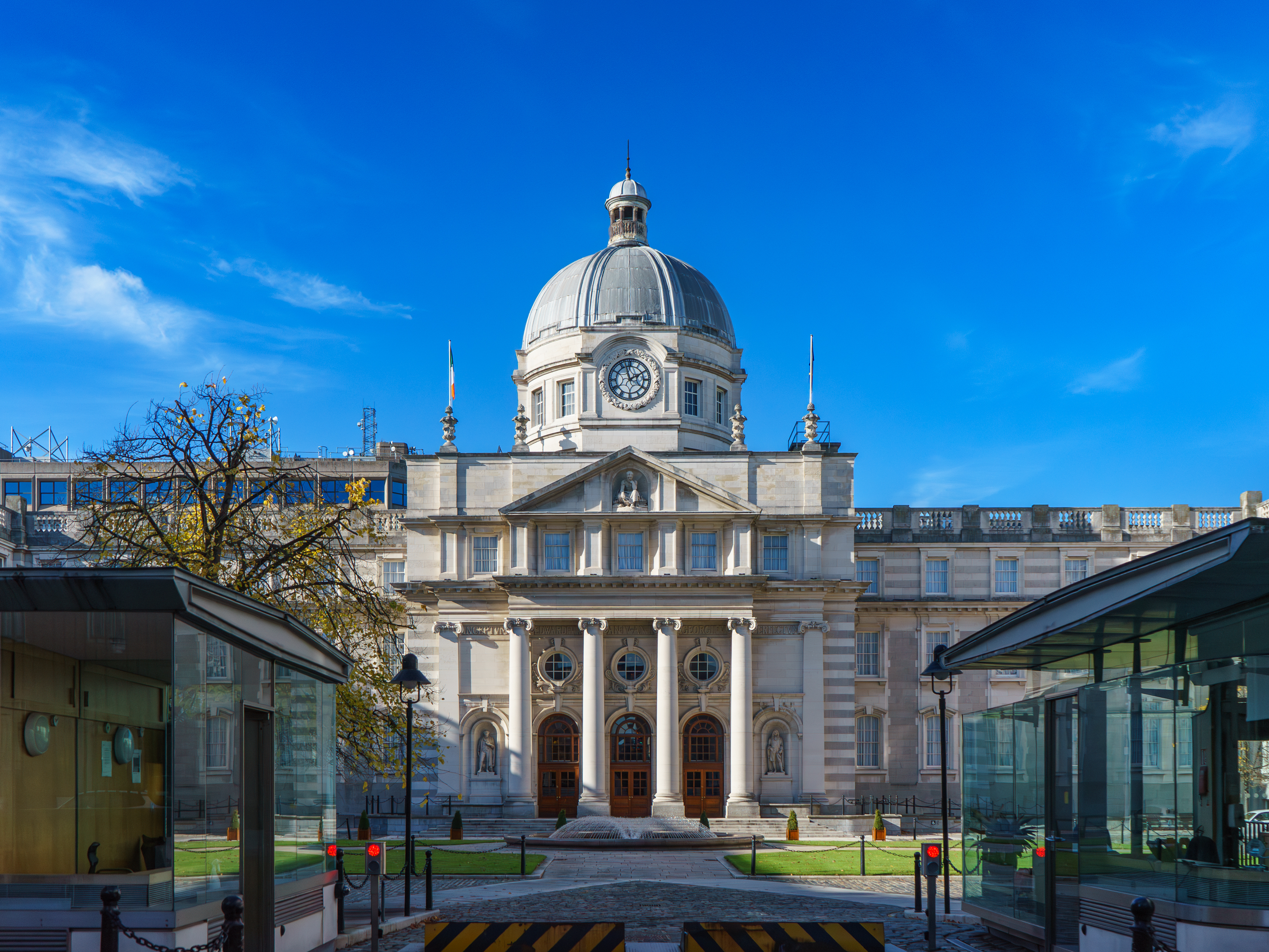

Department overview
- Formed: 6 July 2011
- Jurisdiction: Government of Ireland
- Headquarters: Government Buildings, Merrion Street, Dublin; 53°20′21″N 6°15′13″W
- Minister responsible: Jack Chambers, Minister for Public Expenditure, Infrastructure, Public Service Reform and Digitalisation
- Department executive: David Moloney, Secretary General
- Website: Official website

The Department of Public Expenditure, Infrastructure, Public Service Reform and Digitalisation (Irish: An Roinn Caiteachais Phoiblí, Bonneagair, Athchóiriúcháin Seirbhíse Poiblí agus Digitiúcháin) is a department of the Government of Ireland. It is led by the Minister for Public Expenditure, Infrastructure, Public Service Reform and Digitalisation.

The department was established in July 2011, and took over the functions of public expenditure from the Department of Finance. The department is also responsible for overseeing the reform of the public sector.

== Departmental team ==
The headquarters and ministerial offices of the department are in Government Buildings, Merrion Street, Dublin. The departmental team consists of the following:

- Minister for Public Expenditure, Infrastructure, Public Service Reform and Digitalisation: Jack Chambers, TD
  - Minister of State for the Office of Public Works: Kevin "Boxer" Moran, TD
  - Minister of State for public procurement, digitalisation and eGovernment: Frank Feighan, TD
- Secretary General of the Department: David Moloney

== Overview ==
The department took over two of the six divisions within the Department of Finance. They are:

- Public Expenditure Division – to establish and review short-term and medium-term current and capital public expenditure targets
- Organisation, Management and Training Division – has overall responsibility for the management and development of the civil service

The department has 12 divisions:

- Infrastructure Division
- Corporate Division
- Expenditure Policy Division
- People and Strategy Team
- Office of the Chief Medical Officer
- Office of the Government Chief Information Officer
- Office of Government Procurement
- EU & Public Service Delivery Division
- Public Service Resourcing Division
- Public Service Transformation Division
- Public Service Workforce Division
- Work and Pensions Division

== Aegis bodies ==
The following bodies are under the aegis of the department:

- Office of Public Works
- State Laboratory
- Public Appointments Service
- Office of the Ombudsman
  - Commission for Public Service Appointments
  - Office of the Information Commissioner
  - Office of the Commissioner for Environmental Information
  - Standards in Public Office Commission
- National Shared Services Office
- Regulator of the National Lottery
- Economic and Social Research Institute
- Institute of Public Administration
- Special EU Programmes Body

== History ==
The department was created by the Ministers and Secretaries (Amendment) Act 2011 with Brendan Howlin as its first minister.

Date	Effect
4 July 2011	Establishment of the Department of Public Expenditure and Reform; Transfer of Public expenditure and the public service from the Department of Finance
5 August 2011	Transfer of various functions from the Department of Finance
27 September 2011	Transfer of further functions from the Department of Finance
16 December 2011	Transfer of money laundering and terrorism from the Department of Finance
19 December 2013	Further functions granted to the Minister
1 February 2023	Renamed as the Department of Public Expenditure, National Development Plan Delivery and Reform
1 March 2023	Transfer of Standards in Public Office Commission to the Department of Finance
5 July 2023	Transfer of Standards in Public Office Commission from the Department of Finance
5 June 2025	Renamed as the Department of Public Expenditure, Infrastructure, Public Service Reform and Digitalisation

== Government reform legislation ==
Since its establishment, the department has introduced a number of government reform measures:

- Ombudsman (Amendment) Act 2012, which brought approximately 200 additional public bodies under the scrutiny of the Ombudsman;
- Houses of the Oireachtas (Inquiries, Privileges and Procedures) Act 2013, to provide for Oireachtas inquiries;
- Protected Disclosures Act 2014, protecting whistleblowers;
- Freedom of Information Act 2014, expanding the remit of FOI;
- Registration of Lobbyists Act 2015 providing for a new registration system; and
- Public Sector Standards Bill 2015 to update legislation on ethics in government.
