= Commission for Public Service Appointments =

Statutory oversight body in Ireland

The Commission for Public Service Appointments (CPSA; Irish: Coimisiúin um Cheapacháin Seirbhíse Poiblí) is an independent statutory body which sets standards for recruitment in the public service of the Republic of Ireland. The CPSA licenses the Public Appointments Service (PAS), a separate body which performs the recruitment for the Civil Service and many senior and specialist roles in other parts of the public service.

== Activities ==
The commission's main activities are as follows:

- issuing codes of practice
- carrying out audits of recruitment and selection
- investigating complaints.

=== Codes of practice ===
The commission issues codes of practice concerning recruitment and selection. There are currently five codes of practice, relating to appointments in the Civil Service and Public Service, as well as codes to deal with specific situations such as appointment of persons with disabilities, or emergency short-term appointments in the health public sector.

=== Recruitment and selection audits ===
The commission carries out audits of recruitment and selection in the public sector, all of which are published. Sometimes these include recommendations.

=== Complaints ===
The commission also investigates complaints or formal statutory requests for review under the codes in relation to specific appointments. However it may not quash or alter a recruitment decision.

=== Investigations ===
The commission may authorize investigations with wide powers including the right of entry on premises and the right to inspect documents.

=== Approved recruitment agencies ===
In a new initiative, the commission intends to establish a list of approved recruitment agencies from the private sector which may be used for public service recruitment.

=== Annual reports ===
The commission's annual reports are submitted to each House of the Oireachtas and published on its official website. The commission is supported by a small staff.

== Members of the commission ==
The Commission for Public Service Appointments consists of five ex-officio members, referred to as commissioners.

Office	Officeholder as of 2025
Ceann Comhairle	Verona Murphy TD
Secretary General to the Government of Ireland	John Callinan
Secretary General, Department of Public Expenditure, Infrastructure, Public Service Reform and Digitalisation (Note: Prior to 2011, this position was held by the Secretary General, Public Service Management and Development, Department of Finance; it was amended the Ministers and Secretaries (Amendment) Act 2011.)	David Moloney
Chairperson of the Standards in Public Office Commission	Garrett Sheehan
Ombudsman	Ger Deering

== Office and staff ==
In 2012 the Office of the Commission was amalgamated with the Office of the Ombudsman for administration and accounting purposes. This was for cost-cutting purposes. As a result, the commission depends on the staff of the ombudsman.
