= Minister of State at the Department of Public Expenditure, Infrastructure, Public Service Reform and Digitalisation =

List of Irish ministers of state

The minister of state at the Department of Public Expenditure, Infrastructure, Public Service Reform and Digitalisation is a junior ministerial post in the Department of Public Expenditure, Infrastructure, Public Service Reform and Digitalisation of the Government of Ireland who performs duties and functions delegated by the minister for public expenditure, infrastructure, public service reform and digitalisation. A minister of state does not hold cabinet rank.

As of 2025, there are two ministers of state:

- Kevin "Boxer" Moran, TD – Minister of State with responsibility for the Office of Public Works; and
- Frank Feighan, TD – Minister of State with responsibility for public procurement, digitalisation and eGovernment.

== List of ministers of state ==
=== Department of Public Expenditure and Reform 2011–2023 ===
Name	Term of office		Party	Responsibilities	Government
Brian Hayes	10 March 2011	23 May 2014	Fine Gael	Public Service Reform and the Office of Public Works	29th
Simon Harris	15 July 2014	6 May 2016	Fine Gael	Office of Public Works and Public Procurement	29th
Eoghan Murphy	19 May 2016	14 June 2017	Fine Gael	eGovernment and Public Procurement	30th
Seán Canney	19 May 2016	3 June 2017	Independent	Office of Public Works and flood relief	30th
Kevin "Boxer" Moran	3 June 2017	14 June 2017	Independent	Office of Public Works and flood relief	30th
Kevin "Boxer" Moran	20 June 2017	27 June 2020	Independent	Office of Public Works and flood relief	31st
Patrick O'Donovan	20 June 2017	27 June 2020	Fine Gael	Public Procurement, Open Government and eGovernment	31st
Patrick O'Donovan	1 July 2020	17 December 2022	Fine Gael	Office of Public Works	32nd
Ossian Smyth	1 July 2020	17 December 2022	Green	Public Procurement and eGovernment	32nd
=== Department of Public Expenditure, National Development Plan Delivery and Reform 2023–2025 ===
Name	Term of office		Party	Responsibilities	Government
Patrick O'Donovan	21 December 2022	9 April 2024	Fine Gael	Office of Public Works	33rd
Ossian Smyth	21 December 2022	23 January 2025	Green	Public Procurement and eGovernment	33rd • 34th
Kieran O'Donnell	10 April 2024	23 January 2025	Fine Gael	Office of Public Works	34th
=== Department of Public Expenditure, Infrastructure, Public Service Reform and Digitalisation 2025–present ===
Name	Term of office		Party	Responsibilities	Government
Kevin "Boxer" Moran	29 January 2025	Incumbent	Independent	Office of Public Works	35th
Emer Higgins	29 January 2025	18 November 2025	Fine Gael	Public procurement, digitalisation and eGovernment	35th
Frank Feighan	18 November 2025	Incumbent	Fine Gael	Public procurement, digitalisation and eGovernment	35th
