= 2026–27 Pakistan federal budget =

Pakistan federal budget

2026–2027 Pakistan Federal Budget
Finance Act, 2026
- State emblem of Pakistan
- Submitted: 12 June 2026
- Submitted by: Muhammad Aurangzeb
- Passed: 23 June 2026
- Country: Pakistan
- Parliament: Parliament of Pakistan
- Government: Government of Shehbaz Sharif
- Party: Pakistan Muslim League (N) (PML-N)
- Total revenue: ▲ Rs. 17.815 trillion (US$64 billion)
- Total expenditures: ▲ Rs. 18.771 trillion (US$67 billion)
- Debt payment: ▲ Rs. 8.054 trillion (US$29 billion) interest payments
- Deficit: ▼3.6% of GDP
- Website: Federal Budget 2026–27

The 2026–27 Pakistan federal budget is the federal budget of Pakistan for the fiscal year beginning on 1 July 2026 and ending on 30 June 2027.

On 12 June 2026, Finance Minister Muhammad Aurangzeb presented the federal budget with a total outlay of ₨18.771 trillion (US$67.49 billion).

On 23 June 2026, the National Assembly passed the Finance Bill 2026. On 25 June 2026, President Asif Ali Zardari gave his assent to the Finance Bill 2026-27.

== See also ==
- Economy of Pakistan
- Taxation in Pakistan
