= Standards in Public Office Commission =

Oversight body in the Irish civil service

The Standards in Public Office Commission (SIPO) (Irish: Coimisiún um Chaighdeáin in Oifigí Poiblí) is an independent body established in December 2001 by the Irish Government under the Standards in Public Office Act 2001. It replaced the Public Offices Commission which had been established in November 1995 by the Ethics in Public Office Act 1995.

== Functions of the commission ==
The commission is the supervisory body for compliance with legislation concerning ethical issues regarding politicians, office holders and civil servants

=== Political donations ===
The commission supervises compliance with legislation limiting donations to political parties in Ireland and election expenditure. This is a broad remit and applies to donations received by sitting Members of both Houses of the Oireachtas and members of the European Parliament representing Irish constituencies. It also applies to individual candidates at elections for Dáil Éireann, Seanad Éireann, the European Parliament and the president of Ireland. The commission maintains the Register of Corporate Donors and the Register of Third Parties. The Commission makes reports to the Chairman of Dáil Éireann Ceann Comhairle in relation to donations.

=== Disclosure of interests by politicians ===
The commission supervises the disclosure of interests by politicians. All members of the Houses of the Oireachtas must provide the commission with tax clearance certificates. This also applies to the Attorney General and senior State-appointed members of public bodies. The Commission lays down guidelines and gives advice in individual cases. The Commission provides these statements of interests to the Clerk of Dáil Éireann or the Clerk of Seanad Éireann as appropriate, who publish registers of members' interests.

=== Expenditure of state funding ===
The commission monitors the expenditure of State funding by political parties. It makes reports to the Chairman of Dáil Éireann Ceann Comhairle on the use of State financing by political parties under the Electoral Acts.

=== Party leaders' allowances and Parliamentary Activities Allowance ===
The Commission examines expenditure paid from the annual allowances to the leaders of parliamentary parties for expenses arising from the parties' parliamentary activities, including research. The commission makes reports to the Minister for Finance on the expenditure of the party leaders' allowances. Since 1 July 2014, the Party Leader's Allowance has been replaced by the Parliamentary Activities Allowance.

=== Complaints and investigations ===
The commission may receive complaints and carry out investigations against alleged breaches of the Ethics Acts. It may not receive complaints about Members of the Oireachtas as these are dealt with by the Oireachtas.

The commission may carry out investigations and hold sittings under the Ethics Acts. It provides a report to interested parties and those specified in the legislation. The investigation reports are published on its website.

=== Codes of conduct, guidelines and advice ===
The commission issues codes of conduct for politicians, office holders, and civil servants. It also issues statutory guidelines for compliance. The commission may also designate officials to give individual advice to individuals affected by the Ethics Acts.

=== Own initiative inquiries ===
The commission can decide to open an investigation on its own initiative for breaches of the Ethics Acts.

=== Annual reports and recommendations for change ===
The Commission makes annual reports to the Minister for Public Expenditure and Reform which are laid before each House of the Oireachtas. In the annual reports, the commission makes recommendations for changes to ethics and other relevant legislation. The 2013 annual report summarises all previous recommendations.

== Regulation of lobbying ==
The commission was given new responsibilities by the Regulation of Lobbying Act 2015 which introduced a statutory register of lobbying, and rules concerning the practice of lobbying. The purpose of the act was to provide for a web-based 'Register of Lobbying' to make information available to the public on the identity of those communicating with designated public officials on specific policy, legislative matters or prospective decisions. The act provides restrictions and conditions on the taking up of certain employments by certain designated officials for a specified period of time where a possible conflict of interest arises. The act states that the Standards Commission will be the Registrar of Lobbying and will establish an online Register of Lobbying. Under the act, the Standards Commission is tasked with overseeing the implementation of the register, monitoring compliance, providing guidance and assistance and where necessary, and investigating and pursuing suspected breaches of legal requirements. The act was signed into law on Wednesday 11 March 2015.

The focus in the initial period of the implementation of the act was on guidance and information and ensuring that registrants were familiar with the process of submitting their returns online. Enforcement provisions provided for in Part 4 of the Regulation of Lobbying Act 2015 did not come into effect until 1 January 2017. Since 1 January 2017, however, a person who does not register as required, or does not submit a return of their lobbying activities or is late submitting a return of their lobbying activities, is subject to the offences and penalties provided for in the act.

== Register of third parties ==
Since the Electoral (Amendment) Act 2001, SIPO has maintained a register of "third parties", defined as "any individual or group, other than a registered political party or election candidate, who or which accepts, in a particular calendar year, a donation for political purposes exceeding the value of €100". Auditing of "third party" activities addresses the minor issue of outside endorsements of election candidates and the major issue of interest groups and civil society organisations which lobby during referendum campaigns. SIPO said in a 2003 report:

it is not the intention of the Standards Commission to pursue each individual and group involved in every type of campaign where the activities could be covered by the definition of political purposes. Such individuals or groups will, however, be contacted by the Standards Commission for clarification of their position if a complaint, or other information, is received about their failure to register.

After SIPO wrote to some groups which advocated against the Protection of Life During Pregnancy Act 2013, Catherine Murphy complained that SIPO had no power to enforce registration. SIPO noted in a 2008 report that 'In practice, the vast majority of third parties have registered with the Standards Commission in relation to a particular campaign and their "political" activity has not extended beyond that campaign.' Whether a given a donation is for "political purposes" may be controversial. In 2018, Amnesty International Ireland was ordered to return a 2015 donation from the Open Society Foundations on the grounds that contravened the prohibition on foreign donorations because it was political, being related to liberalising Ireland's abortion laws.

== Members of the Commission ==
There are six members of the Standards Commission. The chairperson is a judge, or a former judge, of the Supreme Court or the High Court, and is appointed by the President of Ireland on the advice of the Irish Government following resolutions passed by each House of the Oireachtas recommending the appointment. There are four ex officio members: the Comptroller and Auditor General, the Ombudsman, the Clerk of Dáil Éireann and the Clerk of Seanad Éireann. The sixth member is a former member of one of the Houses of the Oireachtas, and is appointed by the Irish Government following approval by each House of the Oireachtas.

The Chairperson of the Standards Commission is ex officio member (Commissioner) of the Commission for Public Service Appointments.

== See also ==
- Good governance
- Ethics
