= Jack Chambers (politician) =

Irish politician (born 1990)

Jack Chambers TD
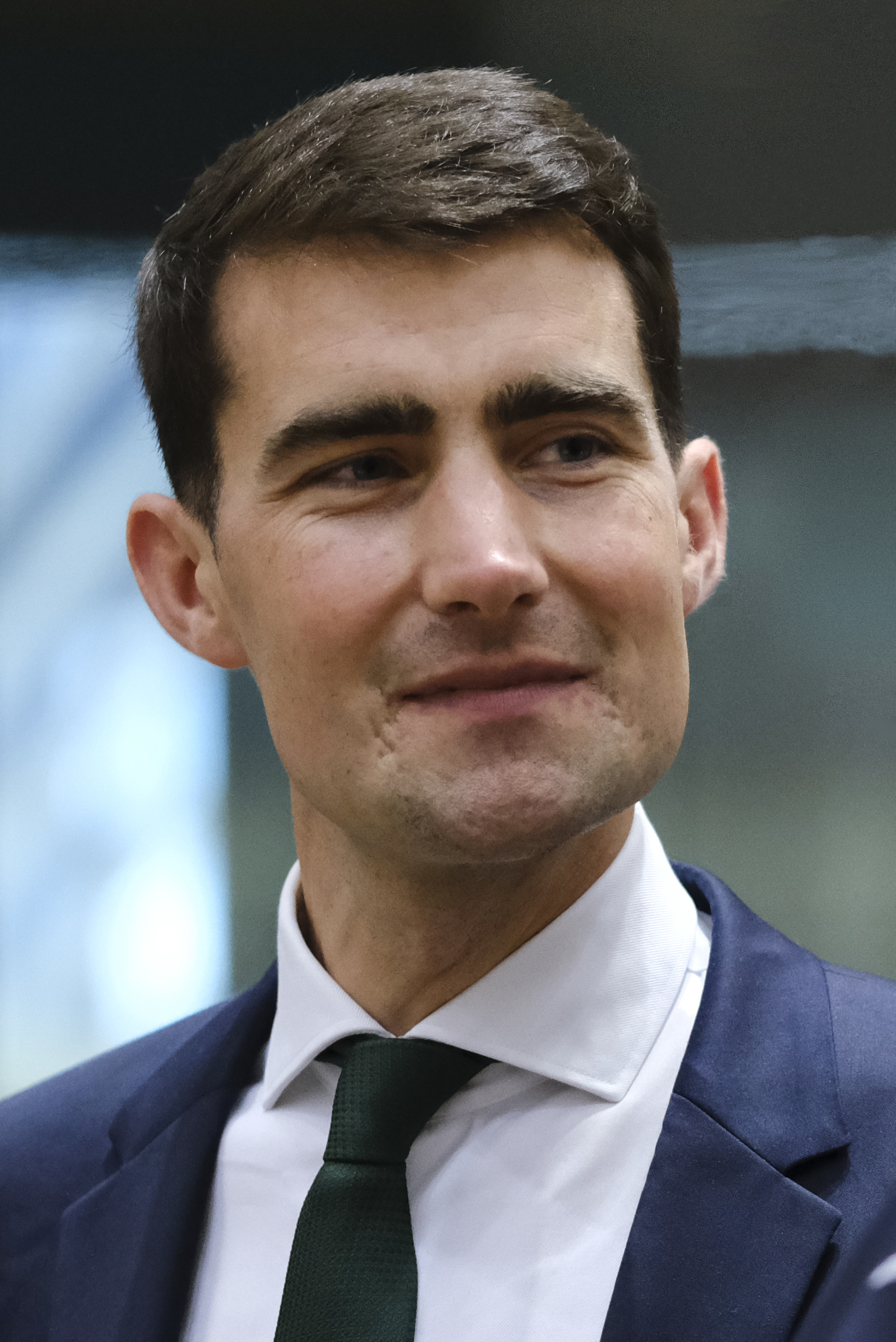
- Chambers in 2024

Minister for Public Expenditure, Infrastructure, Public Service Reform and Digitalisation
- Incumbent
- Assumed office 23 January 2025
- Taoiseach: Micheál Martin
- Preceded by: Paschal Donohoe

Minister for Finance
- In office 26 June 2024 – 23 January 2025
- Taoiseach: Simon Harris
- Preceded by: Michael McGrath
- Succeeded by: Paschal Donohoe

Deputy leader of Fianna Fáil
- Incumbent
- Assumed office 19 June 2024
- Leader: Micheál Martin
- Preceded by: Dara Calleary (2020)

Minister of State
- 2022–2024: Transport
- 2022–2024: Environment, Climate and Communications
- 2020–2022: Government Chief Whip
- 2020–2022: Defence
- 2020–2022: Tourism, Culture, Arts, Gaeltacht, Sport and Media
- 2020: Finance

Teachta Dála
- Incumbent
- Assumed office February 2016
- Constituency: Dublin West

Personal details
- Born: 1990 (age 35–36) Galway, Ireland
- Party: Fianna Fáil
- Education: Trinity College Dublin; Royal College of Surgeons
- Website: jackchambers.ie

Jack Chambers (born 1990) is an Irish Fianna Fáil politician and Minister for Public Expenditure, Infrastructure, Public Service Reform and Digitalisation since January 2025. He previously served as Minister for Finance from 2024 to 2025, a Minister of State attending cabinet from July 2020 to June 2024, and served as Government Chief Whip from July 2020 to December 2022. He has been Deputy leader of Fianna Fáil since 2024. He has been a Teachta Dála (TD) for the Dublin West constituency since the 2016 general election.

== Early and personal life ==
Chambers was born in Galway in 1990 but has lived in Dublin since early childhood. He resides in the Castleknock area of west Dublin. His father, Frank Chambers, from Newport, County Mayo, is a consultant at the Mater Private Hospital, and as chair of Fianna Fáil's Dublin West constituency party was a political ally of Brian Lenihan Jnr. His mother, Barbara Farragher, is from Hollymount, County Mayo. He is not related to the former senator Lisa Chambers, though both have family roots in Newport. He attended Belvedere College and earned a Law and Political Science degree from Trinity College Dublin, before enrolling in medicine at the RCSI, graduating in 2020 after interrupting his studies early in his political career.

Chambers is a member of Dublin GAA club St Brigid's. In January 2024, he came out as gay. In an Instagram post Chambers said: "I am starting 2024 by telling you all that I am proud to say that I am gay. As a politician and citizen, I want to share this today as part of who I am."

== Political career ==
In 2014, Chambers reopened the constituency office which had been closed after the death of Brian Lenihan in 2011. He was elected to Fingal County Council in the 2014 local elections, topping the poll in the Castleknock local electoral area. He was deputy mayor of Fingal from 2015 until vacating his council seat on election to the Dáil in February 2016.

In March 2018, Micheál Martin appointed Chambers as spokesperson for Defence. At the 2020 general election, he was re-elected as a TD for Dublin West.

When Martin became Taoiseach, he nominated Chambers as Minister of State at the Department of Finance on 1 July 2020. A fortnight later, after Barry Cowen was sacked as Minister for Agriculture, Food and the Marine, Martin promoted Dara Calleary to replace Cowen, with Chambers succeeding Calleary as Government Chief Whip and Minister of State for Sport and the Gaeltacht. Chambers said he would take an "intensive Irish language course" to prepare for the latter responsibility, as he did not speak Irish fluently at the time. On 17 November 2020, Chambers was appointed to the additional post of Minister of State at the Department of Defence.

In December 2022, after Leo Varadkar became Taoiseach, Chambers was reassigned as Minister of State at the Department of Transport with special responsibility for International and Road Transport and Logistics and Minister of State at the Department of the Environment, Climate and Communications with special responsibility for Postal Policy.

In June 2023, Chambers was appointed as Fianna Fáil's director of local elections for the 2024 local elections.

On 19 June 2024, Micheál Martin appointed Chambers as Fianna Fáil's deputy leader.

On 26 June 2024, Chambers was appointed as Minister for Finance, succeeding Michael McGrath who was nominated by the government as Ireland's next European Commissioner. In doing so, Chambers became the youngest Minister for Finance since Irish revolutionary leader Michael Collins.

On 1 October 2024, Chambers presented his first budget as Minister for Finance.

For the 2024 general election, Chambers was appointed Director of Elections for Fianna Fáil. He was subsequently re-elected to the Dáil. During a TV debate during the election, The Irish Times reported that he repeatedly spoke over his cabinet colleague Hildegarde Naughton. During the 2020 Irish general election campaign, Chambers had been criticised on social media for his conduct with RTÉ host Claire Byrne during a debate.

On 23 January 2025, Chambers was appointed as Minister for Public Expenditure, Infrastructure, Public Service Reform and Digitalisation in the government led by Micheál Martin, while Paschal Donohoe replaced him as Minister for Finance.

In June 2025, Chambers attended a meeting of the Bilderberg Group, in Stockholm

== Political views ==
On 3 May 2018, he, along with several other Fianna Fáil TDs, called for a No vote in the referendum to remove the constitutional prohibition of abortion. He has since stated that his position has evolved and that he supports the 2018 abortion legislation allowing abortion on demand up to 12 weeks of pregnancy, and up to 24 weeks in other circumstances including risk to the life of the mother or foetus.

Honorary titles
Preceded by Simon Harris	Baby of the Dáil; 2016–2020	Succeeded by James O'Connor
Political offices
Preceded by Michael W. D'Arcy	Minister of State at the Department of Finance; 2020	Succeeded by Seán Fleming
Preceded by Dara Calleary	Government Chief Whip; 2020–2022	Succeeded by Hildegarde Naughton
Preceded by Dara Calleary	Minister of State at the Department of Tourism, Culture, Arts, Gaeltacht, Sport and Media; 2020–2022	Succeeded by Patrick O'Donovan
Preceded by Paul Kehoe	Minister of State at the Department of Defence; 2020–2022	Succeeded by Peter Burke
Preceded by Hildegarde Naughton; Ossian Smyth	Minister of State at the Department of the Environment, Climate and Communications; 2022–2024	Succeeded by James Lawless
Preceded by Hildegarde Naughton	Minister of State at the Department of Transport; 2022–2024	Succeeded by James Lawless
Preceded by Michael McGrath	Minister for Finance; 2024–2025	Succeeded by Paschal Donohoe
Preceded by Paschal Donohoe as Minister for Public Expenditure, National Development Plan Delivery and Reform	Minister for Public Expenditure, Infrastructure, Public Service Reform and Digitalisation; 2025–present	Incumbent
Party political offices
Preceded by Dara Calleary (2020)	Deputy leader of Fianna Fáil; 2024–present	Incumbent

Dáil	Election	Deputy (Party)	Deputy (Party)	Deputy (Party)	Deputy (Party)	Deputy (Party)
22nd	1981	Jim Mitchell (FG)	Brian Lenihan Snr (FF)	Richard Burke (FG)	Eileen Lemass (FF)	Brian Fleming (FG)
23rd	1982 (Feb)	Jim Mitchell (FG)	Brian Lenihan Snr (FF)	Richard Burke (FG)	Liam Lawlor (FF)	Brian Fleming (FG)
23rd	1982 by-election	Jim Mitchell (FG)	Brian Lenihan Snr (FF)	Liam Skelly (FG)	Liam Lawlor (FF)	Brian Fleming (FG)
24th	1982 (Nov)	Jim Mitchell (FG)	Brian Lenihan Snr (FF)	Liam Skelly (FG)	Eileen Lemass (FF)	Tomás Mac Giolla (WP)
25th	1987	Jim Mitchell (FG)	Brian Lenihan Snr (FF)	Pat O'Malley (PDs)	Liam Lawlor (FF)	Tomás Mac Giolla (WP)
26th	1989	Jim Mitchell (FG)	Brian Lenihan Snr (FF)	Austin Currie (FG)	Liam Lawlor (FF)	Tomás Mac Giolla (WP)
27th	1992	Joan Burton (Lab)	Brian Lenihan Snr (FF)	Austin Currie (FG)	Liam Lawlor (FF)	4 seats 1992–2002
27th	1996 by-election	Joan Burton (Lab)	Brian Lenihan Jnr (FF)	Austin Currie (FG)	Liam Lawlor (FF)	4 seats 1992–2002
28th	1997	Joe Higgins (SP)	Brian Lenihan Jnr (FF)	Austin Currie (FG)	Liam Lawlor (FF)	4 seats 1992–2002
29th	2002	Joe Higgins (SP)	Brian Lenihan Jnr (FF)	Joan Burton (Lab)	3 seats 2002–2011	
30th	2007	Leo Varadkar (FG)	Brian Lenihan Jnr (FF)	Joan Burton (Lab)	3 seats 2002–2011	
31st	2011	Leo Varadkar (FG)	Brian Lenihan Jnr (FF)	Joan Burton (Lab)	Joe Higgins (SP)	4 seats 2011–2024
31st	2011 by-election	Leo Varadkar (FG)	Patrick Nulty (Lab)	Joan Burton (Lab)	Joe Higgins (SP)	4 seats 2011–2024
31st	2014 by-election	Leo Varadkar (FG)	Ruth Coppinger (SP)	Joan Burton (Lab)	Joe Higgins (SP)	4 seats 2011–2024
32nd	2016	Leo Varadkar (FG)	Ruth Coppinger (AAA–PBP)	Joan Burton (Lab)	Jack Chambers (FF)	4 seats 2011–2024
33rd	2020	Leo Varadkar (FG)	Paul Donnelly (SF)	Roderic O'Gorman (GP)	Jack Chambers (FF)	4 seats 2011–2024
34th	2024	Emer Currie (FG)	Paul Donnelly (SF)	Roderic O'Gorman (GP)	Jack Chambers (FF)	Ruth Coppinger (PBP–S)
