= Michael McGrath (Irish politician) =

Irish politician (born 1976)

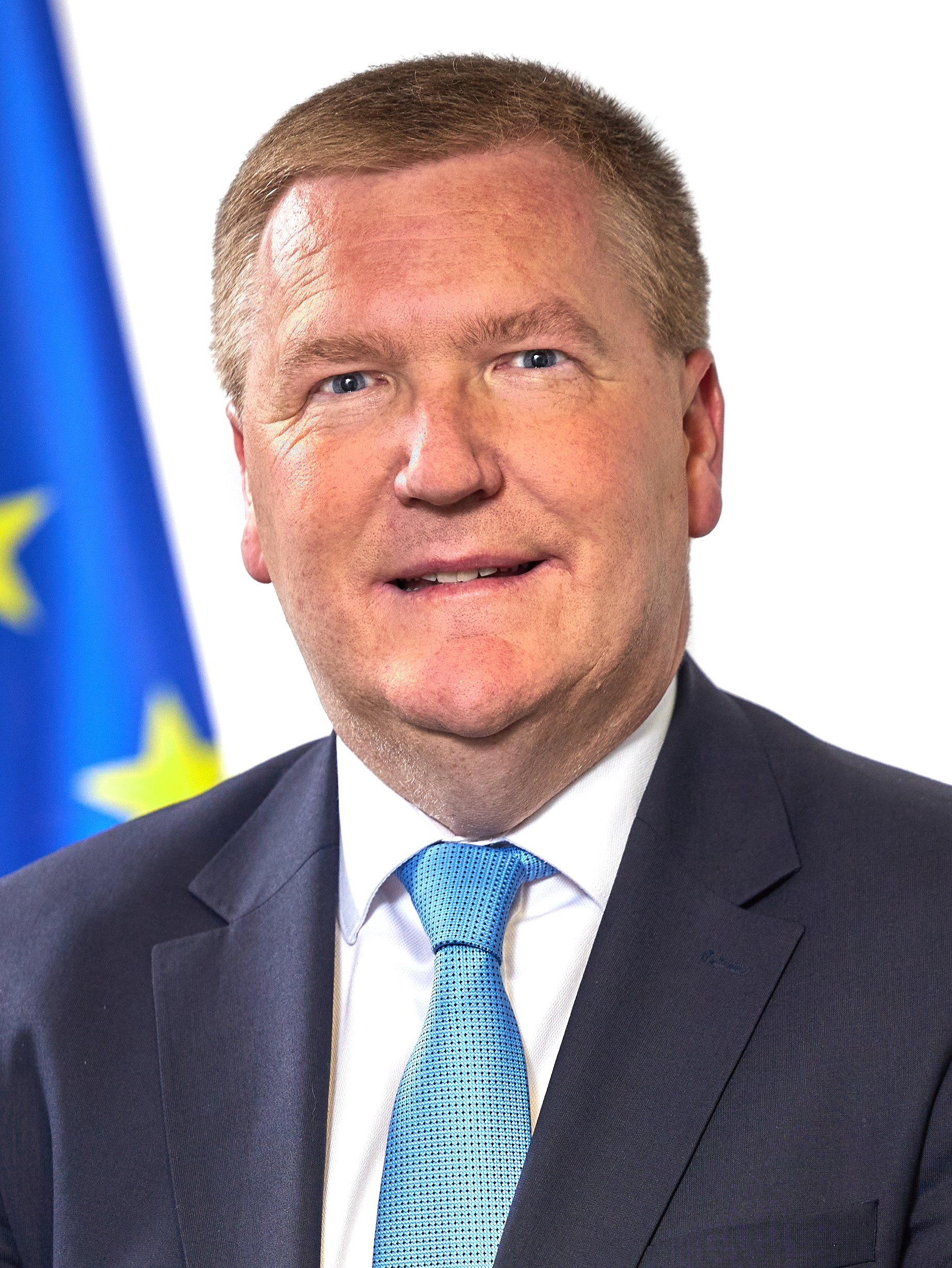
- McGrath in 2024

European Commissioner for Democracy, Justice and Rule of Law
- Incumbent
- Assumed office 1 December 2024
- Commission: Von der Leyen II
- Preceded by: Didier Reynders

Minister for Finance
- In office 17 December 2022 – 26 June 2024
- Taoiseach: Leo Varadkar; Simon Harris
- Preceded by: Paschal Donohoe
- Succeeded by: Jack Chambers

Minister for Public Expenditure and Reform
- In office 27 June 2020 – 17 December 2022
- Taoiseach: Micheál Martin
- Preceded by: Paschal Donohoe
- Succeeded by: Paschal Donohoe

Teachta Dála
- In office May 2007 – November 2024
- Constituency: Cork South-Central

Personal details
- Born: 23 August 1976 (age 50) Cork, Ireland
- Party: Fianna Fáil
- Spouse: Sarah McGrath (m. 2004)
- Children: 7
- Relatives: Séamus McGrath (brother)
- Education: University College Cork
- Michael McGrath's voice (2:53) Interview recorded July 2023

Michael McGrath (/məˈɡræh/; born 23 August 1976) is an Irish Fianna Fáil politician and EU Commissioner for Democracy, Justice, the Rule of Law and Consumer Protection. He previously served as Minister for Finance from December 2022 to June 2024 and Minister for Public Expenditure and Reform from 2020 to 2022. He was a Teachta Dála (TD) for the Cork South-Central constituency from 2007 to 2024.

== Early life ==
McGrath was born in 1976 and grew up in Passage West in Cork. His parents are described as having been non-political. He studied commerce at University College Cork and later qualified as a chartered accountant with KPMG and worked subsequently as Financial Controller of RedFM and Head of Management Information and Systems, University College Cork.

== Political career ==
He was a member of Passage West Town Council from 1999 to 2007, and a member of Cork County Council for the Carrigaline local electoral area from 2004 to 2007. McGrath was first elected to the Dáil in 2007, and subsequently, his brother Séamus was co-opted to his county council seat. Séamus would, reportedly, become McGrath's closest political confidant and secured the largest number of votes in the 2024 Irish Local Elections.

McGrath was one of the few Fianna Fáil TDs to survive their disastrous performance in the 2011 general election. In the aftermath, McGrath became the Opposition Spokesperson on Public Expenditure and Reform but also held the role of Spokesperson for Finance following the death of Brian Lenihan in June 2011.

McGrath represented Fianna Fáil in the Oireachtas delegation that met the Bundestag's Budgetary and European Affairs committees, in Berlin in late January 2012.

At the 2016 general election, McGrath outpolled his party leader Micheál Martin, with whom he shares a constituency.

He represented Fianna Fáil in talks on government formation in 2016 and 2020.

=== Minister for Public Expenditure and Reform (2020–2022) ===
In June 2020, following the formation of a coalition government between Fianna Fáil, Fine Gael and the Green Party, McGrath was appointed as Minister for Public Expenditure and Reform.

As Minister for Public Expenditure and Reform, McGrath was responsible for bringing forward Ireland's €165 billion National Development Plan 2021-2030 and negotiating two public sector-wide pay agreements.

He also developed Ireland's National Recovery and Resilience Plan under the EU's Recovery and Resilience Facility (Next Generation EU) and was responsible for the Brexit Adjustment Reserve fund, the development of the Peace Plus Programme, and Ireland's European Regional Development (ERDF) Programmes.

=== Minister for Finance (2022–2024) ===
McGrath became Minister for Finance on 17 December 2022 as part of a cabinet reshuffle when Leo Varadkar succeeded Micheál Martin as Taoiseach as agreed in the coalition deal between Fianna Fáil, Fine Gael and the Green Party.

In Finance Bill 2023, McGrath steered a range of important and complex legislation through the Irish parliament including the transposition of the EU Minimum Taxation Directive.

In 2024 McGrath established two new long-term funds – the Future Ireland Fund, and the Infrastructure, Climate and Nature Fund – to underpin the sustainability and resilience of Ireland's public finances into the future.

Budget 2024 introduced a range of income tax reductions and measures to support domestic enterprise.

=== European Commissioner ===
On 25 June 2024, he was named by the government as Ireland's nominee for European Commissioner. He was succeeded by Jack Chambers as Minister for Finance. On 17 September 2024, McGrath was announced as EU Commissioner-designate for Democracy, Justice and Rule of Law. He is responsible for the Digital Fairness Act. As of May 2025, his portfolio as Commissioner was defined as Democracy, Justice, the Rule of Law and Consumer Protection.

== Political views and profile ==
In a party conference speech in April 2024, McGrath gave an insight into the influences on his political outlook highlighting that as a family "The State was there for us when we needed it," adding that he was able to go to college with the help of scholarships while many societies around the world would have denied someone like him the opportunity to progress.

He has expressed his support for public expenditure stating "We are a party that believes everyone should have the opportunity to progress irrespective of their background. We believe there should be a safety net for everyone that needs it."

In Government, McGrath established a close working relationship with Fine Gael Public Expenditure Minister Paschal Donohoe which was viewed as a key dynamic underpinning the coalition Government.

McGrath has been described by the Phoenix magazine as being on the right wing of Fianna Fáil and as conservative, both socially and economically. McGrath opposed the removal of Article 40.3.3° from the Irish constitution (which prevented the Oireachtas from legislating for abortion) during the 2018 abortion referendum.

Following the referendum being passed, McGrath then voted in favour of the Health (Regulation of Termination of Pregnancy) Act 2018, legislation which provided for the introduction of abortion.

McGrath has been described as "technocratic" and likened to a civil servant in his approach to politics. His grasp of economics, as well as his attention to detail, have been praised as his strong points.

Before he was nominated European Commissioner, many political commentators had suggested McGrath as a potential contender for the leadership of Fianna Fáil.

== Personal life ==
McGrath has been married to Sarah McGrath since 2004, they met while working as trainees at the same accountancy firm. They have seven children, five boys and two girls, his family home is in Carrigaline, County Cork.

His brother Séamus McGrath won a seat at the 2024 Irish general election for the same constituency.

Political offices
Preceded by Paschal Donohoe	Minister for Public Expenditure and Reform; 2020–2022	Succeeded by Paschal Donohoe
Preceded by Paschal Donohoe	Minister for Finance; 2022–2024	Succeeded by Jack Chambers
Preceded by Mairead McGuinness	Irish European Commissioner; 2024–present	Incumbent

Dáil	Election	Deputy (Party)	Deputy (Party)	Deputy (Party)	Deputy (Party)	Deputy (Party)
22nd	1981	Eileen Desmond (Lab)	Gene Fitzgerald (FF)	Pearse Wyse (FF)	Hugh Coveney (FG)	Peter Barry (FG)
23rd	1982 (Feb)	Eileen Desmond (Lab)	Gene Fitzgerald (FF)	Pearse Wyse (FF)	Jim Corr (FG)	Peter Barry (FG)
24th	1982 (Nov)	Eileen Desmond (Lab)	Gene Fitzgerald (FF)	Pearse Wyse (FF)	Hugh Coveney (FG)	Peter Barry (FG)
25th	1987	Toddy O'Sullivan (Lab)	John Dennehy (FF)	Batt O'Keeffe (FF)	Pearse Wyse (PDs)	Peter Barry (FG)
26th	1989	Toddy O'Sullivan (Lab)	John Dennehy (FF)	Micheál Martin (FF)	Pearse Wyse (PDs)	Peter Barry (FG)
27th	1992	Toddy O'Sullivan (Lab)	Batt O'Keeffe (FF)	Micheál Martin (FF)	Pat Cox (PDs)	Peter Barry (FG)
27th	1994 by-election	Toddy O'Sullivan (Lab)	Batt O'Keeffe (FF)	Micheál Martin (FF)	Hugh Coveney (FG)	Peter Barry (FG)
28th	1997	John Dennehy (FF)	Batt O'Keeffe (FF)	Micheál Martin (FF)	Hugh Coveney (FG)	Deirdre Clune (FG)
28th	1998 by-election	John Dennehy (FF)	Batt O'Keeffe (FF)	Micheál Martin (FF)	Simon Coveney (FG)	Deirdre Clune (FG)
29th	2002	John Dennehy (FF)	Batt O'Keeffe (FF)	Micheál Martin (FF)	Simon Coveney (FG)	Dan Boyle (GP)
30th	2007	Ciarán Lynch (Lab)	Michael McGrath (FF)	Micheál Martin (FF)	Simon Coveney (FG)	Deirdre Clune (FG)
31st	2011	Ciarán Lynch (Lab)	Michael McGrath (FF)	Micheál Martin (FF)	Simon Coveney (FG)	Jerry Buttimer (FG)
32nd	2016	Donnchadh Ó Laoghaire (SF)	Michael McGrath (FF)	Micheál Martin (FF)	Simon Coveney (FG)	4 seats 2016–2024
33rd	2020	Donnchadh Ó Laoghaire (SF)	Michael McGrath (FF)	Micheál Martin (FF)	Simon Coveney (FG)	4 seats 2016–2024
34th	2024	Donnchadh Ó Laoghaire (SF)	Séamus McGrath (FF)	Micheál Martin (FF)	Jerry Buttimer (FG)	Pádraig Rice (SD)
