= Paschal Donohoe =

Irish politician (born 1974)

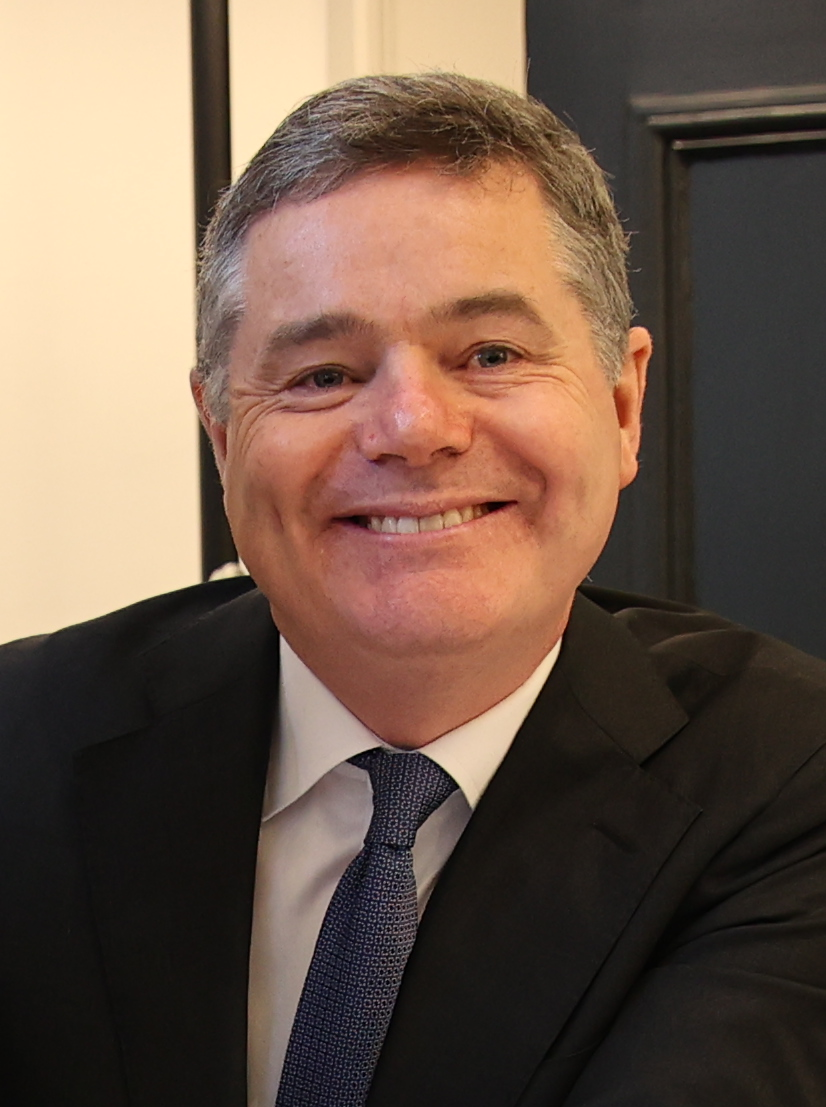
- Donohoe in 2024

Minister for Finance
- In office 23 January 2025 – 18 November 2025
- Taoiseach: Micheál Martin
- Preceded by: Jack Chambers
- Succeeded by: Simon Harris
- In office 14 June 2017 – 17 December 2022
- Taoiseach: Leo Varadkar; Micheál Martin
- Preceded by: Michael Noonan
- Succeeded by: Michael McGrath

Minister for Public Expenditure, NDP Delivery and Reform
- In office 17 December 2022 – 23 January 2025
- Taoiseach: Leo Varadkar; Simon Harris
- Preceded by: Michael McGrath
- Succeeded by: Jack Chambers
- In office 6 May 2016 – 27 June 2020
- Taoiseach: Enda Kenny; Leo Varadkar
- Preceded by: Brendan Howlin
- Succeeded by: Michael McGrath

President of the Eurogroup
- In office 13 July 2020 – 18 November 2025
- Preceded by: Mário Centeno
- Succeeded by: Kyriakos Pierrakakis

Minister for Transport, Tourism and Sport
- In office 11 July 2014 – 6 May 2016
- Taoiseach: Enda Kenny
- Preceded by: Leo Varadkar
- Succeeded by: Shane Ross

Minister of State
- 2013–2014: European Affairs

Teachta Dála
- In office 25 February 2011 – 21 November 2025
- Constituency: Dublin Central

Senator
- In office 13 September 2007 – 25 February 2011
- Constituency: Administrative Panel

Dublin City Councillor
- In office 2004–2007
- Constituency: Cabra-Glasnevin

Personal details
- Born: 19 September 1974 (age 52) Dublin, Ireland
- Party: Fine Gael
- Spouse: Justine Davey (m. 2001)
- Children: 2
- Education: Trinity College Dublin
- Website: paschaldonohoe.ie

Paschal Donohoe (born 19 September 1974) is an Irish economist and former Fine Gael politician who is currently serving as the managing director and chief knowledge officer at the World Bank, appointed in November 2025. He previously served in the Irish government from 2014 to 2025, most notably as Minister for Finance from 2017 to 2022 and from January to November 2025. He also served as President of the Eurogroup from July 2020 to November 2025. He was a Teachta Dála (TD) for Dublin Central from 2011 until November 2025. In November 2025, he resigned as Minister for Finance, President of the Eurogroup, and as a TD, to assume his position at the World Bank.

== Early life ==
Donohoe was born in Phibsborough, Dublin, in 1974 and grew up in Blanchardstown. He is the son of a Stena Line employee who also worked renting marquees and tents. He was educated at St. Declan's CBS in Cabra, before receiving a scholarship to Trinity College Dublin. He studied Politics and Economics as part of the Business, Economics and Social Science (BESS) degree programme and graduated with a first-class honours degree in 1996. While at Trinity, he served as Secretary of the University Philosophical Society, a debating and paper-reading society.

From Trinity College, Donohoe was selected by the UK division of multinational company Procter & Gamble for their fast-track graduate training programme. He spent six years working in the United Kingdom, becoming a sales and marketing director. In 2003, he returned to Ireland to pursue a career in politics.

== Political career ==
Donohoe was first elected at the 2004 Dublin City Council election for the local electoral area of Cabra–Glasnevin. During this time he was Chairperson of the Central Area Committee, Chairperson of the Environmental Strategic Policy Committee and a member of the City Corporate Policy Committee.

He was an unsuccessful candidate at the 2007 general election in the Dublin Central constituency, but was elected to Seanad Éireann as a Senator for the Administrative Panel in July 2007. He was appointed in October 2007, as Fine Gael Seanad Spokesperson on Transport and the Marine. He was a member of the Joint Oireachtas committee on Transport and the Joint Oireachtas committee on European Affairs.

He was appointed Chairman of the Joint Oireachtas Committee on Ireland's Future in Europe by Enda Kenny, in October 2008. He contested the 2009 Dublin Central by-election caused by the death of Tony Gregory, but he was unsuccessful. He topped the poll at the 2011 general election and was elected on the second count.

== In government ==
=== Minister of State for European Affairs (2013–2014) ===
Following the resignation of Lucinda Creighton, who had broken the government whip in a vote on the Protection of Life During Pregnancy Bill, Donohoe was appointed as Minister of State for European Affairs on 12 July 2013.

=== Minister for Transport, Tourism and Sport (2014–2016) ===
On 11 July 2014, Donohoe was promoted to the cabinet as Minister for Transport, Tourism and Sport, a position he held until 6 May 2016.

During his tenure he oversaw the sale of the Government's remaining 25% stake in Aer Lingus, to the International Airlines Group. He was also confronted with a series of strikes by Dublin Bus, Luas and Irish Rail workers.

=== Minister for Public Expenditure and Reform (2016–2020) ===
Donohoe was appointed Minister for Public Expenditure and Reform following the formation of a Fine Gael minority government in May 2016.

In the weeks leading up to his first budget in October 2016, Donohoe took over most of the workload from Minister for Finance Michael Noonan, who had been hospitalised for a period. Hopes of a budget splurge were quashed after Donohoe signalled Brexit and other world events would have "seismic consequences" on Ireland. On budget day he announced €58 billion in various day-to-day and capital expenditure which was an increase in €4 billion from the previous budget.

During his tenure as Minister for Public Expenditure and Reform, Donohoe dealt with a number of complex issues, including a threatened strike by the Garda Síochána. This resulted in a recommendation by the Labour Court and the decision not to proceed with industrial action by members of AGSI and the GRA.

Donohoe also negotiated a new national pay agreement for public servants, known as the Public Service Stability Agreement 2018–2020. This outlined a roadmap for the complete unwinding of the emergency legislation introduced during the financial crisis (FEMPI - Financial Emergency Measures in the Public Interest) as it affects, among other things, the remuneration of public servants and the pensions in payment of retired public servants.

Donohoe also formed part of the Government's negotiating team following the 2016 general election; this resulted in the formation of a minority Fine Gael government with Independents, underpinned by a confidence and supply agreement with the main opposition party Fianna Fáil.

His period as Minister for Public Expenditure and Reform ended on 27 June 2020, following the formation of the 32nd government led by Micheál Martin. He was succeeded by Michael McGrath.

=== Minister for Finance (2017–2022) ===
Following the appointment of Leo Varadkar as Taoiseach, Donohoe was appointed as Minister for Finance, taking office on 14 June 2017. On 10 October 2017, Donohoe presented his first budget as Minister for Finance.

Donohoe presided over public finance during a time when a budget surplus was recorded (in 2018) for the first time since the financial crisis (2006), marking a significant achievement for the Government.

Working with Cabinet colleagues, he engineered a new €116bn, 10-year National Development Plan which underpins Project Ireland 2040; a plan aimed at preparing for an Ireland with an additional one million residents and 660,000 more in employment. This also feeds into the Government's bid to increase Ireland's annual capital expenditure in line with EU norms. Budget 2019 saw an increase in capital expenditure by 25%, going from €5.7bn in 2018 to €7.2bn in 2019.

In both of his budgets as Minister for Finance, Donohoe decided to increase taxes in order to allow for increased spending. In Budget 2018, this was done by tripling the stamp duty rate on the sale of commercial property. The following year he reverted to the standard rate of VAT for the hospitality and services sector (going from 9% back up to 13.5%); a measure which had been introduced during the financial crisis in a bid to aid those sectors.

In 2018, Donohoe and Michael D'Arcy welcomed Ireland's issuing of its first green bond, making Ireland one of the first countries in the world to do so. During the same year, he also published Ireland's Roadmap on Corporation Tax (CT) taking stock of the changing international tax environment, outlining the actions Ireland has taken to date in the area of CT and the further actions to be taken over the coming years.

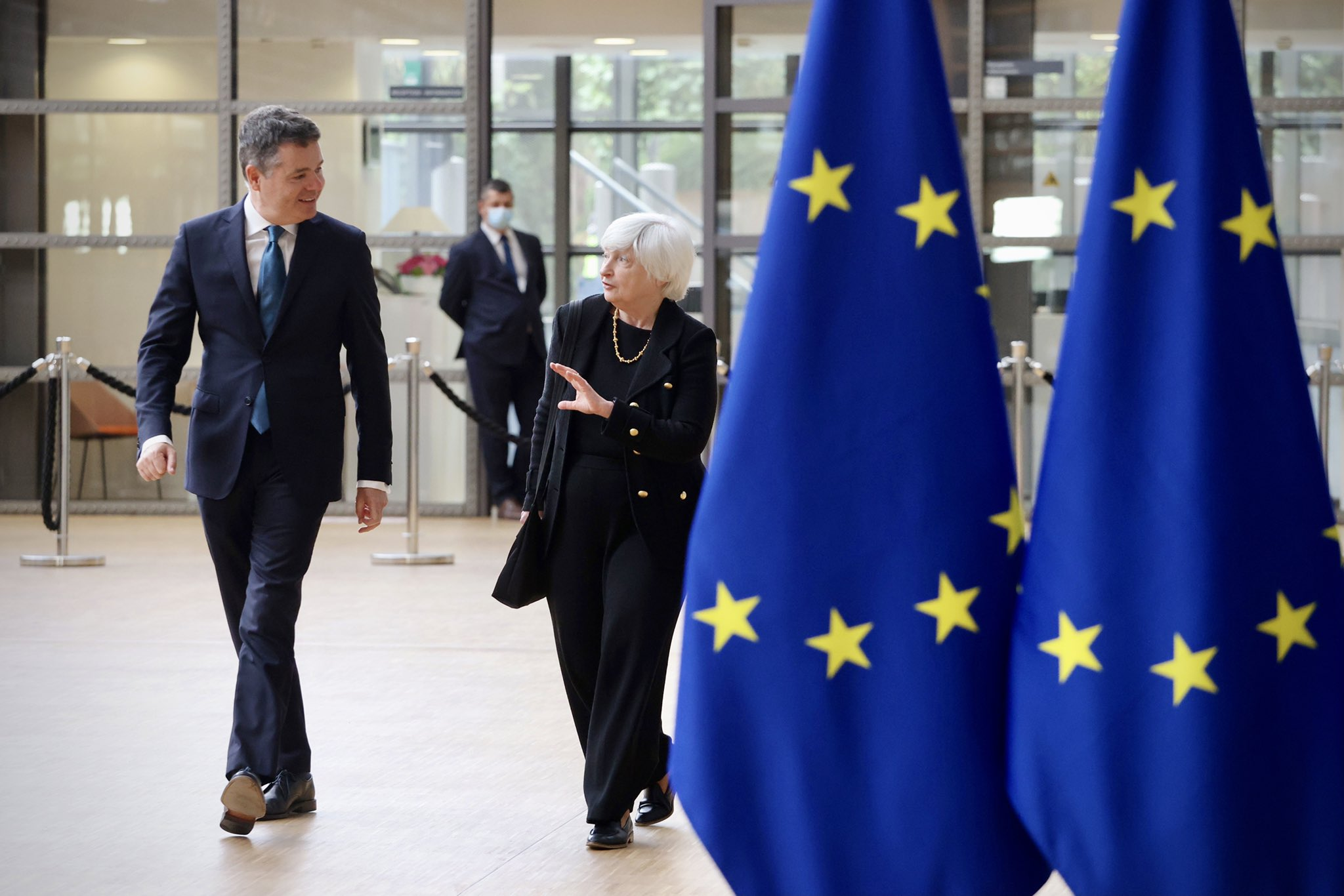
Donohoe meets with US Treasury Secretary Janet Yellen at the EU headquarters in 2021.

Donohoe is an opponent of the European Commission's Digital Services Tax, favouring a more globalised approach to the matter through the work of the OECD. He is a staunch defender of Ireland 12.5% corporation tax, which he reiterates will neither go up nor down under his Government's tenure, offering security to businesses in that regard. Donohoe attended the Davos World Economic Forum in 2018 and 2019.

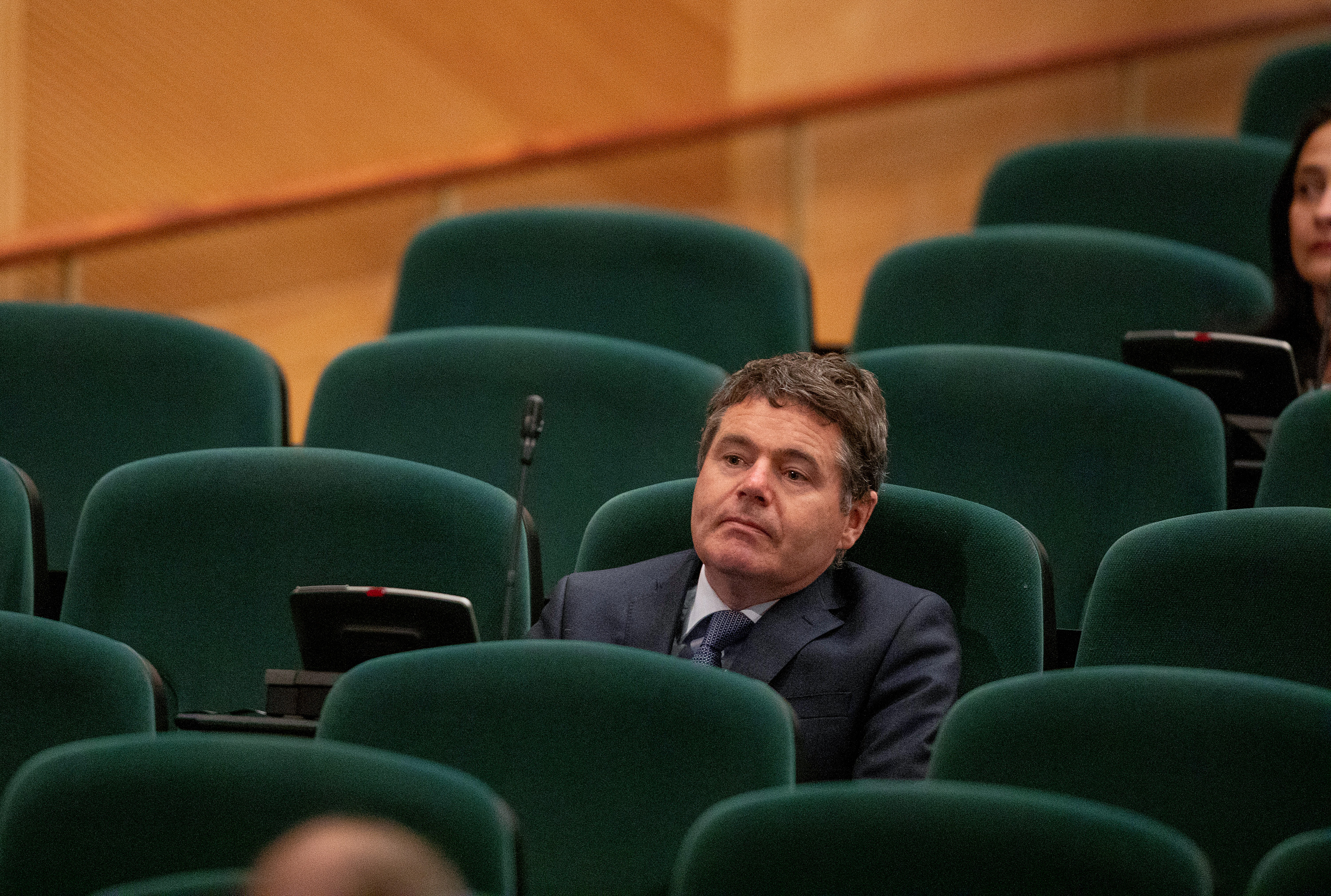
Donohoe takes his seat in the Convention Centre Dublin for the election of Micheál Martin as Taoiseach.

Following the appointment of Micheál Martin as Taoiseach, Donohoe was appointed for a second term as Minister for Finance on 27 June 2020.

=== Minister for Public Expenditure, NDP Delivery and Reform (2022–2025) ===
On 17 December 2022, after Leo Varadkar succeeded as Taoiseach in a rotation agreement with Micheál Martin, Donohoe was appointed as Minister for Public Expenditure, National Development Plan Delivery and Reform, while Michael McGrath was appointed as Minister for Finance.

In early January 2023, the Phoenix Magazine and the Irish Examiner revealed that Donohoe failed to properly declare a donation of services from a company in 2016. The Standards in Public Office Commission (SIPO) made a complaint against Donohoe, stating that the Designer Group engineering firm used two company vans and six employees to erect and later remove election posters for Donohoe in his Dublin Central constituency during the 2016 general election campaign. Donohoe denied these allegations and conducted a review of his election expenses statements on 14 January. The following day, he apologised for making incorrect declarations of election expenses and donations during his campaign and said he would recuse himself from any decision making around ethics legislation while the SIPO investigated him, but refused to resign as minister. The controversy intensified on 20 January when Donohoe identified a new issue over expenses following the 2020 general election.

At the 2024 general election, Donohoe was re-elected to the Dáil.

=== Minister for Finance (2025) ===
On 23 January 2025, Donohoe was appointed as Minister for Finance in the government led by Micheál Martin, following the 2024 general election. Donohoe resigned as Minister for Finance on 18 November 2025 to take up a position at the World Bank.

=== President of the Eurogroup ===
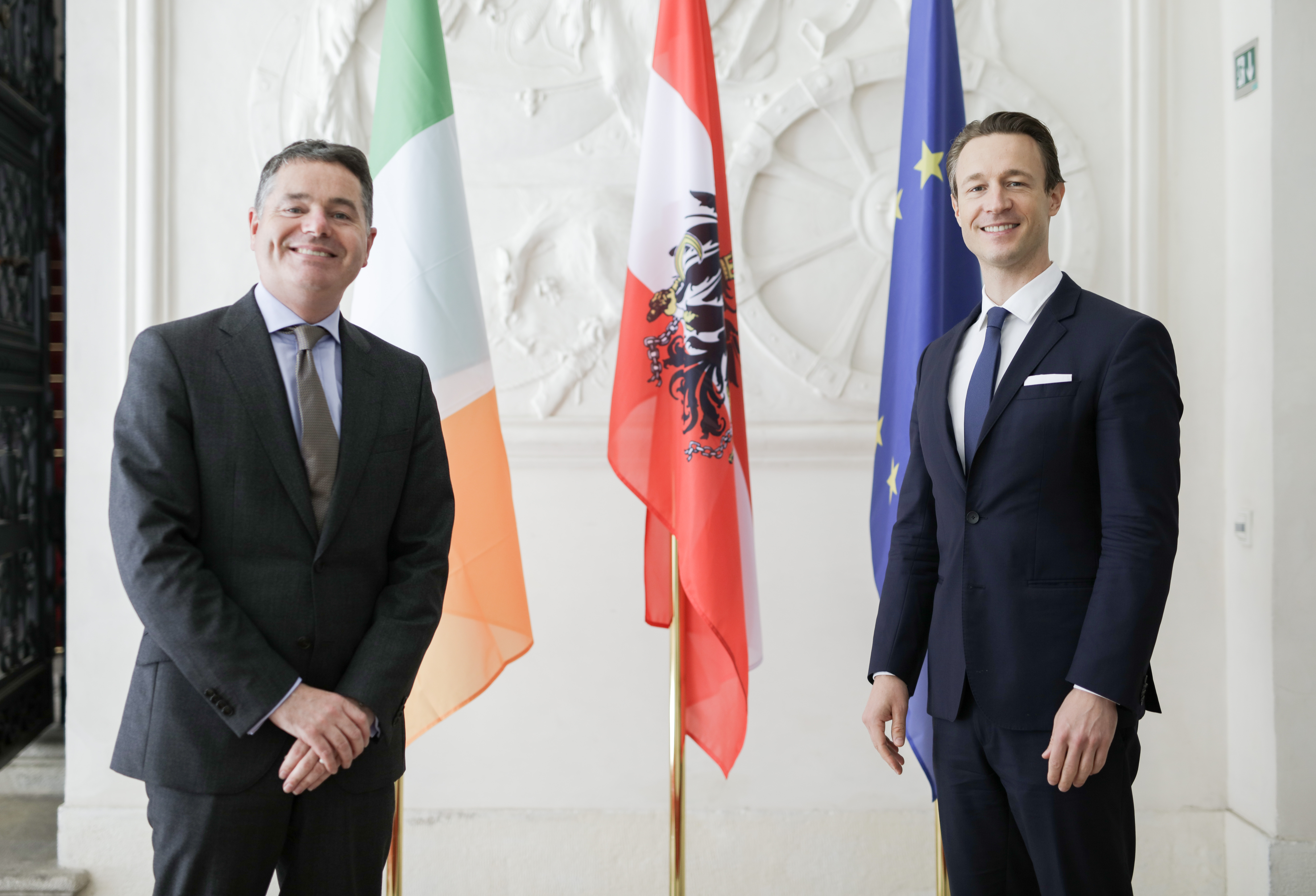
Donohoe and Austria's Finance Minister Gernot Blümel at a discussion event in 2020

On 9 July 2020, Donohoe was elected as President of the Eurogroup, succeeding Mário Centeno to take office on 13 July 2020. Donohoe is considered to have performed well as President of the Eurogroup by his European peers.

Donohoe's term as president was initially due to expire in January 2023. However, under the coalition agreement reached by Fianna Fáil, Fine Gael and the Green Party, Micheál Martin was due to resign as Taoiseach and be replaced by Leo Varadkar in December 2022, with Martin becoming Tánaiste in place of Varadkar. As part of this change of Taoiseach, a wider cabinet reshuffle was expected, with Michael McGrath of Fianna Fáil expected to become Minister for Finance in place of Donohoe, and Donohoe assuming McGrath's role as Minister for Public Expenditure and Reform. This would mean that McGrath, as Minister for Finance, would attend Eurogroup meetings on behalf of Ireland instead of Donohoe. Despite this, in November 2022, the Irish Government announced its intention to nominate Donohoe for a second term as President of the Eurogroup. If Donohoe was re-elected as president, this would result in two Irish ministers attending Eurogroup meetings; Donohoe attending as President of the Eurogroup (despite no longer being the national finance minister) and McGrath on behalf of Ireland as Minister for Finance.

On 5 December 2022, Donohoe was re-elected as President of the Eurogroup, beginning his second term on 13 January 2023. In June 2025 he again put forward his candidacy to the Eurogroup Presidency, together with Carlos Cuerpo and Rimantas Šadžius.

== Political profile and views ==
Across profiles such as in The Irish Times, RTÉ News, the Business Post, and The Phoenix, Paschal Donohoe is presented as a centrist, technocratic politician whose outlook is defined by fiscal prudence, institutional continuity, and incremental change. In March 2023, Donohoe told the Irish Examiner "I am a credible and committed centrist and I always have been, and always will be", and stated in November 2025 that "A centrist approach has been critical to the economic and social development of our country". Donohoe aligns with Fine Gael's centre-right economic tradition while accepting the welfare state as a permanent feature of Irish society. His decision-making style has been called cautious and risk-aware, favouring stability over dramatic reform. As early as 2016, Donohoe argued that Irish politics was entering an era of volatility, with minority governments and multi-party coalitions becoming normal, and predicted that politics would shift from a left-right axis to a contest between centrist forces advocating stability and radical actors seeking disruption.

In office, Donohoe's outlook translated into resistance to short-term populism. He opposed repeated one-off budget measures, argued in 2025 that tax cuts and VAT reductions risked overburdening the State, and insisted that the Apple tax windfall be placed in long-term "rainy day" funds. Donohoe's fiscal conservatism earned him the moniker of "Prudent Paschal", although this stance has been called pragmatic rather than doctrinaire. During the COVID-19 crisis in 2020, Donohoe rapidly expanded public spending, introducing supports for workers and businesses, treating emergency intervention as compatible with long-term discipline when systemic collapse was at stake.

Commentators also depict him as managerial and non-confrontational, lacking a distinct ideological project beyond moderation, competence, and ethical propriety. Donohoe is portrayed as reluctant to challenge entrenched interests or engage in political combat, preferring consensus, procedure, and credibility, particularly within European and global economic institutions. His politics have been described as those of a steward rather than a reformer: focused on managing risk, maintaining confidence, and preserving stability in a volatile environment, rather than using the office as a vehicle for structural or ideological transformation.

== Personal life ==
Donohoe married British-born Justine Davey in 2001. They have a son and a daughter. During Donohoe's political career, the family lived in Phibsborough.

== Other ==
Donohoe regularly writes book reviews for The Irish Times and other publications.

Political offices
Preceded by Lucinda Creighton	Minister of State for European Affairs; 2013–2014	Succeeded by Dara Murphy
Preceded by Leo Varadkar	Minister for Transport, Tourism and Sport; 2014–2016	Succeeded by Shane Ross
Preceded by Brendan Howlin	Minister for Public Expenditure and Reform; 2016–2020	Succeeded by Michael McGrath
Preceded by Michael Noonan	Minister for Finance; 2017–2022	Succeeded by Michael McGrath
Preceded by Michael McGrath as Minister for Public Expenditure and Reform	Minister for Public Expenditure, NDP Delivery and Reform; 2022–2025	Succeeded by Jack Chambers as Minister for Public Expenditure, Infrastructure, Public Services, Reform and Digitalisation
Preceded by Jack Chambers	Minister for Finance; 2025	Succeeded by Simon Harris
Diplomatic posts
Preceded by Mário Centeno	President of the Eurogroup; 2020–2025	Succeeded by Makis Keravnos

Dáil	Election	Deputy (Party)	Deputy (Party)	Deputy (Party)	Deputy (Party)
19th	1969	Frank Cluskey (Lab)	Vivion de Valera (FF)	Thomas J. Fitzpatrick (FF)	Maurice E. Dockrell (FG)
20th	1973	Frank Cluskey (Lab)	Vivion de Valera (FF)	Thomas J. Fitzpatrick (FF)	Maurice E. Dockrell (FG)
21st	1977	Constituency abolished			

Dáil	Election	Deputy (Party)	Deputy (Party)	Deputy (Party)	Deputy (Party)	Deputy (Party)
22nd	1981	Bertie Ahern (FF)	Michael Keating (FG)	Alice Glenn (FG)	Michael O'Leary (Lab)	George Colley (FF)
23rd	1982 (Feb)	Bertie Ahern (FF)	Michael Keating (FG)	Tony Gregory (Ind.)	Michael O'Leary (Lab)	George Colley (FF)
24th	1982 (Nov)	Bertie Ahern (FF)	Michael Keating (FG)	Tony Gregory (Ind.)	Alice Glenn (FG)	George Colley (FF)
24th	1983 by-election	Bertie Ahern (FF)	Michael Keating (FG)	Tony Gregory (Ind.)	Alice Glenn (FG)	Tom Leonard (FF)
25th	1987	Bertie Ahern (FF)	Michael Keating (PDs)	Tony Gregory (Ind.)	Dermot Fitzpatrick (FF)	John Stafford (FF)
26th	1989	Bertie Ahern (FF)	Pat Lee (FG)	Tony Gregory (Ind.)	Dermot Fitzpatrick (FF)	John Stafford (FF)
27th	1992	Bertie Ahern (FF)	Jim Mitchell (FG)	Tony Gregory (Ind.)	Joe Costello (Lab)	4 seats 1992–2016
28th	1997	Bertie Ahern (FF)	Jim Mitchell (FG)	Tony Gregory (Ind.)	Marian McGennis (FF)	4 seats 1992–2016
29th	2002	Bertie Ahern (FF)	Dermot Fitzpatrick (FF)	Tony Gregory (Ind.)	Joe Costello (Lab)	4 seats 1992–2016
30th	2007	Bertie Ahern (FF)	Cyprian Brady (FF)	Tony Gregory (Ind.)	Joe Costello (Lab)	4 seats 1992–2016
30th	2009 by-election	Bertie Ahern (FF)	Cyprian Brady (FF)	Maureen O'Sullivan (Ind.)	Joe Costello (Lab)	4 seats 1992–2016
31st	2011	Mary Lou McDonald (SF)	Paschal Donohoe (FG)	Maureen O'Sullivan (Ind.)	Joe Costello (Lab)	4 seats 1992–2016
32nd	2016	Mary Lou McDonald (SF)	Paschal Donohoe (FG)	Maureen O'Sullivan (Ind.)	3 seats 2016–2020	
33rd	2020	Mary Lou McDonald (SF)	Paschal Donohoe (FG)	Gary Gannon (SD)	Neasa Hourigan (GP)	4 seats from 2020
34th	2024	Mary Lou McDonald (SF)	Paschal Donohoe (FG)	Gary Gannon (SD)	Marie Sherlock (Lab)	4 seats from 2020
34th	2026 by-election	Mary Lou McDonald (SF)	Daniel Ennis (SD)	Gary Gannon (SD)	Marie Sherlock (Lab)	4 seats from 2020
