= Minister for Public Expenditure, Infrastructure, Public Service Reform and Digitalisation =

Irish government cabinet minister

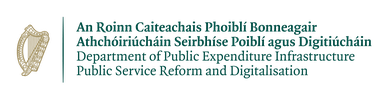

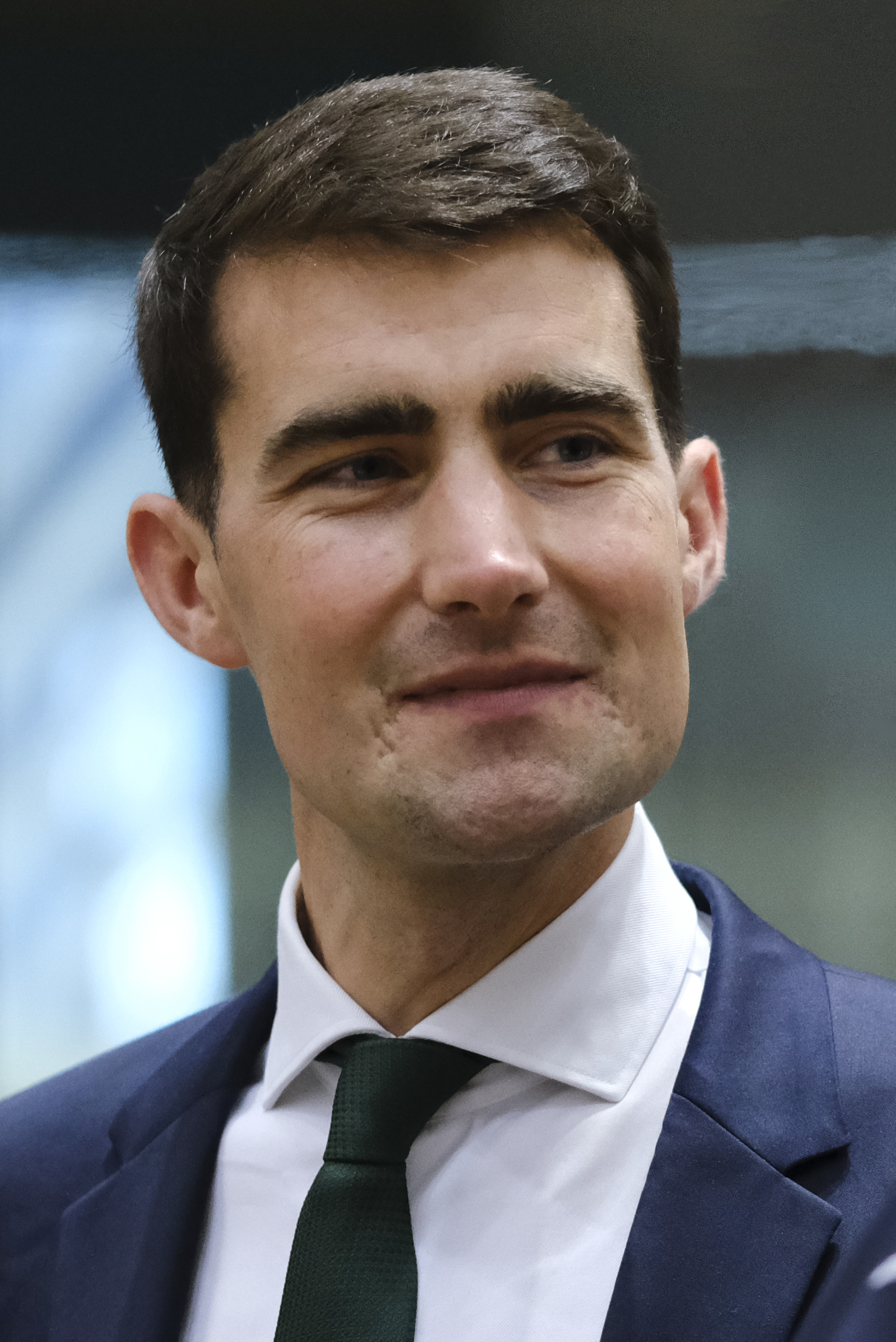
- Incumbent; Jack Chambers since 23 January 2025
- Department of Public Expenditure, Infrastructure, Public Service Reform and Digitalisation
- Type: Finance minister; Infrastructure minister
- Status: Cabinet minister
- Member of: Government of Ireland; Council of the European Union; Dáil Éireann
- Reports to: Taoiseach
- Seat: Dublin, Ireland
- Nominator: Taoiseach
- Appointer: President of Ireland; (on the advice of the Taoiseach)
- Inaugural holder: Brendan Howlin
- Formation: 6 July 2011
- Salary: €210,750 (2025) (including €115,953 TD salary)
- Website: Official website

The minister for public expenditure, infrastructure, public service reform and digitalisation (Irish: An tAire Caiteachais Phoiblí, Bonneagair, Athchóiriúcháin Seirbhíse Poiblí agus Digitiúcháin) is a senior minister in the Government of Ireland and leads the Department of Public Expenditure, Infrastructure, Public Service Reform and Digitalisation.

The minister for public expenditure, infrastructure, public service reform and digitalisation since January 2025 is Jack Chambers, TD.

He is assisted by two ministers of state:

- Kevin "Boxer" Moran, TD – Minister of State for the Office of Public Works; and
- Emer Higgins, TD – Minister of State for public procurement, digitalisation and eGovernment.

The office was created in July 2011, taking over some of the functions of the minister for finance.

== List of ministers ==
=== Minister for Public Expenditure and Reform 2011–2023 ===
Name	Term of office		Party	Government(s)
Brendan Howlin	9 March 2011 (Note: Howlin was a minister without portfolio from 9 March 2011 to 6 July 2011 before the department was formally established.)	6 May 2016	Labour	29th
Paschal Donohoe (Note: Also Minister for Finance from 14 June 2017 to 17 December 2022.)	6 May 2016	27 June 2020	Fine Gael	30th • 31st
Michael McGrath	27 June 2020	17 December 2022	Fianna Fáil	32nd
=== Minister for Public Expenditure, National Development Plan Delivery and Reform 2023–2025 ===
Name	Term of office		Party	Government
Paschal Donohoe	17 December 2022	23 January 2025	Fine Gael	33rd • 34th
=== Minister for Public Expenditure, Infrastructure, Public Service Reform and Digitalisation 2025–present ===
Name	Term of office		Party	Government
Jack Chambers	23 January 2025	Incumbent	Fianna Fáil	35th
