= Minister for Finance (Ireland) =

Irish government cabinet minister

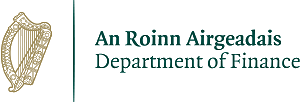

- Incumbent; Simon Harris since 18 November 2025
- Department of Finance
- Type: Finance minister
- Status: Cabinet minister
- Member of: Government of Ireland; Council of the European Union; Eurogroup; Dáil Éireann
- Reports to: Taoiseach
- Seat: Dublin, Ireland
- Nominator: Taoiseach
- Appointer: President of Ireland; (on the advice of the Taoiseach)
- Inaugural holder: Eoin MacNeill
- Formation: 22 January 1919
- Salary: €210,750 (2025) (including €115,953 TD salary)
- Website: Official website

The minister for finance (Irish: An tAire Airgeadais) is a senior minister in the Government of Ireland. The minister for finance leads the Department of Finance and is responsible for all financial and monetary matters of the state; and is considered the second most important member of the Government of Ireland, after the Taoiseach.

The current office holder is Simon Harris, TD; he is assisted by one minister of state, Robert Troy, TD.

== Overview ==
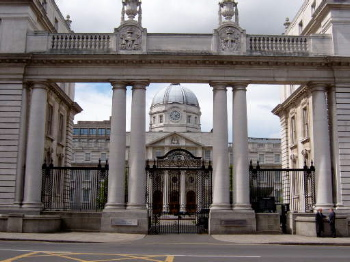
Government Buildings, Dublin, is the location of the Department of Finance

The minister for finance holds the second most important ministerial position in the Irish Cabinet after that of the Taoiseach. The minister is responsible for all financial matters in Ireland. For this reason, the minister for finance is one of three positions in the government which the Constitution requires to be held by a member of Dáil Éireann, the other two being Taoiseach and Tánaiste. Ministers for finance who later became Taoiseach include Jack Lynch, Charles Haughey, Albert Reynolds, John Bruton, Bertie Ahern, and Brian Cowen.

The department and minister are occasionally called the Irish Exchequer (or simply the Exchequer), a term previously used under the Chancellor of the Exchequer of Ireland (disestablished in 1817).

=== Budget ===
One of the most important aspects of the minister's work is the creation of the annual budget which is delivered to the Dáil in a speech, which must be given before 15 October due to the Two-Pack agreement. In the budget, the minister details the government's spending programme for the coming year. The budget consists of:

- a financial statement to the Dáil,
- Budgetary measures (a list of budgetary changes detailing the cost/yield of same),
- Budget statistics, and
- financial resolutions.

== Minister for Finance since 1919 ==
Denotes acting minister for finance

Name	Term of office		Party	Government(s) (Note: Before 1937: DM – Dáil Ministry; PG – Provisional Government; EC – Executive Council.)
Eoin MacNeill	22 January 1919	1 April 1919	Sinn Féin	1st DM
Michael Collins	2 April 1919	22 August 1922	Sinn Féin	2nd DM • 3rd DM • 4th DM • 1st PG
W. T. Cosgrave (acting)	17 July 1922	21 September 1923	Pro-Treaty Sinn Féin	1st PG • 2nd PG • 5th DM • 1st EC
Ernest Blythe	21 September 1923	9 March 1932	Cumann na nGaedheal	2nd EC • 3rd EC • 4th EC • 5th EC
Seán MacEntee	9 March 1932	16 September 1939	Fianna Fáil	6th EC • 7th EC • 8th EC • 1st • 2nd
Seán T. O'Kelly	16 September 1939	14 June 1945	Fianna Fáil	2nd • 3rd • 4th
Frank Aiken	19 June 1945	18 February 1948	Fianna Fáil	4th
Patrick McGilligan	18 February 1948	13 June 1951	Fine Gael	5th
Seán MacEntee	13 June 1951	2 June 1954	Fianna Fáil	6th
Gerard Sweetman	2 June 1954	20 March 1957	Fine Gael	7th
James Ryan	20 March 1957	21 April 1965	Fianna Fáil	8th • 9th • 10th
Jack Lynch	21 April 1965	10 November 1966	Fianna Fáil	11th
Charles Haughey	10 November 1966	7 May 1970	Fianna Fáil	12th • 13th
George Colley	9 May 1970	14 March 1973	Fianna Fáil	13th
Richie Ryan (Note: Also Minister for the Public Service from 1 November 1973, on the creation of the new department.)	14 March 1973	5 July 1977	Fine Gael	14th
George Colley (Note: Also Minister for the Public Service.)	5 July 1977	11 December 1979	Fianna Fáil	15th
Michael O'Kennedy	12 December 1979	16 December 1980	Fianna Fáil	16th
Gene Fitzgerald	16 December 1980	30 June 1981	Fianna Fáil	16th
John Bruton	30 June 1981	9 March 1982	Fine Gael	17th
Ray MacSharry	9 March 1982	14 December 1982	Fianna Fáil	18th
Alan Dukes	14 December 1982	14 February 1986	Fine Gael	19th
John Bruton (Note: Also Minister for the Public Service from 20 January to 20 March 1987, after the resignation of the Labour Party ministers from government.)	14 February 1986	10 March 1987	Fine Gael	19th
Ray MacSharry (Note: Also Minister for the Public Service until 20 March 1987, when the functions of the department were transferred to the Department of Finance.)	10 March 1987	24 November 1988	Fianna Fáil	20th
Albert Reynolds	24 November 1988	7 November 1991	Fianna Fáil	20th • 21st
Charles Haughey (acting)	7 November 1991	14 November 1991	Fianna Fáil	21st
Bertie Ahern	14 November 1991	15 December 1994	Fianna Fáil	21st • 22nd • 23rd
Ruairi Quinn	15 December 1994	26 June 1997	Labour	24th
Charlie McCreevy	26 June 1997	29 September 2004	Fianna Fáil	25th • 26th
Brian Cowen	29 September 2004	7 May 2008	Fianna Fáil	26th • 27th
Brian Lenihan	7 May 2008	9 March 2011	Fianna Fáil	28th
Michael Noonan	9 March 2011	14 June 2017	Fine Gael	29th • 30th
Paschal Donohoe (Note: Minister for Public Expenditure and Reform from 6 May 2016 to 27 June 2020.)	14 June 2017	17 December 2022	Fine Gael	31st • 32nd
Michael McGrath (Note: Minister for Public Expenditure and Reform from 27 June 2020 to 17 December 2022.)	17 December 2022	26 June 2024	Fianna Fáil	33rd • 34th
Jack Chambers	26 June 2024	23 January 2025	Fianna Fáil	34th
Paschal Donohoe	23 January 2025	18 November 2025	Fine Gael	35th
Simon Harris	18 November 2025	Incumbent	Fine Gael	35th

== See also ==
- National Lottery
- Revenue Commissioners
