= Robert Troy =

Irish politician (born 1982)

Robert Troy TD
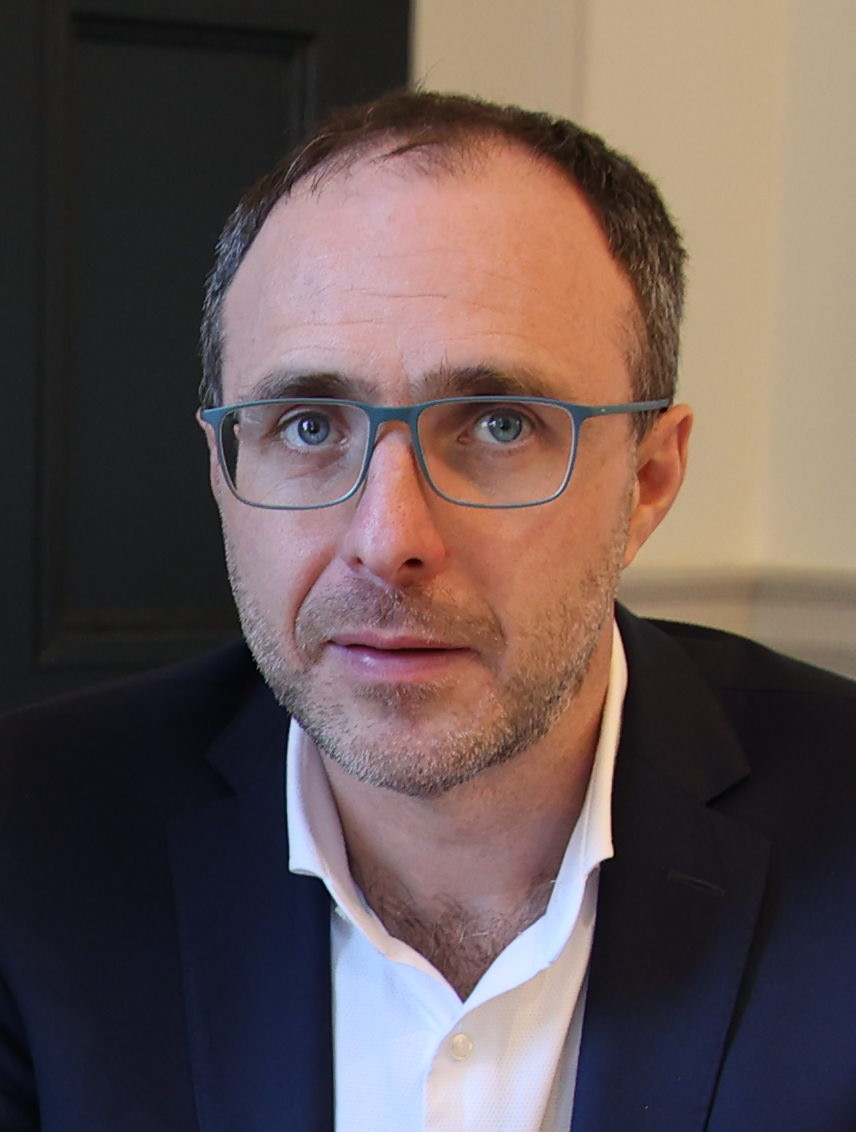
- Troy in 2024

Minister of State
- 2025–: Finance
- 2020–2022: Enterprise, Trade and Employment

Teachta Dála
- Incumbent
- Assumed office February 2011
- Constituency: Longford–Westmeath

Personal details
- Born: 24 January 1982 (age 44) Mullingar, County Westmeath, Ireland
- Party: Fianna Fáil
- Education: Dublin Business School
- Website: roberttroy.ie

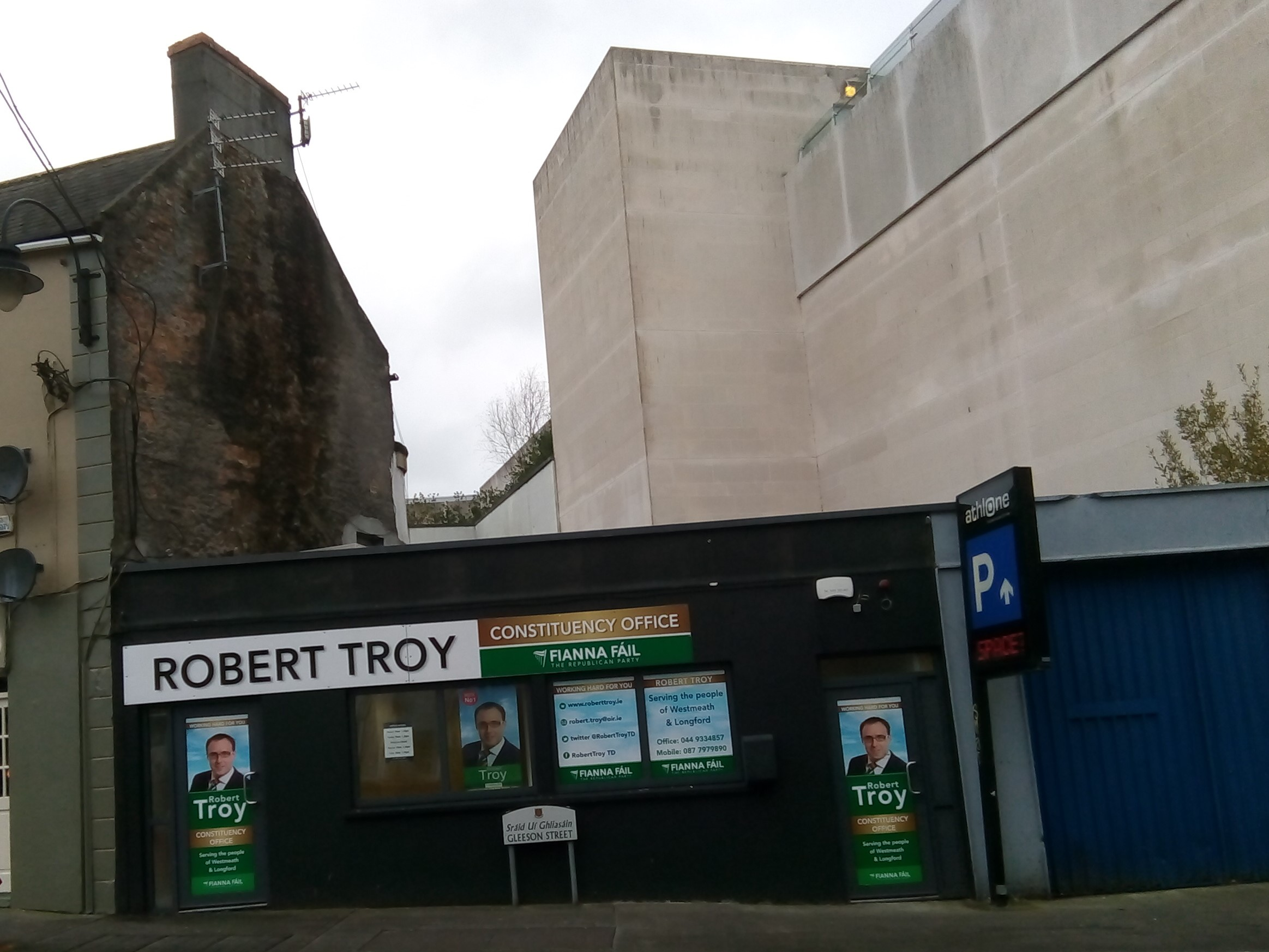
Constituency office, Athlone

Robert Troy (born 24 January 1982) is an Irish Fianna Fáil politician who has been a Teachta Dála (TD) for the Longford–Westmeath constituency since 2011. He has been a minister of state since January 2025. He served as minister of state from 2020 to 2022, resigning after failing to declare property interests.

== Biography ==
Troy was born in Mullingar in 1982, but is a native of Ballynacargy, County Westmeath. He attended Emper National School and boarded at St Finian's College, Mullingar, and was on the committee of National Youth Council of Ireland. He subsequently completed a certificate in marketing at the Dublin Business School.

Troy was elected to Westmeath County Council in 2004, and re-elected in 2009. He was elected as a TD for the Longford–Westmeath constituency at the 2011 general election, beating the two sitting Fianna Fáil TDs, Peter Kelly and former cabinet Minister and Leader of the Seanad Mary O'Rourke.

Troy was the Fianna Fáil Spokesperson on Arts and Heritage from April 2011 to July 2012, when he was appointed as Spokesperson on Children. Following the 2016 general election he was appointed Fianna Fáil Spokesperson on Transport, Tourism and Sport.

== Minister of State ==
From July 2020 to August 2022 he served as Minister of State at the Department of Enterprise, Trade and Employment with special responsibility for trade promotion. He resigned following revelations about his failure to declare property interests.

In August 2022, online news platform The Ditch reported that Troy had failed to declare his full business interests in the Register of Members Interests in line with the standard obligations of a TD. It was discovered that he had sold a property to Westmeath County Council, of which he was previously a member, in 2018. Troy claimed that this failure was an error on his part.

It was later discovered that Troy had failed to register the sale of a second property to Longford County Council in 2019, and failed to declare an interest in a third house in Mullingar in 2020. It subsequently emerged in an RTÉ interview on 23 August 2022 that in all, he had 11 properties, nine of which he was renting out; he admitted he had failed to properly declare a property business he was involved in; and he was in receipt of income under the state-funded Rental Accommodation Scheme (RAS) for two properties. Around this time Troy had also spoken about increasing funding for that scheme.

On 24 August, it was revealed that one of Troy's rental properties had no fire certificate. Later on 24 August, Troy resigned as a minister of state, insisting he had made genuine errors with his statutory declaration while saying he would not apologise for being a landlord. In a lengthy statement, he accepted the issue had now become a distraction for the coalition and the work his party was doing in the housing portfolio. He also criticised media coverage of the controversy. He said "I personally will not apologise for being a landlord. I bought my first house at the age of 20 as I went straight into a job after school, so I was in a position to purchase my first property then. I am not a person of privilege and I have not been brought up with a silver spoon in my mouth, I have worked for all I have."

An investigation by Standards in Public Office Commission found that the failure to declare some of Troy's interests was accidental, however his obligation to make these declarations were inadvertently but negligently breached.

In January 2025, he was appointed as Minister of State at the Department of Finance with responsibility for financial services, credit unions and insurance. In March 2025 in the Dáil Éireann Register of Interests, he declared income as a landlord from eight properties in Phibsborough in Dublin, and Mullingar and Ballynacargy in Westmeath.

Political offices
Preceded by Pat Breen; John Halligan as Ministers of State at the Department of Business, Enterprise and Innovation	Minister of State at the Department of Enterprise, Trade and Employment; 2020–2022; With: Damien English	Succeeded by Damien English; Dara Calleary
Preceded by Neale Richmond	Minister of State at the Department of Finance; 2025–	Incumbent

Dáil	Election	Deputy (Party)	Deputy (Party)	Deputy (Party)	Deputy (Party)	Deputy (Party)
2nd	1921	Lorcan Robbins (SF)	Seán Mac Eoin (SF)	Joseph McGuinness (SF)	Laurence Ginnell (SF)	4 seats 1921–1923
3rd	1922	John Lyons (Lab)	Seán Mac Eoin (PT-SF)	Francis McGuinness (PT-SF)	Laurence Ginnell (AT-SF)	4 seats 1921–1923
4th	1923	John Lyons (Ind.)	Conor Byrne (Rep)	James Killane (Rep)	Patrick Shaw (CnaG)	Patrick McKenna (FP)
5th	1927 (Jun)	Henry Broderick (Lab)	Michael Kennedy (FF)	James Victory (FF)	Patrick Shaw (CnaG)	Hugh Garahan (FP)
6th	1927 (Sep)	Henry Broderick (Lab)	Michael Kennedy (FF)	James Killane (FF)	Patrick Shaw (CnaG)	Michael Connolly (CnaG)
6th	1930 by-election	Henry Broderick (Lab)	Michael Kennedy (FF)	James Geoghegan (FF)	Patrick Shaw (CnaG)	Michael Connolly (CnaG)
7th	1932	Francis Gormley (FF)	Michael Kennedy (FF)	James Geoghegan (FF)	Patrick Shaw (CnaG)	Seán Mac Eoin (CnaG)
8th	1933	James Victory (FF)	Michael Kennedy (FF)	James Geoghegan (FF)	Charles Fagan (NCP)	Seán Mac Eoin (CnaG)
9th	1937	Constituency abolished. See Athlone–Longford and Meath–Westmeath				

Dáil	Election	Deputy (Party)	Deputy (Party)	Deputy (Party)	Deputy (Party)	Deputy (Party)
13th	1948	Erskine H. Childers (FF)	Thomas Carter (FF)	Michael Kennedy (FF)	Seán Mac Eoin (FG)	Charles Fagan (Ind.)
14th	1951	Erskine H. Childers (FF)	Frank Carter (FF)	Michael Kennedy (FF)	Seán Mac Eoin (FG)	Charles Fagan (Ind.)
15th	1954	Erskine H. Childers (FF)	Frank Carter (FF)	Michael Kennedy (FF)	Seán Mac Eoin (FG)	Charles Fagan (FG)
16th	1957	Erskine H. Childers (FF)	Ruairí Ó Brádaigh (SF)	Michael Kennedy (FF)	Seán Mac Eoin (FG)	Charles Fagan (FG)
17th	1961	Frank Carter (FF)	Joe Sheridan (Ind.)	Michael Kennedy (FF)	Seán Mac Eoin (FG)	4 seats 1961–1992
18th	1965	Frank Carter (FF)	Joe Sheridan (Ind.)	Patrick Lenihan (FF)	Gerry L'Estrange (FG)	4 seats 1961–1992
19th	1969	Frank Carter (FF)	Joe Sheridan (Ind.)	Patrick Lenihan (FF)	Gerry L'Estrange (FG)	4 seats 1961–1992
19th	1970 by-election	Frank Carter (FF)	Joe Sheridan (Ind.)	Patrick Cooney (FG)	Gerry L'Estrange (FG)	4 seats 1961–1992
20th	1973	Frank Carter (FF)	Joe Sheridan (Ind.)	Patrick Cooney (FG)	Gerry L'Estrange (FG)	4 seats 1961–1992
21st	1977	Albert Reynolds (FF)	Joe Sheridan (Ind.)	Seán Keegan (FF)	Gerry L'Estrange (FG)	4 seats 1961–1992
22nd	1981	Albert Reynolds (FF)	Patrick Cooney (FG)	Seán Keegan (FF)	Gerry L'Estrange (FG)	4 seats 1961–1992
23rd	1982 (Feb)	Albert Reynolds (FF)	Patrick Cooney (FG)	Seán Keegan (FF)	Gerry L'Estrange (FG)	4 seats 1961–1992
24th	1982 (Nov)	Albert Reynolds (FF)	Patrick Cooney (FG)	Mary O'Rourke (FF)	Gerry L'Estrange (FG)	4 seats 1961–1992
25th	1987	Albert Reynolds (FF)	Patrick Cooney (FG)	Mary O'Rourke (FF)	Henry Abbott (FF)	4 seats 1961–1992
26th	1989	Albert Reynolds (FF)	Louis Belton (FG)	Mary O'Rourke (FF)	Paul McGrath (FG)	4 seats 1961–1992
27th	1992	Constituency abolished. See Longford–Roscommon and Westmeath				

Dáil	Election	Deputy (Party)	Deputy (Party)	Deputy (Party)	Deputy (Party)	Deputy (Party)
30th	2007	Willie Penrose (Lab)	Peter Kelly (FF)	Mary O'Rourke (FF)	James Bannon (FG)	4 seats 2007–2024
31st	2011	Willie Penrose (Lab)	Robert Troy (FF)	Nicky McFadden (FG)	James Bannon (FG)	4 seats 2007–2024
31st	2014 by-election	Willie Penrose (Lab)	Robert Troy (FF)	Gabrielle McFadden (FG)	James Bannon (FG)	4 seats 2007–2024
32nd	2016	Willie Penrose (Lab)	Robert Troy (FF)	Kevin "Boxer" Moran (Ind.)	Peter Burke (FG)	4 seats 2007–2024
33rd	2020	Sorca Clarke (SF)	Robert Troy (FF)	Joe Flaherty (FF)	Peter Burke (FG)	4 seats 2007–2024
34th	2024	Sorca Clarke (SF)	Robert Troy (FF)	Kevin "Boxer" Moran (Ind.)	Peter Burke (FG)	Micheál Carrigy (FG)
