= Ged Nash =

Irish politician (born 1975)

Ged Nash TD
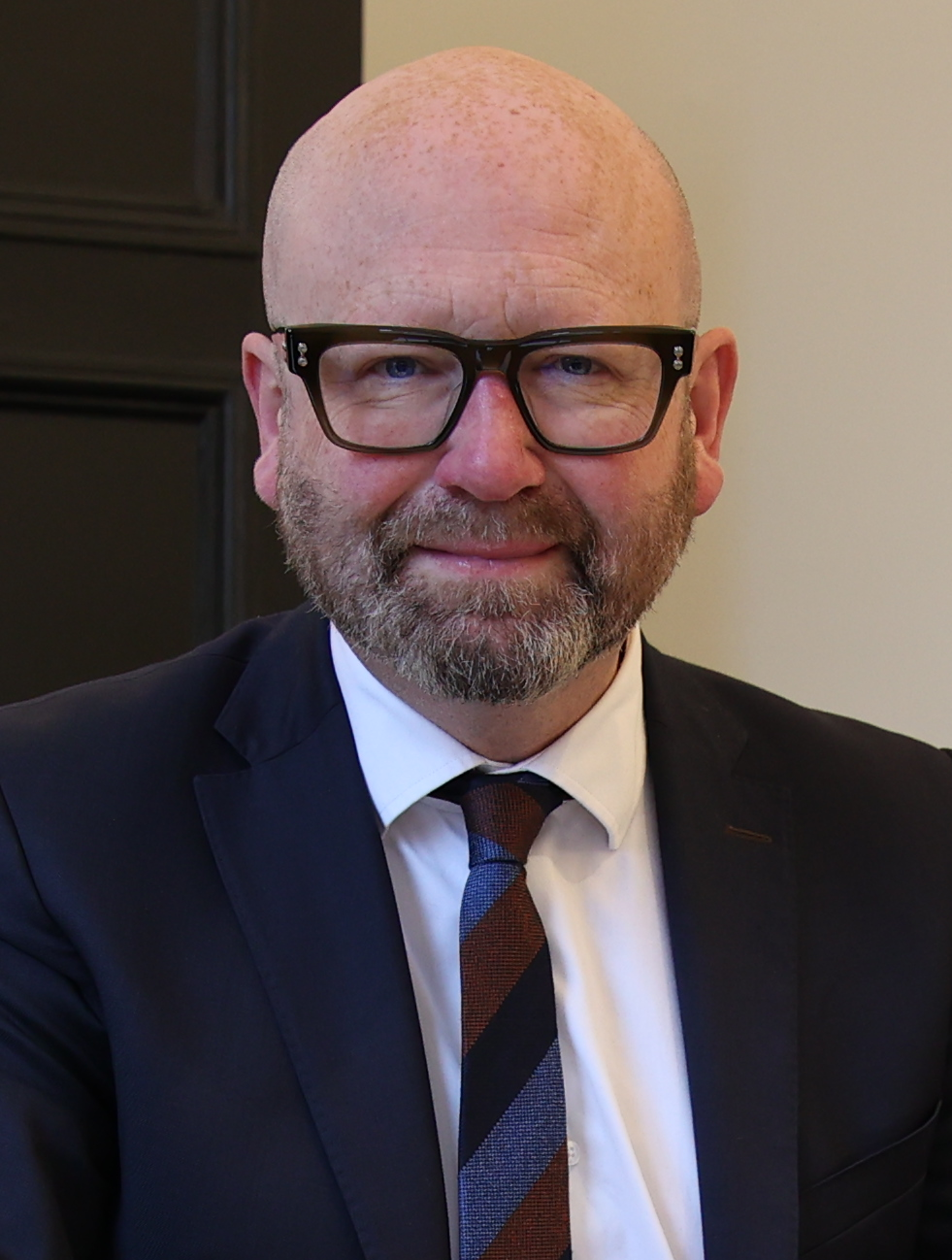
- Nash in 2024

Minister of State
- 2014–2016: Jobs, Enterprise and Innovation

Teachta Dála
- Incumbent
- Assumed office February 2020
- In office February 2011 – February 2016
- Constituency: Louth

Senator
- In office 8 June 2016 – 8 February 2020
- Constituency: Labour Panel

Personal details
- Born: Gerald Henry Nash; 7 December 1975 (age 50) Drogheda, County Louth, Ireland
- Party: Labour Party
- Education: University College Dublin

Gerald Henry Nash (born 7 December 1975) is an Irish Labour Party politician who has been a Teachta Dála (TD) for the Louth constituency since 2020, and previously from 2011 to 2016.

Nash became a member of Drogheda Borough Council in 2000 and Louth County Council in 2002, serving on both until his election to the Dáil in 2011. He served as Minister of State for Business and Employment from 2014 to 2016. After losing his seat at the 2016 general election, Nash was elected to the Seanad and was a Senator for the Labour Panel from 2016 to 2020. He was re-elected to the Dáil in 2020.

== Early life ==
Nash was born on 7 December 1975. His father was a union representative in a factory and active in the Labour Party. He attended St. Joseph's CBS, Drogheda and graduated with a bachelor's degree in politics and history from University College Dublin.

Before entering politics, Nash was a public relations consultant to trade unions and the not-for-profit sector, running the PR firm McCormack Nash in Drogheda. He also worked as the manager of the Upstate Theatre Project company in Drogheda, as a teacher in St. Oliver's Community College in Drogheda and as an advisor to Nessa Childers during her tenure in the European Parliament.

== Political career ==
Nash joined the Labour Party as a student in University College Dublin. He is a former National Secretary of Labour Youth. During the 2002 referendum on the Treaty of Nice, Nash was part of Drogheda Young Alliance for Yes, an interparty group which called for a "Yes" vote.

=== Councillor and mayor of Drogheda (2000–2011) ===
Nash was co-opted onto Drogheda Borough Council in 2000 to replace retiring councillor Patsy Kirwan, and served on the council until 2011. He was a member of Louth County Council for the local electoral area of Drogheda from 2002 to 2011, serving as mayor of Drogheda from 2004 to 2005.

Nash contested the 2007 general election in the Louth constituency but was not elected, receiving 2,739 votes (4.98% of the vote).

=== Dáil Éireann (2011–2016) ===
He was elected as a Labour Party TD for the Louth constituency at the 2011 general election. He lost his seat at the 2016 general election.

==== Minister of State ====
In July 2014, he was appointed as Minister of State at the Department of Jobs, Enterprise and Innovation, with responsibility for small and medium business, collective bargaining and low pay commission. He attended cabinet meetings as a non-voting member, a position described as a Super Junior Minister.

While a Minister of State, Nash commissioned the first major independent study of zero and low-hour contracts in the Irish labour market. The research was carried out by the University of Limerick and published in November 2015.

=== Seanad Éireann (2016–2020) ===
In April 2016, Nash was elected to Seanad Éireann on the Labour Panel. Party leader Brendan Howlin appointed him as Labour Party Spokesperson on Equality, and Labour Affairs and Workers Rights. As of October 2023, Nash is Labour's party spokesperson on finance.

In 2018, Nash put forward a bill to issue an apology to men who had been convicted of homosexual offences prior to its decriminalisation in 1993. The motion received all-party support, and Taoiseach Leo Varadkar delivered an apology to the Dáil later that year. Nash put forward a bill in 2019 which aimed to provide greater protection for low paid workers, reform Joint Labour Committees and give the Labour Court the ability to set rates of pay above the minimum wage in low paid sectors of the economy.

=== Return to Dáil (2020–) ===
Nash was re-elected to the Dáil at the 2020 general election, with Simon Carswell of The Irish Times attributing his election to "four years of local campaigning on issues such as fighting gangland crime and improving Drogheda’s water infrastructure".

After Brendan Howlin announced his intention to step down as leader of the Labour Party, Nash was considered a potential candidate for the party leadership race. However, he ruled himself out shortly afterwards, saying "There is a responsibility on my local Dáil colleagues and I to work night and day both locally and nationally to fix them. This is where my immediate focus must lie". Nash nominated Aodhán Ó Ríordáin for the position of leader.

He was re-elected at the 2024 general election.

== Personal life ==
Nash is a director of Drogheda Youth Development, the Calipo Theatre and Picture Company, a Member of Board of the Droichead Arts Centre, a member of Drogheda Rotary Club and a former member of Louth VEC.

Nash has Crohn's disease, which he was diagnosed with in 1990, and has spoken about being bullied as a teenager for it.

Political offices
Preceded by John Perry; Seán Sherlock	Minister of State at the Department of Jobs, Enterprise and Innovation; 2014–2016; With: Damien English	Succeeded by Pat Breen; John Halligan

Dáil	Election	Deputy (Party)	Deputy (Party)	Deputy (Party)	Deputy (Party)	Deputy (Party)
4th	1923	Frank Aiken (Rep)	Peter Hughes (CnaG)	James Murphy (CnaG)	3 seats until 1977	
5th	1927 (Jun)	Frank Aiken (FF)	James Coburn (NL)	James Murphy (CnaG)	3 seats until 1977	
6th	1927 (Sep)	Frank Aiken (FF)	James Coburn (NL)	James Murphy (CnaG)	3 seats until 1977	
7th	1932	Frank Aiken (FF)	James Coburn (Ind.)	James Murphy (CnaG)	3 seats until 1977	
8th	1933	Frank Aiken (FF)	James Coburn (Ind.)	James Murphy (CnaG)	3 seats until 1977	
9th	1937	Frank Aiken (FF)	James Coburn (FG)	Laurence Walsh (FF)	3 seats until 1977	
10th	1938	Frank Aiken (FF)	James Coburn (FG)	Laurence Walsh (FF)	3 seats until 1977	
11th	1943	Frank Aiken (FF)	James Coburn (FG)	Roddy Connolly (Lab)	3 seats until 1977	
12th	1944	Frank Aiken (FF)	James Coburn (FG)	Laurence Walsh (FF)	3 seats until 1977	
13th	1948	Frank Aiken (FF)	James Coburn (FG)	Roddy Connolly (Lab)	3 seats until 1977	
14th	1951	Frank Aiken (FF)	James Coburn (FG)	Laurence Walsh (FF)	3 seats until 1977	
14th	1954 by-election	Frank Aiken (FF)	George Coburn (FG)	Laurence Walsh (FF)	3 seats until 1977	
15th	1954	Frank Aiken (FF)	George Coburn (FG)	Paddy Donegan (FG)	3 seats until 1977	
16th	1957	Frank Aiken (FF)	George Coburn (FG)	Pádraig Faulkner (Note: Faulker served as Ceann Comhairle in the 21st Dáil from 1977 to 1981, and was returned automatically at the 1981 election.) (FF)	3 seats until 1977	
17th	1961	Frank Aiken (FF)	Paddy Donegan (FG)	Pádraig Faulkner (FF)	3 seats until 1977	
18th	1965	Frank Aiken (FF)	Paddy Donegan (FG)	Pádraig Faulkner (FF)	3 seats until 1977	
19th	1969	Frank Aiken (FF)	Paddy Donegan (FG)	Pádraig Faulkner (FF)	3 seats until 1977	
20th	1973	Joseph Farrell (FF)	Paddy Donegan (FG)	Pádraig Faulkner (FF)	3 seats until 1977	
21st	1977	Joseph Farrell (FF)	Paddy Donegan (FG)	Pádraig Faulkner (FF)	Eddie Filgate (FF)	4 seats 1977–2011
22nd	1981	Paddy Agnew (AHB)	Bernard Markey (FG)	Pádraig Faulkner (FF)	Eddie Filgate (FF)	4 seats 1977–2011
23rd	1982 (Feb)	Thomas Bellew (FF)	Bernard Markey (FG)	Pádraig Faulkner (FF)	Eddie Filgate (FF)	4 seats 1977–2011
24th	1982 (Nov)	Michael Bell (Lab)	Brendan McGahon (FG)	Pádraig Faulkner (FF)	Séamus Kirk (Note: Kirk served as Ceann Comhairle in the 30th Dáil from 2009 to 2011, and was returned automatically at the 2011 election.) (FF)	4 seats 1977–2011
25th	1987	Michael Bell (Lab)	Brendan McGahon (FG)	Dermot Ahern (FF)	Séamus Kirk (FF)	4 seats 1977–2011
26th	1989	Michael Bell (Lab)	Brendan McGahon (FG)	Dermot Ahern (FF)	Séamus Kirk (FF)	4 seats 1977–2011
27th	1992	Michael Bell (Lab)	Brendan McGahon (FG)	Dermot Ahern (FF)	Séamus Kirk (FF)	4 seats 1977–2011
28th	1997	Michael Bell (Lab)	Brendan McGahon (FG)	Dermot Ahern (FF)	Séamus Kirk (FF)	4 seats 1977–2011
29th	2002	Arthur Morgan (SF)	Fergus O'Dowd (FG)	Dermot Ahern (FF)	Séamus Kirk (FF)	4 seats 1977–2011
30th	2007	Arthur Morgan (SF)	Fergus O'Dowd (FG)	Dermot Ahern (FF)	Séamus Kirk (FF)	4 seats 1977–2011
31st	2011	Gerry Adams (SF)	Fergus O'Dowd (FG)	Ged Nash (Lab)	Séamus Kirk (FF)	Peter Fitzpatrick (FG)
32nd	2016	Gerry Adams (SF)	Fergus O'Dowd (FG)	Declan Breathnach (FF)	Imelda Munster (SF)	Peter Fitzpatrick (FG)
33rd	2020	Ruairí Ó Murchú (SF)	Fergus O'Dowd (FG)	Ged Nash (Lab)	Imelda Munster (SF)	Peter Fitzpatrick (Ind.)
34th	2024	Ruairí Ó Murchú (SF)	Paula Butterly (FG)	Ged Nash (Lab)	Joanna Byrne (SF)	Erin McGreehan (FF)
