= Dara Calleary =

Irish politician (born 1973)

Dara Calleary TD
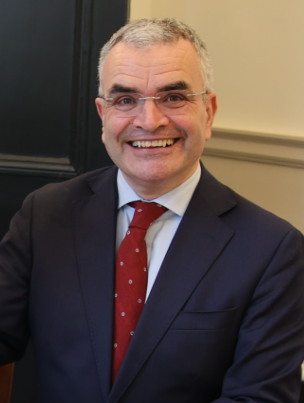
- Calleary in 2024

Minister for Social Protection
- Incumbent
- Assumed office 23 January 2025
- Taoiseach: Micheál Martin
- Preceded by: Heather Humphreys

Minister for Rural and Community Development and the Gaeltacht
- Incumbent
- Assumed office 23 January 2025
- Taoiseach: Micheál Martin
- Preceded by: Heather Humphreys

Minister of State
- 2022–2025: Enterprise, Trade and Employment
- 2020: Government Chief Whip
- 2020: Culture, Heritage and Gaeltacht
- 2020: Transport, Tourism and Sport
- 2010–2011: Taoiseach
- 2010–2011: Finance
- 2010–2011: Enterprise, Trade and Innovation
- 2009–2010: Enterprise, Trade and Employment

Minister for Agriculture, Food and the Marine
- In office 15 July 2020 – 21 August 2020
- Taoiseach: Micheál Martin
- Preceded by: Micheál Martin (acting)
- Succeeded by: Micheál Martin (acting)

Deputy leader of Fianna Fáil
- In office 29 March 2018 – 23 August 2020
- Leader: Micheál Martin
- Preceded by: Éamon Ó Cuív (2012)
- Succeeded by: Jack Chambers (2024)

Teachta Dála
- Incumbent
- Assumed office May 2007
- Constituency: Mayo

Personal details
- Born: 10 May 1973 (age 53) Ballina, County Mayo, Ireland
- Party: Fianna Fáil
- Spouse: Siobhán Greavy (m. 2012)
- Parent: Seán Calleary (father)
- Relatives: Phelim Calleary (grandfather)
- Education: Trinity College Dublin

Dara Calleary (born 10 May 1973) is an Irish Fianna Fáil politician who has served as Minister for Social Protection and Minister for Rural and Community Development and the Gaeltacht since January 2025. He has been a Teachta Dála (TD) for the Mayo constituency since the 2007 general election. He previously served as Minister of State for Trade Promotion, Digital and Company Regulation from 2022 to 2025, Minister for Agriculture, Food and the Marine from July to August 2020, Deputy leader of Fianna Fáil from 2018 to 2020 and Minister of State for Labour Affairs from 2009 to 2011.

== Early life ==
Calleary was born in Ballina, County Mayo, in 1973. He was educated at St Oliver Plunkett National School and St Muredach's College. He later studied at Trinity College Dublin. He previously worked with Chambers Ireland, the largest business organisation in Ireland, and also worked in an Irish bank.

Calleary is the son of Seán Calleary who was a TD for Mayo East from 1973 to 1992, and the grandson of Phelim Calleary who was a TD for Mayo North from 1952 to 1969.

== Political career ==
Calleary has been a member of the Fianna Fáil National Executive since 1997 and has served on party policy committees on Transport, Enterprise and Employment, Agriculture and Youth Affairs.

He was first elected to the Dáil at the 2007 general election. In 2007, Calleary chaired the first ever Ógra Fianna Fáil branch meeting in Northern Ireland, at Queen's University Belfast. In February 2008, Calleary was appointed Chairman of Ógra Fianna Fáil, by Taoiseach Bertie Ahern, at the National Youth Conference in Tullamore, County Offaly.

=== Minister of State ===
On 22 April 2009, he was appointed Minister of State at the Department of Enterprise, Trade and Employment, with special responsibility for labour affairs. On 23 March 2010, he was given additional responsibilities, as Minister of State at the Department of the Taoiseach, at the Department of Finance and at the Department of Enterprise, Trade and Innovation (following departmental restructuring), with special responsibilities for public service transformation and labour affairs.

=== Opposition spokesperson ===
In the Fianna Fáil Front Bench, he served as Spokesperson for Jobs, Enterprise and Innovation from 2011 to 2016 and Spokesperson for Public Expenditure and Reform from 2016 to 2018.

In March 2018, he was appointed Deputy leader of Fianna Fáil by party leader Micheál Martin.

Following the 2020 general election, Calleary served as Fianna Fáil's chief negotiator as the party worked on a deal with Fine Gael and the Green Party to enter into government as a coalition.

=== Appointment as Government Chief Whip ===
On 27 June 2020, at the formation of the new government, Calleary was appointed by Taoiseach Micheál Martin as Minister of State at the Department of the Taoiseach with responsibility as Chief Whip. Although Calleary was deputy leader of Fianna Fáil and chief negotiator for Fianna Fáil, he was not appointed to cabinet. The lack of any representative in the cabinet from the west of Ireland was heavily criticised by some. An article by the Mayo-based Western People declared it "a cabinet fit for Cromwell". While Calleary accepted the role, he publicly acknowledged that he was "angry and disappointed" not to have been offered a departmental portfolio and said that he still saw himself eventually leading a department. On 1 July, he was appointed to the further position of Minister of State for the Gaeltacht and Sport.

=== Appointment to cabinet and resignation ===
On 15 July 2020, following the sacking of Barry Cowen from the position, Calleary was appointed as Minister for Agriculture, Food and the Marine by Micheál Martin.

On 20 August 2020, Calleary was implicated in the Oireachtas Golf Society scandal when news broke that Calleary and 81 others attended an Oireachtas Golf Society dinner the previous day, in apparent breach of Government COVID-19 guidelines. He resigned as Agriculture Minister the following morning. Calleary stated to MidWest Radio that "I made a big mistake. I shouldn't have gone to the function. I didn't want to let people down and I take responsibility for that mistake". Michael Clifford and Paul Hosford of the Irish Examiner, suggested that the scandal had "left [Calleary's] political career in tatters" and had deeply rocked the Martin Cabinet. Three days later on 24 August 2020, he also resigned as Deputy leader of Fianna Fáil. In February 2022, a District Court concluded that the event had not breached public health guidelines and had been safely organised.

=== Return as Minister of State ===
On 31 August 2022, following the resignation of Robert Troy, Calleary was appointed as Minister of State at the Department of Enterprise, Trade and Employment with special responsibility for Trade Promotion, Digital and Company Regulation.

Following the appointment of Jack Chambers as Minister for Finance, Calleary was appointed as super junior minister attending cabinet.

At the 2024 general election, Calleary was re-elected to the Dáil.

=== Return to cabinet ===
On 23 January 2025, Calleary was appointed as Minister for Social Protection and Minister for Rural and Community Development and the Gaeltacht in the government led by Micheál Martin.

== See also ==
- Families in the Oireachtas

Political offices
Preceded by Jimmy Devins; Billy Kelleher; Conor Lenihan; John McGuinness; John Moloney	Minister of State at the Department of Enterprise, Trade and Employment; Minister of State at the Department of Enterprise, Trade and Innovation from 2010; 2009–2011; With: Billy Kelleher; Conor Lenihan; John Moloney	Succeeded by John Perry; Seán Sherlock as Ministers of State at the Department of Jobs, Enterprise and Innovation
Preceded by Pat Carey; Dick Roche	Minister of State at the Department of the Taoiseach; 2010–2011; With: John Curran; Dick Roche	Succeeded by Paul Kehoe; Lucinda Creighton
Preceded by Martin Mansergh	Minister of State at the Department of Finance; 2010–2011; With: Martin Mansergh	Succeeded by Brian Hayes as Minister of State at the Department of Finance and Minister of State at the Department of Public Expenditure and Reform
Preceded by Seán Kyne	Government Chief Whip; 2020	Succeeded by Jack Chambers
Preceded by Seán Kyne	Minister of State at the Department of Culture, Heritage and the Gaeltacht; 2020	Succeeded by Jack Chambers as Minister of State at the Department of Culture, Communications and Sport
Preceded by Brendan Griffin	Minister of State at the Department of Transport, Tourism and Sport; 2020	Succeeded by Jack Chambers as Minister of State at the Department of Culture, Communications and Sport
Preceded by Micheál Martin (acting)	Minister for Agriculture, Food and the Marine; 2020	Succeeded by Micheál Martin (acting)
Preceded by Damien English; Robert Troy	Minister of State at the Department of Enterprise, Trade and Employment; 2022–2025; With: Damien English (2020–2023); Neale Richmond (2023–2025)	Succeeded by Niamh Smyth
Preceded by Heather Humphreys	Minister for Social Protection; 2025–present	Incumbent
Preceded by Heather Humphreys	Minister for Rural and Community Development and the Gaeltacht; 2025–present	Incumbent
Party political offices
Preceded by Éamon Ó Cuív (2012)	Deputy leader of Fianna Fáil; 2018–2020	Succeeded by Jack Chambers (2024)

Dáil	Election	Deputy (Party)	Deputy (Party)	Deputy (Party)	Deputy (Party)	Deputy (Party)
28th	1997	Beverley Flynn (FF)	Tom Moffatt (FF)	Enda Kenny (FG)	Michael Ring (FG)	Jim Higgins (FG)
29th	2002	Beverley Flynn (FF)	John Carty (FF)	Enda Kenny (FG)	Michael Ring (FG)	Jerry Cowley (Ind.)
30th	2007	Beverley Flynn (Ind.)	Dara Calleary (FF)	Enda Kenny (FG)	Michael Ring (FG)	John O'Mahony (FG)
31st	2011	Michelle Mulherin (FG)	Dara Calleary (FF)	Enda Kenny (FG)	Michael Ring (FG)	John O'Mahony (FG)
32nd	2016	Lisa Chambers (FF)	Dara Calleary (FF)	Enda Kenny (FG)	Michael Ring (FG)	4 seats 2016–2024
33rd	2020	Rose Conway-Walsh (SF)	Dara Calleary (FF)	Alan Dillon (FG)	Michael Ring (FG)	4 seats 2016–2024
34th	2024	Rose Conway-Walsh (SF)	Dara Calleary (FF)	Alan Dillon (FG)	Keira Keogh (FG)	Paul Lawless (Aon)
