= Damien English =

Irish former politician (born 1978)

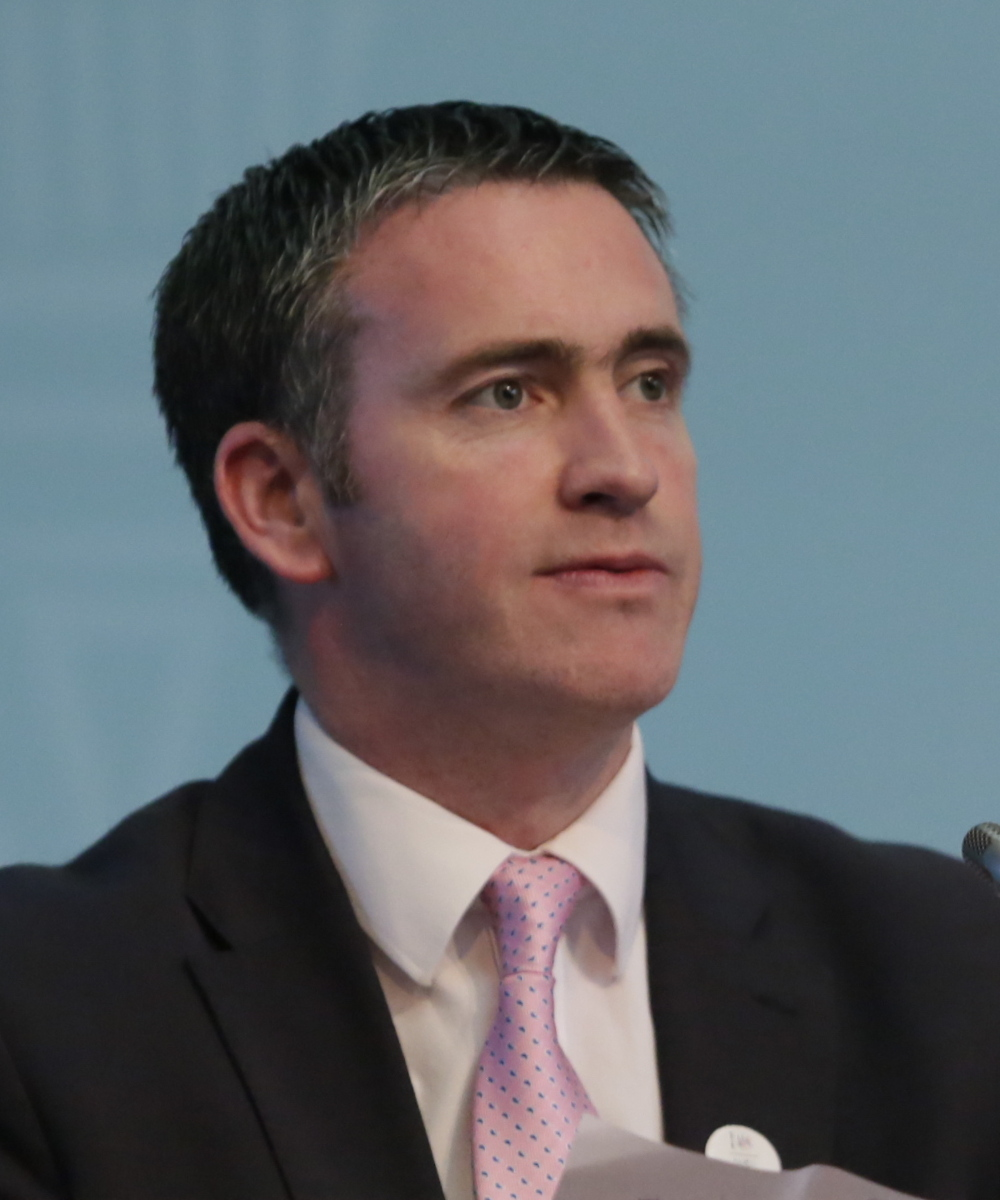
- English in 2015

Minister of State
- 2020–2023: Enterprise, Trade and Employment
- 2020–2023: Social Protection
- 2017–2020: Housing, Planning and Local Government
- 2016–2017: Housing, Planning, Community and Local Government
- 2014–2016: Jobs, Enterprise and Innovation
- 2014–2016: Education and Skills

Teachta Dála
- In office May 2007 – November 2024
- Constituency: Meath West
- In office May 2002 – May 2007
- Constituency: Meath

Personal details
- Born: 21 February 1978 (age 48) Drogheda, County Louth, Ireland
- Party: Fine Gael
- Spouse: Laura Kenny (m. 2007)
- Children: 4
- Education: Dublin Institute of Technology; Dublin Business School
- Website: damienenglish.ie

Damien English (born 21 February 1978) is an Irish former Fine Gael politician who served as a Teachta Dála (TD) for the Meath West constituency from 2007 to 2024, and previously from 2002 to 2007 for the Meath constituency. He served as Minister of State from 2014 to 2023.

== Early and personal life ==
English was educated at Bohermeen National School in County Meath, and went on to attend Kells Community School. He further studied and part qualified with the Chartered Institute of Management Accountants at the Dublin Institute of Technology and Dublin Business School. He is married to Laura, and they have one son and three daughters.

== Political career ==
English first entered politics when he was elected to Meath County Council in 1999, for the local electoral area of Navan, where he was the youngest council member.

At the 2002 general election, he was elected to the 29th Dáil as a Fine Gael TD for the Meath constituency, along with his Fine Gael colleague John Bruton. He was the youngest TD in the 29th Dáil, aged 24 years.

English was elected secretary of the Fine Gael parliamentary party in September 2002, and became the party deputy Spokesperson for Arts, Sports and Tourism. In October 2004, he was appointed deputy Spokesperson for Justice and Community Affairs, with special responsibility for Drugs, Alcohol and Crime Prevention. He was a member of the British–Irish Parliamentary Assembly from 2002 to 2007. He served as deputy Spokesperson on Enterprise with special responsibility for Labour Affairs and Small Business from 2007 to 2010.

In January 2007, English was linked to a statement by fellow Fine Gael TD John Deasy, regarding Deasy's intention to run for the leadership of the party if Enda Kenny failed to bring the party into government following the 2007 general election. English dismissed these claims as being false.

He was party deputy spokesperson for Finance, with special responsibility for Banking and Credit from October 2010 to March 2011.

On 15 July 2014, he was appointed as Minister of State at the Department of Jobs, Enterprise and Innovation and at the Department of Education and Skills with responsibility for Skills, Research and Innovation.

He served as Department of Housing, Planning, Community and Local Government with responsibility for Housing and Urban Renewal from May 2016 to June 2017. He served as Minister of State at the Department of Housing, Planning and Local Government with responsibility for Housing and Urban Development from June 2017 to June 2020.

In July 2020, he was appointed Minister of State at the Department of Enterprise, Trade and Employment with responsibility for Employment Affairs and Retail Businesses and Minister of State at the Department of Social Protection with responsibility for Redundancy and Insolvency Operations and Employer Services.

On 18 September 2024, English announced that he would not contest the next general election.

== Ministerial resignation ==
In January 2023, news website The Ditch published a story claiming English failed to declare ownership of an existing home in his planning application for a new property in 2008. It also claimed he neglected to declare such ownership in the Dáil register of interests. He resigned as Minister of State on 12 January 2023.

Honorary titles
Preceded by Denis Naughten	Baby of the Dáil; 2002–2007	Succeeded by Lucinda Creighton
Political offices
Preceded by Ciarán Cannon	Minister of State at the Department of Education and Skills; 2014–2016	Succeeded by John Halligan
Preceded by Seán Sherlock; John Perry	Minister of State at the Department of Jobs, Enterprise and Innovation; 2014–2016; With: Ged Nash	Succeeded by Pat Breen; John Halligan
Preceded by Paudie Coffey	Minister of State at the Department of Housing, Planning, Community and Local Government; 2016–2017; With: Catherine Byrne	Succeeded by Himself as Minister of State at the Department of Housing, Planning and Local Government
Preceded by Himself as Minister of State at the Department of Housing, Planning, Community and Local Government	Minister of State at the Department of Housing, Planning and Local Government; 2017–2020; With: John Paul Phelan	Succeeded by Peter Burke; Malcolm Noonan
Preceded by Pat Breen; John Halligan	Minister of State at the Department of Enterprise, Trade and Employment; 2020–2023; With: Robert Troy (2020–2022); Dara Calleary (2022–2025)	Succeeded by Neale Richmond

Dáil	Election	Deputy (Party)	Deputy (Party)	Deputy (Party)
4th	1923	Patrick Mulvany (FP)	David Hall (Lab)	Eamonn Duggan (CnaG)
5th	1927 (Jun)	Matthew O'Reilly (FF)	David Hall (Lab)	Eamonn Duggan (CnaG)
6th	1927 (Sep)	Matthew O'Reilly (FF)	Arthur Matthews (CnaG)	Eamonn Duggan (CnaG)
7th	1932	James Kelly (FF)	Arthur Matthews (CnaG)	Eamonn Duggan (CnaG)
8th	1933	James Kelly (FF)	Robert Davitt (CnaG)	Matthew O'Reilly (FF)
9th	1937	Constituency abolished. See Meath–Westmeath		

Dáil	Election	Deputy (Party)	Deputy (Party)	Deputy (Party)	Deputy (Party)	Deputy (Party)
13th	1948	Matthew O'Reilly (FF)	Michael Hilliard (FF)	3 seats until 1977	Patrick Giles (FG)	3 seats until 1977
14th	1951	Matthew O'Reilly (FF)	Michael Hilliard (FF)	3 seats until 1977	Patrick Giles (FG)	3 seats until 1977
15th	1954	James Tully (Lab)	Michael Hilliard (FF)	3 seats until 1977	Patrick Giles (FG)	3 seats until 1977
16th	1957	James Griffin (FF)	Michael Hilliard (FF)	3 seats until 1977	Patrick Giles (FG)	3 seats until 1977
16th	1959 by-election	Henry Johnston (FF)	Michael Hilliard (FF)	3 seats until 1977	Patrick Giles (FG)	3 seats until 1977
17th	1961	James Tully (Lab)	Michael Hilliard (FF)	3 seats until 1977	Denis Farrelly (FG)	3 seats until 1977
18th	1965	James Tully (Lab)	Michael Hilliard (FF)	3 seats until 1977	Denis Farrelly (FG)	3 seats until 1977
19th	1969	James Tully (Lab)	Michael Hilliard (FF)	3 seats until 1977	John Bruton (FG)	3 seats until 1977
20th	1973	James Tully (Lab)	Brendan Crinion (FF)	3 seats until 1977	John Bruton (FG)	3 seats until 1977
21st	1977	James Tully (Lab)	Brendan Crinion (FF)	Jim Fitzsimons (FF)	John Bruton (FG)	4 seats 1977–1981
22nd	1981	James Tully (Lab)	Brendan Crinion (FF)	Jim Fitzsimons (FF)	John Bruton (FG)	John V. Farrelly (FG)
23rd	1982 (Feb)	Michael Lynch (FF)	Colm Hilliard (FF)	Jim Fitzsimons (FF)	John Bruton (FG)	John V. Farrelly (FG)
24th	1982 (Nov)	Frank McLoughlin (Lab)	Colm Hilliard (FF)	Jim Fitzsimons (FF)	John Bruton (FG)	John V. Farrelly (FG)
25th	1987	Michael Lynch (FF)	Colm Hilliard (FF)	Noel Dempsey (FF)	John Bruton (FG)	John V. Farrelly (FG)
26th	1989	Mary Wallace (FF)	Colm Hilliard (FF)	Noel Dempsey (FF)	John Bruton (FG)	John V. Farrelly (FG)
27th	1992	Mary Wallace (FF)	Colm Hilliard (FF)	Noel Dempsey (FF)	John Bruton (FG)	Brian Fitzgerald (Lab)
28th	1997	Mary Wallace (FF)	Johnny Brady (FF)	Noel Dempsey (FF)	John Bruton (FG)	John V. Farrelly (FG)
29th	2002	Mary Wallace (FF)	Johnny Brady (FF)	Noel Dempsey (FF)	John Bruton (FG)	Damien English (FG)
29th	2005 by-election	Mary Wallace (FF)	Johnny Brady (FF)	Noel Dempsey (FF)	Shane McEntee (FG)	Damien English (FG)
30th	2007	Constituency abolished. See Meath East and Meath West				

Dáil	Election	Deputy (Party)	Deputy (Party)	Deputy (Party)
30th	2007	Johnny Brady (FF)	Noel Dempsey (FF)	Damien English (FG)
31st	2011	Peadar Tóibín (Note: Left Sinn Féin 15 November 2018; formed Aontú 28 January 2019.) (SF)	Ray Butler (FG)	Damien English (FG)
32nd	2016	Peadar Tóibín (SF)	Shane Cassells (FF)	Damien English (FG)
33rd	2020	Peadar Tóibín (Aon)	Johnny Guirke (SF)	Damien English (FG)
34th	2024	Peadar Tóibín (Aon)	Johnny Guirke (SF)	Aisling Dempsey (FF)
