= Government of the 32nd Dáil =

Governments in office in Ireland 2016–2017 and 2017–2020

There were two governments of the 32nd Dáil, which was elected at the general election held on 26 February 2016. The 30th government of Ireland (6 May 2016 – 14 June 2017) was led by Enda Kenny as Taoiseach and the 31st government of Ireland (14 June 2017 – 27 June 2020) was led by Leo Varadkar as Taoiseach. They were minority governments with Fine Gael and Independent TDs at cabinet, reliant on the support of other Independent TDs, and a confidence and supply arrangement with Fianna Fáil. It was the first time Fine Gael had returned to government after a general election, and the succession of Varadkar as Taoiseach in 2017 was the first time a Fine Gael leader had succeeded a party colleague as Taoiseach within a Dáil term.

The general election for the 33rd Dáil took place on 8 February 2020. The 33rd Dáil met for the first time on 20 February 2020. Leo Varadkar was proposed as Taoiseach, and was defeated, but no other candidate was successfully nominated. Varadkar tendered his resignation to the president, but the 31st government continued to carry out its duties until the new government was appointed on 27 July 2020.

The 30th government lasted 1 year, 39 days. The 31st government lasted 2 years, 251 days from its appointment until its resignation on 20 February 2020, and continued to carry out its duties for a further 128 days until the appointment of its successor, giving a total of 3 years, 13 days.

== 30th government of Ireland ==
30th government of Ireland
- Government of Ireland

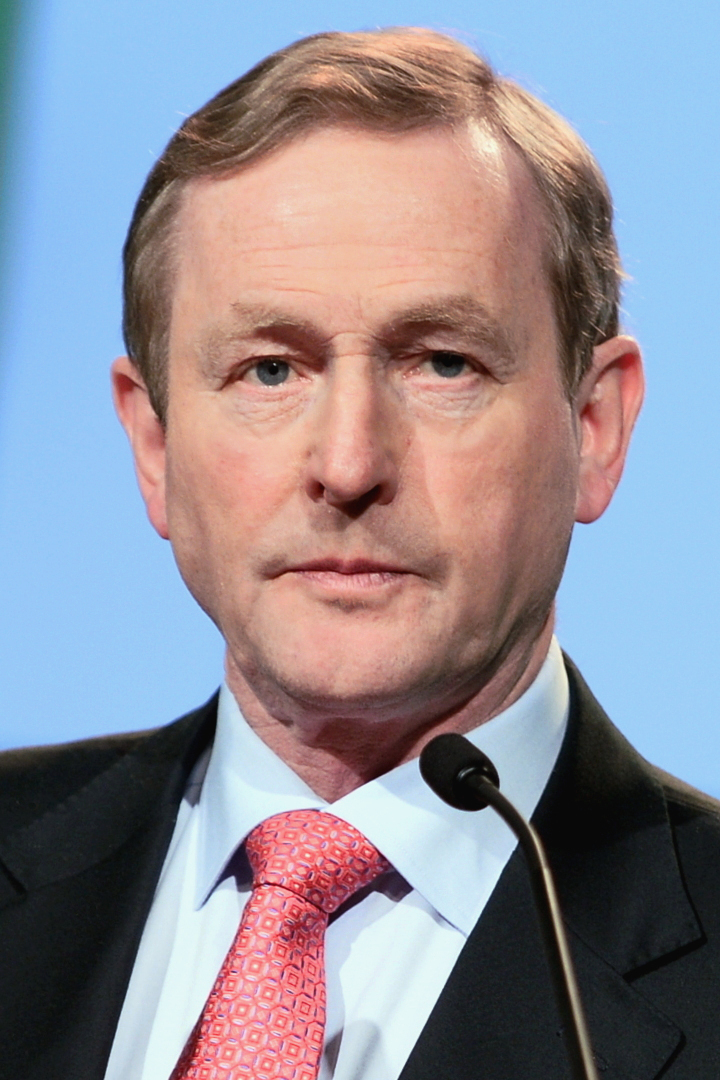
- Date formed: 6 May 2016
- Date dissolved: 14 June 2017

People and organisations
- President: Michael D. Higgins
- Taoiseach: Enda Kenny
- Tánaiste: Frances Fitzgerald
- No. of ministers: 15
- Member parties: Fine Gael; Independents
- Status in legislature: Minority coalition
- Opposition cabinet: Third Martin front bench
- Opposition party: Fianna Fáil
- Opposition leader: Micheál Martin

History
- Incoming formation: 2016 government formation
- Election: 2016 general election
- Legislature terms: 32nd Dáil; 25th Seanad
- Budget: 2017
- Predecessor: 29th government
- Successor: 31st government

=== Nomination of Taoiseach ===
The 32nd Dáil first met on 10 March 2016. In debate on the nomination of Taoiseach, four candidates were proposed. None of the motions proposing these candidates were successful. Fine Gael leader and outgoing Taoiseach Enda Kenny resigned as Taoiseach, with the government continuing in a caretaker capacity to carry out its duties until its successors would be appointed. On 6 April and 14 April, further votes were taken on proposals to nominate candidates for the position of Taoiseach, with no candidate successful. On 6 May, a motion proposing Enda Kenny for appointment as Taoiseach was approved by the Dáil. Kenny was re-appointed as Taoiseach by President Michael D. Higgins.

6 May 2016; Nomination of Enda Kenny (FG) as Taoiseach; Motion proposed by Noel Rock and seconded by Catherine Byrne; Absolute majority: 79/158
Vote	Parties	Votes
Yes	Fine Gael (50), Independent (9)	59 / 158
No	Sinn Féin (23), Labour Party (7), Anti-Austerity Alliance–People Before Profit (6), Independents 4 Change (4), Social Democrats (3), Independents (6)	49 / 158
Not voting	Fianna Fáil (43), Green Party (2), Independent (4), Ceann Comhairle (1)	50 / 158

=== Government ministers ===
After his appointment as Taoiseach by the president, Enda Kenny proposed the members of the government and they were approved by the Dáil. They were appointed by the president on the same day.

Office	Name	Party
Taoiseach	Enda Kenny	Fine Gael
Minister for Defence	Enda Kenny	Fine Gael
Tánaiste	Frances Fitzgerald	Fine Gael
Minister for Justice and Equality	Frances Fitzgerald	Fine Gael
Minister for Finance	Michael Noonan	Fine Gael
Minister for Education and Skills	Richard Bruton	Fine Gael
Minister for Housing, Planning, Community and Local Government (Note: On 23 July 2016 the Department of the Environment, Community and Local Government was renamed the Department of Housing, Planning, Community and Local Government.)	Simon Coveney	Fine Gael
Minister for Social Protection	Leo Varadkar	Fine Gael
Minister for Foreign Affairs and Trade	Charles Flanagan	Fine Gael
Minister for Public Expenditure and Reform	Paschal Donohoe	Fine Gael
Minister for Arts, Heritage, Regional, Rural and Gaeltacht Affairs (Note: On 7 July 2016 the Department of Arts, Heritage and the Gaeltacht was renamed the Department of Arts, Heritage, Regional, Rural and Gaeltacht Affairs.)	Heather Humphreys	Fine Gael
Minister for Health	Simon Harris	Fine Gael
Minister for Agriculture, Food and the Marine	Michael Creed	Fine Gael
Minister for Communications, Climate Action and Environment (Note: On 23 July 2016 the Department of Communications, Energy and Natural Resources was renamed the Department of Communications, Climate Action and Environment.)	Denis Naughten	Independent
Minister for Transport, Tourism and Sport	Shane Ross	Independent
Minister for Jobs, Enterprise and Innovation	Mary Mitchell O'Connor	Fine Gael
Minister for Children and Youth Affairs	Katherine Zappone	Independent

Changes to Departments

=== Attorney General ===
Máire Whelan SC was appointed by the president as Attorney General on the nomination of the Taoiseach.

=== Ministers of state ===
On 6 May 2016, the government on the nomination of the Taoiseach appointed Regina Doherty, Paul Kehoe and Finian McGrath as ministers of state in attendance at cabinet but without a vote. On 19 May 2016, the government on the nomination of the Taoiseach appointed 15 further ministers of state.

Name	Department(s)	Responsibility	Term	Party
Regina Doherty (In attendance at cabinet)	Taoiseach	Government Chief Whip	2016–2017	Fine Gael
Paul Kehoe (In attendance at cabinet)	Taoiseach; Defence	Defence	2016–2017	Fine Gael
Finian McGrath (In attendance at cabinet)	Health; Justice and Equality; Social Protection	Disability Issues	2016–2017	Independent
Seán Kyne	Arts, Heritage, Regional, Rural and Gaeltacht Affairs; Communications, Climate Action and Environment	Gaeltacht Affairs and Natural Resources	2016–2017	Fine Gael
Damien English	Housing, Planning, Community and Local Government	Housing and Urban Renewal	2016–2017	Fine Gael
Dara Murphy	Taoiseach; Foreign Affairs and Trade; Justice and Equality	European Affairs, Data Protection and the EU Single Digital Market	2016–2017	Fine Gael
Eoghan Murphy	Finance; Public Expenditure and Reform	Financial Services, eGovernment and Public Procurement	2016–2017	Fine Gael
Patrick O'Donovan	Transport, Tourism and Sport	Tourism and Sport	2016–2017	Fine Gael
Andrew Doyle	Agriculture, Food and the Marine	Food, Forestry and Horticulture	2016–2017	Fine Gael
Pat Breen	Jobs, Enterprise and Innovation	Employment and Small Business	2016–2017	Fine Gael
John Halligan	Education and Skills; Jobs, Enterprise and Innovation	Training and Skills	2016–2017	Independent
Helen McEntee	Health	Mental Health and Older People	2016–2017	Fine Gael
Marcella Corcoran Kennedy	Health	Health Promotion	2016–2017	Fine Gael
David Stanton	Justice and Equality	Equality, Immigration, and Integration	2016–2017	Fine Gael
Seán Canney	Public Expenditure and Reform	Office of Public Works and Flood Relief	2016–2017	Independent
Joe McHugh	Taoiseach; Foreign Affairs and Trade	Diaspora and Overseas Development Aid	2016–2017	Fine Gael
Michael Ring	Arts, Heritage, Regional, Rural and Gaeltacht Affairs	Regional Economic Development	2016–2017	Fine Gael
Catherine Byrne	Health; Housing, Planning, Community and Local Government	Communities and the National Drugs Strategy	2016–2017	Fine Gael
==== Change on 3 June 2017 ==== In accordance with shared ministry deal between Kevin "Boxer" Moran and Seán Canney
Kevin "Boxer" Moran	Public Expenditure and Reform	Office of Public Works and Flood Relief	2017	Independent

=== Budget ===
The Minister for Finance, Michael Noonan, and the Minister for Public Expenditure and Reform, Paschal Donohoe, delivered the 2017 budget on 11 October 2016.

=== Confidence in the government ===
On 15 February 2017, a motion of confidence in the government proposed by Taoiseach Enda Kenny was approved with 57 votes in favour to 52 against and 44 registered abstentions.

=== Resignation ===
On 17 May 2017, Enda Kenny resigned as leader of Fine Gael. Leo Varadkar succeeded him as leader in a party leadership election concluding on 2 June. On 13 June, Kenny resigned as Taoiseach.

== 31st government of Ireland ==
31st government of Ireland
- Government of Ireland

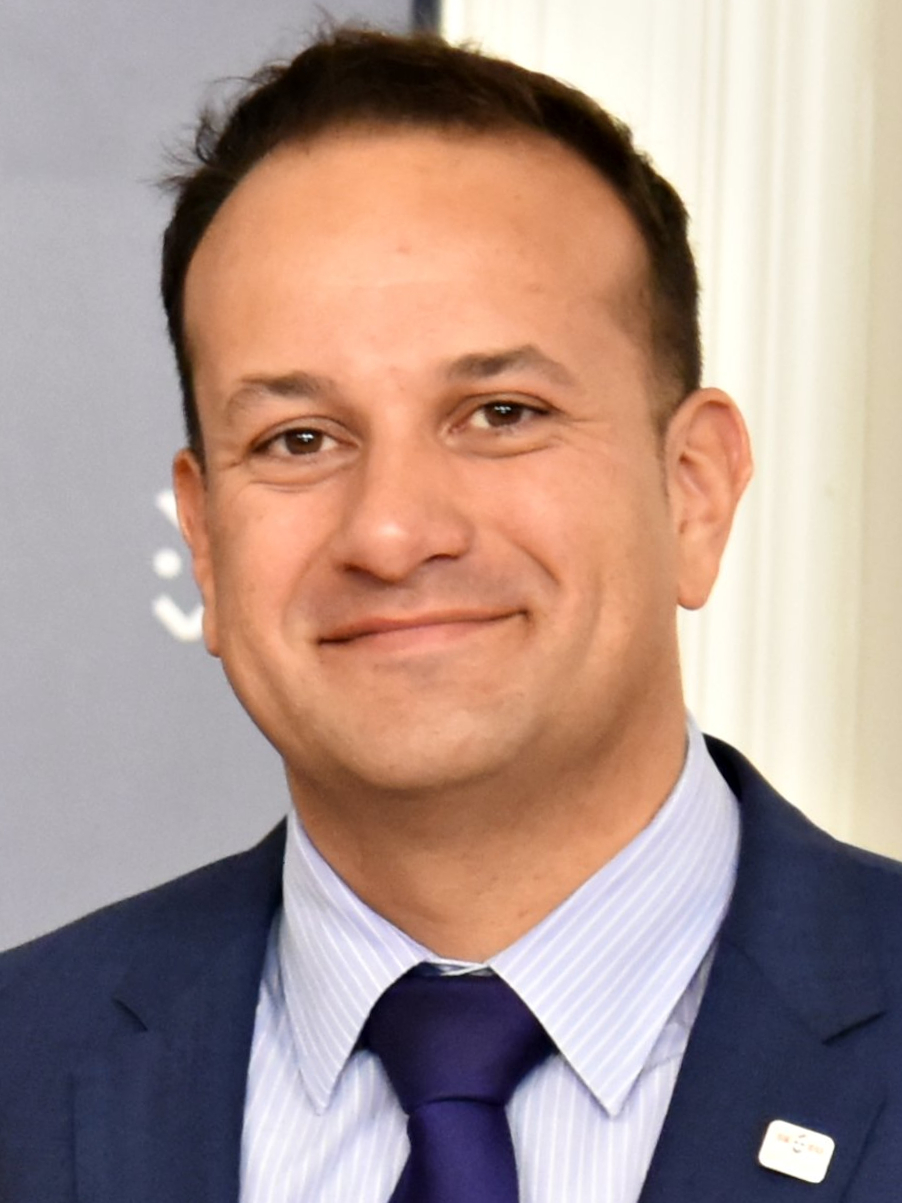
- Date formed: 14 June 2017
- Date dissolved: 27 June 2020

People and organisations
- President: Michael D. Higgins
- Taoiseach: Leo Varadkar
- Tánaiste: Frances Fitzgerald (2017); Simon Coveney (2017–2020)
- No. of ministers: 15
- Member parties: Fine Gael; Independents
- Status in legislature: Minority coalition
- Opposition cabinet: Third Martin front bench
- Opposition party: Fianna Fáil
- Opposition leader: Micheál Martin

History
- Legislature terms: 32nd Dáil; 25th Seanad
- Budgets: 2018; 2019; 2020
- Predecessor: 30th government
- Successor: 32nd government

=== Nomination of Taoiseach ===
After the resignation of Enda Kenny as Taoiseach on the previous day, on 14 June 2017, Leo Varadkar was proposed for the nomination of the Dáil for the position of Taoiseach. This motion was approved and Varadkar was appointed by President Michael D. Higgins. Varadkar was the first Fine Gael leader to succeed a party colleague as Taoiseach within a Dáil term.

14 June 2017; Nomination of Leo Varadkar (FG) as Taoiseach; Motion proposed by Enda Kenny and seconded by Josepha Madigan; Absolute majority: 79/158
Vote	Parties	Votes
Yes	Fine Gael (50), Independents (7)	57 / 158
No	Sinn Féin (23), Labour Party (7), Solidarity–People Before Profit (5), Independents 4 Change (4), Green Party (2), Social Democrats (2), Workers and Unemployed Action (1), Independents (5)	50 / 158
Abstain	Fianna Fáil (41), Independents (4)	45 / 158
Absent or Not Voting	Fianna Fáil (3), Solidarity–People Before Profit (1), Independent (1), Ceann Comhairle (1)	6 / 158

=== Government ministers ===
After his appointment as Taoiseach by the president, Leo Varadkar proposed the members of the government and they were approved by the Dáil. They were appointed by the president on the same day.

Office	Name	Term	Party
Taoiseach	Leo Varadkar	2017–2020	Fine Gael
Minister for Defence	Leo Varadkar	2017–2020	Fine Gael
Tánaiste	Frances Fitzgerald	2017	Fine Gael
Minister for Business, Enterprise and Innovation (Note: The Department of Jobs, Enterprise and Innovation was renamed the Department of Business, Enterprise and Innovation on 2 September 2017.)	Frances Fitzgerald	2017	Fine Gael
Minister for Finance	Paschal Donohoe	2017–2020	Fine Gael
Minister for Public Expenditure and Reform	Paschal Donohoe	2017–2020	Fine Gael
Minister for Foreign Affairs and Trade	Simon Coveney	2017–2020	Fine Gael
Minister for Justice and Equality	Charles Flanagan	2017–2020	Fine Gael
Minister for Health	Simon Harris	2017–2020	Fine Gael
Minister for Culture, Heritage and the Gaeltacht (Note: The Department of Arts, Heritage, Regional, Rural and Gaeltacht Affairs was renamed the Department of Culture, Heritage and the Gaeltacht on 1 August 2017.)	Heather Humphreys	2017	Fine Gael
Minister for Agriculture, Food and the Marine	Michael Creed	2017–2020	Fine Gael
Minister for Education and Skills	Richard Bruton	2017–2018	Fine Gael
Minister for Communications, Climate Action and Environment	Denis Naughten	2017–2018	Independent
Minister for Transport, Tourism and Sport	Shane Ross	2017–2020	Independent
Minister for Children and Youth Affairs	Katherine Zappone	2017–2020	Independent
Minister for Rural and Community Development (Note: The Department of Rural and Community Development was established on 19 July 2017. Ring served as a minister without portfolio until that date.)	Michael Ring	2017–2020	Fine Gael
Minister for Employment Affairs and Social Protection (Note: The Department of Social Protection was renamed the Department of Employment Affairs and Social Protection on 2 September 2017.)	Regina Doherty	2017–2020	Fine Gael
Minister for Housing, Planning and Local Government (Note: The Department of Housing, Planning, Community and Local Government was renamed the Department of Housing, Planning and Local Government on 1 August 2017.)	Eoghan Murphy	2017–2020	Fine Gael
==== Changes on 30 November 2017 ==== Following the resignation of Frances Fitzgerald on 28 November.
Office	Name	Term	Party
Tánaiste	Simon Coveney	2017–2020	Fine Gael
Minister for Business, Enterprise and Innovation	Heather Humphreys	2017–2020	Fine Gael
Minister for Culture, Heritage and the Gaeltacht	Josepha Madigan	2017–2020	Fine Gael
==== Changes on 11 October 2018 ==== Following the resignation of Denis Naughten.
Office	Name	Term	Party
Minister for Communications, Climate Action and Environment	Richard Bruton	2018–2020	Fine Gael
Minister for Education and Skills	Joe McHugh	2018–2020	Fine Gael

Changes to Departments

=== Attorney General ===
Séamus Woulfe SC was appointed by the president as Attorney General on the nomination of the Taoiseach.

=== Ministers of state ===
On 14 June 2017, the government on the nomination of the Taoiseach appointed Joe McHugh, Mary Mitchell O'Connor, Paul Kehoe and Finian McGrath as ministers of state in attendance at cabinet but without a vote. On 20 June, the government on the nomination of the Taoiseach appointed 15 further ministers of state.

Name	Department(s)	Responsibility	Term	Party
Joe McHugh (In attendance at cabinet)	Taoiseach; Culture, Heritage and the Gaeltacht	Government Chief Whip and Gaeilge, Gaeltacht and the Islands	2017–2018	Fine Gael
Mary Mitchell O'Connor (In attendance at cabinet)	Education and Skills	Higher Education	2017–2020	Fine Gael
Paul Kehoe (In attendance at cabinet)	Taoiseach; Defence	Defence	2017–2020	Fine Gael
Finian McGrath (In attendance at cabinet)	Health; Justice and Equality; Employment Affairs and Social Protection	Disability Issues	2017–2020	Independent
Helen McEntee	Foreign Affairs and Trade	European Affairs	2017–2020	Fine Gael
Patrick O'Donovan	Finance; Public Expenditure and Reform	Public Procurement, Open Government and eGovernment	2017–2020	Fine Gael
Michael D'Arcy	Finance; Public Expenditure and Reform	Financial Services and Insurance	2017–2020	Fine Gael
Ciarán Cannon	Foreign Affairs and Trade	Diaspora and International Development	2017–2020	Fine Gael
Jim Daly	Health	Mental Health and Older People	2017–2020	Fine Gael
Brendan Griffin	Transport, Tourism and Sport	Tourism and Sport	2017–2020	Fine Gael
John Paul Phelan	Housing, Planning and Local Government	Local Government and Electoral Reform	2017–2020	Fine Gael
Catherine Byrne	Health	Health Promotion and National Drugs Strategy	2017–2020	Fine Gael
Pat Breen	Business, Enterprise and Innovation; Employment Affairs and Social Protection; Taoiseach; Justice and Equality	Trade, Employment, Business, EU Digital Single Market and Data Protection	2017–2020	Fine Gael
Seán Kyne	Rural and Community Development; Communications, Climate Action and Environment	Natural Resources, Community Affairs and Digital Development	2017–2018	Fine Gael
John Halligan	Education and Skills; Business, Enterprise and Innovation	Training, Skills, Innovation, Research and Development	2017–2020	Independent
Andrew Doyle	Agriculture, Food and the Marine	Food, Forestry and Horticulture	2017–2020	Fine Gael
Damien English	Housing, Planning and Local Government	Housing and Urban Development	2017–2020	Fine Gael
Kevin "Boxer" Moran	Public Expenditure and Reform	Office of Public Works and Flood Relief	2017–2020	Independent
David Stanton	Justice and Equality	Equality, Immigration and Integration	2017–2020	Fine Gael
==== Change on 16 October 2018 ==== Following the appointment of Joe McHugh to Cabinet.
Seán Kyne (In attendance at cabinet)	Taoiseach; Culture, Heritage and the Gaeltacht	Government Chief Whip; Gaeilge, Gaeltacht and the Islands	2018–2020	Fine Gael
Seán Canney	Rural and Community Development; Communications, Climate Action and Environment	Natural Resources, Community Affairs and Digital Development	2018–2020	Independent

=== Constitutional referendums ===
The Thirty-sixth Amendment was proposed by Minister for Health Simon Harris and approved in a referendum on 25 May 2018. It replaced the protection of the right of the unborn with a clause allowing the termination of pregnancy to be regulated by law. It was followed by the Health (Regulation of Termination of Pregnancy) Act 2018.

The Thirty-seventh Amendment was proposed by Minister for Justice and Equality Charlie Flanagan and approved in a referendum on 26 October 2018. It removed the offence of blasphemy from the Constitution. It was followed by the Blasphemy (Abolition of Offences and Related Matters) Act 2019.

The Thirty-eighth Amendment had been proposed by Josepha Madigan as a private member's bill before her appointment to government, and proposed to reduce the waiting period for divorce. It was supported by the Minister for Justice and Equality, who amended it remove the reference to a required period of separation before divorce, and to regulate foreign divorce. It was approved in a referendum on 24 May 2019 and was followed by the Family Law Act 2019.

=== Budgets ===
The Minister for Finance and Minister for Public Expenditure and Reform, Paschal Donohoe, delivered the following budgets:

- 2018 budget, delivered on 10 October 2017
- 2019 budget, delivered on 9 October 2018
- 2020 budget, delivered on 8 October 2019

=== Motions of confidence ===
On 25 September 2018, a motion of no confidence in the Minister for Housing, Planning and Local Government Eoghan Murphy proposed by Eoin Ó Broin for Sinn Féin was defeated, with 49 votes in favour to 59 votes against and 29 registered abstentions.

On 20 February 2019, a motion of no confidence in the Minister for Health Simon Harris proposed by Louise O'Reilly for Sinn Féin was defeated, with 53 votes in favour to 58 votes against and 37 registered abstentions.

On 3 December 2019, a motion of no confidence in the Minister for Housing, Planning and Local Government Eoghan Murphy proposed by Catherine Murphy for the Social Democrats was defeated, with 53 votes in favour to 56 votes against and 35 registered abstentions.

=== Dissolution and resignation ===
On 14 January, Taoiseach Leo Varadkar sought a dissolution of the Dáil which was granted by the president, with the new Dáil to convene on 20 February at 12 noon. The general election took place on 8 February.

The 33rd Dáil first met on 20 February. Leo Varadkar, Fianna Fáil leader Micheál Martin, Sinn Féin leader Mary Lou McDonald and Green Party leader Eamon Ryan were each proposed for nomination as Taoiseach. None of the four motions were successful. Leo Varadkar announced that he would resign as Taoiseach but under the provisions of Article 28.11 of the Constitution, the government continued to carry out their duties until their successors were appointed.

On 27 June, Micheál Martin was nominated by the Dáil for appointment as Taoiseach by the President.

=== Response to COVID-19 ===
The government proposed two pieces of legislation in response to the coronavirus pandemic which were passed by the Oireachtas: the Health (Preservation and Protection and other Emergency Measures in the Public Interest) Act 2020, enacted on 20 March, and the Emergency Measures in the Public Interest (COVID-19) Act 2020, enacted on 27 March. These were the first legislation to have been passed through the Oireachtas while after a government had resigned. Regulations were first introduced by Minister for Health Simon Harris on 8 April.
