= Minister of State at the Department of Enterprise, Tourism and Employment =

List of Irish Ministers of State

The minister of state at the Department of Enterprise, Tourism and Employment is a junior ministerial post in the Department of Enterprise, Tourism and Employment of the Government of Ireland and assists the minister for enterprise, tourism and employment. A minister of state does not hold cabinet rank.

There are currently two ministers of state:

- Niamh Smyth, TD – Minister of State with responsibility for trade promotion, artificial intelligence and digital transformation
- Alan Dillon, TD – Minister of State with responsibility for small businesses and retail

== List of parliamentary secretaries ==
=== Department of Industry and Commerce 1927–1977 ===
Name	Term of office		Party	Government
James Dolan	11 October 1927	9 March 1932	Cumann na nGaedheal	4th EC • 5th EC
Seán Moylan	21 July 1937	9 February 1943	Fianna Fáil	8th EC • 1st • 2nd
Seán O'Grady	9 February 1943	31 December 1946	Fianna Fáil	2nd • 3rd • 4th
Liam Cosgrave	24 February 1948	13 June 1951	Fine Gael	5th
Patrick Crotty	2 June 1954	20 March 1957	Fine Gael	7th
Gerald Bartley	20 March 1957	24 February 1958	Fianna Fáil	8th
Michael Hilliard	24 February 1958	23 June 1959	Fianna Fáil	8th
Seán Flanagan	21 April 1965	10 November 1966	Fianna Fáil	11th
Gerry Collins	2 July 1969	9 May 1970	Fianna Fáil	13th
John Bruton	14 March 1973	25 May 1977	Fine Gael	14th
=== Department of Industry, Commerce and Energy 1977–1978 ===
Name	Term of office		Party	Government
Máire Geoghegan-Quinn	5 July 1977	1 January 1978	Fianna Fáil	15th

== List of ministers of state ==
=== Department of Industry, Commerce and Energy 1978–1980 ===
Name	Term of office		Party	Responsibilities	Government
Máire Geoghegan-Quinn	1 January 1978	11 December 1979	Fianna Fáil		15th
Ray Burke	1 January 1978	11 December 1979	Fianna Fáil		15th
=== Department of Industry, Commerce and Tourism 1980–1981 ===
Name	Term of office		Party	Responsibilities	Government
Ray Burke	12 December 1979	15 October 1980	Fianna Fáil		16th
Thomas Meaney	25 March 1980	30 June 1981	Fianna Fáil		16th
Denis Gallagher	15 October 1980	30 June 1981	Fianna Fáil		16th
=== Department of Trade, Commerce and Tourism 1981–1983 ===
Name	Term of office		Party	Responsibilities	Government
Michael Begley	30 June 1981	9 March 1982	Fine Gael	Tourism	17th
Seán Calleary	28 October 1982	14 December 1982	Fianna Fáil	Tourism	18th
Michael Moynihan	16 December 1982	20 January 1987	Labour	Tourism	19th
=== Department of Industry, Trade, Commerce and Tourism 1983–1986 ===
Name	Term of office		Party	Responsibilities	Government
Edward Collins	15 December 1983	23 September 1986	Fine Gael	Commercial Affairs	19th
=== Department of Industry and Commerce 1986–1993 ===
Name	Term of office		Party	Responsibilities	Government
Patrick Hegarty	13 February 1986	10 March 1987	Fine Gael		19th
Richard Bruton	23 September 1986	10 March 1987	Fine Gael	Energy Affairs	19th
Séamus Brennan	12 March 1987	12 July 1989	Fianna Fáil	Trade and Marketing	20th
Seán McCarthy	12 March 1987	12 July 1989	Fianna Fáil	Science and Technology	20th
Terry Leyden	19 July 1989	11 February 1992	Fianna Fáil	Trade and Marketing	21st
Michael Smith	19 July 1989	15 November 1991	Fianna Fáil	Science and Technology	21st
Mary O'Rourke	13 February 1992	12 January 1993	Fianna Fáil	Trade and Marketing	22nd
Michael Ahern	13 February 1992	12 January 1993	Fianna Fáil	Science and Technology	22nd
=== Department of Enterprise and Employment 1993–1997 ===
Name	Term of office		Party	Responsibilities	Government
Mary O'Rourke	14 January 1993	15 December 1994	Fianna Fáil	Labour Affairs	23rd
Séamus Brennan	14 January 1993	15 December 1994	Fianna Fáil	Commerce and Technology	23rd
Pat Rabbitte	20 December 1994	26 June 1997	Democratic Left	Commerce, science and technology and consumer affairs	24th
Eithne FitzGerald	20 December 1994	26 June 1997	Labour	Labour Affairs	24th
=== Department of Enterprise, Trade and Employment 1997–2010 ===
Name	Term of office		Party	Responsibilities	Government
Michael Smith	8 July 1997	9 October 1997	Fianna Fáil	Science and technology	25th
Noel Treacy	9 October 1997	18 June 2002	Fianna Fáil	Science and technology	25th
Tom Kitt	8 July 1997	18 June 2002	Fianna Fáil	Labour affairs, consumer rights and international trade	25th
Frank Fahey	18 June 2002	29 September 2004	Fianna Fáil	Labour Affairs	26th
Michael Ahern	18 June 2002	20 June 2007	Fianna Fáil	Trade and Commerce	26th
Michael Ahern	20 June 2007	13 May 2008	Fianna Fáil	Innovation Policy	27th
Tony Killeen	29 September 2004	20 June 2007	Fianna Fáil	Labour Affairs	26th
Seán Haughey	20 June 2007	13 May 2008	Fianna Fáil	Lifelong Learning and School Transport	27th
Seán Haughey	13 May 2008	9 March 2011	Fianna Fáil	Lifelong Learning and School Transport	28th
Billy Kelleher	20 June 2007	13 May 2008	Fianna Fáil	Labour Affairs	27th
Billy Kelleher	13 May 2008	21 April 2009	Fianna Fáil	Labour Affairs	28th
Billy Kelleher	22 April 2009	9 March 2011	Fianna Fáil	Trade and Commerce	28th
John McGuinness	9 July 2007	13 May 2008	Fianna Fáil	Trade and Commerce	27th
John McGuinness	13 May 2008	21 April 2009	Fianna Fáil	Trade and Commerce	28th
Jimmy Devins	9 July 2007	7 May 2008	Fianna Fáil	Disability Issues and Mental Health	27th
Jimmy Devins	13 May 2008	21 April 2009	Fianna Fáil	Science, Technology and Innovation	28th
John Moloney	13 May 2008	22 March 2010	Fianna Fáil	Equality, Disability Issues and Mental Health	28th
Conor Lenihan	22 April 2009	9 March 2011	Fianna Fáil	Science, Technology, Innovation and Natural Resources	28th
Dara Calleary	22 April 2009	22 March 2010	Fianna Fáil	Labour Affairs	28th
=== Department of Enterprise, Trade and Innovation 2010–2011 ===
Name	Term of office		Party	Responsibilities	Government
John Moloney	23 March 2010	9 March 2011	Fianna Fáil	Disability Issues and Mental Health	28th
Dara Calleary	23 March 2010	9 March 2011	Fianna Fáil	Public Service Transformation and Labour Affairs	28th
=== Department of Jobs, Enterprise and Innovation 2011–2017 ===
Name	Term of office		Party	Responsibilities	Government
John Perry	10 March 2011	15 July 2014	Fine Gael	Small Business	29th
Seán Sherlock	19 March 2011	15 July 2014	Labour	Research and Innovation	29th
Damien English	15 July 2014	19 May 2016	Fine Gael	Skills, Research and Innovation	29th
Ged Nash	15 July 2014	6 May 2016	Labour	Business and Employment	29th
Pat Breen	19 May 2016	20 June 2017	Fine Gael	Employment and Small Business	30th
John Halligan	19 May 2016	20 June 2017	Independent	Training and Skills	30th
=== Department of Business, Enterprise and Innovation 2017–2020 ===
Name	Term of office		Party	Responsibilities	Government
Pat Breen	20 June 2017	27 June 2020	Fine Gael	Trade, Employment, Business	31st
John Halligan	20 June 2017	27 June 2020	Independent	Training, Skills, Innovation, Research and Development	31st
=== Department of Enterprise, Trade and Employment 2020–2025 ===
Name	Term of office		Party	Responsibilities	Government
Damien English	1 July 2020	17 December 2022	Fine Gael	Employment affairs and retail businesses	32nd
Robert Troy	1 July 2020	24 August 2022	Fianna Fáil	Trade promotion	32nd
Dara Calleary	31 August 2022	17 December 2022	Fianna Fáil	Trade promotion, digital and company regulation	32nd
Damien English	21 December 2022	12 January 2023	Fine Gael	Employment affairs and retail businesses	33rd
Dara Calleary	21 December 2022	23 January 2025	Fianna Fáil	Trade promotion, digital and company regulation	33rd • 34th
Neale Richmond	13 January 2023	10 April 2024	Fine Gael	Employment affairs and retail businesses	33rd
Emer Higgins	10 April 2024	23 January 2025	Fine Gael	Business, employment and retail	34th
=== Department of Enterprise, Tourism and Employment 2025–present ===
Name	Term of office		Party	Responsibilities	Government
Niamh Smyth	29 January 2025	Incumbent	Fianna Fáil	Trade promotion, artificial intelligence and digital transformation	35th
Alan Dillon	29 January 2025	Incumbent	Fine Gael	Small businesses and retail	35th
