= Bree, County Wexford =

Village in County Wexford, Ireland

Bree Brí
- Village
- Location in Ireland
- Coordinates: 52°26′06″N 6°36′18″W
- Country: Ireland
- Province: Leinster
- County: Wexford

Population (2022)
  - Total: 316
- Time zone: UTC+0 (WET)
  - Summer (DST): UTC-1 (IST (WEST))
- Area code: 053

Bree (Irish: Brí) is a village located in the centre of County Wexford, in Ireland. As of the 2022 census, Bree had a population of 316 people.

== History ==
There is a well-preserved portal tomb (sometimes called a dolmen) located nearby at Ballybrittas, on Bree Hill, which dates from the Neolithic period.

Sir James Keating, Prior of the Order of Knights Hospitaller and a leading member of the Irish government, was born here in the early years of the 15th century.

== Amenities ==
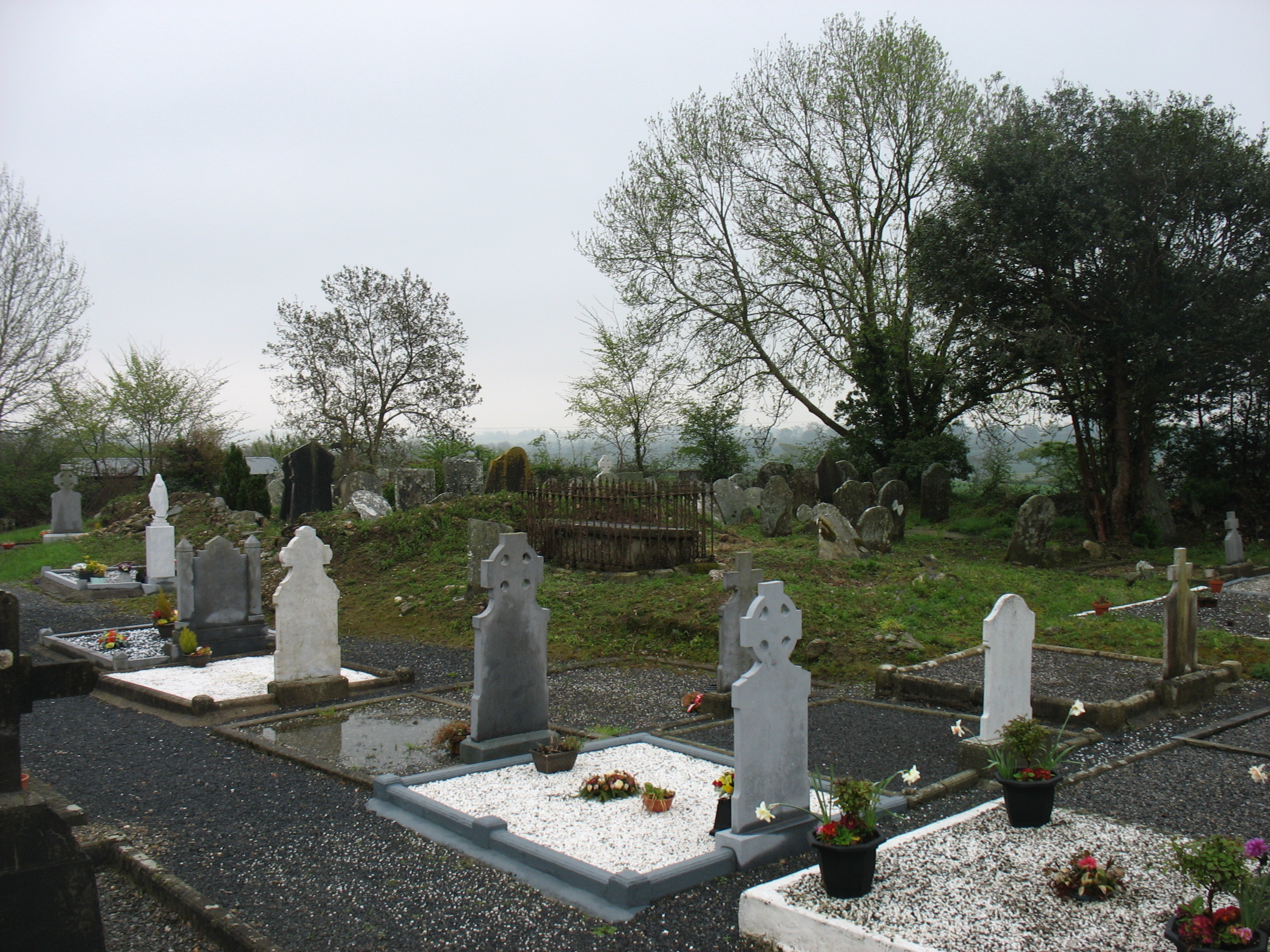
Clonmore graveyard

The village contains a primary school, a community centre, a Gaelic Athletic Association (GAA) pitch and a soccer club (Bree United).

The local Roman Catholic church, the Church of the Assumption, has an adjoining cemetery. An Anglican church is also located nearby. This church, Clonmore Church of Ireland church, was erected in 1827 and also has an adjoining cemetery.

== People ==
- Paul Kehoe, politician and TD

== See also ==
- List of towns and villages in Ireland
