= Neale Richmond =

Irish politician (born 1983)

Neale Richmond TD
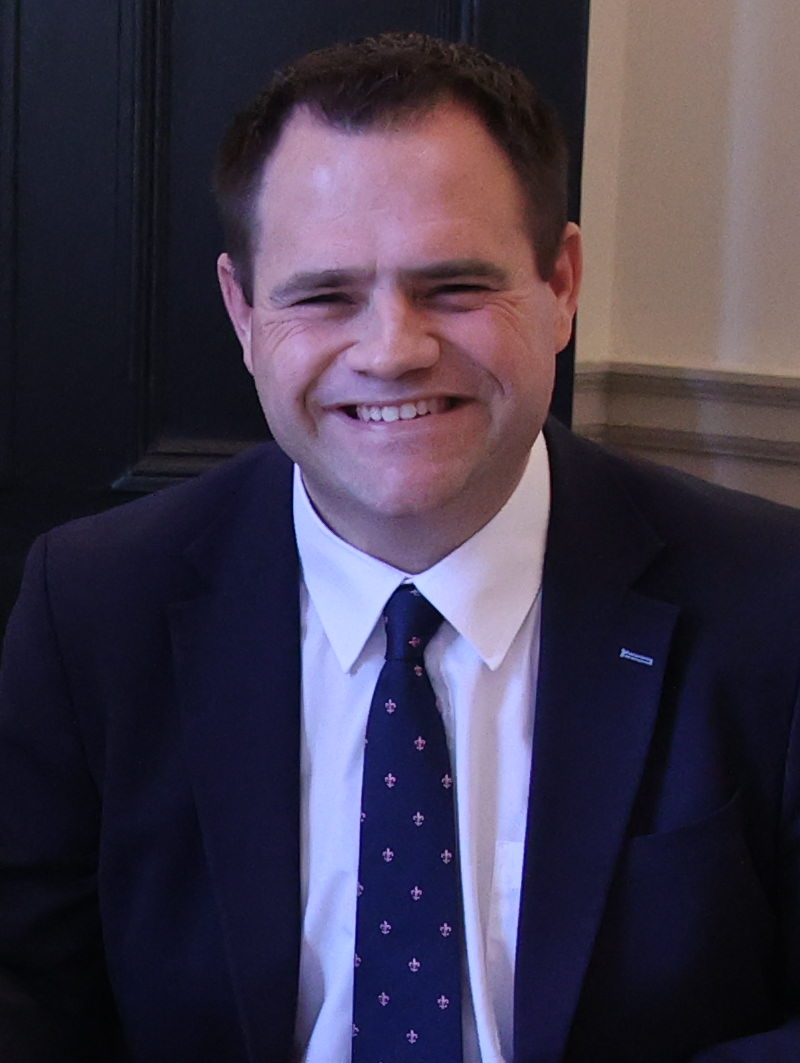
- Richmond in 2024

Minister of State
- 2025–: Foreign Affairs and Trade
- 2024–2025: Finance
- 2023–2024: Enterprise, Trade and Employment
- 2023–2024: Social Protection

Teachta Dála
- Incumbent
- Assumed office February 2020
- Constituency: Dublin Rathdown

Senator
- In office 8 June 2016 – 8 February 2020
- Constituency: Labour Panel

Personal details
- Born: 15 March 1983 (age 43) Ballinteer, Dublin, Ireland
- Party: Fine Gael
- Spouse: Babs Richmond (m. 2015)
- Children: 2
- Education: University College Dublin

Neale Richmond (born 15 March 1983) is an Irish Fine Gael politician who has served as Minister of State since 2023. He has been a Teachta Dála (TD) for the Dublin Rathdown constituency since the 2020 general election. He previously served as a Senator for the Labour Panel from 2016 to 2020.

== Early life ==
A native of Ballinteer, Dublin, Richmond was educated at Taney Parish Primary School and Wesley College, before graduating from University College Dublin (UCD), with a BA in history in 2004 and an MA in political science in 2005. He lives in Stepaside with his wife and family. His older brother Graham Richmond is a member of Wicklow County Council. Richmond is a member of the Church of Ireland.

== Political career ==
While studying in UCD, Richmond was chair of the UCD branch of Young Fine Gael. After leaving college, he began working for Gay Mitchell in the European Parliament.

He was elected to Dún Laoghaire–Rathdown County Council in 2009 to represent the Glencullen–Sandyford local electoral area. Richmond was re-elected to the Council in 2014 on the first count. Following his re-election to the council, he was appointed by the Taoiseach as one of Ireland's nine delegates to the European Committee of the Regions.

From 2011 to 2016, Richmond served as the parliamentary assistant to Olivia Mitchell. After announcing that she would retire at the 2016 general election, Mitchell backed Richmond to run in Dublin Rathdown in her place, and he was seen as the favourite to be selected for Fine Gael, but Josepha Madigan and Alan Shatter defeated him in the selection convention.

He was elected to Seanad Éireann in 2016 for the Labour Panel. He was appointed Chair of the Seanad Select Committee on the decision of the United Kingdom to leave the European Union on 23 February 2017.

Following the 2020 general election, Richmond was elected to Dáil Éireann as a Fine Gael TD for the Dublin Rathdown constituency, taking the second seat in the three-seat constituency behind Catherine Martin and ahead of party colleague Josepha Madigan.

On 13 January 2023, Richmond was appointed as Minister of State at the Department of Enterprise, Trade and Employment and Minister of State at the Department of Social Protection following the resignation of Damien English.

On 10 April 2024, Richmond was appointed as Minister of State at the Department of Finance following the appointment of Simon Harris as Taoiseach.

At the 2024 general election, Richmond was re-elected to the Dáil.

== Political views ==
Richmond is a strong advocate of the European Union and Ireland's interests in it. He is an outspoken critic of Brexit. Richmond has expressed his opposition to Irish neutrality, describing it as "morally degenerate". He was a columnist at Slugger O'Toole.

Richmond stated his initial disinterest in, but ultimate support for, the issue of same-sex marriage. He supported the referendum to repeal the Eighth Amendment.

Richmond is a vocal proponent of a United Ireland. He has been a prominent supporter of the Ireland's Future campaign for a United Ireland, speaking at multiple events in Ireland and the UK He produced a paper entitled "Towards a New Ireland" advocating for a United Ireland and how it could be achieved, which he delivered at the University of Cambridge in April 2021. In 2022, Richmond called for the Government of Ireland to prepare for a border poll on Irish unity, including the establishment of an all-party special Oireachtas committee to address associated challenges and opportunities. Richmond has stated that the debate on Irish unity must transition from "aspirational to achievable", in order to "clearly map out what our vision for a new State would look like." He is in favour of the Republic of Ireland rejoining the Commonwealth in the context of a United Ireland.

Richmond wears the Irish branch of the Royal British Legion's "shamrock remembrance poppy" to commemorate 200,000 Irish soldiers who fought and 35,000 Irish soldiers who died in World War I. He has been strongly critical of Sinn Féin and the Provisional IRA. Richmond has stated that he believes the Easter lily "has become offensive". Richmond has attended July 12th celebrations marking the Battle of the Boyne and has had meetings with the Orange Order, which his grandfather was a member of.

Political offices
Preceded by Damien English	Minister of State at the Department of Enterprise, Trade and Employment; 2023–2024; With: Dara Calleary (2022–present)	Succeeded by Emer Higgins
Preceded by Jennifer Carroll MacNeill	Minister of State at the Department of Finance; 2024–2025	Succeeded by Robert Troy
Preceded by Seán Fleming	Minister of State at the Department of Foreign Affairs and Trade; 2025–present	Incumbent

Dáil	Election	Deputy (Party)	Deputy (Party)	Deputy (Party)	Deputy (Party)
32nd	2016	Catherine Martin (GP)	Shane Ross (Ind.)	Josepha Madigan (FG)	3 seats 2016–2024
33rd	2020	Catherine Martin (GP)	Neale Richmond (FG)	Josepha Madigan (FG)	3 seats 2016–2024
34th	2024	Sinéad Gibney (SD)	Neale Richmond (FG)	Maeve O'Connell (FG)	Shay Brennan (FF)
