= 2017 Irish budget =

- Presented: 11 October 2016
- Parliament: 32nd Dáil
- Government: 30th Government of Ireland
- Party: Fine Gael
- Minister for Finance: Michael Noonan
- Minister for Public Expenditure and Reform: Paschal Donohoe
- Website: Budget 2017

The 2017 Irish budget was the Irish Government budget for the 2017 fiscal year, which was presented to Dáil Éireann on 11 October 2016. Michael Noonan announced the tax measures and Paschal Donohoe the Minister for Public Expenditure and Reform announced the spending adjustments.

== Summary ==
- Social welfare payments and the State pension are to increase by €5 per week commencing from the start of March.
- 50 cent added to the price of a packet of 20 cigarettes. The excise on alcohol and fuel is being left unchanged.
- Three USC brackets will be reduced by half a percent.
- A tax rebate of up to €20,000 in a new help-to-buy scheme for first-time buyers. This goes toward a deposit for a new home.
- The rent-a-room relief is to be increased. With a higher tax ceiling of €14,000 (from €12,000), the government hopes to encourage homeowners to rent out a vacant room.
- The Home Renovation Incentive Scheme is being extended by two years to the end of 2018 to help those not buying new homes.
- The home carers’ credit is to increase by €100 to bring it up to €1,100.
- The Government is reducing the €25 cap on prescription charges for over-70s to €20 from 1 March.
- Social welfare recipients will be entitled to a Christmas bonus equal to 85 per cent of their weekly payment (up from 75 per cent in 2015).
- 800 new gardaí to be recruited in 2017.
- Funding for the Department of Defence is to increase by €16 million.
- €1.2bn in funding for housing, with 47,000 new social housing units by 2021.
- Medical card for all children who receive domiciliary care allowance.
- Intention to introduce tax on sugar-sweetened drinks in April 2018 after public consultation.
