= 2020 Irish budget =

- Presented: 8 October 2019
- Parliament: 32nd Dáil
- Government: 31st government of Ireland
- Party: Fine Gael
- Minister for Finance and Minister for Public Expenditure and Reform: Paschal Donohoe
- Website: Budget 2020

The 2020 Irish budget was the Irish Government Budget for the 2020 fiscal year was presented to Dáil Éireann on 8 October 2019 by Minister for Finance Paschal Donohoe, his third as Minister for Finance.

== Summary ==
=== Brexit ===
- A Brexit package of €1.2 billion was announced. In the event of a no-deal the following measures will be deployed,
- €220 million will be deployed immediately.
- €650 million for agriculture, enterprise and tourism sectors to assist the regions and populations most affected.
- €85 million for beef farmers and €6 million for other livestock farmers and the mushroom sectors.
- €14 million for the fishing industry.
- €5 million for the food and drinks processing industry.
- €365 million for extra social protection expenditure benefit.
- €45 million to assist people to transition to new work.

=== Other ===
- Carbon tax is up €6 to €26 per tonne
- Health spending is up €1 billion to €17.4 billion. Free GP care for children under eight and free dental care for children under six from September.
- €11 billion will be provided to the Department of Education in 2020.
- Christmas bonus to all social welfare recipients in 2019.
- €80 million for housing assistance payment.
- 50 cent increase on a packet of 20 cigarettes from midnight
- €1.5 billion will be transferred to the Government's rainy day fund
