= 2018 Irish budget =

Government budget in Ireland

- Presented: 10 October 2017
- Parliament: 32nd Dáil
- Government: 31st Government of Ireland
- Party: Fine Gael
- Minister for Finance and Minister for Public Expenditure and Reform: Paschal Donohoe
- Website: Budget 2018

The 2018 Irish budget was the Irish Government budget for the 2018 fiscal year, which was presented to Dáil Éireann on 10 October 2017 by Minister for Finance Paschal Donohoe, his first as Minister for Finance.

Taoiseach Leo Varadkar said the budget is a "Budget with many authors and it was important we had something for everyone".

== Summary ==
- €1.83 billion has been allocated to housing, with 3,800 social houses to be built by local authorities and approved housing bodies.
- Funding for homeless services will increase by €18 million.
- Stamp duty on commercial property transactions will rise from 2% to 6% from 11 October 2017.
- An additional 1,300 teaching posts have been announced. 1,000 new Special Needs Assistants being recruited and an additional 800 gardaí will be recruited during 2018.
- A reduction in prescription charges for all medical card holders under 70 from €2.50 to €2 per item.
- A €5 per week increase in all weekly social welfare payments from end of March 2018.
- Christmas bonus payment of 85% will be paid to all social welfare recipients.
- 2.5% USC rate will be reduced to 2% with the ceiling for the new rate increased from €18,772 to €19,372.
- 30 cent per litre of tax on drinks with over 8g of sugar per 100ml from April 2018.
- The excise duty on a packet of 20 cigarettes will rise by 50 cents from 11 October 2017.
- No changes in price to alcohol, petrol and diesel.
