= 2019 Irish budget =

- Presented: 9 October 2018
- Country: Ireland
- Parliament: 32nd Dáil
- Government: 31st government of Ireland
- Party: Fine Gael
- Minister for Finance and Minister for Public Expenditure and Reform: Paschal Donohoe
- Website: Budget 2019

The 2019 Irish budget was the Irish Government budget for the 2019 fiscal year was presented to Dáil Éireann on 9 October 2018 by Minister for Finance Paschal Donohoe, his second as Minister for Finance.

== Summary ==
- The cost of a packet of 20 cigarettes to go up by €0.50, to bring the total cost of a pack to €12.70.
- Duties on alcohol go unchanged.
- No changes in the price of diesel or petrol.
- The VAT rate for the tourism and hospitality sector increases from 9% to 13.5%.
- Social Welfare payments to rise by €5.
- Christmas bonus to Social Welfare recipients to be restored to 100%.
- Government to commit €1.25 billion for the delivery of 10,000 new social homes in 2019.
- The Garda budget will rise by €60 million while the defense sector is to benefit from an extra €29 million.
- The minimum wage is to be increased to €9.80 per hour.
