= Paul Kehoe =

Irish former politician (born 1973)

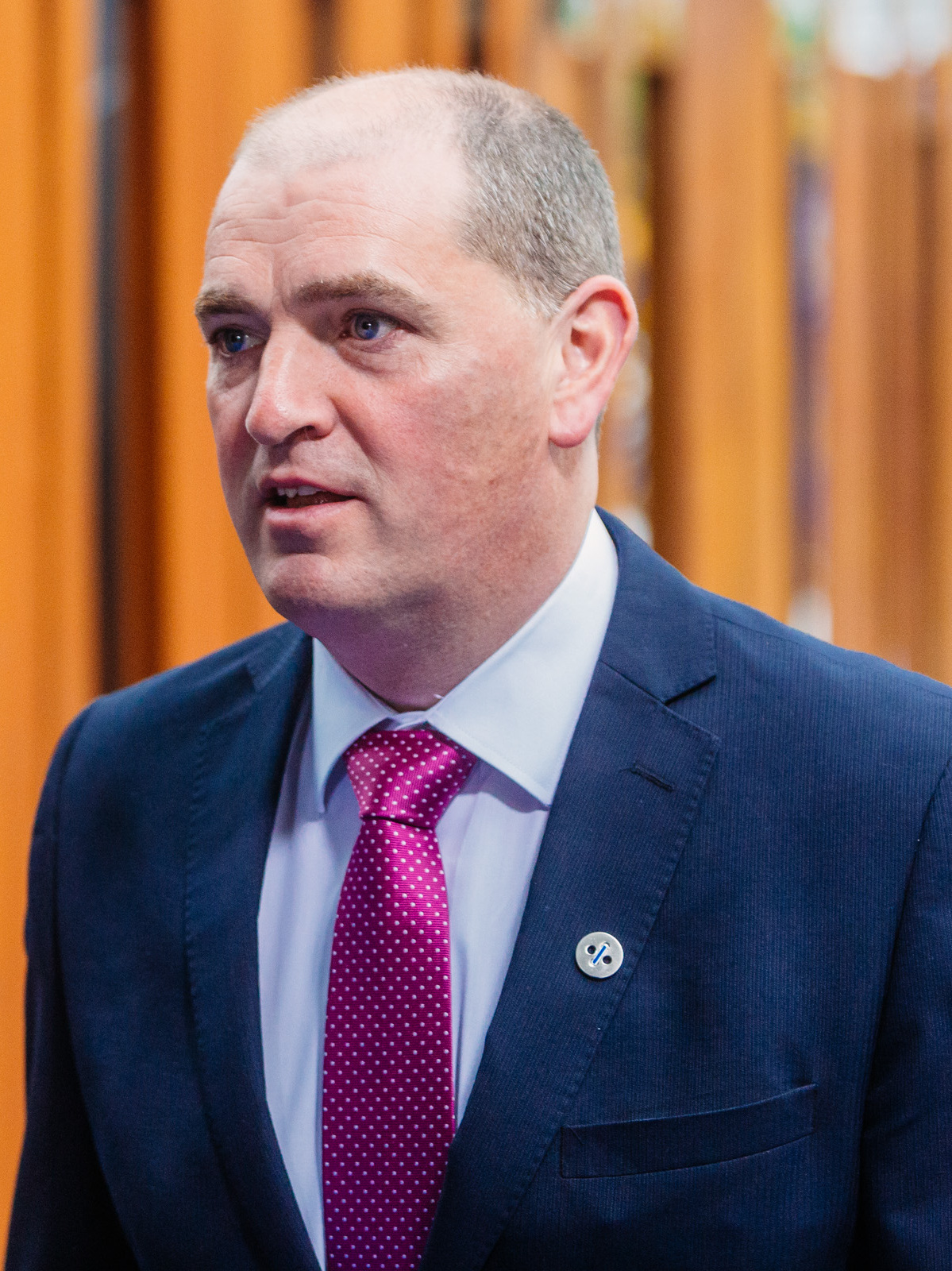
- Kehoe in 2017

Chair of the Committee on Education, Further and Higher Education, Research, Innovation and Science
- In office 15 September 2020 – 8 November 2024
- Preceded by: New office

Minister of State
- 2011–2020: Defence
- 2011–2020: Taoiseach
- 2011–2016: Government Chief Whip

Teachta Dála
- In office May 2002 – November 2024
- Constituency: Wexford

Personal details
- Born: 11 January 1973 (age 53) Bree, County Wexford, Ireland
- Party: Fine Gael
- Spouse: Brigid O'Connor (m. 2007)
- Children: 3
- Education: Kildalton Agricultural College
- Website: paulkehoe.com

Paul Kehoe (born 11 January 1973) is an Irish former Fine Gael politician who served as a Teachta Dála (TD) for the Wexford constituency from 2002 to 2024. He was appointed Chair of the Committee on Education, Further and Higher Education, Research, Innovation and Science in September 2020. He served as Minister of State at the Department of Defence from 2011 to 2020 and Government Chief Whip from 2011 to 2016.

== Early and private life ==
Kehoe was born in Bree, County Wexford, in 1973. The son of Myles and Bernadette Kehoe, his father was a farmer and political activist. He was educated at St. Mary's CBS, Enniscorthy, and Kildalton Agricultural College, County Kilkenny. Kehoe is also a farmer. He is married to Brigid O'Connor, of Taghmon, and the couple have three children.

== Political career ==
Kehoe was first elected to Dáil Éireann as a Fine Gael TD for the Wexford constituency at the 2002 general election. In June 2002, Enda Kenny became Leader of Fine Gael and Kehoe was appointed Fine Gael Spokesperson for Communications, Marine and Environment. He has also served as Fine Gael Assistant Chief Whip. He was re-elected at the 2007, 2011, 2016 and 2020 general elections.

On 9 March 2011, he was appointed as to be Minister of State at the Department of the Taoiseach, with special responsibility as Government Chief Whip, and Minister of State at the Department of Defence, by the coalition government of Fine Gael and the Labour Party led by Enda Kenny.

On 6 May 2016, he was appointed as Minister of State to the same departments by the new minority government of Fine Gael and Independents led by Enda Kenny. He did not continue as Government Chief Whip, but continued to attend government meetings, with increased duties as Minister of State where Kenny assigned himself as Minister for Defence. On 14 June 2017, he was appointed as Minister of State to the same departments by the new minority government of Fine Gael and Independents led by Leo Varadkar, where Varadkar similarly assigned himself as Minister for Defence.

During his term as Minister of State for Defence, Kehoe was the subject of controversy for comments he made about Naval Service vessels being docked, with two former Irish Naval Service officers calling on him to resign and stating he "smacks of a person who doesn't know how the military operates". Kehoe's home was targeted by protesters in April 2019.

During the 2020 general election, Kehoe's office was targeted by protestors from the Air Corps who encouraged voters to not give him any preference votes. He won 8.4% of the first preference votes, and was re-elected on the 11th count without reaching the quota.

Kehoe was not appointed to ministerial office in the coalition government formed on 27 June 2020 by Fianna Fáil, Fine Gael and the Green Party.

In 2021, Kehoe opposed a government proposal to give a €500 bonus to frontline workers, calling it "mad" and "crazy".

On 12 February 2024, Kehoe announced that he would not contest the next general election.

Political offices
Preceded by John Curran	Government Chief Whip; 2011–2016	Succeeded by Regina Doherty
Preceded by John Curran	Minister of State at the Department of Defence; 2011–2020	Succeeded by Jack Chambers

Dáil	Election	Deputy (Party)	Deputy (Party)	Deputy (Party)	Deputy (Party)	Deputy (Party)
2nd	1921	Richard Corish (SF)	James Ryan (SF)	Séamus Doyle (SF)	Seán Etchingham (SF)	4 seats 1921–1923
3rd	1922	Richard Corish (Lab)	Daniel O'Callaghan (Lab)	Séamus Doyle (AT-SF)	Michael Doyle (FP)	4 seats 1921–1923
4th	1923	Richard Corish (Lab)	James Ryan (Rep)	Robert Lambert (Rep)	Michael Doyle (FP)	Osmond Esmonde (CnaG)
5th	1927 (Jun)	Richard Corish (Lab)	James Ryan (FF)	James Shannon (Lab)	Michael Doyle (FP)	John Keating (NL)
6th	1927 (Sep)	Richard Corish (Lab)	James Ryan (FF)	Denis Allen (FF)	Michael Jordan (FP)	Osmond Esmonde (CnaG)
7th	1932	Richard Corish (Lab)	James Ryan (FF)	Denis Allen (FF)	John Keating (CnaG)	Osmond Esmonde (CnaG)
8th	1933	Richard Corish (Lab)	James Ryan (FF)	Patrick Kehoe (FF)	John Keating (CnaG)	Osmond Esmonde (CnaG)
8th	1936 by-election	Richard Corish (Lab)	James Ryan (FF)	Patrick Kehoe (FF)	John Keating (CnaG)	Denis Allen (FF)
9th	1937	Richard Corish (Lab)	James Ryan (FF)	John Keating (FG)	John Esmonde (FG)	Denis Allen (FF)
10th	1938	Richard Corish (Lab)	James Ryan (FF)	John Keating (FG)	John Esmonde (FG)	Denis Allen (FF)
11th	1943	Richard Corish (Lab)	James Ryan (FF)	John O'Leary (Lab)	John Esmonde (FG)	Denis Allen (FF)
12th	1944	Richard Corish (Lab)	James Ryan (FF)	John O'Leary (NLP)	John Keating (FG)	Denis Allen (FF)
12th	1945 by-election	Brendan Corish (Lab)	James Ryan (FF)	John O'Leary (NLP)	John Keating (FG)	Denis Allen (FF)
13th	1948	Brendan Corish (Lab)	James Ryan (FF)	John O'Leary (NLP)	John Esmonde (FG)	Denis Allen (FF)
14th	1951	Brendan Corish (Lab)	James Ryan (FF)	John O'Leary (Lab)	Anthony Esmonde (FG)	Denis Allen (FF)
15th	1954	Brendan Corish (Lab)	James Ryan (FF)	John O'Leary (Lab)	Anthony Esmonde (FG)	Denis Allen (FF)
16th	1957	Brendan Corish (Lab)	James Ryan (FF)	Seán Browne (FF)	Anthony Esmonde (FG)	Denis Allen (FF)
17th	1961	Brendan Corish (Lab)	James Ryan (FF)	Lorcan Allen (FF)	Anthony Esmonde (FG)	4 seats 1961–1981
18th	1965	Brendan Corish (Lab)	James Kennedy (FF)	Lorcan Allen (FF)	Anthony Esmonde (FG)	4 seats 1961–1981
19th	1969	Brendan Corish (Lab)	Seán Browne (FF)	Lorcan Allen (FF)	Anthony Esmonde (FG)	4 seats 1961–1981
20th	1973	Brendan Corish (Lab)	Seán Browne (FF)	Lorcan Allen (FF)	John Esmonde (FG)	4 seats 1961–1981
21st	1977	Brendan Corish (Lab)	Seán Browne (FF)	Lorcan Allen (FF)	Michael D'Arcy (FG)	4 seats 1961–1981
22nd	1981	Brendan Corish (Lab)	Ivan Yates (FG)	Lorcan Allen (FF)	Michael D'Arcy (FG)	Hugh Byrne (FF)
23rd	1982 (Feb)	Seán Browne (FF)	Ivan Yates (FG)	Lorcan Allen (FF)	Michael D'Arcy (FG)	Hugh Byrne (FF)
24th	1982 (Nov)	Avril Doyle (FG)	Ivan Yates (FG)	John Browne (FF)	Michael D'Arcy (FG)	Hugh Byrne (FF)
25th	1987	Avril Doyle (FG)	Ivan Yates (FG)	John Browne (FF)	Brendan Howlin (Lab)	Hugh Byrne (FF)
26th	1989	Michael D'Arcy (FG)	Ivan Yates (FG)	John Browne (FF)	Brendan Howlin (Lab)	Séamus Cullimore (FF)
27th	1992	Avril Doyle (FG)	Ivan Yates (FG)	John Browne (FF)	Brendan Howlin (Lab)	Hugh Byrne (FF)
28th	1997	Michael D'Arcy (FG)	Ivan Yates (FG)	John Browne (FF)	Brendan Howlin (Lab)	Hugh Byrne (FF)
29th	2002	Paul Kehoe (FG)	Liam Twomey (Ind.)	John Browne (FF)	Brendan Howlin (Lab)	Tony Dempsey (FF)
30th	2007	Paul Kehoe (FG)	Michael W. D'Arcy (FG)	John Browne (FF)	Brendan Howlin (Lab)	Seán Connick (FF)
31st	2011	Paul Kehoe (FG)	Liam Twomey (FG)	John Browne (FF)	Brendan Howlin (Lab)	Mick Wallace (Ind.)
32nd	2016	Paul Kehoe (FG)	Michael W. D'Arcy (FG)	James Browne (FF)	Brendan Howlin (Lab)	Mick Wallace (I4C)
32nd	2019 by-election	Paul Kehoe (FG)	Michael W. D'Arcy (FG)	James Browne (FF)	Brendan Howlin (Lab)	Malcolm Byrne (FF)
33rd	2020	Paul Kehoe (FG)	Verona Murphy (Ind.)	James Browne (FF)	Brendan Howlin (Lab)	Johnny Mythen (SF)
34th	2024	4 seats since 2024	Verona Murphy (Ind.)	James Browne (FF)	George Lawlor (Lab)	Johnny Mythen (SF)
