= John Halligan (politician) =

Irish former politician (born 1955)

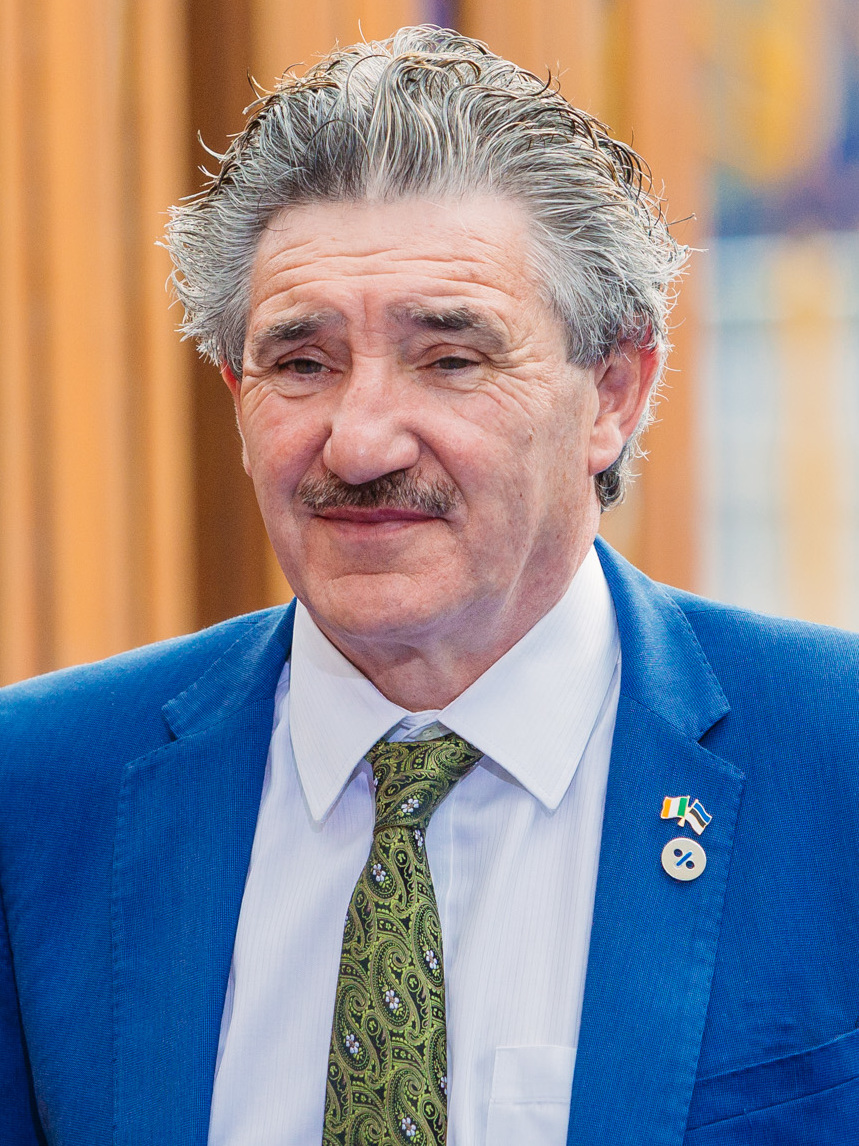
- Halligan in 2017

Minister of State
- 2017–2020: Business, Enterprise and Innovation
- 2016–2017: Jobs, Enterprise and Innovation
- 2016–2020: Education and Skills

Teachta Dála
- In office February 2011 – February 2020
- Constituency: Waterford

Personal details
- Born: 18 January 1955 (age 71) Waterford, Ireland
- Party: Independent
- Other political affiliations: Workers' Party (1999–2007)
- Spouse: Elaine Powell (m. 2016)
- Children: 3
- Education: Waterford Institute of Technology

John Halligan (born 18 January 1955) is an Irish former independent politician who served as a Teachta Dála (TD) for the Waterford constituency from 2011 to 2020. He also served as Minister of State from 2016 to 2020.

He was elected to the Waterford City Council in 1999, for the Workers' Party. At the 2004 local elections, he topped the poll in Waterford No. 3 electoral area. He was an unsuccessful Workers' Party candidate for the Waterford constituency at the 2002 and 2007 general elections. In February 2008, he resigned from the Workers' Party, when the party refused to drop its opposition to service charges, which Halligan supported. In 2009, as an Independent candidate, Halligan again topped the poll in his area. After the 2009 local elections, Halligan entered into a pact with Fine Gael and the Labour Party on Waterford City Council. As a result, he was duly elected Mayor of Waterford, serving from 2009 to 2010.

He was elected as a TD for the Waterford constituency at the 2011 general election, receiving 5,546 first preference votes (10.3%) and was elected on the 11th count. Following his election to the Dáil in February 2011, Sean Reinhardt was co-opted to replace Halligan on Waterford City Council. In March 2011, Halligan joined the Dáil technical group allowing himself more speaking time in Dáil debates. On 15 December 2011, he helped launch a nationwide campaign against a proposed household charge being brought in as part of the 2012 budget.

He joined the Independent Alliance upon its inception in 2015. On 27 February 2016, he was re-elected as a TD for Waterford at the general election, receiving 8,306 first preference votes and was elected on the 8th count. After prolonged talks on government formation, the Independent Alliance supported the nomination of Enda Kenny as Taoiseach on 6 May 2016, allowing Kenny to become the first Leader of Fine Gael to be re-elected to the office of Taoiseach.

On 19 May 2016, Halligan was appointed by the new government a Minister of State at the Department of Education and Skills and at the Department of Jobs, Enterprise and Innovation with responsibility for Training and Skills. On 20 June 2017, after Leo Varadkar succeeded Kenny as Taoiseach, Halligan was appointed by the government as Minister of State at the Department of Education and Skills and at the Department of Business, Enterprise and Innovation with responsibility for Training, Skills, Innovation, Research and Development.

In November 2017, the Workplace Relations Commission found that he had violated equality legislation by asking a candidate "Do you have children? How old are your children?" during a job interview; the WRC ordered the minister's department to pay €7,500 to the candidate.

He retired from the Dáil at the 2020 general election on 8 February, continuing in office as a junior minister until the formation of a new government on 27 June 2020.

Civic offices
Preceded by Jack Walsh	Mayor of Waterford; 2009–2010	Succeeded by Mary Roche
Party political offices
Preceded by Martin O'Regan?	Vice President of the Workers' Party; 2001?–2008	Vacant

Dáil	Election	Deputy (Party)	Deputy (Party)	Deputy (Party)	Deputy (Party)
4th	1923	Caitlín Brugha (Rep)	John Butler (Lab)	Nicholas Wall (FP)	William Redmond (NL)
5th	1927 (Jun)	Caitlín Brugha (Rep)	Patrick Little (FF)	Vincent White (CnaG)	William Redmond (NL)
6th	1927 (Sep)	Seán Goulding (FF)	Patrick Little (FF)	Vincent White (CnaG)	William Redmond (NL)
7th	1932	Seán Goulding (FF)	Patrick Little (FF)	John Kiersey (CnaG)	William Redmond (CnaG)
8th	1933	Seán Goulding (FF)	Patrick Little (FF)	Nicholas Wall (NCP)	Bridget Redmond (CnaG)
9th	1937	Michael Morrissey (FF)	Patrick Little (FF)	Nicholas Wall (FG)	Bridget Redmond (FG)
10th	1938	Michael Morrissey (FF)	Patrick Little (FF)	William Broderick (FG)	Bridget Redmond (FG)
11th	1943	Michael Morrissey (FF)	Patrick Little (FF)	Denis Heskin (CnaT)	Bridget Redmond (FG)
12th	1944	Michael Morrissey (FF)	Patrick Little (FF)	Denis Heskin (CnaT)	Bridget Redmond (FG)
12th	1947 by-election	John Ormonde (FF)	Patrick Little (FF)	Denis Heskin (CnaT)	Bridget Redmond (FG)
13th	1948	John Ormonde (FF)	Patrick Little (FF)	Thomas Kyne (Lab)	Bridget Redmond (FG)
14th	1951	John Ormonde (FF)	Patrick Little (FF)	Thomas Kyne (Lab)	Bridget Redmond (FG)
14th	1952 by-election	John Ormonde (FF)	Patrick Little (FF)	Thomas Kyne (Lab)	William Kenneally (FF)
15th	1954	John Ormonde (FF)	Thaddeus Lynch (FG)	Thomas Kyne (Lab)	William Kenneally (FF)
16th	1957	John Ormonde (FF)	Thaddeus Lynch (FG)	Thomas Kyne (Lab)	William Kenneally (FF)
17th	1961	John Ormonde (FF)	Thaddeus Lynch (FG)	Thomas Kyne (Lab)	3 seats 1961–1977
18th	1965	Billy Kenneally (FF)	Thaddeus Lynch (FG)	Thomas Kyne (Lab)	3 seats 1961–1977
18th	1966 by-election	Billy Kenneally (FF)	Fad Browne (FF)	Thomas Kyne (Lab)	3 seats 1961–1977
19th	1969	Billy Kenneally (FF)	Fad Browne (FF)	Edward Collins (FG)	3 seats 1961–1977
20th	1973	Billy Kenneally (FF)	Thomas Kyne (Lab)	Edward Collins (FG)	3 seats 1961–1977
21st	1977	Billy Kenneally (FF)	Jackie Fahey (FF)	Edward Collins (FG)	Austin Deasy (FG)
22nd	1981	Billy Kenneally (FF)	Jackie Fahey (FF)	Edward Collins (FG)	Austin Deasy (FG)
23rd	1982 (Feb)	Paddy Gallagher (SF–WP)	Jackie Fahey (FF)	Edward Collins (FG)	Austin Deasy (FG)
24th	1982 (Nov)	Donal Ormonde (FF)	Jackie Fahey (FF)	Edward Collins (FG)	Austin Deasy (FG)
25th	1987	Martin Cullen (PDs)	Jackie Fahey (FF)	Brian Swift (FF)	Austin Deasy (FG)
26th	1989	Brian O'Shea (Lab)	Jackie Fahey (FF)	Brendan Kenneally (FF)	Austin Deasy (FG)
27th	1992	Brian O'Shea (Lab)	Martin Cullen (PDs)	Brendan Kenneally (FF)	Austin Deasy (FG)
28th	1997	Brian O'Shea (Lab)	Martin Cullen (FF)	Brendan Kenneally (FF)	Austin Deasy (FG)
29th	2002	Brian O'Shea (Lab)	Martin Cullen (FF)	Ollie Wilkinson (FF)	John Deasy (FG)
30th	2007	Brian O'Shea (Lab)	Martin Cullen (FF)	Brendan Kenneally (FF)	John Deasy (FG)
31st	2011	Ciara Conway (Lab)	John Halligan (Ind.)	Paudie Coffey (FG)	John Deasy (FG)
32nd	2016	David Cullinane (SF)	John Halligan (Ind.)	Mary Butler (FF)	John Deasy (FG)
33rd	2020	David Cullinane (SF)	Marc Ó Cathasaigh (GP)	Mary Butler (FF)	Matt Shanahan (Ind.)
34th	2024	David Cullinane (SF)	Conor D. McGuinness (SF)	Mary Butler (FF)	John Cummins (FG)
