= Niamh Garvey =

Irish writer

- Born: 1986 (age 39–40); Cork, Ireland
- Education: University College Cork (Diploma in Autism Studies)
- Occupation: Author
- Children: 3
- Writing career
- Language: English
- Genres: Non-Fiction, Anthology, Self-Help
- Subjects: Autism, Neurodiversity, Autism in Ireland
- Notable works: Wired Our Own Way: An Anthology of Irish Autistic Voices (2025); Being Autistic (and what that actually means) (2024)
- Notable awards: Great Reads Award; 2024 Being Autistic (and what that actually means) – Shortlist
- Movement: Autism rights movement
- Website: niamhgarvey.com

Niamh Garvey is an Irish author, anthology editor, and researcher. Garvey, who is autistic, edited the first anthology of Irish autistic voices in 2024, Wired Our Own Way and wrote the acclaimed children's book Being Autistic (and what that actually means).

== Biography ==
Garvey was born in Cork in 1986. She later moved to Blarney, but was based in Cork as of 2024.

Garvey graduated with a Certificate in Autism Studies from University College Cork (UCC). She is also a registered nurse.

Garvey married at age 23. In 2025, she acknowledged that she was very young and she was "just ticking boxes of what I thought a social expectation was. Looking back now I think it was very funny that I did that, but thankfully it worked out very well for me.”

Garvey was diagnosed with autoimmune arthritis in her early 30s.

Garvey was diagnosed with autism at 34. Her three children are all neurodivergent. According to Garvey, "when we got told [her daughter was] autistic it was kind of like they were breaking bad news to me ... Whereas when I got diagnosed, it was completely the opposite... The report I got was more like, ‘Congratulations, you’re autistic.’ It was like a celebration of a neurotype.” She describes the diagnosis as a positive experience and explained a lot about herself and her past experiences.

== Career ==
Garvey published her first book, Looking After Your Autistic Self: A Personalised Self-Care Approach to Managing Your Sensory and Emotional Well-Being, in 2023. Garvey wrote the book after a lecturer at UCC suggested a "book of strategies for autistic people."

It received praise upon release, with autistic author Sarah Hendrickx writing that "This is a truly fantastic book full of ideas and strategies delivered in an entirely autistic way. It's so logical, you will wonder why you didn't think of it before,". The NHS includes the book on their list of "Books for autistic adults – and for anyone wanting to improve how they understand and support autistic people" and the NeuroAffirm Institute includes the book on their list of recommended workbooks. In 2025–2026, the book was included in the autism studies curriculum (Postgrad Certificate, MA) of Mary Immaculate College. The e-book is read by Lara Hutchinson and published by John Murray Press.

Autistic illustrator Rebecca Burgess provided art for both of Garvey's children's books: Being Autistic (and what that actually means) (2024) and Growing Up Autistic (finding your way with simple strategies) (2026).

Being Autistic is an illustrated children's book that introduces readers to autistic experiences and what autism is, sensory input and overstimulation, neurodiversity and more. Being Autistic was shortlisted for the Irish Great Reads Award in 2025. Dr. Luke Beardon, a lecturer in autism studies at Sheffield Hallam University, described the book as "wonderful, realistic, optimistic, artistic" and "a resource that could aid you towards that glorious understanding of self that all autistic people deserve." Burgess described Being Autistic as "a perfect way to help autistic kids understand themselves better, without going through a process that might make autism feel daunting or medicalized."

Garvey compiled and edited the best-selling Wired Our Own Way: An Anthology of Irish Autistic Voices, the first anthology of Irish autistic adult voices. The anthology included essays from 24 autistic authors of varying ages, genders, abilities, jobs, and more – and multiple first time authors. Essay authors included writer Jen Wallace, Liam Coulson, AsIAm founder Adam Harris, journalist Chandrika Narayanan-Mohan, non-speaking poet Fiacre Ryan, and actress Stefanie Preissner.

The Irish Independent said that "what Niamh Garvey has put together in Wired Our Own Way is a vitally important and beautiful shared canvas – a portrait and landscape of autistic-ness painted by many hands, with pools of darkness, flashes of bright light and sweeps of genuine brilliance. The shared voice of the book is a clear image portraying the simplest, yet most complicated of messages: here we are."

Garvey wrote her second "supporting, affirming" guide in 2025, The Autistic Guide to Communicating and Connecting: Understanding our communication differences and social needs. The book is split into sections on communication, socialization, and social strategies. She decided to research and write the book after learning about Gestalt Language Processors, or the way in which many autistic people learn language in units or phrases rather than individual words. The e-book is read by Lara Hutchinson and published by John Murray Press.

According to Tony Attwood, "all forms of communication and connection are explored, and all expressions of autism are included in this remarkable new resource. The descriptions, especially the 'reasonable adaptations', are based on an extensive review of the research literature and the experiences of the author and autistic individuals."

== Bibliography ==
- Garvey, Niamh (November 19, 2026). Growing Up Autistic (finding your way with simple strategies). Illustrated by Rebecca Burgess. Jessica Kingsley Publishers. pp. 1–192. ASIN B0CK9MQG87. ISBN 9781399839051.
- Garvey, Niamh (August 21, 2025). The Autistic Guide to Communicating and Connecting: Understanding our communication differences and social needs. Jessica Kingsley Publishers. pp. 1–304. ISBN 9781805012580.
- Garvey, Nimah (March 28, 2025). Wired Our Own Way: An Anthology of Irish Autistic Voices. New Island Books. pp. 1–256. ISBN 9781835940051.
- Garvey, Niamh (June 2024). Being Autistic (And What That Actually Means). Illustrated by Rebecca Burgess. Jessica Kingsley Publishers. ISBN 9781805011712.
- Garvey, Niamh (March 21, 2023). Looking After Your Autistic Self: A Personalised Self-Care Approach to Managing Your Sensory and Emotional Well-Being. Jessica Kingsley Publishers. ISBN 9781839975608.
