= Beardon =

Beardon is a surname. Notable people with the surname include:

- Alan Frank Beardon (born 1940), British mathematician
- Luke Beardon, English academic
