= Simon Harris =

Irish politician (born 1986)

Simon Harris TD
- Harris in 2025

Tánaiste
- Incumbent
- Assumed office 23 January 2025
- Taoiseach: Micheál Martin
- Preceded by: Micheál Martin

Minister for Finance
- Incumbent
- Assumed office 18 November 2025
- Taoiseach: Micheál Martin
- Preceded by: Paschal Donohoe

Taoiseach
- In office 9 April 2024 – 23 January 2025
- President: Michael D. Higgins
- Tánaiste: Micheál Martin
- Preceded by: Leo Varadkar
- Succeeded by: Micheál Martin
Ministerial offices 2014‍–‍2025
Minister for Foreign Affairs and Trade
In office 23 January 2025 – 18 November 2025
Taoiseach	Micheál Martin
Preceded by	Micheál Martin
Succeeded by	Helen McEntee
Minister for Defence
In office 23 January 2025 – 18 November 2025
Taoiseach	Micheál Martin
Preceded by	Micheál Martin
Succeeded by	Helen McEntee
Minister for Further and Higher Education, Research, Innovation and Science
In office 27 June 2020 – 9 April 2024
Taoiseach	Micheál Martin; Leo Varadkar
Preceded by	Office established
Succeeded by	Patrick O'Donovan
Minister for Justice
In office 17 December 2022 – 1 June 2023
Taoiseach	Leo Varadkar
Preceded by	Heather Humphreys
Succeeded by	Helen McEntee
Minister for Health
In office 6 May 2016 – 27 June 2020
Taoiseach	Enda Kenny; Leo Varadkar
Preceded by	Leo Varadkar
Succeeded by	Stephen Donnelly
Minister of State
2014–2016	Finance

Leader of Fine Gael
- Incumbent
- Assumed office 24 March 2024
- Deputy: Simon Coveney; Heather Humphreys; Helen McEntee
- Preceded by: Leo Varadkar

Teachta Dála
- Incumbent
- Assumed office February 2011
- Constituency: Wicklow

Wicklow County Councillor
- In office 2009–2011
- Constituency: Greystones

Personal details
- Born: 17 October 1986 (age 40) Greystones, County Wicklow, Ireland
- Party: Fine Gael
- Other political affiliations: Fianna Fáil (before 2003)
- Spouse: Caoimhe Wade (m. 2017)
- Children: 3
- Relatives: Adam Harris (brother)
- Education: Dublin Institute of Technology (attended)
- Website: Official website
- Simon Harris' voice Simon Harris discusses crime, in the Dáil, as Minister of Justice; Recorded 16 February 2023

Simon Harris (born 17 October 1986) is an Irish Fine Gael politician serving as Tánaiste and Minister for Finance since 2025, having previously served as Taoiseach from 2024 to 2025, Minister for Foreign Affairs and Trade and Minister for Defence from January to November 2025. He has been leader of Fine Gael since 2024 and a TD for the Wicklow constituency since 2011. A Cabinet minister since 2016, he previously served as a minister of state from 2014 to 2016.

Born in Greystones, Harris became politically active as a teenager, campaigning on behalf of children with autism and attention deficit disorder. He was elected to Wicklow County Council in the 2009 local elections. He was elected to Dáil Éireann at the 2011 general election, becoming the "baby of the Dáil" at age 24, and was appointed Minister of State at the Department of Finance in 2014. Following the formation of a Fine Gael minority government in 2016, he was appointed Minister for Health. On the formation of the coalition government in 2020, he was appointed Minister for Further and Higher Education, Research, Innovation and Science. From December 2022 to June 2023, he also served as Minister for Justice during the maternity leave of Cabinet colleague Helen McEntee.

After Leo Varadkar resigned in March 2024, Harris was the only candidate in the 2024 Fine Gael leadership election. Appointed Taoiseach on 9 April 2024 at age 37, he became the youngest holder of the office in the state's history. Due to his use of social media he was dubbed the "TikTok Taoiseach".

== Early life ==
Harris was born in Greystones, County Wicklow, in 1986. He is the eldest of three children born to Bart, a taxi driver, and Mary Harris, a special needs assistant and Montessori teacher. His sister was born on his third birthday, and his brother Adam is eight years younger than him. A grand-uncle of his was a Fine Gael councillor in Dún Laoghaire.

Harris was educated at St David's Holy Faith Secondary School in Greystones, where he was active in drama and was head boy. At the age of 13, he had written a play. He first became involved in local politics as a fifteen-year-old when he set up the North Wicklow Triple A Alliance to help the families of autistic children and children with attention deficit disorder. As a Junior Certificate student, he lobbied politicians to get better facilities to allow children with such disabilities to be integrated into mainstream education. Harris was a member of Fianna Fáil and canvassed for Dick Roche in the 2002 Irish general election, but was later convinced to join Fine Gael by Enda Kenny. He was elected to Young Fine Gael's national executive in 2003.

Harris initially studied valuation surveying for a year (2004/2005) before switching to journalism and French, both at Dublin Institute of Technology. He dropped out during 2005/2006 academic year to pursue a career in politics.

== Early political career ==
Harris began working as a parliamentary assistant to his future cabinet colleague Frances Fitzgerald in 2008, when she was a member of Seanad Éireann. At the 2009 local elections, Harris was elected to Wicklow County Council, with the highest percentage vote of any county councillor in Ireland, and to Greystones Town Council. As a councillor, he served as chairperson of the County Wicklow Joint Policing Committee and Chairperson of the HSE Regional Health Forum. He was a member of Wicklow County Council's Housing Strategic Policy Committee and Wicklow Vocational Educational Committee.

Harris was elected to Dáil Éireann in 2011, taking the third seat in the Wicklow constituency. As the youngest deputy in the 31st Dáil, he was selected by Fine Gael to nominate Enda Kenny for Taoiseach, making his maiden speech. Harris served on the Dáil Public Accounts Committee (PAC) and the Joint Oireachtas Committee on Finance, Public Expenditure, and Reform. He was also a member of the Oireachtas cross-party group on Mental Health, and introduced the Mental Health (Anti-Discrimination) Bill 2013, in June 2013.

Harris ran unsuccessfully as a Fine Gael candidate in the South constituency at the 2014 European Parliament election.

== In government ==
=== Minister of State ===
On 15 July 2014, Harris was appointed as Minister of State at the Department of Finance with responsibility for the Office of Public Works, Public Procurement, and International Banking.

During a period of intense flooding throughout the country during the winter of 2015 and 2016, Harris was forced to deny accusations that the government had left €13m in the budget for flood relief works in 2015 unspent, while he had also secured funding for flood defences in his own constituency.

=== Minister for Health ===
On 6 May 2016, Harris was appointed to the cabinet as Minister for Health. In his first year in the job, Harris faced the possibility of 30,000 health workers and 40,000 nurses going on strike. The planned strikes were later called off.

In 2016, Harris contributed to the "A Healthy Weight for Ireland – Obesity Policy and Action Plan 2016–2025", a policy outlining "the Government's desire to assist its people to achieve better health, and in particular to reduce the levels of overweight and obesity", in which Harris claims that "the approach taken in developing this policy was based on the Government framework for improved health and wellbeing of Ireland".

In 2017, Harris was accused of "practising hypocrisy" over his stance on the Sisters of Charity's ownership of the National Maternity Hospital. The controversy saw the resignations of Peter Boylan and Chris Fitzpatrick from the board of the hospital. The Religious Sisters of Charity later relinquished ownership of three hospitals: St. Vincent's University Hospital in Dublin, St. Vincent's Private, and St. Michael's. Harris was re-appointed when Leo Varadkar succeeded Kenny as Taoiseach in June 2017.

==== Abortion legislation ====
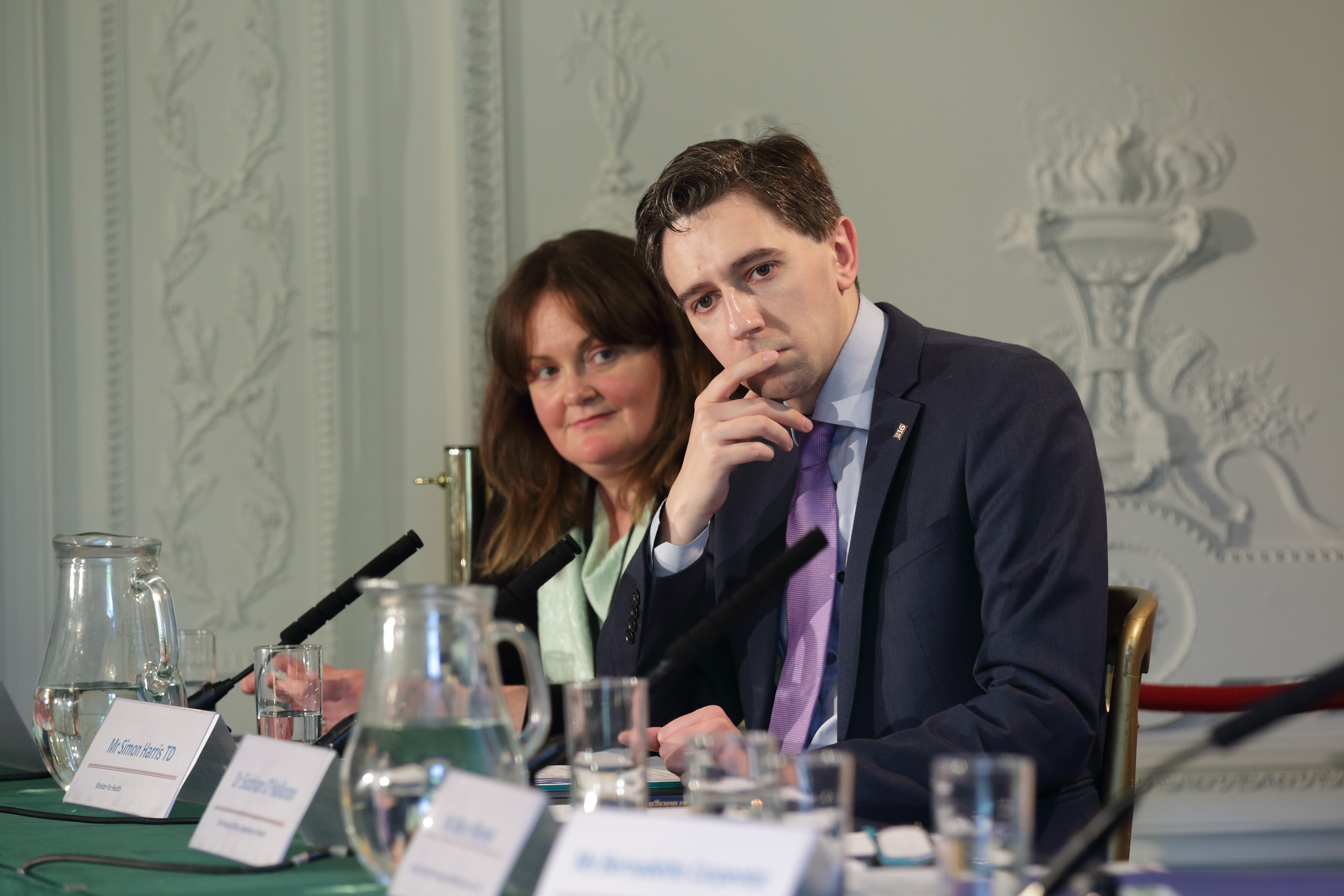
Harris as Minister for Health at the 'Reaffirming the Values of Nursing and Midwifery' Conference, 2016

Harris supported the legalisation of abortion in Ireland. He was the minister responsible for the Thirty-sixth Amendment of the Constitution, approved in a referendum, which removed the constitutional ban on abortion. He also introduced the Health (Regulation of Termination of Pregnancy) Act 2018 which permitted abortion under specified circumstances.

==== Cervical cancer ====
On 26 April 2018, the HSE confirmed that 206 women developed cervical cancer after having a screening test which was subsequently deemed to be potentially inaccurate on lookback, once a woman presented with a confirmed diagnosis of Cervical Cancer and given the known limitations of screening using smear technology. In the resulting scandal, Harris was criticised for his handling of the matter on multiple occasions.

In 2018, Harris intervened in the case of an 8-year-old Chinese boy who had been born in Dublin but was facing deportation. After an appeal to the Department of Justice, the boy was permitted to remain in Ireland.

==== Motion of no confidence ====
On 20 February 2019, Harris survived a motion of no-confidence over his handling of the rising costs (over €2 billion) of the new National Children's Hospital. The motion was voted down by 58 votes to 53 with 37 abstentions.

==== Health (Preservation and Protection) Act 2020 ====
Harris introduced the Health (Preservation and Protection and other Emergency Measures in the Public Interest) Act 2020, emergency legislation in response to the COVID-19 pandemic, which was enacted on 20 March 2020.

=== Micheál Martin government ===
On 27 June 2020, Harris was appointed as Minister for Further and Higher Education, Research, Innovation and Science, leading a new department in the government led by Micheál Martin. On 4 May 2022, he published "Funding our Future", a new policy on sustainably funding higher education and reducing the cost of third-level education for students and families.

Harris was the Fine Gael Director of Elections for councillor James Geoghegan's campaign in the 2021 Dublin Bay South by-election. Following Leo Varadkar's appointment as Taoiseach on 17 December 2022, he was re-appointed to the same position, as well as Minister for Justice on a temporary basis during the maternity leave of Helen McEntee.

== Taoiseach (2024–2025) ==
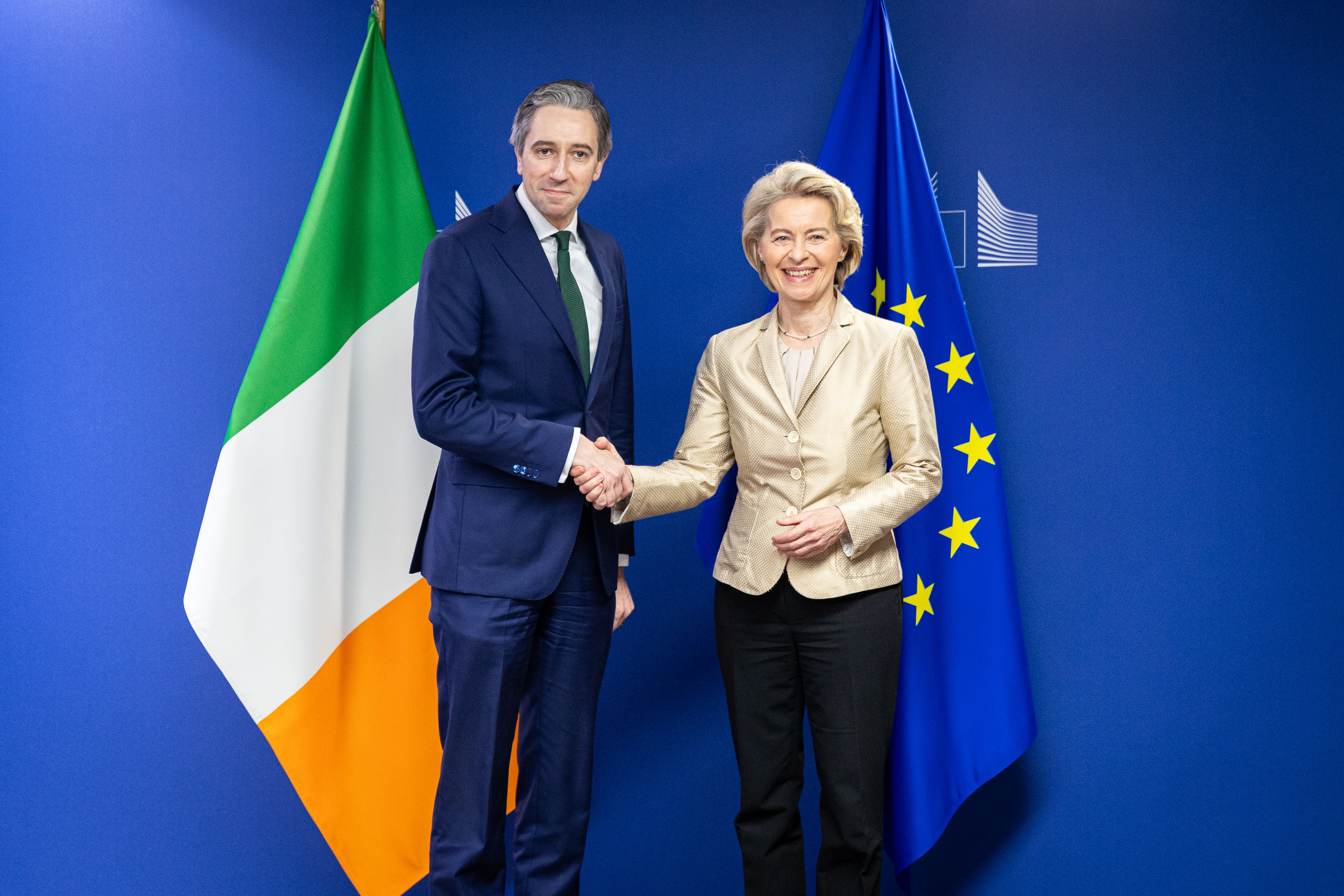
Harris with President of the European Commission Ursula von der Leyen in Brussels, 11 April 2024

=== Fine Gael leader ===
Leo Varadkar resigned as leader of Fine Gael on 20 March 2024, triggering a leadership election. Varadkar indicated that he would also resign as Taoiseach upon the election of the new Fine Gael leader. Nominations opened at 10 a.m. on 21 March 2024. By that afternoon, more than half of the Fine Gael parliamentary party had announced their support for Harris to be the next leader and all other cabinet ministers had ruled themselves out of the contest. Harris confirmed his intention to run for Fine Gael leader on the evening of 21 March 2024 on the Six One News. When the deadline for nominations was reached on 24 March 2024, Harris was the only candidate, and he was confirmed as leader at the party's meeting in Athlone the same day. Both other government parties have indicated that they wish the government to run its full term notwithstanding the change of leadership. Varadkar tendered his resignation as Taoiseach to the President on 8 April. The Dáil reconvened after the Easter recess on 9 April, when Harris was forwarded for the nomination of Taoiseach.

=== Entering government ===
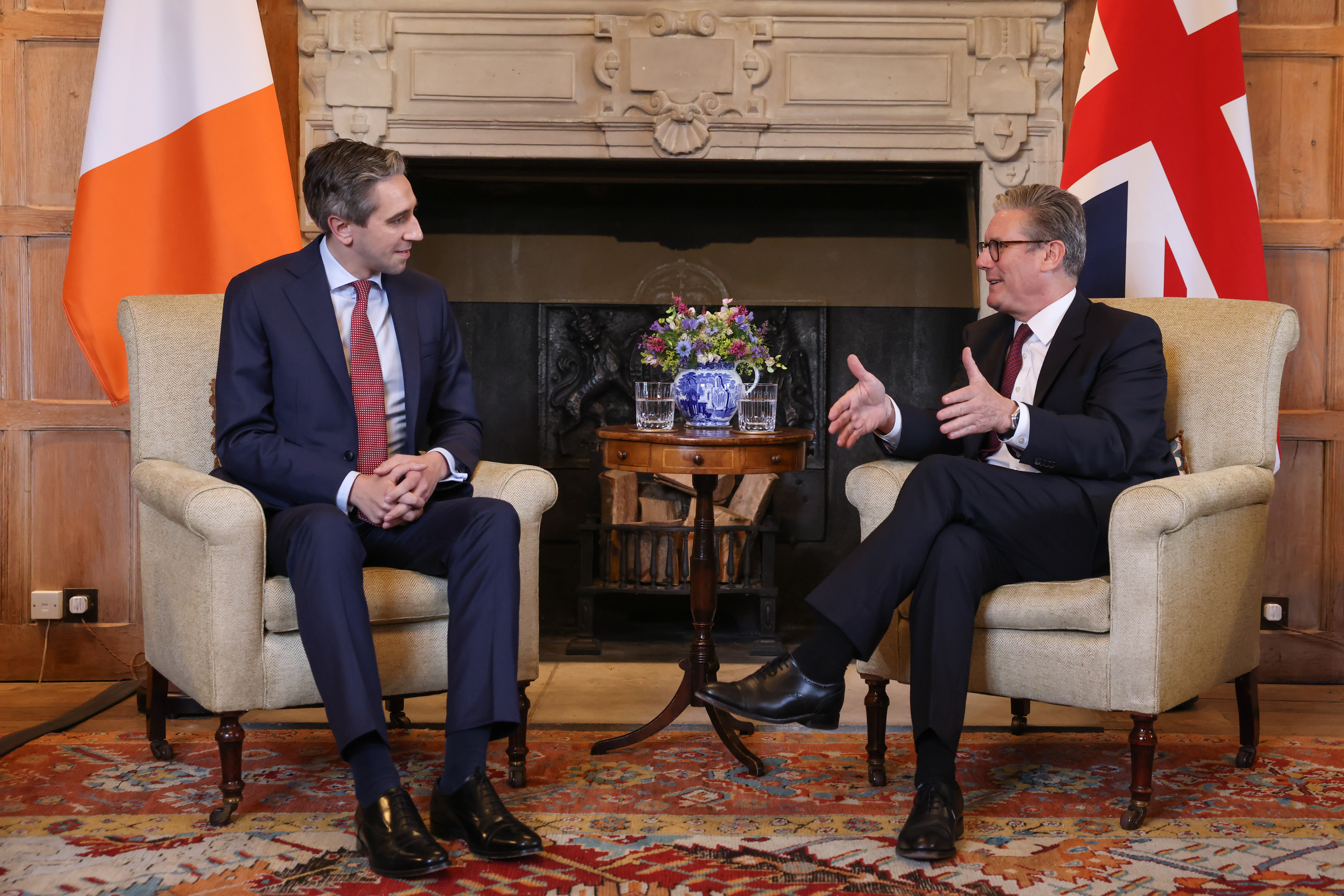
Harris with United Kingdom Prime Minister Keir Starmer, 17 July 2024

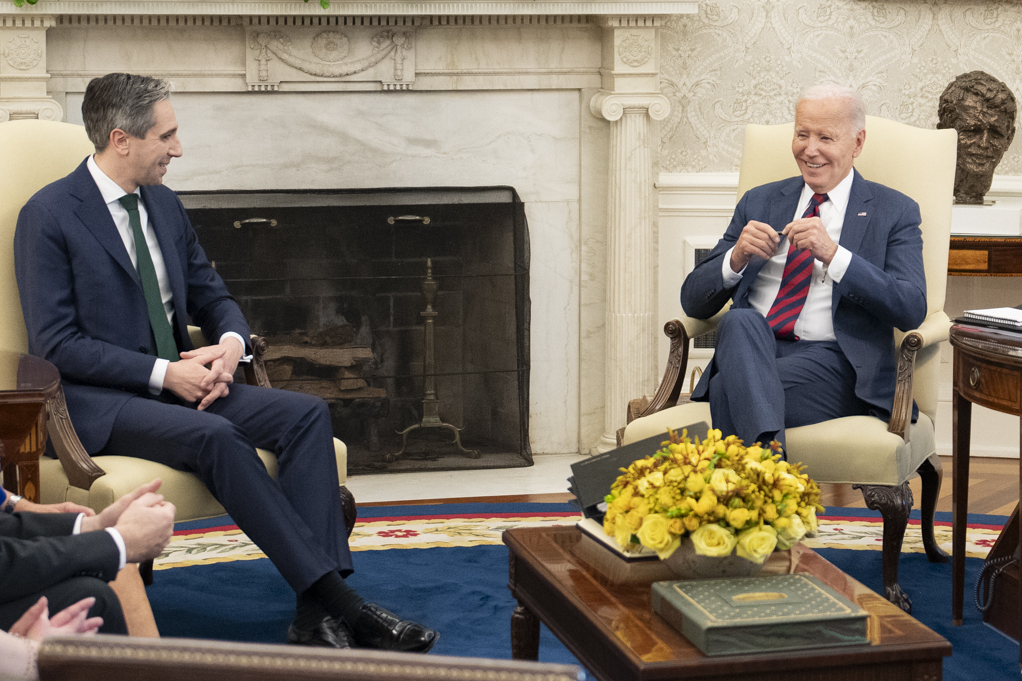
Harris with United States President Joe Biden, 9 October 2024

Following the resignation of Varadkar as Taoiseach on 8 April, Harris was nominated by the Dáil as Taoiseach on 9 April 2024, by a vote of 88 to 69. He received his appointment as Taoiseach by President Michael D. Higgins shortly afterwards as the youngest in the history of the state. Accepting the nomination of the Dáil, he paid tribute to his predecessor and acknowledged his status as the youngest elected officeholder, promising to be a "Taoiseach for all".

=== Cabinet ===
The cabinet formation of the 34th government was announced by Harris in the Dáil that evening; with the appointment of Peter Burke as Minister for Enterprise, Trade and Employment after Coveney's departure, likewise with Patrick O'Donovan as Minister for Further and Higher Education, Research, Innovation and Science in replacement of Harris.

=== Policy ===
Harris condemned the 2023 Hamas-led attack on Israel. He also criticised Israel's military operations in the Gaza Strip, saying "It's not about being pro-Israeli or pro-Palestinian. It's about being pro-international law. It's been about pro-human rights. It's been pro-peace. And I think what's happening in Gaza is unconscionable." Calling for a ceasefire in the Gaza war, Harris said: "40,000 dead in Gaza is a milestone the world must be ashamed of. International diplomacy has failed to protect innocent children, some only days old." Ireland announced the recognition of a Palestinian state on 28 May 2024, a move he described as "important and historic".

In April 2024, Harris said that Ireland would not provide a "loophole" for other countries' immigration issues. This followed an increase in migration of asylum seekers from the United Kingdom to Ireland via the Irish border, due to the Rwanda asylum plan. Harris dismissed British newspaper speculation that Ireland would join the Rwanda scheme, maintaining that Ireland would have its own immigration policy. In September 2024, Harris defended his statements linking homelessness and migration, by saying that the most common source of homelessness in Dublin was leaving direct provision.

=== General election ===
On 8 November 2024, after returning from a European Council meeting in Hungary, Harris sought a dissolution of the 33rd Dáil, which was granted by President Michael D. Higgins, and scheduled a general election for 29 November. In a speech at Government Buildings, Harris said "the time is now right to ask the Irish people to give a new mandate" and "if you give me your trust, I will give you my all".

On 22 November, during the final weekend of the campaign, Harris walked away from an exchange with Charlotte Fallon, a carer from St Joseph's Foundation, in Kanturk, County Cork. Fallon, a worker in a disability organisation, accused the government of neglecting carers and people with disabilities. Harris dismissed her claims, leading to a tense exchange and his abrupt departure after she called him "not a good man". The incident, captured on video by RTÉ News, drew criticism from activists and opposition politicians who condemned Harris for his dismissive response. Fallon later said she felt "shaken" and upset. Harris rang her the following morning to apologise, saying that he had been "harsh" and should have given her more time. Fine Gael deputy leader Helen McEntee defended Harris, citing the long day of campaigning.

Harris was re-elected to the Dáil on the first count. He resigned as Taoiseach on the morning of 18 December, which was the day of the first meeting of the 34th Dáil. Harris and the other members of the government continued to carry out their duties until their successors were appointed on 23 January 2025.

== Tánaiste (2025–present) ==
On 23 January 2025, Harris was appointed as Tánaiste, Minister for Foreign Affairs and Trade and Minister for Defence in the government led by Micheál Martin, following the 2024 general election.

On 18 November 2025 he was appointed as Minister for Finance following the resignation of Paschal Donohoe to take up the role of Managing Director and Chief Knowledge Officer of the World Bank.

== Personal life ==
In 2017, Harris married Caoimhe Wade, a cardiac nurse, at St Patrick's Church in Kilquade. They have two daughters and a son. Harris lives with Crohn's disease, but has said it has little impact on his day-to-day life.

Harris is the eldest of three siblings. His brother Adam is autistic and runs the autism services charity AsIAm, which Simon Harris co-founded.

Harris is noted for his social media presence, especially on TikTok, having been nicknamed the "TikTok Taoiseach". He used Instagram for live streams while Minister of Health during the COVID-19 pandemic, which was cited by the Irish Examiner as a rare occasion in which a government minister took questions from the general public.

Political offices
Preceded by Brian Hayes	Minister of State at the Department of Finance; 2014–2016	Succeeded by Eoghan Murphy
Preceded by Leo Varadkar	Minister for Health; 2016–2020	Succeeded by Stephen Donnelly
New office	Minister for Further and Higher Education, Research, Innovation and Science; 2020–2024	Succeeded by Patrick O'Donovan
Preceded by Heather Humphreys	Minister for Justice; December 2022–June 2023	Succeeded by Helen McEntee
Preceded by Leo Varadkar	Taoiseach; 2024–2025	Succeeded by Micheál Martin
Preceded by Micheál Martin	Tánaiste; 2025–present	Incumbent
Preceded by Micheál Martin	Minister for Foreign Affairs and Trade; 2025	Succeeded by Helen McEntee
Preceded by Micheál Martin	Minister for Defence; 2025	Succeeded by Helen McEntee
Preceded by Paschal Donohoe	Minister for Finance; 2025–present	Incumbent
Honorary titles
Preceded by Lucinda Creighton	Baby of the Dáil; 2011–2016	Succeeded by Jack Chambers
Party political offices
Preceded by Leo Varadkar	Leader of Fine Gael; 2024–present	Incumbent

Dáil	Election	Deputy (Party)	Deputy (Party)	Deputy (Party)	Deputy (Party)	Deputy (Party)
4th	1923	Christopher Byrne (CnaG)	James Everett (Lab)	Richard Wilson (FP)	3 seats 1923–1981	
5th	1927 (Jun)	Séamus Moore (FF)	James Everett (Lab)	Dermot O'Mahony (CnaG)	3 seats 1923–1981	
6th	1927 (Sep)	Séamus Moore (FF)	James Everett (Lab)	Dermot O'Mahony (CnaG)	3 seats 1923–1981	
7th	1932	Séamus Moore (FF)	James Everett (Lab)	Dermot O'Mahony (CnaG)	3 seats 1923–1981	
8th	1933	Séamus Moore (FF)	James Everett (Lab)	Dermot O'Mahony (CnaG)	3 seats 1923–1981	
9th	1937	Séamus Moore (FF)	James Everett (Lab)	Dermot O'Mahony (FG)	3 seats 1923–1981	
10th	1938	Séamus Moore (FF)	James Everett (Lab)	Patrick Cogan (Ind.)	3 seats 1923–1981	
11th	1943	Christopher Byrne (FF)	James Everett (Lab)	Patrick Cogan (CnaT)	3 seats 1923–1981	
12th	1944	Thomas Brennan (FF)	James Everett (NLP)	Patrick Cogan (CnaT)	3 seats 1923–1981	
13th	1948	Thomas Brennan (FF)	James Everett (NLP)	Patrick Cogan (Ind.)	3 seats 1923–1981	
14th	1951	Thomas Brennan (FF)	James Everett (Lab)	Patrick Cogan (Ind.)	3 seats 1923–1981	
14th	1953 by-election	Mark Deering (FG)	James Everett (Lab)	Patrick Cogan (Ind.)	3 seats 1923–1981	
15th	1954	Mark Deering (FG)	James Everett (Lab)	Paudge Brennan (FF)	3 seats 1923–1981	
16th	1957	James O'Toole (FF)	James Everett (Lab)	Paudge Brennan (FF)	3 seats 1923–1981	
17th	1961	Michael O'Higgins (FG)	James Everett (Lab)	Paudge Brennan (FF)	3 seats 1923–1981	
18th	1965	Michael O'Higgins (FG)	James Everett (Lab)	Paudge Brennan (FF)	3 seats 1923–1981	
18th	1968 by-election	Michael O'Higgins (FG)	Godfrey Timmins (FG)	Paudge Brennan (FF)	3 seats 1923–1981	
19th	1969	Liam Kavanagh (Lab)	Godfrey Timmins (FG)	Paudge Brennan (FF)	3 seats 1923–1981	
20th	1973	Liam Kavanagh (Lab)	Godfrey Timmins (FG)	Ciarán Murphy (FF)	3 seats 1923–1981	
21st	1977	Liam Kavanagh (Lab)	Godfrey Timmins (FG)	Ciarán Murphy (FF)	3 seats 1923–1981	
22nd	1981	Liam Kavanagh (Lab)	Godfrey Timmins (FG)	Ciarán Murphy (FF)	Paudge Brennan (FF)	4 seats 1981–1992
23rd	1982 (Feb)	Liam Kavanagh (Lab)	Godfrey Timmins (FG)	Ciarán Murphy (FF)	Gemma Hussey (FG)	4 seats 1981–1992
24th	1982 (Nov)	Liam Kavanagh (Lab)	Godfrey Timmins (FG)	Paudge Brennan (FF)	Gemma Hussey (FG)	4 seats 1981–1992
25th	1987	Liam Kavanagh (Lab)	Joe Jacob (FF)	Dick Roche (FF)	Gemma Hussey (FG)	4 seats 1981–1992
26th	1989	Liam Kavanagh (Lab)	Joe Jacob (FF)	Dick Roche (FF)	Godfrey Timmins (FG)	4 seats 1981–1992
27th	1992	Liam Kavanagh (Lab)	Joe Jacob (FF)	Liz McManus (DL)	Godfrey Timmins (FG)	Johnny Fox (Ind.)
27th	1995 by-election	Liam Kavanagh (Lab)	Joe Jacob (FF)	Liz McManus (DL)	Godfrey Timmins (FG)	Mildred Fox (Ind.)
28th	1997	Dick Roche (FF)	Joe Jacob (FF)	Liz McManus (DL)	Billy Timmins (FG)	Mildred Fox (Ind.)
29th	2002	Dick Roche (FF)	Joe Jacob (FF)	Liz McManus (Lab)	Billy Timmins (FG)	Mildred Fox (Ind.)
30th	2007	Dick Roche (FF)	Joe Behan (FF)	Liz McManus (Lab)	Billy Timmins (FG)	Andrew Doyle (FG)
31st	2011	Simon Harris (FG)	Stephen Donnelly (Ind.)	Anne Ferris (Lab)	Billy Timmins (FG)	Andrew Doyle (FG)
32nd	2016	Simon Harris (FG)	Stephen Donnelly (SD)	John Brady (SF)	Pat Casey (FF)	Andrew Doyle (FG)
33rd	2020	Simon Harris (FG)	Stephen Donnelly (FF)	John Brady (SF)	Jennifer Whitmore (SD)	Steven Matthews (GP)
34th	2024	Simon Harris (FG)	Edward Timmins (FG)	John Brady (SF)	Jennifer Whitmore (SD)	4 seats since 2024
