= Leo Varadkar =

Taoiseach (2017–2020, 2022–2024)

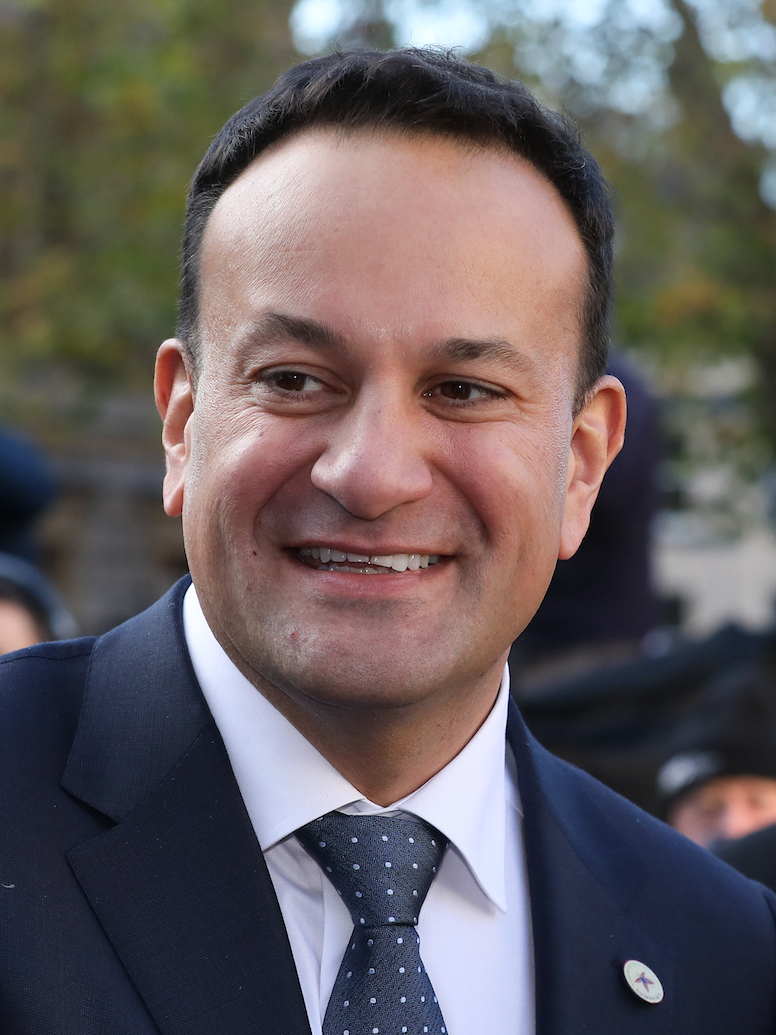
- Varadkar in 2022

Taoiseach
- In office 17 December 2022 – 9 April 2024
- President: Michael D. Higgins
- Tánaiste: Micheál Martin
- Preceded by: Micheál Martin
- Succeeded by: Simon Harris
- In office 14 June 2017 – 27 June 2020
- President: Michael D. Higgins
- Tánaiste: Frances Fitzgerald; Simon Coveney
- Preceded by: Enda Kenny
- Succeeded by: Micheál Martin

Tánaiste
- In office 27 June 2020 – 17 December 2022
- Taoiseach: Micheál Martin
- Preceded by: Simon Coveney
- Succeeded by: Micheál Martin

Leader of Fine Gael
- In office 2 June 2017 – 20 March 2024
- Deputy: Simon Coveney
- Preceded by: Enda Kenny
- Succeeded by: Simon Harris
Further ministerial offices
Minister for Enterprise, Trade and Employment
In office 27 June 2020 – 17 December 2022
Taoiseach	Micheál Martin
Preceded by	Heather Humphreys
Succeeded by	Simon Coveney
Minister for Defence
In office 14 June 2017 – 27 June 2020
Taoiseach	Himself
Preceded by	Enda Kenny
Succeeded by	Simon Coveney
Minister for Social Protection
In office 6 May 2016 – 14 June 2017
Taoiseach	Enda Kenny
Preceded by	Joan Burton
Succeeded by	Regina Doherty
Minister for Health
In office 11 July 2014 – 6 May 2016
Taoiseach	Enda Kenny
Preceded by	James Reilly
Succeeded by	Simon Harris
Minister for Transport, Tourism and Sport
In office 9 March 2011 – 11 July 2014
Taoiseach	Enda Kenny
Preceded by	Pat Carey
Succeeded by	Paschal Donohoe

Teachta Dála
- In office May 2007 – November 2024
- Constituency: Dublin West

Personal details
- Born: 18 January 1979 (age 47) Dublin, Ireland
- Party: Fine Gael
- Domestic partner: Matthew Barrett
- Education: Trinity College Dublin
- Website: Official website
- Leo Varadkar's voice Leo Varadkar's first speech following his nomination as Taoiseach by the Dáil; Recorded 14 June 2017

Leo Eric Varadkar (/vəˈrædkər/ və-RAD-kər; born 18 January 1979) is an Irish former Fine Gael politician who served as Taoiseach from 2017 to 2020 and from 2022 to 2024, as Tánaiste from 2020 to 2022, and as leader of Fine Gael from 2017 to 2024. A TD for the Dublin West constituency from 2007 to 2024, he held a range of other ministerial positions from 2011 to 2024. Described as centre-right economically, he advocated free markets, lower taxes, and welfare reform. On social issues, he supported successful constitutional referendums to legalise same-sex marriage and to liberalise Ireland's abortion laws.

Born in Dublin, Varadkar is the third child and first son in his multiracial family. His father Ashok is a doctor who was born and raised in Mumbai, India. His mother Miriam grew up on a farm in Dungarvan, County Waterford.

Varadkar studied medicine at Trinity College Dublin and worked as a non-consultant hospital doctor and general practitioner. A member of Fine Gael since his teenage years, he ran unsuccessfully in the 1999 local elections but was co-opted onto Fingal County Council in 2003.

He was elected to the council in the 2004 local elections, attaining the highest number of first-preference votes of any candidate in the country. First elected to Dáil Éireann in the 2007 general election, he was appointed to the cabinet of Taoiseach Enda Kenny following the 2011 general election, which saw Fine Gael return to government after 14 years in opposition. He served as Minister for Transport, Tourism and Sport from 2011 to 2014, Minister for Health from 2014 to 2016, and Minister for Social Protection from 2016 to 2017. During the campaign for the 2015 same-sex marriage referendum, he came out as gay, the first serving Irish minister to do so.

Following Kenny's resignation, Varadkar defeated Simon Coveney in the 2017 Fine Gael leadership election and was appointed Taoiseach on 14 June 2017. Aged 38, he was at that time the youngest Taoiseach in the history of the state. He became the first Taoiseach from an ethnic minority group, as well as Ireland's first, and the world's fifth, openly gay head of government. He led Fine Gael into the 2020 general election, in which the party won 35 seats, a loss of 15 seats since the 2016 general election. After lengthy negotiations, Fine Gael formed a three-party coalition government with Fianna Fáil and the Green Party, with the Fianna Fáil and Fine Gael party leaders rotating the offices of Taoiseach and Tánaiste.

Varadkar served as Tánaiste and Minister for Enterprise, Trade and Employment from June 2020 to December 2022, when he exchanged positions with Fianna Fáil leader Micheál Martin to begin his second term as Taoiseach. Citing personal and political reasons, he resigned as Fine Gael leader on 20 March 2024 and resigned as Taoiseach on 8 April; he was succeeded by Simon Harris. After deciding not to contest the 2024 general election, he retired from public life in November 2024. In April 2025, he took up a position as global advisor at Penta Group, a public-relations firm headquartered in Washington, D.C. In September 2025, he published his autobiography, Speaking My Mind.

== Early life ==
Born on 18 January 1979, in the Rotunda Hospital, Dublin, Varadkar is the third child and only son of Ashok and Miriam (née Howell) Varadkar. His father was born in Bombay (now Mumbai), India, and moved to the United Kingdom in the 1960s, to work as a doctor. His mother, born in Dungarvan, County Waterford, met her future husband while working as a nurse in Slough. Early in 1971, they married in the UK. Sophia, the elder of his two sisters, was born while the family lived in Leicester. They moved to India, before settling in Dublin in 1973, where his other sister, Sonia, was born.

Varadkar was educated at the St Francis Xavier national school in Blanchardstown and then The King's Hospital, a Church of Ireland secondary school in Palmerstown. At the age of 16, he joined Young Fine Gael. He was admitted to Trinity College Dublin (TCD), where he briefly studied law before switching to its School of Medicine. At TCD, he was active in the university's Young Fine Gael branch and served as vice-president of the Youth of the European People's Party, the youth wing of the European People's Party, of which Fine Gael is a member. Varadkar was selected for the Washington-Ireland Program, a half-year personal and professional development program in Washington, D.C., for students from Ireland. While there, he interned for the US House of Representatives.

Varadkar graduated in 2003, after completing his internship at KEM Hospital in Mumbai. He then spent several years working as a non-consultant hospital doctor in St. James's Hospital and Connolly Hospital, before specialising as a general practitioner in 2010.

== Early political career ==
=== Fingal County Council (2003–2007) ===
Varadkar was twenty years old and a second-year medical student when he unsuccessfully contested the 1999 local elections in the Mulhuddart local electoral area. Varadkar was co-opted to Fingal County Council in 2003, for the Castleknock local electoral area, as a replacement for Sheila Terry. At the 2004 local elections, he received the highest first-preference vote in the country with 4,894 votes and was elected on the first count.

=== Dáil Éireann (2007–2011) ===
Varadkar was elected to Dáil Éireann at the 2007 general election as a Fine Gael TD for the Dublin West constituency. After the 2007 general election, then Leader of the Opposition, Enda Kenny, appointed him to the front bench as spokesperson for Enterprise, Trade and Employment until a 2010 reshuffle, when he became spokesperson on Communications, Energy and Natural Resources. It was also during 2010 that Varadkar was reported to be a supporter of an attempt to oust Enda Kenny as leader of Fine Gael and replace him with Richard Bruton. The heave was not successful, but in the aftermath, Varadkar was able to repair his relationship with Kenny. At the 2011 general election, Varadkar was re-elected to the Dáil, with 8,359 first-preference votes (19.7%).

== Government minister (2011–2017) ==
=== Minister for Transport, Tourism, and Sport (2011–2014) ===
When Fine Gael formed a coalition government with the Labour Party, Varadkar was appointed Minister for Transport, Tourism and Sport on 9 March 2011. This appointment was considered a surprise, as Varadkar was not known as a sports lover. He said that while he knew "a lot of facts... I don't play the sports."

In May 2011, Varadkar suggested Ireland was "very unlikely" to resume borrowing in 2012 and might need a second bailout, causing jitters on international markets about Ireland's credibility. Many of his cabinet colleagues frowned on Varadkar's forthrightness, as did the European Central Bank. Taoiseach Enda Kenny repeated the line of the Government of Ireland, that the State would not require a further bailout from the European Union or the International Monetary Fund, and said he had warned all ministers against publicly disparaging the economy. Varadkar said that reaction to the story was hyped up but that he was not misquoted. The Evening Herald repeatedly described Varadkar as gaffe-prone.

=== Minister for Health (2014–2016) ===
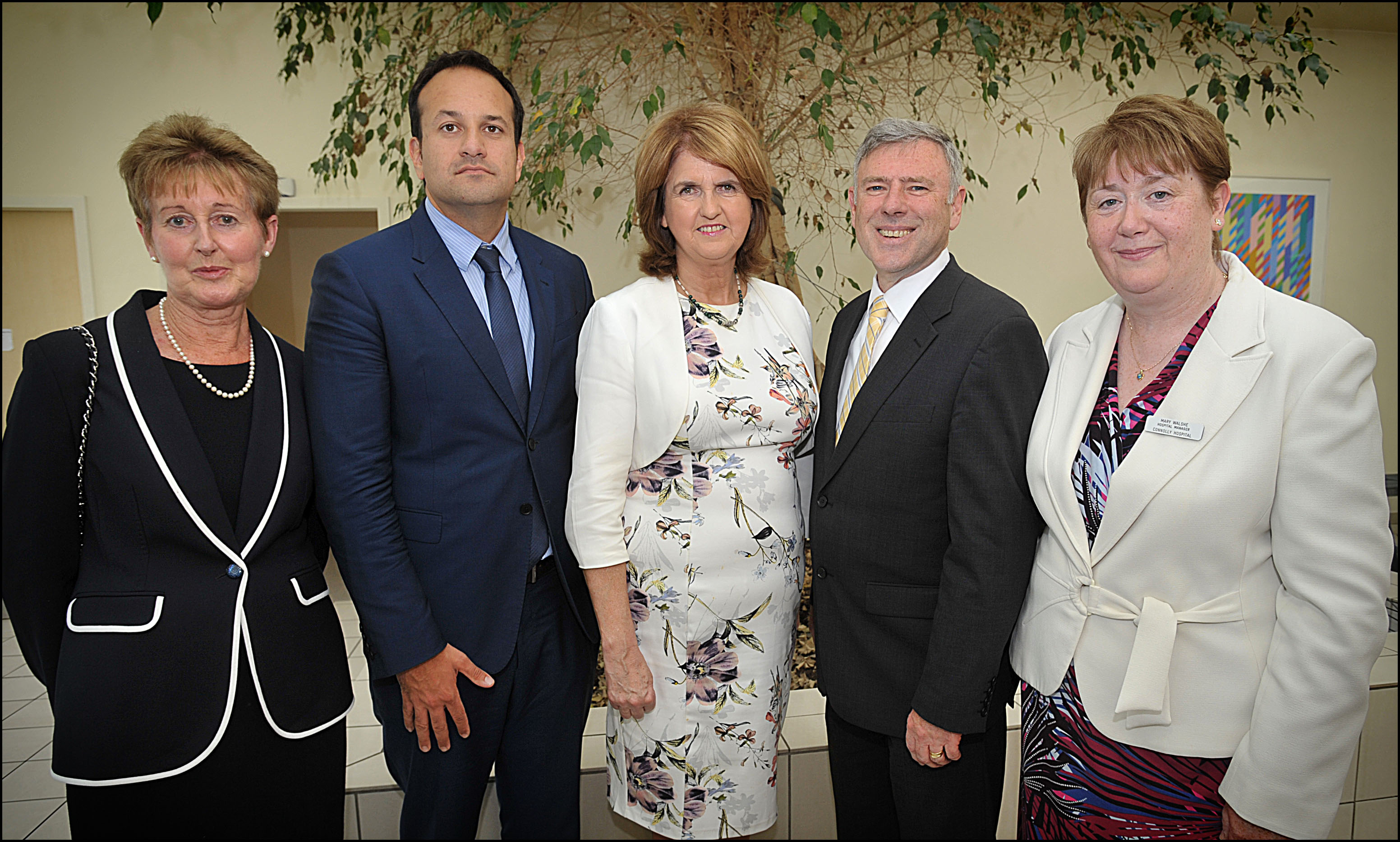
Health Minister Varadkar with Tánaiste Joan Burton at the opening of a unit at Connolly Hospital, Blanchardstown, July 2014

In the cabinet reshuffle of July 2014, Varadkar replaced James Reilly as Minister for Health.

Varadkar was returned to the Dáil at the 2016 general election. He retained the health portfolio in an acting capacity until May of that year, due to the delay in government formation. In one of his final acts as Minister for Health, Varadkar cut €12 million from the €35 million allocated to that year's budget for mental health care, telling the Dáil that the cuts were "necessary as the funding could be better used elsewhere."

=== Minister for Social Protection (2016–2017) ===
On 6 May 2016, after government formation talks had concluded, Taoiseach Enda Kenny appointed Varadkar as Minister for Social Protection. During his time in the ministry, he launched a controversial campaign against welfare fraud called "Welfare Cheats Cheat Us All. It was labelled a "hate campaign" by a former social welfare inspector, who claimed the campaign was "all about [Varadkar's] aspirations to be leader".

== First term as Taoiseach (2017–2020) ==
=== 2017 ===
Varadkar and the prime minister of Canada, Justin Trudeau, delivering joint remarks in July 2017

On 2 June 2017, Varadkar was elected leader of Fine Gael, defeating Simon Coveney. Although Coveney had the support of more Fine Gael members than Varadkar, the electoral college system more strongly weighted the votes of the party's parliamentarians, with these strongly backing Varadkar.

Like Enda Kenny's second term, Varadkar relied upon the support of Independents and the abstention of Fianna Fáil TDs to support his bid for Taoiseach. On 14 June 2017, he was elected as Taoiseach in a 57–50 vote with 47 abstentions. He became Ireland's first openly gay Taoiseach, as well as the youngest; however, he is not the youngest head of an Irish government, as both Éamon de Valera and Michael Collins were younger on assuming their respective offices in revolutionary governments prior to the establishment of the state. He is also the first head of government who is of half-Indian descent. It was also the first time that one Fine Gael Taoiseach was succeeded by another. (Note: By the end of August 1922, only two heads of government from the pro-Treaty Sinn Féin party had died in office: Arthur Griffith (who died on 12 August 1922) and Michael Collins (who died on 22 August 1922). They were succeeded by W. T. Cosgrave of the same pro-Treaty Sinn Féin faction; after being known as Cumann na nGaedheal from 1923 to 1933, it merged with two smaller parties in 1933 to form Fine Gael, which was soon led by Cosgrave from 1934 to 1944. This was before the title of Taoiseach was adopted under the 1937 Constitution, before the name Fine Gael was adopted in 1933, and the state came into internationally recognised existence on 6 December 1922.)

One of Varadkar's first acts as Taoiseach was to announce a referendum on abortion for 2018. He said that the government would also lay out a road map for achieving a low-carbon economy.

His government nearly collapsed as a result of the Garda whistleblower scandal and Tánaiste (Deputy Prime Minister) Frances Fitzgerald's role in it. Fianna Fáil, the main opposition party, who were in a confidence-and-supply agreement with Fine Gael, threatened a motion of no confidence in the government. After days of gridlock, the crisis was averted, after Fitzgerald resigned from the cabinet to prevent triggering an election that could jeopardise the Irish position in Brexit negotiations. Shortly after this, Varadkar appointed former leadership rival and Minister for Foreign Affairs and Trade Simon Coveney as Tánaiste, Heather Humphreys as Minister for Business, Enterprise and Innovation and Josepha Madigan as Minister for Culture, Heritage and the Gaeltacht, in a small reshuffle of the cabinet.

Shortly after the Fitzgerald crisis, an impasse was reached in the Brexit talks, as Arlene Foster, leader of the Democratic Unionist Party, objected to a deal agreed to by Varadkar, British Prime Minister Theresa May, and President of the European Commission Jean-Claude Juncker. This prevented an agreement from being reached as the deadline approached. Varadkar stated he was "surprised and disappointed" the UK could not reach a deal. Later in the week, a consensus deal was finalised. Varadkar stated he had received guarantees from the UK there would be no hard border between Ireland and Northern Ireland. He later said he and his cabinet had "achieved all we set out to achieve" during the talks before quoting former British prime minister Winston Churchill, by saying "This is not the end but it is the end of the beginning". An Irish Times poll taken during these days showed Varadkar with a 53% approval rating, the highest for any Taoiseach since 2011, and showed Fine Gael with an eleven-point lead over Fianna Fáil. Government satisfaction was also at 41%, the highest in almost 10 years. Irish Times columnist Pat Leahy claimed Varadkar had ended 2017 "on a high" and IrishCentral called it the Taoiseach's "finest hour".

=== 2018 ===
In January 2018, his opinion poll approval ratings reached 60%, a ten-year high for any Taoiseach.

In January 2018, he announced that the referendum to repeal Ireland's 8th Amendment which prevented any liberalisation of restrictive abortion laws would take place in May. If passed, it would allow the government to introduce new legislation. It was proposed that women would be allowed unrestricted access to abortion up until 12 weeks, with exceptions if the mother's life is in danger up until six months. Varadkar said he would campaign for liberalising the laws, saying his mind was changed by difficult cases during his tenure as Minister for Health. The referendum passed with 66% of the votes.

Varadkar was included in Time magazine's 100 Most Influential People of 2018.

=== 2019 ===
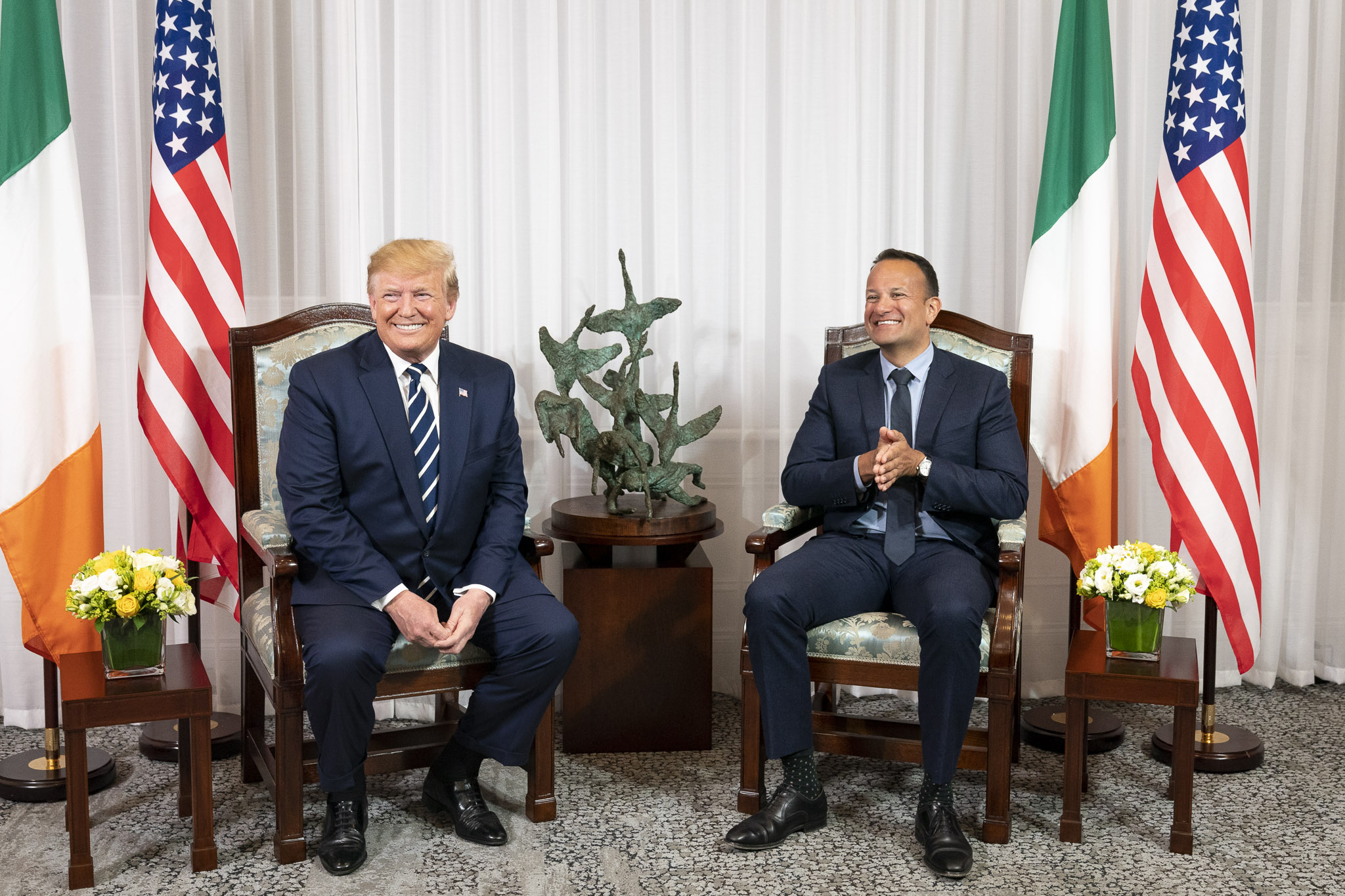
Varadkar and US president Donald Trump in Shannon, Ireland in June 2019

On 24 January 2019, Varadkar said in an interview with Euronews that he was standing firm on the Irish backstop and called Brexit an act of self-harm that was not fully thought through. He also said the technology promised by the Brexiteers to solve the Northern Ireland border issue "doesn't yet exist".

Varadkar stated he will refuse to ratify the EU–Mercosur free trade agreement unless Brazil commits to protecting the environment. The fear is that the deal could lead to more deforestation of the Amazon rainforest as it expands market access to Brazilian beef.

=== 2020 ===
On 14 January 2020, Varadkar sought a dissolution of the 32nd Dáil, which was granted by President Michael D. Higgins, and scheduled a general election for 8 February. In that election, Varadkar was re-elected in the Dublin West constituency, but Fine Gael fell to 35 seats, 15 fewer than in 2016, and falling to third place behind Fianna Fáil (38 seats) and Sinn Féin (37 seats). Varadkar ruled out any possibility of a Fine Gael–Sinn Féin coalition during the election campaign, though a "grand coalition" of Fianna Fáil and Fine Gael was floated as a final possibility. However, on 12 February, Varadkar conceded that Fine Gael had lost the election and that he was very likely to become the next Opposition Leader. Varadkar added that Fine Gael was "willing to step back" to allow Sinn Féin, as the winner of the popular vote, to have the first opportunity to form a government. On 20 February, Varadkar offered his resignation to President Higgins at Áras an Uachtaráin, pursuant to the constitution, remaining, however, as Taoiseach until the formation of a new government.

During this period, the COVID-19 pandemic arrived in Ireland. While in Washington, D.C., ahead of Saint Patrick's Day, Varadkar announced measures intended to stop COVID-19 spreading, including the closure of all schools, universities and childcare facilities from the following day, as well as the closure of all cultural institutions and the cancellation of "all indoor mass gatherings of more than 100 people and outdoor mass gatherings of more than 500 people". After returning home early, Varadkar addressed the nation on Saint Patrick's night during A Ministerial Broadcast by An Taoiseach Leo Varadkar, TD, introducing television viewers to the concept of "cocooning", i.e. "At a certain point... we will advise the elderly and people who have a long-term illness to stay at home for several weeks". The speech was the most watched television event in Irish history, surpassing the previous record held by The Late Late Toy Show by an additional total of about 25% and was widely distributed globally. It was also plagiarised by Irish businessman Peter Bellew, the chief operating officer at British low-cost airline group EasyJet.

In response to a March 2020 Health Service Executive appeal to healthcare professionals, Varadkar rejoined the medical register and offered to work as a doctor one day each week.

=== Formation of three-party coalition government ===
A draft programme for government was agreed between Fianna Fáil, Fine Gael, and the Green Party on 15 June 2020. It was determined that the position of Taoiseach would rotate between Micheál Martin and Leo Varadkar. The programme needed the approval by each party's membership. Fianna Fáil and the Green Party require a simple majority and a two-thirds vote, respectively, in a postal ballot of all members, while Fine Gael uses an electoral college system, with its parliamentary party making up 50% of the electorate, constituency delegates 25%, councillors 15% and the party's executive council filling the final 10%.

On 26 June, Fine Gael voted 80%, Fianna Fáil voted 74% and the Green Party voted 76% in favour of the programme. Clare Bailey, the leader of the Green Party in Northern Ireland – a branch of the Irish Green Party – publicly rejected the idea of the Greens being part of the coalition deal with Fianna Fáil and Fine Gael. She said the coalition deal proposed the "most fiscally conservative arrangements in a generation". The coalition deal allowed for a government to be formed on 27 June, with Fianna Fáil leader Micheál Martin taking over as Taoiseach. He was appointed by President Michael D. Higgins on 27 June, marking the end of Varadkar's first term.

== Government minister (2020–2022) ==
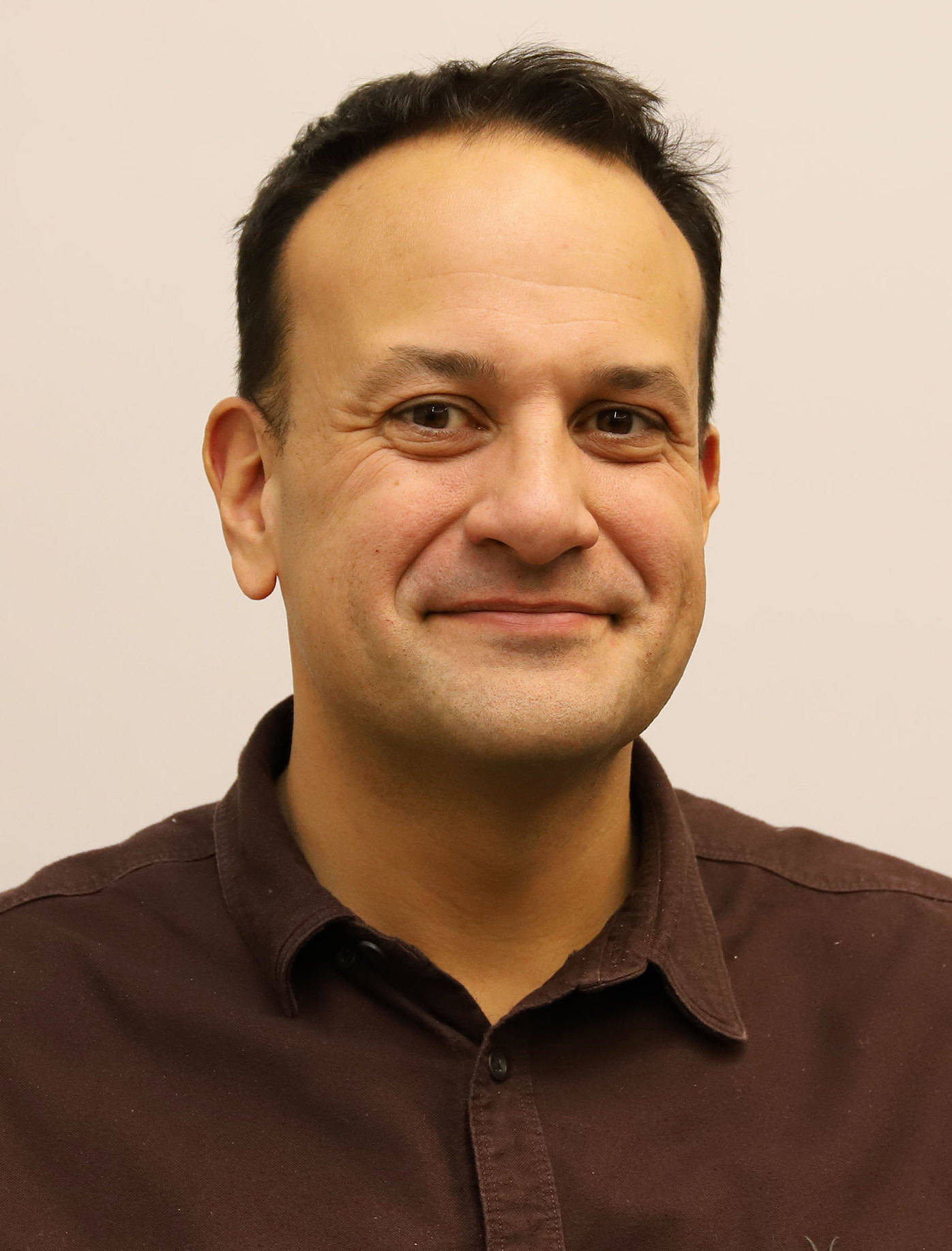
Official portrait, 2020

=== Tánaiste and Minister for Enterprise, Trade and Employment ===
Varadkar was appointed as Tánaiste and Minister for Enterprise, Trade and Employment by his successor, Micheál Martin. It was agreed then that they would exchange positions in December 2022, with Varadkar retaking the position of Taoiseach for the remainder of the coalition's term.

=== GP contract leak ===
On 31 October 2020, Village published an article alleging that Varadkar had leaked confidential documents, including a draft contract between the Health Service Executive and general practitioners that was agreed but still subject to acceptance by GPs at the time, and officially unavailable to members of the Oireachtas. The article included screenshots of WhatsApp messages, including one with a photo of the cover of the leaked document, and alleged the handwriting visible was Varadkar's. While Village claimed the leaks might be unlawful, Varadkar denied this was the case and described the article as "inaccurate and grossly defamatory". He said that the provision of the agreement by an informal communication channel was not the best practice.

In response to the claims by Village, the Green Party called for Varadkar to give a detailed account to the Dáil in response to the accusations. This request was seconded by Sinn Féin's health spokesperson, stating: "The facts for me here are clear – Leo, as the leader of Fine Gael and Taoiseach at the time, passed on a document to a friend about sensitive negotiations involving hundreds of millions of euro of taxpayers' money." Varadkar's Fine Gael colleague Paschal Donohoe also expressed a desire for Varadkar to answer questions in the Dáil. Varadkar apologised in the Dáil for "errors of judgement" in sharing a copy of the contract, and rejected any suggestion that he had anything to gain personally from giving the IMO document to the NAGP president as "false and deeply offensive". The leak was the subject of a criminal investigation. In April 2022, a file was submitted to the director of public prosecutions (DPP) for review. On 6 July 2022, the DPP decided that Varadkar would not face prosecution.

== Second term as Taoiseach (2022–2024) ==
=== 2022 ===
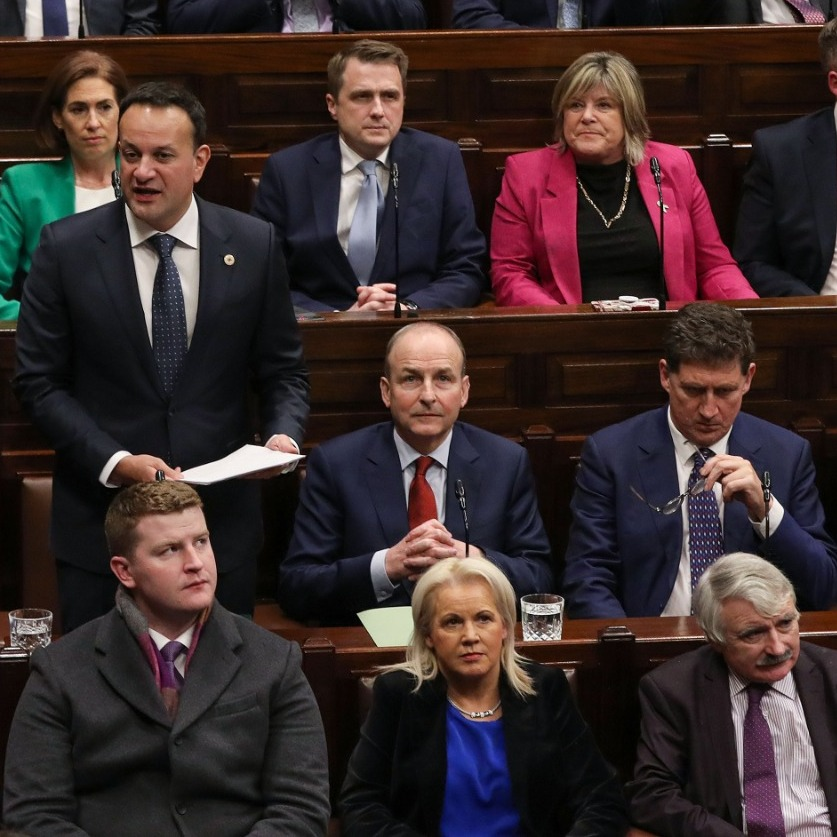
Varadkar beside his coalition partners Micheál Martin and Eamon Ryan in December 2022

On 17 December 2022, Varadkar was appointed as Taoiseach for a second time, following Micheál Martin's resignation to President Michael D. Higgins.

=== 2023 ===
On 13 April 2023, Varadkar met with U.S. president Joe Biden at Farmleigh House during his four-day visit to the island of Ireland.

On 6 May 2023, Varadkar, along with President Michael D. Higgins, attended the Coronation of Charles III and Camilla, marking the first time a serving taoiseach attended the coronation of a British monarch.

On 23 November 2023, a mass stabbing outside a primary school in Parnell Square East, Dublin happened, with a five-year-old girl and a woman in her 30s were seriously injured, and three others hurt. Following the knife attack, a riot took place in Dublin city centre due to the assailant being born in Algeria. Leo Varadkar responded, saying he was "shocked" by the knife attack and praised the emergency services for responding "very quickly". He said later that the rioters had brought "shame" to Dublin for their families and themselves, and were not motivated by patriotism but by "hate" and their "love" of "violence", "chaos", and "causing pain to others", and pledged to use the "full resources of the law, the full machinery of the state to punish those involved" in what he called "grotesque events". Varadkar also pledged to pass new laws to enable police "to make better use of" CCTV evidence and "modernise" laws regarding hate and incitement.

=== 2024 ===
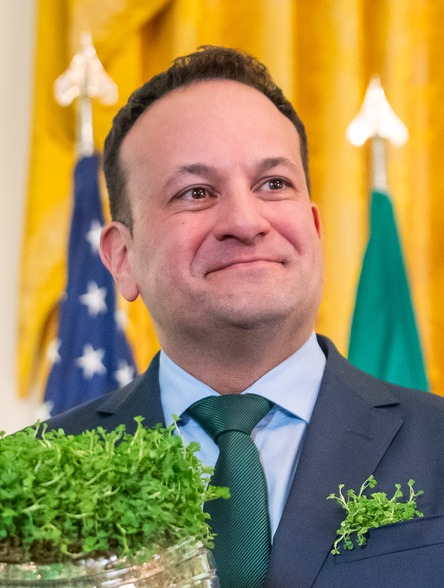
Varadkar on Saint Patrick's Day at the White House, in 2024

In March 2024, two referendums were held on proposed amendments to the Constitution of Ireland. The Thirty-ninth Amendment of the Constitution (The Family) Bill 2023 proposed to revise the definition of family to include durable relationships outside marriage. The Fortieth Amendment of the Constitution (Care) Bill 2023 proposed to remove references to a woman's "life within the home" and "duties in the home" and add a new article on care within the family. Voters overwhelmingly rejected both proposed amendments, delivering a rebuke to a government and in the eyes of many, personally to Varadkar.

==== Resignation and succession ====
On 20 March 2024, Varadkar announced his intention to step down as Taoiseach and Fine Gael leader, saying that he was no longer "the best person for the job". He said his "reasons for stepping down are both personal and political". He said that his resignation as Fine Gael leader would be with immediate effect, and that he would continue in office as Taoiseach pending the appointment of his successor. On 24 March, Simon Harris was elected unopposed in the 2024 Fine Gael leadership election. On 8 April, Varadkar submitted his resignation to President Higgins. The Dáil nomination for Taoiseach was held on 9 April, leading to the appointment of Harris as the new Taoiseach by President Michael D. Higgins.

On 16 July, Varadkar announced that he would not stand for re-election at the next general election, and would retire from politics.

== Political views and profile ==
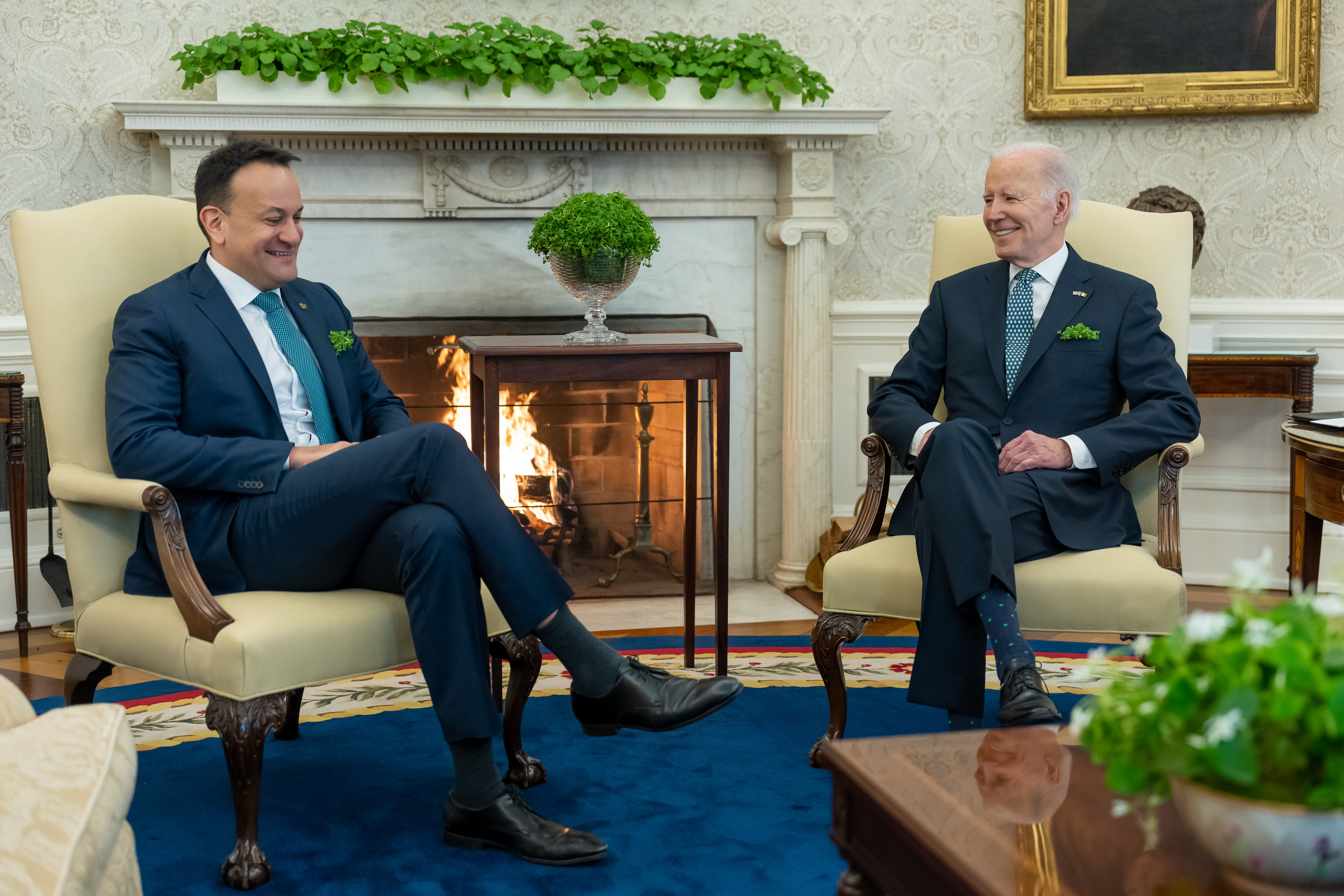
Varadkar with U.S. president Joe Biden on St Patrick's Day in 2023

After becoming a Teachta Dála in 2007, Varadkar developed a reputation in the late 2000s and early 2010s as somewhat of an outspoken maverick. Just one week into his role as a TD, Varadkar branded sitting Taoiseach Bertie Ahern "cunning and devious" in the Dáil. In 2011, he upset a number of his own party colleagues when he negatively compared embattled Fianna Fáil leader and Taoiseach Brian Cowen to former Fine Gael leader and Taoiseach Garret FitzGerald. By 2012, Varadkar's tendency to make "off the cuff" remarks led to the Evening Herald describing him as "gaffe-prone". In 2017, Irish Times columnist Stephen Collins described Varadkar as "coming across to the public, especially younger voters, as if he is not a politician at all". In 2022, the New York Times noted that "critics have pointed to Mr. Varadkar's stiffness of manner and tendency to speak his mind, to the point of insensitivity".

In 2010, the Irish Examiner described Varadkar as "conservative" while that same year the Irish magazine Hot Press described his policy positions as "radical right", although in the same article, he described himself as "centre-right", which he defined as "to be somebody who is right of centre is somebody who has broadly liberal-conservative/Christian-democrat ideals, and the basic principles of that is that before you can distribute wealth you have to create it. So the first thing that you need to do is set up an environment in which wealth can be created, and then it's the role of the government to distribute it reasonably equitably." In 2017, the Guardian stated that "Varadkar's centre-right politics are clearly conservative". In 2022, the political magazine the Phoenix suggested that in 2010 Varadkar was the ideological leader of a "hard-right" faction within Fine Gael who unsuccessfully sought to replace leader Enda Kenny with Richard Bruton, but over the course of the next decade Varadkar was brought further and further into the political centre.

In 2011, Varadkar cited Ryanair CEO Michael O'Leary as the Irish person he most admired due to his forthrightness, and Otto von Bismarck as a historic figure he admired, crediting Bismarck as a conservative who was able to enact social reforms. In 2021 Varadkar gave a dedicated lecture on Noël Browne to students of Trinity College Dublin, in which he summarised Browne's career. Varadkar noted Browne's cantankerous reputation but generally praised Browne, with Varadkar stating that he always "admired his idealism, his passion, and his determination to stand up for the causes and the people he believed in".

=== Economy ===
Varadkar is a proponent of tax cuts and welfare reform, and supports investment in Ireland by multinational corporations such as Apple Inc, alongside keeping Ireland's corporate tax rate low. During his time as Minister for Social Protection in 2016 and 2017, Varadkar launched the "Welfare Cheats Cheat Us All" campaign, aimed at those committing welfare fraud.

=== Foreign policy ===
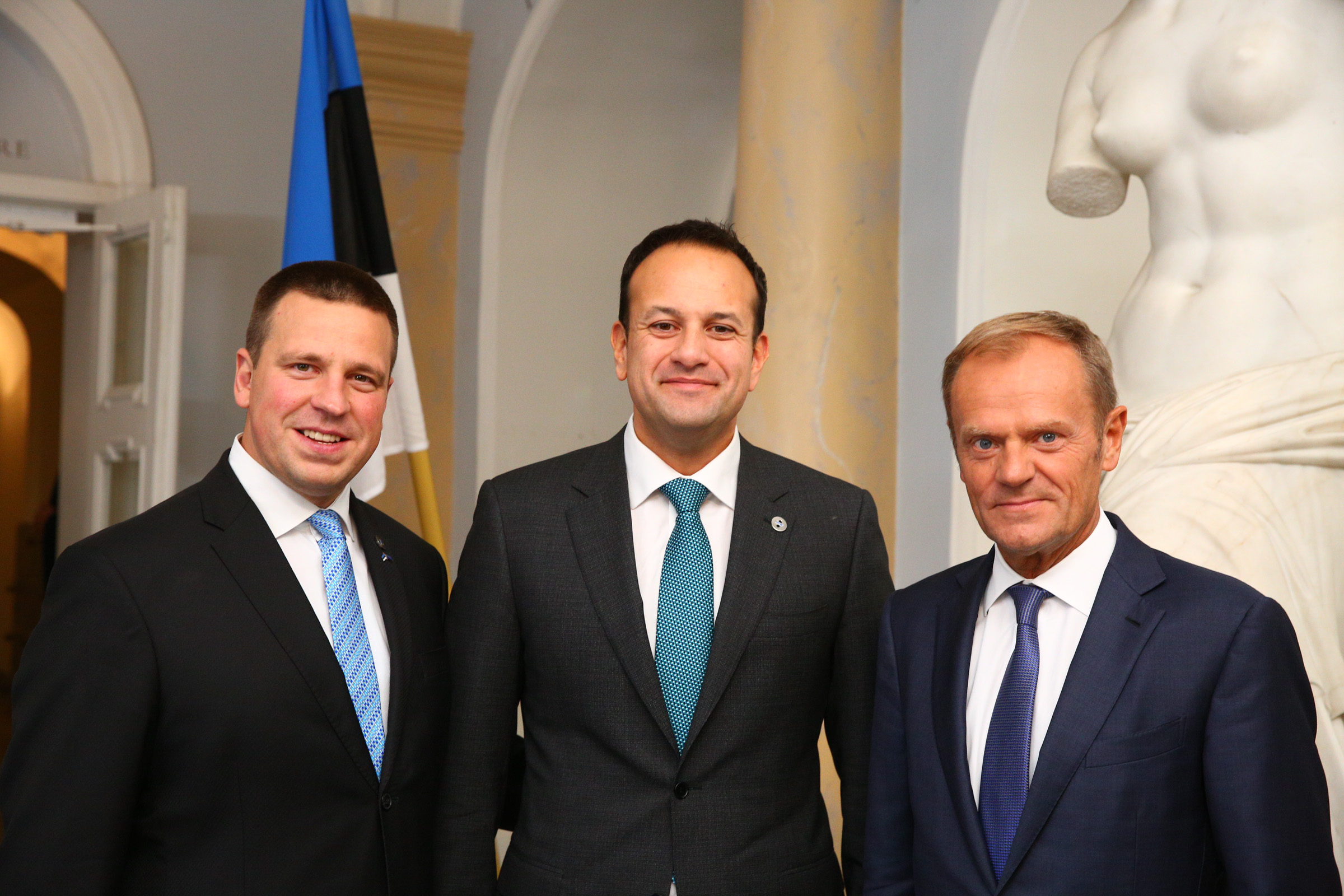
Varadkar alongside Jüri Ratas, the prime minister of Estonia, and Donald Tusk, President of the European Council, in 2017

Varadkar, alongside his party Fine Gael, universally opposed Brexit, and much of his time during his first tenure as Taoiseach was spent in negotiations with the British government over how the shared border between the United Kingdom and the Republic of Ireland would operate.

Varadkar is a supporter of CETA, a proposed free trade agreement between Canada and the European Union. However, Varadkar has faced opposition to many aspects of the agreement, not just from opposition parties, but also members of his own government coalition, especially members of the Green party who object in particular to a proposed "investment court" system. Critics of the agreement fear the investment court could be used to strike down environmentalist laws.

In October 2023, he condemned October 7 attacks, saying, "The [Irish] government condemns it unreservedly, there can be no excuse for targeting women, children, taking children and women, civilians as hostage". Varadkar also urged "restraint" from the Israeli government, saying that "the free world is standing in solidarity with Israel", but that could change if the Israeli response "results in unnecessary civilian deaths in Gaza".

Varadkar later criticised Israel's blockade of the Gaza Strip and what he called the "collective punishment" of people in Gaza. In November, he commented on the release of 8-year-old Irish-Israeli citizen Emily Hand, who had been kidnapped by Hamas, saying, "An innocent child who was lost has now been found and returned... A little girl was snatched from her home and held captive for almost seven weeks. She spent her ninth birthday as a hostage." He was criticised for the use of the phrases "lost" and "found" by Israel's foreign minister Eli Cohen. Varadkar rejected calls to boycott the Eurovision Song Contest 2024 due to Israel's participation. In January 2024, he expressed doubts about South Africa's genocide case against Israel. In March 2024, he resisted calls to boycott a planned Saint Patrick's Day (17 March) meeting with the American president Joe Biden, who has been the target of fierce criticism in Ireland over his stance on the Gaza war; Varadkar noted "differences of opinions [between the U.S. and Ireland] in relation to Israel and Gaza".

=== LGBT issues ===
In a 2010 interview, Varadkar stated that while he did not consider homosexuality morally wrong, he opposed same-sex marriage, although he supported civil partnerships. However, following the public acknowledgement of his homosexuality in January 2015, he began advocating for same-sex marriage during the national debate in the prelude to the 2015 referendum on same-sex marriage.

In 2022, Varadkar stated that he was in support of the transgender community, and credited a gender recognition legislation brought into law during the Fine Gael/Labour government of 2011 to 2016 as a "huge step forward" in terms of Irish transgender issues.

=== Abortion ===
In 2010, Varadkar stated that he opposed abortion, that he was not in favour of introducing new legislation on abortion, and that he opposed abortion in cases of rape because he felt it would lead to "abortion on demand". However, by 2014, Varadkar had changed his position and began arguing in the Dáil in favour of abortion up to 12 weeks, and more if the mother's life was in danger. During the national debate that occurred before the referendum on abortion in 2018, Varadkar said that there had been a "fundamental shift" in his views on abortion over the years, and repudiated his 2010 opposition to it.

=== Immigration ===
In 2010, Varadkar was an advocate of a scheme in which immigrants to Ireland would be paid to return to their country of origin. Varadkar suggested that at the time of the Nice Treaty referendums in Ireland in the early 2000s, the public were told there would not be large-scale immigration to Ireland in the aftermath, but this was not the case, before further suggesting that Ireland had not been suitably prepared for the amount of immigration it experienced during the Celtic Tiger period.

In a 2022 interview, Varadkar was critical of British politician Priti Patel in her role as Home Secretary, stating that her plan to "send asylum seekers to Rwanda is disgusting". In the same interview, Varadkar stated "I have always been supportive of migration" and "supportive of accepting refugees from war-torn countries", although he said he made the distinction between "people who come here legally and contribute to our society, and those who come here illegally and seek to gain status through subterfuge or falsehood". In June 2022, Varadkar began hosting a Ukrainian refugee in his home.

In January 2023, Varadkar announced that his government would be looking at ways to strengthen border control against illegal immigration.

== Personal life ==
Varadkar is the first Irish government leader of partly Indian origin and has visited India on a number of occasions. He completed his medical internship at KEM Hospital in his father's childhood city of Mumbai.

During an interview on RTÉ Radio on 18 January 2015 (his 36th birthday), Varadkar spoke publicly for the first time about being gay: "it's not something that defines me. I'm not a half-Indian politician, or a doctor politician or a gay politician for that matter. It's just part of who I am, it doesn't define me, it is part of my character I suppose". Varadkar was a prominent advocate of the same-sex marriage referendum. His partner, Matthew Barrett, is a doctor at Mater Misericordiae University Hospital.

In 2017, Varadkar completed a course in professional Irish, and devised an Irish language form for his surname, de Varad. He has said, "My philosophy towards Irish is just to speak it! Speak Irish! It's not about getting it perfect – it's about having fun and making an effort to speak it."

Varadkar was raised in a Catholic household. He is non-religious, but finds religion "fascinating".

In September 2025, Varadkar published an autobiography, Speaking My Mind.

== See also ==
- List of openly LGBT heads of state and government

== Notes ==
Political offices
Preceded by Pat Carey	Minister for Transport, Tourism and Sport; 2011–2014	Succeeded by Paschal Donohoe
Preceded by James Reilly	Minister for Health; 2014–2016	Succeeded by Simon Harris
Preceded by Joan Burton	Minister for Social Protection; 2016–2017	Succeeded by Regina Doherty
Preceded by Enda Kenny	Taoiseach; 2017–2020	Succeeded by Micheál Martin
Preceded by Enda Kenny	Minister for Defence; 2017–2020	Succeeded by Simon Coveney
Preceded by Simon Coveney	Tánaiste; 2020–2022	Succeeded by Micheál Martin
Preceded by Heather Humphreys as Business, Enterprise and Innovation	Minister for Enterprise, Trade and Employment; 2020–2022	Succeeded by Simon Coveney
Preceded by Micheál Martin	Taoiseach; 2022–2024	Succeeded by Simon Harris
Party political offices
Preceded by Enda Kenny	Leader of Fine Gael; 2017–2024	Succeeded by Simon Harris

Dáil	Election	Deputy (Party)	Deputy (Party)	Deputy (Party)	Deputy (Party)	Deputy (Party)
22nd	1981	Jim Mitchell (FG)	Brian Lenihan Snr (FF)	Richard Burke (FG)	Eileen Lemass (FF)	Brian Fleming (FG)
23rd	1982 (Feb)	Jim Mitchell (FG)	Brian Lenihan Snr (FF)	Richard Burke (FG)	Liam Lawlor (FF)	Brian Fleming (FG)
23rd	1982 by-election	Jim Mitchell (FG)	Brian Lenihan Snr (FF)	Liam Skelly (FG)	Liam Lawlor (FF)	Brian Fleming (FG)
24th	1982 (Nov)	Jim Mitchell (FG)	Brian Lenihan Snr (FF)	Liam Skelly (FG)	Eileen Lemass (FF)	Tomás Mac Giolla (WP)
25th	1987	Jim Mitchell (FG)	Brian Lenihan Snr (FF)	Pat O'Malley (PDs)	Liam Lawlor (FF)	Tomás Mac Giolla (WP)
26th	1989	Jim Mitchell (FG)	Brian Lenihan Snr (FF)	Austin Currie (FG)	Liam Lawlor (FF)	Tomás Mac Giolla (WP)
27th	1992	Joan Burton (Lab)	Brian Lenihan Snr (FF)	Austin Currie (FG)	Liam Lawlor (FF)	4 seats 1992–2002
27th	1996 by-election	Joan Burton (Lab)	Brian Lenihan Jnr (FF)	Austin Currie (FG)	Liam Lawlor (FF)	4 seats 1992–2002
28th	1997	Joe Higgins (SP)	Brian Lenihan Jnr (FF)	Austin Currie (FG)	Liam Lawlor (FF)	4 seats 1992–2002
29th	2002	Joe Higgins (SP)	Brian Lenihan Jnr (FF)	Joan Burton (Lab)	3 seats 2002–2011	
30th	2007	Leo Varadkar (FG)	Brian Lenihan Jnr (FF)	Joan Burton (Lab)	3 seats 2002–2011	
31st	2011	Leo Varadkar (FG)	Brian Lenihan Jnr (FF)	Joan Burton (Lab)	Joe Higgins (SP)	4 seats 2011–2024
31st	2011 by-election	Leo Varadkar (FG)	Patrick Nulty (Lab)	Joan Burton (Lab)	Joe Higgins (SP)	4 seats 2011–2024
31st	2014 by-election	Leo Varadkar (FG)	Ruth Coppinger (SP)	Joan Burton (Lab)	Joe Higgins (SP)	4 seats 2011–2024
32nd	2016	Leo Varadkar (FG)	Ruth Coppinger (AAA–PBP)	Joan Burton (Lab)	Jack Chambers (FF)	4 seats 2011–2024
33rd	2020	Leo Varadkar (FG)	Paul Donnelly (SF)	Roderic O'Gorman (GP)	Jack Chambers (FF)	4 seats 2011–2024
34th	2024	Emer Currie (FG)	Paul Donnelly (SF)	Roderic O'Gorman (GP)	Jack Chambers (FF)	Ruth Coppinger (PBP–S)
