= 2024 Fine Gael leadership election =

Irish political party leadership election

- 24 March 2024
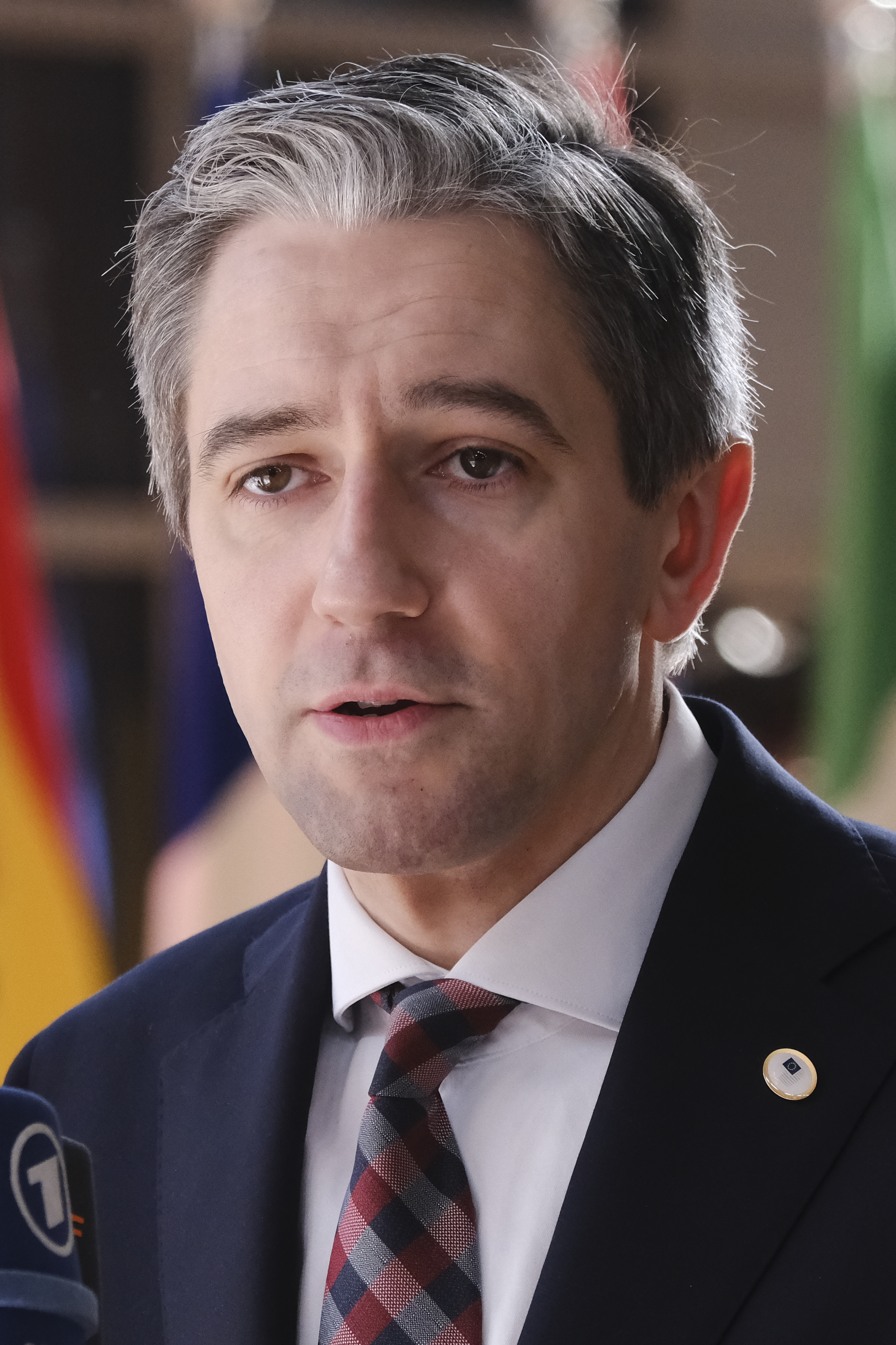
Candidate	Simon Harris
Popular vote	Unopposed
Leader before election
Leo Varadkar
Elected Leader
Simon Harris

The 2024 Fine Gael leadership election followed the resignation of Leo Varadkar as party leader on 20 March 2024. As the only candidate nominated, Simon Harris, the Minister for Further and Higher Education, Research, Innovation and Science, was deemed elected as party leader on 24 March 2024.

== Background ==
Leo Varadkar was elected leader of Fine Gael in on 2 June 2017 and was appointed as Taoiseach on 14 June 2017. At 38 years old he became the youngest person to hold the office, and Ireland's first openly gay head of government. He later served as Tánaiste from 2020 to 2022 before becoming Taoiseach again in December 2022.

On 8 March 2024, two referendums were held on proposed amendments to the Constitution of Ireland. Voters overwhelmingly rejected both proposed amendments, and several sources reported the referendum results as a defeat for Varadkar.

On 20 March 2024, Varadkar announced that he would resign as Fine Gael leader immediately, and as Taoiseach once a successor was elected. In his resignation speech, Varadkar stated that the reasons for his stepping down were "both personal and political" and that he was no longer the "best person for the job". Following subsequent speculation, he "denied having any ulterior motive or a new job lined up".

== Electoral process ==
Nominations for the position of party leader opened at 10 a.m. on Thursday 21 March 2024 and closed at 1 p.m. on Sunday 24 March 2024, having been "brought forward [...] by 24 hours" and with Simon Harris as the only candidate.

While, after Varadkar's resignation, there had been initial media speculation about other potential candidates, Harris was the only candidate to seek the nomination or receive endorsement. He was deemed elected as leader on the close of nominations on Sunday 24 March 2024.

Had there been other candidates, the party's constitution provided for voting based on an "electoral college" model, with voting by the Fine Gael parliamentary party (65% of votes), ordinary party members (25%) and Fine Gael local representatives (10%).

== Candidates ==
=== Confirmed ===
- Simon Harris, TD for Wicklow; Minister for Further and Higher Education, Research, Innovation and Science

=== Declined ===
- Simon Coveney, TD for Cork South-Central; Minister for Enterprise, Trade and Employment
- Paschal Donohoe, TD for Dublin Central; Minister for Public Expenditure, National Development Plan Delivery and Reform
- Heather Humphreys, TD for Cavan–Monaghan; Minister for Social Protection and Minister for Rural and Community Development
- Helen McEntee, TD for Meath East; Minister for Justice
