= AsIAm =

Irish autism charity

Coordinates: 53.30023°N 6.17638°W

- Type: Non-profit
- Industry: Autism education and support
- Founded: August 21, 2014; 12 years ago in Dublin, Ireland
- Founder: Adam Harris
- Headquarters: Blackrock, Dublin, Ireland
- Area served: Nationwide
- Owner: Adam Harris
- Number of employees: >60 (2025)
- Website: asiam.ie

AsIAm is an Irish autism charity — sometimes given the title of Ireland's National Autism Charity — founded by Adam Harris, brother of Simon Harris. Adam is himself autistic. The organisation was founded on 21 August 2014. AsIAm has an official policy of at least 50% of its board members being autistic.

== Support ==
AsIAm provides support such as a legal clinic and lists autism-friendly jobs with accredited employers.

== Activism ==
=== Education ===
In 2014 AsIAm published guides for autistic students in coping with challenges they face in school.

In 2019 AsIAm warned of a crisis where autistic children and those with special needs were being excluded from school. They found that half of parents of autistic children had been waiting more than a year for a suitable school place. Hundreds of children were being excluded from school entirely.

In May 2022 AsIAm and Inclusion Ireland called for emergency legislation to ensure the rights of children with special needs to education. Nearly 270 of these children were autistic.

=== Employment ===
In October 2023 Debbie Merrigan of AsIAm said that the unemployment rate of autistic people in Ireland was 85%. She also said "That is quite devastating, I get calls weekly from people who may have master’s degrees or PhDs, or those who are school leavers, but they all have the same story – ‘I can’t get a job; what’s wrong with me?’ And there's nothing wrong with them – it's the attitude of the employers."

AsIAm works with employers to make interview and training processes more autism-friendly.

=== Other advocacy ===
In September 2025 AsIAm criticised Danny Healy-Rae over his comments on autism during a Dáil debate when he said "I am wondering what it is, and I have asked this question here before in different debates. Is there something causing it? Is it lack of some vitamins or what is it? We need to address that part of it as well because there could be something that is causing it."

AsIAm criticised the remarks as unhelpful and misinformed. AsIAm said "We would ask all Oireachtas members to think about the impact of their words before they use their platform to add to the pervasive stigma, myths and hurtful stereotypes that not only cause hurt but create barriers to diagnosis and support and pose broader public health concerns." AsIAm also pointed out that autism is a natural variation in human nervous systems and that there are not more autistic people, but more people seeking diagnoses.

== See also ==
- List of autism organizations
