= Adam Harris (autistic advocate) =

Irish disability advocate

- Born: 27 November 1994 (age 31)
- Occupation: CEO of AsIAm
- Known for: Founding AsIAm; Autism advocacy
- Spouse: Daniel O'Driscoll (m. 2025)
- Relatives: Simon Harris (brother)

Adam Harris (born November 1994) is an Irish disability advocate and non-profit executive known for founding the autism advocacy organization AsIAm.

== Early life and education ==
Adam Harris was born to Mary, a Montessori preschool teacher and SNA, and Bart Harris, a taxi driver. His brother is Simon Harris, the former taoiseach of Ireland. He also has a sister named Gemma. He grew up in Greystones.

From an early age, Harris displayed autistic traits, such as being speech delayed and having poor coordination. His mother, who worked at Harris's preschool, recognised the traits as autism, and he was diagnosed as autistic at age five. After his diagnosis, he attended a special school in Ballyboden for three years. After returning to Greystones, he attended St. Patrick's National School Greystones, completing his schoolwork with the help of an SNA. He later attended St. David's Secondary School. In 2013, Harris began a social studies degree at University College Dublin, but he dropped out in December in order to focus on AsIAm.

== Career ==
=== AsIAm ===
Harris founded AsIAm, a charity focused on autism education, support and advocacy, on 21 August 2014, at the age of 19. The following November, he won the Social Entrepreneurs Ireland Elevator Award for his work, receiving €30,000 in funding. In 2016, Harris was involved in the pilot project to make Dublin City University an autism-friendly campus.

On 17 June 2026, Harris announced he would be stepping down from the role of CEO of AsIAm, in order to take up the position of CEO of Social Entrepreneurs Ireland.

=== Advocacy work ===
Harris is a disability advocate and serves on multiple boards and commissions. He has been a member of the Irish Human Rights and Equality Commission since 2020, a member of the board of Rethink Ireland since 2022, and a member of the Autism-Europe Council of Administration since 2019. In 2025, he was the chairman and ambassador of the 14th Autism Europe Congress.

== Television appearances ==
Harris's first television appearance was on the The Late Late Show. He was interviewed on The Saturday Night Show in 2015.

In 2014, Harris took part in filming for the RTÉ documentary Autism and Me. He made an appearance on The Late Late Show to promote the documentary's March 2017 release.

In 2020, Harris was one of six entrepreneurs featured in RTÉ One documentary Changing Ireland: My Big Idea.

== Personal life ==
Adam Harris is gay. He met his husband Daniel O'Driscoll in 2017, and they got engaged in 2023. They married in a private ceremony on Fota Island in 2025. He currently lives in Dublin city-centre.
