= Luke Beardon =

English academic

Luke Beardon is an English academic in the field of autism studies. As of July 2026, he is a Senior Lecturer with The Autism Centre at Sheffield Hallam University, following an earlier career with the National Autistic Society. He received a Doctor of Education degree from Sheffield Hallam University.

Beardon has written and published numerous books related to autism that utilize the neurodiversity paradigm, celebrate neurodiversity, and focus on "helping autistic people thrive in a neurotypical world".

== Books ==
- Edmonds, Genevieve; Beardon, Luke, eds. (2008). Asperger Syndrome and Employment: Adults Speak Out about Asperger Syndrome. Jessica Kingsley Publishers. ISBN 978-1-84642-770-1.
- Edmonds, Genevieve; Beardon, Luke (2008). Asperger Syndrome and Social Relationships: Adults Speak Out about Asperger Syndrome. Jessica Kingsley Publishers. ISBN 978-1-84642-777-0.
- Beardon, Luke; Worton, Dean (2011). Aspies on Mental Health: Speaking for Ourselves. Jessica Kingsley Publishers. ISBN 978-1-84905-152-1.
- Wylie, Philip; Lawson, Wenn; Beardon, Luke, eds. (2015). The Nine Degrees of Autism: A Developmental Model for the Alignment and Reconciliation of Hidden Neurological Conditions. London: Routledge. doi:10.4324/9781315714332. ISBN 978-1-315-71433-2.
- Beardon, Luke; Worton, Dean (2017). Bittersweet on the Autism Spectrum. Jessica Kingsley Publishers. ISBN 978-1-78450-485-4.
- Beardon, Luke; Worton, Dean (2017). Love, Partnership, or Singleton on the Autism Spectrum. Jessica Kingsley Publishers. ISBN 978-1-78450-484-7.
- Beardon, Luke. Autism and Asperger syndrome in adults. London, Sheldon Press. (2017).
- Beardon, Luke (2019). Autism and Asperger Syndrome in Childhood: For parents and carers of the newly diagnosed. John Murray Press. ISBN 978-1-84709-493-3.
- Beardon, Luke (2020). Avoiding Anxiety in Autistic Children: A Guide for Autistic Wellbeing. John Murray Press. ISBN 978-1-5293-9477-1.
- Beardon, Luke (2021). Autism in Adults. Sheldon Press. ISBN 978-1-5293-7541-1.
- Beardon, Luke (2021). Avoiding Anxiety in Autistic Adults: A Guide for Autistic Wellbeing. John Murray Press. ISBN 978-1-5293-9475-7.
- Beardon, Luke (2022). What Works for Autistic Children. John Murray Press. ISBN 978-1-3998-0169-0.
