= Ali Hewson =

Irish activist and businesswoman

Alison Hewson
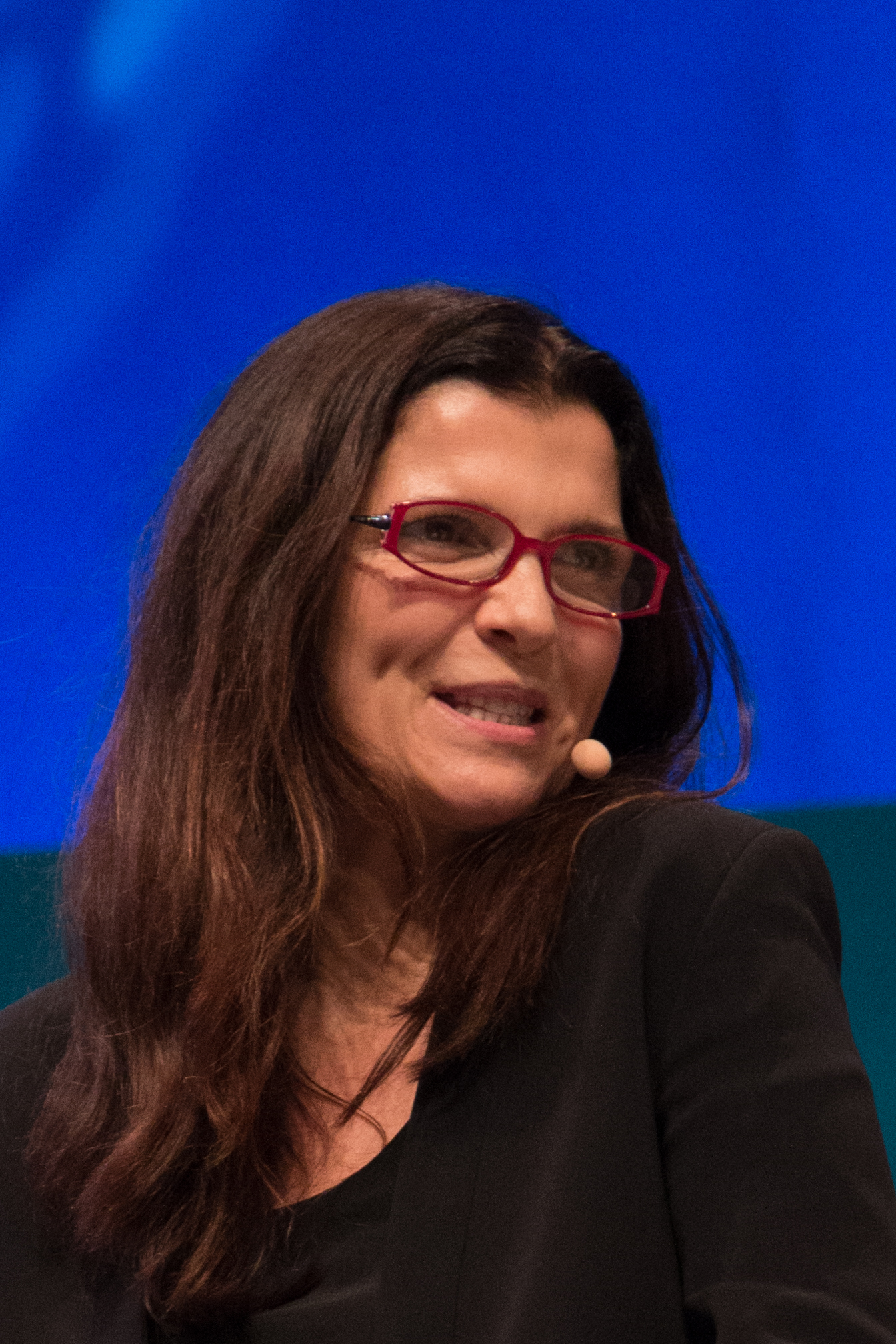
- Hewson in 2014
- Born: Alison Stewart; 23 March 1961 (age 65)
- Education: University College Dublin
- Occupations: Activist; businesswoman
- Spouse: Bono (m. 1982)
- Children: 4, including Eve and Elijah

Alison Hewson (née Stewart; born 23 March 1961) is an Irish activist and businesswoman. She is married to singer and musician Paul Hewson, known as Bono, from the rock band U2.

Raised in Raheny, she met her future husband at age 12 at Mount Temple Comprehensive School, and married him in 1982. She was awarded a degree in politics and sociology from University College Dublin (UCD) in 1989. The couple have four children together and live at residences in Ireland, France, and the United States. She has inspired several U2 songs, most famously "Sweetest Thing".

Hewson became involved in anti-nuclear activism in the 1990s. She narrated Black Wind, White Land, a 1993 Irish documentary about the lasting effects of the Chernobyl disaster, and has worked closely with activist Adi Roche. She has been a patron of Chernobyl Children's Project International since 1994 and has participated in a number of aid missions to the high-radiation exclusion zones of Belarus. She has also campaigned against Sellafield, the northern English nuclear facility. In 2002 she helped lead an effort which sent more than a million postcards, urging the site be closed, to Prime Minister Tony Blair and others. Hewson has repeatedly been discussed by tabloid newspapers as a possible candidate for political offices, including President of Ireland; none of these suggestions have come to fruition.

Hewson is the co-founder of two ethical businesses, the EDUN fashion line in 2005, and Nude Skincare products in 2007. The former, intended to promote fair trade with Africa, has struggled to become a viable business. French conglomerate LVMH has made substantial investments into both companies.

== Early life ==
Alison Stewart was born on 23 March 1961, the daughter of Terry and Joy Stewart. She has an older brother, Ian, and nephew, Ross Stewart, who both live in Australia. The Stewart family, who resided in the suburb of Raheny on Dublin's Northside, raised their children as Protestants. Her father was a self-educated electrical worker who, according to Hewson, was "constantly questioning" things. Her mother, who was a housewife, had a secretarial career in mind for her daughter.

Stewart studied at Mount Temple Comprehensive School. At the age of twelve, she met Paul Hewson, who was in the year above at the school. He pursued her immediately, but she initially kept her distance, labeling him "an eejit" even though she secretly admired him. In September 1974, Paul's mother Iris died suddenly, leaving him emotionally adrift and in conflict with his father and brother. Soon after, Alison began taking care of Hewson: cleaning his clothes, walking to school with him, and cooking for him. In September 1976, Hewson met the other members of what would become U2; the band members adopted nicknames, and Hewson soon became known as Bono. At around the same time, he and Ali, as she was known, began dating, and soon became a steady couple. It took Stewart a while to enjoy the band's music, as her own tastes ran toward her father's Frank Sinatra and Nat King Cole records.

At one point, the pair split up, but soon reunited. The relationship became more serious as she accompanied him in his efforts to break through in the music industry, and by 1979 they were discussing marriage, conditional upon his career becoming established. In the meantime she worked in a motor insurance company and in her father's electrical business.

== Marriage and family ==
"She will not be worn like a brooch. We have a stormy relationship because she is her own woman."

— Bono describing their marriage, 1987

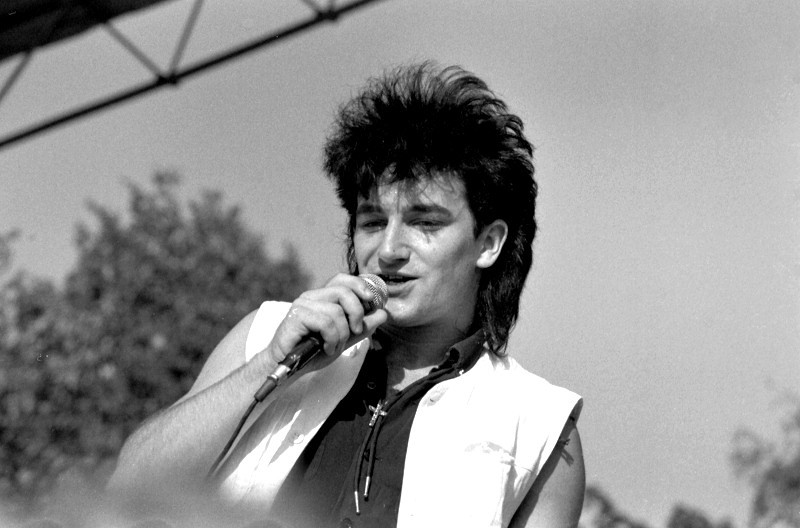
Bono in 1983, a year after he married Alison Hewson

Hewson married Bono on 31 August 1982 in a Church of Ireland ceremony at All Saints Church, Raheny. The ceremony combined rituals of both conventional Protestantism and the Shalom Friendship Christian group that Bono and other U2 members had belonged to. In debt to U2's record label, Island Records, the couple could not afford a honeymoon, but Island founder Chris Blackwell gave them use of the Goldeneye estate he owned in Jamaica. Having returned to Ireland, the couple moved to a small mews house in Howth, which they shared with the rest of U2.

"Our marriage has worked because we like each other, because we talk to each other, and we are passionate about what we do. We allow each other to pursue our goals. I wouldn't want to be married to someone who wasn't happy with what they were doing in life, and B wouldn't either. I have learned a lot about what it means to be married, how great it can be if you persevere. We're very close. He says I'm very good with the dog whistle."

— Hewson describing her marriage, 2005

As the band broke through in popularity with the War Tour in 1983, Ali Hewson did not readily adapt to the new circumstances. After seeing her with the group at a trendy Hollywood nightspot, journalist Ethlie Ann Vare commented that Ali looked "as out of place as a dairymaid in a brothel." Although she had wanted to become a nurse, Hewson gave up on the notion, as the intense schooling required would have been incompatible with the direction that her husband's life had taken. Instead she focused on studying in the social sciences, to give her an ability to understand social policy and make a difference to people, similar to what nursing would have enabled. By Bono's own description, the marriage hit a period of strain in 1986 due to time commitments during the group's recording of The Joshua Tree. Tensions continued in 1987 during the subsequent Joshua Tree Tour.

Hewson received a degree in social science, politics and sociology from University College Dublin in 1989 at age 28, giving birth to the couple's first daughter, Jordan, two weeks before her final exams. Further plans to earn a master's degree in moral and political ethics were put on hold after the birth of their second daughter, Memphis Eve, in 1991. Two sons, Elijah Bob Patricus Guggi Q and John Abraham, were born in 1999 and 2001, respectively. Being effectively a single parent while U2 toured was difficult for Hewson, but she now found Bono helpful even at a distance.

== Activism ==
In late 1985, following U2's participation in Live Aid, Bono and Hewson spent five weeks as aid volunteers in Ajibar during the 1983–1985 famine in Ethiopia. She saw children with no possessions and at risk of death; despite this, to her they appeared more spiritually alive than those in Ireland who had material comforts but seemed spoiled and spiritually unaware, like her own children. In 1986, the couple traveled to strife-torn areas in Nicaragua and El Salvador on a visit organised by Central American Mission Partners.

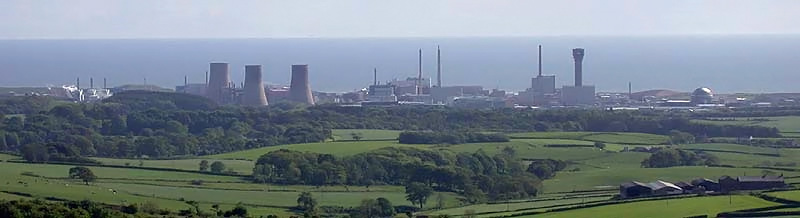
View west of Sellafield, with the Irish Sea in the background

In 1992, Hewson participated in Greenpeace protests against the Sellafield plant for nuclear reprocessing, located across the Irish Sea in Cumbria, England. She was especially set against the under-construction Thermal Oxide Reprocessing Plant component being opened. She was aboard Greenpeace's MV Solo when it staged a publicity-oriented "raid" wherein the band members landed on the beach at the plant in rubber dinghies, but she said she had not been responsible for that particular protest.

This involvement led her to become interested in the Chernobyl nuclear disaster of 1986. After a request by activist Adi Roche, she went to blighted, high-radiation exclusion zones in Belarus for three weeks to narrate part of Black Wind, White Land. The 1993 Irish documentary, shown on RTÉ, highlighted the plight of fallout victims of the Chernobyl event. Hot Press magazine wrote that Hewson had "obvious gifts as a presenter, which include a sense of quiet compassion that draws forth the best from the people she talks with." Another reviewer said that the documentary was very effective until she started speaking.

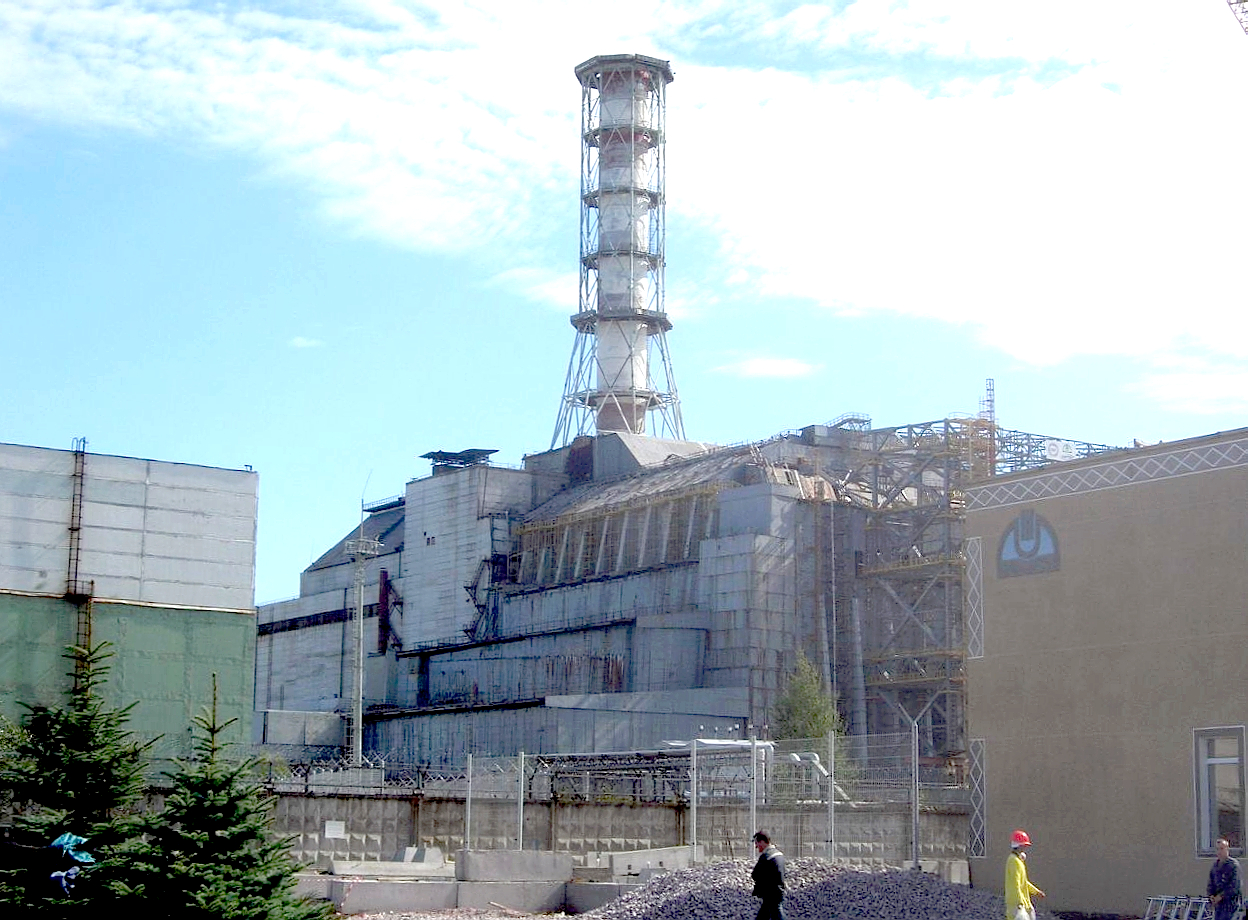
Chernobyl power plant in 2003 with the sarcophagus containment structure

Since 1994, Hewson has been a patron of Chernobyl Children's Project International (shortened to Chernobyl Children International in 2010), an organisation founded and run by Roche that works with children, families, and communities that continue to be affected by Chernobyl. Through the years, Hewson has taken at least ten trips to Belarus. She has organised overland aid convoys and sometimes driven ambulances filled with medical supplies herself; in one case she had to retreat quickly when a fire spread in a village a few miles from Chernobyl. Hewson has made sure her own children met those from Chernobyl with birth deformities and other illnesses, so that they would have a broader appreciation of the world and what to be thankful for. She has said that fundraising for those affected is very difficult, given that many people believe the problems of Chernobyl are all in the past.

"I don't have a skill. My biggest regret in life is that I never became a nurse because I'd be able to go out to all these countries and really help hands-on and really get stuck in."

— Ali Hewson reflecting upon paths not taken, 2005

She was aware from the outset that her circumstances would make her vulnerable to "ladies who lunch"-style remarks (sometimes made against women, married to wealthy, high-profile men, who engage in charitable activities), but said, "People who criticise these women are probably giving in to cynicism, and I think if you get cynical about life, you lose the real meaning of it." In 2007, she became a member of the board of directors for Chernobyl Children's Project International, a role that would give her a voice in the organisation's policy making. In 2009, she staged a public abseil of the 17-storey Elysian Tower in Cork to raise funds for the organisation.

She returned to the Sellafield issue in 2002, noting that while Ireland had no nuclear power plants itself, Belarus had been the most affected region even though Chernobyl was not in it, and that was "exactly what could happen in Ireland if there was an explosion at Sellafield." In addition, she feared the ongoing low-level emissions from Sellafield: "I started to wonder how safe it was for [children] to play on the beach or to swim in the sea or even to eat fish." In the aftermath of the 11 September 2001 attacks, she also viewed the plant as vulnerable to terrorists.

In April 2002, Hewson was one of the leaders of an effort which delivered over a million postcards demanding that the facility be shut down; recipients included British Prime Minister Tony Blair, Prince Charles, and Norman Askew, head of British Nuclear Fuels Limited. (The message to the first said, "Tony, look me in the eye and tell me I'm safe.") She personally delivered a giant postcard to Blair at 10 Downing Street. The Shut Sellafield Campaign had its postcards stocked in Superquinn and Dunnes Stores supermarkets, and Hewson publicly engaged Tesco when they refused to do the same. The campaign was backed by celebrities, including Ronan Keating and Samantha Mumba, and Hewson made many newspaper and radio appearances on its behalf. It was the first prolonged exposure Hewson had to the public eye, after two decades of mostly being focused upon maintaining her privacy. Her continued activism also meant that she too would not always be around for the couple's children.

As the postcard effort was reaching its peak, tabloid newspapers speculated that the Labour Party wanted to put Hewson up for the Irish presidential election of 2004, with the Daily Mirror quoting an unnamed party insider as saying, "She's a mother of four but she has always had world issues at heart and she'd make the perfect candidate." (Labour had succeeded with its candidate Mary Robinson in the 1990 election but came in fourth with Roche in the 1997 election.) Hewson stated that she had not been approached, and that "It's not a serious proposition. It would obviously be a huge honour if I was asked to take on such a huge task, but for one thing I'm not sure I'm qualified, and for another I've got four small kids to bring up first." She also expressed contentment with incumbent President Mary McAleese staying for another term. She jokingly added that she could not see Bono agreeing to live in a smaller house. Hewson received a media mention two years later as a possible Social Democratic and Labour Party candidate in the 2004 European Parliament elections after John Hume had stood down. The notion of her running for Irish president came up again in 2008 in conjunction with the 2011 election. Hewson demurred once more, saying she did not speak the Irish language well enough, this time adding humorously that she could not see her husband being willing to walk behind her at events. The candidate that Labour did put up, Michael D. Higgins, won the post. Notwithstanding this speculation, Hewson generally shies away from political comments in the media.

Hewson has long advocated for a children's museum for Ireland, inspired by a positive experience her daughters had at the Dallas Children's Museum in the mid-1990s. In 2003, plans were announced to build the so-called Exploration Station as part of the proposed Heuston Gate development near the Dublin Heuston railway station. The children-oriented science centre was to be owned by the Irish Children's Museum charitable trust, established in 2006, with Hewson as a member of the board led by Danny O'Hare. Hewson said, "Seeing as we're nearly the last European country in on it, we can learn from children's museums already up and running and expand on them". However, over the next few years the science centre faced significant cost overruns in the planning stages and a possible European Commission investigation into how the Office of Public Works had handled the awarding of the contract for it. The effects of the 2008 financial crisis then put a halt to the entire Heuston Gate project. As of August 2016, the site was finally fixed as between Earlsfort Terrace and the Iveagh Gardens, and as of October 2019, the post of CEO was advertised.

In 2015 Hewson signed an open letter which the ONE Campaign had been collecting signatures for; the letter was addressed to Angela Merkel and Nkosazana Dlamini-Zuma, urging them to focus on women as they serve as the head of the G7 in Germany and the AU in South Africa respectively, which will start to set the priorities in development funding before a main UN summit in September 2015 that will establish new development goals for the generation.

== Business career ==
In 2005, Hewson, Bono and designer Rogan Gregory co-founded the EDUN fashion label. (Note: The name is "nude" spelled backwards, to suggest both "natural" and the Garden of Eden.) It was intended to help bring about positive change in Africa through a fair trade-based relationship rather than by direct aid. Another aim of the label was to set an ethical example in an industry they felt had long exploited child labour. She said they wanted "to show that you can make a for-profit business where everybody in the chain is treated well." Hewson had not been particularly interested in fashion prior to this undertaking.

Hewson emphasised that Edun would have to be profitable to be considered a success, but in this it struggled. She later admitted that the couple were naive about what it takes to make a successful fashion enterprise. Edun encountered problems with both quality of goods and delivery times from their African suppliers, and most of the stores originally carrying the line dropped it. It lost €9.7 million in 2007 and €12.8 million in 2008, suffering along with the rest of the apparel sector from the 2008 financial crisis.

After the couple had put $20 million of their own funds into the venture, they sold 49% of it to French conglomerate LVMH in 2009. The relaunched Edun featured Sharon Wauchob as its new chief designer. By 2010, the company had outsourced much of the manufacturing for its new fashion line to China, generating some negative reactions, while simpler garments were still African-made. Hewson said that business realities compelled this action, but that she hoped more work could be done in Africa in the future. Hewson devoted a large amount of time to Edun, saying in 2011, "I think [the fashion industry] is the toughest business there is," and that despite the obstacles and struggles, "you just keep going." The proposition remained difficult, however, and Edun lost €6.8 million in 2011 and €5.9 million in 2012. The Hewsons said the company was in an investment phase and they were satisfied with the five-year strategic business plan underway.

Hewson is also co-founder, along with Bryan Meehan, of Nude skincare – a luxury, natural skincare company. Established in 2007, the venture sought to combine ethical principles and environmentally friendly, yet chic, packaging, with a high-performance product based on probiotics and omega oils.

In 2009, Hewson brought legal action in England against Stella McCartney for bringing out Stella Nude, a new eau de toilette version of the Stella perfume, saying that it amounted to copyright infringement of her own Nude Skincare. Hewson lost in the High Court when Mr Justice Floyd ruled against her.

In February 2011, LVMH purchased 70 percent of Nude skincare. The following year, Hewson said that being part of a much larger corporation gave them research and development resources that they previously lacked and a more focused approach to marketing. She added, "It took us much longer to get here than we anticipated. But we still have very big ambitions for the brand to go much farther."

== Hewson and U2 ==
"I would wake up in bed in the foetal position, and Ali would say: 'What's wrong?' I'd tell her, 'I don't want to get out of bed.' And she'd say, 'You don't want to write is what you mean.' ... Ali was literally kicking me out of bed in the morning, putting the pen in my hand."

— Bono in 2005 on his writer's block period in 1983

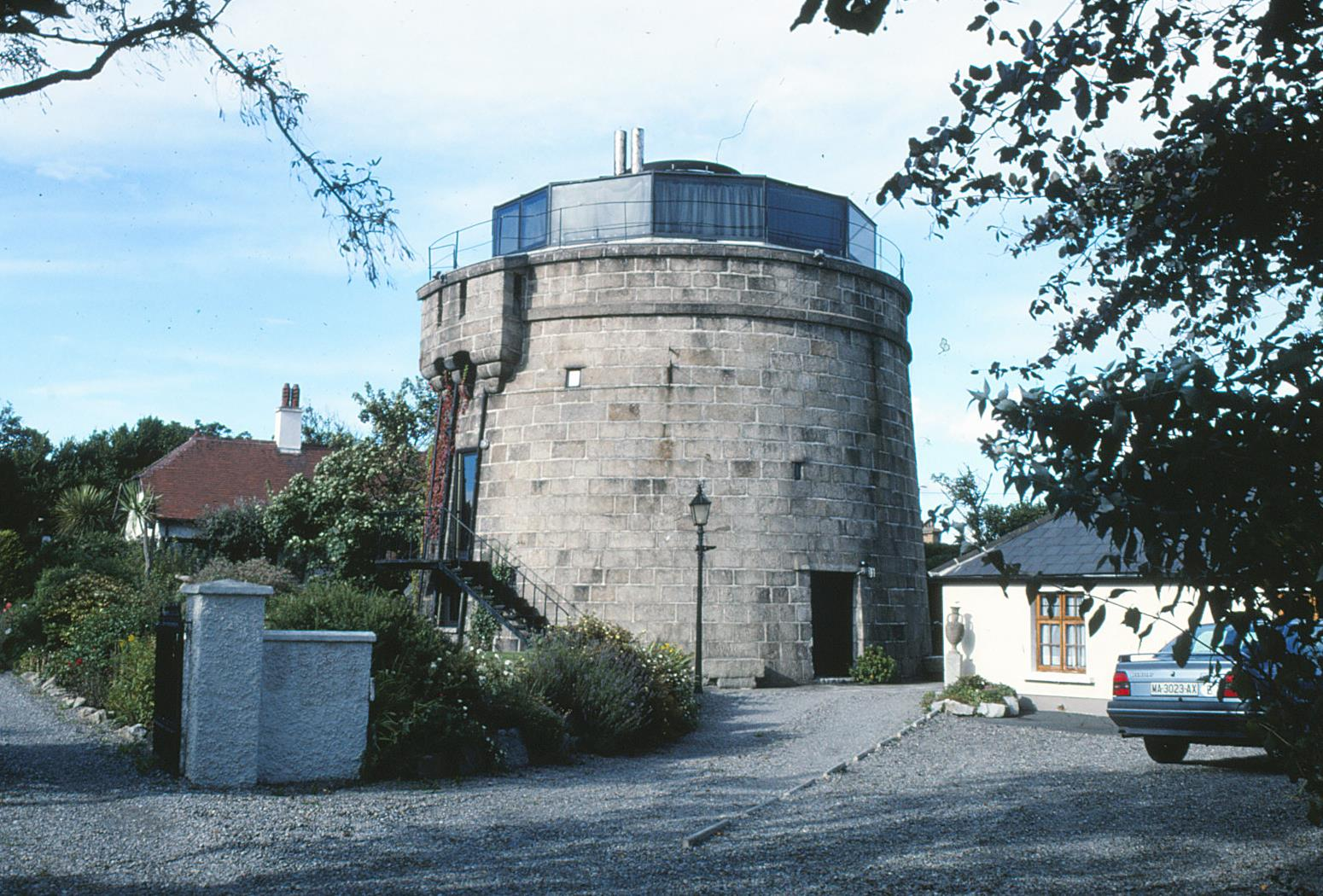
The Martello Tower in Bray, adapted as a private residence, where Bono and Ali lived during the 1980s

Hewson has served as at least partial inspiration for many Bono-authored U2 songs, going back to the track "Another Time, Another Place" from their 1980 debut album Boy. She helped Bono get through a bad period of writer's block during the lead-up to the 1983 War album, particularly in the composition of the lyrics to "Sunday Bloody Sunday". She inspired the personal themes in "New Year's Day", from the same record. That album and the accompanying War Tour brought financial success to the band, and Bono and Hewson moved into a three-level, three-room Martello tower in Bray. The group's 1984 song "Promenade" reflects both that location and the spiritual aspects of his desire for her.

The U2 song "Sweetest Thing" was written for Hewson as a gift because Bono forgot her birthday whilst recording with the band during The Joshua Tree sessions. Originally released as a B-side in 1987, it was later re-recorded and released as a single from the compilation album The Best of 1980–1990 in 1998. Hewson agreed to appear in the single's music video as long as all proceeds from it went to Chernobyl Children's Project.

Bono wrote the lyric of the 1988 song "All I Want Is You" as a meditation on the idea of commitment. He later said, "[It]'s clearly about a younger version of myself and my relationship with Ali," and added that by nature he was a wanderer, not a family man, and that "The only reason I'm here is because I met someone so extraordinary that I just couldn't let that go." U2 lyrics usually have several possible levels of interpretation, and it is not always possible to definitively ascribe Hewson's influence upon them, but music writer Niall Stokes believes that inspiration from Hewson is pronounced throughout the group's 1997 album Pop, particularly on "Staring at the Sun", which he believes reflects her Chernobyl Children's Project involvement and the feelings of both danger and hopefulness that it triggered in Bono. Stokes also believes that the 2000 song "When I Look at the World" is an explicit acknowledgement of Hewson's strength and commitment as exemplified by that Chernobyl work, while others think it is about Jesus or God. Bono has seemed to deflect those interpretations, saying that song is in part a hard-edged look at himself from the eyes of one losing faith. In any case, Bono has said that he does not feel constrained in his writing or interviews by what Hewson might think, as "[she] doesn't read newspapers. Or listen to the radio. There's a mysterious distance between us."

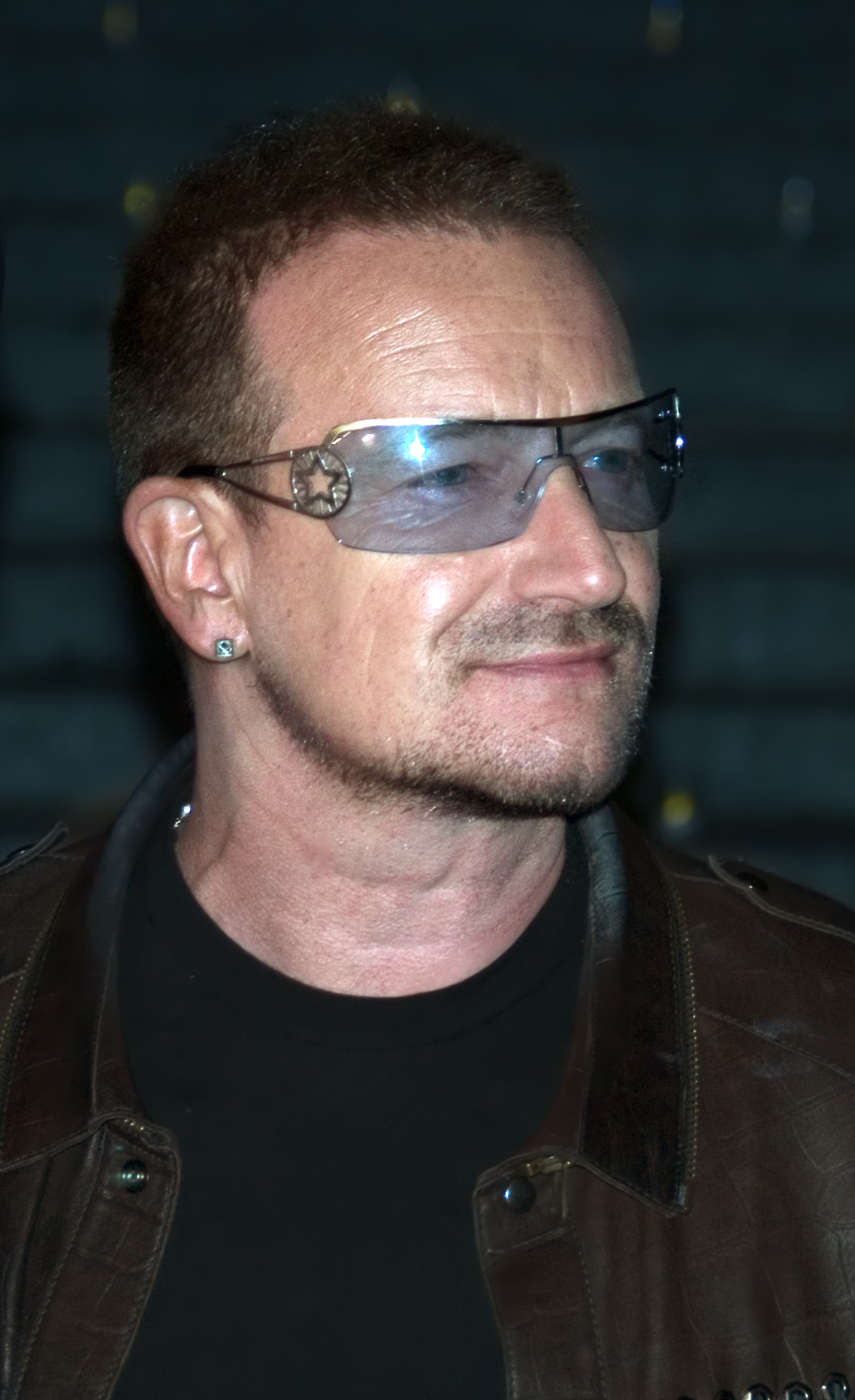
Hewson has been the main subject of several songs written by Bono (pictured).

Hewson and her family live in Killiney, in south County Dublin, in a mansion and grounds that overlook the Irish Sea and that have been expanded by purchasing the adjoining property. Bill Clinton and Salman Rushdie are among those who have stayed at the guest house there. With U2 bandmate The Edge, the couple co-own a 20-room villa in Èze in the Alpes-Maritimes in the south of France, where Bono and Hewson often mix with top celebrities. Hewson in particular has been friendly with several supermodels, which she uses to her advantage when booking charity events. (Note: In one case she brought on Helena Christensen as an ambassador for Chernobyl Children's Project, and she is also a member of the board of directors of Christensen's SEIMEI Fund.) Bono and Hewson also own a $14.5 million penthouse apartment at The San Remo on the Upper West Side of Manhattan, which they purchased from Steve Jobs. By 2011, the couple's fortune was placed at €572 million.

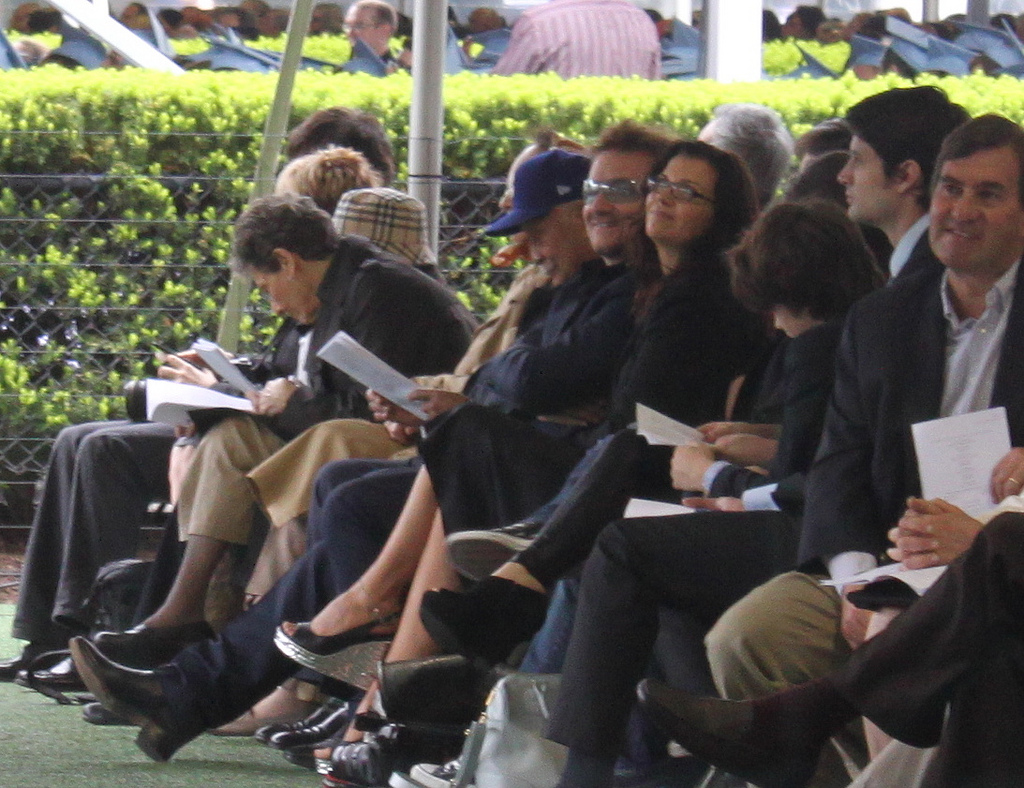
Bono and Ali Hewson at their daughter's graduation in 2012

While her husband has provoked a variety of critical responses—some negative—assessments of Hewson have generally been favourable, characterising her as down-to-earth. She views herself as "not a typical rock star wife". Their marriage has been considered one of the most long-lived and stable in the entertainment world. She does have to deal with the psychological effects of her husband coming off tour and readjusting to domestic life. After the extended 1992–1993 Zoo TV Tour, full of sensory overloads and alternate stage personae for Bono, the couple began a practice of hosting Sunday lunches at home, to establish a sense of regular, ordinary activities. The family became fixtures at Sunday services in Killiney as well, with a bond of Christianity still existing between the couple. She has stated, "I've no desire to be a star," seeing the effect intense public attention has had on both her husband and on activist Adi Roche. While she dislikes being referred to as "Bono's wife", she has said, " [...] I really don't have a big problem with my own identity, because I am a very private person, so I've always let Bono take the brunt of anything that was coming along. He is happy to do that; I am quite happy to make my own way around things."

== Awards and honours ==
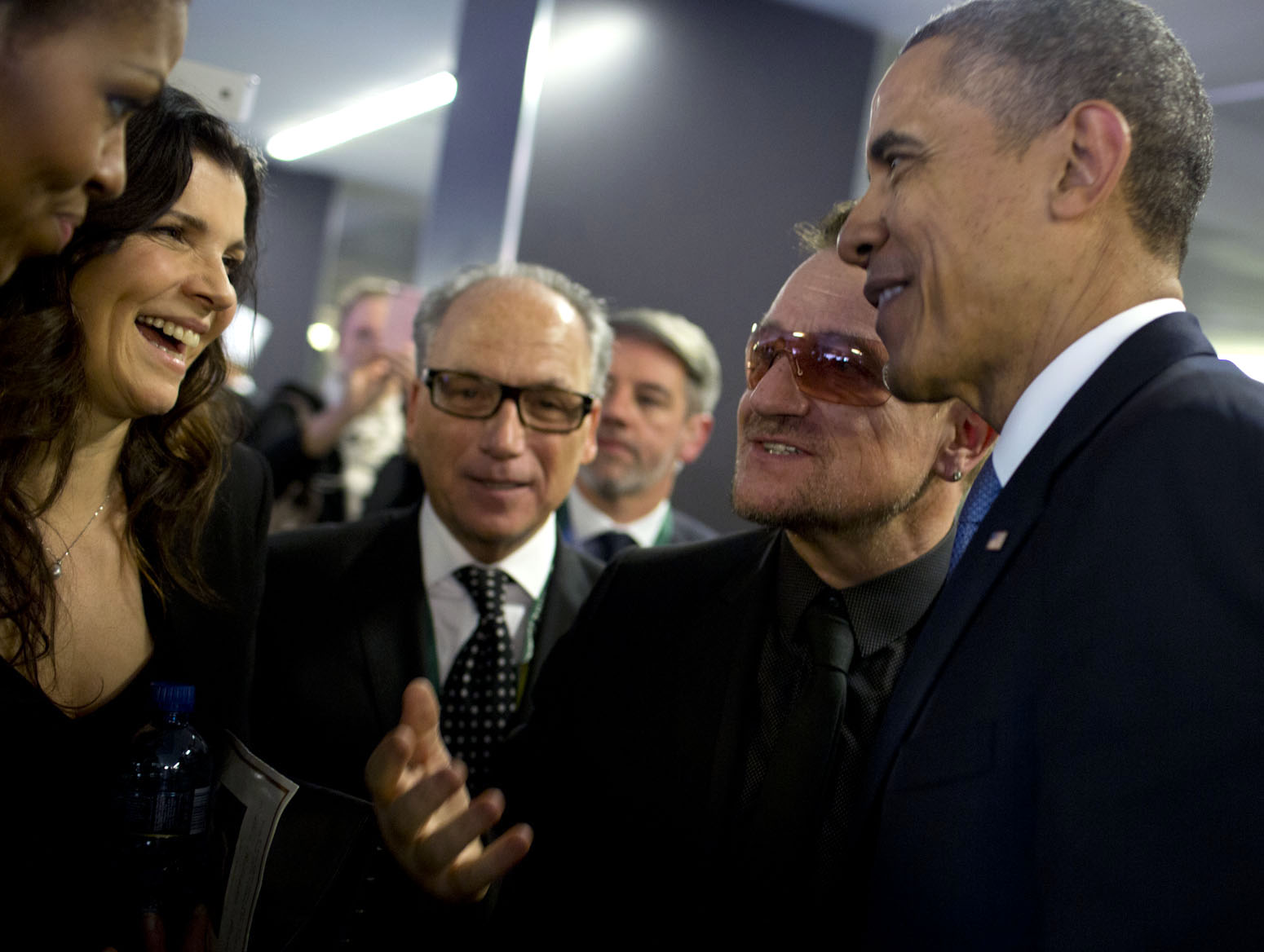
Hewson (second from left) with Barack and Michelle Obama and Bono, before a 2013 memorial service for Nelson Mandela

"Thank you, I'm flattered. This will keep me smiling on those 'not so sexy' days!"

— Ali Hewson, in response to having been voted Sexiest Celebrity Other Half.

The Cranberries' 2001 song "Time Is Ticking Out" was inspired by Hewson's work with Chernobyl Children's Project. In 2002, Hewson received an honorary Doctor of Laws degree from the National University of Ireland for her work on environmental issues, particularly the Chernobyl Children's Project. Bono and Ali Hewson were given the Council of Fashion Designers of America board of directors' Special Tribute Award in 2007 for their humanitarian work via the Edun clothing line. Hewson was also voted Sexiest Celebrity Other Half in a 2008 poll by entertainment.ie.

== Bibliography ==
- Dunphy, Eamon (1987). Unforgettable Fire: The Story of U2. New York: Warner Books. ISBN 0-446-51459-4.
- Flanagan, Bill (1995). U2: At the End of the World. New York: Delacorte Press. ISBN 0-385-31154-0.
- Jobling, John (2014). U2: The Definitive Biography. New York: Thomas Dunne Books. ISBN 1-250-02789-6.
- Kootnikoff, David (2012). Bono: A Biography. Santa Barbara, California: ABC-CLIO. ISBN 0-313-35509-6.
- Stokes, Niall (third edition, 2005). Into the Heart: The Stories Behind Every U2 Song. New York: Thunder's Mouth Press. ISBN 1-56025-765-2.
- U2; McCormick, Neil (ed) (2006). U2 by U2. London: HarperCollins. ISBN 1-56025-765-2.
