= Black Wind, White Land =

- Theatrical release poster
- Black Wind, White Land
- Directed by: Gene Kerrigan
- Written by: Gene Kerrigan
- Produced by: Ali Hewson; Adi Roche
- Narrated by: Ali Hewson
- Cinematography: Donal Gilligan
- Edited by: Isobel Stephenson
- Music by: Ronan Hardiman
- Distributed by: Dreamchaser Productions
- Release date: 1993
- Running time: 53 minutes
- Country: Ireland
- Language: English

Black Wind, White Land: Living With Chernobyl (stylised in all lowercase) is a 1993 documentary film, researched and produced by the founders of the Chernobyl Children International and explores the 1986 Chernobyl disaster and its consequences for the development of people in Belarus, Russia and Ukraine. The film was directed by Gene Kerrigan and produced by Ali Hewson, the wife of U2's singer Bono.

== Background ==
Chernobyl Children's Project International was founded in Ireland in 1991 by Adi Roche in response to an appeal from Ukrainian and Belarusian doctors for aid. As a result of the organization's work, two documentaries have been released: Black Wind, White Land and Chernobyl Heart. Black Wind, White Land highlights the plight of fallout victims of the Chernobyl event.

Ali Hewson's involvement with Greenpeace protests against the Sellafield plant for nuclear reprocessing led her to become interested in the Chernobyl nuclear disaster of 1986. After a request by Adi Roche, she went to blighted, high-radiation exclusion zones in Belarus for three weeks to narrate part of the documentary.

== Reception and critical responses ==
"When in watching the film, it's clear that Hewson is the perfect narrator. Her compassion and knowledge of the disaster and its aftermath is a true force and a voice all her own."

—Lisa Waugh from Rock World Magazine, 2011

Black Wind, White Land, was shown on RTÉ. Hot Press wrote that Hewson had "obvious gifts as a presenter, which include a sense of quiet compassion that draws forth the best from the people she talks with". Another reviewer said that the documentary was very effective until she started speaking. Hewson disagreed with accusations that she was used on the project because of her husband's fame.

== See also ==
- List of Chernobyl-related charities
