= Ladies who lunch (disambiguation) =

Ladies who lunch is a phrase referring to a type of well-off, well-dressed women.

Ladies who lunch may also refer to:

- "The Ladies Who Lunch" (song), a song from the Broadway musical Company
- "The Ladies Who Lunch" (Desperate Housewives), an episode of Desperate Housewives
- "Ladies Who Lunch", a sketch on the Season 36 premiere of Saturday Night Live
- Ladies Who Lunch, a short-lived alternative pop/lo-fi band featuring Kate Schellenbach and Josephine Wiggs.
