= Sharon Wauchob =

Irish designer

- Label: Sharon Wauchob

Sharon Wauchob is a designer who studied at the Central Saint Martins College of Arts and Design in London. Shortly after graduating, Wauchob moved to Paris, where she worked for Koji Tatsuno. Later, she worked as an in-house designer at Louis Vuitton LVMH.

In 1998, Wauchob decided to launch a fashion label under her own name, specialising in “alternative” styles. She shows her collections during the London Fashion Week.

In May 2009 EDUN, the global fashion brand of Ali Hewson and her husband, U2 singer Bono, appointed Wauchob as the new creative director.
