= Bryan Meehan =

Irish businessman

Meehan in 2023

Bryan Meehan is an Irish businessman and formally the executive chair of Blue Bottle Coffee Company. He also created the "Fresh and Wild"organic markets in London, and then founded the all-natural skincare beauty line "Nude" with Bono and Ali Hewson. Meehan is now focused on climate related projects including Dromgarriff Rainforest in Glengarriff, Ireland and since 2018 has served on The Global Sustainability Board at Nestle. His investments and philanthropy are heavily focused on projects that are meant to help combat climate change.

== Blue Bottle Coffee Company ==
Meehan led a major investment of Blue Bottle Coffee in 2012. Blue Bottle Coffee Company is a US coffee roaster and retailer headquartered in Oakland, California and considered a major player in third wave coffee. The company was founded by James Freeman in 2002. Blue Bottle currently has stores in the San Francisco Bay Area, LA, New York, Cambridge, Boston, Miami, & Japan. In 2015, the company raised $73,000,000 in a round led by Fidelity Investments. Other investors include Jared Leto, Tony Hawk, Chris Sacca & Bono.

== Fresh & Wild ==
Meehan developed the idea of bringing organic stores to the UK after seeing the Whole Foods Organic Supermarket concept while living in Boston and studying at Harvard Business School and Trinity College in Dublin. Meehan came back to London in 1998 and set up organic Fresh & Wild stores with Hass Hassan (founder of Alfalfas/Wild Oats in US).

Meehan and Hass built the Fresh & Wild chain to seven stores, the largest chain of natural and organic food supermarkets in the UK. Widely popular with high-income earning Londoners, the stores amassed over 40,000 shoppers a week. In 2004, they sold the business to US-based Whole Foods Market.

== Nude Skincare ==
Meehan launched 'Nude Skincare' in 2007. Using his experience with organic food, Meehan spent two years learning about skincare in order to build a comprehensive understanding of ingredients and clinical testing.

His friend Ali Hewson is the inspiration, investor and 'muse' of the brand and supermodels Christy Turlington and Helena Christensen are also supporters.
