= 1997 Irish presidential election =

- 30 October 1997
- Turnout: 47.6% (▼16.5 pp)
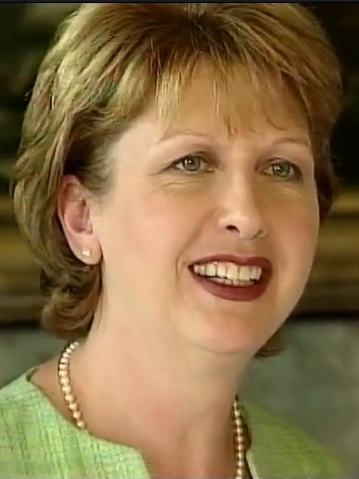

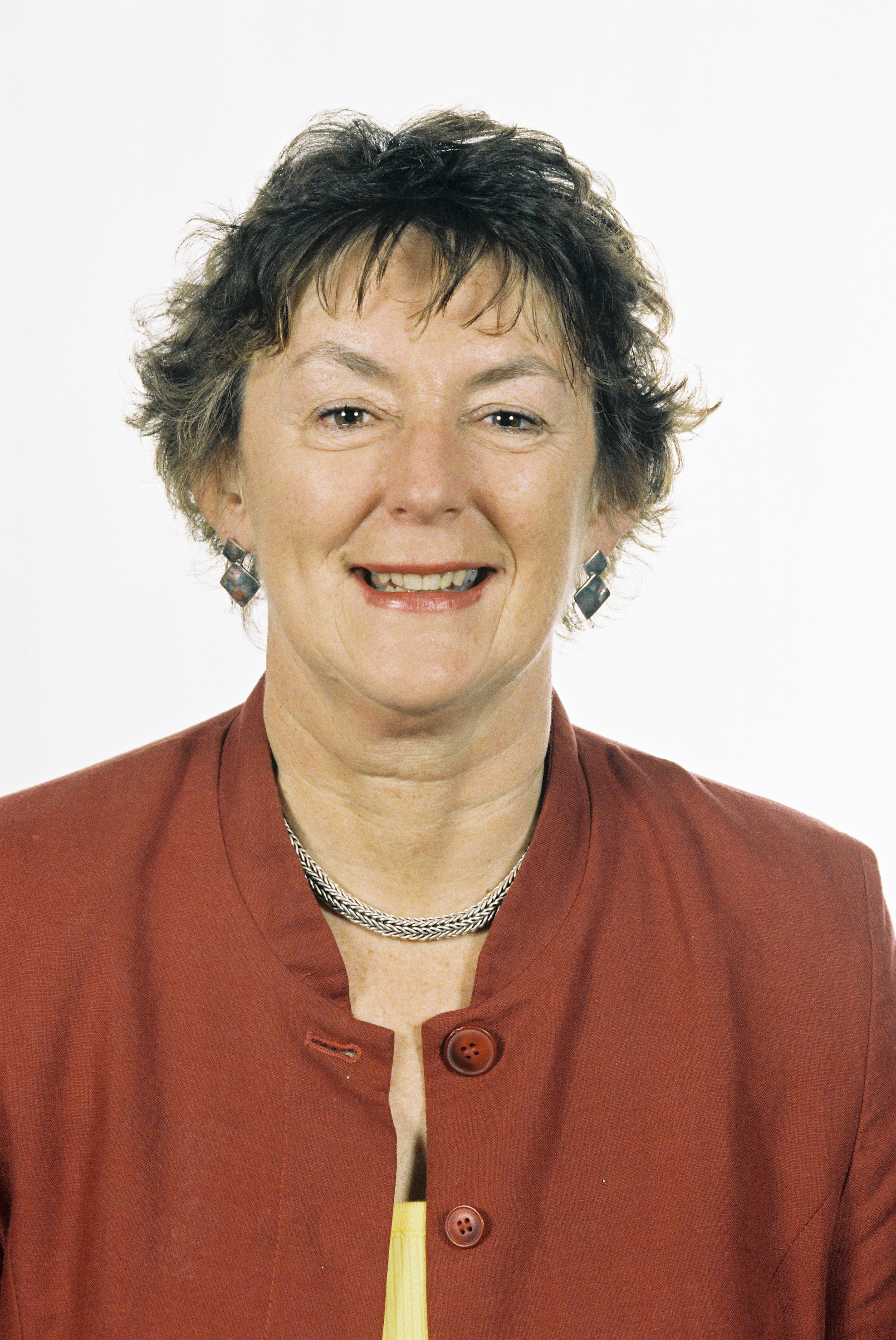

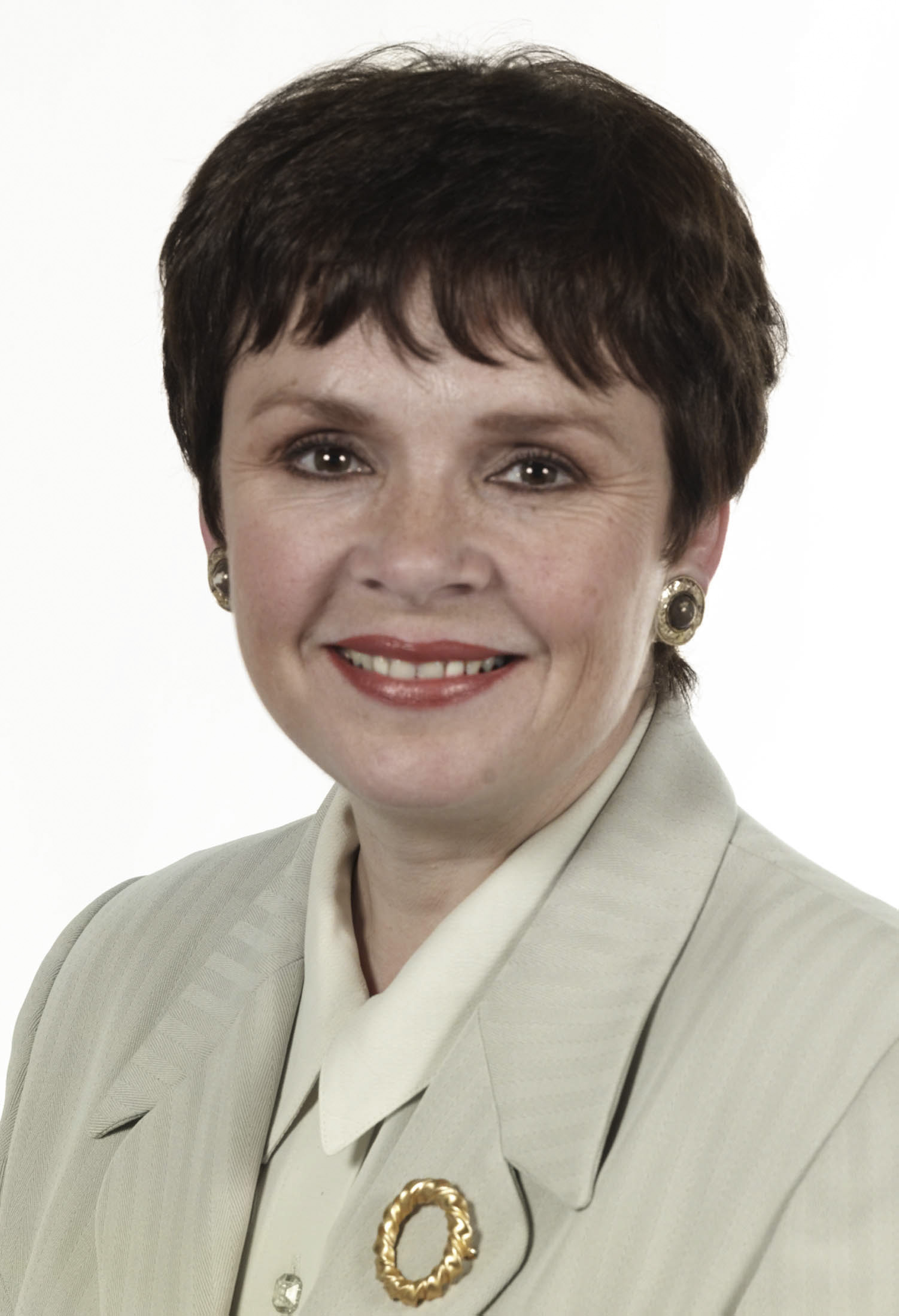

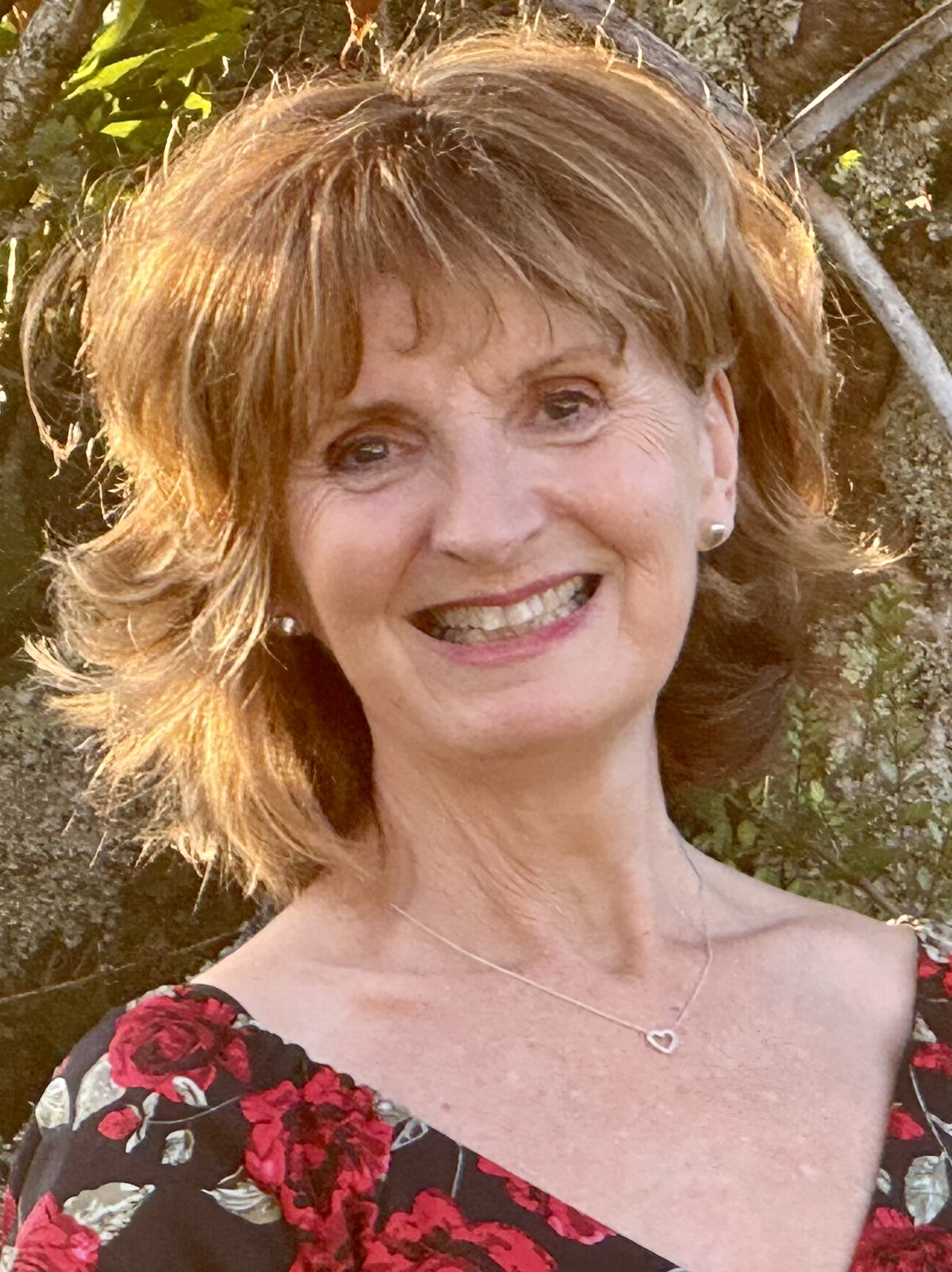
Nominee	Mary McAleese	Mary Banotti	Dana Rosemary Scallon
Party	Fianna Fáil	Fine Gael	Independent
Alliance	Progressive Democrats (Note: The Progressive Democrats helped nominate McAleese)
1st preference	574,424 (45.2%)	372,002 (29.3%)	175,458 (13.8%)
Final count	706,259 (55.6%)	497,516 (39.2%)	Eliminated
		Ind
Nominee	Adi Roche	Derek Nally
Party	Labour	Independent
Alliance	Democratic Left (Note: Democratic Left helped formally nominate Roche); Green Party (Note: The Green Party helped formally nominate Roche)
1st preference	88,423 (7.0%)	59,529 (4.7%)
Final count	Eliminated	Eliminated
President before election
Mary Robinson
Elected President
Mary McAleese
Fianna Fáil

The 1997 Irish presidential election was held on Thursday, 30 October 1997. It was the eleventh presidential election to be held in Ireland, and only the sixth to be contested by more than one candidate. It was held ahead of schedule when incumbent President Mary Robinson resigned to assume her new appointment as the United Nations High Commissioner for Human Rights.

== Candidates ==
The Minister for the Environment and Local Government made the order opening nominations on 15 September, with 30 September as the deadline for nominations. Five people received nominations, the highest number contesting to that point; four of the five were women.

=== Mary McAleese ===
Mary McAleese was selected by Fianna Fáil as their candidate for the presidency. Born in Belfast, she was formerly a journalist with broadcaster, RTÉ, and at the time of her nomination, she was Pro-Vice Chancellor of Queen's University Belfast. Two other candidates, Albert Reynolds and Michael O'Kennedy, had also sought the Fianna Fáil nomination. Reynolds was a former Taoiseach while O'Kennedy was a former cabinet minister having served in the Finance and Foreign Affairs portfolios. Both were also sitting TDs which was seen as an advantage. In the first round of voting, Reynolds received 49 votes, McAleese 42, and O'Kennedy 21. In the second round, McAleese won, with 62 votes to Reynolds's 48. McAleese was later also endorsed by the Progressive Democrats, the smaller party in the coalition government with Fianna Fáil.

=== Mary Banotti ===
Mary Banotti was nominated by Fine Gael. She was the grand-niece of the former Irish leader, Michael Collins, and sister of the deputy leader of the party, Nora Owen. She defeated colleague Avril Doyle for the party nomination in a very close contest. Banotti, who was an MEP at the time, was the only serving politician among the five presidential candidates.

=== Adi Roche ===
Adi Roche, who had founded Chernobyl Children International in 1991, was nominated by the Labour Party. Roche was later endorsed by Democratic Left and the Green Party. At 42 years of age, she was and is the youngest person to stand in an Irish presidential election.

=== Dana Rosemary Scallon ===
Dana Rosemary Scallon received the nominations of five county councils: Donegal, Kerry, Longford, North Tipperary and Wicklow. Scallon was a singer, the winner of the 1970 Eurovision Song Contest, and a family values campaigner. She was the first candidate in any Irish presidential election to have been nominated by local authorities, rather than by Oireachtas members.

=== Derek Nally ===
Derek Nally was the fifth candidate to join the presidential race and the only male candidate. He was a retired Garda and victims' rights campaigner. He also received the nominations of five county councils: Carlow, Clare, Kildare, South Dublin and Wexford.

== Campaign ==
The Presidential campaign, held before the forthcoming Good Friday Agreement of 1998, would become dominated by Northern Ireland issues and questions about candidates' views on Irish Republicanism.

McAleese enjoyed the full backing of the powerful Fianna Fáil electoral machine, and she emphasised her north–south background amid fragile peace prospects, while Banotti stressed her parliamentary experience and family legacy (Banotti was the grand-niece of Michael Collins). Roche campaigned on her international humanitarian credentials. Scallon ran a grassroots "people's campaign" spotlighting family values, and Nally's platform centred on victims’ rights and policing reform.

Adi Roche entered the race in good standing on the back of her charitable work, and initially polled extremely well at 38%, raising the possibility of another upset win by the Labour Party. However, Roche's campaign was severely undermined by a covert smear campaign focused on her brother Dónal de Róiste, a former Army officer who had been summarily and controversially dismissed from the Defence Forces in 1969. Anonymous letters and phone calls were circulated to media outlets during the campaign, suggesting links between her brother and Irish republican paramilitaries. Though no evidence of wrongdoing was ever produced and the allegations were later discredited, the innuendo damaged Roche's polling badly, falling down to 7% shortly before election day. She ultimately placed fourth out of five candidates. In later years, Roche described the experience as traumatising and politically vicious, noting it had a long-lasting impact on her self-confidence. Her brother was formally exonerated and issued a State apology in 2022 after a government review found his dismissal had been legally flawed and procedurally unjust.

Likewise, Mary McAleese was also peppered with questions relating to possible links to Irish republicanism. Questions about Mary McAleese's attitude to Sinn Féin first emerged when the Sunday Business Post of 12 October 1997 published leaked Department of Foreign Affairs memos suggesting she had expressed pleasure at Sinn Féin's electoral performance and would not back a presidential contest without a Sinn Féin–SDLP pact. The memos were quickly seized upon by rival candidate Derek Nally, who accused McAleese of operating "a different set of moral assumptions" compared to "most Irish people", and demanded she explain whether she had ever voted for or supported Sinn Féin. Further speculation mounted following 16 October, when President of Sinn Féin Gerry Adams stated his preferred candidate was McAleese.

On RTÉ's Questions and Answers, journalist Geraldine Kennedy pressed her directly, asking "Did you ever vote for Sinn Féin?". McAleese strenuously denied the accuracy of the leaked documents, issuing a statement through her campaign that she had never voted for Sinn Féin and repudiating any implication of republican sympathy. She subsequently challenged the department official responsible for the leak to legal action, though no lawsuit ensued. The Irish Times editorial later urged her to provide "the frankest explanation" of her views on Sinn Féin and the broader peace process if confidence in her fitness for office was to be restored. Despite the intensity of the controversy, no evidence emerged to substantiate the allegations.

During the campaign, Derek Nally, a former garda and long-standing critic of police brutality, claimed that a group of former gardaí had threatened his life. He called on these individuals to identify themselves, stating: "I want to be able to identify the people who are making the threats and identify my possible assassins". The threat, discussed on RTÉ's Prime Time, allegedly came from those angered by Nally's past whistleblowing against the so-called "heavy gang" within the Garda Síochána in the 1970s. He insisted the group's motives were linked to his efforts back then to expose prisoner mistreatment and misconduct, which he had brought to the attention of then-Minister for Justice Paddy Cooney. Nally also drew parallels with alleged smear attempts against fellow candidate Adi Roche, suggesting there was a campaign by ex-gardaí to undermine certain candidates. However, both the Garda Representative Association and the Association of Garda Sergeants and Inspectors denied any knowledge of such a plot.

=== Opinion polls ===
Last date of polling	Commissioner	Polling firm	Sample size	Sources	McAleese	Banotti	Scallon	Roche	Nally
27 October 1997	The Irish Times	MRBI	?		46%	30%	10%	8%	5%
25 October 1997	Irish Independent	IMS	?		49%	32%	7%	7%	5%
23 October 1997	Irish Independent	IMS	?		45%	32%	10%	8%	5%
22 October 1997	The Irish Times	MRBI	?		42%	33%	9%	9%	6%
11 October 1997	The Irish Times	MRBI	?		39%	29%	8%	16%	9%
27 September 1997	The Irish Times	MRBI	?		40%	27%	8%	25%	(Note: Nally had not yet received enough council nominations to be an official presidential candidate.)

== Result ==
1997 Irish presidential election
Candidate	Nominated by	% 1st Pref	Count 1	Count 2
Mary McAleese	Oireachtas: Fianna Fáil and Progressive Democrats	45.2	574,424	706,259
Mary Banotti	Oireachtas: Fine Gael	29.3	372,002	497,516
Dana Rosemary Scallon	County and City Councils	13.8	175,458	—
Adi Roche	Oireachtas: Labour Party, Democratic Left and Green Party	6.9	88,423	—
Derek Nally	County and City Councils	4.7	59,529	—
Electorate: 2,688,316 Valid: 1,269,836 Spoilt: 9,852 (0.7%) Quota: 634,919 Turnout: 47.6%

First preference vote
McAleese	45.2%
Banotti	29.3%
Scallon	13.8%
Roche	7.0%
Nally	4.7%

Final percentage
McAleese	55.6%
Banotti	39.2%

=== Results by constituency ===
First count votes
Constituency	Banotti	McAleese	Nally	Roche	Scallon
Carlow–Kilkenny	11,962	19,949	3,040	2,936	5,177
Cavan–Monaghan	9,299	21,749	1,122	1,373	6,346
Clare	8,353	17,970	1,637	1,889	5,095
Cork East	8,859	15,598	1,063	3,444	4,450
Cork North-Central	8,348	14,322	1,194	4,808	3,742
Cork North-West	8,214	13,086	776	2,291	3,567
Cork South-Central	12,609	19,410	1,894	5,434	4,461
Cork South-West	8,808	12,616	825	2,208	3,016
Donegal North-East	3,313	11,008	575	748	5,136
Donegal South-West	3,958	11,060	545	826	5,025
Dublin Central	6,864	9,226	1,175	1,605	2,920
Dublin North	10,161	12,599	1,291	1,918	3,364
Dublin North-Central	10,789	12,949	1,342	1,946	4,044
Dublin North-East	8,728	10,132	1,114	1,770	2,890
Dublin North-West	7,806	9,910	1,180	1,769	3,037
Dublin South	18,766	16,053	1,990	2,589	5,360
Dublin South-Central	10,900	10,636	1,375	1,909	3,636
Dublin South-East	12,692	9,338	1,056	1,885	3,403
Dublin South-West	8,879	10,366	1,539	1,833	3,384
Dublin West	8,965	10,678	1,504	1,675	3,363
Dún Laoghaire	18,415	14,310	1,632	2,696	4,882
Galway East	7,352	15,979	1,076	1,285	5,044
Galway West	9,495	16,707	1,437	2,012	5,320
Kerry North	5,266	10,753	689	3,039	3,367
Kerry South	5,384	11,586	778	2,075	3,162
Kildare North	7,657	9,496	1,242	1,483	3,101
Kildare South	6,052	9,204	1,039	1,426	2,372
Laois–Offaly	10,878	20,398	1,739	2,090	6,188
Limerick East	11,529	15,080	1,714	2,235	4,998
Limerick West	6,999	11,823	886	1,201	3,722
Longford–Roscommon	8,212	15,654	1,456	1,159	6,175
Louth	7,322	16,356	1,228	1,983	4,337
Mayo	10,923	21,174	1,348	1,666	6,601
Meath	11,338	18,584	1,487	2,123	5,898
Sligo–Leitrim	7,909	16,162	1,044	1,670	5,290
Tipperary North	7,547	13,316	1,550	2,158	3,802
Tipperary South	6,928	11,865	832	4,187	3,092
Waterford	8,243	15,769	1,406	2,229	3,887
Westmeath	5,969	10,653	1,160	1,561	3,770
Wexford	8,779	16,713	7,405	2,415	4,061
Wicklow	11,532	14,187	2,144	2,874	4,973
Total	372,002	574,424	59,529	88,423	175,458

Second count result
Constituency	Banotti		McAleese	
Constituency	Votes	%	Votes	%
Carlow–Kilkenny	16,474	40.5%	24,295	59.5%
Cavan–Monaghan	12,159	31.9%	26,015	68.1%
Clare	11,542	34.7%	21,766	65.3%
Cork East	12,205	38.9%	19,218	61.1%
Cork North-Central	12,201	40.3%	18,139	59.7%
Cork North-West	10,687	40.4%	15,825	59.6%
Cork South-Central	17,021	41.1%	24,437	58.9%
Cork South-West	11,326	43.0%	15,056	57.0%
Donegal North-East	4,844	25.6%	14,113	74.4%
Donegal South-West	5,573	28.4%	14,060	71.6%
Dublin Central	9,140	44.7%	11,349	55.3%
Dublin North	13,013	46.3%	15,149	53.7%
Dublin North-Central	13,903	46.8%	15,843	53.2%
Dublin North-East	11,114	47.4%	12,374	52.6%
Dublin North-West	10,337	46.0%	12,180	54.0%
Dublin South	23,436	54.3%	19,779	45.7%
Dublin South-Central	13,887	51.4%	13,182	48.6%
Dublin South-East	15,703	57.6%	11,568	42.4%
Dublin South-West	11,734	47.6%	12,920	52.4%
Dublin West	11,848	47.4%	13,199	52.6%
Dún Laoghaire	22,745	56.3%	17,678	43.7%
Galway East	10,003	34.2%	19,318	65.8%
Galway West	12,974	38.9%	20,418	61.1%
Kerry North	7,942	37.0%	13,546	63.0%
Kerry South	7,631	35.2%	14,109	64.8%
Kildare North	10,209	46.6%	11,741	53.4%
Kildare South	7,976	42.0%	11,039	58.0%
Laois–Offaly	14,485	37.0%	24,761	63.0%
Limerick East	15,208	45.2%	18,493	54.8%
Limerick West	9,082	38.9%	14,277	61.1%
Longford–Roscommon	11,216	36.5%	19,555	63.5%
Louth	10,015	34.0%	19,527	66.0%
Mayo	14,343	36.0%	25,551	64.0%
Meath	15,026	40.2%	22,430	59.8%
Sligo–Leitrim	10,729	35.1%	19,912	64.9%
Tipperary North	10,375	38.8%	16,373	61.2%
Tipperary South	10,129	40.3%	15,065	59.7%
Waterford	11,070	37.2%	18,760	62.8%
Westmeath	8,362	38.6%	13,347	61.4%
Wexford	14,143	39.1%	22,064	60.9%
Wicklow	15,706	46.9%	17,828	53.1%
Total	497,516	39.2%	706,259	55.6%
