= Adi Roche =

Irish humanitarian and activist

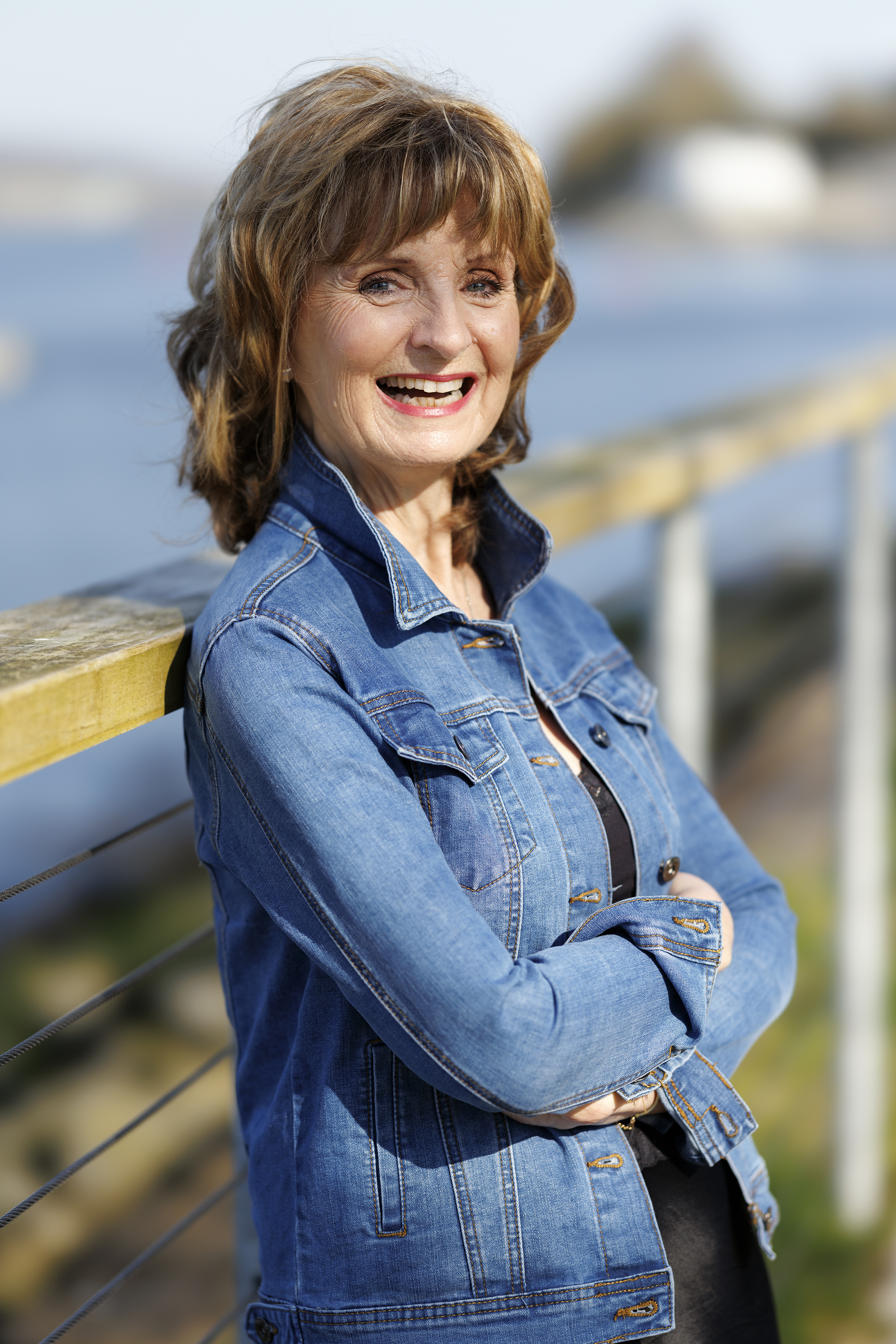
- Roche in 2026
- Born: 11 July 1955 (age 71); Clonmel, County Tipperary, Ireland
- Occupation: CEO of Chernobyl Children International
- Organisation: Chernobyl Children International
- Political party: Independent of all political parties.
- Spouse: Seán Dunne (m. 1977)
- Website: Official website

Adi Marie Roche (born 11 July 1955) is an Irish activist, anti-nuclear advocate, and campaigner for peace, humanitarian aid and education. She founded and is Voluntary CEO of Chernobyl Children's Project International. She has focused on the relief of suffering experienced by children in the wake of the 1986 Chernobyl nuclear disaster. She was an unsuccessful candidate in the 1997 Irish presidential election.

== Early life ==
Adi Roche was born in Clonmel, County Tipperary in 1955. After finishing secondary school, she went to work for Aer Lingus. She left in 1984 to work full-time as a volunteer for the Irish Campaign for Nuclear Disarmament. She devised a Peace Education Programme and delivered it in over fifty schools throughout Ireland. In 1990, she became the first Irish woman elected to the board of directors of the International Peace Bureau at the United Nations in Geneva.

== Chernobyl Children International ==
Roche foundedChernobyl Children International, to provide aid to the children of Belarus, Western Russia and Ukraine following the Chernobyl nuclear disaster of 1986. The organisation works in the areas of international development as well as medical and humanitarian aid. It works with children and families who continue to be affected by the disaster.

Under Roche's leadership, Chernobyl Children International (CCI) has delivered over €110 million to the areas most affected by the Chernobyl disaster and has also claimed that it had enabled over 26,500 children affected by the disaster to come to Ireland for vital medical treatment and recuperation. CCI has expanded its scope to a variety of healthcare-focused missions in Belarus, including building independent living homes for mentally disabled children, founding the country's first baby hospice, and pioneering an adoption agreement between Ireland and Belarus.

To mark the 40th Anniversary of the Chernobyl disaster in 2026, Roche led numerous commemorations throughout Ireland including the unveiling of "Chornobyl Mother" sculpture in partnership with Cork City Council and a special commemoration ceremony at Áras an Uachtaráin hosted by President of Ireland, Catherine Connolly.

== Work with United Nations ==
Roche launched an exhibition of the Chernobyl disaster for the 15th Anniversary of the nuclear accident in the UN Headquarters in New York in 2001. The Chernobyl legacy was demonstrated through digital imagery, photographs and sculpture. Entitled Black Wind, White Land, the exhibition was a month-long, cross-cultural event featuring the works of artists who depicted the suffering caused by the disaster. It was deemed an outstanding success by the UN and had its European Premiere in Dublin in 2002.

She continues to work with the United Nations to highlight the consequences of the Chernobyl disaster. Over the last decade she has contributed to UN-sponsored conferences and symposia on the fallout of Chernobyl. She has addressed Ambassadors to the UN General Assembly, the UNESCO conference on Chernobyl, and the Manchester International Peace Festival. Roche has provided advice and suggestions to the UN Needs Assessment Mission and has made several submissions on how NGOs could best be helped in their attempts to deliver humanitarian aid to the most affected areas in Belarus, Ukraine and western Russia.

In July 2003, she was the keynote speaker at the launch of the International Chernobyl Research and Information Network (ICRIN) in Geneva, Switzerland. The ICRIN is an initiative joint-sponsored by the UN and the Swiss Agency for Development and Co-operation. Roche was appointed to represent NGOs on the Steering Committee of the ICRIN.

To mark the 18th Anniversary of the tragedy in April 2004, Roche was invited to speak at the UN General Assembly at their headquarters in New York and to screen the Oscar award-winning documentary Chernobyl Heart. In 2004, Chernobyl Children International received official NGO status by the U.N. She was also invited by the UNDP to sit on their organising committee, and act as the keynote speaker at the International Chernobyl Conference which was held in Minsk in April 2006 (to mark the 20th Anniversary of the Chernobyl disaster).

On 26 April 2016, the 30th anniversary of the Chernobyl disaster, Roche made a landmark address to the United Nations General Assembly in New York. In an unprecedented move, the Belarusian UN delegation provided her with their speaking time at the General Assembly discussion on Chernobyl in recognition of the international role Ireland and Chernobyl Children International has played in helping the victims of the Chernobyl catastrophe. It was the first time an ordinary person (non-diplomat/non-political figure) was extended the honour of speaking at the UN General Assembly during a country's allocated time.

== Honours and awards ==
Roche was awarded the European Woman Laureate Award following the release of the documentary film Black Wind, White Land (1993) which highlighted the Chernobyl children's suffering. In the same year she received the title of Ireland's Person of the Year.

In 1997, Roche received Tipperary International Peace Award, described as "Ireland's outstanding award for humanitarian work".

In 2007, Roche won the Robert Burns Humanitarian Award.

In 2010, Roche received the World of Children Health Award. Since then, Chernobyl Children International has saved the lives of thousands of children born with congenital heart defects.

In 2015, Roche was named a World of Children Alumni Award Honoree, for the "incredible impact she continues to have in the lives of the children of the Chernobyl region".

Also in 2015, Roche won the Princess Grace Humanitarian Award.

In 2020, Roche was awarded the Ahmadiyya Muslim Peace Prize "for her tireless efforts in advocating for nuclear disarmament and supporting victims of the Chernobyl disaster". The award was only presented to Roche in 2024, due to complications arising from the COVID-19 pandemic and the Russian invasion of Ukraine.

=== Awards ===
- President's Award Tipperary Chamber of Commerce 2019
- Freedom of the City of Cork 2016
- Pride of Ireland Lifetime Achievement Award 2016
- Princess Grace Humanitarian Award 2015
- Top 20 of Ireland's Greatest Women of All Time 2014
- Keynote speaker at the first anniversary commemorations of the Japanese earthquake in Fukushima 2012
- David Chow Humanitarian Award 2008
- Robert Burns Humanitarian Award 2007
- European Person of the Year 1996
- European Woman Laureate Award 1996
- Irish Person of the Year 1996
- First Irish woman elected to the board of directors of the International Peace Bureau in Geneva
- Government appointee on the board of the Radiological Protection Institute of Ireland (RPII)

=== Honorary Degrees ===
- Roche holds an Honorary Doctorate of Laws from the University of Alberta, Canada.
- In 2002 she was jointly awarded a Doctorate of Laws with Ali Hewson by the National University of Ireland, Galway.
- In 2016 she was jointly awarded a Doctorate of Letters with Ali Hewson by the University of Limerick.
- In 2024 Roche was awarded an Honorary Doctorate of Arts from University College Cork.

== Politics ==
Roche stood for the office of President of Ireland at the 1997 presidential election nominated by Labour Party, Democratic Left and the Green Party.

Roche came fourth out of five candidates with almost 7% of the vote.

== See also ==
- Chernobyl Children International
- Effects of the Chernobyl disaster
- Chernobyl Heart
- Chernobyl Shelter Fund
- Black Wind, White Land
- Ali Hewson
- List of Chernobyl-related articles
- List of peace activists
