= Mary McAleese =

President of Ireland from 1997 to 2011

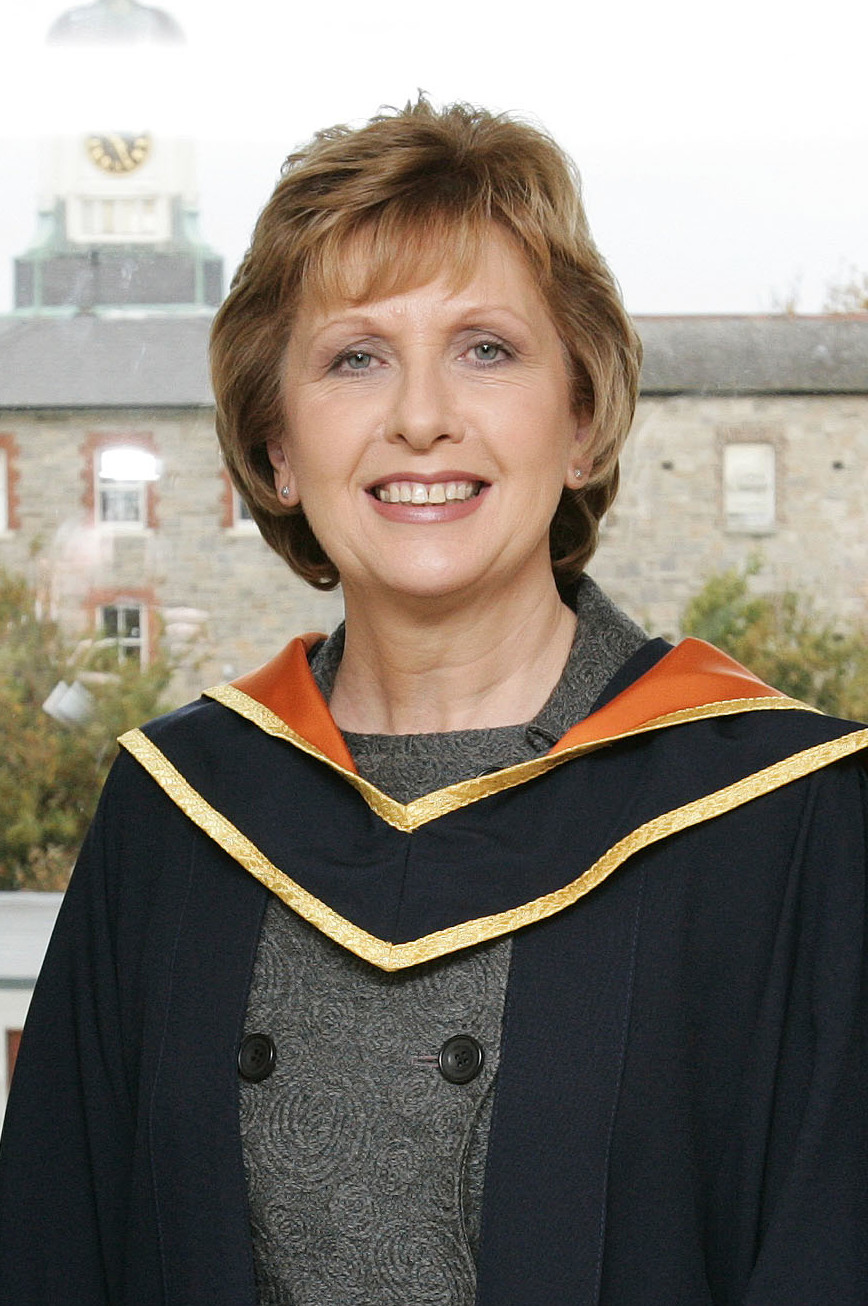
- McAleese in 2007

President of Ireland
- In office 11 November 1997 – 10 November 2011
- Taoiseach: Bertie Ahern; Brian Cowen; Enda Kenny
- Preceded by: Mary Robinson
- Succeeded by: Michael D. Higgins

Personal details
- Born: Mary Patricia Leneghan; 27 June 1951 (age 75) Belfast, Northern Ireland
- Party: Independent (since 1997)
- Other political affiliations: Fianna Fáil (before 1997)
- Spouse: Martin McAleese (m. 1976)
- Children: 3
- Education: Queen's University Belfast; Pontifical Gregorian University
- Profession: Lawyer; civil law; canon law; journalist; politician
- Website: marymcaleese.com

Mary Patricia McAleese (/ˌmækəˈliːs/; née Leneghan; born 27 June 1951) is an Irish activist lawyer, academic, author, and former politician who served as the president of Ireland from November 1997 to November 2011. McAleese was first elected president in 1997, having received the nomination of Fianna Fáil. She succeeded Mary Robinson, making her the second female president of Ireland and the first woman in the world to succeed another woman as president. She nominated herself for re-election in 2004 and was returned unopposed for a second term. Born in Ardoyne, north Belfast, she is the first president of Ireland to come from Ulster.

McAleese graduated in law from Queen's University Belfast. In 1975, she was appointed Professor of Criminal Law, Criminology and Penology at Trinity College Dublin, and in 1987 she returned to her alma mater, Queen's, to become director of the Institute of Professional Legal Studies. In 1994, she became the first female pro-vice-chancellor of Queen's University. She worked as a barrister and as a journalist with RTÉ. She is an Honorary Fellow of St Edmund's College, Cambridge. She has also earned a doctorate in Catholic canon law.

McAleese used her time in office to address issues concerning justice, social equality, social inclusion, anti-sectarianism and reconciliation. She described her presidency's theme as "Building Bridges". This bridge-building materialised in her attempts to reach out to the unionist community in Northern Ireland. These steps included celebrating the Twelfth of July at Áras an Uachtaráin and taking Communion in a Church of Ireland cathedral in Dublin, for which she incurred some criticism from some of the Irish Catholic hierarchy. Though a Catholic, McAleese holds liberal views on homosexuality and women priests. She is a member of the Council of Women World Leaders and was ranked the 64th most powerful woman in the world by Forbes. Despite some minor controversies, McAleese remained popular, and her presidency is regarded as successful.

== Background and family life ==
Born Mary Patricia Leneghan (Irish: Máire Pádraigín Ní Lionnacháin), in Ardoyne, north Belfast to Paddy Leneghan from Croghan, County Roscommon and Claire McManus from County Antrim. She is a Catholic but grew up in a largely Protestant neighbourhood. Loyalists forced her family to leave the area when the Troubles broke out. She was educated at St Dominic's High School, an all-girls Catholic grammar school in Belfast. She studied law at Queen's University Belfast, graduating in 1973 with a Bachelor of Laws (LLB Hons) degree. She was called to the Bar of Northern Ireland in 1974, and was later called to the Irish Bar.

In 1976, she married Martin McAleese, an accountant and dentist. He assisted his wife with some of her initiatives as president. They have three children. Ahead of the 2015 marriage equality referendum, her son spoke publicly about growing up gay.

Every year she spends some time with the Poor Clares.

== Early career ==
In 1975, having spent a year as a practising barrister in Belfast, she was appointed Reid Professor of Criminal Law, Criminology and Penology in Trinity College Dublin, succeeding Mary Robinson. Also in 1975, McAleese chaired a meeting at Liberty Hall that advocated a woman's right to choose and was quoted as saying that "I would see the failure to provide abortion as a human rights issue". She later claimed that she was given to understand that the nature of the meeting was to be a discussion among all sides and opinions.

During the same decade, she was a legal advisor to and a founding member of the Campaign for Homosexual Law Reform. She left this position in 1979, to join RTÉ as a journalist and presenter, during one period as a reporter and presenter for their Frontline replaced by Today Tonight in 1980 programme. However, in RTÉ, she and Alex White (then a TV producer and later a Labour Party TD) were attacked and criticised by a group led by Eoghan Harris, associated with the Workers' Party, over what they perceived as her bias towards republican groups in the North. McAleese was critical of the Provisional IRA, but believed it was important to hear their side of the story; she opposed the Harris faction's support for Section 31 (preventing RTÉ interviews with spokespersons for Sinn Féin and the IRA), which she believed was an attack on free speech. In 1981, she returned to the Reid Professorship, but continued to work part-time for RTÉ for a further four years. In 1987, she returned to Queen's University, to become Director of the Institute of Professional Legal Studies. She stood, unsuccessfully, as a Fianna Fáil candidate in Dublin South-East at the 1987 general election, receiving 2,243 votes (5.9%).

In 1987, McAleese was a prominent opponent of the proposal to ratify the Single European Act during the referendum campaign for the Tenth Amendment of the Constitution of Ireland.

McAleese has a long-standing involvement in ecumenism and anti-sectarianism. She co-chaired the working party on sectarianism set up by the Irish Inter-Church Meeting in 1991 and its report (1993) was described by Professor Marianne Elliot as "the most notable" work of the Inter-Church Meetings. McAleese was the author and presenter of a successful BBC Radio Ulster series called "The Protestant Mind" which encouraged the divided communities in Northern Ireland to try to stand in each other's shoes. McAleese was a member of the Catholic Church Episcopal Delegation to the New Ireland Forum in 1984, and a member of the Catholic Church delegation to the Northern Ireland Commission on Contentious Parades in 1996. She was also a delegate to the 1995 White House Conference on Trade and Investment in Ireland and to the subsequent Pittsburgh Conference in 1996. She became the Pro-Vice-Chancellor of Queen's University Belfast. Prior to becoming president in 1997, McAleese had also held the following positions: Channel 4 Television, Director, Northern Ireland Electricity, Director, Royal Group of Hospitals Trust and Founding member of the Irish Commission for Prisoners Overseas.

McAleese is a member of the Council of Women World Leaders, an international network of current and former women Presidents and Prime Ministers, whose mission is to mobilise the highest-level women leaders globally for collective action on issues of critical importance to women and equitable development.

== Presidency (1997–2011) ==
=== First term (1997–2004) ===
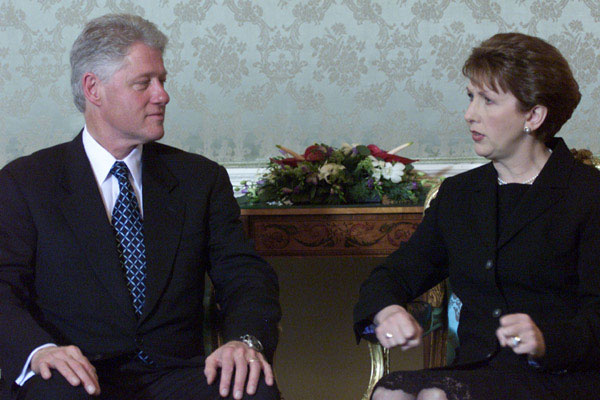
McAleese meets with US President Bill Clinton at Áras an Uachtaráin on 12 December 2000

In 1997, McAleese defeated former Taoiseach Albert Reynolds and former minister Michael O'Kennedy in an internal party election held to determine the Fianna Fáil nomination for the Irish presidency.

Her opponents in the 1997 presidential election were Mary Banotti, nominated by Fine Gael, Adi Roche nominated by the Labour Party, Democratic Left and the Green Party, and two candidates standing as Independents nominated by local authorities: Dana Rosemary Scallon and Derek Nally. McAleese won 45.2% of first preference votes. In the second and final count, McAleese was elected having obtained 55.6% of votes against Banotti. On 11 November 1997, she was inaugurated as the eighth President of Ireland. Within weeks of this, she made her first official overseas trip to Lebanon.

McAleese described the theme of her presidency as "building bridges". The first individual born in Northern Ireland to become President of Ireland, President McAleese was a regular visitor to Northern Ireland throughout her presidency, where she was on the whole warmly welcomed by both communities, confounding critics who had believed she would be a divisive figure. People from Northern Ireland, indeed people from right across the nine-county Province of Ulster, were regular and recurring visitors to Áras an Uachtaráin while she was president. She is also an admirer of Queen Elizabeth II, whom she came to know when she was Pro-Vice-Chancellor of Queen's University of Belfast. In March 1998, President McAleese stated that she would officially celebrate the Twelfth of July as well as Saint Patrick's Day, recognising the day's importance among Ulster Protestants.

She also incurred some criticism from some of the Irish Catholic hierarchy by taking communion in a Church of Ireland (Anglican) Cathedral, in Dublin, on 7 December 1997, although 78 per cent of Irish people approved of her action in a following opinion poll. While Cardinal Desmond Connell called her action a "sham" and a "deception", Taoiseach Bertie Ahern said it was ironic that "the Church was condemning an act of reconciliation and bridge-building between the denominations".

In 1998, she met Cardinal Bernard Law of Boston on an official visit to the United States. In an interview in 2012, she said that Law told her he was "sorry for Catholic Ireland to have you as President" and went on to insult a Minister of State, who was accompanying McAleese. "His remarks were utterly inappropriate and unwelcome," she said. McAleese told the cardinal that she was the "President of Ireland and not just of Catholic Ireland". At this point, a heated argument ensued between the two, according to McAleese.

=== Second term (2004–2011) ===
McAleese's first seven-year term of office ended in November 2004, but she stood for a second term in the 2004 presidential election. Following the failure of any other candidate to secure the necessary support for nomination, the incumbent president stood unopposed, with no political party affiliation, and was declared elected on 1 October 2004. She was re-inaugurated at the commencement of her second seven-year term on 11 November 2004. McAleese's very high approval ratings were widely seen as the reason for her re-election, with no opposition party willing to bear the cost (financial or political) of competing in an election that would prove difficult to win.

On 27 January 2005, following her attendance at the ceremony commemorating the sixtieth anniversary of the liberation of Auschwitz concentration camp, she created friction by referring to the way some Protestant children in Northern Ireland had been raised to hate Catholics, just as European children "for generations, for centuries" were encouraged to hate Jews. These remarks provoked outrage among unionist politicians. McAleese later apologised, conceding that her comments had been unbalanced because she had criticised only the sectarianism found on one side of the community.

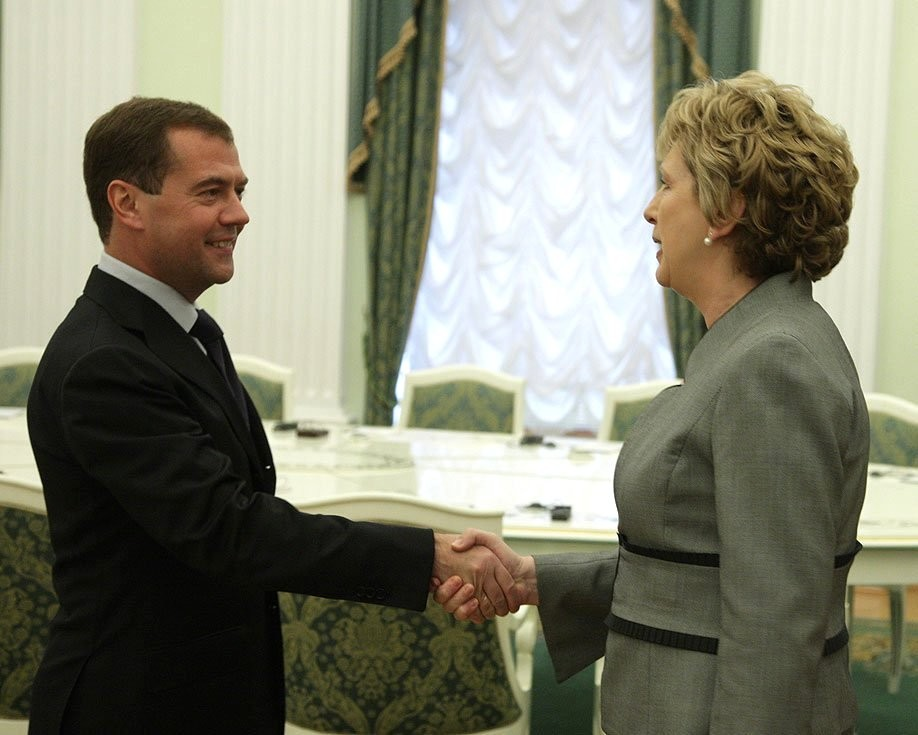
McAleese meets with President of Russia Dmitry Medvedev in 2010

She was the Commencement Speaker at Villanova University in Villanova, Pennsylvania, on 22 May 2005. The visit prompted protests by conservatives because of the president's professing heterodox Catholic views on homosexuality and women in the priesthood. She was the commencement speaker at the University of Notre Dame on 21 May 2006. In her commencement address, among other topics, she spoke of her pride at Notre Dame's Irish heritage, including the nickname the "Fighting Irish".

She attended the funeral of Pope John Paul II on 8 April 2005, and the Papal Inauguration of Pope Benedict XVI on 24 April 2005.

McAleese attended the canonisation by Pope Benedict XVI in Rome of Charles of Mount Argus on 3 June 2007. She was accompanied by her husband, Martin, Cardinal Desmond Connell, Mary Hanafin, the Minister for Education and Science, together with bishops and other pilgrims. She later met the Pope and embarked on other official duties, including a trip to St. Isidore's College, a talk at the Pontifical Irish College and a Mass said especially for the Irish Embassy at Villa Spada chapel.

In August 2007, she spoke out against homophobia at the International Association of Suicide Prevention's 24th Biennial Conference.

She paid a seven-day visit to Hollywood in December 2008, alongside Enterprise Ireland and the Irish Film Board on a mission to promote the Irish film and television industry. A reception held in her honour was attended by Ed Begley, Jr. and Fionnula Flanagan. She later met the Governor of California, Arnold Schwarzenegger.

In 2009, Forbes named her among the hundred most powerful women in the world later that year.

McAleese undertook an official two-day visit to London on 28–29 February 2010, where she visited the site of the 2012 Summer Olympics, and was guest of honour at the Madejski Stadium for a rugby union match between London Irish and Harlequin F.C. On 13 May 2010, she attended the Balmoral Show at the Balmoral Showgrounds, which includes the King's Hall, in south Belfast. Deputy First Minister of Northern Ireland Martin McGuinness and Northern Ireland Agriculture Minister Michelle Gildernew gave her breakfast and walked around with her during the day.

She began an official visit to New York City for several days, on 16 May 2010. She began by appearing at an Irish Voice event in honour of life science. She then addressed business leaders at the New York Stock Exchange to say Irish people were "as mad as hell" over the Irish banking crisis, and opened the An Gorta Mór (Great Famine) exhibition with a speech promising that Ireland's foreign policy focussed on global hunger. She was also present at St. Patrick's Cathedral for a Famine mass and went to the Battery Park City's Irish Hunger Memorial to see the official New York commemoration of the 19th-century Irish Famine. On 22 May 2010, she delivered the keynote address at Fordham University's 165th Commencement.

She opened the Bloom Festival, Ireland's largest gardening show, on 3 June 2010, acknowledging an improved interest in gardening in Ireland, particularly among younger people. On 13 June 2010, McAleese began an official visit to China. She met with Vice President of China Xi Jinping and the pair spoke for 35 minutes over lunch.

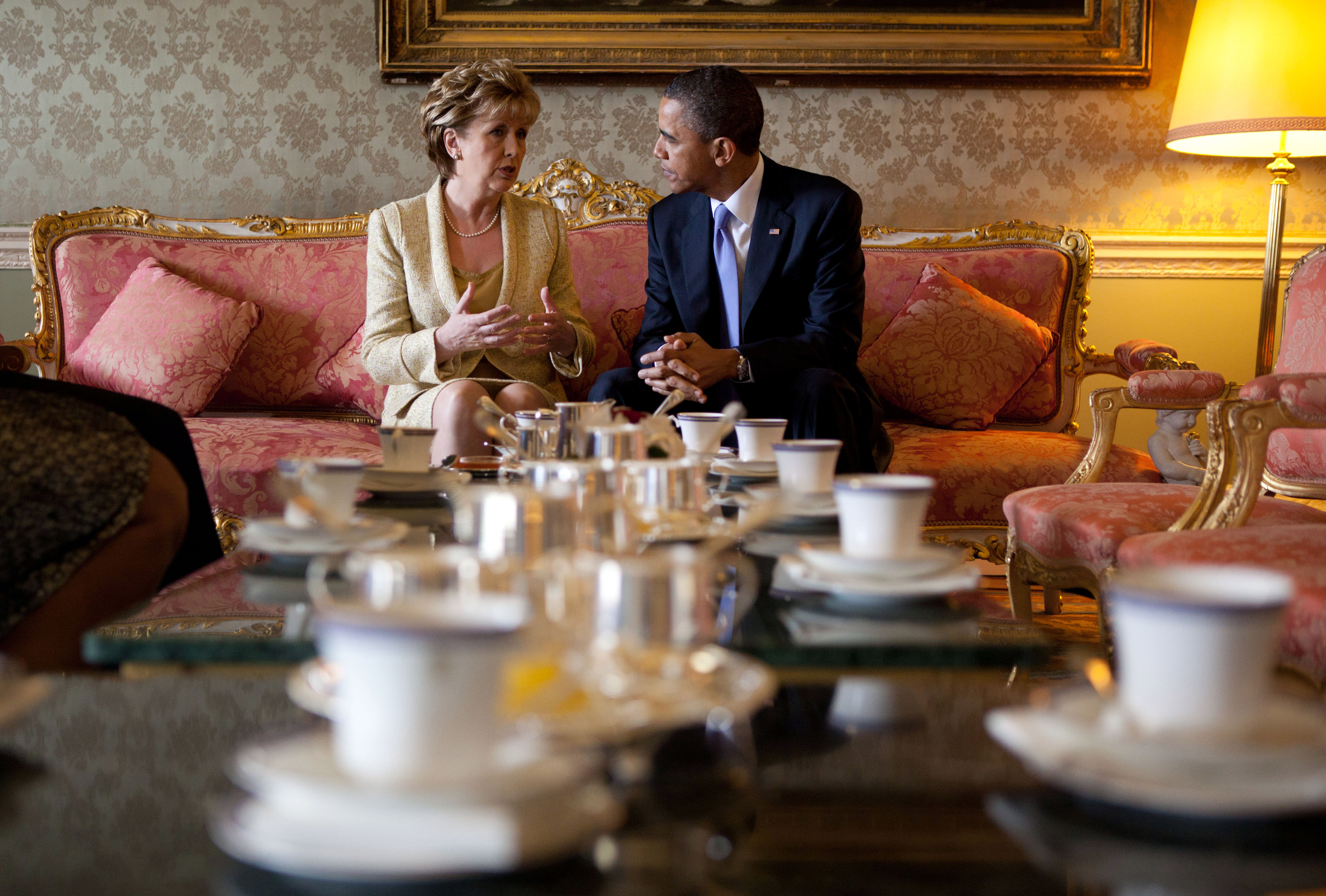
McAleese in discussion with US President Barack Obama at Áras an Uachtaráin on 23 May 2011

She made an official visit to Russia, with Minister of State, Billy Kelleher, for four days in September 2010, and met with President of Russia Dmitry Medvedev. She spoke kindly of Mikhail Gorbachev, officially invited Medvedev to Ireland, and addressed students at a university in Saint Petersburg. She called for warmer relations between the European Union and Russia. On her state tour to Russia, highlighting the importance of competence, she launched an unprecedented attack on the Central Bank of Ireland, for their role in the financial crisis which resulted in tens of thousands of people in mortgage arrears.

The President turned down an invitation to be grand marshal at the 250th St. Patrick's Day Parade in New York City planned for 2011. The parade organisers refused to allow gay people to march under their banner, and there was media speculation that this was the reason for the refusal. A spokesperson for the President's office stated that, while honoured by the invitation, she could not attend because of "scheduling constraints".

In March 2011, President McAleese invited Queen Elizabeth II of the United Kingdom to make a state visit to Ireland. The Queen accepted, and the visit took place from 17 to 20 May 2011, the first state visit by a British monarch since Ireland had gained independence. McAleese had been eager to have the Queen visit Ireland, and the event was widely welcomed as a historic success.

In past media interviews, prior to the Queen's visit, President McAleese had stated on several occasions that the highlight of her presidency to date was the opening ceremony of the 2003 Special Olympics World Games, which she describes as "a time when Ireland was at its superb best". While opening the National Ploughing Championships in County Kildare in September 2011, she spoke of her sadness that she would soon no longer be president, saying: "I'm going to miss it terribly ... I'll miss the people and the engagement with them".

Mary McAleese made her final overseas visit as head of state to Lebanon in October 2011, the location of her very first official overseas visit in 1997. While there she met with Lebanese President Michel Suleiman. Before her trip to Lebanon she visited Derry, on one of her last official engagements to Northern Ireland, becoming the inaugural speaker at the first Conversations Across Walls and Borders event in First Derry Presbyterian Church. She voluntarily donated more than 60 gifts given to her over the 14 years, and worth about €100,000, to the Irish state.

McAleese left office on 10 November 2011; she was succeeded by Michael D. Higgins, who had been elected in the presidential election held on 27 October 2011.

On 10 November 2011, her last day in office, she thanked Ireland for her two terms in an article in The Irish Times. She performed her last official public engagement at a hostel for homeless men in Dublin in the morning and spent the afternoon moving out of Áras an Uachtaráin.

=== Council of State ===
==== Meetings ====
No.	Article	Reserve power	Subject	Outcome
1.	1999 meeting	Address to the Oireachtas	The new millennium	Address given
2.	2000 meeting	Referral of bill to the Supreme Court	Planning and Development Bill 1999; Illegal Immigrants (Trafficking) Bill 1999	Sections of both bills referred (Both upheld)
3.	2002 meeting	Referral of bill to the Supreme Court	Housing (Miscellaneous Provisions) (No. 2) Bill 2001	Bill not referred
4.	2004 meeting	Referral of bill to the Supreme Court	Health (Amendment) (No. 2) Bill 2004	Bill referred (Struck down)
5.	2009 meeting	Referral of bill to the Supreme Court	Criminal Justice (Amendment) Bill 2009; Defamation Bill 2006	Bills not referred
6.	2010 meeting	Referral of bill to the Supreme Court	Credit Institutions (Stabilisation) Bill 2010	Signed without referral

==== Presidential appointees ====
First term

- Gordon Brett
- Brian Crowley
- Ruth Curtis
- Christina Carney Flynn
- Stanislaus Kennedy
- Martin Naughton
- Noel Stewart

Second term

- Harvey Bicker
- Anastasia Crickley
- Mary Davis
- Martin Mansergh
- Enda Marren
- Denis Moloney
- Daráine Mulvihill

== Post-presidency (since 2011) ==
=== Voluntary return of presidential allowance ===
In May 2012, The Irish Times reported that she had voluntarily returned more than €500,000 in unused Presidential Allowance funds, accrued over the 14 years of her term of office as well as gifting the overwhelming majority of the gifts received during her term to the state and Gaisce.

=== Tipperary Peace Prize ===
Mary McAleese along with her husband Martin were awarded the Tipperary Peace Prize in January 2012.

=== Canon law studies ===
In 2018, McAleese was awarded a doctorate in canon law (JCD) from Pontifical Gregorian University. She had previously said that she obtained a master's degree and licentiate in canon law and her interest grew because of her concern about what has been happening in the Church – the sexual abuse scandal, among other things. When McAleese looked at the scandal, she said "I was struck by what investigators said about canon law and canon lawyers. It was a scathing indictment: In not one single incidence of sexual abuse had canon law been able to do anything on the victim's side, nothing useful or helpful."

=== Appointments ===
In 2012, McAleese was announced as the Chair of the European Commission High Level Group on the Modernisation of Higher Education in the European Union. Her work on the Commission earned her the Universitas21 2016 Gilbert Award.

In 2013, McAleese was appointed Chair of the Von Hugel Institute at the University of Cambridge.

In March 2013, McAleese was named as the Burns Scholar at Boston College, USA. In 2014, McAleese was appointed Distinguished Professor in Irish Studies at St Mary's University, Twickenham In 2015, McAleese was visiting fellow at the University of Notre Dame, USA. In 2018 McAleese was awarded a doctorate in Canon Law at the Pontifical Gregorian University.

In October 2017, McAleese was appointed a Canon of the Church of Ireland's Christ Church Cathedral, Dublin and is a regular homilist at services there.

On 1 October 2018, McAleese was appointed Professor of Children, Law and Religion at the University of Glasgow, Scotland, a joint appointment between the university's College of Arts and College of Social Sciences.

On 1 November 2019, McAleese was elected as Chancellor of Trinity College Dublin.

McAleese is an executive fellow of the Notre Dame School of Global Affairs and Chair of the Institute for Global Religions.

=== Podcast host ===
In 2024, McAleese joined forces with broadcaster Mary Kennedy to host the "Changing Times - The Allenwood Conversations" podcast. The podcast is produced by Enda Grace at Dundara Television and Media in Allenwood, County Kildare.

== Catholic Church ==
=== Canon Lawyer ===
McAleese is an alumna of the Pontifical Gregorian University where she obtained her licentiate of canon law in 2014 and a doctorate of canon law in 2018. On 22 September 2018, McAleese publicly defended her thesis on "Children's Rights and Obligations in Canon Law" at the Pontifical Gregorian University.The defence was conducted in Italian. McAleese was questioned by Professor Robert J Geisinger S.J. and Professor Ulrich Rhode S.J. The Archbishop of Dublin, Diarmuid Martin, the Rector of the Pontifical Irish College in Rome and the Irish Ambassadors to Italy and the Holy See attended the defence. McAleese also holds a Masters in Canon Law (2010) from the Milltown Institute of Theology and Philosophy. McAleese delivered the Valedictorian Address at her graduation.

In 2012, McAleese published Quo Vadis? Collegiality in the Code of Canon Law (Columba Press). The book was launched in Rome at the Irish Franciscan College of St. Isidore's and in Dublin at the Redemptorists Centre at Marianella by the Former Chief Justice of Ireland, Ronan Keane

In 2019, McAleese published Children's Rights & Obligations in Canon Law: The Christening Contracts (Brill Publishers).

=== Inclusion of women in the formation of the Catholic Faith ===
In March 2018, McAleese asked "If you are going to exclude women in perpetuity from priesthood and if all decision-making, discernment and policy-making in the Church is going to continue to be filtered through the male priesthood, tell me how in justice and charity, but most importantly in equality, are you going to include the voices of women in the formation of the Catholic faith? What radical, innovative, strategic ideas do you have for their inclusion while being excluded from priesthood? And that's the question they have not answered".

On the ordination of women, McAleese said "I believe that women should be ordained, I believe the theology on which that is based is pure codology. I'm not even going to be bothered arguing it. Sooner or later it'll fall apart, fall asunder under its own dead weight."

On International's Women Day, McAleese described the Catholic Church as "an empire of misogyny". She said "This regrettable situation arises because the Catholic Church has long since been a primary global carrier of the toxic virus of misogyny...Its leadership has never sought a cure for that virus although the cure is freely available. Its name is equality."

In response to her speech, the Archbishop of Dublin Diarmuid Martin said "Her challenge to the internal culture of the Church today was brutally stark. Some may find it unpleasant or unwelcome. I must accept the challenge with the humility of one who recognises her alienation."

=== 2018 Women's Day Conference ===
McAleese was due to speak on a panel at a Voices of Faith conference in the Vatican on International Women's Day in 2018 on Women in the Church. The conference had been held for the previous four years at the Vatican. Irish born Cardinal Kevin Farrell and Prefect of the Dicastery for Laity, Family and Life banned McAleese from speaking in the Vatican. The organisers had not been given any reason for the decision. In response, conference organisers invited McAleese to deliver the keynote speech at the conference and relocated it to a Jesuit conference centre just outside the Vatican.

McAleese initiated a canonical complaint against Kevin Farrell. The complaint was made to the Cardinal's superior – Pope Francis. The Nuncio to Ireland Jude Thaddeus Okolo personally collected the complaint from McAleese's home and delivered it to the Vatican. According to McAleese, she was advised that there was a process for handling such complaints. In November 2019 she said that she had received neither an acknowledgement nor a reply to her complaint.

=== Synod of Bishops on the Family ===
Speaking before the opening of the Ordinary Synod of Bishops on the Family in October 2015, McAleese ridiculed the concept of 300 elderly celibates coming together to discuss family questions. Addressing a meeting of the Global Network of Rainbow (LGBT) Catholics on the eve of the Vatican's Synod on the Family, former president McAleese said: "In the days when I was president, we had workshops on various issues and if I wanted to look at an issue, I would consult the experts... But look at the Synod, I have to ask the question: If I wanted expertise on the family, I honestly cannot say that the first thing that would come into my mind would be to call together 300 celibate males who, as far we know, have never raised a child...Let me repeat a question I asked last year when I saw the Vatican's lengthy pre-Synod questionnaire, namely how many of these men have ever changed a child's nappy? For me that is a very important question because it is one thing to say that we all grew up in families, we had mothers, we had fathers but it is a very different thing to raise a gay child, a very different thing to live daily in a relationship and to police the relationships between children and the world." Acknowledging that the Synod will doubtless be considering the Catholic Church's pastoral approach to homosexuals, McAleese described herself as "cynical" about the outcome of the forthcoming three-week consultation.

=== US Grand Jury Report Pennsylvania ===
On 18 August 2018, McAleese speaking in the aftermath of the US Grand Jury Report on children abused by Catholic Priests in Pennsylvania said the cover up of this abuse "is not only systemic, it was directed from central command and control which is the Vatican ... It strikes me as impossible to believe that all bishops acted equally negligently by coincidence, that's the problem."

=== World Meeting of Families 2018 ===
McAleese said in relation to the World Meeting of Families (held in Dublin in 2018), "It's always been essentially a right-wing rally... and it was designed for that purpose, to rally people to get them motivated to fight against the tide of same-sex marriage, rights for gays, abortion rights, contraceptive rights".

=== Alfons Auer Ethics Award ===
On 23 August 2019, McAleese was announced as the winner of the Alfons Auer Ethics Award, from Tübingen University in Germany for her political dedication in building bridges across divisions in society, especially in the conflict in Northern Ireland, her commitment to reforming the Catholic Church after the sexual abuse scandals, her theological and ethical advocacy for the rights of children, for the complete equality of women in church ministries and for the acceptance of diversity.

=== UN Convention on Rights of the Child ===
On 5 November 2019, McAleese delivered the annual Edmund Burke lecture at Trinity College Dublin. McAleese's lecture was entitled "The Future of Ireland: Human Rights and Children's Rights". In her address McAleese called for "a clear acknowledgement from the Catholic Church that the canon laws which constrict children's rights have now been overtaken by the (UN) Convention and our Constitution" In 2026, she argued that "Baptism denies babies their human rights," stating that "No one is Catholic by birth and the notion of ‘Baptismal promises’ is risible."

=== Threat to leave Church ===
McAleese has written to Pope Francis threatening to quit the Catholic Church if it comes to light the Vatican "failed to act to protect members of the L'Arche community" from the organization's founder Jean Vanier. He founded L'Arche in 1964 to work with intellectually disabled people. On 22 February 2020, L'Arche announced that it had received credible complaints that Vanier had sexually abused at least six women.

== China ==
McAleese strongly promoted closer ties between Ireland and the People's Republic of China, meeting frequently with officials from that country's ruling Chinese Communist Party, including Xi Jinping and former President Hu Jintao. As President of Trinity College, McAleese refused to allow the board to bestow an honorary degree upon the Dalai Lama, noting the Chinese student presence at the university and stating that "honouring the Tibetan monk would undoubtedly cause "serious" problems and consequences with the Chinese ambassador, and added that the Chinese would interpret the award as looking for trouble, as China regarded him as a religious-political leader.". According to the Sunday Independent, Chinese universities "provided the fourth highest amount of non-EU collaborations with Trinity over the previous 10 years, with 581 co-publications."

== LGBT advocacy ==
=== Background ===
In 1975, McAleese and David Norris founded the Campaign for Homosexual Law Reform. McAleese was its legal advisor from 1975 until 1979 when she joined RTÉ as a current affairs journalist.

In a 2008 biography, McAleese explained that she first became aware of the plight of gay people as a student in San Francisco in the early 1970s. She was 21 and studying law at Queen's University Belfast. Her job involved preparing food for airlines; a supervisor, "a charming, lovely man", told her he was gay. They had become friends. He was wounded by being rejected by his family. She recalled, "at school or university I was never aware of ever meeting a gay person, such were the taboos at the time. As a heterosexual, I had wondered what it must be like for those who are outside the mainstream, the self-discovery, when you can reveal it to no one." That man was her introduction to the reality. "When I came back to Ireland I made it my business to do something about it," she said.

=== During Presidency ===
In 2008, McAleese addressed a gay youth forum in Galway and encouraged people to confront those who make anti-gay remarks. McAleese said that being gay was "not a choice but a discovery".

In 2010, McAleese addressed the LGBT Diversity National Conference in Dublin. She said "The toxic attitudes which were heard in homes, streets, workplaces even in schools and churches caused untold suffering and nothing is surer than the fact that those attitudes can have and will have no place in the Ireland we are building, for they belong in the same toxic waste dump along with sexism, racism, sectarianism and all those other contrary forces which would diminish the innate dignity, freedom and nature of the human person, reduce their life chances and opportunities and consign them to half-lived lives.

In 2011, McAleese declined an invitation to be the New York City St Patrick's Day parade Grand Marshal. LGBT people were banned from marching in the parade under LGBT banners.

=== Male suicide ===
In a radio interview discussing her book Quo Vadis? Collegiality in the Code of Canon Law on 28 September 2012, said she was concerned at the growing number of young men, and in particular young gay men, who take their own lives in Ireland. She said that when the research is broken down, it shows that young gay men are one of the most risk-prone groups in Ireland. McAleese said many of these young men will have gone to Catholic schools and they will have heard there their church's attitude to homosexuality. "They will have heard words like 'disorder', they may even have heard the word 'evil' used in relation to homosexual practice," she said. She went on to say "And when they make the discovery, and it is a discovery and not a decision, when they make the discovery, that they are gay, when they are 14, 15 or 16, an internal conflict of absolutely appalling proportions opens up". She said many young gay men are driven into a place that is "dark and bleak". McAleese said she met the Apostolic Nuncio, Archbishop Charles John Brown, shortly after Easter to raise with him her concern about the growing number of suicides among young men in Ireland.

=== Marriage equality referendum ===
In May 2015, in advance of the marriage equality referendum, McAleese described same-sex marriage as a "human rights issue" as she and her husband Martin called for a Yes vote in the upcoming referendum. In her first public comments on the issue, McAleese said the vote next month is "about Ireland's children, gay children" and said passing the referendum would help dismantle the "architecture of homophobia". She also highlighted the problems in Ireland of suicide among young males. "We now know from the evidence that one of the risk groups within that age cohort of 15–25 is the young male homosexual. We owe those children a huge debt as adults who have opportunities to make choices that impact their lives, to make the right choices, choices that will allow their lives to grow organically and give them the joy of being full citizens in their own country."

=== Dublin Pride ===
In June 2018, McAleese attended Dublin Pride for the first time along with her husband, son Justin and his husband Fionán Donohoe. This theme was 'We Are Family', and was a reference to Pope Francis' 2018 visit to Ireland for the Catholic World Meeting of Families. Speaking at the parade she said: "Homophobia is evil. It ruins people's lives, it has ruined families' lives, it has caused people to commit suicide, it has caused people to live in dark shadows, so unsure of themselves," she said.

=== Courage International ===
In 2019 McAleese criticised Catholic group Courage International as “Machiavellian, dangerous and deliberately specious”.

=== LGBT recognition ===
In 2011, McAleese received the GALA Political Figure Award. In 2016, McAleese received the "Ally of the year" award from GALA's.

In 2016, McAleese received The Northern Ireland Tolerantia Award for "her commitment to equal treatment and the dignity of LGB&T people for over four decades".

In August 2018 McAleese was awarded the Vanguard Award at the GAZE LGBT Festival in Dublin.

== Brexit ==
In June 2016, McAleese urged the British to vote to remain in the EU. McAleese warned that Britain's departure could result in the return of border controls on the island of Ireland and cause a "potential drift" in the peace process. McAleese said the "chances of customs controls being reconstituted are probably greater as they had been eliminated by EU laws, not Anglo-Irish efforts". McAleese challenged claims by Boris Johnson and Michael Gove who frequently repeated claims that the position on the island of Ireland would not change. McAleese said, "I don't know that to be (true) and they do not know that".

In 2017, McAleese described Brexit as like "pulling a tooth with 10,000 roots". She said that Northern Ireland will be the only part of the UK that will share a land border with an EU state post-Brexit and she feared that checks between Northern Ireland and the Republic of Ireland would be an inevitable consequence of the UK leaving EU. McAleese said "the lawyer in me says our migration controls are very different, and they are going to be if Britain is no longer part of the EU, and if they tighten the migration controls it won't be enough that I'm entitled to use the Common Travel Area...how are they going to differentiate between me, the person who is entitled to plead the Common Travel Areas, and the person say from France or Germany or Poland who's going to cross the road at Newry, or Derry? My view is that sooner or later the pressure will come to make it an ID card phenomenon...I don't see, in the long run, how we'd get around that". Taoiseach Leo Varadkar responded to McAleese's concerns saying "I understand her concerns but it is one area that I am very sure about that's that there won't be a requirement to produce a passport to travel to Northern Ireland".

On 29 March 2019, McAleese addressed the Brexit Institute at DCU. She said "The process of Brexit has been like watching a political form of necrotising fasciitis as it has devoured time, effort, goodwill, patience, reputations, relationships, engendering huge volumes of work, of anxiety and again, no obvious end in sight. We know that it has rendered the word 'meaningful' completely meaningless." She said "I am heart sorry to see the UK go, to leave the EU, things will not be the same. The future experience will not be the one we envisaged. I harboured a hope that somehow, the United Kingdom would step back from the brink and recommit to the ideal of the European Union, in my view the greatest and the noblest political undertaking ever envisaged and realised in human history. That's a description that is unlikely to ever be attached to Brexit."

== Honours and awards ==
=== Honours ===
- France: McAleese was awarded the Dignité de Grand Officier de l'Ordre National du Mérite – 2019

==== Freedom of the Burgh ====
- (Republic of Ireland) Kilkenny (third living person to be awarded, succeeding Brian Cody and Séamus Pattison. The ceremony, at which she was presented with two hurleys, took place at Kilkenny Castle.) – 19 May 2009

==== Dynastic orders ====
- Dame Grand Cross of the Two Sicilian Royal Sacred Military Constantinian Order of Saint George, Special Class

=== Honorary doctorates, degrees and fellowships ===
- (Republic of Ireland) Member of the Royal Irish Academy – 1998
- (China) Honorary Degree from the Harbin Institute of Technology – 2003
- (Republic of Ireland) Honorary Fellowship of the Royal Colleges of Surgeons – 2006
- (New Zealand) Honorary Doctorate of Laws from the University of Otago – 31 October 2007
- (United States) Honorary Doctorate of Law from the Mount Holyoke College – 24 May 2009
- (United States) Honorary Doctorate of Law from the Fordham University – 22 May 2010
- (United Kingdom) Honorary Fellow of the Royal Society of Edinburgh. – 2012
- (United States) Honorary doctorate at UMass Lowell – 8 November 2013
- (United Kingdom) Honorary Fellow of the Learned Society of Wales – 2017
- (United Kingdom) Honorary Member of the Society of Legal Scholars

=== Awards ===
- (United States) The Silver World Award of the Boy Scouts of America - March 1998
- (United States) The American Ireland Fund Humanitarian Award – 3 May 2007
- (United States) Blessed are the Peacemakers Award from Catholic Theological Union – 17 April 2013
- (Germany) Alfons Auer Ethics Award-2019

=== Other honours and awards ===
On 8 June 2013, a ceremony was held to rename a bridge on the M1 motorway near Drogheda as the Mary McAleese Boyne Valley Bridge to honour McAleese's contribution to the Northern Ireland peace process.

== Bibliography ==
- Love in Chaos: Spiritual Growth and the Search for Peace in Northern Ireland by Mary McAleese. Foreword by Archbishop Desmond Tutu. New York : Continuum, 1999. ISBN 0-8264-1137-1.
- President Mary McAleese: Building Bridges – Selected Speeches and Statements. Foreword by Seamus Heaney. Dublin : The History Press, 2011. ISBN 1-84588-724-7.
- Quo Vadis? Collegiality in the Code of Canon Law, by Mary McAleese, Dublin, Columba Press, 2012. ISBN 978-1856077866
- 5 Years to Save the Irish Church: Talks from the National Columba Books Conference, by Mary McAleese, Mark Patrick Hedderman, Brian D'Arcy, Stan Kennedy, Joe McDonald, Columba, 2018. ISBN 978-1-78218-351-8
- Children's Rights and Obligations in Canon Law, The Christening Contract by Mary McAleese, Brill, 2019. ISBN 978-90-04-41117-3
- Here's the Story, A Memoir, by Mary McAleese, Penguin, 2020. ISBN 9781844884704

Political offices
Preceded by Mary Robinson	President of Ireland; 1997–2011	Succeeded by Michael D. Higgins
Academic offices
Preceded by Mary Robinson	Chancellor of the University of Dublin; 2019–present	Incumbent
