= International Chernobyl Disaster Remembrance Day =

Annual date of international remembrance

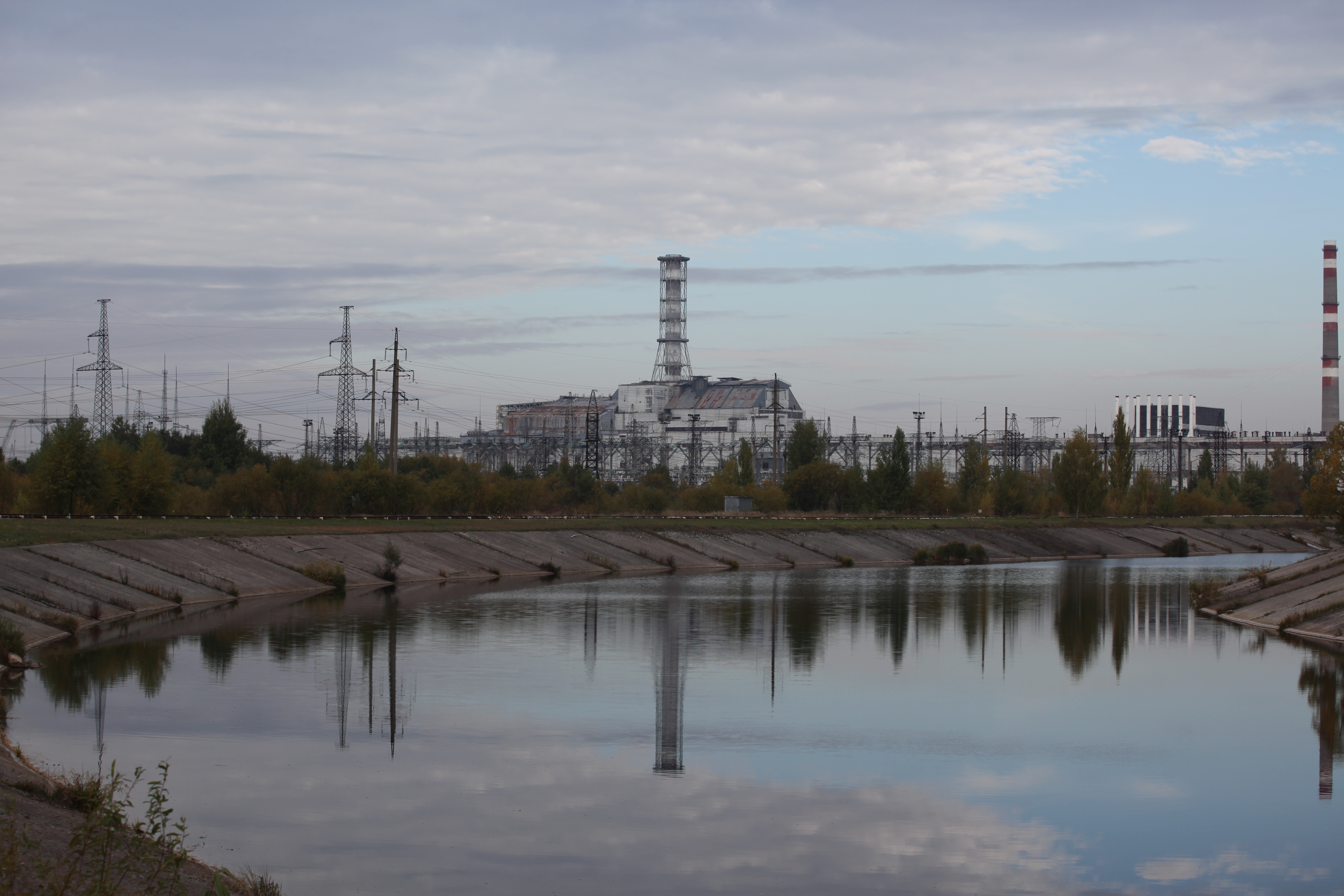
The damaged unit 4 reactor and shelter at Chernobyl.

International Chernobyl Disaster Remembrance Day (Ukrainian: Міжнародний день пам'яті про чорнобильську катастрофу) is a remembrance day, observed annually on April 26. It was established by the United Nations General Assembly on December 8, 2016, in memory of Chernobyl disaster.

In its resolution, the General Assembly recognized that three decades after the disaster there remains persistent serious long-term consequences and that the affected communities and territories are experiencing continuing related needs. The General Assembly invites all Member States, relevant agencies of the United Nations system and other international organizations, as well as civil society, to observe the day.

== See also ==
- Chernobyl Children International
