= EDUN =

Brand of clothing

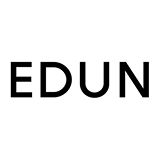
- Industry: Fashion design
- Founded: 2005
- Headquarters: Dublin, Ireland; New York City, United States
- Key people: Ali Hewson (Co-founder); Bono (Co-founder); Julien Labat (Chief executive); Danielle Sherman (Creative director since April 2013); Sharon Wauchob (Creative director 2009–2013); Rogan Gregory (2005–2007)
- Products: Clothing, footwear, handbags

EDUN is a fashion brand founded by Ali Hewson and Bono in 2005 to promote trade in Africa by sourcing production throughout the continent. In 2009 EDUN became part of the LVMH group. In June 2018, LVMH sold their shares back to the founders.

Danielle Sherman was named Creative Director in April 2013. Her first collection debuted during NY Fashion Week, September 2013. The collection includes a range of ready-to-wear, handbags and accessories.

== History ==
In 2005, Hewson and Bono founded the Edun label ("nude" spelled backwards, to suggest both "natural" and the Garden of Eden). It was intended to help bring about positive change in Africa through a fair trade-based relationship rather than by direct aid. Hewson said they wanted "to show that you can make a for-profit business where everybody in the chain is treated well."

In May 2009 the couple sold 49% of the company to LVMH Moët Hennessy Louis Vuitton. The large luxury conglomerate helped the company recruit new management and a new designer after the departure of Rogan Gregory two years before.

Following LVMH's investment in the brand, EDUN appointed a new creative director, Sharon Wauchob. In season 2010 Edun brought back the focus to the runway, which was critical for their new chief executive, Janice Sullivan, former president of Liz Claiborne Inc.'s DKNY Jeans division. The same year Ali Hewson and Bono appeared wearing EDUN in a Louis Vuitton campaign, shot by photographer Annie Leibovitz in Africa.

In April 2013 Danielle Sherman became the creative director for the brand and debuted her first collection SS14 during New York Fashion September 2013.

Julien Labat took over as CEO, May 2015. Labat had most recently worked at French fashion brand Carven as Commercial Director.

In May 2016 Danielle Sherman resigned as creative director of Edun, a role she held for three years, to pursue other opportunities.

From Spring 2017, 80% of EDUN's production is made in Africa and the remaining 20% is produced locally in the US. Collection's sourcing is a mix of organic, recycled, upcycled fabric and some artisanal-custom-made developments from Africa. EDUN just launched its first E-commerce platform recently on Edun.com. The collection also welcomed its first leather bag line, 100% sourced and made in Kenya, signed by an artisanal handle made of recycled polished metal.

EDUN opened its first retail location on 14 September 2017, located at 265 Lafayette Street, New York City.

== Mission ==
In 2008, Edun established the Conservation Cotton Initiative Uganda (CCIU), which provides funding, training and enterprise support to cotton farmers to help build sustainable businesses in Northern Uganda.

== Edun Live ==
In 2007, Edun launched the division Edun Live, a tee-shirt business which is 100% grown and sewn in Africa.

== DIESEL + EDUN ==
In January 2012, Italian fashion entrepreneur and "jeans genius" Renzo Rosso of the Diesel group, Hewson and Bono travelled to north Uganda, where EDUN's Conservation Cotton Initiative (CCI) is based, and to Dioro in Mali, which is house of the Only The Brave Foundation Millennium Village, a project of the Earth Institute at Columbia University, the United Nations Development Programme, the Millennium Promise, and Renzo Rosso. This African journey encouraged them to join their forces for a new Diesel+Edun label that will be made entirely in Africa to generate sustainable development and raise awareness of the creative opportunities in the continent.

== Source of manufacturing ==
By 2010, most of the company's fashion line manufacturing was in China, while simpler garments were still African-made. This gave some negative publicity to the brand. Hewson said that business realities compelled this action, but that over time she hoped more work could be done in Africa. Since its founding in 2007, Edun Live has produced 700,000 African made t-shirts. Hewson calls this venture 100 percent African grow-to-sew initiative. Hewson said in March 2011, "There is a misconception that we moved business out of Africa. We didn’t. We’re now working in eight factories in Africa whereas this time last year we were in two. We’ve actually grown our Edun business in Africa and by 2013, it will be up to 40%". The company now produces 85% of its collection in Africa.
