= Chernobyl Heart =

- Directed by: Maryann DeLeo
- Produced by: Maryann DeLeo
- Edited by: John Custodio
- Production company: Downtown Community Television Center
- Distributed by: HBO
- Release date: 2003
- Running time: 39 minutes
- Country: United States

Chernobyl Heart is a 2003 documentary film by Maryann DeLeo. The film won the Best Documentary Short Subject award at The 76th Academy Awards.

In the film, DeLeo travels through Ukraine and Belarus with Adi Roche, the Irish founder of the Chernobyl Children's Project International, observing the effects of the Chernobyl nuclear disaster on the health of children in the area. Many children developed a previously unknown cardiac degradation condition known in the area as "Chernobyl heart", in addition to other severe radiation poisoning effects.

DeLeo explored the Chernobyl disaster again in 2008 with the film White Horse.

== Broadcast and release details ==
- Chernobyl Heart was shown to the United Nations General Assembly on 28 April 2004.
- The film was broadcast in the United States by HBO on 9 September 2004.
- It was shown in Australia on 26 April 2005 as part of the Australian Broadcasting Corporation's Foreign Correspondent program.

== See also ==
- Chernobyl Children's Project International
- White Horse (film)
- Zone of alienation
- Ventricular septal defect (VSD)
- List of books about nuclear issues
- List of Chernobyl-related articles
- The Truth About Chernobyl
- Chernobyl. Vengeance of peaceful atom.
