= Chernobyl Children International =

Non-profit organization

- Founder: Adi Roche
- Type: Health, Humanitarian Charity
- Purpose: Chernobyl nuclear disaster
- Location(s): Cork, Ireland; Northport, New York, United States
- Region served: Belarus, Ukraine, European Russia
- Website: www.chernobyl-international.com
- Formerly called: Chernobyl Children's Project International

Chernobyl Children International (CCI) is a non-profit, international development, medical, and humanitarian organisation that works with children, families and communities that continue to be affected by the economic outcome of the 1986 Chernobyl accident. The organisation's founder and chief executive is Adi Roche. Before 2010, it was known as Chernobyl Children's Project International (CCPI).

== History ==
Chernobyl Children's Project International was founded in Ireland by Adi Roche in response to an appeal from Belarusian doctors for aid. Roche, previously a volunteer in the Irish Campaign for Nuclear Disarmament, received a fax which read "SOS appeal. For god's sake, please help us get the children out," which inspired her to take action. That year, Roche set up a small workspace in a spare bedroom of her home and began organising 'rest and recuperation' holidays for a few Chernobyl children. Recruiting Irish families who would welcome and care for them. It changed its name to Chernobyl Children International in 2010.

Over its lifetime, the organisation has grown to become the single largest contributor to Belarus and the fallout from Chernobyl. It works closely with the Belarusian government, the United Nations and thousands of volunteers in Ireland, Belarus and worldwide to deliver a broad range of supports to the children and the wider community. It also acts as an advocate for the rights of those affected by the Chernobyl explosion, and engages in research and outreach activities to encourage the rest of the world to remember the victims and understand the long-term impact on their lives.

As of 2026, Chernobyl Children International's contributions exceed €110 million in direct and indirect aid. Its flagship 'Rest and Recuperation Programme' has brought over 26,500 children to Ireland, returning an average of two years to each child's lifespan. Following advocacy by Voluntary CEO at the United Nations General Assembly on the 30th Anniversary of the disaster, the UN designated the 26 April to be known as 'International Chernobyl Disaster Remembrance Day'.

== Programmes ==
Chernobyl Children International works with families and communities in Chernobyl affected regions to help them to overcome the domino effect of poverty, poor health, and social and psychosocial impact that was the aftermath of the Chernobyl nuclear disaster.

Active programmes of Chernobyl Children International include:

- 'Flying Doctors' Cardiac Programme: CCI sends surgical teams into Ukraine to perform operations and train local doctors. 4,250 surgeries have been performed by CCI doctors to date.
- Nursing and therapeutic training programs: CCI sends volunteer nurses and physical/occupational/speech-language therapists to Chernobyl affected regions to work directly with children in understaffed medical institutions and provide training to their local counterparts.
- Community centers and programs: Ten new centres have been built or refurbished giving educational, medical and social services to populations of over 30,000 per centre.
- 'Homes of Hope': CCI's ‘Homes of Hope’ programme provides the alternative to state institutions via 30 homes that have been purchased and renovated; this is the equivalent of closing two orphanages in Belarus. It takes children out of orphanages, and places them these non-state homes. In 2010 the Garda Siochána presented a cheque of 70,000 euros, to house ten orphans.
- Rest and Recuperation programs: CCI has sponsored over 25,500 children from contaminated areas to spend summer and winter holidays families in Ireland. CCI hosted many other children in camps in their home country of Belarus, including special camps for children recovering from heart surgery and cancer, and seriously disabled children.
- Hospice: CCI has built and equipped the first ever baby hospice in Belarus. CCI has provided expert training to the staff to ensure the best care to patients.
- "Aid Direct" humanitarian aid: CCI purchases and delivers necessary medical and humanitarian supplies in Belarus, for delivery to project sites and community centers throughout the country.
- De-insitututionalisation Programmes: CCI have pioneered multiple programmes that support and enable young people to live freely within their communities, away from institutions.

== Volunteers ==
As a charitable, non-profit organisation, Chernobyl Children International relies heavily on the contribution of thousands of volunteers. CCI's volunteers are organised into three programmes:

- Medical Programme: Doctors, nurses, surgeons and dentists offer their time and talents to provide medical treatments and hospice care to the children of Chernobyl. Their efforts have saved the lives of thousands of children and reduced the pain and suffering of thousands more.
- Building and Construction Programme: Skilled electricians, builders and carpenters put their talents to work in building, refurbishing and renovating much-needed institutions, such as day-care centres, medical centres and asylums, and foster homes known as "Homes of Hope". These volunteers put a safe roof over the heads of some of Belarus's most vulnerable children and families, improving their health, sanitation, and comfort levels.
- Rest and Recuperation Programme: Families across Ireland opened their homes and their hearts to more than 26,500 children affected by the Chernobyl disaster, giving them a chance to recover from the ravages of the toxic environment in which they are forced to live. Volunteers from Ireland and America also travel to Belarus each year to help run in-country rest and recuperation camps for children too ill to travel to Ireland.

The organisation also helps and maintains Volunteer Outreach Groups that are located throughout Ireland and Northern Ireland. The Outreach groups organise their own awareness and fundraising events in aid of CCI, and have helped raise millions of Euro for the victims of Chernobyl.

== Board of directors ==
Chernobyl Children International is overseen by an eight-person board of directors. Its membership includes Roche, Ali Hewson, Noel Kelly, and Liz O'Donnell. Peter Lacy is the Chairperson of the Board of Directors.

Hewson, the wife of U2's lead singer Bono, is one of the organisation's more visible members and patrons and has made a number of trips with the group to the Chernobyl-affected areas. All proceeds from U2's 1998 single, "Sweetest Thing", were donated to the organisation and Bono recorded a tribute video to mark the 40th Anniversary of the disaster in 2026.

== Recognition ==
Chernobyl Children's Project International was the focus of the 2003 film Chernobyl Heart, which won the Academy Award for Best Documentary (Short Subject).

The organization's volunteer activities were featured in the 26 April 2006 edition of People magazine.

The organization was awarded Special Congressional Recognition in 2006, for "outstanding humanitarian work".

== See also ==
- List of Chernobyl-related charities
- Chernobyl disaster effects
- Chernobyl Shelter Fund
