= MV Solo =

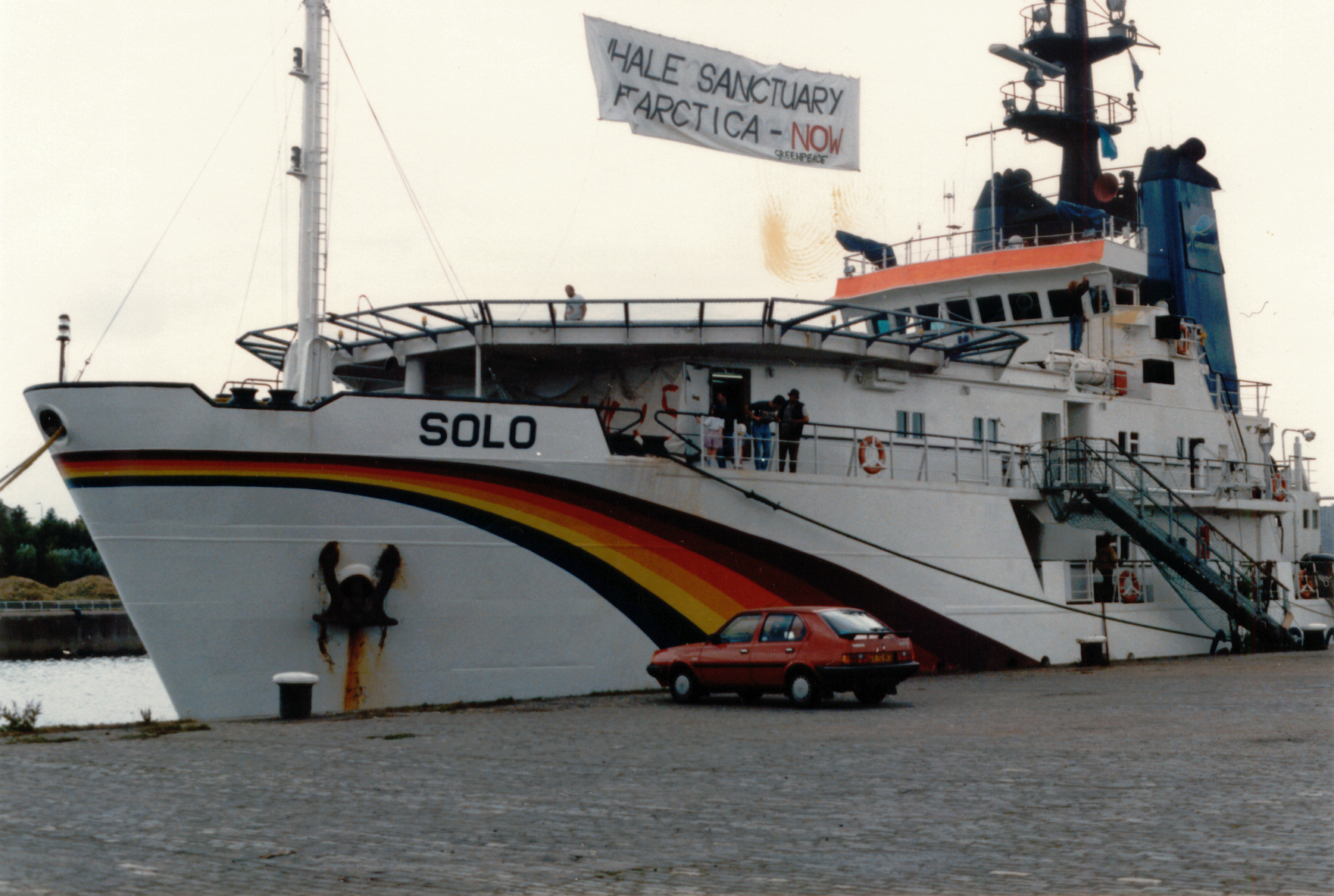
- Solo in Glasgow

History
- Name: Smit Houston
- Owner: Smit International
- Port of registry: Rotterdam, Netherlands
- Builder: Verolme scheepswerf, Heusden
- Yard number: 935
- Launched: 11 December 1976
- Completed: 12 May 1977
- Name: Solo
- Operator: Greenpeace
- Port of registry: Rotterdam, Netherlands
- Acquired: 1990
- Out of service: 1995
- Name: Waker
- Port of registry: Rotterdam, Netherlands
- Acquired: 1995
- Out of service: 2009
- Identification: IMO number: 7522124; Call sign: PILX
- Fate: Scrapped in 2009

General characteristics
- Class & type: LR 100 A1 tug X LMC-Oceangoing service
- Tonnage: 2,167 GT
- Length: 67.50 m (221 ft 5 in)
- Beam: 14.55 m (47 ft 9 in)
- Draught: 6.234 m (20 ft 5.4 in)
- Propulsion: Two 6-cylinder line engine; 2 x propellers
- Boats & landing craft carried: 1 Hooley 300 bhp Volvo Penta Hamilton Jet.; 3 Avon D465 RIB
- Capacity: 44

MV Solo was a Greenpeace ship from 1990 to 1995, originally built in 1977 as an ocean tug called the Smit Houston. Greenpeace updated the ship with a helipad as well as veterinary and laboratory facilities. In 1995 she was chartered by a company working with the Dutch Ministry of Transport, Public Works and Water Management for use as a salvage vessel. At this time the ship was renamed as the ETV Waker. On 7 September 2009, a fire starting in the engine room so seriously damaged the vessel that she was scrapped.
