= Chernobyl Shelter Fund =

Pooled capital aiding reactor cleanup

The Chernobyl Shelter Fund (CSF) was set up in December 1997 with the purpose of funding the Shelter Implementation Plan (SIP). The aim of the fund is to create conditions for the dismantling and decomposition of the radiation contaminated structures. At the end of the three- to four-year project, estimated to cost US$667 million, the Shelter will be transformed into a stable and environmentally safe system for an estimated 100 years. The most visible aspect of this transformation is the construction of the New Safe Confinement. The European Bank for Reconstruction and Development (EBRD) was entrusted with managing the CSF.

== Foundation and Members ==
The initiative for the establishment of the CSF has been led by G7 governments, the European Commission and Ukraine and was announced at the 1997 G7 summit in Denver. The following countries are contributors to CSF: Canada, China, France, Germany, Ireland, Italy, Kazakhstan, Kuwait, Poland, Russia, Saudi Arabia, Switzerland, Ukraine, United Kingdom, and United States.

Besides member countries, the following countries made donations: Argentina, Azerbaijan, Croatia, Hungary, India, Liechtenstein, and Turkey.

== See also ==
- List of Chernobyl-related charities
- List of Chernobyl-related articles
