= Ladies who lunch =

Phrase for well-off women

Ladies who lunch is a phrase often used to describe well-off, well-dressed women who meet for social luncheons, usually during the working week. Typically, the women involved are married and non-working. Normally the lunch is in a high-class restaurant, but could also take place in a department store during a shopping trip. Sometimes the lunch takes place under the pretext of raising money for charity.

== History ==
The origins of the phrase are disputed. Some claim it was coined by Women's Wear Daily publisher John Fairchild in the 1960s, others that it was first introduced in the January 19, 1970, issue of New York magazine by the writer Merle Rubine,

"Anyone with a fair figure, ready cash, fashion savvy and a safecracker's nerve can buy the best that Fifth Avenue has to offer on Seventh Avenue at half the price. The girls at Condé Nast and Harper's Bazaar have known this for years. Likewise the ladies who lunch at Restaurant X, although they'd rather be banished from the banquette than admit they got their Beenes and Blasses on a bargain basis."

The phrase was later popularized by a song of the same name in Stephen Sondheim's 1970 musical Company. The character Joanne, played by Elaine Stritch, a rich, cynical, middle-aged woman, makes a drunken toast to her peer group in The Ladies Who Lunch. The lyrics offer a sardonic toast to rich women, including herself, who fill their time with frivolous things like luncheons and parties. The song has given the phrase "ladies who lunch" a negative connotation. Joanne's condemnation of women who are "off to the gym, then to a fitting, claiming they're fat" does not paint these women in a generous light. Ladies who lunch are often seen as lacking substance.

== Other cultural references ==
“Ladies Who Lunch” was the title of a sketch on the Season 36 premiere of Saturday Night Live hosted by Amy Poehler. In the sketch, four upper-class women, played by Amy Poehler, Kristen Wiig, Vanessa Bayer and Abby Elliott, eat lunch at the fictional restaurant Chez Henri. Sylvia (Wiig's character) is constantly upstaged by Trish (Poehler's character). Bayer's character and Elliott's character fawn over Trish's tiny hats. Sylvia gets jealous and also attempts to wear small hats, but Trish pulls crazy stunts and is always able to upstage Sylvia. At the end, Trish pulls the biggest stunt of all and fakes her own death, winning the approval and amusement of her friends and causing Sylvia to realize that she cannot best Trish. The title alludes to the frivolity of the lives of socialites. The women only seem to care about the next trend in fashion and little about their actual friends.

The ABC television series Desperate Housewives featured an episode entitled "The Ladies Who Lunch". The show has named several episodes after songs by Stephen Sondheim. It was originally aired as Episode 16 on March 27, 2005.

In Arrested Development, The Balboa Bay Window, which is a fictitious high-culture magazine made up for the purpose of the show, features the byline "The Magazine of The American Society of Ladies Who Lunch - A Lot."

The novel The Ladies Who Lunch: A Middle Aged Women's Guide to Modern Morality by Ruth L. Kern tells the story of a group of glamorous middle-aged women in the upper echelons of society.

The song ‘Ladies Who Lunch With Me’ by British-Korean band Wooze details the class aspirations and unwritten social conventions of upper class women.
