= List of heads of state of Ireland =

Below is a list of heads of state of Ireland.

== Kings of Ireland (1542–1922) ==
The title "King of Ireland" was created by an act of the Irish Parliament in 1541, replacing the Lordship of Ireland, which had existed since 1171, with the Kingdom of Ireland.

British monarchs:

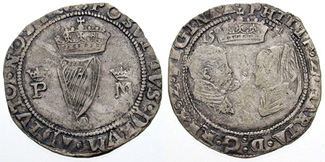
An Irish groat depicting Philip and Mary

- Henry VIII (1542–1547); Lord of Ireland 1509–1542; made king by the Crown of Ireland Act 1542
- Edward VI (1547–1553)
- Lady Jane Grey (1553; disputed)
- Mary I (1553–1558)
  - Philip jure uxoris (1554–1558); his role as King of Ireland was reinforced by the Treason Act 1554
- Elizabeth I (1558–1603)
- James I (1603–1625)
- Charles I (1625–1649)

The Wars of the Three Kingdoms (incorporating the Irish Rebellion of 1641, Confederate Ireland, the Cromwellian conquest of Ireland and the Irish Confederate Wars) took place between 1639 and 1651. Charles I was executed in 1649 and his son Charles II was recognised by some Irish lords as King of Ireland. The Interregnum began with England, Ireland, Scotland and Wales ruled by the Council of State, then the Lord Protector Oliver Cromwell (1649–1658) and his son Richard Cromwell (1658–1659). The Restoration in Ireland was effected in 1660 without major opposition, Charles II being declared king on 14 May 1660 by the Irish Convention.

- Charles II (1660–1685)
- James II (1685–1689)
- William III (1689–1702) & Mary II (1689–1694)

The position of King of Ireland was contested by William III and James II between 1689 and 1691, after the Glorious Revolution of 1688. The Crown and Parliament Recognition Act 1689 made William King of Ireland, and this was reinforced by his victory at the Battle of the Boyne (part of the Williamite War in Ireland).

- Anne (1702–1714)
  - The Acts of Union 1707 united the Kingdom of England and Kingdom of Scotland to form the Kingdom of Great Britain. However, the Kingdom of Ireland remained a separate state.
- George I (1714–1727)
- George II (1727–1760)
- George III (1760–1800)

The Acts of Union 1800, instituted in reaction to the Irish Rebellion of 1798, created the United Kingdom of Great Britain and Ireland.

- George III (1801–1820)
- George IV (1820–1830)
- William IV (1830–1837)
- Victoria (1837–1901)
- Edward VII (1901–1910)
- George V (1910–1922)

== Irish Republic (1919–1922) ==
=== List of office-holders ===
- Cathal Brugha (21 January 1919 – 1 April 1919)
- Éamon de Valera (1 April 1919 – 9 January 1922)
- Arthur Griffith (10 January 1922 – 12 August 1922)
- Michael Collins (16 January 1922 – 22 August 1922)
- W. T. Cosgrave (22 August 1922 – 6 December 1922)

== Kings of the Irish Free State and Ireland (1922–1936) ==
The royal arms of Ireland – Badge of Ireland, used during the period of the Kingdom of Ireland on coins, etc.

- George V (1922–1936) (The Irish Free State became a self-governing Dominion of the British Empire and subsequently, in 1931, a legislatively independent country.)
- Edward VIII (1936)
- Arguably George VI (1936–1949), for external purposes only, whose status was diminished (see Irish head of state from 1922 to 1949).

Following the Ireland Act 1949, only that part of Ireland known as Northern Ireland remained part of a monarchy.

=== Governors-General of the Irish Free State ===
The governor-general was appointed by the King on the advice of his Irish ministers. Initially, the British government had some involvement in the appointment process. However, this ended following the 1926 Imperial Conference; thenceforth, only the government of the Irish Free State was formally involved. A further effect of the 1926 conference (in particular, of the Balfour Declaration) was that the monarch also ceased to receive formal advice from the British government in relation to his role in the Irish Free State; such advice thenceforth came officially only from the Executive Council of the Irish Free State (the Cabinet).

No.	Governor-General (Birth–Death)	Portrait	Tenure		Monarch	President
No.	Governor-General (Birth–Death)	Portrait	Took office	Left office	Monarch	President
1.	Tim Healy (1855–1931)		6 December 1922	31 January 1928	George V	W. T. Cosgrave (1922–1932)
2.	James McNeill (1869–1938)		31 January 1928	1 November 1932	George V	W. T. Cosgrave (1922–1932)
3.	Domhnall Ua Buachalla (1866–1963)		27 November 1932	11 December 1936	George V Edward VIII	Éamon de Valera (1932–1948)

== Presidents of Ireland (1938–present) ==
The office of president was established in 1937, in part as a replacement for the office of governor-general that existed during the 1922–1937 Irish Free State. The seven-year term of office of the president was inspired by that of the presidents of Weimar Germany. At the time the office was established critics warned that the post might lead to the emergence of a dictatorship. However, these fears were not borne out as successive presidents played a limited, largely apolitical role in national affairs.

The functions of the president were exercised by the Presidential Commission from the coming into force of the Constitution on 29 December 1937 until the coming into office of Douglas Hyde in 1938, and during the vacancies of 1974, 1976, and 1997.

No.	Name (birth–death)	Portrait	Previous service	Term of office		Political party	Election
1	Douglas Hyde (1860–1949)		Senator (1922–1925, 1938)	25 June 1938	24 June 1945	Fianna Fáil	1938
1	Douglas Hyde (1860–1949)		Senator (1922–1925, 1938)	25 June 1938	24 June 1945	Fine Gael	1938
2	Seán T. O'Kelly (1882–1966)		Tánaiste (1932–1945)	25 June 1945	24 June 1959	Fianna Fáil	1945
2	Seán T. O'Kelly (1882–1966)		Tánaiste (1932–1945)	25 June 1945	24 June 1959	Independent	1952
3	Éamon de Valera (1882–1975)		Taoiseach (1932–1948, 1951–1954, 1957–1959)	25 June 1959	24 June 1973	Fianna Fáil	1959
3	Éamon de Valera (1882–1975)		Taoiseach (1932–1948, 1951–1954, 1957–1959)	25 June 1959	24 June 1973	Fianna Fáil	1966
4	Erskine Hamilton Childers (1905–1974)		Tánaiste (1969–1973)	25 June 1973	17 November 1974	Fianna Fáil	1973
5	Cearbhall Ó Dálaigh (1911–1978)		Chief Justice of Ireland (1961–1973)	19 December 1974	22 October 1976	All-party nomination	1974
6	Patrick Hillery (1923–2008)		European Commissioner for Social Affairs (1973–1976)	3 December 1976	2 December 1990	Fianna Fáil	1976
6	Patrick Hillery (1923–2008)		European Commissioner for Social Affairs (1973–1976)	3 December 1976	2 December 1990	Independent	1983
7	Mary Robinson (born 1944)		Senator (1969–1989)	3 December 1990	12 September 1997	Labour Party	1990
7	Mary Robinson (born 1944)		Senator (1969–1989)	3 December 1990	12 September 1997	Workers' Party	1990
7	Mary Robinson (born 1944)		Senator (1969–1989)	3 December 1990	12 September 1997	Independent	1990
8	Mary McAleese (born 1951)		Reid Professor of Criminal law, Criminology and Penology at Trinity College Dublin	11 November 1997	10 November 2011	Fianna Fáil	1997
8	Mary McAleese (born 1951)		Reid Professor of Criminal law, Criminology and Penology at Trinity College Dublin	11 November 1997	10 November 2011	Progressive Democrats	1997
8	Mary McAleese (born 1951)		Reid Professor of Criminal law, Criminology and Penology at Trinity College Dublin	11 November 1997	10 November 2011	Independent	2004
9	Michael D. Higgins (born 1941)		Minister for Arts, Culture and Gaeltacht (1993–1997)	11 November 2011	10 November 2025	Labour Party	2011
9	Michael D. Higgins (born 1941)		Minister for Arts, Culture and Gaeltacht (1993–1997)	11 November 2011	10 November 2025	Independent	2018
10	Catherine Connolly (born 1957)		Teachta Dála (2016–2025)	11 November 2025	Incumbent	Independent	2025

== See also ==
- Great Seal of the Irish Free State
- History of the Republic of Ireland
- Irish head of state from 1922 to 1949
- Governor of Northern Ireland
- President of the Irish Republic
- Seal of the president of Ireland
- Secretary-General to the President (Ireland)
- Monarchy of Ireland
- President of Ireland
- Governor-General of the Irish Free State

== Sources ==
- "Constitution of Ireland". Department of the Taoiseach.
- Constitution Review Group (July 1996). "Article XII – XIV: The President" (PDF). Report. Dublin: Stationery Office. pp. 19–28. Archived from the original (PDF) on 21 July 2011.
- All-party Oireachtas Committee on the Constitution (1998). The President (PDF). Progress Reports. Vol. 3. Dublin: Stationery Office. ISBN 978-0-7076-6161-2. Archived from the original (PDF) on 21 July 2011.
