= Irish presidential election =

Election for the post of president of Ireland

The Irish presidential election determines who serves as the President of Ireland, the head of state of Ireland. The latest election was the 2025 Irish presidential election, which took place on 24 October 2025. Where only one candidate is nominated, that candidate is declared elected without a ballot; this has occurred on seven occasions.

== Procedure ==
Presidential elections are conducted in line with Article 12 of the Constitution of Ireland and under the Presidential Elections Act 1993, as amended. An election is ordinarily held not more than 60 days before the scheduled ending of the incumbent's seven-year term of office. In case of a casual vacancy (by death, resignation or removal from office) an election is held within 60 days. The dates during which candidates may be nominated and the date of the election are fixed by an order made by the Minister for Housing, Local Government and Heritage.

All Irish citizens may vote in presidential elections if they have the right to vote in elections to Dáil Éireann (the lower house of the Oireachtas or parliament). The voting age is eighteen. The Dáil electoral register is based on residency within a geographical Dáil constituency, so that those living abroad may not vote, except diplomats and military posted overseas. Resident UK citizens may vote in Dáil elections but not presidential elections. A proposed constitutional amendment would give non-resident citizens a vote in presidential elections.

Elections are conducted by means of the instant-runoff voting, which is the single-winner analogue of the single transferable vote used in other Irish elections. The constitution calls the system "proportional representation by means of the single transferable vote", although a single-seat election cannot be proportional.

To qualify, candidates must:

- be a citizen of Ireland,
- be at least 35 years of age, and
- be nominated by:
  - at least twenty members of the Houses of the Oireachtas (as of 2025, 174 TDs and 60 senators), or
  - at least four of the 31 county or city Councils, or
  - him- or herself, in the case of an incumbent or former president who has served one term.

The election order will declare the last day on which nominations may be received. If a member of the Oireachtas or a County or City council nominate more than one candidate, only the first nomination paper received from them will be deemed valid.

If there is only a single candidate they will be deemed elected without a poll. No one may serve as President for more than two terms.

== Spending limits and donations ==
The spending limits in a Presidential election were reduced in 2011. The limit is €750,000 (was €1.3 million) and the amount a candidate can be reimbursed from the State is €200,000 (was €260,000). A candidate who is elected or who receives in excess of one quarter of the quota can seek reimbursement of their expenses.

The value of donations that may be accepted by candidates, their election agents and third parties at a presidential election is governed by law. In the case of candidates and presidential election agents, the maximum donation that may be accepted from a person (or a body) in a particular year cannot exceed €2,539. In the case of a third party, the maximum donation that may be accepted cannot exceed €6,348. The acceptance of donations from non-Irish citizens residing abroad is prohibited.

== Results ==
Election	Candidate	Age	Nominated by	1st Pref.		Winner
Election	Candidate	Age	Nominated by	Votes	%	Winner
1938	Douglas Hyde	78	Oireachtas: Fianna Fáil and Fine Gael	n/a	n/a	Douglas Hyde
1945	Patrick McCartan	67	Oireachtas: Labour Party and Clann na Talmhan	212,834	19.6%	Seán T. O'Kelly
1945	Seán Mac Eoin	51	Oireachtas: Fine Gael and Independent TDs	335,539	30.9%	Seán T. O'Kelly
1945	Seán T. O'Kelly	62	Oireachtas: Fianna Fáil	537,965	49.5%	Seán T. O'Kelly
1952	Seán T. O'Kelly	69	Self-nomination	n/a	n/a	Seán T. O'Kelly
1959	Éamon de Valera	76	Oireachtas: Fianna Fáil	538,003	56.3%	Éamon de Valera
1959	Seán Mac Eoin	65	Oireachtas: Fine Gael	417,536	43.7%	Éamon de Valera
1966	Éamon de Valera	83	Oireachtas: Fianna Fáil	558,861	50.5%	Éamon de Valera
1966	Tom O'Higgins	49	Oireachtas: Fine Gael	548,144	49.5%	Éamon de Valera
1973	Erskine H. Childers	60	Oireachtas: Fianna Fáil	635,867	51.9%	Erskine H. Childers
1973	Tom O'Higgins	56	Oireachtas: Fine Gael	587,771	48.0%	Erskine H. Childers
1974	Cearbhall Ó Dálaigh	63	Oireachtas: Fianna Fáil, Fine Gael and Labour Party	n/a	n/a	Cearbhall Ó Dálaigh
1976	Patrick Hillery	53	Oireachtas: Fianna Fáil	n/a	n/a	Patrick Hillery
1983	Patrick Hillery	60	Self-nomination	n/a	n/a	Patrick Hillery
1990	Austin Currie	51	Oireachtas: Fine Gael	267,902	17.0%	Mary Robinson
1990	Brian Lenihan	59	Oireachtas: Fianna Fáil	694,484	44.1%	Mary Robinson
1990	Mary Robinson	46	Oireachtas: Labour Party and Workers' Party	612,265	38.9%	Mary Robinson
1997	Mary Banotti	58	Oireachtas: Fine Gael	372,002	29.3%	Mary McAleese
1997	Mary McAleese	46	Oireachtas: Fianna Fáil and Progressive Democrats	574,424	45.2%	Mary McAleese
1997	Derek Nally	60	County and City Councils	59,529	4.7%	Mary McAleese
1997	Adi Roche	42	Oireachtas: Labour Party, Democratic Left and Green Party	88,423	6.9%	Mary McAleese
1997	Dana Rosemary Scallon	46	County and City Councils	175,458	13.8%	Mary McAleese
2004	Mary McAleese	53	Self-nomination	n/a	n/a	Mary McAleese
2011	Mary Davis	57	County and City Councils	48,657	2.7%	Michael D. Higgins
2011	Seán Gallagher	49	County and City Councils	504,964	28.5%	Michael D. Higgins
2011	Michael D. Higgins	70	Oireachtas: Labour Party	701,101	39.6%	Michael D. Higgins
2011	Martin McGuinness	61	Oireachtas: Sinn Féin and Independent TDs	243,030	13.7%	Michael D. Higgins
2011	Gay Mitchell	59	Oireachtas: Fine Gael	113,321	6.4%	Michael D. Higgins
2011	David Norris	67	County and City Councils	109,469	6.2%	Michael D. Higgins
2011	Dana Rosemary Scallon	60	County and City Councils	51,220	2.9%	Michael D. Higgins
2018	Peter Casey	60	County and City Councils	342,727	23.3%	Michael D. Higgins
2018	Seán Gallagher	56	County and City Councils	94,514	6.4%	Michael D. Higgins
2018	Gavin Duffy	58	County and City Councils	32,198	2.2%	Michael D. Higgins
2018	Joan Freeman	60	County and City Councils	87,908	6.0%	Michael D. Higgins
2018	Michael D. Higgins	77	Self-nomination	822,566	55.8%	Michael D. Higgins
2018	Liadh Ní Riada	51	Oireachtas: Sinn Féin	93,987	6.4%	Michael D. Higgins
2025	Catherine Connolly	68	Oireachtas: Sinn Féin, Labour Party, Social Democrats, People Before Profit, Solidarity, Green Party, 100% Redress and Independent TDs	914,143	63.4%	Catherine Connolly
2025	Jim Gavin	54	Oireachtas: Fianna Fáil	103,568	7.2%	Catherine Connolly
2025	Heather Humphreys	65	Oireachtas: Fine Gael	424,987	29.5%	Catherine Connolly

== Election dates and forms of nomination ==
Table legend:
Oir = Oireachtas
CC = County or city council

Year	Ministerial Order	Close of Nominations	Nominations			Election date	Inauguration
Year	Ministerial Order	Close of Nominations	Oir.	CC	Self	Election date	Inauguration
1938	14 April	4 May	1	0	0	31 May	25 June
1945		16 May	3	0	0	14 June	25 June
1952	25 April	16 May	0	0	1	10 June	25 June
1959	27 April	19 May	2	0	0	17 June	25 June
1966	27 April	10 May	2	0	0	1 June	25 June
1973	25 April	8 May	2	0	0	30 May	25 June
1974			1	0	0	17 November	19 December
1976			1	0	0	2 October	3 December
1983	7 October	21 October	0	0	1	23 November	3 December
1990		16 October	3	0	0	7 November	3 December
1997	15 September	30 September	3	2	0	30 October	11 November
2004	13 September	1 October	0	0	1	22 October	11 November
2011	30 August	28 September	3	4	0	27 October	11 November
2018	28 August	26 September	1	4	1	26 October	11 November
2025	3 September	24 September	3	0	0	24 October	11 November

Election dates in italics indicate dates which were set in the ministerial order, but where no election was held as only one candidate had been nominated.

== See also ==
- Politics of the Republic of Ireland
- Elections in the Republic of Ireland
- Irish presidential inauguration
