= 2004 Irish presidential election =

- 22 October 2004 (Unopposed)
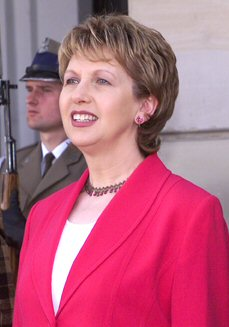
Nominee	Mary McAleese
Party	Independent
President before election
Mary McAleese
Independent
Elected President
Mary McAleese
Independent

The 2004 Irish presidential election was the twelfth presidential election held in Ireland. The poll was scheduled for Friday 22 October 2004. Nominations closed at noon on 1 October, and incumbent President Mary McAleese, who nominated herself under the provisions of the Constitution, was the only candidate nominated. Accordingly, she was re-elected for a second seven year term without the need for a poll. This was the third time a president was returned unopposed, following Seán T. O'Kelly in the 1952 election and Patrick Hillery in the 1983 election. McAleese was inaugurated for her second term on 11 November 2004.

== Background ==
Under Article 12 of the Constitution of Ireland, a candidate for president could be nominated by:

- at least twenty of the 226 serving members of the Houses of the Oireachtas;
- at least four of the 34 county or city councils;
- the candidate themselves, in the case of an incumbent or former president.

The Minister for the Environment, Heritage and Local Government made the order opening nominations on 13 September 2004. Nominations closed at noon on 1 October, with 22 October set as the date for a poll, if required.

== Potential nominees ==
=== Mary McAleese ===
Incumbent President Mary McAleese nominated herself for a second term on 24 September. She received support from the governing parties Fianna Fáil and the Progressive Democrats, which had also backed her in the 1997 presidential election. Opposition parties including Fine Gael and Sinn Féin also supported her candidacy.

=== Dana Rosemary Scallon ===
Dana Rosemary Scallon had previously contested the 1997 presidential election and served as an MEP from 1999 until her defeat in the 2004 European Parliament election. In 2004, she again sought a nomination for the presidency through local authorities, but received support only from Galway City Council. After failing to secure enough council nominations, she wrote to members of the Oireachtas seeking support for her candidacy.

Independent TD Jerry Cowley briefly supported Scallon's campaign before withdrawing his support. On the day nominations closed, Scallon questioned the President of the High Court about the nomination rules. Separately, a High Court challenge by a member of the public seeking to extend the nomination deadline to allow Scallon to be nominated was unsuccessful.

=== Labour Party ===
In early 2003, the Labour Party said it intended to run a candidate in the presidential election, even if President Mary McAleese sought a second term. Former Minister for Arts, Culture and the Gaeltacht Michael D. Higgins was among those considered as a possible nominee. However, as the 2004 European Parliament election and the 2004 local elections approached, party leader Pat Rabbitte suggested that Labour's focus had shifted toward those campaigns instead.

On 15 September 2004, Labour's parliamentary party recommended against running a candidate. Two days later, the party's National Executive voted by 13 votes to 12 not to contest the election.

=== Green Party ===
Green Party TD Eamon Ryan stated that he was interested in seeking a nomination to run. However, practical difficulties included a lack of support from non-Green Party parliamentarians (14 would have been needed in addition to the six Green Party TDs), Mary McAleese's personal popularity, and funding issues. Despite being endorsed by the party leadership, Ryan subsequently withdrew his name at a meeting of the Green Party National Council. The party ultimately did not run a candidate.

== Results ==
The only candidate nominated was Mary McAleese and she was declared elected at the close of nominations on 1 October.

2004 Irish presidential election
Candidate	Nominated by
Mary McAleese	Self-nominated
