= 1974 Irish presidential election =

- 18 December 1974 (Unopposed)
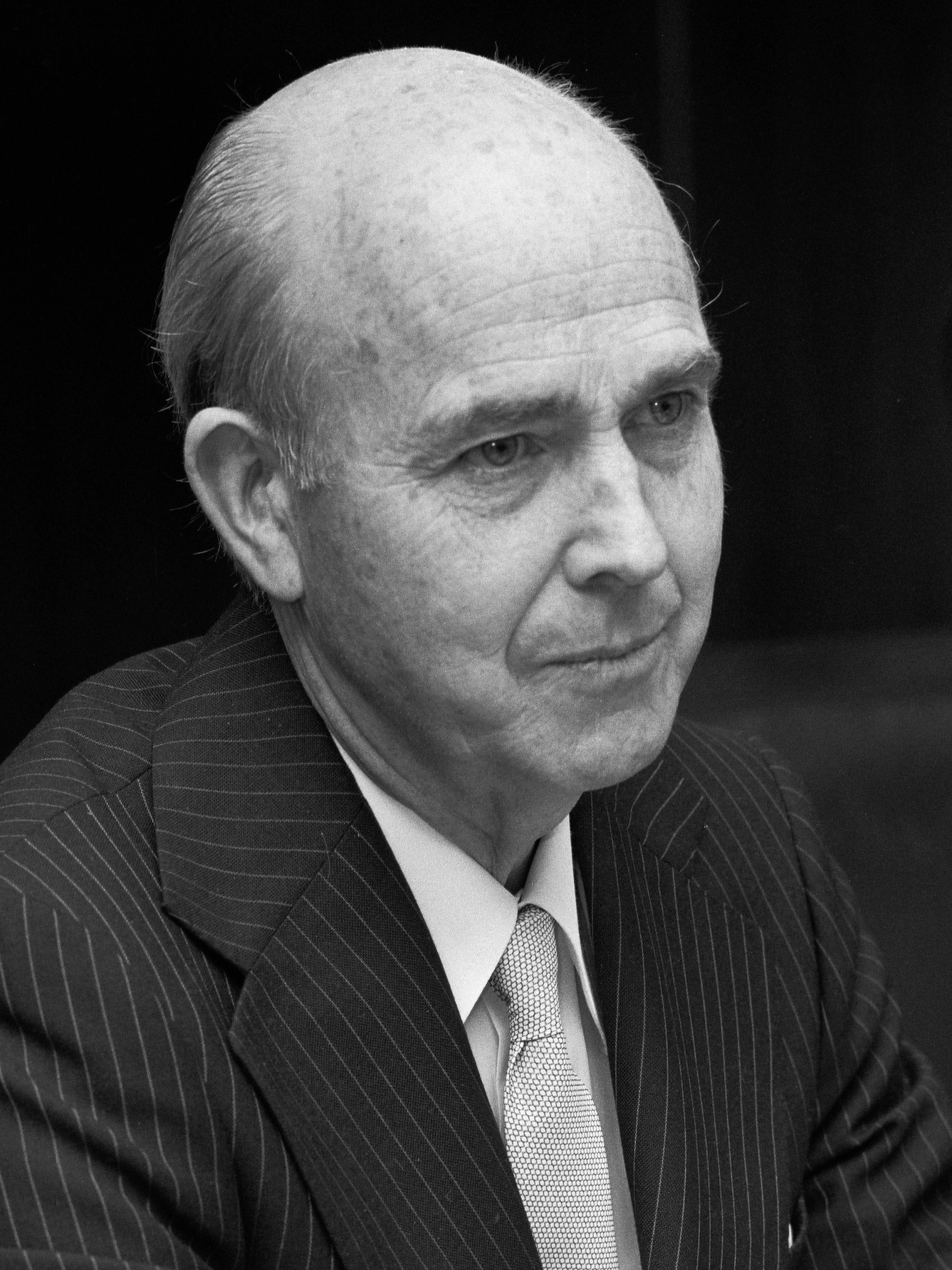
Nominee	Cearbhall Ó Dálaigh
Party	Fianna Fáil
President before election
Erskine H. Childers (deceased)
Fianna Fáil
Elected President
Cearbhall Ó Dálaigh
Independent

The 1974 Irish presidential election resulted from the sudden death in office of President Erskine H. Childers. Cearbhall Ó Dálaigh was elected unopposed as the fifth president of Ireland.

== Nomination process ==
Childers died on 17 November 1974. On 21 November, the Minister for Local Government issued a ministerial order setting 3 December as the date for close of nominations and 18 December as the date of the election.

Under Article 12 of the Constitution of Ireland, a candidate for president could be nominated by:

- at least twenty of the 204 serving members of the Houses of the Oireachtas, or
- at least four of 31 councils of the administrative counties, including county boroughs.

== Agreed candidate ==
Initially all parties privately agreed to nominate the late president's widow, Rita Childers. Before she was informed of the plan, however, a mix-up led to the collapse of the arrangement. A partially deaf Fine Gael Teachta Dála, identified in some reports as Tom O'Donnell, confirmed the secret arrangement upon mishearing a journalist's question asking about the decision of a local council's nomination of Childers as president, having assumed that the cross-party decision was made public. Fianna Fáil leader Jack Lynch, thinking the party was set up, subsequently withdrew from the agreement and nominated Cearbhall Ó Dálaigh instead. The parties agreed to the new arrangement due to a number of external factors, including a sluggish economy and The Troubles.

Ó Dálaigh had served as Attorney General from 1951 to 1953, as a judge of the Supreme Court from 1953 to 1973, as Chief Justice from 1961 to 1973, and had been serving as a judge of the European Court of Justice from 1973 at the time of his nomination. All parties agreed to Ó Dálaigh's nomination. As no other candidate was nominated, it was not necessary to proceed to a ballot for his election.

== Result ==
1974 Irish presidential election
Candidate	Nominated by
Cearbhall Ó Dálaigh	Fianna Fáil, Fine Gael and Labour Party

Ó Dálaigh was inaugurated as president on Thursday, 19 December 1974.
