= Eoin O'Mahony (politician) =

Irish barrister, local councillor, and genealogist

Eoin "the Pope" O'Mahony (22 March 1905 – 15 February 1970) was an Irish barrister, local councillor, and genealogist. He was well known as a "wit, raconteur, [and] fighter for hopeless causes".

He was born in County Cork and attended Presentation Brothers College, Cork and Clongowes Wood College. The most common story of how he gained the nickname "the Pope" is when asked at school what he wanted to be when he grew up. A skilled student debater, he was auditor of both the University College Cork Philosophical Society and the Trinity College Dublin Historical Society; his auditorial address to the former was published in a legal journal. He was a Fianna Fáil member of both Cork City Council and Cork County Council in the 1930s, breaking with the party over its internment of republicans under the Offences against the State Act 1939 during the Emergency of the Second World War. The breach curtailed his legal career as a state prosecutor and he later led a precarious life with no permanent home or income; according to John Ryan, his mailing addresses were "Main Gate, Trinity College", and "Men's Hairdresser, Shelbourne Hotel". When the young Brendan Behan was held at a borstal in Liverpool, O'Mahony sent a famous telegram that "the Pope" was coming to defend him. He was on the committee which secured the 1947 release of S-Plan prisoners.

Admired for his loquacity and genealogical knowledge, he presented a programme on Radio Éireann, was visiting professor at Southern Illinois University, and wrote a paper on John Conmee. He received the Order of Merit of the Federal Republic of Germany for his work for postwar German child refugees. He was a Knight of Malta and Man of the Trees. He tried to run in the 1966 Irish presidential election, securing one of the required four nominations, from North Tipperary County Council. He was sympathetic to elements of Irish heritage dismissed by many at the time as West British, honouring the memory of those who fought in the First World War and supporting the Irish Georgian Society. He proposed a united Ireland as a monarchy under Viscount Gormanston (highest-precedence Catholic in the Peerage of Ireland) or the O'Conor Don (heir of Ruaidrí Ua Conchobair, last pre-Norman High King).

A portly man, O'Mahony died unexpectedly of a heart attack. After his death, the National Gallery of Ireland purchased a portrait of him. Harry Kernoff also painted him. Friends established a bursary in his memory for study of the Irish diaspora, which was administered by the Royal Irish Academy until 2017.
