= 1966 Irish presidential election =

- 1 June 1966
- Turnout: 65.4% (▲7.1 pp)
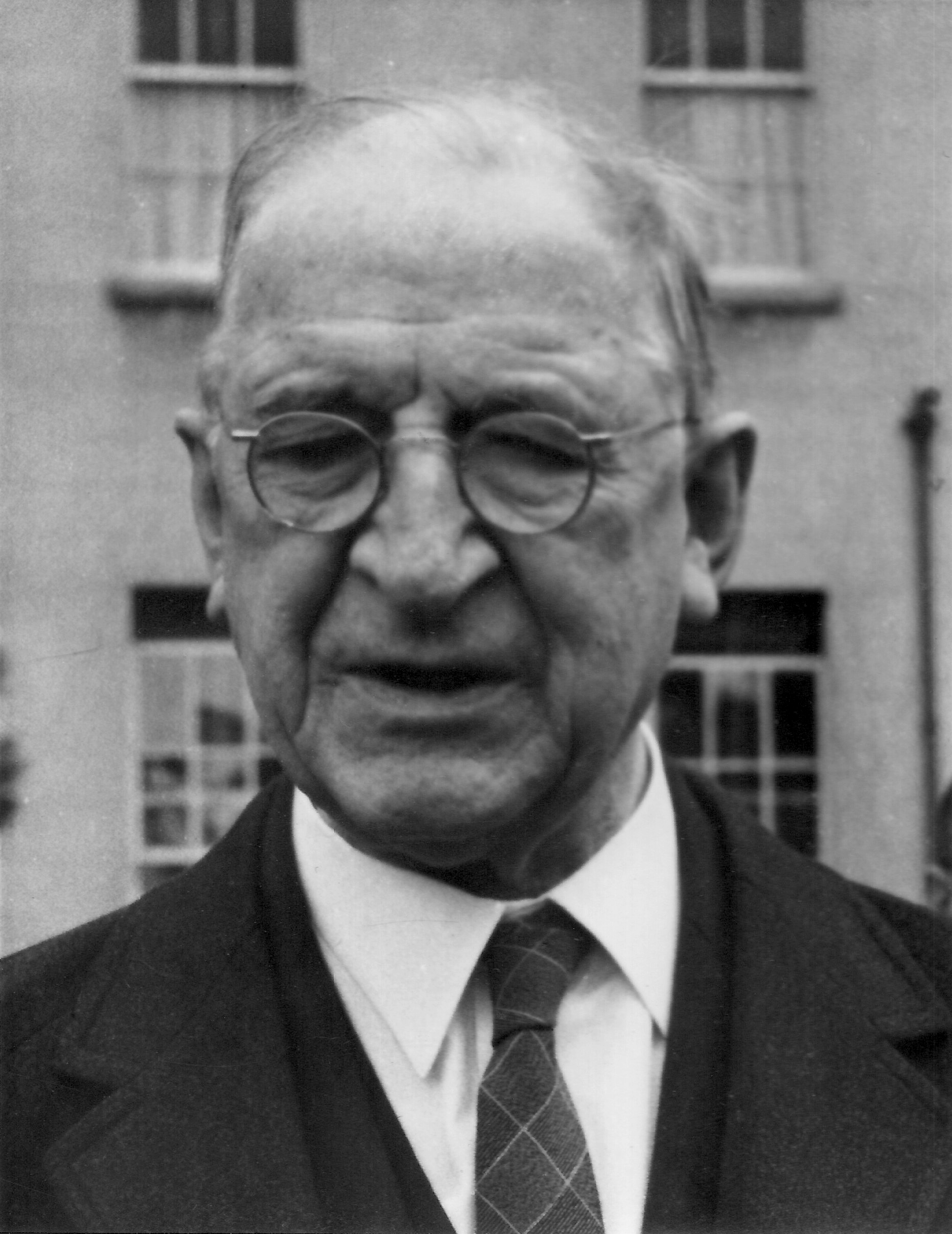

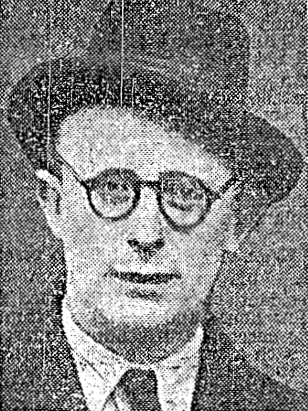
Nominee	Éamon de Valera	Tom O'Higgins
Party	Fianna Fáil	Fine Gael
1st preference	558,861 (50.5%)	548,144 (49.5%)
President before election
Éamon de Valera
Fianna Fáil
Elected President
Éamon de Valera
Fianna Fáil

The 1966 Irish presidential election was held on Wednesday, 1 June 1966. It was contested between the incumbent president Éamon de Valera, representing Fianna Fáil, and Tom O'Higgins of Fine Gael. De Valera, one of the most prominent figures in 20th-century Irish politics and figurehead of Ireland's old guard, sought a second term at the age of 83, while O'Higgins represented a younger generation seeking political change. The election was notable for its extremely narrow outcome, with de Valera winning by a slim margin of just 10,717 votes (50.5% to 49.5%). The election held symbolic significance, occurring not only on the 50th anniversary of the 1916 Easter Rising (an event in which de Valera had been a prominent leader) but also in the wake of the 1960 United States presidential election, where the young, charismatic Irish-American Catholic John F. Kennedy was the victor. Both events influenced the election and helped shape the narrative that the election was a battle between Ireland's different generations.

== Nomination process ==
Under Article 12 of the Constitution of Ireland, a candidate for president may be nominated by:

- at least twenty of the 204 serving members of the Houses of the Oireachtas, or
- at least four of 31 councils of the administrative counties, including county boroughs, or
- themselves, in the case of a former or retiring president.

On 27 April, the Minister for Local Government made the order for the presidential election, with noon on 10 May as the date for nominations, and 1 June as the date of polling.

=== Fianna Fáil ===
As president, Éamon de Valera had the right to nominate himself for a second term, but he chose to be nominated by Fianna Fáil, the party he had led from 1926 until his election in 1959. Then Fianna Fáil leader and Taoiseach Seán Lemass had urged de Valera not to retire, as he had been considering. De Valera's campaign manager was Charles Haughey, later to become Fianna Fáil leader and Taoiseach.

=== Fine Gael ===
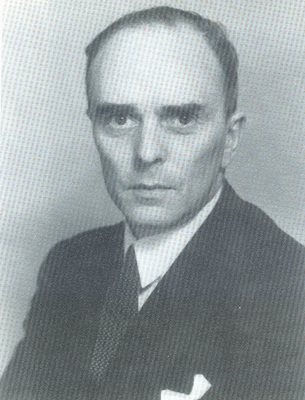
Seán MacBride

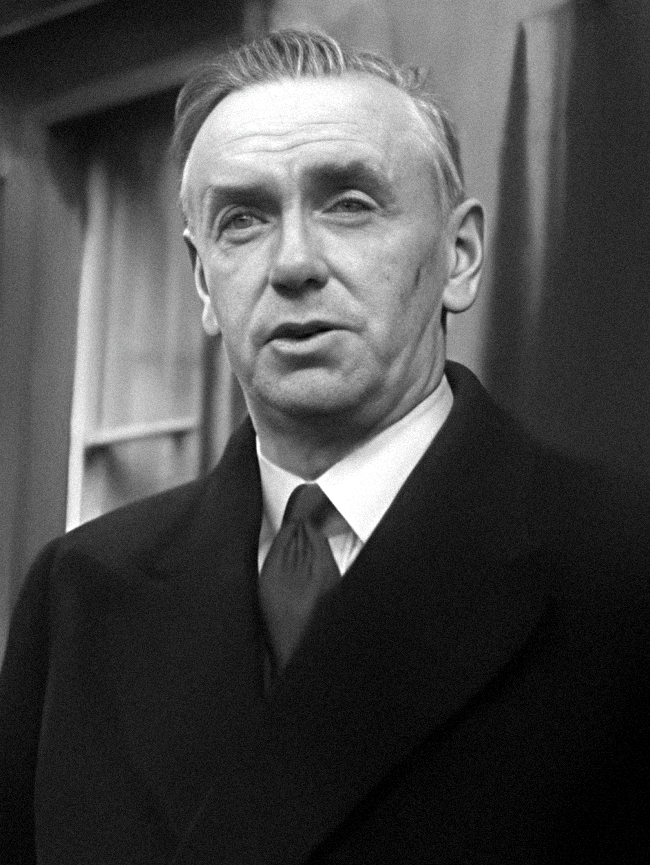
John A. Costello

Before the election, O'Higgins unsuccessfully proposed that Fine Gael nominate Seán MacBride to challenge the incumbent, Éamon de Valera. MacBride was not a member of Fine Gael but had worked with the party during the 1950s, serving as Minister for External Affairs in the Inter-Party Government led by Fine Gael's John A. Costello. MacBride's involvement with Fine Gael had been strategic, allowing him to advance his policy agenda while maintaining his independence from the party's core ideology. MacBride's background was firmly rooted in Irish republicanism: he was a prominent figure in the Irish Republican Army (IRA) during the 1920s and the son of Maud Gonne and John MacBride, both influential figures in the independence movement. This background gave him significant republican credentials, which some in Fine Gael saw as an asset for countering Éamon de Valera's own republican legacy. By suggesting MacBride as a candidate, O’Higgins and others within Fine Gael aimed to present a challenger who could contend with de Valera on Irish nationalism. However, the idea of Fine Gael running a republican was inherently a fundamentally contentious one, and was rejected.

After the MacBride suggestion was declined, O'Higgins encouraged former Taoiseach John A. Costello to enter the race before ultimately being persuaded to stand as Fine Gael's candidate himself. Gerard Sweetman served as his election director.

Although O'Higgins was seen as a young liberal, his family background was steeped in Fine Gael tradition and conservativism. His father Thomas F. O'Higgins, his brother Michael, his sister-in-law Brigid Hogan-O'Higgins, and his uncle Kevin had all been elected to the Dáil for Fine Gael or its predecessor Cumann na nGaedheal. Both his father and uncle had also served as cabinet ministers. Additionally, one of his great-grandfathers, Timothy Daniel Sullivan, was a Fenian poet and nationalist.

=== Independent bids ===
Independent broadcaster and genealogist Eoin "the Pope" O'Mahony, who had sought and failed to be nominated in 1959, tried again, unsuccessfully. He wrote to local authorities and was allowed to address eleven. He fell short of the requisite four nominations: only North Tipperary County Council voted in his favour, and later reversed the decision; Wicklow County Council fell one vote short.

== Campaign ==
=== RTÉ decision not to cover campaign ===
O'Higgins' campaign was met with immediate difficulty when, at the outset, de Valera declared that he would not conduct a campaign himself, believing that the office of President should be above party politics. In response, Ireland's national radio and television broadcaster RTÉ decided it could not (or would not), cover O'Higgins campaigning as this would be unbalanced in their view. Fine Gael leader Liam Cosgrove responded by arguing that this was unjust, as although de Valera was not formally campaigning, he regularly appeared on RTÉ radio and television in his capacity as president. RTÉ, however, did not change its position.

=== John F. Kennedy-influenced O'Higgins campaign ===
O'Higgins carried out a grassroots campaign that saw him attend over 130 public meetings across the Republic of Ireland, covering an estimated 22,000 miles around the country over five weeks, reportedly attending as many as three rallies a night. Fine Gael presented O'Higgins and his wife Terry as Irish analogues of John F. Kennedy and his wife Jackie Kennedy, emphasising their comparative youth to the elderly de Valera. Campaign ads for O'Higgins prominently featured images of him surrounded by Terry and their seven children in shots designed to evoke the spirit of Camelot that had earned the Kennedys much popularity earlier in the decade. The general thrust of the campaign was that O'Higgins represented the future in contrast to the nostalgia of de Valera. Campaign manager Gerald Sweetman described the campaign as expressing "the need for a youthful, forward looking president to personify the real Ireland and what it can best contribute to modern civilisation".

An example of O'Higgins' attempt to emulate modern American politics was seen on 28 May 1966, when a light aircraft dropped balloons bearing campaign slogans onto the city of Limerick during an O'Higgins motorcade procession. Observing these new tactics, the journalist John Healy of The Irish Times observed "The Fine Gael tail is up. It is running as it has not run for a long time. It will be an interesting finish indeed".

=== De Valera response ===
Polling was not yet a feature of Irish politics in 1966; instead parties still generally relied on their constituency branches to provide a sense of grassroots sentiment. When Fianna Fáil received feedback from their branches about the O'Higgins campaign, they became highly concerned. Although de Valera remained officially committed to not campaigning, he began to make several public appearances on the pretence of commemorating 1916. De Valera's campaign manager was then Minister for Agriculture and future leader of Fianna Fáil Charles Haughey. Responding to the momentum of the O'Higgins campaign, Haughey announced £5.5 million in spending targeted at farmers just five days before voting began. Fianna Fáil leader and de Valera protege Sean Lemass declared that a de Valera victory would be "an affirmation by the people that the aims for our country which have directed him throughout his life remain constant, and that patriotism is as relevant in the island of 1966 as it was in 1916".

== Result ==
Candidate	Nominated by	Votes	%
Éamon de Valera	Oireachtas: Fianna Fáil	558,861	50.48
Tom O'Higgins	Oireachtas: Fine Gael	548,144	49.52
Total		1,107,005	100.00
Valid votes		1,107,005	99.11
Invalid/blank votes		9,910	0.89
Total votes		1,116,915	100.00
Registered voters/turnout		1,709,161	65.35

=== Results by constituency ===
Constituency	De Valera		O'Higgins	
Constituency	Votes	%	Votes	%
Carlow–Kilkenny	21,332	53.3	18,725	46.7
Cavan	12,542	50.2	12,431	49.8
Clare	19,992	64.2	11,132	35.8
Cork Borough	18,129	48.5	19,281	51.5
Cork Mid	17,532	48.0	19,015	52.0
Cork North-East	21,204	51.2	20,175	48.8
Cork South-West	11,590	46.9	13,131	53.1
Donegal North-East	13,540	60.2	8,967	39.8
Donegal South-West	12,781	54.2	10,804	45.8
Dublin County	9,842	45.0	12,016	55.0
Dublin North-Central	20,300	41.4	28,676	58.6
Dublin North-East	10,202	42.2	13,995	57.8
Dublin North-West	13,954	44.9	17,149	55.1
Dublin South-Central	10,554	40.0	15,841	60.0
Dublin South-East	14,764	42.8	19,692	57.2
Dublin South-West	19,656	44.5	24,554	55.5
Dún Laoghaire and Rathdown	13,869	37.7	22,945	62.3
Galway East	20,621	56.4	15,951	43.6
Galway West	11,793	60.6	7,674	39.4
Kerry North	11,334	55.7	9,016	44.3
Kerry South	11,083	55.9	8,759	44.1
Kildare	16,022	52.1	14,705	47.9
Laois–Offaly	19,046	48.7	20,075	51.3
Limerick East	17,002	53.4	14,822	46.6
Limerick West	13,719	57.2	10,262	42.8
Longford–Westmeath	14,951	50.4	14,740	49.6
Louth	13,519	54.0	11,523	46.0
Mayo North	9,878	55.0	8,096	45.0
Mayo South	12,598	48.9	13,161	51.1
Meath	13,368	57.5	9,891	42.5
Monaghan	11,700	50.6	11,408	49.4
Roscommon	15,655	51.7	14,646	48.3
Sligo–Leitrim	13,251	50.6	12,918	49.4
Tipperary North	12,589	55.2	10,209	44.8
Tipperary South	19,300	58.4	13,745	41.6
Waterford	13,334	55.0	10,913	45.0
Wexford	15,268	50.1	15,203	49.9
Wicklow	11,047	48.1	11,898	51.9
Total	558,861	50.5	548,144	49.5

== Aftermath ==
The President expressed his satisfaction at securing victory in his final election, remarking, "even though it was only by a short head," and explained his decision not to nominate himself. He emphasised that doing so would have been disingenuous, as no one could realistically expect to win the presidency without the support of a political party or organisation. Seán Lemass interpreted the result as a "tribute to a man who had rendered exceptional national service" and a clear indication of the people's confidence in his ability to carry out the presidential duties in a manner that would reflect positively on the nation.

In his autobiography, A Double Life, O'Higgins reflected decades later on his performance in the 1966 presidential race: He believed he had conducted himself honourably and maintained his integrity throughout the contest. He wrote that the election was "a close-run thing", invoking the words used by the Duke of Wellington to describe his victory at Waterloo. His vote remains the highest election result a Fine Gael candidate has received in an Irish presidential election.
