= 1959 Irish presidential election =

- 17 June 1959
- Turnout: 58.3% (▼4.7 pp) (Note: Based on the last contested election in 1945)
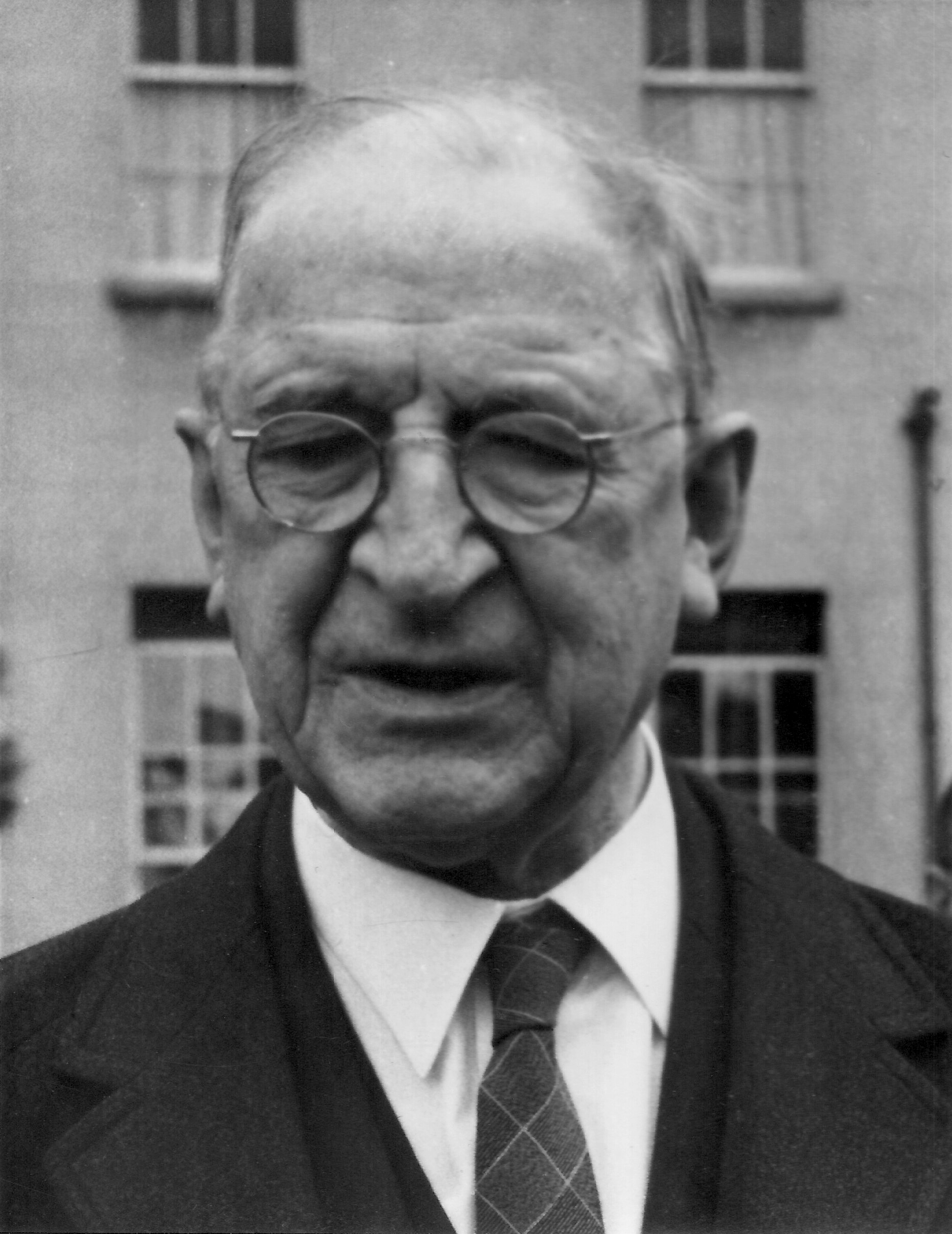

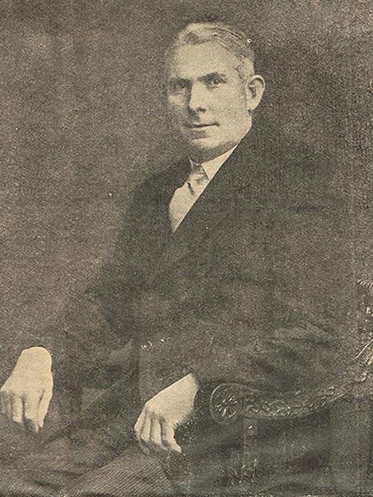
Nominee	Éamon de Valera	Seán Mac Eoin
Party	Fianna Fáil	Fine Gael
1st preference	538,003 (56.3%)	417,536 (43.7%)
President before election
Seán T. O'Kelly
Fianna Fáil
Elected President
Éamon de Valera
Fianna Fáil

The 1959 Irish presidential election was held on Wednesday, 17 June 1959. Éamon de Valera, then Taoiseach, was elected as president of Ireland. A referendum proposed by de Valera to replace the electoral system of proportional representation by means of the single transferable vote with first-past-the-post voting which was held on the same day was defeated by 48.2% to 51.8%.

== Nomination process ==
Under Article 12 of the Constitution of Ireland, a candidate for president may be nominated by:

- at least twenty of the 207 serving members of the Houses of the Oireachtas, or
- at least four of 31 councils of the administrative counties, including county boroughs, or
- themselves, in the case of a former or retiring president.

Outgoing president Seán T. O'Kelly had served two terms and was ineligible to serve again. On 27 April, the Minister for Local Government signed the ministerial order opening nominations, with noon on 19 May as the deadline for nominations, and 17 June set as the date for a contest. All Irish citizens on the Dáil electoral register were eligible to vote.

Éamon de Valera, who had served as President of Dáil Éireann and President of the Irish Republic from 1919 to 1922 during the Irish revolutionary period, as President of the Executive Council from 1932 to 1937, and as Taoiseach from 1937 to 1948, from 1951 to 1954, and was serving again from 1957, was nominated by Fianna Fáil on 12 May. He had served as Fianna Fáil's leader since its foundation in 1926. Later reports revealed that de Valera requested Oscar Traynor, the Minister for Justice, to issue him with a certificate of citizenship, as he had been born in the United States. This was kept confidential.

Seán Mac Eoin, a Fine Gael TD who had been the party's candidate in the 1945 presidential election, was nominated again by the party on 15 May.

During the campaign, the far-right micro-party Lia Fáil called on its followers to support Seán Mac Eoin over de Valera. The party gave 25 reasons for this position, with some of those reasons being that de Valera "was an alien" (de Valera had been born in the United States, but had been raised and living in Ireland since the age of 2), was a puppet of the British, that he was "the darling" of Protestants, Freemasons and the British Army, and that "his satanic lust for power motivates every act of his life". The paper's reasons for supporting Mac Eoin were that he was "an honest-to-God Irishman of our flesh and blood whose father and mother we know" and that he had a military background.

Patrick McCartan, who had also been a candidate in the 1945 election and had served as a senator for Clann na Poblachta from 1948 to 1951, was nominated by two county councils only, short of the four required for nomination. Eoin O'Mahony, the eccentric former Fianna Fáil county councillor in Cork, also sought and failed to secure a nomination by county councils.

Éamon de Valera was inaugurated as president on 25 June.

== Result ==
Candidate	Nominated by	Votes	%
Éamon de Valera	Oireachtas: Fianna Fáil	538,003	56.30
Seán Mac Eoin	Oireachtas: Fine Gael	417,536	43.70
Total		955,539	100.00
Valid votes		955,539	97.54
Invalid/blank votes		24,089	2.46
Total votes		979,628	100.00
Registered voters/turnout		1,678,450	58.37

=== Results by constituency ===
Constituency	De Valera		Mac Eoin	
Constituency	Votes	%	Votes	%
Carlow–Kilkenny	20,023	58.0	14,521	42.0
Cavan	13,912	56.6	10,669	43.4
Clare	19,095	65.0	10,270	35.0
Cork Borough	19,390	55.8	15,340	44.2
Cork East	12,117	56.6	9,295	43.4
Cork North	12,754	54.2	10,793	45.8
Cork South	11,909	53.5	10,367	46.5
Cork West	10,235	48.5	10,861	51.5
Donegal East	15,521	69.1	6,934	30.9
Donegal West	9,616	62.8	5,700	37.2
Dublin County	19,449	52.9	17,292	47.1
Dublin North-East	6,133	47.9	6,682	52.1
Dublin North-Central	16,417	48.5	17,446	51.5
Dublin North-West	7,707	46.3	8,941	53.7
Dublin South-Central	11,819	49.6	12,010	50.4
Dublin South-East	10,363	50.8	10,034	49.2
Dublin South-West	16,195	51.0	15,551	49.0
Dún Laoghaire and Rathdown	16,911	53.0	14,982	47.0
Galway North	9,037	62.7	5,368	37.3
Galway South	11,710	66.6	5,868	33.4
Galway West	10,134	69.0	4,548	31.0
Kerry North	12,361	61.7	7,680	38.3
Kerry South	7,472	57.7	5,481	42.3
Kildare	10,794	52.4	9,791	47.6
Laois–Offaly	20,059	58.8	14,045	41.2
Limerick East	15,942	59.2	11,007	40.8
Limerick West	12,918	62.4	7,799	37.6
Longford–Westmeath	16,234	48.1	17,534	51.9
Louth	13,646	55.2	11,076	44.8
Mayo North	9,219	62.0	5,651	38.0
Mayo South	12,925	55.1	10,538	44.9
Meath	13,940	58.9	9,710	41.1
Monaghan	11,028	60.0	7,361	40.0
Roscommon	12,188	53.5	10,599	46.5
Sligo–Leitrim	16,081	52.7	14,449	47.3
Tipperary North	12,253	60.2	8,104	39.8
Tipperary South	16,568	58.2	11,900	41.8
Waterford	15,679	61.7	9,715	38.3
Wexford	17,290	55.9	13,667	44.1
Wicklow	10,959	57.9	7,957	42.1
Total	538,003	56.3	417,536	43.7
