= 1990 Irish presidential election =

- 7 November 1990
- Turnout: 64.1% (▲1.9 pp) (Note: Based on the last contested election in 1973)
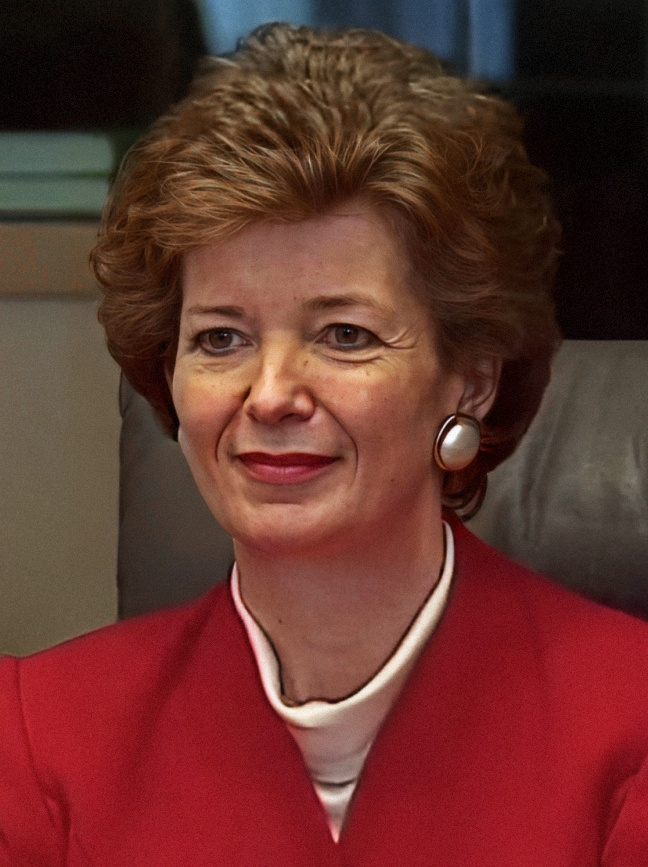

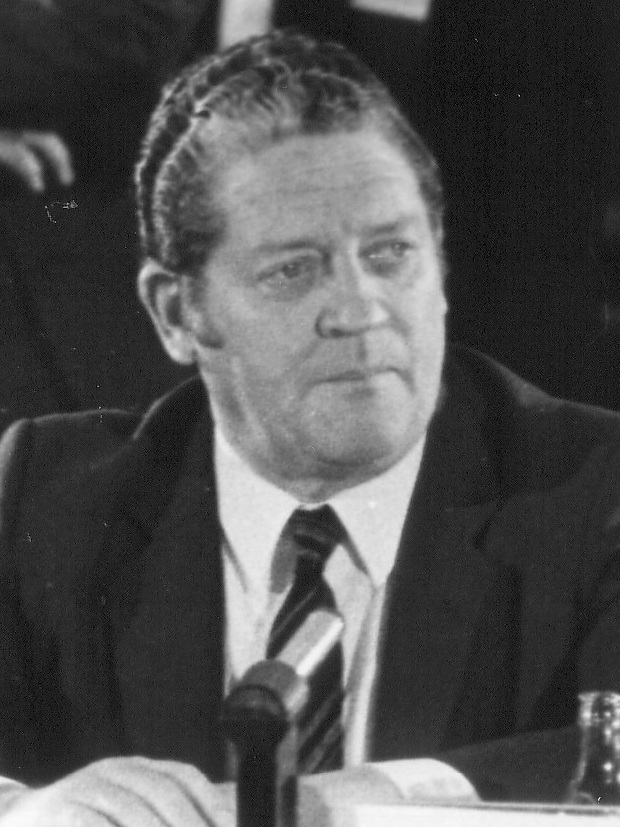

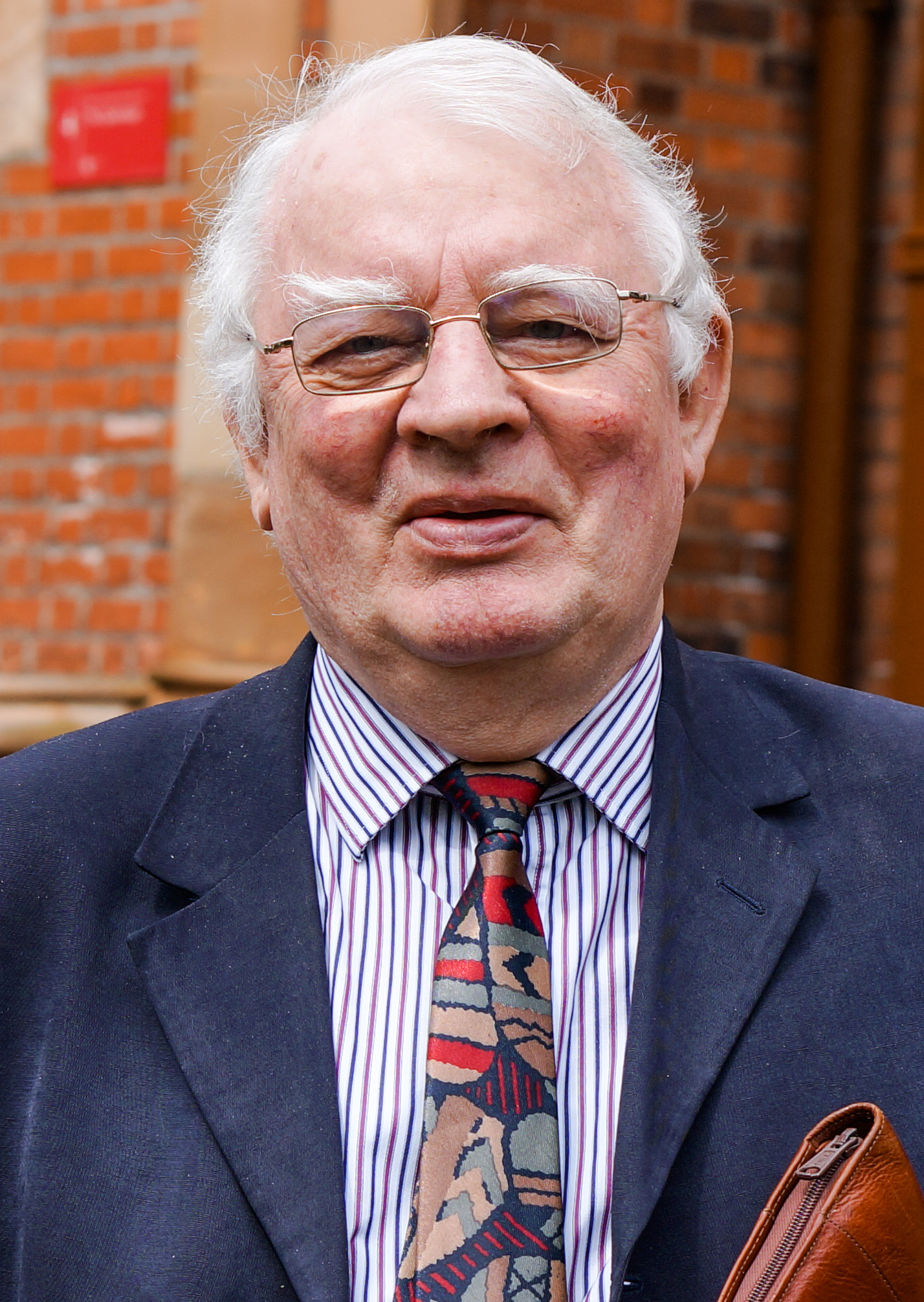
| Nominee | Mary Robinson | Brian Lenihan | Austin Currie |
| Party | Labour | Fianna Fáil | Fine Gael |
| Alliance | Workers' Party (Note: The Workers' Party helped nominate Robinson.); Green Party (Note: Although the Green Party did not nominate Robinson, following a balloting of their membership on 11 October, they provided her with their support.) |
| 1st preference | 612,265; 38.9% | 694,484; 44.1% | 267,902; 17.0% |
| Final count | 817,830; 51.9% | 731,273; 46.5% | Eliminated |
President before election
Patrick Hillery
Fianna Fáil
Elected President
Mary Robinson
Labour

The 1990 Irish presidential election was the tenth presidential election to be held in Ireland, the fifth to be contested by more than one candidate, and the first to have a female candidate and winner. It was held on Wednesday 7 November 1990, and was won by Mary Robinson on a joint Labour Party and Workers' Party ticket. The election was the first time in history a Fianna Fáil candidate failed to win the presidency. It was also the first time the Labour Party had contested a presidential election. The final leg of the campaign was characterised by intense internal turmoil within the Fianna Fáil party as well as personal attacks on the candidates from competing political parties. The election was considered a political failure for the Fine Gael party and would cause its leader, Alan Dukes, to resign in the immediate aftermath.

One of the central issues during the campaign was whether the role of the President should be expanded or not, with Robinson and Currie arguing it should while Lenihan argued against it. In the years following Robinson's election, she would transform the position into a much more visible and influential position in Irish politics.

== Nomination procedure ==
Under Article 12 of the Constitution of Ireland, a candidate for president could be nominated by:

- at least twenty of the 226 serving members of the Houses of the Oireachtas, or
- at least four of 31 county councils or county boroughs, or
- a former or retiring president, on their own nomination.

The outgoing president, Patrick Hillery, had served the maximum of two terms, and no other former president was living.

The deadline for nominations was 16 October 1990.

== Nomination campaigns ==
=== Labour and the Workers' Party ===
In January 1990, Labour leader Dick Spring stated his belief that the Labour Party needed to run a serious candidate in the election and that if no other candidate could be found, he himself would run.

The first viable candidate Labour sought was Mary Robinson; with her background in both the Seanad and her legal work, both of which saw her fighting for causes such as women's and minority rights, Robinson seemed to have excellent credentials for the role of President. However, a major stumbling block towards recruiting Robinson was her reluctance to rejoin/reaffiliate with the Labour Party. (Note: Robinson had left the Labour Party in 1985. Officially, she cited the exclusion of Ulster Unionists from the drafting of the Anglo-Irish Agreement by the Fine Gael-Labour coalition government as the reason, but in the words of her biographer John Horgan, "some commentators have found it fashionable to explain her decision solely in terms of personal pique" because Robinson was hurt that Dick Spring choose to select John Rodgers as Attorney General of Ireland over her that same year. However, Horgan continues: "It was undoubtedly a major disappointment and added to the doubts she was experiencing at that time. On the other hand, a year is a long time to bear a grudge of that kind before acting on it, and those who know Mary Robinson well would give little credence to the idea that she would behave in this way.") This delay in the recruitment of Robinson allowed for a second contender to emerge in the Labour camp: Noël Browne.

Noël Browne was a politician who had first emerged into Irish politics as a member of Clann na Poblachta and a Minister for Health in his first term as a TD as part of the first inter-party government of 1948. Browne was initially lauded for his successful crusade against tuberculous in Ireland, but his plan to introduce the Mother and Child Scheme was a major component in bringing down the government. From that time on, Browne was a persistent figure in Irish national politics but frequently found himself unable to integrate himself into party politics. After moving through a number of parties in the 1950s and 1960s, Browne was part of Labour for 14 years between 1963 and 1977. He left the party in a dispute over forming a formal electoral alliance with Fine Gael.

Spring's announcement in January had piqued Browne's interest and that of his supporters (which included Labour members such as Michael D. Higgins and Emmet Stagg). They quickly moved to explore options for how Browne could stand in elections, which led to Browne having an inconclusive meeting with the Workers' Party at the end of January. Browne's manoeuvring caught the attention of the Irish news media, who began to openly speculate about the prospect of a Browne candidacy, almost to the exclusion of Robinson. On 26 March, Browne was able to secure the endorsement of the Labour Women's National Council, a sub-organisation within the Labour Party with former ties to Robinson.

However, the Spring–Robinson talks continued to progress in parallel to Browne's movements, and on 4 April, Spring held a meeting of the Parliamentary Labour Party to discuss each candidate. A vote proposing Noel Browne as Labour's candidate was defeated by a 4 to 1 ratio, while a subsequent vote proposing Robinson succeeded.

Browne was bitterly disappointed to not receive the nomination and would for the remainder of his life hold a caustic view of Robinson. Nevertheless, it has been suggested that many of his supporters transferred their allegiance to Robinson once she became Labour's nominee and that they were a key component in her campaign.

Although Robinson had secured the Labour Party's nomination, she was not yet eligible to contest the election as the Labour Party, with 15 TDs and 4 senators, was short of the support of 20 members of the Oireachtas was required to enter the race. In order to secure the final signatures required, the Labour Party worked together with the Workers' Party, who had 7 TDs.

By May 1990, Robinson was the formal joint Labour and Workers' Party nominee, and the first candidate to enter the race.

=== Fine Gael ===
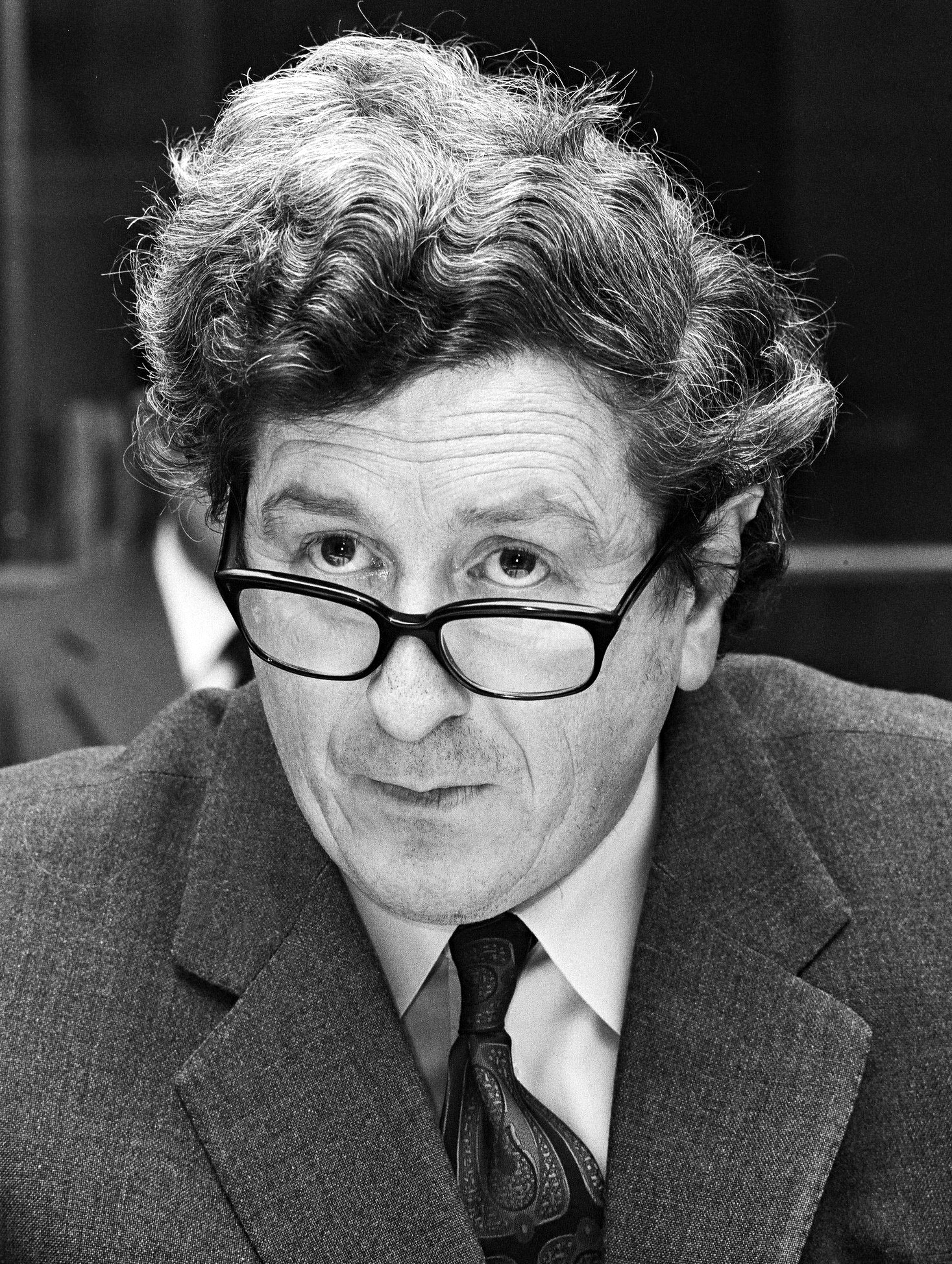
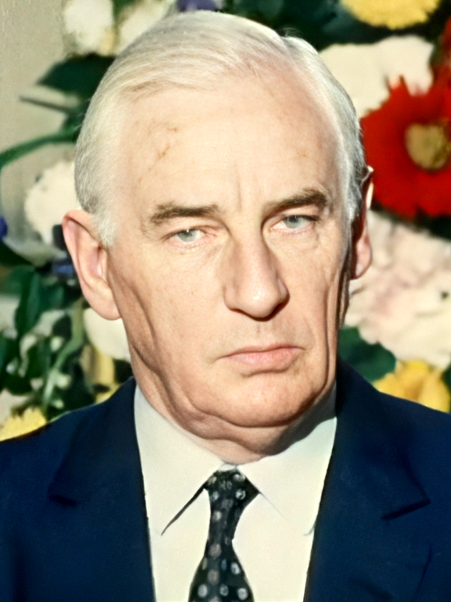
Garret FitzGerald and Peter Barry were both approached by Alan Dukes to run on behalf of Fine Gael, but declined.

At the 1990 Fine Gael Ard Fheis, party leader Alan Dukes promised that he would find a "candidate of vigour and stature" to contest the election. However, Dukes had great difficulty in trying to secure a candidate from his party's ranks, primarily due to their perception that Fianna Fáil's Brian Lenihan would be a runaway favourite to win. Dukes attempted to secure the candidacies of former Taoiseach Garret FitzGerald and former Tánaiste Peter Barry but failed.

With his options dwindling, Dukes turned to the newly elected TD Austin Currie. Currie had entered the Dáil for the first time 15 months previously following the 1989 general election. However, Currie had an extensive background as a political activist in Northern Ireland as part of the civil rights movement in Northern Ireland and as a former member of the Social Democratic and Labour Party.

After Dukes convinced Currie to stand, Currie's nomination was confirmed by a unanimous vote of Fine Gael's parliamentary party on 12 September. By that point, it was already well known to the public that Brian Lenihan would be frontrunner for the Fianna Fáil nomination.

=== Fianna Fáil ===
On 17 September 1990, Fianna Fáil selected their candidate by holding a vote amongst members of their parliamentary party. Two members put their names forward: Brian Lenihan Snr, the Tánaiste and Minister for Defence and John Wilson, Minister for the Marine. Lenihan won the vote 51 to 19.

=== Failed Independent bid by Carmencita Hederman ===
On 15 October (the day before the nomination deadline) recently elected Senator and former Lord Mayor of Dublin Carmencita Hederman asked Dublin City Council to support her and to give her a nomination towards the presidency. However, the motion was defeated by 31 votes to 5. Councillors from Fianna Fáil, Fine Gael, the Progressive Democrats and the Workers' Party cited that they could not support her bid, as their parties had already given their support to other candidates or ruled themselves neutral. Hederman's bid was supported by Independent TDs such as Tony Gregory and Seán Dublin Bay Rockall Loftus as well Green TD Roger Garland. Hederman did not petition any additional councils following her failure to secure a nomination from Dublin City Council.

Hederman asserted on 15 October that the Progressive Democrats had promised to support her bid contingent on her securing 20,000 signatures of public support, but pulled their pledge at the last moment. Mary Harney denied this, and stated she had told Hederman her support was contingent on Hederman securing the backing of 11 other TDs. Ultimately, the Progressive Democrats declared "neutrality" in the election, and did not officially support any candidate.

== Campaign and issues ==
When Lenihan entered the race in mid-September, he was considered the odds-on favourite; no Fianna Fáil candidate had ever lost a presidential election.

=== Role of the President ===
Immediately upon his selection as the Fianna Fáil candidate on 17 September, Lenihan stated that he felt that expanding the role of the President was "not an issue in this campaign" and suggested it was not possible for any candidate to, by themselves, expand the role. Lenihan's comments were in response to previous comments by both Robinson and Currie suggesting they could and would develop the presidency into a more active role in Irish politics. From as early as April 1990, Robinson made clear her ambitions to expand the role of the presidency.

=== Broad party support for Robinson ===
On October 11, the Green Party announced that it had held a ballot of its members and they had overwhelmingly voted to officially support Robinson's campaign bid. Robinson welcomed the announcement and stated her belief that environmentalism was an area in which the office of President could provide leadership.

In addition to enjoying the formal support of three separate political parties and their canvassers, many Fine Gael canvassers choose to provide support for Robinson over Currie. Polling carried out by The Irish Times by 16 October showed that half of those who considered themselves Fine Gael supporters favoured Robinson over Currie. Following the end of the campaign, Currie would cite the fact that many Fine Gael activists choose to support Robinson over himself as damaging his own campaign.

Furthermore, although their party was officially "neutral", many Progressive Democrats activists were broadly sympathetic to Robinson's social views and were also attracted to offering her support. This support intensified following Michael McDowell's robust defence of Robinson in the face of personal attacks by Fianna Fáil's Padraig Flynn (See Flynn personal remarks about Robinson below for more).

=== "Red Scare" tactics ===
The early and strong support amongst Fine Gael voters for Robinson alarmed the Fine Gael camp, who reacted by engaging in Red Scare tactics against Robinson rather than focusing on the favourite Lenihan. Immediately upon the confirmation that Currie was in the race, prominent members of Fine Gael, such as Jim Mitchell and Michael Noonan, suggested that Robinson would be the "acceptable face of Socialism in Ireland" and that a victory for Robinson would be a victory for the Workers' Party.

Members of Fianna Fáil would repeat similar accusations as the polls tightened and it became apparent that Robinson was a credible threat to Lenihan's campaign.

=== Robinson Hot Press interview ===
In September 1990, the magazine Hot Press conducted a 90-minute interview with Robinson. The audio was recorded and certain portions were later transcribed in order to be used in print. Two weeks passed between the actual interview and its eventual appearance in the October edition of the monthly magazine. Upon the release of the interview, the Fianna Fáil affiliated newspaper The Irish Press lead that day with a front-page headline reading "LONGEST SUICIDE NOTE IN HISTORY" and an article by Emily O’Reilly focusing on Robinson responding "Yes" when asked in the interview if she would, as president, officiate the opening of a stall selling contraceptives in a Virgin Megastore. (Note: In 1990 Virgin Megastores in Ireland were openly selling condoms in defiance of Irish law.) Both Lenihan and Currie accused Robinson of making a political gaffe with this response. The Robinson camp initially claimed Robinson had been misquoted, but when Liam Fay, the journalist for Hot Press, was able to produce the audio recording of the interview, his transcription was proven correct. The Robinson camp changed tack, and claimed that Robinson had not meant "Yes, I would", but simply that because of her legal background, she was in the habit of advancing dialogue by saying "Yes" as an interjection. Robinson would henceforth deny that she would preside over any illegal activity should she win the election.

=== The Lenihan tape ===
Although Lenihan was the initial favourite to win the election, his campaign was derailed when he confirmed in an on-the-record interview with freelance journalist and academic researcher Jim Duffy that he had been involved in controversial attempts to pressure President Patrick Hillery not to dissolve the Dáil in 1982. After the contrast between his public denials during the campaign and his eventual confirmation of his role during his earlier interview recorded in May the Progressive Democrats, then in coalition with Fianna Fáil, threatened to support an opposition motion of no confidence unless Lenihan was dismissed from the government or an inquiry into the 1982 events was established. The incident caused Lenihan's support to drop from 43% to 32% with Robinson going from 38% to 51%. Taoiseach Charles Haughey privately asked Lenihan to resign, and sacked him on 31 October—a week before the election—when he refused to do so leading to a sympathy vote for Lenihan; his support in the polls going from 32% on 29 October to 42% on 3 November (with Robinson's support dropping from 51 to 42%).

=== Flynn's personal remarks about Robinson ===
"She was pretty well constructed for this campaign by her handlers in the Labour Party and the Workers' Party. Of course, it doesn't always suit if you get labelled a socialist, because that's a very narrow focus in this country, so she has to try and have it both ways. She has to have new clothes and her new look and her new hairdo and she has the new interest in her family, being a mother, all that kind of thing. But none of us, you know, none of us who knew Mary Robinson very well in previous incarnations ever heard her claiming to be a great wife and mother. Mary Robinson reconstructs herself to fit the fashion of the time, so we have this thing that you can be substituted at will, whether it's the pro-socialist thing, or pro-contraception, or pro-abortion, whatever it is. But at least we should know. Mary Robinson is a socialist; she says it and has admitted it previously. Now she may have changed her mind, and if she has changed her mind, so be it. But at least she should tell us that she has changed her mind and not be misleading us."

— Padraig Flynn during an appearance on RTÉ Radio 1 on 3 November 1990

On 3 November, just days before voting was due to take place, cabinet minister Pádraig Flynn of Fianna Fáil made an appearance on the RTÉ Radio 1 show Saturday View alongside Michael McDowell of the Progressive Democrats and Brendan Howlin of the Labour Party. During the segment, Flynn launched a personal attack on Mary Robinson, accusing her of "having a new-found interest in her family" as part of a new public persona introduced for the campaign. An infuriated McDowell, whose party had been broadly sympathetic to Lenihan and Fianna Fáil until that moment, excoriated Flynn, immediately calling the remarks a "disgrace", called upon Flynn to withdraw them and told him to "learn some manners". Similarly, an incensed Howlin called the remarks typical of a Fianna Fáil campaign in which "no dirt was too awful, no smear too great", and accused Flynn of outright lying about Robinson. Flynn did not withdraw the remark during the course of the programme, however, following an immediate and powerful public backlash, Flynn hurried to publicly withdraw the remark later the same day.

Flynn's attack was a fatal blow to Lenihan's campaign, causing many female supporters of Lenihan to vote for Robinson in a gesture of support.

== Opinion polling ==
| Last date of polling | Commissioner | Polling firm | Sample size | Sources | Robinson | Lenihan | Currie | Undecided |
|---|---|---|---|---|---|---|---|---|
| 3 November 1990 | The Irish Times | MRBI | ? | | 39% | 39% | 13% | 9% |
| 22 October 1990 | Fine Gael | MRBI | ? | | 31% | 39% | 17% | 13% |
| 6 October 1990 | The Irish Times | MRBI | ? | | 27% | 42% | 17% | 14% |
| 29 September 1990 | Fine Gael | MRBI | ? | | 29% | 42% | 15% | 14% |

== Result ==
Lenihan received a relative majority of first-preference votes. Robinson received more than twice as many votes as Currie, and 76.73% of Currie's votes transferred to Robinson, beating Lenihan into second place and electing Robinson as Ireland's first female president.

1990 Irish presidential election
| Candidate | Nominated by | % 1st Pref | Count 1 | Count 2 |
|---|---|---|---|---|
| Mary Robinson | Oireachtas: Labour Party and Workers' Party | 38.9 | 612,265 | 817,830 |
| Brian Lenihan | Oireachtas: Fianna Fáil | 44.1 | 694,484 | 731,273 |
| Austin Currie | Oireachtas: Fine Gael | 17.0 | 267,902 | |
Electorate: 2,471,308 Valid: 1,574,651 Spoilt: 9,444 (0.6%) Quota: 787,326 Turnout: 64.1%

First preference vote
| Lenihan | 44.1% |
| Robinson | 38.9% |
| Currie | 17.0% |

Final percentage
| Robinson | 51.9% |
| Lenihan | 46.5% |

=== Results by constituency ===
First count votes
| Constituency | Currie | | Lenihan | | Robinson | | Spoiled ballots (Note: The percentage of spoiled votes is out of all ballots cast, not the valid poll. Thus, the percentages sum to more than 100%.) | | Turnout | |
| Constituency | Votes | % | Votes | % | Votes | % | Votes | % | Votes | % |
|---|---|---|---|---|---|---|---|---|---|---|
| Carlow–Kilkenny | 9,941 | 18.8 | 23,808 | 45.1 | 19,054 | 36.1 | 335 | 0.6 | 53,138 | 66.5 |
| Cavan–Monaghan | 10,049 | 21.2 | 25,365 | 53.6 | 11,923 | 25.2 | 333 | 0.7 | 47,670 | 62.0 |
| Clare | 7,956 | 18.3 | 21,669 | 50.0 | 13,745 | 31.7 | 233 | 0.5 | 43,603 | 67.3 |
| Cork East | 7,048 | 18.5 | 16,928 | 44.4 | 14,124 | 37.1 | 160 | 0.4 | 38,260 | 67.6 |
| Cork North-Central | 6,038 | 15.5 | 15,020 | 38.6 | 17,832 | 45.9 | 265 | 0.7 | 39,155 | 62.0 |
| Cork North-West | 8,414 | 27.7 | 13,843 | 45.5 | 8,162 | 26.8 | 150 | 0.5 | 30,569 | 74.3 |
| Cork South-Central | 9,254 | 17.3 | 18,176 | 33.9 | 26,226 | 48.8 | 270 | 0.5 | 53,926 | 68.0 |
| Cork South-West | 8,623 | 29.1 | 11,957 | 40.4 | 9,034 | 30.5 | 136 | 0.5 | 29,750 | 69.3 |
| Donegal North-East | 3,958 | 17.1 | 12,834 | 55.3 | 6,397 | 27.6 | 159 | 0.7 | 23,348 | 51.2 |
| Donegal South-West | 4,794 | 19.0 | 13,344 | 53.0 | 7,058 | 28.0 | 167 | 0.7 | 25,363 | 53.3 |
| Dublin Central | 4,711 | 12.3 | 17,855 | 46.7 | 15,683 | 41.0 | 365 | 1.0 | 38,614 | 59.6 |
| Dublin North | 3,931 | 11.4 | 14,812 | 43.1 | 15,637 | 45.5 | 206 | 0.6 | 34,586 | 66.0 |
| Dublin North-Central | 4,752 | 12.7 | 16,658 | 44.5 | 16,064 | 42.8 | 289 | 0.8 | 37,763 | 68.0 |
| Dublin North-East | 3,690 | 11.0 | 13,939 | 41.3 | 16,082 | 47.7 | 230 | 0.7 | 33,941 | 63.3 |
| Dublin North-West | 2,795 | 10.1 | 11,611 | 42.0 | 13,240 | 47.9 | 327 | 1.2 | 27,973 | 58.3 |
| Dublin South | 9,646 | 17.0 | 17,948 | 31.7 | 29,103 | 51.3 | 282 | 0.5 | 56,979 | 67.5 |
| Dublin South-Central | 5,578 | 13.0 | 16,847 | 39.4 | 20,394 | 47.6 | 333 | 0.8 | 43,152 | 60.1 |
| Dublin South-East | 5,528 | 16.6 | 10,573 | 31.7 | 17,262 | 51.7 | 216 | 0.6 | 33,579 | 59.0 |
| Dublin South-West | 3,661 | 9.9 | 15,340 | 41.7 | 17,826 | 48.4 | 288 | 0.8 | 37,115 | 55.7 |
| Dublin West | 6,439 | 13.4 | 21,987 | 45.6 | 19,772 | 41.0 | 284 | 0.6 | 48,482 | 61.3 |
| Dún Laoghaire | 8,957 | 17.0 | 14,974 | 28.4 | 28,815 | 54.6 | 198 | 0.4 | 52,944 | 65.0 |
| Galway East | 5,629 | 20.4 | 13,883 | 50.4 | 8,043 | 29.2 | 89 | 0.3 | 27,644 | 65.1 |
| Galway West | 8,094 | 17.6 | 18,885 | 41.1 | 18,978 | 41.3 | 260 | 0.6 | 46,217 | 59.3 |
| Kerry North | 5,192 | 17.2 | 13,896 | 45.9 | 11,155 | 36.9 | 218 | 0.7 | 30,461 | 64.0 |
| Kerry South | 4,891 | 17.2 | 14,230 | 50.0 | 9,336 | 32.8 | 151 | 0.5 | 28,608 | 66.6 |
| Kildare | 7,701 | 15.2 | 21,388 | 42.2 | 21,638 | 42.6 | 162 | 0.3 | 50,889 | 63.1 |
| Laois–Offaly | 8,690 | 17.1 | 25,635 | 50.4 | 16,571 | 32.5 | 257 | 0.5 | 51,153 | 68.0 |
| Limerick East | 7,498 | 17.6 | 14,583 | 34.2 | 20,527 | 48.2 | 210 | 0.5 | 42,818 | 63.4 |
| Limerick West | 5,955 | 19.3 | 16,055 | 51.2 | 8,766 | 28.5 | 182 | 0.6 | 30,958 | 70.6 |
| Longford–Westmeath | 7,716 | 18.7 | 21,860 | 52.9 | 11,741 | 28.4 | 234 | 0.6 | 41,551 | 66.6 |
| Louth | 5,588 | 14.1 | 20,134 | 50.8 | 13,894 | 35.1 | 359 | 0.9 | 39,975 | 62.9 |
| Mayo East | 5,023 | 18.7 | 11,838 | 44.2 | 9,947 | 37.1 | 177 | 0.7 | 26,985 | 67.6 |
| Mayo West | 4,706 | 18.3 | 12,114 | 47.1 | 8,905 | 34.6 | 98 | 0.4 | 25,823 | 65.0 |
| Meath | 8,174 | 16.7 | 23,960 | 49.0 | 16,818 | 34.3 | 313 | 0.6 | 49,265 | 63.2 |
| Roscommon | 6,482 | 23.0 | 14,454 | 51.3 | 7,223 | 25.7 | 138 | 0.5 | 28,297 | 69.7 |
| Sligo–Leitrim | 7,794 | 20.3 | 18,917 | 49.3 | 11,660 | 30.4 | 237 | 0.6 | 38,608 | 65.6 |
| Tipperary North | 5,822 | 20.0 | 14,373 | 49.4 | 8,926 | 30.6 | 188 | 0.6 | 29,309 | 70.2 |
| Tipperary South | 7,227 | 19.4 | 17,317 | 46.4 | 12,751 | 34.2 | 233 | 0.6 | 37,528 | 67.9 |
| Waterford | 6,160 | 15.9 | 17,236 | 44.5 | 15,359 | 39.6 | 163 | 0.4 | 38,918 | 63.6 |
| Wexford | 7,906 | 16.8 | 21,790 | 46.5 | 17,201 | 36.7 | 295 | 0.6 | 47,192 | 65.2 |
| Wicklow | 5,891 | 14.1 | 16,448 | 39.4 | 19,393 | 46.5 | 254 | 0.6 | 41,986 | 62.2 |
| Total | 267,902 | 17.0 | 694,484 | 44.1 | 612,265 | 38.9 | 9,444 | 0.6 | 1,584,095 | 64.1 |

Second count result
| Constituency | Lenihan | | Robinson | |
| Constituency | Votes | % | Votes | % |
|---|---|---|---|---|
| Carlow–Kilkenny | 25,103 | 48.4% | 26,733 | 51.6% |
| Cavan–Monaghan | 26,796 | 57.7% | 19,664 | 42.3% |
| Clare | 22,715 | 53.2% | 20,004 | 46.8% |
| Cork East | 17,836 | 47.8% | 19,438 | 52.2% |
| Cork North-Central | 15,934 | 41.6% | 22,346 | 58.4% |
| Cork North-West | 14,896 | 50.3% | 14,711 | 49.7% |
| Cork South-Central | 19,416 | 36.8% | 33,301 | 63.2% |
| Cork South-West | 13,084 | 45.6% | 15,640 | 54.4% |
| Donegal North-East | 13,384 | 59.4% | 9,162 | 40.6% |
| Donegal South-West | 13,915 | 56.5% | 10,730 | 43.5% |
| Dublin Central | 18,648 | 49.5% | 19,042 | 50.5% |
| Dublin North | 15,458 | 45.5% | 18,563 | 54.5% |
| Dublin North-Central | 17,394 | 47.1% | 19,585 | 52.9% |
| Dublin North-East | 14,537 | 43.7% | 18,772 | 56.3% |
| Dublin North-West | 12,059 | 44.2% | 15,281 | 55.8% |
| Dublin South | 19,330 | 34.7% | 36,473 | 65.3% |
| Dublin South-Central | 17,743 | 42.0% | 24,517 | 58.0% |
| Dublin South-East | 11,358 | 34.7% | 21,418 | 65.3% |
| Dublin South-West | 15,894 | 43.6% | 20,573 | 56.4% |
| Dublin West | 22,959 | 48.3% | 24,668 | 51.7% |
| Dún Laoghaire | 16,293 | 31.5% | 35,527 | 68.5% |
| Galway East | 14,486 | 53.4% | 12,651 | 46.6% |
| Galway West | 19,875 | 43.9% | 25,472 | 56.1% |
| Kerry North | 14,669 | 49.3% | 15,096 | 50.7% |
| Kerry South | 14,812 | 52.9% | 13,238 | 47.1% |
| Kildare | 22,493 | 45.1% | 27,467 | 54.9% |
| Laois–Offaly | 26,740 | 53.4% | 23,397 | 46.6% |
| Limerick East | 15,589 | 37.3% | 26,235 | 62.7% |
| Limerick West | 16,834 | 55.8% | 13,380 | 44.2% |
| Longford–Westmeath | 22,881 | 56.3% | 17,795 | 43.7% |
| Louth | 21,070 | 53.9% | 18,053 | 46.1% |
| Mayo East | 12,362 | 46.7% | 14,162 | 53.3% |
| Mayo West | 12,566 | 49.5% | 12,845 | 50.5% |
| Meath | 25,122 | 52.2% | 23,037 | 47.8% |
| Roscommon | 15,185 | 54.9% | 12,495 | 45.1% |
| Sligo–Leitrim | 19,906 | 52.7% | 17,882 | 47.3% |
| Tipperary North | 15,119 | 52.9% | 13,483 | 47.1% |
| Tipperary South | 18,299 | 50.2% | 18,214 | 49.8% |
| Waterford | 18,170 | 47.8% | 19,880 | 52.2% |
| Wexford | 22,990 | 49.9% | 23,058 | 50.1% |
| Wicklow | 17,353 | 42.2% | 23,842 | 57.8% |
| Total | 731,273 | 46.5% | 817,830 | 51.9% |

== Aftermath ==
I was elected by the women of Ireland, Mná na hÉireann, who instead of rocking the cradle...rocked the system!

— Mary Robinson, Victory speech, 9 November 1990

Video footage of Robinson's Inauguration speech as President of Ireland

Both the immediate and long-term reactions to Robinson's election were to declare it a turning point in Irish social and political history. The Irish Press, a national newspaper staunchly aligned with Fianna Fáil, immediately stated that the election "signals a change in Irish society and a shift away from traditional attitudes and allegiances".

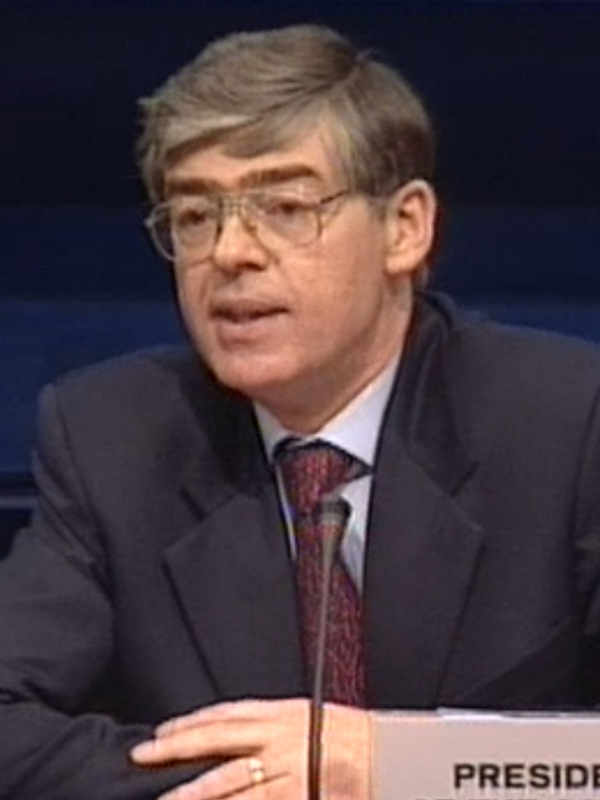
The result of the election brought an immediate end to the leadership of Alan Dukes over Fine Gael.

The result obtained by Austin Currie for Fine Gael, just 17%, was considered a terrible result for the party and immediately undermined the credibility of party leader Alan Dukes. Dukes resigned his position as party leader on 20 November 1990.
