= 1976 Irish presidential election =

- 3 December 1976 (Unopposed)
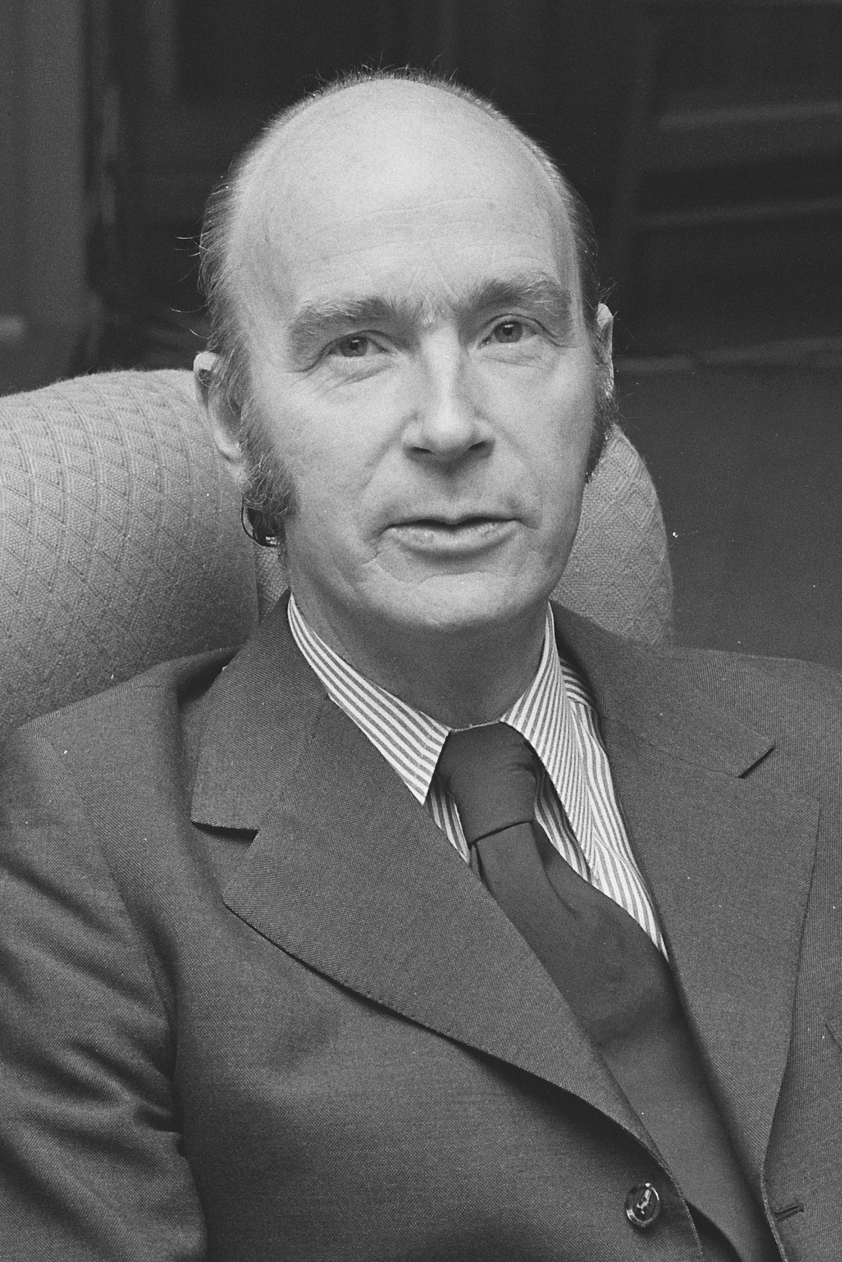
Nominee	Patrick Hillery
Party	Fianna Fáil
President before election
Cearbhall Ó Dálaigh (Note: The powers and functions of the president were exercised and performed by the Presidential Commission from the resignation of Cearbhall Ó Dálaigh on 22 October until the inauguration of Patrick Hillery on 3 December.)
Independent
Elected President
Patrick Hillery
Fianna Fáil

The 1976 Irish presidential election was precipitated by the resignation of President Cearbhall Ó Dálaigh in October 1976. Patrick Hillery was elected unopposed as the sixth president of Ireland.

== Background to the election ==
Cearbhall Ó Dálaigh resigned as president soon after an attack on him by Paddy Donegan, the Minister for Defence, in which the minister called the President a "thundering disgrace" for having referred the Emergency Powers Bill 1976 to the Supreme Court. Ó Dálaigh resigned on 22 October after Dáil Éireann supported the minister in a motion of no confidence.

== Nomination process ==
Under Article 12 of the Constitution of Ireland, a candidate for president could be nominated by:

- at least twenty of the 204 serving members of the Houses of the Oireachtas, or
- at least four of 31 councils of the administrative counties, including county boroughs, or
- Themselves, if a former or incumbent president.

Fianna Fáil leader Jack Lynch proposed as the party's presidential election candidate Patrick Hillery, retiring European Commissioner for Social Affairs and former Minister for External Affairs. Charles Haughey, a critic of Lynch, proposed Joseph Brennan, TD for Donegal–Leitrim and a former Minister for Social Welfare. Hillery easily won the party nomination.

The government parties, Fine Gael and the Labour Party, did not nominate a candidate due to the row over Ó Dálaigh's resignation and the government's role in it. As no other candidate was nominated, it was not necessary to proceed to a ballot for the election.

== Result ==
1976 Irish presidential election
Candidate	Nominated by
Patrick Hillery	Oireachtas: Fianna Fáil

Patrick Hillery was inaugurated as president on Friday, 3 December.
