= Independent politician (Ireland) =

Aspect of politics in Ireland

Independent politicians
- Dáil Éireann: 14 / 174 (8%)
- Seanad Éireann: 13 / 60 (22%)
- European Parliament: 2 / 14 (14%)
- Local government: 190 / 949 (20%)

Independent politicians contest elections without the support of a political party. They have played a continuous role in the politics of Ireland since its independence in 1922.

== Provision for independents in electoral law ==
If a candidate is not the candidate of a registered political party, they may be nominated for elections to Dáil Éireann with the assent of 30 electors in the constituency, for elections to the European Parliament with the assent of 60 electors in the constituency, and for local elections with the assent of 15 electors in the local electoral area. They may choose to have the designation non-party next to their name on the ballot paper.

In Seanad elections and presidential elections, candidates are not nominated by parties directly, and party labels do not appear on the ballot.

== Independents supporting governments ==
In the case of minority governments, where the party or parties forming the government do not have a majority in the Dáil, they will usually be dependent on independent TDs in votes of confidence or to pass the budget. This can be by formal arrangement with the government.

== Independent government ministers ==
In the first inter-party government (1948–1951), James Dillon served as Minister for Agriculture. He was an independent TD, having left Fine Gael in 1942 because he disagreed with the policy of neutrality during World War II. He rejoined Fine Gael in 1953 and became leader in 1959.

In 2009, Mary Harney continued as Minister for Health as an independent member of the government after the dissolution of the Progressive Democrats, and served until 2011.

After the 2016 general election, three independent TDs were appointed to a minority Fine Gael–Independent government on 6 May 2016: Denis Naughten as Minister for Communications, Climate Action and Environment, Shane Ross as Minister for Transport, Tourism and Sport, and Katherine Zappone as Minister for Children and Youth Affairs. Ross was a member of the Independent Alliance, and other members of the Independent Alliance were appointed as Ministers of State. Naughten resigned as minister on 11 October 2018. Ross and Zappone served until the appointment of a new government on 27 June 2020. After the 2016 general election, three independent TDs were appointed to a minority Fine Gael–Independent government on 6 May 2016: Denis Naughten as Minister for Communications, Climate Action and Environment, Shane Ross as Minister for Transport, Tourism and Sport, and Katherine Zappone as Minister for Children and Youth Affairs. Ross was a member of the Independent Alliance, and other members of the Independent Alliance were appointed as Ministers of State. Naughten resigned as minister on 11 October 2018. Ross and Zappone served until the appointment of a new government on 27 June 2020. After the 2024 general election, five independent TDs were appointed as ministers of state in a majority Fianna Fáil–Fine Gael–Independent government. Noel Grealish, Seán Canney, Kevin "Boxer" Moran , Michael Healy-Rae and Marian Harkin were appointed to various junior ministries. Healy-Rae resigned as minister during a confidence vote on 15 April 2026.

== Local government ==
At the 2024 local elections, independents won 178 of the 949 seats on city and county councils.

== European Parliament ==
Two independent MEPs represent Ireland in the European Parliament. Luke 'Ming' Flanagan has been MEP for Midlands–North-West since 2014, and Michael McNamara has been MEP for South since 2024.

== President of Ireland ==
The current president of Ireland Catherine Connolly was elected in 2025 having been nominated by members of the Oireachtas from Sinn Féin, Labour Party, Social Democrats, People Before Profit, Solidarity, Green Party, 100% Redress, and independents.

== Election results ==
=== General elections ===
Key for government column:
Independents participated in government
Minority government
Majority government

Election	FPv	%	±	Seats	%	±	Dáil	Government
1921 (S. Ireland HoC)	Elected unopposed			4 / 128	3.1	New	2nd	SF majority 3rd, 4th ministry
1922	48,638	7.8	–	9 / 128	7.0	▲5	3rd	PT SF/CnG minority 5th ministry, 1st executive
1923	85,869	8.1	▲0.3	13 / 153	8.5	▲4	4th	CnG minority 2nd executive
June 1927	153,370	13.4	▲5.3	16 / 153	10.5	▲3	5th	CnG minority 3rd executive
Sep. 1927	92,959	7.9	▼5.5	12 / 153	7.8	▼4	6th	CnG–FP minority 4th, 5th executive
1932	131,890	10.4	▲2.5	14 / 153	9.2	▲2	7th	FF minority 6th executive
1933	68,882	5.0	▼5.4	9 / 153	5.9	▼5	8th	FF minority 7th executive
1937	128,480	9.7	▲4.7	8 / 138	5.8	▼1	9th	FF minority 8th executive, 1st government
1938	60,685	4.7	▼5.0	7 / 138	5.1	▼1	10th	FF majority 2nd government
1943	116,024	8.7	▲4.0	11 / 138	8.0	▲4	11th	FF minority 3rd government
1944	94,852	7.8	▼0.9	10 / 138	7.3	▼1	12th	FF majority 4th government
1948	94,271	7.2	▼0.6	11 / 147	7.5	▲1	13th	FG–Lab–CnP–CnT– NL–MR–Ind majority 5th government
1951	127,234	9.6	▲2.4	14 / 147	9.5	▲3	14th	FF minority 6th government
1954	70,937	5.3	▼4.3	5 / 147	3.4	▼9	15th	FG–Lab–CnT minority 7th government
1957	72,492	5.9	▲0.6	9 / 147	6.1	▲4	16th	FF majority 8th, 9th government
1961	65,963	5.6	▼0.3	6 / 144	4.2	▼3	17th	FF minority 10th government
1965	26,277	2.1	▼3.5	2 / 144	1.4	▼4	18th	FF majority 11th, 12th government
1969	42,230	3.2	▲1.1	1 / 144	0.7	▼1	19th	FF majority 13th government
1973	39,419	2.9	▼0.3	2 / 144	1.4	▲1	20th	FG–Lab majority 14th government
1977	87,527	5.5	▲2.6	4 / 148	2.7	▲2	21st	FF majority 15th, 16th government
1981	63,829	3.7	▼1.8	4 / 166	2.4	Steady	22nd	FG–Lab minority 17th government
Feb. 1982	46,059	2.8	▼0.9	4 / 166	2.4	Steady	23rd	FF minority 18th government
Nov. 1982	38,735	2.3	▼0.5	3 / 166	1.8	▼1	24th	FG–Lab majority 19th government
1987	70,843	4.0	▲1.7	3 / 166	1.8	Steady	25th	FF minority 20th government
1989	54,761	3.3	▼0.7	4 / 166	2.4	▲1	26th	FF–PD majority 21st, 22nd government
1992	99,487	5.8	▲2.5	5 / 166	3.0	▲1	27th	FF–Lab majority 23rd government
1992	99,487	5.8	▲2.5	5 / 166	3.0	▲1	27th	FG–Lab–DL majority 24th government
1997	123,102	7.9	▲2.1	6 / 166	3.6	▲1	28th	FF–PD minority 25th government
2002	176,305	9.5	▲1.6	17 / 166	10.2	▲11	29th	FF–PD majority 26th government
2007	106,429	5.2	▼4.3	5 / 166	3.0	▼12	30th	FF–GP–PD majority 27th, 28th government
2007	106,429	5.2	▼4.3	5 / 166	3.0	▼12	30th	FF–GP–Ind majority 28th government
2011	269,703	12.1	▲6.9	14 / 166	8.4	▲9	31st	FG–Lab supermajority 29th government
2016	338,215	15.9	▲3.8	19 / 158	12.0	▲5	32nd	FG–Ind minority 30th, 31st government
2020	266,529	12.2	▼3.7	19 / 160	11.9	Steady	33rd	FF–FG–GP majority 32nd, 33rd, 34th government
2024	290,746	13.2	▲1.0	16 / 174	9.2	▼3	34th	FF–FG–Ind majority 35th government

=== Presidential elections ===
Election	Nominee	Alliance	1st	Final
1938	Douglas Hyde	List: Fianna Fáil; Fine Gael; Labour	Unopposed	
1945	Patrick McCartan	Labour; Clann na Talmhan	19.6%	—N/a
1952	Seán T. O'Kelly	Fianna Fáil	Unopposed	
No independent contested an election between 1959 and 1990
1997	Dana Rosemary Scallon	—N/a	13.8%	—N/a
1997	Derek Nally	—N/a	4.7%	—N/a
1997	Overall		18.5%	—N/a
2004	Mary McAleese	List: Fianna Fáil; Fine Gael; Progressive Democrats; Labour; Green; Sinn Féin	Unopposed	
2011	Seán Gallagher	—N/a	28.5%	35.5%
2011	David Norris	—N/a	6.2%	—N/a
2011	Dana Rosemary Scallon	—N/a	2.9%	—N/a
2011	Mary Davis	—N/a	2.7%	—N/a
2011	Overall		40.3%	—N/a
2018	Michael D. Higgins	List: Fianna Fáil; Fine Gael; Labour; Social Democrats; Green	55.8%	—N/a
2018	Peter Casey	—N/a	23.3%	—N/a
2018	Seán Gallagher	—N/a	6.4%	—N/a
2018	Joan Freeman	—N/a	6.0%	—N/a
2018	Gavin Duffy	—N/a	2.3%	—N/a
2018	Overall		93.6%	—N/a
2025	Catherine Connolly	List: Sinn Féin; Social Democrats; Labour; PBP–Solidarity; Green Party; 100% Redress; Independents	63.6%	—N/a

== See also ==
- Independent politician
- Independent politicians in Australia
