= 1945 Irish presidential election =

- 14 June 1945
- Turnout: 63.0%
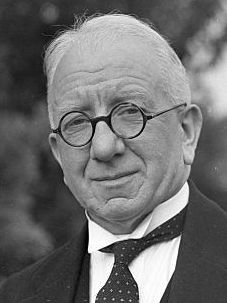

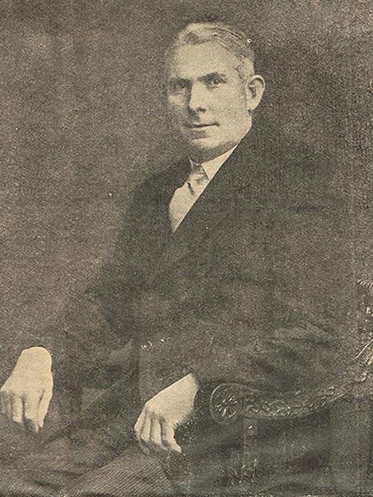

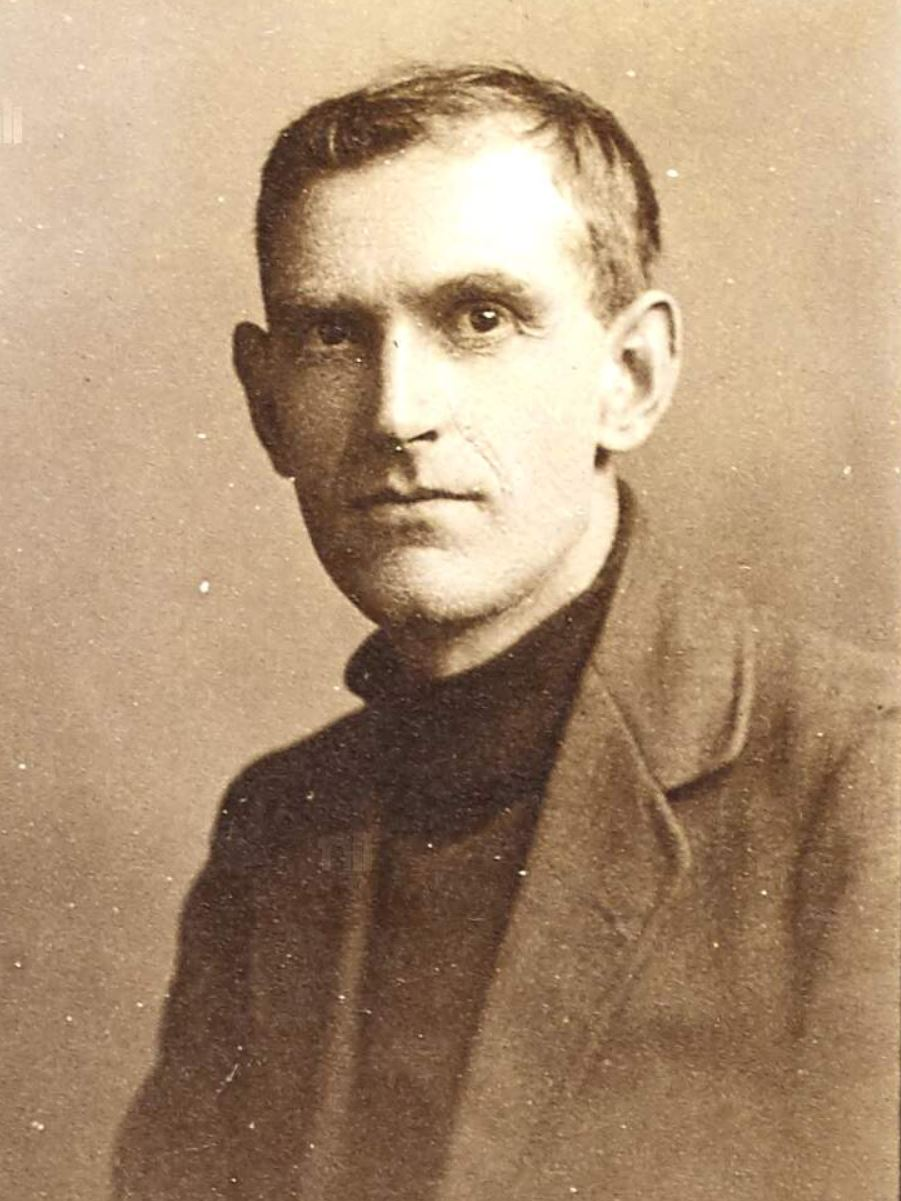
Nominee	Seán T. O'Kelly	Seán Mac Eoin	Patrick McCartan
Party	Fianna Fáil	Fine Gael	Independent
Alliance			Labour Party; Clann na Talmhan
1st preference	537,965; 49.5%	335,539; 30.9%	212,834; 19.6%
Final count	565,165; 52.0%	453,425; 41.7%	Eliminated
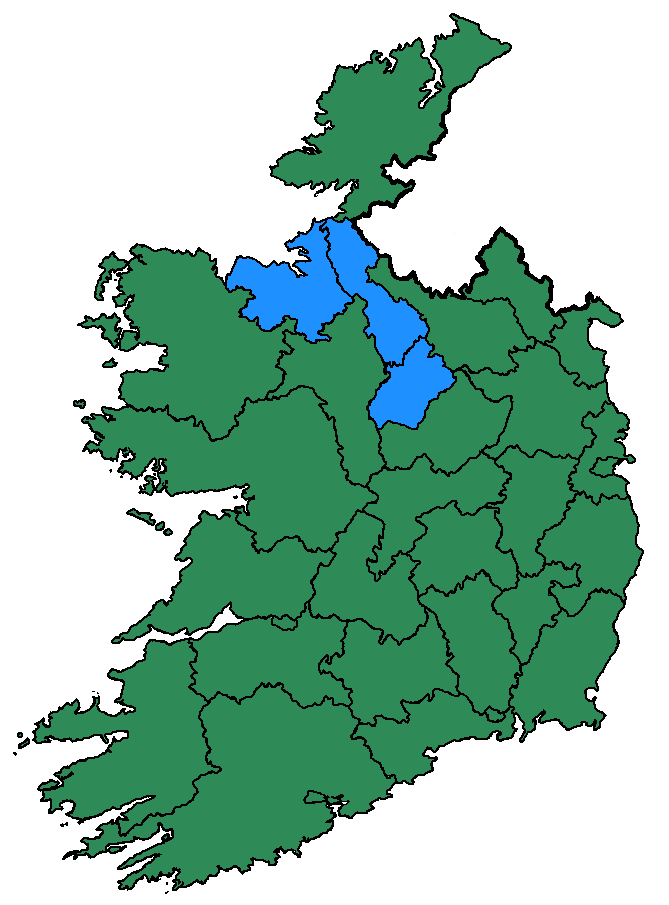
- First count winner by local authority
President before election
Douglas Hyde
Independent
Elected President
Seán T. O'Kelly
Fianna Fáil

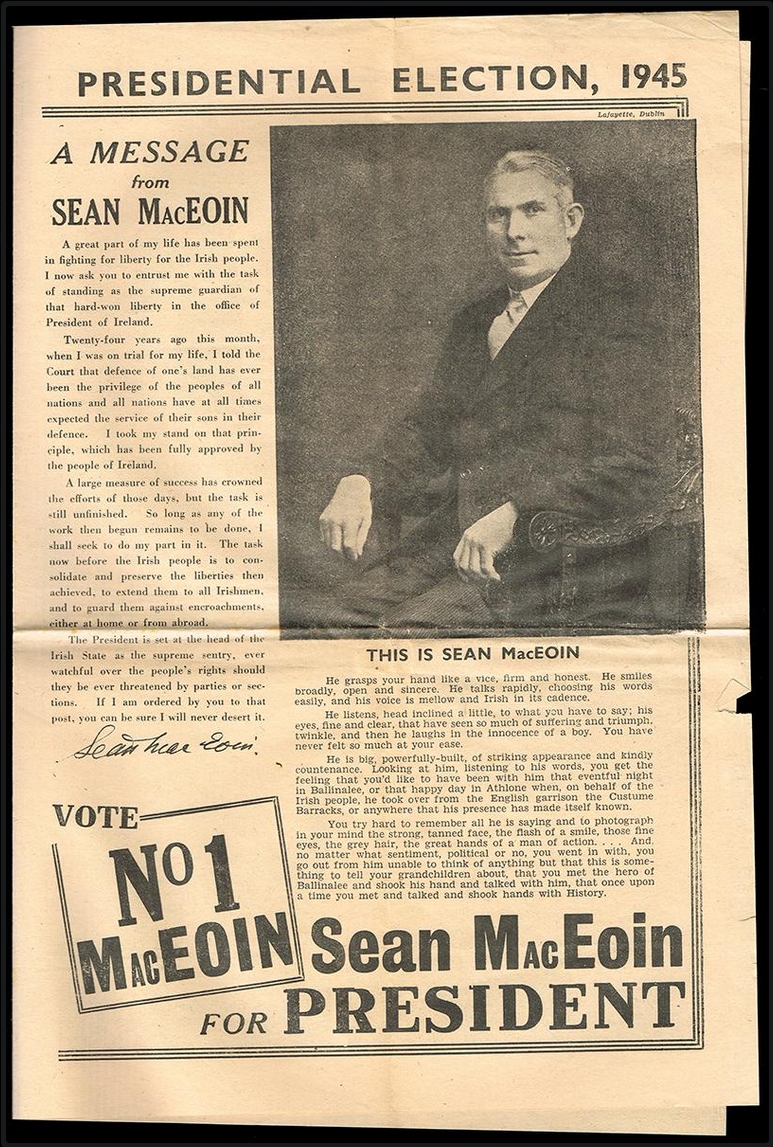
Poster for Seán Mac Eoin

The 1945 Irish presidential election was held on Thursday, 14 June 1945. It was Ireland's first contested presidential election. Outgoing president Douglas Hyde, who had served since 1938, did not seek a second term. Fianna Fáil nominated its deputy leader, Tánaiste Seán T. O'Kelly, as its candidate. Fine Gael nominated Seán Mac Eoin. Independent republican Patrick McCartan sought and failed to receive the necessary four nominations from local councils, but secured a nomination from Oireachtas members.

O'Kelly won on the second count but the degree of voting transfers between the two opposition candidates, and O'Kelly's failure to win on the first count, showed the depth of growing opposition to Éamon de Valera's government and the potential that existed for cooperation among various opposition groups. De Valera's government was defeated in the subsequent 1948 general election and succeeded by the first inter-party government.

The election took place on the same date as the 1945 local elections. Electoral law was amended to allow administrative counties and county boroughs to be used as constituencies instead of using Dáil constituencies, as previously required. This was to facilitate sorting and counting of ballots with ballots for the local elections.

== Nomination process ==
Under Article 12 of the Constitution of Ireland, candidates could be nominated by:

- at least twenty of the 198 serving members of the Houses of the Oireachtas, or
- at least four of 31 councils of the administrative counties, including county boroughs, or
- themselves, in the case of a former or retiring president.

All Irish citizens on the Dáil electoral register were eligible to vote.

The first candidate nominated was Seán Mac Eoin, a Fine Gael TD who was nominated on 5 May by 17 members of his own party, as well as three independent TDs, Alfie Byrne, Tom O'Reilly and Richard Anthony. Seán T. O'Kelly was nominated by Fianna Fáil Oireachtas members on 15 May. On the date before nominations closed on 16 May, the administrative council of the Labour Party voted to allow its Oireachtas members to sign the nomination form of Patrick McCartan, and Clann na Talmhan voted that its Oireachtas members would sign his nomination form, together guaranteeing his position on the ballot.

== Result ==
1945 Irish presidential election
Candidate	Nominated by	% 1st Pref	Count 1	Count 2
Seán T. O'Kelly	Oireachtas: Fianna Fáil	49.5	537,965	565,165
Seán Mac Eoin	Oireachtas: Fine Gael and Independents	30.9	335,539	453,425
Patrick McCartan	Oireachtas: Labour Party and Clann na Talmhan	19.6	212,834	
Electorate: 1,803,463 Valid: 1,086,338 Spoilt: 50,287 (4.4%) Quota: 543,170 Turnout: 63.0%

First preference vote
O'Kelly	49.5%
Mac Eoin	30.9%
McCartan	19.6%

Final percentage
O'Kelly	52.0%
Mac Eoin	41.7%

=== Results by local authority ===
Results were announced by county councils and county borough corporations rather than by constituency.

First count votes
Local Authority	O'Kelly		Mac Eoin		McCartan	
Local Authority	Votes	%	Votes	%	Votes	%
Carlow County	6,178	46.76	5,197	39.33	1,838	13.91
Cavan County	14,500	49.29	11,883	40.40	3,032	10.31
Clare County	22,910	57.73	10,796	27.20	5,979	15.07
Cork County	49,737	44.09	38,911	34.49	24,163	21.42
Cork County Borough	13,875	50.25	9,025	32.68	4,714	17.07
Donegal County	24,999	54.38	13,137	28.58	7,834	17.04
Dublin County	16,206	43.00	11,665	30.95	9,815	26.04
Dublin County Borough	70,777	45.94	39,273	25.49	44,027	28.57
Galway County	32,496	57.66	12,713	22.56	11,153	19.79
Kerry County	20,589	56.77	7,180	19.80	8,500	23.44
Kildare County	11,426	54.11	6,731	31.88	2,958	14.01
Kilkenny County	13,437	53.60	8,158	32.54	3,476	13.86
Laois County	8,946	45.85	5,683	29.12	4,884	25.03
Leitrim County	8,064	39.52	9,344	45.80	2,995	14.68
Limerick County	22,725	55.88	13,183	32.42	4,758	11.70
Limerick County Borough	9,318	56.18	4,731	28.52	2,538	15.30
Longford County	5,848	35.09	10,170	61.03	646	3.88
Louth County	13,685	49.32	9,395	33.86	4,668	16.82
Mayo County	27,260	50.08	14,672	26.95	12,505	22.97
Meath County	14,083	58.02	6,784	27.95	3,406	14.03
Monaghan County	13,042	54.38	6,878	28.68	4,062	16.94
Offaly County	10,580	53.13	5,199	26.11	4,136	20.77
Roscommon County	15,354	47.62	11,747	36.43	5,140	15.94
Sligo County	10,288	39.72	12,026	46.43	3,590	13.86
Tipperary North County	12,477	52.09	7,530	31.44	3,946	16.47
Tipperary South County	15,940	50.45	10,499	33.23	5,155	16.32
Waterford County	10,980	58.85	5,198	27.86	2,481	13.30
Waterford County Borough	5,898	52.19	3,267	28.91	2,135	18.89
Westmeath County	10,303	47.52	9,741	44.93	1,636	7.55
Wexford County	16,380	46.87	10,082	28.85	8,488	24.29
Wicklow County	9,664	42.80	4,741	21.00	8,176	36.21
Total	537,965	49.52	335,539	30.89	212,834	19.59

Second count result
Local Authority	O'Kelly		Mac Eoin	
Local Authority	Votes	%	Votes	%
Carlow County	6,615	52.41	6,007	47.59
Cavan County	15,010	52.82	13,406	47.18
Clare County	23,668	63.00	13,902	37.00
Cork County	52,350	49.84	52,688	50.16
Cork County Borough	14,504	55.50	11,627	44.50
Donegal County	25,881	61.44	16,244	38.56
Dublin County	17,317	48.29	18,546	51.71
Dublin County Borough	76,119	52.84	67,947	47.16
Galway County	33,653	65.42	17,788	34.58
Kerry County	21,627	65.09	11,599	34.91
Kildare County	11,869	58.63	8,376	41.37
Kilkenny County	13,921	57.86	10,140	42.14
Laois County	9,540	54.59	7,937	45.41
Leitrim County	8,497	44.43	10,626	55.57
Limerick County and County Borough	33,127	60.28	21,828	39.72
Longford County	5,974	36.29	10,486	63.71
Louth County	14,312	54.42	11,987	45.58
Mayo County	28,418	57.86	20,695	42.14
Meath County	14,655	62.80	8,680	37.20
Monaghan County	13,671	61.87	8,427	38.13
Offaly County	11,672	62.70	6,944	37.30
Roscommon County	15,853	52.22	14,507	47.78
Sligo County	10,857	44.25	13,676	55.75
Tipperary North County	13,082	57.52	9,660	42.48
Tipperary South County	16,696	55.24	13,531	44.76
Waterford County	11,251	62.82	6,658	37.18
Waterford County Borough	6,215	57.82	4,533	42.18
Westmeath County	10,620	50.17	10,548	49.83
Wexford County	17,209	53.32	15,065	46.68
Wicklow County	10,982	53.97	9,367	46.03
Total	565,165	52.02	453,425	41.74
