= 1983 Irish presidential election =

- 23 November 1983 (Unopposed)
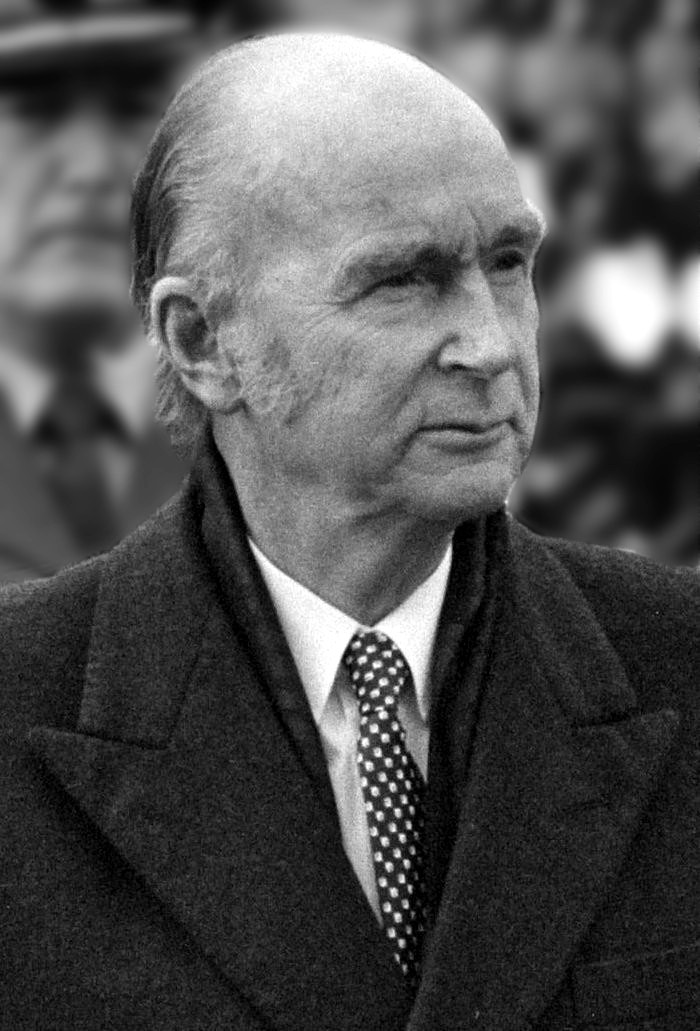
Nominee	Patrick Hillery
Party	Independent
President before election
Patrick Hillery
Fianna Fáil
Elected President
Patrick Hillery
Independent

In the 1983 Irish presidential election outgoing President Patrick Hillery agreed under enormous political pressure to seek a second term. Though former Nobel Peace Prize and Lenin Peace Prize winner Seán MacBride made it known in the Sunday Press that he wanted to contest the office, only Hillery was nominated and was declared re-elected without the need for a poll.

== Procedure ==
Under Article 12 of the Constitution of Ireland, candidates could be nominated by:

- at least twenty of the 226 serving members of the Houses of the Oireachtas, or
- at least four of 31 councils of the administrative counties, including county boroughs, or
- themselves, in the case of a former or retiring president.

All Irish citizens on the Dáil electoral register were eligible to vote.

== Result ==
The Minister for the Environment made the order opening nominations on 7 October, with noon on 21 October as the deadline for nominations, and 23 November set as the date for a contest. The only candidate nominated was Patrick Hillery, who had the right to nominate himself, and he was declared elected at the close of nominations.

1983 Irish presidential election
Candidate	Nominated by
Patrick Hillery	Self-nomination

Hillery was inaugurated for his second term as President of Ireland on Saturday, 3 December 1983.

== See also ==
- President of Ireland
