= 1938 Irish presidential election =

- 31 May 1938 (Unopposed)
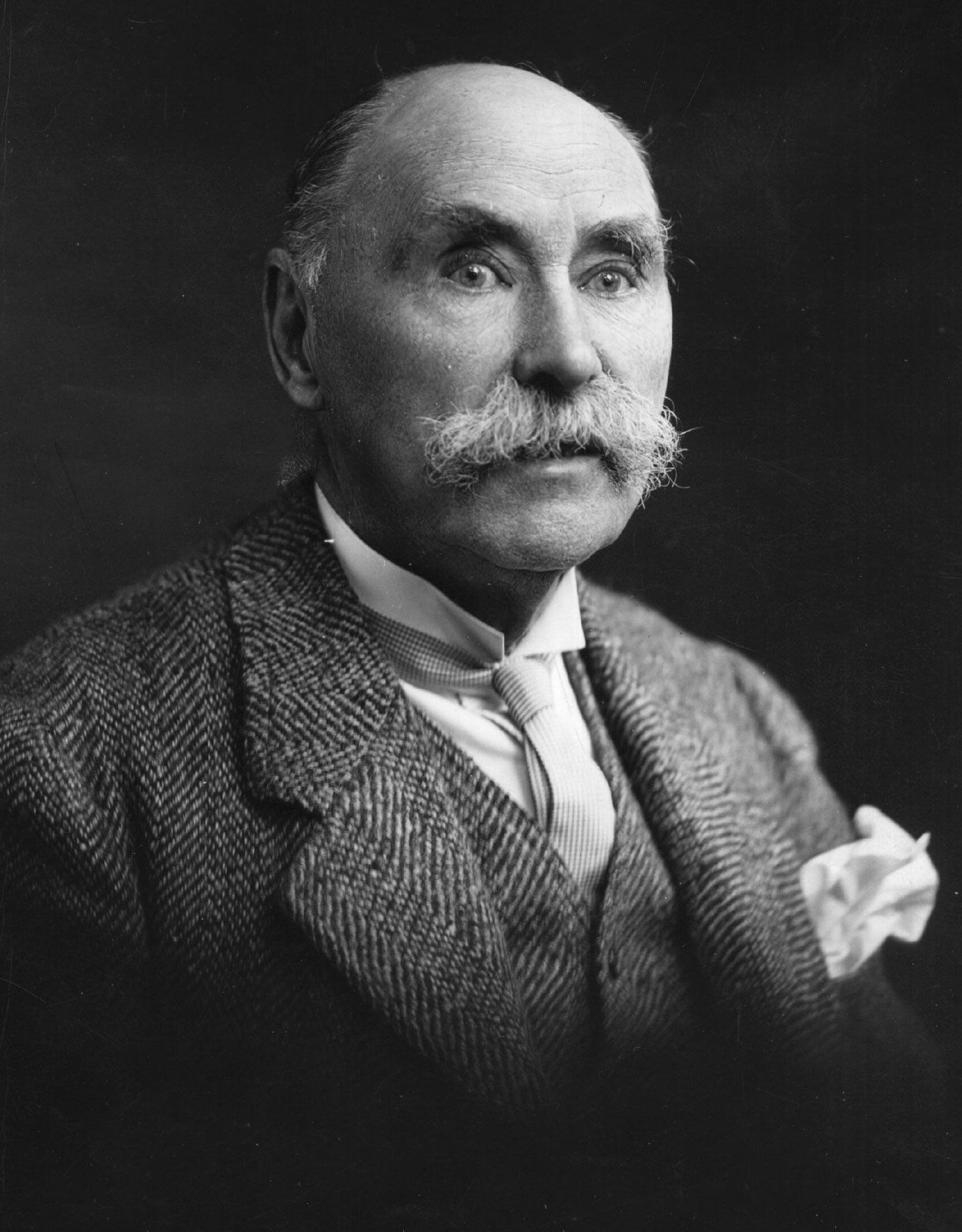
Nominee	Douglas Hyde
Party	Independent
President before election
New office
Elected President
Douglas Hyde
Independent

The 1938 Irish presidential election was the first Irish presidential election, held to fill the new office of president of Ireland.

== Procedure ==
The office of president was established by Article 12 of the new Constitution of Ireland, which came into force on 29 December 1937. Article 57 of the Constitution provided that the president would enter office not later than 180 days after that date. Until the inauguration of the first president, the powers and functions of the office were carried out by a Presidential Commission consisting of the Chief Justice, the President of the High Court and the Ceann Comhairle.

On 14 April 1938, Minister for Local Government and Public Health Seán T. O'Kelly made an order under section 6 of the Presidential Elections Act 1937 opening nominations, with noon on 4 May as the deadline for nominations, and 31 May set as the date for a poll (if any).

Under Article 12, candidates could be nominated by:

- at least twenty of the 198 serving members of the Houses of the Oireachtas, or
- at least four of 31 councils of the administrative counties, including county boroughs.

All Irish citizens on the Dáil electoral register were eligible to vote.

== Nomination process ==
The first candidate to seek a nomination was Alfie Byrne, who had been serving as Lord Mayor of Dublin since 1930, and would continue in that position until 1939.

On 21 April, representatives of the two major parties, Fianna Fáil and Fine Gael, met and agreed to nominate Douglas Hyde for the office. Hyde had been the first president of the Gaelic League, from 1893 to 1915, and was a nominated member of the 2nd Seanad. The following day, Labour Party leader William Norton expressed his approval in the Dáil of the nomination of Hyde, and Alfie Byrne issued a statement ending his nomination campaign.

At the close of nominations, Hyde was the only nominated candidate, with two separate nomination forms received on behalf of Fianna Fáil and Fine Gael Oireachtas members. Accepting the nominations and his election to office on 4 May, Hyde said, "I accept this office willingly, but with humility. I will do my best to carry out my duties in the future".

== Result ==
1938 Irish presidential election
Candidate	Nominated by
Douglas Hyde	Fianna Fáil and Fine Gael

After the close of nominations on 4 May, the election scheduled for 31 May was cancelled as superfluous, and 1 June was set as the date of Hyde's inauguration as President. However, on 27 May, the 9th Dáil was dissolved and a general election called for 17 June. Since the Constitution mandates that members of the Dáil be present when the President takes his oath of office, the inauguration was postponed until 25 June.
