= 1973 Irish presidential election =

- 30 May 1973
- Turnout: 62.2% (▼3.1 pp)

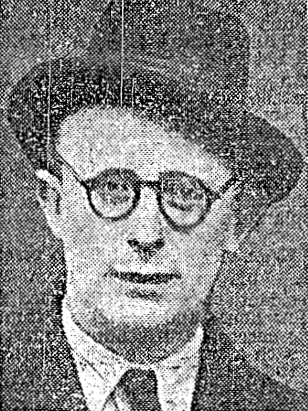
Nominee	Erskine H. Childers	Tom O'Higgins
Party	Fianna Fáil	Fine Gael
1st preference	635,867 (52.0%)	587,771 (48.0%)
President before election
Éamon de Valera
Fianna Fáil
Elected President
Erskine H. Childers
Fianna Fáil

The 1973 Irish presidential election was held on Wednesday, 30 May 1973. The outgoing president Éamon de Valera was ineligible for re-election after serving two terms in office. Former Tánaiste Erskine H. Childers, nominated by Fianna Fáil, was elected as president of Ireland, defeating Fine Gael deputy leader, Tom O'Higgins, who had come within 1% of defeating Éamon de Valera in the 1966 presidential election.

== Nomination process ==
Under Article 12 of the Constitution of Ireland, a candidate for president could be nominated by:

- at least twenty of the 204 serving members of the Houses of the Oireachtas, or
- at least four of 31 councils of the administrative counties, including county boroughs.

On 25 April, the Minister for Local Government made the order for the presidential election, with noon on 8 May as the date for nominations, and 30 May as the date of polling.

== Campaign ==
O'Higgins was approved as the Fine Gael candidate on 31 January. Childers was approved as the Fianna Fáil candidate on 6 April. George Colley was director of elections for Childers. O'Higgins was the early favourite to win, with odds of 1/2, against 6/4 for Childers.

== Result ==
Candidate	Nominated by	Votes	%
Erskine H. Childers	Oireachtas: Fianna Fáil	635,867	51.97
Tom O'Higgins	Oireachtas: Fine Gael	587,771	48.03
Total		1,223,638	100.00
Valid votes		1,223,638	99.44
Invalid/blank votes		6,946	0.56
Total votes		1,230,584	100.00
Registered voters/turnout		1,977,817	62.22

=== Results by constituency ===
Constituency	Childers		O'Higgins	
Constituency	Votes	%	Votes	%
Carlow–Kilkenny	23,231	52.0	21,458	48.0
Cavan	14,001	51.1	13,399	48.9
Clare	16,412	61.4	10,335	38.6
Clare–South Galway	14,470	56.9	10,946	43.1
Cork City North-West	15,589	62.9	9,196	37.1
Cork City South-East	15,918	60.0	10,625	40.0
Cork Mid	21,603	53.2	19,011	46.8
Cork North-East	20,887	54.8	17,253	45.2
Cork South-West	13,745	47.6	15,102	52.4
Donegal North-East	12,253	56.8	9,329	43.2
Donegal–Leitrim	14,326	55.1	11,689	44.9
Dublin Central	12,081	47.4	13,385	52.6
Dublin County North	18,625	49.5	18,993	50.5
Dublin County South	15,561	48.4	16,586	51.6
Dublin North-Central	14,012	48.0	15,162	52.0
Dublin North-East	16,613	47.9	18,081	52.1
Dublin North-West	12,102	48.2	12,981	51.8
Dublin South-Central	15,117	49.5	15,399	50.5
Dublin South-East	11,540	49.7	11,698	50.3
Dublin South-West	10,924	46.4	12,641	53.6
Dún Laoghaire and Rathdown	18,037	47.9	19,655	52.1
Galway North-East	12,005	50.5	11,756	49.5
Galway West	12,920	55.3	10,458	44.7
Kerry North	12,206	52.5	11,038	47.5
Kerry South	12,280	52.6	11,071	47.4
Kildare	15,689	54.1	13,291	45.9
Laois–Offaly	21,078	50.4	20,740	49.6
Limerick East	17,897	51.4	16,952	48.6
Limerick West	16,013	55.6	12,772	44.4
Longford–Westmeath	17,324	51.9	16,050	48.1
Louth	14,556	55.7	11,575	44.3
Mayo East	11,290	48.2	12,141	51.8
Mayo West	10,983	48.7	11,558	51.3
Meath	14,542	53.7	12,534	46.3
Monaghan	13,706	52.8	12,261	47.2
Roscommon–Leitrim	12,884	47.7	14,127	52.3
Sligo–Leitrim	12,832	50.0	12,829	50.0
Tipperary North	14,723	53.6	12,748	46.4
Tipperary South	20,002	55.0	16,339	45.0
Waterford	15,785	54.6	13,116	45.4
Wexford	16,279	46.3	18,878	53.7
Wicklow	13,826	52.3	12,613	47.7
Total	635,867	52.0	587,771	48.0
