= 1952 Irish presidential election =

- 10 June 1952 (Unopposed)
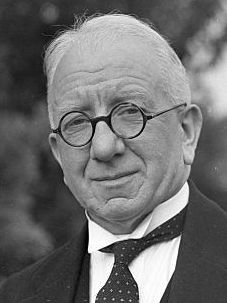
Nominee	Seán T. O'Kelly
Party	Independent
President before election
Seán T. O'Kelly
Fianna Fáil
Elected President
Seán T. O'Kelly
Independent

In the 1952 Irish presidential election the outgoing president Seán T. O'Kelly was re-elected without a contest.

== Procedure ==
Under Article 12 of the Constitution of Ireland, candidates could be nominated by:

- at least twenty of the 207 serving members of the Houses of the Oireachtas, or
- at least four of 31 councils of the administrative counties, including county boroughs, or
- themselves, in the case of a former or retiring president.

All Irish citizens on the Dáil electoral register were eligible to vote.

== Nomination process ==
On 25 April 1952, the Minister for Local Government made an order under section 6 of the Presidential Elections Act 1937 opening nominations, with noon on 16 May as the deadline for nominations, and 10 June set as the date for a poll (if any).

Alfie Byrne, former Lord Mayor of Dublin, sought a nomination but was unsuccessful. He claimed to have received 14 of the 20 nominations from Oireachtas members required to secure a place on the ballot. Seán T. O'Kelly nominated himself as a candidate, and with no other candidate nominated, he was declared elected on 16 May. This was the first occasion on which a president nominated themselves for a second term.

== Result ==
1952 Irish presidential election
Candidate	Nominated by
Seán T. O'Kelly	Self-nomination

O'Kelly was inaugurated for his second term as President of Ireland on 25 June 1952.
