= Presidency of Mary McAleese =

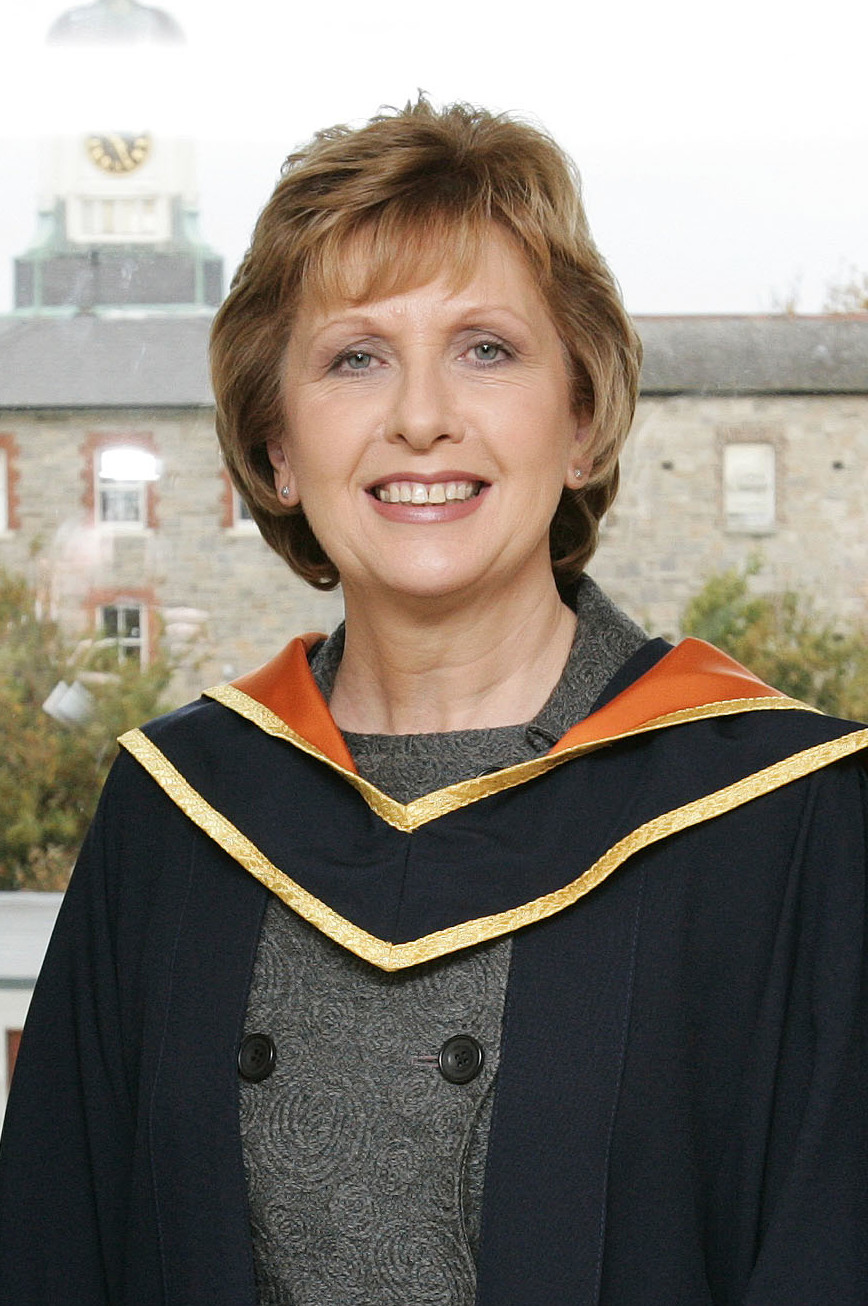
- McAleese in 2007
- Presidency of Mary McAleese; 11 November 1997 – 11 November 2011
- Premier: Bertie Ahern, Brian Cowen, Enda Kenny
- Party: None (Was part of Fianna Fáil before 1997)
- Election: 1997; 2004
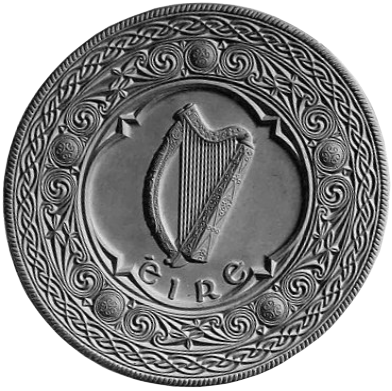
- Seal of the president of Ireland

Mary McAleese began her first term as President of Ireland on 11 November 1997, following her inauguration at Saint Patrick's Hall in the State Apartments in Dublin Castle. McAleese was first elected as president in 1997, having received the nomination of Fianna Fáil. She succeeded Mary Robinson, making her the second female president of Ireland, and the first woman in the world to succeed another woman as an elected head of state.

She nominated herself for re-election in 2004 and was returned unopposed for a second term. McAleese was the first, and to date, only president of Ireland to have come from either Northern Ireland or Ulster.

== Background ==
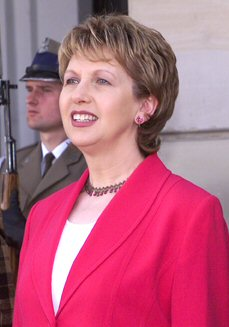
McAleese in 2003

In 1997 McAleese defeated former Taoiseach Albert Reynolds and former minister Michael O'Kennedy in an internal party election held to determine the Fianna Fáil nomination for the Irish presidency. After the first count none of the candidates met the vote threshold, and Reynolds has received the most votes. O'Kennedy was eliminated, and all but one of his voters then changed their preference to McAleese, winning her the candidacy.

Her opponents in the 1997 presidential election were Mary Banotti, nominated by Fine Gael, Adi Roche nominated by the Labour Party, Democratic Left and the Green Party, and two candidates standing as Independents nominated by local authorities: Dana Rosemary Scallon and Derek Nally. McAleese won 45.2% of first preference votes. In the second and final count, McAleese was elected having obtained 55.6% of votes against Banotti.

== First term (1997–2004) ==
=== Inauguration and first months ===
On 11 November 1997 she was inaugurated as the eighth President of Ireland. Within weeks of this, she made her first official overseas trip to Lebanon.

McAllese described the theme of her presidency as "building bridges". The first individual born in Northern Ireland to become President of Ireland, President McAleese was a regular visitor to Northern Ireland throughout her presidency, where she was on the whole warmly welcomed by both communities, confounding critics who had believed she would be a divisive figure. People from Northern Ireland, indeed people from right across the nine-county Province of Ulster, were regular and recurring visitors to Áras an Uachtaráin while she was president. She is also an admirer of Queen Elizabeth II, whom she came to know when she was Pro-Vice-Chancellor of Queen's University of Belfast.

=== Twelfth of July celebrations ===
In March 1998 President McAleese stated that she would officially celebrate the Twelfth of July as well as Saint Patrick's Day, recognising the day's importance among Ulster Protestants.

=== Criticism from Catholic Church ===
She also incurred some criticism from some of the Irish Catholic hierarchy by taking communion in a Church of Ireland (Anglican) Cathedral, in Dublin, on 7 December 1997, although 78 percent of Irish people approved of her action in a following opinion poll. While Cardinal Desmond Connell called her action a "sham" and a "deception", Taoiseach Bertie Ahern said it was ironic that "the Church was condemning an act of reconciliation and bridge-building between the denominations".

=== Comments from Archbishop of Boston ===
In 1998 she met the Archbishop of Boston Cardinal Bernard Francis Law, on an official visit to the United States. In an interview in 2012, she said that Law told her he was "sorry for Catholic Ireland to have you as President" and went on to insult a Minister of State, who was accompanying President McAleese. "His remarks were utterly inappropriate and unwelcome," she said. McAleese told the cardinal that she was the "President of Ireland and not just of Catholic Ireland". At this point, a heated argument ensued between the two, according to McAleese.

=== 2004 presidential election ===
McAleese's first seven-year term of office ended in November 2004, but she stood for a second term in the 2004 presidential election. Following the failure of any other candidate to secure the necessary support for nomination, the incumbent president stood unopposed, with no political party affiliation, and was declared elected on 1 October 2004. Her successor, Michael D. Higgins, indicated his interest in contesting the 2004 presidential election for the Labour Party. The party decided on 16 September 2004 against running a candidate in the election, seeing McAleese as unbeatable.

== Second term (2004–2011) ==
=== Second inauguration ===
McAleese was re-inaugurated at the commencement of her second seven-year term on 11 November 2004. McAleese's very high approval ratings were widely seen as the reason for her re-election, with no opposition party willing to bear the cost (financial or political) of competing in an election that would prove difficult to win.

=== Auschwitz liberation ceremony ===
On 27 January 2005 following her attendance at the ceremony commemorating the sixtieth anniversary of the liberation of Auschwitz concentration camp, she created friction by referring to the way some Protestant children in Northern Ireland had been raised to hate Catholics, just as European children "for generations, for centuries" were encouraged to hate Jews. These remarks provoked outrage among unionist politicians. McAleese later apologised, conceding that her comments had been unbalanced because she had criticised only the sectarianism found on one side of the community.

=== Commencement speaker ===
She was the Commencement Speaker at Villanova University in Villanova, Pennsylvania, on 22 May 2005. The visit prompted protests by conservatives because of the president's professing heterodox Catholic views on homosexuality and women in priesthood. She was the commencement speaker at the University of Notre Dame on 21 May 2006. In her commencement address, among other topics, she spoke of her pride at Notre Dame's Irish heritage, including the nickname the "Fighting Irish".

=== Funeral of Pope John Paul II and papal inauguration of Benedict XVI ===
She attended the funeral of Pope John Paul II on 8 April 2005, and the papal inauguration of Pope Benedict XVI on 24 April 2005.

=== Canonisation of Charles of Mount Argus ===
McAleese attended the canonisation by Pope Benedict XVI in Rome of Charles of Mount Argus on 3 June 2007. She was accompanied by her husband, Martin, Cardinal Desmond Connell, Mary Hanafin, the Minister for Education and Science, together with bishops and other pilgrims. She later met the Pope and embarked on other official duties, including a trip to St. Isidore's College, a talk at the Pontifical Irish College and a Mass said especially for the Irish Embassy at Villa Spada chapel.

=== Speaking out against homophobia ===
In August 2007 she spoke out against homophobia at the International Association of Suicide Prevention 24th Biennial Conference.

=== Visit to Hollywood and California ===
She paid a seven-day visit to Hollywood in December 2008, alongside Enterprise Ireland and the Irish Film Board on a mission to promote the Irish film and television industry. A reception held in her honour was attended by Ed Begley, Jr. and Fionnula Flanagan. She later met the Governor of California, Arnold Schwarzenegger.

=== "The 100 Most Powerful Women" poll by Forbes ===
In 2009 Forbes named her among the hundred most powerful women in the world later that year.

=== Visit to London and Belfast ===
McAleese undertook an official two-day visit to London on 28–29 February 2010, where she visited the site of the 2012 Summer Olympics, and was guest of honour at the Madejski Stadium for a rugby union match between London Irish and Harlequin F.C. On 13 May 2010, she attended the Balmoral Show at the Balmoral Showgrounds, which includes the King's Hall, in south Belfast. Deputy First Minister of Northern Ireland Martin McGuinness and Northern Ireland Agriculture Minister Michelle Gildernew gave her breakfast and walked around with her during the day.

=== Visit to New York City ===
She began an official visit to New York City for several days, on 16 May 2010. She began by appearing at an Irish Voice event in honour of life science. She then addressed business leaders at the New York Stock Exchange to say Irish people were "as mad as hell" over the Irish banking crisis, and opened the An Gorta Mór (Great Famine) exhibition with a speech promising that Ireland's foreign policy focussed on global hunger. She was also present at St. Patrick's Cathedral for a Famine mass and went to the Battery Park City's Irish Hunger Memorial to see the official New York commemoration of the 19th-century Irish Famine. On 22 May 2010, she delivered the keynote address at Fordham University's 165th Commencement.

=== Opening the Bloom Festival ===
She opened the Bloom Festival, Ireland's largest gardening show, on 3 June 2010, acknowledging an improved interest in gardening in Ireland, particularly among younger people.

=== State visit to China ===
On 13 June 2010, McAleese began an official visit to China. She met with Vice President of China Xi Jinping and the pair spoke for 35 minutes over lunch.

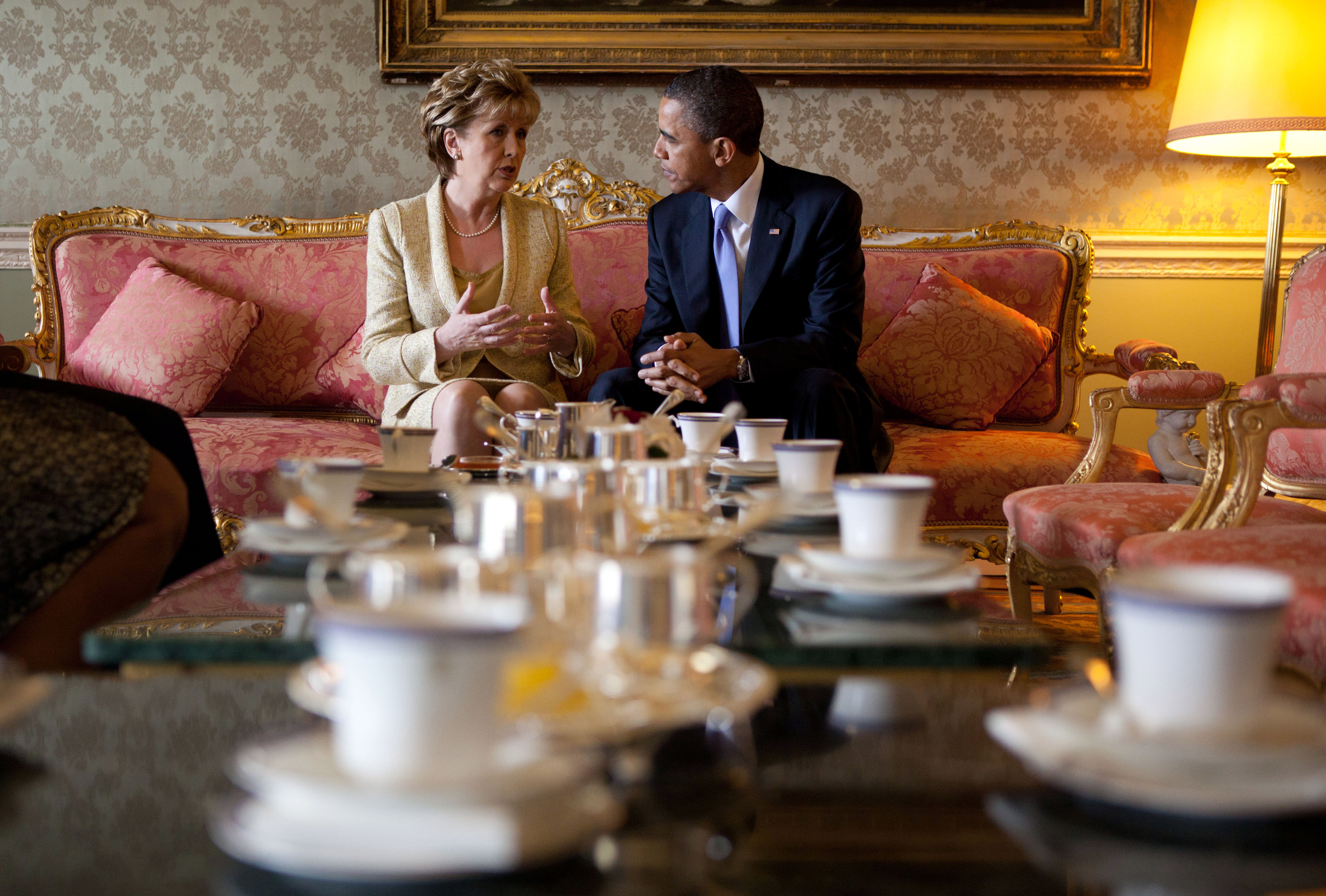
McAleese in discussion with US President Barack Obama at Áras an Uachtaráin on 23 May 2011

=== State visit to Russia ===
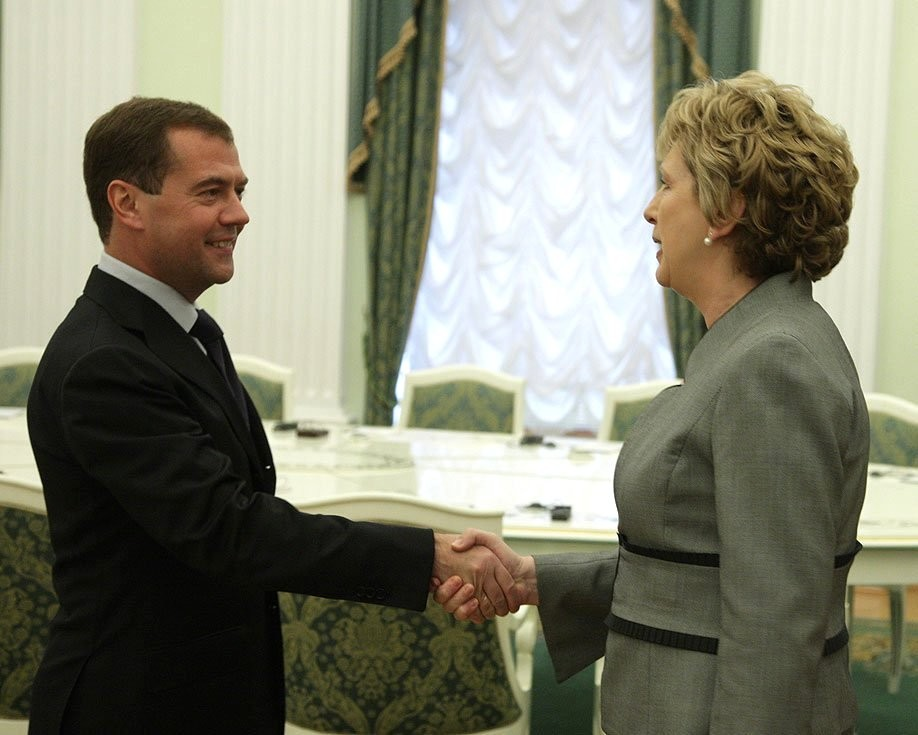
McAleese meets with President of Russia Dmitry Medvedev in 2010

She made an official visit to Russia, with Minister of State, Billy Kelleher, for four days in September 2010, and met with President of Russia Dmitry Medvedev. She spoke kindly of Mikhail Gorbachev, officially invited Medvedev to Ireland, and addressed students at a university in Saint Petersburg. She called for warmer relations between the European Union and Russia. On her state tour to Russia, highlighting the importance of competence, she launched an unprecedented attack on the Central Bank of Ireland, for their role in the financial crisis which resulted in tens of thousands of people in mortgage arrears.

=== Grand Marshal invitation ===
The President turned down an invitation to be grand marshal at the 250th New York City St. Patrick's Day Parade planned for 2011. The parade organisers refused to allow gay people to march under their banner, and there was media speculation that this was the reason for the refusal. A spokesperson for the President's office stated that, while honoured by the invitation, she could not attend because of "scheduling constraints".

=== Elizabeth II's state visit to Ireland ===
In March 2011, President McAleese invited Queen Elizabeth II of the United Kingdom to make a state visit to Ireland. The Queen accepted, and the visit took place from 17 to 20 May 2011, the first state visit by a British monarch since Ireland had gained independence. McAleese had been eager to have the Queen visit Ireland, and the event was widely welcomed as a historic success.

=== Barack Obama's state visit to Ireland ===
In May 2011 McAleese and Taoiseach Enda Kenny hosted US President Barack Obama during a state visit to Ireland. Notable events include McAleese hosting President Obama in Áras an Uachtaráin for a private meeting in the Drawing Room.

=== Reflecting on her presidency ===
In past media interviews, prior to the Queen's visit, President McAleese had stated on several occasions that the highlight of her presidency to date was the opening ceremony of the 2003 Special Olympics World Games, which she describes as "a time when Ireland was at its superb best". While opening the National Ploughing Championships in County Kildare in September 2011, she spoke of her sadness that she would soon no longer be president, saying: "I'm going to miss it terribly … I'll miss the people and the engagement with them".

=== Second visit to Lebanon ===
Mary McAleese made her final overseas visit as head of state to Lebanon in October 2011, the location of her very first official overseas visit in 1997. While there she met with Lebanese President Michel Suleiman. Before her trip to Lebanon she visited Derry, on one of her last official engagements to Northern Ireland, becoming the inaugural speaker at the first Conversations Across Walls and Borders event in First Derry Presbyterian Church. She voluntarily donated more than 60 gifts given to her over the 14 years, and worth about €100,000, to the Irish state.

=== Final days in office ===
On 10 November 2011, one day before she left office, she thanked Ireland for her two terms in an article in The Irish Times. She performed her last official public engagement at a hostel for homeless men in Dublin in the morning and spent the afternoon moving out of Áras an Uachtaráin.

McAleese left office on 11 November 2011; she was succeeded by Michael D. Higgins, who had been elected in the presidential election held on 27 October 2011. Higgins was inaugurated on 11 November 2011, marking the end of McAleese's presidency.

== Council of State ==
=== Meetings ===
No.	Article	Reserve power	Subject	Outcome
1.	1999 meeting	Address to the Oireachtas	The new millennium	Address given
2.	2000 meeting	Referral of bill to the Supreme Court	Planning and Development Bill 1999; Illegal Immigrants (Trafficking) Bill 1999	Sections of both bills referred (Both upheld)
3.	2002 meeting	Referral of bill to the Supreme Court	Housing (Miscellaneous Provisions) (No. 2) Bill 2001	Bill not referred
4.	2004 meeting	Referral of bill to the Supreme Court	Health (Amendment) (No. 2) Bill 2004	Bill referred (Struck down)
5.	2009 meeting	Referral of bill to the Supreme Court	Criminal Justice (Amendment) Bill 2009; Defamation Bill 2006	Bills not referred
6.	2010 meeting	Referral of bill to the Supreme Court	Credit Institutions (Stabilisation) Bill 2010	Signed without referral

=== Presidential appointees ===
First term

- Gordon Brett
- Brian Crowley
- Ruth Curtis
- Christina Carney Flynn
- Stanislaus Kennedy
- Martin Naughton
- Noel Stewart

Second term

- Harvey Bicker
- Anastasia Crickley
- Mary Davis
- Martin Mansergh
- Enda Marren
- Denis Moloney
- Daráine Mulvihill
