= Seal of the president of Ireland =

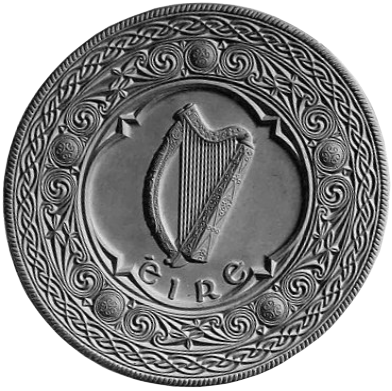
Seal of the president

The presidential seal (Irish: séala an uachtaráin) is a seal used by the president of Ireland to authenticate their signature on official documents. The Constitution of Ireland requires certain documents to be issued under the president's "hand and seal", and in other cases the seal is mandated by act of the Oireachtas. It is a single-sided "dry seal" impressed directly onto the fabric of the document, leaving a relief of its design without sealing wax or ink.

== Design ==
The physical seal is a metal disc about 6 inches (15 cm) in diameter. The image is an Irish harp, with 15 strings, surrounded by a ring of Celtic ornamentation based on that on the base of the Ardagh Chalice. Within the ring is the word Éire ("Ireland", the name of the state in Irish) in Gaelic type. The design was approved by the Executive Council of the Irish Free State on 15 September 1937, in preparation for the adoption of the current constitution on 29 December 1937. The harp is modelled on the 1928 design by Percy Metcalfe for the obverse of the Free State coinage, itself based on the "Brian Ború harp", also used on the 1945 coat of arms of Ireland. The design is similar to that of the seal which it replaced, the Internal Great Seal of the Irish Free State; the most obvious difference being in the name of the state (previously Saorstát Éireann). However, the Free State seal was used with sealing wax. In 1949 John Aloysius Belton of the Department of External Affairs suggested changes to the seal's design to reflect its new diplomatic uses under the Republic of Ireland Act, but no change was made.

== Use ==
External images
- Document stamped with the Seal of the President giving notice of his 2020 government appointments on the advice of the Taoiseach.
- Presentation of the Seal by Chief Justice Frank Clarke to President Michael D. Higgins at his 2018 inauguration.

The seal remains in the custody of the current president or, in their absence, the Presidential Commission. In the latter case, sealed documents must be signed by at least two members of the commission and the secretary-general to the president. At the inauguration of a new president, the chief justice presents the seal to them.

The 1937 Constitution of Ireland created the office of President of Ireland and defines most of its powers. It specifies several situations in which the president must send a message "under his hand and seal":

- notifying the Oireachtas (parliament) of agreeing or refusing to an ordinary referendum
- appointing or dismissing discretionary members of the Council of State
- dismissing (after impeachment) the Comptroller and Auditor General or a judge

It specifies other cases where his signature is required:

- signing bills into law
- signing an enrolled text of the Constitution

While not always explicitly required by the Constitution, in practice each exercise of their official functions is accompanied by a signed and sealed document. For example, while Article 13.1.1° does not specify the manner in which the president appoints a nominated Taoiseach, the practice includes signing and sealing a warrant. The Presidential Seal Act 1937 states that the presence of the seal authenticates the president's signature on any "order, commission, warrant, or other instrument". It also states that "the presidential seal shall be affixed to instruments made by the President, and to no other instruments, and shall be so affixed by direction of the President and not otherwise". The Defence Act 1954 specifies that officers' commissions into the Defence Forces must carry the seal. The office of the president maintains registers of bills, diplomatic documents, and other "Executed Documents" to which the seal has been applied, older volumes of which are in file PRES 3 of the National Archives of Ireland.

Since the coming into force in 1949 of The Republic of Ireland Act 1948, the president has authority to sign and seal important treaties and diplomatic credentials. Before 1949, the Executive Authority (External Relations) Act 1936 provided that the diplomatic functions of Irish head of state were performed by the British monarch, who signed such documents and sealed them with the External Great Seal. Before and after 1949, practically all diplomatic documents have in fact been signed by the Minister for Foreign Affairs and sealed with his ministerial seal. The presidential seal has only been used for Full Powers instruments relating to the Treaties of the European Union.

== See also ==
- Coat of arms of Ireland
