= Enda Marren =

Irish politician and lawyer

Enda Marren (10 December 1934 – 8 March 2013) was a solicitor and a former member of the Irish Council of State.

== Early life and education ==
Marren was born in Killasser, Swinford, County Mayo, the son of Patrick Marren and Eileen Horkan. After a primary education at Knocks National School, where his parents were his teachers, he went to Rockwell College near Cashel, County Tipperary. He was a member of the Munster Schools Senior Cup-winning team in 1953. He attended University College Dublin, where he graduated with a BA and LL.B degrees before qualifying as a lawyer and being admitted to the Role of Solicitors at the Incorporated Law Society in 1958. The same year, he founded Martin E. Marren & Co., Solicitors and served as senior partner in the firm until 1996, when he was succeeded by his son, Paul.

== Career ==
Marren became involved with the Fine Gael party in Dublin during the 1960s, becoming a member of the National Executive. When Garret FitzGerald became leader of Fine Gael in 1977, he initiated a major modernisation programme. Marren became one of his close advisors and, together with Ted Nealon, Bill O'Herlihy, Pat Heneghan and Frank Flannery, brought flair, organisational skills and professionalism to the party. They became known as 'the National Handlers', a name given to them by Mayo-born journalist John Healy.

Over the years, Marren served on the boards of many public and private bodies. He served on the first Law Reform Commission (1975–80); The National Film Studios of Ireland (Ardmore Studios); The Rehab Group; Bord Gáis (now Ervia); Aer Lingus; Bord Failte; the Garda Síochána Complaints Appeal Board and as chairman of the Army Pensions Board. He was also one of the founders of the Irish Committee of UNICEF and served as chairman for a number of years.

In 2004, Marren was appointed to the Irish Council of State by the President of Ireland, Mary McAleese, and served until 2011. He also served as chairman (1965–66) and president (1975–77) of the Mayo association in Dublin.

== Personal life ==
Marren was married to Nuala, née Craig, and had five children. He died on 8 March 2013.
