= Ebun Joseph =

Nigerian lecturer, author, and consultant

Ebun Joseph Arogundade
- Born: 1970 (age 55–56); Nigeria
- Citizenship: Nigerian
- Education: University of Benin (Nigeria); Maynooth University; University College Dublin
- Children: 2

Ebun Joseph (born 1970) is a Nigerian lecturer, author, and consultant. She is founder and module coordinator of the first Black Studies module in Ireland at University College Dublin.

== Career ==
Ebun Joseph first trained as a microbiologist at the University of Benin. She went on to work as the Administrative Secretary for the Nigerian Britain Association before emigrating to Ireland in 2002. She received a master's degree in education, Adult Guidance and Counselling from Maynooth University. She was awarded a PhD in Equality Studies from the UCD School of Social Justice, and has lectured in Trinity College Dublin and University College Dublin (UCD). Joseph is a lecturer on social policy, equality, migration and race at UCD. She is the coordinator of the first Black Studies module in Ireland at UCD, which she established with Prof Kathleen Lynch in 2019 and director of the Institute of Antiracism and Black Studies. She is also a career-development specialist. Joseph is a career development consultant with the Royal College of Surgeons in Ireland and a race relations consultant. She teaches diversity training courses.

Joseph is the chairperson and founder of the African Scholars Association Ireland (AfSAI). She also founded The Unforgettable Women’s Network (TUWN) and is a founding member of the African Women Writers Ireland. She is a columnist for the African Voice newspaper. Joseph has spoken about her experiences of racism in Ireland as well as highlighting the prejudices that other minorities, such as the Travelling community, can face.

She is an advocate for the ending of direct provision, and has argued for the Black Lives Matter movement in Ireland. In 2020, in light of protests and increased coverage of racism in Ireland, Joseph spoke about the importance of education about tackling racism that begins in the home as well as outlining more personal strategies for countering everyday racism. She said there is a need to overhaul the Irish education system to also incorporate anti-racist material into the curriculum, and that there is a need for more diversity within teaching staff. She has highlighted stories from young black Irish people about the racism they experienced in schools. She has spoken about her own experiences of racism in Ireland, including the use of a racist parody Twitter account pretending to be her. Joseph has convened a number of virtual town hall meetings, bringing together black academics, writers and others to talk about issues relating to racism in Ireland. She has also commented on the effect of the COVID-19 pandemic on Irish workers who are black or people of colour.

In 2020, Joseph supported the Shelbourne Hotel's decision to remove four statues of African women, which were claimed to depict African slaves, from outside their hotel. Joseph stated that the black community were likely unaware of the statue's existence at the front of the hotel, suggesting that some members of the black community may not frequent such hotels. She has also commented on the international movement to remove statues which commemorate those who engaged in or profited from the slave trade. In September 2020 art historian Professor Paula Murphy, an expert on sculpture, concluded that the Shelbourne statues are not depictions of slaves after being commissioned to examine them.

== Personal life ==
Ebun Joseph was born in Benin City, Nigeria in 1970 to Joseph and Grace Arogundade. She has six siblings. Her father is from Okpe was a politician,She has two sons, and lives in Dublin. She holds both Nigerian and Irish citizenship.

== Selected publications ==
- Critical race theory and inequality in the labour market. Racial stratification in Ireland (2020) ISBN 978-1-5261-3439-4
- Becoming Unforgettable. Uncovering the Essence of the Woman (2012)
- Trapped: Prison without Walls (2013)
- The centrality of race and whiteness in the Irish labour market Irish Network Against Racism
- Composite counterstorytelling as a technique for challenging ambivalence about race and racism in the labour market in Ireland. Irish Journal of Sociology. (2020) https://doi.org/10.1177/0791603520937274
- Discrimination against credentials in Black bodies: counterstories of the characteristic labour market experiences of migrants in Ireland, British Journal of Guidance & Counselling, (2019) 47:4, 524–542, DOI: 10.1080/03069885.2019.1620916
- Whiteness and racism: Examining the racial order in Ireland. Irish Journal of Sociology, (2018) 26(1), 46–70. https://doi.org/10.1177/0791603517737282
