= Kathleen Lynch (academic) =

Irish sociologist, academic, activist and professor

Council of State
- Incumbent
- Assumed office 31 March 2026
- Appointed by: Catherine Connolly

Personal details
- Born: 1951 (age 74–75) County Clare, Ireland
- Spouse: John Lynch
- Education: University College Dublin
- Occupation: Sociologist
- Website: people.ucd.ie/kathleen.lynch

Kathleen Lynch (born 1951) is an Irish sociologist, activist and professor emeritus of equality studies at University College Dublin, who has served on the Irish Council of State since 2026.

== Career ==
Lynch began her career as a social worker, working in North Dublin city. Her seminal work is a co-authored study with Anne Lodge, Equality and Power in Schools: Redistribution, Recognition, and Representation. It was a two-year study of twelve Irish schools, studying all aspects from streaming to sexual orientation. Lynch was involved in the establishment of the Equality Studies Centre in University College Dublin (UCD) in 1990. In 2005, she was involved in the creation of the UCD School of Social Justice. Her 2009 book, Affective Equality: Love Care and Injustice, was named one of Ireland's 100 best books by readers of The Irish Times.

With Ebun Joseph, Lynch co-founded the first Black Studies module in Ireland in 2018 at UCD. She helped in the establishment of the Egalitarian World Initiative Network (EWI), chairing the group, and led the EWI Marie Curie Transfer of Knowledge Award from 2006 to 2010.

Lynch was presented with a special award by the Irish Research Council in 2019 for her contributions to equality and participation studies. In 2020, Lynch was amongst a number of UCD academics who spoke out against proposed changes to its academic freedom policy. She was appointed as one of the commissioners to Irish Human Rights and Equality Commission in 2020.

Outside of her academic work, Lynch has worked with a number of non-governmental organisations and statutory bodies, both in Ireland and internationally, focusing on improving social justice and challenging inequalities. She consulted on the Commission on the Status of People With Disabilities report in the 1990s. She is a regular contributor to Irish television and radio speaking about issues of equality. In March 2026, she was appointed to the Irish Council of State by President Catherine Connolly.

== Personal life ==
Lynch was born in County Clare. She is married to John Lynch.

== Selected publications ==
- Lynch, Kathleen; Lodge, Anne (2002). Equality and power in schools: redistribution, recognition, and representation. London New York: RoutledgeFalmer. ISBN 978-0-415-26806-6.
- Baker, John; Lynch, K.; Cantillon, Sara; Walsh, Judy (23 May 2016). Equality. London: Springer. ISBN 978-0-230-25041-3.
- Lynch, K.; Baker, J.; Lyons, M.; Feeley, Maggie; Hanlon, Niall; O'Brien, Maeve; Walsh, Judy; Cantillon, Sara (30 April 2016). Affective Equality. Houndmills, Basingstoke New York: Springer. ISBN 978-0-230-24508-2.
- Lynch, Kathleen; Grummell, Bernie; Devine, D. (7 June 2012). New Managerialism in Education. Basingstoke: Springer. ISBN 978-1-137-00723-0.
- Lynch, Kathleen (9 December 2021). Care and Capitalism. Cambridge, UK Medford, MA: John Wiley & Sons. ISBN 978-1-5095-4385-4.
