= Secretary-General to the President (Ireland) =

Position in the Republic of Ireland

The Secretary-General to the President is the senior Irish civil servant who fulfils four distinct roles in relation to the office of the President of Ireland. The current incumbent is Orla O'Hanrahan who was appointed in May 2021.

== Overview ==
The Office was established by the Presidential Establishment Act, 1938. Under this Act, and subsequent legislation, the Secretary General is:

- Head of the Office of the President
- Chief advisor to the President on all matters to do with their powers, functions and duties
- Secretary to the Presidential Commission, the collective vice-presidency of Ireland
- Clerk to the advisory Council of State

The Secretary General's signature is essential for the authentication of the Presidential Seal when affixed to a document executed by the Commission under Seal.

Under the Presidential Elections (Amendment) Act, 1946 the Secretary General to the President is one of a group of senior state officials, including the outgoing president, the Taoiseach and the chairs of both houses of the Oireachtas, who must be formally notified of the election of a new president by the Returning Officer.

== Creation of the office ==
The coming into force of the new Irish constitution, in December 1937 resulted in the creation of a new office, President of Ireland. While the office was not scheduled to be filled until mid 1938 its powers, functions and duties were required to be exercised immediately. That role was given to the new collective vice-presidency, which under the transitory provisions of the constitution was made up of the Ceann Comhairle of Dáil Éireann, the Chief Justice and the President of the High Court. (The latter fulfilled the role that would normally be exercised by the Cathaoirleach of Seanad Éireann. However the election to the new upper house had yet to take place, so there was no Cathaoirleach.)

The Government immediately appointed as Secretary to the President, as the post was then called, Michael McDunphy, a controversial, outspoken and temperamental civil servant who had prior to his appointment been Assistant Secretary to the Executive Council, and had once been Secretary to the Provisional Governments of Michael Collins and W. T. Cosgrave (January–December 1922) McDunphy, like the Presidential Commission, was originally based in Dublin Castle until a new presidential residence was chosen. He moved into the new Áras an Uachtaráin (formerly the Viceregal Lodge) in June 1938.

== Impact of McDunphy ==
McDunphy's proposed design for the Presidential Standard (1944). The four swans are taken from the prominent Irish legend of The Children of Lir.

McDunphy proved to be a difficult and complex Secretary to the President. A passionate believer in structure, he spent his period in office creating numerous rules and regulations. While the first president, the politically inexperienced Douglas Hyde accepted his rules automatically, his successor, the more politically experienced former Tánaiste, Seán T. O'Kelly, who became president in June 1945, had a more fraught relationship with McDunphy and frequently baulked at following McDunphy's rules.

McDunphy had a long-term impact on the presidency. His 1945 book The President of Ireland: His Powers, Functions & Duties was seen as the bible of the office by those seeking to restrict the post and its occupant. His restrictions, which were viewed as correct (or, if not correct, useful in enabling them to control and restrict presidents) by later civil servants, led President Erskine Childers to accuse one later Secretary to the President of having "the ghost of McDunphy behind you." Mary Robinson as president ditched all of McDunphy's rules and in effect started from scratch. Commentators credited the ditching of McDunphy's rules as a key factor in the rebirth of the office and in its subsequent popularity.

== Government department ==
The Secretary General to the President is attached to the Department of the Taoiseach. In practice the secretary general is treated as being a full department head. McDunphy however accused the Secretary to the Government and Secretary to the Taoiseach, Maurice Moynihan of plotting to undermine him and take over control of the Office of the President, a claim Moynihan ridiculed in papers now available in the National Archives of Ireland.

== Change of name ==
In the 1990s, the title of chief civil servant in the Irish government was changed from Secretary to the Department to Secretary-General to the Department. The post of Secretary to the President however was left unchanged because the Office of the President was not technically a department. In 2004 a Bill was introduced into the Oireachtas to change the title from Secretary to the President to Secretary-General to the President. The name change came into force in 2005.

== Secretaries-General to the President ==
Name	Term of office
Michael McDunphy	1937–1954
Daniel J. O'Donovan	1954–1959
Mairtín Ó Flathartaigh	1959–1978
Michéal Ó hÓdhráin	1978–1990
Peter Ryan	1990–1997
Brian McCarthy	1997–2007
Tim O'Connor	2007–2010
Adrian O'Neill	2010–2014
Art O'Leary	2014–2021
Orla O'Hanrahan	2021–present
