= Denis Moloney =

Northern Irish lawyer

Denis Moloney is a solicitor and notary public from Belfast, Northern Ireland. He served as a member of the Council of State in the Republic of Ireland from 2004 to 2011.

== Education ==
Moloney was educated at St Malachy's College and Queen's University Belfast. He received an Honorary Doctorate in Laws from the University of Ulster in 2010.

== Career ==
Moloney is a partner at Donnelly & Wall, a Belfast-based law firm specialising in criminal law. He has held various roles, including:

- Vice-Chair of St Louise's College, Belfast
- Member of the Probation Board for Northern Ireland
- Emeritus Professor of Law at the University of Ulster
- Member of the Council of State (Ireland) (appointed by President Mary McAleese in 2004)
