= Irish presidential inauguration =

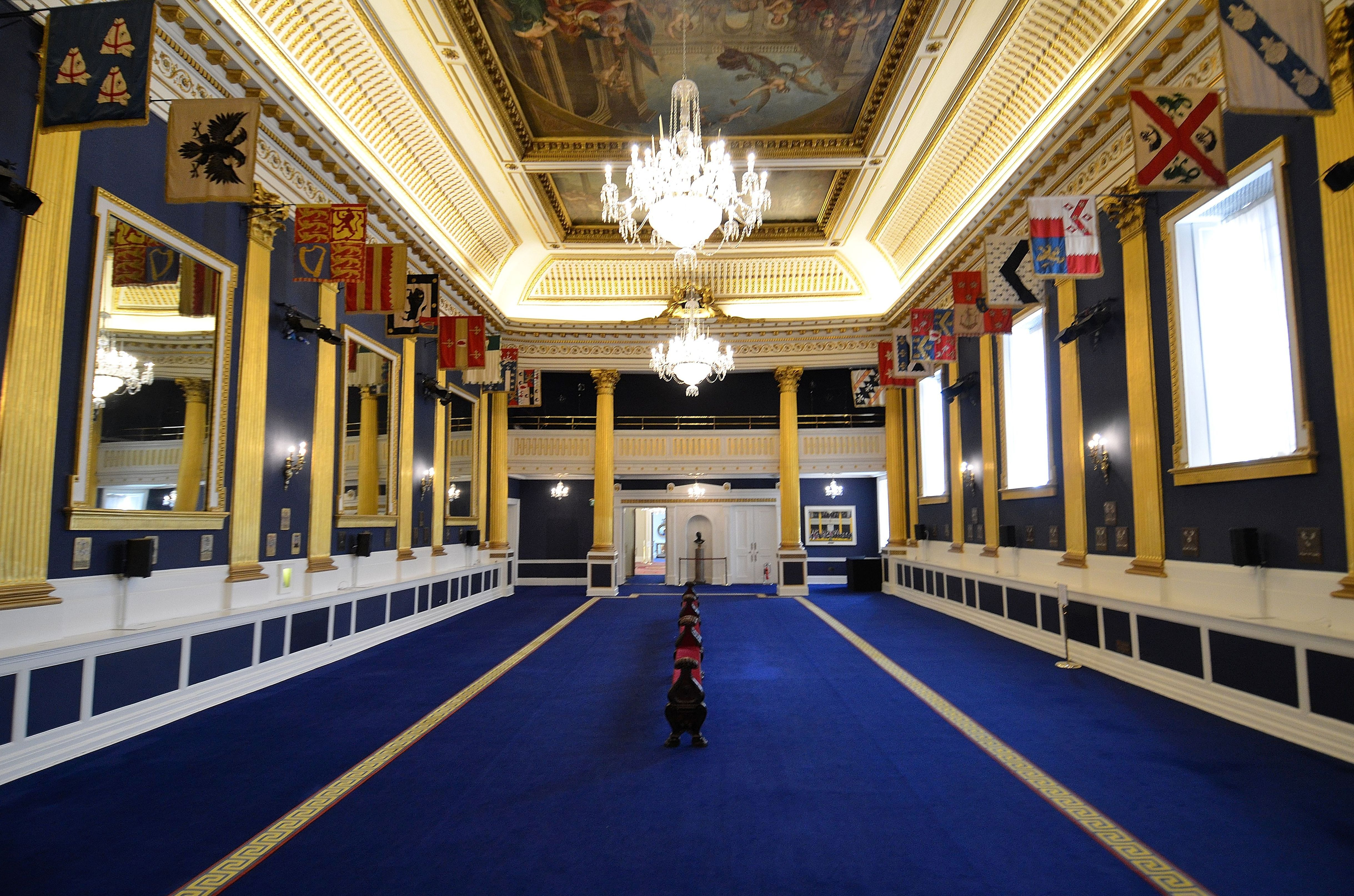
Saint Patrick's Hall, where presidents are inaugurated.

The inauguration of the president of Ireland is a ceremony to mark the commencement of a new seven-year term of the president of Ireland. The inauguration takes place on the day following the expiry of the preceding term. No location is specified in the constitution, but all inaugurations have taken place in Saint Patrick's Hall in the State Apartments in Dublin Castle. The ceremony is transmitted live by national broadcaster RTÉ on its principal television and radio channels, typically from around 11 am. To highlight the significance of the event, all key figures in the executive (the government of Ireland), the legislature (Oireachtas) and the judiciary attend, as do members of the diplomatic corps and other guests.

During the period of the Irish Free State (1922 to 1937), the governor-general had been installed into office as the representative of the Crown in a low-key ceremony, twice in Leinster House (the seat of the Oireachtas), but in the case of the last governor-general, Domhnall Ua Buachalla, in his brother's drawing room. By contrast, the Constitution of Ireland adopted in 1937 requires the president's oath of office to be taken in public.

Subsequent to the election of Catherine Connolly, the most recent inauguration was held on 11 November 2025.

== Oath of Office ==
Under the Constitution, in assuming office the president must subscribe to a formal declaration, made publicly and in the presence of members of both Houses of the Oireachtas, judges of the Supreme Court and the High Court, and other "public personages". The inauguration of the president takes place in St Patrick's Hall in Dublin Castle. The declaration is specified in Article 12.8:

I láthair Dia na nUilechumhacht, táimse, [ainm], á ghealladh agus á dhearbhú go sollúnta is go fírinneach bheith i mo thaca agus i mo dhídin do Bhunreacht Éireann, agus a dlíthe a chaomhnú, mo dhualgais a chomhlíonadh go dílis coinsiasach de réir an Bhunreachta is an dlí, agus mo lándícheall a dhéanamh ar son leasa is fónaimh mhuintir na hÉireann. Dia do mo stiúradh agus do mo chumhdach.

In the presence of Almighty God I, [name], do solemnly and sincerely promise and declare that I will maintain the Constitution of Ireland and uphold its laws, that I will fulfil my duties faithfully and conscientiously in accordance with the Constitution and the law, and that I will dedicate my abilities to the service and welfare of the people of Ireland. May God direct and sustain me.

To date, every president has subscribed to the declaration in Irish. Erskine H. Childers, who never learnt Irish and spoke with a distinctive Oxbridge accent that made pronouncing Irish quite difficult, opted with some reluctance for the Irish version in 1973. Pictures of the event show Childers reading from an exceptionally large board where it had been written down phonetically for him. At his second inauguration in 2018, Michael D. Higgins first made the declaration in Irish, then repeated it in English.

Following the oath, presidents will sign a written copy of the declaration, upon the completion of which they are said to have officially taken office. After a brief fanfare, including the raising of the presidential standard over Dublin Castle and a 21-gun salute, the president is presented with the presidential seal by the Chief Justice of Ireland, which is used to authenticate documents signed by the president.

== Presidential address ==
Having taken the Declaration of Office, the new president traditionally delivers an address to the guests. Constitutionally all addresses or messages to 'the Nation' or to 'the Oireachtas' are supposed to have prior government approval. Some lawyers have questioned whether the speech at the inauguration should fall into the category requiring government approval. However, as it is impractical to get approval given that the new president is only president for a matter of moments before delivering the speech and so has not had time to submit it, any constitutional questions as to its status are ignored.

== Religious and humanist involvement ==
Inauguration Day involves a lot of rituals and ceremonial. Until 1983 the morning saw the president-elect, accompanied by their spouse, escorted by the Presidential Motorcycle Escort to one of Dublin's cathedrals. If they were Catholic they were brought to St Mary's Pro-Cathedral for a Pontifical High Mass. If they were Church of Ireland, they were brought to St Patrick's Cathedral for a Divine Service. In the 1970s instead of separate denominational ceremonies a single ecumenical multi-faith service was held in the cathedral of the faith of the president-elect. Some additional religious ceremonies also featured: President-elect Cearbhall Ó Dálaigh attended a prayer ceremony in a synagogue in Dublin to reflect his longstanding relationship with the Jewish Community in Ireland.

In 1983, to reduce the costs of the day in a period of economic retrenchment, the separate religious blessing ceremony was incorporated into the inauguration ceremony itself, with the president-elect blessed by representatives of the Roman Catholic Church, the Church of Ireland, the Presbyterian Church, Methodism, the Society of Friends, and the Jewish and Islamic faiths. This inter-faith service has been featured in the inaugurations since 1983. Since 2011, a representative from the Humanist Association of Ireland, representing humanism and the non-religious population of Ireland, has appeared alongside ministers of religion.

== Dress codes ==
For the first inauguration in 1938 President-elect Douglas Hyde wore a morning suit, with black silk top hat. Morning suits continued to be a standard feature of Irish presidential inaugurations until 1997 when Mary McAleese, whose husband disliked wearing formal suits, abolished their use for inaugurations (and for all other presidential ceremonial). From then, guests were required to wear plain business suits, and judges were prohibited from wearing their distinctive wigs and gowns. Ambassadors were also discouraged from wearing national dress.

== End of the day ==
The president-elect (unless they are already a serving president, in which case they will already be living in the presidential residence) are usually driven to the inauguration from their private home. After the ceremony they are driven through the streets of Dublin to Áras an Uachtaráin, the official presidential residence, where they are welcomed by the secretary-general to the president, the head of the presidential secretariat.

That evening, the Irish government hosts a reception in their honour in the State Apartments (the former Royal Apartments) in Dublin Castle. Whereas the dress code was formerly white tie affair, it is now more usually black tie.

== List of inauguration ceremonies ==
The inauguration ceremonies marking the start of a new seven-year presidential term of office and also the two marking the start of early presidential elections following the intra-term death or resignation of an incumbent president are listed in the table below.

No.	Date	President	Event	Location	Oath administered by	Notes
1st	25 June 1938 (Saturday)	Douglas Hyde	Inauguration of Douglas Hyde	Saint Patrick's Hall, Dublin	Timothy Sullivan	Although the Irish Free State was abolished following the adoption of a new constitution on 29 December 1937, the office of the President of Ireland was established on 25 June 1938. But Hyde's leadership would be disputed by King George VI. Although the 1937 Constitution of Ireland did not mention that the king or the president was the Irish head of state
2nd	25 June 1945 (Monday)	Seán T. O'Kelly	First inauguration of Seán T. O'Kelly	Saint Patrick's Hall, Dublin	Timothy Sullivan	His leadership was disputed by King George VI until the official signing of The Republic of Ireland Act 1948 on 18 April 1949, honouring the 33rd anniversary of the Easter Rising. This officially abolished the monarchy and made the president the Irish head of state
3rd	25 June 1952 (Wednesday)	Seán T. O'Kelly	Second inauguration of Seán T. O'Kelly	Saint Patrick's Hall, Dublin	Conor Maguire	
4th	25 June 1959 (Thursday)	Éamon de Valera	First inauguration of Éamon de Valera	Saint Patrick's Hall, Dublin	Conor Maguire	
5th	25 June 1966 (Saturday)	Éamon de Valera	Second inauguration of Éamon de Valera	Saint Patrick's Hall, Dublin	Cearbhall Ó Dálaigh	
6th	25 June 1973 (Monday)	Erskine H. Childers	Inauguration of Erskine H. Childers	Saint Patrick's Hall, Dublin	Cearbhall Ó Dálaigh	Died in office on 17 November 1974
7th	19 December 1974 (Thursday)	Cearbhall Ó Dálaigh	Inauguration of Cearbhall Ó Dálaigh	Saint Patrick's Hall, Dublin	Tom O'Higgins	Resigned as president on 22 October 1976
8th	3 December 1976 (Friday)	Patrick Hillery	First inauguration of Patrick Hillery	Saint Patrick's Hall, Dublin	Tom O'Higgins	
9th	3 December 1983 (Saturday)	Patrick Hillery	Second inauguration of Patrick Hillery	Saint Patrick's Hall, Dublin	Tom O'Higgins	
10th	3 December 1990 (Monday)	Mary Robinson	Inauguration of Mary Robinson	Saint Patrick's Hall, Dublin	Thomas Finlay	Resigned as president on 12 September 1997
11th	11 November 1997 (Tuesday)	Mary McAleese	First inauguration of Mary McAleese	Saint Patrick's Hall, Dublin	Liam Hamilton	
12th	11 November 2004 (Thursday)	Mary McAleese	Second inauguration of Mary McAleese	Saint Patrick's Hall, Dublin	John Murray	
13th	11 November 2011 (Friday)	Michael D. Higgins	First inauguration of Michael D. Higgins	Saint Patrick's Hall, Dublin	Susan Denham	
14th	11 November 2018 (Sunday)	Michael D. Higgins	Second inauguration of Michael D. Higgins	Saint Patrick's Hall, Dublin	Frank Clarke	
15th	11 November 2025 (Tuesday)	Catherine Connolly	Inauguration of Catherine Connolly	Saint Patrick's Hall, Dublin	Donal O'Donnell	
