= President of Ireland =

Head of state

- Uachtarán na hÉireann (Irish)
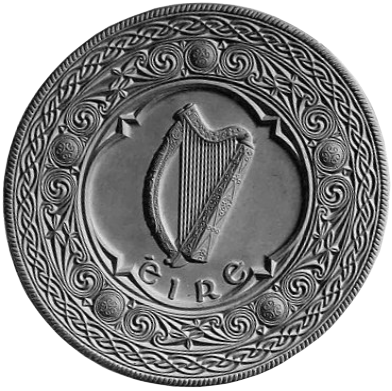
- Presidential Seal

- Presidential Standard

- Incumbent; Catherine Connolly since 11 November 2025
- Office of the President
- Style: President (A Uachtaráin) or Your Excellency (A Shoilse)
- Status: Head of State; Commander-in-chief
- Residence: Áras an Uachtaráin
- Seat: Dublin, Ireland
- Nominator: Members of the Oireachtas or local councils
- Appointer: Direct popular vote by Instant-runoff voting
- Term length: Seven years, renewable once
- Constituting instrument: Constitution of Ireland (1937) Articles 12−14
- Precursor: Governor-General of the Irish Free State; King of the Irish Free State
- Inaugural holder: Douglas Hyde
- Formation: 25 June 1938; 88 years ago
- Salary: €249,014 annually
- Website: president.ie/en

The president of Ireland (Irish: Uachtarán na hÉireann) is the head of state of Ireland and the supreme commander of the Irish Defence Forces. The presidency was established by the Constitution of Ireland in 1937. The first president assumed office in 1938, and became recognised internationally as head of state in 1949 after the coming into effect of the Republic of Ireland Act. The president's official residence and principal workplace is Áras an Uachtaráin in Phoenix Park, Dublin.

The presidency is a predominantly ceremonial institution, serving as the representative of the Irish state both at home and abroad. Nevertheless, the office of president is endowed with certain powers which have constitutional importance. While Éamon de Valera described his intentions for the office as being "mainly to guard the Constitution", such a description is deprecated by some academics, with the leading constitutional text noting "the Constitution is extremely sparing in its attribution of any independent functions to the office at all". Be that as it may, both the Office of the President and the wider legal community in Ireland recognise the president as a "protector of the rights of citizens" and the "guardian of the constitution". This interpretation of the president's role is in keeping with their solemn oath to "maintain the Constitution of Ireland and uphold its laws".

Presidents hold office for seven years, and may serve a maximum of two terms. The president is elected directly by the people, although there is no poll if only one candidate is nominated, which has occurred on six occasions, most recently in 2004. The incumbent president is Catherine Connolly, who has served since her inauguration on 11 November 2025, having won the 2025 Irish presidential election. She is the tenth person to hold the office, as well as the third woman, following the successive tenures of Mary Robinson and Mary McAleese.

== History ==
The office of president was established in 1937, in part as a replacement for the office of governor-general that existed during the 1922–1937 Irish Free State. The seven-year term of office of the president was inspired by that of the presidents of Weimar Germany. At the time the office was established critics warned that the post might lead to the emergence of a dictatorship. However, these fears were not borne out as successive presidents played a limited, largely apolitical role in national affairs.

=== Head of state from 1937 to 1949 ===
During the period of 1937 to 1949 it was unclear whether the Irish head of state was actually the president of Ireland or George VI, the king of Ireland. This period of confusion ended in 1949 when the state was declared to be a republic. The 1937 constitution did not mention the king, but neither did it state that the president was head of state, saying rather that the president "shall take precedence over all other persons in the State". The president exercised some powers that could be exercised by heads of state but which could also be exercised by governors or governors-general, such as appointing the government and promulgating the law.

However, upon his accession to the throne in 1936, George VI had been proclaimed, as previous monarchs had been, "King of Ireland" and, under the External Relations Act of the same year, it was this king who represented the state in its foreign affairs. Treaties, therefore, were signed in the name of the King of Ireland, who also accredited ambassadors and received the letters of credence of foreign diplomats. This role meant, in any case, that George VI was the Irish head of state in the eyes of foreign nations. The Republic of Ireland Act 1948, which came into force in April 1949, proclaimed a republic and transferred the role of representing the state abroad from the monarch to the president. No change was made to the constitution.

According to Desmond Oulton (owner of Clontarf Castle), his father John George Oulton had suggested to Éamon de Valera towards the end of the Irish Free State, that Ireland should have its own king again, as it was in the times of Gaelic Ireland. He suggested to him, a member of the O'Brien Clan, descended in the paternal line from Brian Boru, a previous High King of Ireland: the most senior representative at the time was Donough O'Brien, 16th Baron Inchiquin. Oulton said that Donough's nephew Conor O'Brien, 18th Baron Inchiquin, confirmed that De Valera did offer Donough O'Brien the title of Prince-President of the Irish Republic, but this was turned down and so a President of Ireland was instituted instead.

=== Evolving role ===
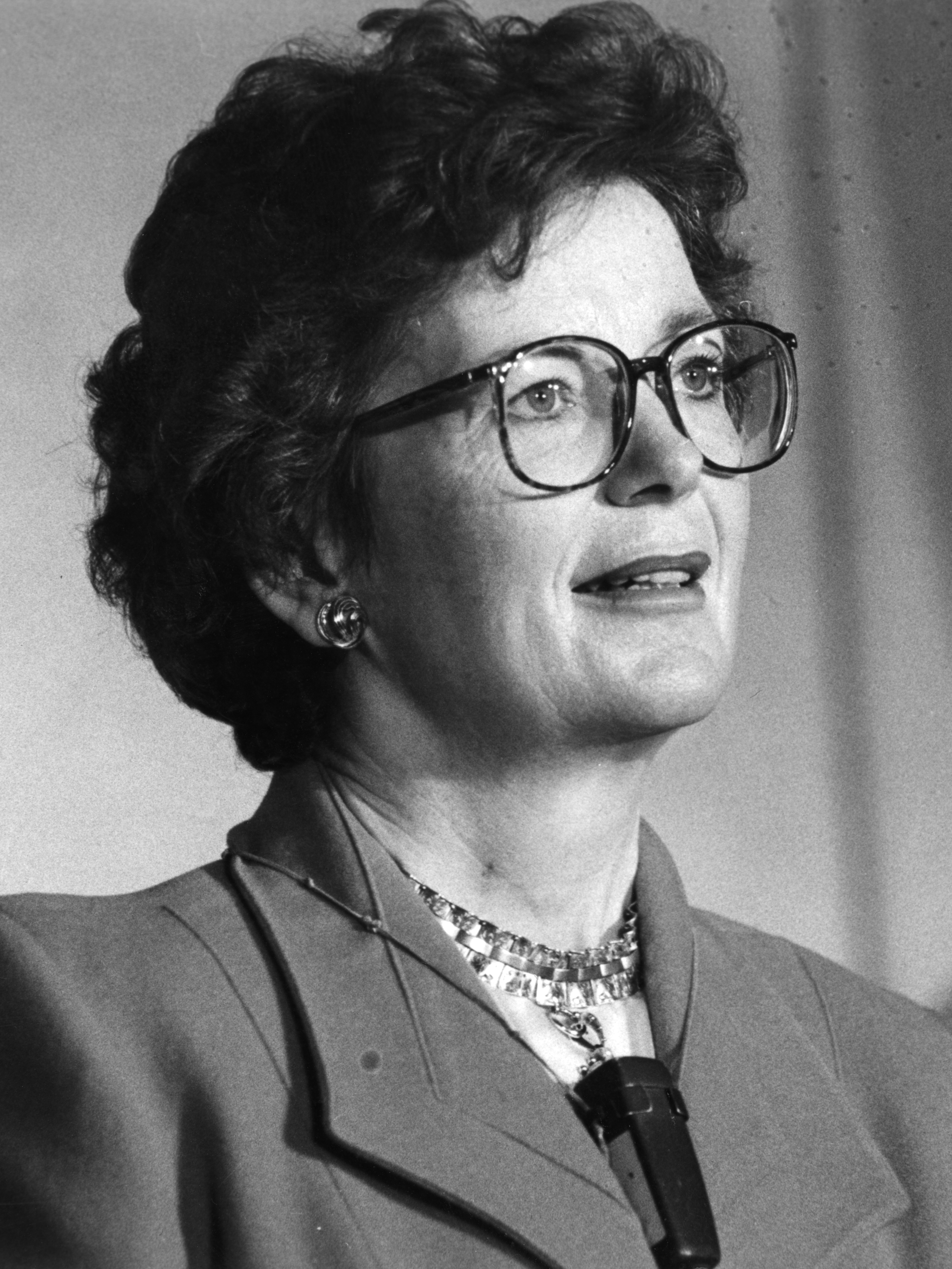
President Mary Robinson (1990–1997) is credited with "revolutionising" the role of the president

After the inaugural presidency of Douglas Hyde, who was an interparty nominee for the office, the nominees of the Fianna Fáil political party won every presidential election until 1990. The party traditionally used the nomination as a reward for its most senior and prominent members, such as party founder and longtime Taoiseach Éamon de Valera and European Commissioner Patrick Hillery. Most of its occupants to that time followed Hyde's precedent-setting conception of the presidency as a conservative, low-key institution that used its ceremonial prestige and few discretionary powers sparingly. In fact, the presidency was such a quiet position that Irish politicians sought to avoid contested presidential elections as often as possible, feeling that the attention such elections would bring to the office was an unnecessary distraction, and office-seekers facing economic austerity would often suggest the elimination of the office as a money-saving measure.

Despite the historical meekness of the presidency, however, it has been at the centre of some high-profile controversies. In particular, the fifth president, Cearbhall Ó Dálaigh, faced a contentious dispute with the government in 1976 over the signing of a bill declaring a state of emergency, which ended in Ó Dálaigh's resignation. His successor, Patrick Hillery, was also involved in a controversy in 1982, when then-Taoiseach Garret FitzGerald requested a dissolution of the Dáil Éireann. Hillery was bombarded with phone calls from opposition members urging him to refuse the request, an action that Hillery saw as highly inappropriate interference with the president's constitutional role and resisted the political pressure.

The presidency began to be transformed in the 1990s. Hillery's conduct regarding the dissolution affair in 1982 came to light in 1990, imbuing the office with a new sense of dignity and stability. However, it was Hillery's successor, seventh president Mary Robinson, who ultimately revolutionised the presidency. The winner of an upset victory in the highly controversial election of 1990, Robinson was the Labour nominee, the first president to defeat Fianna Fáil in an election and the first female president. Upon election, however, Robinson took steps to de-politicise the office. She also sought to widen the scope of the presidency, developing new economic, political and cultural links between the state and other countries and cultures, especially those of the Irish diaspora. Robinson used the prestige of the office to activist ends, placing emphasis during her presidency on the needs of developing countries, linking the history of the Great Irish Famine to today's nutrition, poverty and policy issues, attempting to create a bridge of partnership between developed and developing countries. Since 2019, the president has attended annual meetings of the Arraiolos Group of European non-executive presidents.

== Mode of selection and term of office ==
=== Election ===
The president is directly elected by secret ballot using the instant-runoff voting, the single-winner analogue of the single transferable vote. (Note: While Article 12.2.3° specifies "proportional representation by means of the single transferable vote", the Constitution Review Group and the All-Party Oireachtas Committee both recommend deleting "proportional representation", which does not apply to a single-winner election.) Under the Presidential Elections Act, 1993 a candidate's election formally takes place in the form of a 'declaration' by the returning officer. Where more than one candidate is nominated, the election is 'adjourned' so that a ballot can take place, allowing the electors to choose between candidates. A presidential election is held in time for the winner to take office the day after the end of the incumbent's seven-year term. In the event of premature vacancy, an election must be held within sixty days.

Only resident Irish citizens aged eighteen or more may vote; a 1983 bill to extend the right to resident British citizens was ruled unconstitutional.

Candidates must be Irish citizens and over 35 years old. There is a discrepancy between the English- and Irish-language texts of Article 12.4.1°. According to the English text, an eligible candidate "has reached his thirty-fifth year of age", whereas the Irish text states "ag a bhfuil cúig bliana tríochad slán (has completed his thirty-five years)". Because a person's thirty-fifth year of life begins on their thirty-fourth birthday, this means there is a year's difference between the minimum ages as stated in the two texts. However, the Irish version of the subsection prevails in accordance with the rule stated in Article 25.5.4°. Various proposals have been made to amend the Constitution so as to eliminate this discrepancy. The 29th government introduced the Thirty-fifth Amendment of the Constitution (Age of Eligibility for Election to the Office of President) Bill 2015 to reduce the age of candidacy from 35 to 21, which was put to referendum in May 2015; the bill was heavily defeated, with approximately 73% of voters voting against.

Presidents can serve a maximum of two terms, consecutive or otherwise. They must be nominated by one of the following:

- At least 20 members of the Houses of the Oireachtas; (there are 234 members)
- At least four county or city councils (there are 31 councils)
- Themselves (in the case of incumbent or former presidents who have served one term).

Where only one candidate is nominated, the candidate is deemed elected without the need for a ballot. For this reason, where there is a consensus among political parties not to have a contest, the president may be 'elected' without the occurrence of an actual ballot. Since the establishment of the office this has occurred on six occasions.

The 2nd most recent presidential election was held on 26 October 2018. The most recent presidential election was held on 24 October 2025.

=== Absence of a president ===
There is no office of vice president of Ireland. In the event of a premature vacancy in the presidency, a successor must be elected within sixty days. In a vacancy or where the president is unavailable, the duties and functions of the office are carried out by a Presidential Commission, consisting of the chief justice, the ceann comhairle (speaker) of the Dáil, and the cathaoirleach (chairperson) of the Seanad. Routine functions, such as signing bills into law, have often been fulfilled by the Presidential Commission when the president is abroad on a state visit. The Government's power to prevent the president leaving the state is relevant in aligning the diplomatic and legislative calendars.

Technically, each president's term of office expires at midnight on the day of the new president's inauguration. Therefore, between midnight and the swearing-in of a new president, official duties and functions of the presidency are carried out by the Presidential Commission. The constitution also empowers the Council of State, acting by a majority of its members, to "make such provision as to them may seem meet" for the exercise of the duties of the president in any contingency the constitution does not foresee. However, to date, it has never been necessary for the Council to take up this role. Although an outgoing president who has been re-elected is usually described in the media as "president" before the taking of the Declaration of Office, that is actually incorrect. Technically, the outgoing president is a former president and, if re-elected, president-elect.

Vacancies in the presidency have occurred three times: on the death in office of Erskine Hamilton Childers in 1974, and on the resignations of Cearbhall Ó Dálaigh in 1976 and Mary Robinson in 1997.

=== Impeachment and removal from office ===
The president can be removed from office in two ways, neither of which has ever been invoked. The Supreme Court, in a sitting of at least five judges, may find the president "permanently incapacitated", while the Oireachtas may remove the president for "stated misbehaviour". Either house of the Oireachtas may instigate the latter process by passing an impeachment resolution, provided at least thirty members move it and at least two-thirds support it. The other house will then either investigate the stated charges or commission a body to do so; following which at least two-thirds of members must agree both that the president is guilty and that the charges warrant removal.

== Routine functions ==
The Constitution of Ireland provides for a parliamentary system of government, by which the role of the head of state is largely a ceremonial one. The president is formally one of three parts of the Oireachtas (national parliament), which also comprises Dáil Éireann (the Assembly of Ireland or lower house) and Seanad Éireann (the Senate of Ireland or upper house). In this capacity, the president is the sole figure in Ireland's constitutional architecture with the power to enact and promulgate primary legislation.

However, unlike most parliamentary republics, the president is not designated as the nominal chief executive. Rather, executive authority in Ireland is expressly vested in the Government (informally known as "Cabinet") by Article 28.2 of the Constitution. For this reason, most of the president's routine functions may be performed only in accordance with the strict instructions of the Constitution, or on the binding advice of the Government. The taoiseach is nevertheless obliged by Article 28.5 to keep the president generally informed on matters of foreign and domestic policy. During these audiences, the president may consult, encourage, and warn the Government on any matter of public business – a right enjoyed by other heads of state operating in the Westminster tradition. Likewise, the president does possess certain personal powers that may be exercised discretionarily. Said reserve powers are discussed in the subsequent section.

=== Constitutional functions ===
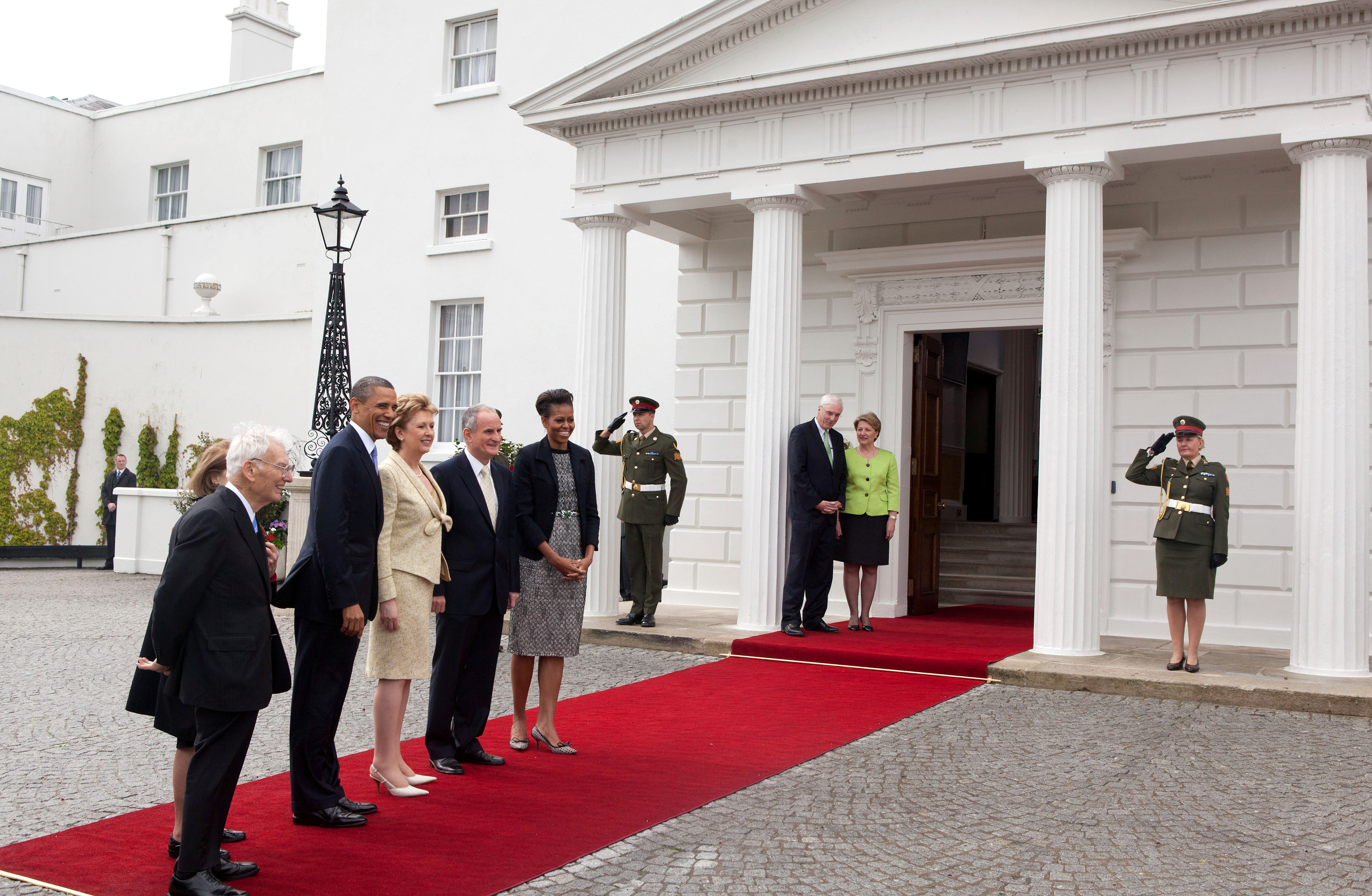
President Mary McAleese greets US President Barack Obama at Áras an Uachtaráin

The ministerial duties mandated by the Constitution are as follows:

Appoint the Government
The taoiseach (that is, Ireland's head of government) and ministers altogether comprise the Government, Ireland's central executive authority. The president formally appoints the members of the Government, and accepts their resignations. The taoiseach is appointed upon the nomination of the Dáil, and the president is required to appoint whomever the Dáil designates without the right to refuse appointment. All other ministers are appointed upon the advice of the taoiseach and with approval of the Dáil; as with appointing the taoiseach, the president is required to make the appointment without the right to appoint someone else. Ministers are dismissed on the advice of the taoiseach and the taoiseach must, unless there is a dissolution of the Dáil, resign upon losing the confidence of the house.

Appoint judges
The president appoints judges to all courts in Ireland. Said appointments are made on the advice of the Government via the Minister for Justice.

Appoint the constitutional officers of the State
The president appoints the attorney general and the comptroller and auditor general on the nomination of the taoiseach and Dáil Éireann, respectively. The president may dismiss the attorney general from office at any time if so advised by the taoiseach, whereas the comptroller and auditor general may only be dismissed for stated misbehavior or incapacity as resolved by both Houses of the Oireachtas.

Convene and dissolve the Dáil
The president convenes and dissolves the Dáil, a power which is exercised on the advice of the taoiseach; Government or Dáil approval is not needed. The president may only refuse a dissolution when a taoiseach has lost the confidence of the Dáil.

Sign bills into law
The president assents to bills, making them Acts of Oireachtas or statute law. The granting of assent is a largely ceremonial duty, as the president cannot veto a bill that the Dáil and the Seanad have duly adopted. However, the president may refer bills to the Supreme Court to test their constitutionality. If the Supreme Court upholds a bill, the president is obliged to sign it. If, however, it is found to be unconstitutional, the bill so referred is null and void. Likewise, the president may withhold assent to a bill until after a national referendum or general election is held, but only when so petitioned by a majority of the Seanad and at least one third of all duly elected Teachtaí Dála.

Represent Ireland abroad
The president is responsible for representing the state in foreign affairs, a power which is exercised only on the advice of the Government via the Minister for Foreign Affairs. The president accredits Irish ambassadors abroad, receives the letters of credence of foreign diplomats, and both pays and accepts state visits. Ministers sign international treaties in the president's name. This role was not exercised by the president prior to the Republic of Ireland Act 1948.

Serve as Supreme Commander of the Defence Forces
Supreme command and control over the Defence Forces vests in the president. This role is similar in status to that of a commander-in-chief. An officer's commission is signed and sealed by the president. This is a nominal function, the powers of which are exercised on the advice of the Government via the Minister for Defence.

Exercise the prerogative of mercy
The president has "the right of pardon and the power to commute or remit punishment". This function is exercised on the advice of the Government via the Minister for Justice. Pardon, for miscarriages of justice, has applied rarely: Thomas Quinn in 1940, Brady in 1943, and Nicky Kelly in 1992. The current procedure is specified by Section 7 of the Criminal Procedure Act, 1993. There were plans in 2005 for paramilitary fugitives to receive pardons as part of the Northern Ireland peace process, to supplement the 1998 early release of serving prisoners after the Good Friday Agreement. This was controversial and was soon abandoned along with similar British proposals. The power of commutation and remittance are not restricted to the president, though this was the case for death sentences handed down prior to the abolition of capital punishment.

=== Statutory functions ===
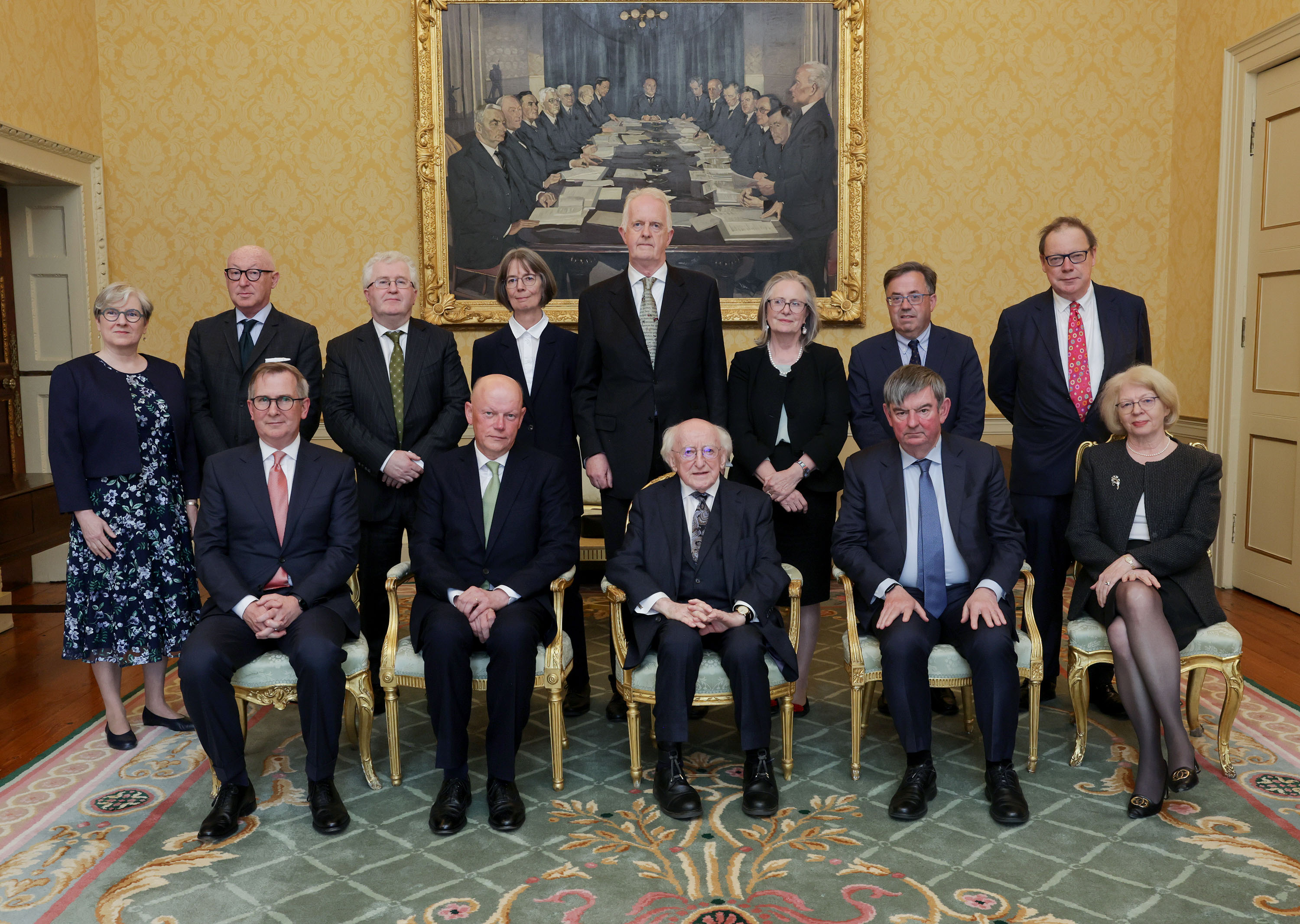
President Michael D. Higgins with the Chief Justice and Presidents of the Supreme Courts of Ireland

In additional to constitutional mandates, the president:

Appoints certain state officials
The president appoints various statutory officers on the advice of the Government, including the chairman of the council and senior professors of the Dublin Institute for Advanced Studies; the governor of the Central Bank of Ireland; the members of the Irish Financial Services Appeals Tribunal; and the members of the Garda Síochána Ombudsman Commission. The president also appoints, on the nomination of both Houses of the Oireachtas, the Ombudsman.

Appoints a Beatty Library trustee
The president appoints one trustee to the Chester Beatty Library. This was specified in Chester Beatty's will and given effect by a 1968 Act of the Oireachtas.

Serves as head of certain statutory charities
The president is ex officio president of the Irish Red Cross Society. The president is likewise ex officio patron of Gaisce – The President's Award, established by trust deed in 1985.

=== Civic functions ===
Constitutional and statutory functions aside, the president also:

Awards the dignity of Saoi for life
The president confers the title of Saoi for life on those so elected from among the existing membership of Aosdána, a state-supported association of Irish creative artists. The title is the highest honour bestowed by the organisation. There are at most seven living Saoithe at any time; a limit increased from five in 2007–08.

Supports myriad charities
The president serves as a patron to myriad charities in Ireland. The charities ultimately supported vary from president to president and are in keeping with the president's vision and theme for their presidency.

=== Special limitations ===
- The president may not leave the state without the consent of the Government.
- Every formal address or message "to the nation" or to either or both Houses of the Oireachtas must have prior approval of the Government. Other than on these two (quite rare) occasions, there is no limitation on the president's right to speak. While earlier presidents were exceptionally cautious in delivering speeches and on almost every occasion submitted them for vetting, Mary Robinson, Mary McAleese, and Michael D. Higgins made much more use of their right to speak without Government approval, with McAleese doing many live television and radio interviews. Nonetheless, by convention presidents refrain from direct criticism and commentary of the Government.

== Reserve powers ==
=== Powers exercised in absolute discretion ===
The president possesses the following powers exercised "in his absolute discretion" according to the English version of the Constitution. The Irish version states that these powers are exercised as a chomhairle féin which is usually translated as "under his own counsel". Lawyers have suggested that a conflict may exist in this case between the two versions of the constitution. In the event of a clash between the Irish and English versions of the constitution, the Irish one is given supremacy. While "absolute discretion" appears to leave some freedom for manoeuvre for a president in deciding whether to initiate contact with the opposition, "own counsel" has been interpreted by some lawyers as suggesting that no contact whatsoever can take place. As a result, it is considered controversial for the president to be contacted by the leaders of any political parties in an effort to influence a decision made using the discretionary powers.

==== Refusal of a Dáil dissolution ====
A taoiseach who has "ceased to retain the support of a majority in Dáil Eireann" is required to resign, unless the taoiseach asks the president to dissolve the Dáil. The president has the right to refuse such a request, in which case the taoiseach must resign immediately. This power has never been invoked. However, the necessary circumstances existed in 1944, 1982 and 1994. The apparent discrepancy, referred to above, between the Irish and English versions of the Constitution has discouraged presidents from contemplating the use of the power. On the three occasions when the necessary circumstances existed, this same discrepancy has led presidents to adopt an ultra-strict policy of non-contact with the opposition. The most notable instance of this was in January 1982, when Patrick Hillery instructed an aide, Captain Anthony Barber, to ensure that no telephone calls from the opposition were to be passed on to him. Nevertheless, three opposition figures, including Fianna Fáil leader Charles Haughey, demanded to be connected to Hillery, with Haughey threatening to end Barber's career if the calls weren't put through. Hillery considered such pressure as gross misconduct. As Supreme Commander of the Defence Forces, Hillery recorded the threat in Barber's military personnel file and noted that Barber had been acting on his instructions in refusing the call. Even without this consideration, refusing such a request would arguably create a constitutional crisis, as it is considered a fairly strong constitutional convention that the president will always grant an early dissolution to facilitate the electoral process unless an alternative Government can be formed which can be expected to command the confidence of the Dáil for a reasonable length of time. (Note: "The presidential power of refusal provided for in 13.2.2° has never formally been used (although the possibility or anticipation of it being used may have been decisive). There is some uncertainty as to the scope of the power, and as to the specific circumstances in which it may be used. In particular, there is uncertainty as to what specific events or circumstances allow the President to exercise the power of refusal. The Constitution states that the power may be used where the Taoiseach has lost 'the support of a majority' in the Dáil, but the question of what political events indicate such a loss of support is unclear. There is no definition in the Constitution as to what a loss of majority support means in practice.")

==== Appointees to the Council of State ====
The president appoints up to seven members of the Council of State, and may remove or replace such appointed members.

=== Powers exercised after consulting the Council of State ===
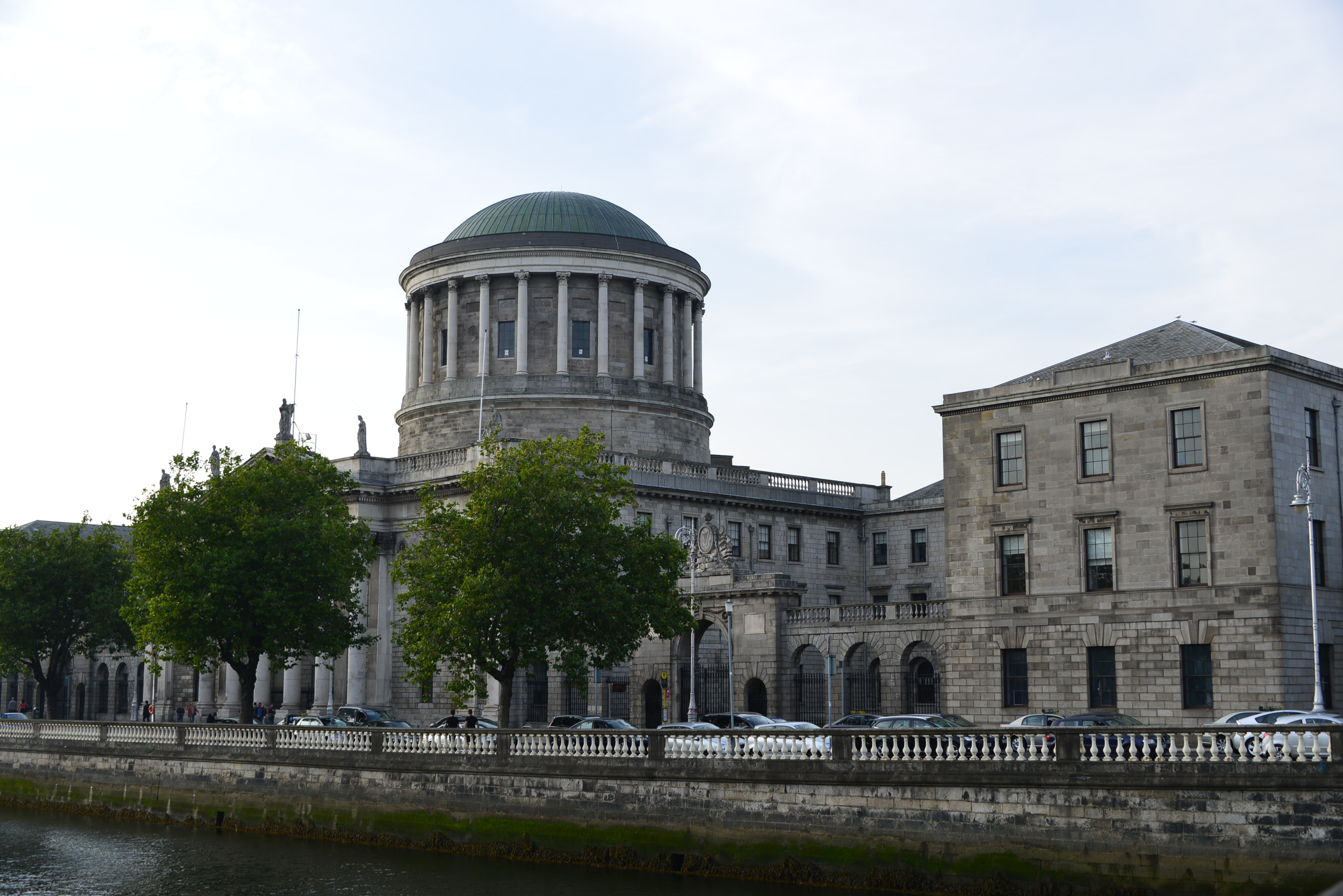
The President has the power to refer a bill, either in whole or in part, to the Supreme Court

It is required that, before exercising certain reserve powers, the president consult the Council of State. However, the president is not compelled to act in accordance with the Council's advice. Indeed, the president may act contrary to its advice. Those powers are as follows:

==== Refer bills to the Supreme Court ====
The president may refer a bill, in whole or part, to the Supreme Court to test its constitutionality. If the Supreme Court finds any referred part unconstitutional, the entire bill falls. This power may not be applied to a money bill, a bill to amend the Constitution, or an urgent bill the time for the consideration of which has been abridged in the Seanad. This is the most widely used reserve power; a full list is at Council of State (Ireland)#Referring of bills. In a 1982 judgment delivered under such a referral, Chief Justice Tom O'Higgins bemoaned the crude strictures of the prescribed process; especially the fact that, if the court finds that a bill does not violate the Constitution, this judgment can never subsequently be challenged.

==== Refer bills to the people ====
If requested to do so by a petition signed by a majority of the membership of the Seanad and one-third of the membership of the Dáil, the president may, after consultation with the Council of State, decline to sign into law a bill (other than a bill to amend the constitution) they consider to be of great "national importance" until it has been approved by either the people in a referendum or the Dáil reassembling after a general election, held within eighteen months. This power has never been used, and no such petition has been invoked. Of the 60 senators, 11 are nominated by the Taoiseach, so there is rarely a majority opposed to a Government bill.

==== Maintain parliamentary democracy ====
Aside from assuring the constitutionality of primary legislation and facilitating the referendum process, the presidency is endowed with powers concerning the institutional stability and continuity of the Oireachtas. The president may, at the request of the Dáil, impose a time-limit on the period during which the Seanad may consider a bill. The effect of this power is to restrict the power of the Seanad to delay a bill that the Government considers urgent. Conversely, the president may, if requested to do so by the Seanad, establish a Committee of Privileges to resolve a dispute between the two Houses of the Oireachtas as to whether or not a bill is a money bill. In practice, this power guarantees the Seanad is able to exercise its rights as an upper house. Likewise, the president may convene a meeting of either or both Houses of the Oireachtas. This power allows the president to step in if, in extraordinary circumstances, the ordinary procedures for convening the houses had broken down.

==== Communicate with Ireland's parliament and people ====
The presidency's remaining reserve powers embrace formal communications of a legislative or historically significant nature. The president may address, or send a message to, either or both Houses of the Oireachtas. Four such addresses have been made: one by de Valera, two by Robinson, and one by McAleese. The approval of the Government is needed for the message; in practice, the entire text is submitted. The president may also "address a message to the Nation" subject to the same conditions as an address to the Oireachtas. This power has never been used. Commonplace messages, such as Christmas greetings or communications of a purely civic or charitable character, are not considered to qualify.

== Privileges of office ==
=== Residence and honours ===
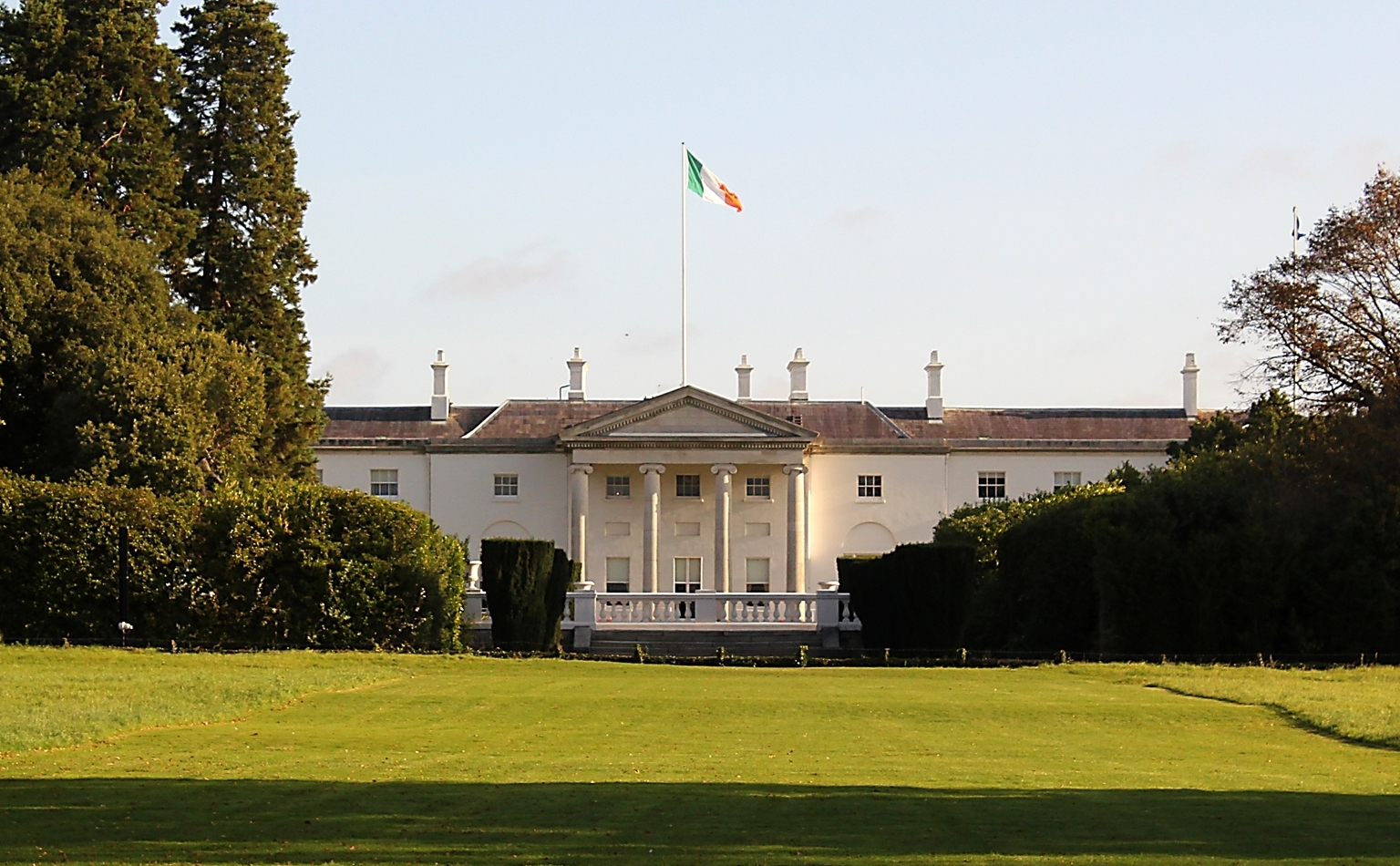
Áras an Uachtaráin is the official residence of the president.

The official residence of the president is Áras an Uachtaráin, located in the Phoenix Park in Dublin. The ninety-two-room building formerly served as the 'out-of-season' residence of the Irish Lord Lieutenant and the residence of two of the three Irish Governors-General: Tim Healy and James McNeill. In 2025, while Áras an Uachtaráin was being renovated, President Catherine Connolly lived elsewhere in Phoenix Park, in the Steward's Lodge. The president is normally referred to as 'President' or 'Uachtarán', rather than 'Mr/Madam President' or similar forms. The style used is normally His Excellency/Her Excellency (Irish: A Shoilse/A Soilse); sometimes people may orally address the president as 'Your Excellency' (Irish: A Shoilse [ə ˈhəil̠ʲʃə]), or simply 'President' (Irish: A Uachtaráin [ə ˈuəxt̪ˠəɾˠaːnʲ] (vocative case)). The Presidential Salute is taken from the National Anthem, "Amhrán na bhFiann". It consists of the first four bars followed by the last five, without lyrics.

=== Office of the President ===
The Office of the President is a part of the Civil Service of the State headed by the Secretary-General to the President. Much of the protocol and convention surrounding the presidency was developed by Michael McDunphy, the first Secretary-General (then called Secretary). The budget estimate for 2026 for the office is €6.2 million, including €2.8 million for the staff of Áras an Uachtaráin. Oireachtas debate on this budget item is curtailed due to the president's constitutional independence. The Office of the President liaises with the government via the Government Secretariat in the Department of the Taoiseach. Maintenance of the official residence is by the Office of Public Works. A president is entitled to choose non–civil servants to employ as special adviser, head of communications, speech writer and personal assistant.

=== Inauguration ===
The inauguration ceremony takes place on the day following the expiry of the term of office of the preceding president. No location is specified in the constitution, but all inaugurations have taken place in Saint Patrick's Hall in the State Apartments in Dublin Castle. The ceremony is transmitted live by national broadcaster RTÉ on its principal television and radio channels, typically from around 11 am. To highlight the significance of the event, all key figures in the executive (the government of Ireland), the legislature (Oireachtas) and the judiciary attend, as do members of the diplomatic corps and other invited guests.

During the period of the Irish Free State (1922 to 1937), the governor-general had been installed into office as the representative of the Crown in a low-key ceremony, twice in Leinster House (the seat of the Oireachtas), but in the case of the last governor-general, Domhnall Ua Buachalla, in his brother's drawing room. By contrast, the Constitution of Ireland adopted in 1937 requires the president's oath of office be taken in public.

=== Remuneration and expenses ===
After the 2018 presidential election the official salary or "personal remuneration" of the president will be €249,014. Former president, Michael D. Higgins, choose to receive the same salary although he was entitled to a higher figure of €325,507. The president's total "emoluments and allowances" includes an additional €317,434 for expenses. The Office of the President's total budget estimate for 2017 was €3.9 million, of which €2.6 million was for pay and running costs, and the balance for the "President's Bounty" paid to centenarians on their hundredth birthday.

The salary was fixed at IR£5000 from 1938 to 1973, since when it has been calculated as 10% greater than that of the chief justice. After the post-2008 Irish economic downturn most public-sector workers took significant pay cuts, but the Constitution prohibited a reduction in the salary of the president and the judiciary during their terms of office, in order to prevent such a reduction being used by the government to apply political pressure on them. While a 2011 Constitutional amendment allows judges' pay to be cut, it did not extend to the president, although incumbent Mary McAleese offered to take a voluntary cut in solidarity.

=== Security and transport ===
The inauguration of Seán T. O'Kelly in 1945. The 2nd Cavalry Squadron of the Blue Hussars escort the president, who travelled in the late Queen Alexandra's landau. The Landau and the Hussars were later scrapped.

As head of state of Ireland, the president receives the highest level of protection in the state. Áras an Uachtaráin is protected by armed guards from the Garda Síochána and Defence Forces at all times, and is encircled by security fencing and intrusion detection systems. At all times the president travels with an armed security detail in Ireland and overseas, which is provided by the Special Detective Unit (SDU), an elite wing of the Irish police force. Protection is increased if there is a known threat. The presidential limousine is a Mercedes-Benz S-Class LWB. The Presidential Limousine is dark navy blue and carries the presidential standard on the left front wing and the tricolour on the right front wing. When travelling the presidential limousine is always accompanied by support cars (normally BMW 5 Series, Audi A6 and Volvo S60 driven by trained drivers from the SDU) and several Garda motorcycle outriders from the Garda Traffic Corps which form a protective convoy around the car.

The president-elect is usually escorted to and from the ceremony by the Presidential Motorcycle Escort ceremonial outriders. Until 1947 they were a cavalry mounted escort, known as the Blue Hussars (due to wearing light blue hussar-style uniforms). However to save money the First Inter-Party Government replaced the Irish horses by Japanese motorbikes, which the then Minister for Defence believed would be "much more impressive".

At the presidential inauguration in 1945, alongside the mounted escort on horseback, president-elect Seán T. O'Kelly rode in the old state landau of Queen Alexandra. The use of the state carriage was highly popular with crowds. However an accident with a later presidential carriage at the Royal Dublin Society Horse show led to the abolition of the carriage and its replacement by a Rolls-Royce Silver Wraith landaulette in 1947. This distinctive car is still the Presidential State Car, which is used only for ceremonial occasions, as to bring the president to and from the inauguration.

The president also has the full use of all Irish Air Corps aircraft at his/her disposal if so needed, including helicopters and private jets.

== Issues of controversy ==
=== Presidential role in Northern Ireland ===
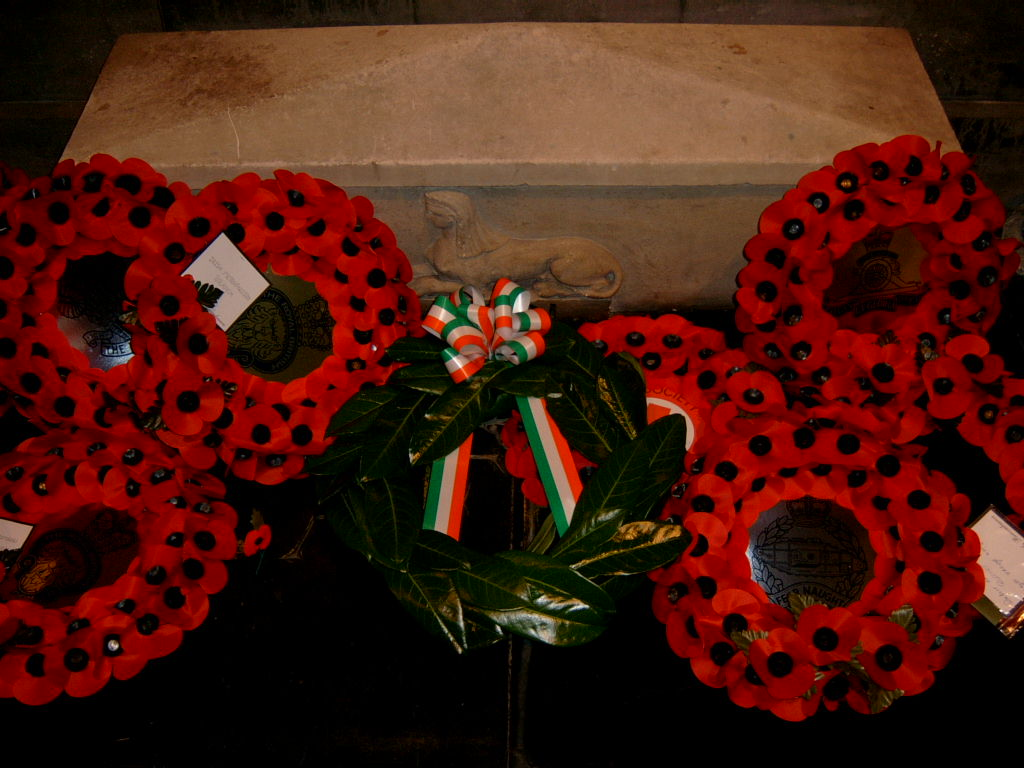
The president's wreath (in green) laid at Ireland's Remembrance Day ceremonies in St. Patrick's Cathedral in 2005. Presidents have attended the ceremony since the 1990s.

The text of the Constitution of Ireland, as originally enacted in 1937, made reference in its Articles 2 and 3 to two geopolitical entities: a thirty-two county 'national territory' (i.e., the island of Ireland), and a twenty-six county 'state' formerly known as the Irish Free State. The implication behind the title 'president of Ireland' was that the president would function as the head of all Ireland. However, this implication was challenged by the Ulster Unionists and the United Kingdom of Great Britain and Northern Ireland which was the state internationally acknowledged as having sovereignty over Northern Ireland. Articles 2 and 3 were substantially amended in consequence of the 1998 Good Friday Agreement.

Ireland in turn challenged the proclamation in the United Kingdom of Queen Elizabeth II in 1952 as '[Queen] of the United Kingdom of Great Britain and Northern Ireland'. The Irish government refused to attend royal functions as a result; for example, Patrick Hillery declined on government advice to attend the wedding of the Prince of Wales to Lady Diana Spencer in 1981, to which he had been invited by Queen Elizabeth, just as Seán T. O'Kelly had declined on government advice to attend the 1953 Coronation Garden Party at the British Embassy in Dublin. Britain in turn insisted on referring to the president as 'president of the Republic of Ireland' or 'president of the Irish Republic'. (Note: The office of "President of the Irish Republic" existed in the separatist Irish Republic of 1919–21.) Letters of Credence from Queen Elizabeth, on the British government's advice, appointing United Kingdom ambassadors to Ireland were not addressed to the 'president of Ireland' but to the president personally (for example: 'President Hillery').

The naming dispute and consequent avoidance of contact at head of state level has gradually thawed since 1990. President Robinson (1990–97) chose unilaterally to break the taboo by regularly visiting the United Kingdom for public functions, frequently in connection with Anglo-Irish relations or to visit the Irish emigrant community in Great Britain. In another breaking of precedent, she accepted an invitation to Buckingham Palace by Queen Elizabeth II. Palace accreditation supplied to journalists referred to the "visit of the president of Ireland". Between 1990 and 2010, both Robinson and her successor President McAleese (1997–2011) visited the Palace on numerous occasions, while senior members of the British royal family – the then-Prince of Wales (later Charles III); the then-Duke of York (later Andrew Mountbatten-Windsor); Prince Edward, then-Earl of Wessex; and Prince Philip, Duke of Edinburgh – all visited both presidents of Ireland at Áras an Uachtaráin. The presidents also attended functions with the Princess Royal. President Robinson jointly hosted a reception with the queen at St. James's Palace, London, in 1995, to commemorate the one hundred and fiftieth anniversary of the foundation of the Queen's Colleges in 1845 (the Queen's Colleges are now known as Queen's University Belfast, University College Cork, and the University of Galway). These contacts eventually led to a state visit of Elizabeth II to Ireland in 2011.

Though the president's title implicitly asserted authority in Northern Ireland, in reality the Irish president needed government permission to visit there. (The Constitution of Ireland in Article 3 explicitly stated that "[p]ending the re-integration of the national territory" the authority of the Irish state did not extend to Northern Ireland. Presidents prior to the presidency of Mary Robinson were regularly refused permission by the Irish government to visit Northern Ireland.)

However, since the 1990s and in particular since the Good Friday Agreement of 1998, the president has regularly visited Northern Ireland. President McAleese, who was the first president to have been born in Northern Ireland, continued on from President Robinson in this regard. In a sign of the warmth of modern British-Irish relations, she has even been warmly welcomed by most leading unionists. At the funeral for a child murdered by the Real IRA in Omagh she symbolically walked up the main aisle of the church hand-in-hand with the Ulster Unionist Party leader and then First Minister of Northern Ireland, David Trimble. But in other instances, Mary McAleese had been criticised for certain comments, such as a reference to the way in which Protestant children in Northern Ireland had been brought up to hate Catholics just as German children had been encouraged to hate Jews under the Nazi regime, on 27 January 2005, following her attendance at the ceremony commemorating the sixtieth anniversary of the liberation of Auschwitz concentration camp. These remarks caused outrage among Northern Ireland's unionist politicians, and McAleese later apologised and conceded that her statement had been unbalanced.

=== Suggestions for reform ===
There have been many suggestions for reforming the office of president over the years. In 1996, the Constitutional Review Group recommended that the office of president should remain largely unchanged. However, it suggested that the Constitution should be amended to explicitly declare the president to be head of state (at present that term does not appear in the text), and that consideration be given to the introduction of a constructive vote of no confidence system in the Dáil, along the lines of that in Germany. If this system were introduced then the power of the president to refuse a Dáil dissolution would be largely redundant and could be taken away. The All-party Oireachtas Committee on the Constitution's 1998 Report made similar recommendations.

In an October 2009 poll, concerning support for various potential candidates in the 2011 presidential election conducted by the Sunday Independent, a "significant number" of people were said to feel that the presidency is a waste of money and should be abolished.

== List of presidents of Ireland ==
The functions of the president were exercised by the Presidential Commission from the coming into force of the Constitution on 29 December 1937 until the election of Douglas Hyde in 1938, and during the vacancies of 1974, 1976, and 1997.

No.	Portrait	Name (Birth–Death)	Previous service	Term of office	Duration	Election	Nominated by
1		Douglas Hyde (1860–1949)	Senator (1922–1925, 1938)	25 June 1938 – 24 June 1945	7 years	1938	Fianna Fáil
1		Douglas Hyde (1860–1949)	Senator (1922–1925, 1938)	25 June 1938 – 24 June 1945	7 years	1938	Fine Gael
2		Seán T. O'Kelly (1882–1966)	Tánaiste (1932–1945)	25 June 1945 – 24 June 1959	14 years	1945	Fianna Fáil
2		Seán T. O'Kelly (1882–1966)	Tánaiste (1932–1945)	25 June 1945 – 24 June 1959	14 years	1952	Independent
3		Éamon de Valera (1882–1975)	Taoiseach (1932–1948, 1951–1954, 1957–1959)	25 June 1959 – 24 June 1973	14 years	1959	Fianna Fáil
3		Éamon de Valera (1882–1975)	Taoiseach (1932–1948, 1951–1954, 1957–1959)	25 June 1959 – 24 June 1973	14 years	1966	Fianna Fáil
4		Erskine Childers (1905–1974)	Tánaiste (1969–1973)	25 June 1973 – 17 November 1974	1 year, 145 days	1973	Fianna Fáil
5		Cearbhall Ó Dálaigh (Note: His name is sometimes given in the alternative spelling of Carroll O'Daly.) (1911–1978)	Chief Justice of Ireland (1961–1973)	19 December 1974 – 22 October 1976	1 year, 308 days	1974	Fianna Fáil
5		Cearbhall Ó Dálaigh (1911–1978)	Chief Justice of Ireland (1961–1973)	19 December 1974 – 22 October 1976	1 year, 308 days	1974	Fine Gael
5		Cearbhall Ó Dálaigh (1911–1978)	Chief Justice of Ireland (1961–1973)	19 December 1974 – 22 October 1976	1 year, 308 days	1974	Labour
6		Patrick Hillery (1923–2008)	European Commissioner for Social Affairs (1973–1976)	3 December 1976 – 2 December 1990	14 years	1976	Fianna Fáil
6		Patrick Hillery (1923–2008)	European Commissioner for Social Affairs (1973–1976)	3 December 1976 – 2 December 1990	14 years	1983	Independent
7		Mary Robinson (born 1944)	Senator (1969–1989)	3 December 1990 – 12 September 1997	6 years, 283 days	1990	Labour
7		Mary Robinson (born 1944)	Senator (1969–1989)	3 December 1990 – 12 September 1997	6 years, 283 days	1990	Workers' Party
8		Mary McAleese (born 1951)	Reid Professor of Criminal law, Criminology and Penology at Trinity College Dublin	11 November 1997 – 10 November 2011	14 years	1997	Fianna Fáil
8		Mary McAleese (born 1951)	Reid Professor of Criminal law, Criminology and Penology at Trinity College Dublin	11 November 1997 – 10 November 2011	14 years	1997	Progressive Democrats
8		Mary McAleese (born 1951)	Reid Professor of Criminal law, Criminology and Penology at Trinity College Dublin	11 November 1997 – 10 November 2011	14 years	2004	Independent
9		Michael D. Higgins (born 1941)	Minister for Arts, Culture and Gaeltacht (1993–1997)	11 November 2011 – 10 November 2025	14 years	2011	Labour
9		Michael D. Higgins (born 1941)	Minister for Arts, Culture and Gaeltacht (1993–1997)	11 November 2011 – 10 November 2025	14 years	2018	Independent
10		Catherine Connolly (born 1955)	Leas-Cheann Comhairle (2020–2024)	11 November 2025 – Incumbent	343 days	2025	Sinn Féin
10		Catherine Connolly (born 1955)	Leas-Cheann Comhairle (2020–2024)	11 November 2025 – Incumbent	343 days	2025	Labour
10		Catherine Connolly (born 1955)	Leas-Cheann Comhairle (2020–2024)	11 November 2025 – Incumbent	343 days	2025	Social Democrats
10		Catherine Connolly (born 1955)	Leas-Cheann Comhairle (2020–2024)	11 November 2025 – Incumbent	343 days	2025	PBP–Solidarity
10		Catherine Connolly (born 1955)	Leas-Cheann Comhairle (2020–2024)	11 November 2025 – Incumbent	343 days	2025	Green
10		Catherine Connolly (born 1955)	Leas-Cheann Comhairle (2020–2024)	11 November 2025 – Incumbent	343 days	2025	100% Redress
10		Catherine Connolly (born 1955)	Leas-Cheann Comhairle (2020–2024)	11 November 2025 – Incumbent	343 days	2025	Independent

Former presidents who are able and willing to act are members of the Council of State.

== See also ==
- President of the Irish Republic
- Gaisce – The President's Award
- Seal of the president of Ireland
- Presidential standard of Ireland
- Warrant of appointment

== Sources ==
- "Constitution of Ireland". Department of the Taoiseach.
- Constitution Review Group (July 1996). "Article XII – XIV: The President" (PDF). Report. Dublin: Stationery Office. pp. 19–28. Archived from the original (PDF) on 21 July 2011.
- All-party Oireachtas Committee on the Constitution (1998). The President (PDF). Progress Reports. Vol. 3. Dublin: Stationery Office. ISBN 978-0-7076-6161-2. Archived from the original (PDF) on 21 July 2011.
- O'Keeffe, Jane (2013), Voices from the Great Houses of Ireland: Life in the Big House: Cork and Kerry, Mercier Press, ISBN 978-1781171936.
