= Presidential Commission (Ireland) =

Body that substitutes for the president of Ireland

The Presidential Commission (Irish: Coimisiún na hUachtaránachta) is a body which performs the functions of the president of Ireland in the case of a vacancy or temporary absence.

== Membership ==
Three members serve on the Presidential Commission.

Office	Description	Incumbent
Chief Justice	President of the Supreme Court	Donal O'Donnell
Ceann Comhairle	Chairperson of Dáil Éireann	Verona Murphy
Cathaoirleach	Chairperson of Seanad Éireann	Mark Daly

Under Article 14.2 of the Constitution of Ireland, the President of the Court of Appeal acts as a member in place of the Chief Justice if that office is vacant. The Leas-Cheann Comhairle acts as a member in place of the Ceann Comhairle if that office is vacant. The Leas-Chathaoirleach acts as a member in place of the Cathaoirleach if that office is vacant. The Commission may act with at least two members.

Prior to the ratification by referendum on 4 October 2013 of the Thirty-third Amendment of the Constitution of Ireland, which established the Court of Appeal, Article 14 specified that the President of the High Court would act as a member in place of the Chief Justice. However, the Thirty-third Amendment placed the President of the new Court of Appeal ahead of the President of the High Court in the Irish judicial hierarchy, as the second most senior judge in the country. This necessitated the amendment to the membership of the Presidential Commission.

A proposal to abolish the Seanad, which was rejected at referendum in 2013, would have seen the Leas-Cheann Comhairle take the place of the Cathaoirleach on the Commission.

== Powers ==
The Presidential Commission fulfills all functions and duties of the office of President of Ireland when the office of President is vacant, or when the President is unavailable.

Vacancy may occur:

- on the death of the incumbent, as in 1974;
- on the resignation of the incumbent, as in 1976 and 1997;
- by impeachment of the incumbent, which has never happened;
- in the short interval between the conclusion of one president's term of office and the inauguration of a successor the next day — although the Presidential Commission has never been required to act in this time.

The Presidential Commission has often acted when the president is abroad, typically while making a state visit. When the 22nd government of Ireland collapsed in November 1992, president Mary Robinson was abroad. The resignation of the Progressive Democrats ministers, the appointment by Taoiseach Albert Reynolds of caretaker Fianna Fáil replacement ministers, and Reynolds' request for a dissolution of the Dáil, were all effected by the Presidential Commission. Temporary illness may also indispose the President. No President has ever refused to fulfil any of the duties of office.

Bills have occasionally been signed into law by the presidential commission while the president is out of the country; for example, the presidential commission signed the Marriage Act 2015 legislating for same-sex marriage as Michael D. Higgins was in the United States.

== Origins ==
The Presidential Commission was created in the 1937 Constitution of Ireland. It was first used between 29 December 1937, when the Constitution came into force, and 25 June 1938, when the first president was inaugurated. During this period, under the Transitory Provisions of the Constitution, the commission consisted of Chief Justice, the President of the High Court, and the Ceann Comhairle. Its composition differed from later commissions, as Seanad Éireann had not been constituted and elected.

== Members of the Presidential Commission as acting President of Ireland ==
=== 1937–1938 ===
From the adoption of the Constitution of Ireland to the inauguration of Douglas Hyde.

Name	Office	Period	
Timothy Sullivan	Chief Justice	29 December 1937	25 June 1938
Frank Fahy	Ceann Comhairle	29 December 1937	25 June 1938
Conor Maguire	President of the High Court	29 December 1937	25 June 1938

=== 1974 ===
From the death of Erskine H. Childers to the inauguration of Cearbhall Ó Dálaigh.

Name	Office	Period	
Tom O'Higgins	Chief Justice	17 November 1974	19 December 1974
Seán Treacy	Ceann Comhairle	17 November 1974	19 December 1974
James Dooge	Cathaoirleach	17 November 1974	19 December 1974

=== 1976 ===
From the resignation of Cearbhall Ó Dálaigh to the inauguration of Patrick Hillery.

Name	Office	Period	
Tom O'Higgins	Chief Justice	22 October 1976	3 December 1976
Seán Treacy	Ceann Comhairle	22 October 1976	3 December 1976
James Dooge	Cathaoirleach	22 October 1976	3 December 1976

=== 1997 ===
From the resignation of Mary Robinson to the inauguration of Mary McAleese.

Name	Office	Period	
Liam Hamilton	Chief Justice	12 September 1997	11 November 1997
Séamus Pattison	Ceann Comhairle	12 September 1997	11 November 1997
Liam T. Cosgrave	Cathaoirleach	12 September 1997	17 September 1997
Brian Mullooly	Cathaoirleach	17 September 1997	11 November 1997

== See also ==
- Council of State
- Lords Commissioners deputise at Westminster for the UK monarch
- Lord Justices (Ireland) deputised in Dublin when the Lord Lieutenant of Ireland was in Britain
