= Council of State (Ireland) =

Group that advises the President of Ireland

Members of the Council of State attending a meeting held on 20 April 2026

The Council of State (Irish: an Chomhairle Stáit) is a body established by the Constitution of Ireland to advise the President of Ireland in the exercise of many of their discretionary, reserve powers. It also has authority to provide for the temporary exercise of the duties of the president if these cannot be exercised by either the president or the Presidential Commission (an eventuality that is very unlikely to occur, since it would require the simultaneous absence of the President and two members of the three-member Commission).

== Members ==
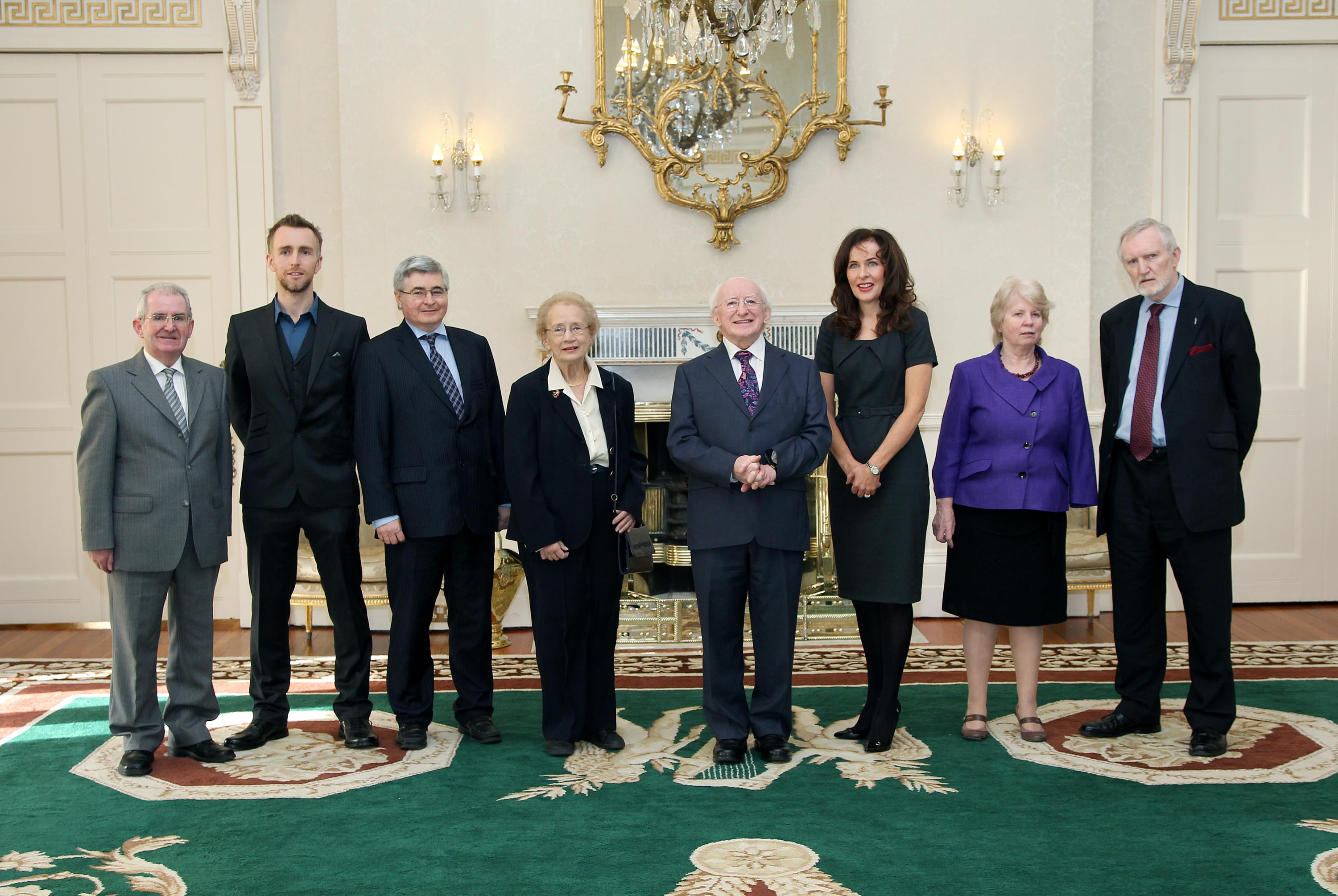
Members of the Council of State of Ireland in January 2012

The Council of State consists of a number of government officials, who sit ex officio, as well as certain former office holders and up to seven individuals of the president's own choosing. The ex officio members comprise the attorney general as well as individuals from each of three branches of government: legislature, executive and judiciary.

Unlike most of the president's other duties, which must be conducted in accordance with the advice of the cabinet, the seven presidential appointees to the Council of State are chosen at the president's absolute discretion. These appointees retain their positions until the president's successor takes office.

Class	Office	Current members
Ex officio: executive	Taoiseach	Micheál Martin
Ex officio: executive	Tánaiste	Simon Harris
Ex officio: legislature	Ceann Comhairle	Verona Murphy
Ex officio: legislature	Cathaoirleach	Mark Daly
Ex officio: judiciary	Chief Justice	Donal O'Donnell
Ex officio: judiciary	President of the Court of Appeal	Caroline Costello
Ex officio: judiciary	President of the High Court	David Barniville
Ex officio	Attorney General	Rossa Fanning
Former officeholders	President	Mary Robinson, Mary McAleese, Michael D. Higgins
Former officeholders	Taoiseach	Bertie Ahern, Brian Cowen, Enda Kenny, Leo Varadkar, Simon Harris
Former officeholders	Chief Justice	Ronan Keane, Susan Denham, Frank Clarke
Former officeholders	President of the Executive Council of the Irish Free State	None (Note: The office of President of the Executive Council was superseded in 1937 by that of Taoiseach, and was only held by two persons; W. T. Cosgrave, who held no other office which grants lifetime membership in the Council of State, and who died in 1965; and Éamon de Valera, who later served as Taoiseach and President, and who died in 1975. The 1996 Constitution Review Group proposed removing, as obsolete, mention of the office in relation to the Council of State.)
President's nominees	(List of former nominees)	Fionnuala Ní Aoláin, Linda Ervine, Colin Harvey, Kathleen Lynch, Donncha O'Connell, Conor O'Mahony, Ciarán Ó hÓgartaigh

The Constitution explicitly states that members appointed by the President may resign, or be dismissed by the President. Former office holders are members if "able and willing to act as a member", which implies an ability to resign; but there is no provision for dismissing them. When the McCracken Tribunal found in 1997 that former Taoiseach Charles Haughey had misled the Tribunal, there were calls for him to formally resign from the Council of State. He did not do so, although he sent his regrets to subsequent meetings of the council until his death.

Members of the Council of State may be excused from jury duty.

The Constitution specifies a declaration of office, "in the presence of Almighty God", which a new member must take before attending an official meeting. Éamon Gilmore, a declared agnostic, sought legal advice before attending the 2013 Council meeting as Tánaiste. The 1996 Constitutional Review Group recommended making the religious part optional. In 2013, six of the seven Presidential appointees to the Council of State jointly made a similar submission to the Constitutional Convention which was discussing removing the offence of blasphemy from the constitution.

== Role ==
Before exercising any reserve power but one, the President is required to seek the advice of the Council of State, although not required to follow its advice. The one exception, where the President has "absolute discretion", is in deciding to refuse a dissolution to a Taoiseach who has lost the confidence of the Dáil. The remaining discretionary powers, which do require prior consultation with the Council of State, are as follows (for a detailed description of the president's reserve powers see: President of Ireland#Discretionary powers):

- Convening a meeting of either or both Houses of the Oireachtas
- Addressing the Oireachtas
- Addressing the Nation
- Establishing a committee of privileges to resolve a dispute between the Houses over a putative money bill
- Abridging the time for considering a bill in the Seanad
- Referring a bill to the Supreme Court to test its Constitutionality
- Referring a bill to the people for an "ordinary referendum"

The draft of the Constitution gave more powers to the Council of State. Article 13 allows additional powers to be given to the President acting on the advice of the Government; originally, it was the advice of the Council of State that was to be required. Article 14 provides for a Presidential Commission as the collective vice-presidency of the state when the President is absent; originally the Council of State was to fill this function. Nevertheless, under Article 14.4 of the constitution the Council of State, acting by a majority of its members, has the authority to "make such provision as to them may seem meet" for the exercise of the duties of the president in any contingency the constitution does not foresee. This provision has never been invoked.

The Third Amendment of the Constitution Bill, 1958, which was defeated at a referendum, gave a role to the Council of State in the work of an envisaged constituency boundary commission.

Close to the time of its inception, the Council of State was likened to a privy council, although Jim Duffy calls this "more apparent than real" as it has no legislative or judicial functions. Gemma Hussey, who was a member of the Council of State in 1989–90, described it as "largely a symbolic body". Actress Siobhán McKenna, appointed to the council by Patrick Hillery, suggested in the 1980s that the Council approach Ronald Reagan regarding the Troubles in Northern Ireland; Hillery's secretary remarked there was "no point in trying to explain" to McKenna that the council had no role in such matters.

== Meetings ==
Working meetings called by the President for consultation under the terms of the Constitution are rare, though less so since the election of Mary Robinson in 1990. Four meetings have related to an address the Oireachtas, which requires the approval of the Government as well as the consultation of the Council of State. All other meetings have been to advise the President about whether to refer a bill to the Supreme Court.

Meetings are held in Áras an Uachtaráin. Members arrive 15 minutes before the meeting starts, and are served light refreshments in the Council of State Room. At the first meeting of the Council in Mary McAleese's first term, there was a photocall in the State Reception Rooms. Members are seated in order of precedence in the Presidents' Room around a 1927 dining table purchased by President de Valera in 1961. The Secretary-General to the President serves as clerk to the council. The Council does not offer collective advice; the President asks each member in turn to comment, and further discussion may involve several members. No vote or show of hands is taken.

The council's deliberations are held in camera, as for cabinet meetings, though there is no explicit requirement for confidentiality. The Irish Times obtained details of a 1984 meeting from an unnamed attendee, while James Dooge discussed a 1976 meeting years later with journalist Stephen Collins. A 2019 legal request under the EU directive on public access to environmental information for records of 1999 and 2002 council meetings was rejected by the Supreme Court in 2022, on the grounds that the President's constitutional immunity from court or Oireachtas scrutiny extended to the Council in its role as advisor to the President.

Apart from the Council of State's official meetings, its members are invited to important state functions, such as state funerals, the National Day of Commemoration, and the inauguration of the next President. The first President, Douglas Hyde, dined monthly with the members of his Council of State. The seven new presidential nominees of Mary McAleese's second term were introduced at a luncheon in the Áras the month after their appointment. Campaigning in the 1990 presidential election, Mary Robinson promised to have meetings of the Council regularly rather than on "an emergency basis".

=== Addresses to the Oireachtas ===
Date of meeting	President	Topic of Address	Date of Address (link to text)	Notes
20 December 1968	Éamon de Valera	50th anniversary of the First Dáil	21 January 1969	Brendan Corish was the only absentee from the Council of State meeting.
29 June 1992	Mary Robinson	"the Irish Identity in Europe"	8 July 1992	
24 January 1995	Mary Robinson	"Cherishing the Irish Diaspora"	2 February 1995	
28 October 1999	Mary McAleese	Marking the millennium	16 December 1999	Charles Haughey, Albert Reynolds, and Mary Robinson were absent.

=== Referring of bills ===
In some cases, the President has decided to sign the bill (thereby enacting it) without referring it to the Supreme Court; in other cases, the President has referred the bill (or sections of it) and the court has upheld its constitutionality, and in other cases the Court has found some or all of the referred portions to be unconstitutional. It is not revealed whether some or all members of the Council of State counselled for or against the President's course of action.

Jim Duffy in 1991 criticised the lack of supporting resources for members of the council; at meetings, they were provided only with a copy of the Constitution. By contrast, prior to the 2013 meeting to discuss the Protection of Life During Pregnancy Bill, a dossier of background information was sent to each member, including legal briefs and news reports.

Although the serving Chief Justice is a member of the council, by convention they do not get involved in substantive discussions on the bill, as they will be involved in the deliberations if the bill does get referred. Therefore, retired Chief Justices and the President of the High Court play a greater role in the discussion. The 2013 meeting was the first at which two serving members of the Supreme Court were present: the term of the Chief Justice was limited to seven years in 1997, and ex-Chief Justice John Murray remained an ordinary member of the Court.

An act which has passed an Article 26 review cannot subsequently have its constitutionality impugned. Jurists have argued this is dangerous, since an Article 26 review can only consider raise hypothetical issues for consideration, and if an unconsidered issue arises later in a real-world case, a judicial review declaration of unconstitutionality is no longer available as a remedy. President Higgins alluded to this argument when he signed the Planning and Development Act 2024 without consulting the Council of State: he noted doubts about the bill's constitutionality, but said they were "probably best tested in a facts specific way rather than in the abstract". Catherine Connolly made similar comments when choosing not to refer the International Protection Bill 2026. Journalist Fionnán Sheahan suggested that Connolly might have called the meeting not envisaging any possibility of referring the bill but rather to provide an opportunity to signal her personal opposition to it.

Date of meeting	Bill (section)	President	Outcome	Notes
8 January 1940	Offences against the State (Amendment) Bill, 1940	Douglas Hyde	Referred and upheld	The government had unofficially supported the referral, as the 1940 act replaced a section of the Offences against the State Act 1939 which had been found unconstitutional, leading to the release of interned IRA members who soon made a major arms raid. W. T. Cosgrave was the only absent member of the council. The Dublin North-West branch of the Labour Party passed a resolution urging William Norton to withdraw from the Council "which exists for the purpose of endorsing Fianna Fáil restrictions on liberty". Hyde instructed attendees not to discuss "political considerations" or "legal arguments", which limited the value of the meeting.
25 February 1943	School Attendance Bill, 1942	Douglas Hyde	Referred and struck down	Hyde's 1940 instruction was not repeated, after De Valera advised Michael McDunphy, Secretary-General to the President, that it was unhelpful.
13 August 1947	Health Bill, 1947	Seán T. O'Kelly	Signed without referral	Absentees were George Gavan Duffy, Douglas Hyde, Timothy Sullivan, W. T. Cosgrave, and Richard Mulcahy.
14 June 1961	Electoral (Amendment) Bill, 1961	Éamon de Valera	Referred and upheld	
6 March 1967	Income Tax Bill, 1966	Éamon de Valera	Signed without referral	All members attended. On 7 March, before the President announced a decision, the Income Tax (Amendment) Bill, 1967 was introduced and passed by the Oireachtas. This pre-emptively cancelled the contentious sections of the original Bill. Next day, the President signed both bills into law.
10 March 1976	Criminal Law (Jurisdiction) Bill, 1975	Cearbhall Ó Dálaigh	Referred and upheld	James Dooge, Cathaoirleach of the Seanad, was absent.
23 September 1976 (a)	Emergency Powers Bill, 1976	Cearbhall Ó Dálaigh	Referred and upheld	The meeting, which discussed two bills, lasted 4 hours. Maurice E. Dockrell was the only absentee. President Ó Dálaigh and Attorney General Declan Costello debated points of law in great detail. Minister Paddy Donegan described the President's decision to refer the bill as a "thundering disgrace", precipitating Ó Dálaigh's resignation. James Dooge later suggested that Ó Dálaigh was more concerned with asserting his right to refer the bill than casting doubt on its Constitutionality. As the bill was formally stated to be emergency legislation, most Constitutional safeguards did not apply to it.
23 September 1976 (b)	Criminal Law Bill, 1976	Cearbhall Ó Dálaigh	Signed without referral	Same meeting as preceding
22 December 1981	Housing (Private Rented Dwellings Bill), 1981	Patrick Hillery	Referred and struck down	
20 December 1983	Electoral (Amendment) Bill, 1983	Patrick Hillery	Referred and struck down	Absentees were Siobhán McKenna, Seán MacEntee, and James Dillon. The bill would have given British citizens the right to vote in all elections in the Republic of Ireland. The Ninth Amendment of the Constitution in 1984 removed the obstacle with regard to Dáil elections but not Presidential elections or referendums (ordinary or constitutional). The Electoral (Amendment) Act, 1985 extended the franchise for Dáil elections.
5 December 1984	Criminal Justice Bill, 1983	Patrick Hillery	Signed without referral	Siobhán McKenna and Máirín Bean Uí Dhálaigh were absent.
22 June 1988	Adoption (No. 2) Bill, 1987	Patrick Hillery	Referred and upheld	Absentees were Tom O'Higgins and Jack Lynch.
30 October 1991	Fisheries (Amendment) Bill, 1990	Mary Robinson	Signed without referral	
1 December 1993	Matrimonial Home Bill, 1993	Mary Robinson	Referred and struck down	
1 March 1994	Criminal Justice (Public Order) Bill, 1993	Mary Robinson	Signed without referral	
16 March 1995	Regulation of Information (Services Outside the State For Termination of Pregnancies) Bill, 1995	Mary Robinson	Referred and upheld	Main article: In re Article 26 and the Regulation of Information (Services outside the State for Termination of Pregnancies) Bill 1995
1 April 1997	Employment Equality Bill, 1996	Mary Robinson	Referred and struck down	15 of 22 members attended, including the Taoiseach. After the bill was struck down, the Employment Equality Act 1998 was passed instead.
6 May 1997	Equal Status Bill, 1997	Mary Robinson	Referred and struck down	Charles Haughey was absent.
30 June 2000 (a)	Planning and Development Bill 1999	Mary McAleese	Referred Part V; upheld	
30 June 2000 (b)	Illegal Immigrants (Trafficking) Bill 1999	Mary McAleese	Referred §§ 5 and 10; upheld	Same meeting as preceding
8 April 2002	Section 24 of the Housing (Miscellaneous Provisions) (No. 2) Bill, 2001	Mary McAleese	Signed without referral	
21 December 2004	Health (Amendment) (No. 2) Bill 2004	Mary McAleese	Referred and struck down	Charles Haughey was the only absentee.
9 May 2007	Criminal Justice Bill 2007	Mary McAleese	Signed without referral	
22 July 2009 (a)	Defamation Bill 2006	Mary McAleese	Signed without referral	19 of 22 members of the council were present; the meeting lasted over 3 hours. See also blasphemy law in Ireland.
22 July 2009 (b)	Criminal Justice (Amendment) Bill 2009	Mary McAleese	Signed without referral	Same meeting as preceding
21 December 2010	Credit Institutions (Stabilisation) Bill 2010	Mary McAleese	Signed without referral	See 2008–2011 Irish banking crisis
29 July 2013	Protection of Life During Pregnancy Bill 2013	Michael D. Higgins	Signed without referral	See Protection of Life During Pregnancy Act 2013. Of 24 members, 21 attended; Mary Robinson, John Bruton and Albert Reynolds were absent, though Robinson and Bruton made written submissions. The meeting ran from 3.15pm to 6.45pm.
29 December 2015	International Protection Bill 2015	Michael D. Higgins	Signed without referral	Liam Cosgrave, Mary Robinson and Gearóid Ó Tuathaigh did not attend. The press release stated the meeting would consider whether: sections 56 and 57 of the bill violated any part of the Constitution; any part of the bill violated Article 42A of the Constitution; section 78 of the bill violated Article 29.6 of the Constitution
11 October 2023	Judicial Appointments Commission Bill 2022	Michael D. Higgins	Referred §§ 9, 10, 39, 40(2), 42, 43, 45, 46, 47, 51, 57 and 58; upheld.	There was concern that the bill restricts the Government's discretion in appointing judges. Higgins said two submissions had been received, one from Michael McDowell. Present were 19 members; absent were Mary McAleese (in Rome), Bertie Ahern (in the US), John Bruton, Enda Kenny, and Ronan Keane. Discussion focused on §§ 47 and 51. Judgment was delivered on 8 December 2023.
15 July 2024	Defence (Amendment) Bill 2024	Michael D. Higgins	Signed without referral	Defence Forces representative groups had expressed concern that sections 11 and 24 of the bill would unduly constrain their activities. The meeting lasted from about 3pm to 5.30pm. Seán Ó Fearghaíl, Brian Cowen and Mícheál Martin were absent.
20 April 2026	International Protection Bill 2026	Catherine Connolly	Signed without referral	The bill, implementing the EU's New Pact on Migration and Asylum, has been criticised by the Irish Human Rights and Equality Commission and Irish Refugee Council as infringing rights of asylum seekers and rights of refugees to family reunification. The meeting lasted from 3pm to 7pm; The Irish Times reported "intense" exchanges. The President expressed significant concerns with the bill but signed it to allow future court challenges via litigation. Of 25 members, 23 attended, with only former Taoisigh Bertie Ahern and Brian Cowen being absent.

== See also ==
- Category:Members of the Council of State (Ireland)
- Council of State
- Privy Council of Ireland
