= Peter Casey =

Irish entrepreneur and television personality

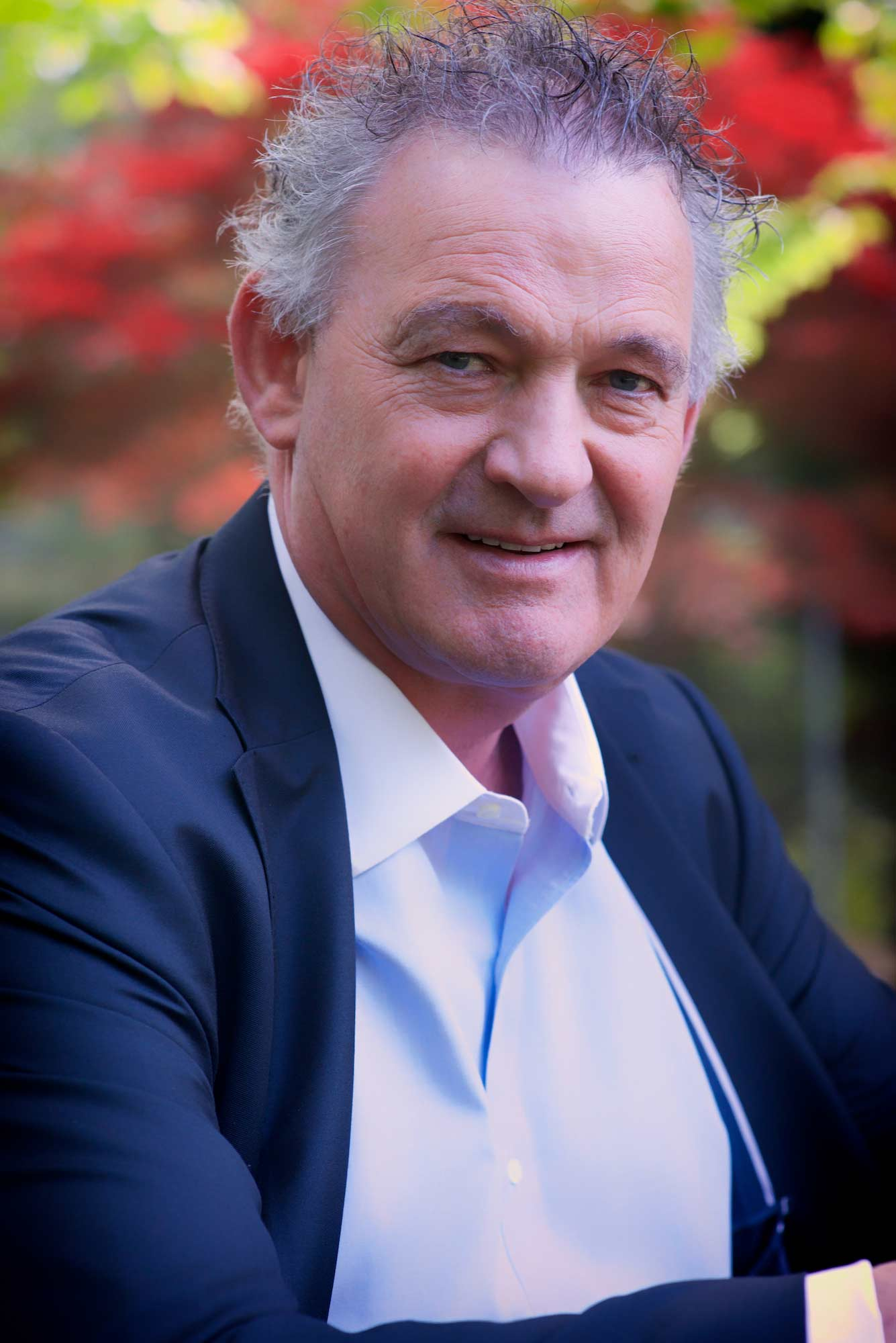
- Born: Peter Joseph Casey; 9 October 1957 (age 68); Derry, Northern Ireland
- Education: St Columb's College
- Alma mater: Aston University
- Occupations: Entrepreneur; Businessman
- Known for: Dragon on the Irish version of Dragons' Den, candidate in the 2018 Irish presidential election
- Political party: Independent
- Spouse: Helen Casey (m. 1990)
- Children: 5
- Website: petercasey.ie

Peter Joseph Casey (born 9 October 1957) is an Irish entrepreneur. He is the founder and former Executive Chairman of Claddagh Resources, a global recruitment and executive search business. From 2012 to 2014 he was a panellist on the RTÉ television programme Dragons' Den, in which he was one of the investors adjudicating business plan pitches.

He has run unsuccessfully for a number of political offices, including as a candidate in the 2018 Irish presidential election, coming second. and in April 2019, as a candidate for that year's European Parliament elections, in the Midlands–North-West constituency.

== Early and personal life ==
Casey was born in Derry on 9 October 1957, the third of nine children (five boys and four girls). His mother Patsy Casey was deputy headmistress at Nazareth House Primary School and his father Leo was bursar at St Columb's College. Casey attended both schools before studying business administration, politics, and economics at Aston University in Birmingham.

He lived in Atlanta, Georgia, with his second wife Helen and their five children until 2016, when they moved to Greencastle, County Donegal. He suffers from degenerative disc disease and has been prescribed medical cannabis to counteract the nausea he experiences when taking opiates.

== Business career ==
Casey joined Rank Xerox UK as a sales representative in 1979, and went on to win a national award for sales in his first year. He moved to Sydney in 1981, and was ranked in the top 5% of sales executives nationally. He became the youngest district manager in Rank Xerox and won Three Oceans Cup as the top Sales Manager in Asia. In 1983, Casey joined Océ Reprographics as state manager for New South Wales. He then rejoined Rank Xerox in 1984 as a branch manager in Sydney, before setting up his first company, The Trinity Group, in 1985. The Trinity Group, an IT contracting firm based in Sydney, was one of five firms awarded a New South Wales government tender to supply temporary staff, the largest contract ever awarded in staffing at the time. Casey sold this business in 1992, and moved back to Ireland for six months before setting out for Atlanta, Georgia where he founded Network Resources, which became Claddagh Resources in 1996. Claddagh Resources place high-level executives across the globe for many Fortune 500 companies including Coca-Cola, SAP, Tata Consultancy Services, Oracle, IBM, and EY. In 2000, the company established its European headquarters in County Donegal which has recently expanded operations to a new Dublin office. Irish America Magazine named him as one of 2007's leading Irish American businessmen.

In a twitter post during his campaign for the 2024 European Parliament elections, Casey admitted to working illegally in America for 18 months.

== Television ==
Ireland's version of the business-related TV programme Dragons' Den selected Casey to appear as an investor for the show's fifth and sixth series. Over the course of the series he made several investments.

== Political career ==
In January 2015, Casey said he would consider running as a candidate at the next Irish general election, though he expressed uncertainty about which constituency he might choose. When pressed to name a constituency he thought he might select Donegal, where he had recently purchased a home, or somewhere in Dublin, where he intended to set up his latest business. "Realistically I'm going to be spending a lot of time in Dublin", Casey said at the time. Casey gave his opinion on the Fine Gael−Labour coalition to The Irish Times. "In fairness to the current Government I think they have performed fairly well", he said. "Some things they have done badly but overall I'd probably give them a B [grade]."

=== 2016 Seanad election ===
He attempted to be elected to Seanad Éireann as part of the Industrial and Commercial Panel in 2016. At his Seanad campaign launch he said he intended to support foreign direct investment, indigenous business development and job creation. In the count, Casey received 14 votes; 113 were required to secure a seat.

=== 2018 presidential election ===
On 30 August 2018, Casey announced his intention to seek a nomination for that year's Irish presidential election. He became the third 'dragon' from the Irish version of Dragons' Den to seek a nomination after Gavin Duffy and Seán Gallagher. Casey uploaded a promotional video entitled "Platform for President of Ireland" to YouTube. He secured the nominations of four local authorities; Kerry County Council, Clare County Council, Limerick City and County Council and Tipperary County Council. He criticised incumbent President Michael D. Higgins for "extolling the virtues" of Fidel Castro and Hugo Chávez.

On 17 October, Casey attracted a mixture of criticism and praise when he made comments on the Irish Independent's Floating Voter podcast regarding social housing that was offered to, and refused by, Irish Travellers in Thurles, County Tipperary. Casey described Irish Travellers as "basically people camping in someone else's land" who are "not paying their fair share of taxes in society". There were calls for Casey to withdraw from the race, including from Traveller activist group Pavee Point. Other candidates condemned Casey's comments. In the Dáil, Tánaiste Simon Coveney referred to Casey's comments as the "lowest common denominator politics" and defended the Government's decision to recognise Irish Travellers as an ethnic minority in 2017, in contrast to Casey's belief that Irish Travellers share their ethnicity with the general Irish population. Casey visited the Thurles housing development for himself on 18 October, under Garda protection, and faced demonstrations by Traveller activist groups. On 19 October, Casey released a statement announcing he was "taking the weekend off from the campaign to think carefully about whether to continue in the race", adding that "I do not want the people of Ireland to elect me as President of Ireland just based on one statement I made". He stated, "there is not a racist bone in my body." He announced that he was staying in the presidential election. Before the traveler comments Casey was polling last of the six candidates with 2 percent of support, he rose in support after the comments.

He also said that in his opinion that Ireland is a "welfare-dependent state" which has led to a "sense of entitlement that's become unaffordable".

Casey finished second to incumbent Michael D. Higgins, securing 342,727 (23.3%) votes.

A day after the election, Casey indicated that he planned to join Fianna Fáil and run for one of the seats in the Donegal constituency in the next general election. Fianna Fáil TD Niall Collins later stated on The Week in Politics that the Fianna Fáil ticket for the constituency was full, saying that Casey should "realise that you can't just rock up to political parties and think that you can get your way". Casey responded by saying "I'm 100% serious. If the consensus after talking to them is they don't want me, I’ll form a new party and I’ll call it the new Fianna Fáil." In February 2019 Casey said that he would run as an independent in the next general election.

=== 2019 European Parliament election ===
In April 2019 he announced he had handed in his nomination papers to contest the 2019 European Parliament election in the Midlands–North-West constituency. In May 2019 while making a speech in Dunboyne, County Meath during the campaign, Casey was filmed declaring "The face of Ireland is changing. People say 'you’re racist'. Of course I'm racist, I'm a very proud Irish man". When questioned about this statement on The Floating Voter Podcast, a series run by the Irish Independent he said that he makes “no apologies” for describing himself as a racist and continued to criticise the EU's policies on migration. He failed to win a seat, finishing fifth in a four-seat constituency.

=== 2020 general election ===
He contested the 2020 general election as an independent candidate for Donegal, and also contested Dublin West, the constituency of incumbent Taoiseach Leo Varadkar. He received 213 first preference votes in Dublin West and was eliminated on the second count. In Donegal, he received 1,142 first preference votes and did not win a seat.

=== 2024 European Parliament election ===
Casey was a candidate in the 2024 European Parliament election for the Midlands–North-West constituency. He received 21,102 (3.1%) first preference votes and was not elected.

=== 2025 presidential election ===
On 2 March 2025, Casey declared his intention to seek nomination from city and county councils to run in the 2025 Irish presidential election.

== Publications ==
Casey wrote a book about the history of the Tata Group. Tata: The World's Greatest Company was published in 2014.

He has also published articles in newspapers and other news publications. Writing for the Irish Independent newspaper, Casey requested voting rights for Irish emigrants. He argued in the Sunday Independent that Ireland has the chance to be at the centre of an online education revolution by embracing massive open online courses (MOOCs). Writing on TheJournal.ie, Casey sounded a cautionary note on Bitcoin after the collapse of virtual currency exchange Mt. Gox. Writing in the Sunday Independent, he told how credit ratings agencies made Ireland's financial crisis "explode" and suggested how it might be stopped from happening again.
