= Jack Sheedy =

Jack Sheedy may refer to:

- Jack Sheedy (Australian rules footballer) (1926–2023), Australian rules footballer
- Jack Sheedy (Gaelic footballer), former Gaelic footballer
- Jack Sheedy (musician), American musician and band leader
