= Riada =

Riada may refer to:

- Liadh Ní Riada (born 1966), Irish politician
- Seán Ó Riada (1931–1971), Irish composer
- Riada Stadium, sports facility in Ballymoney, County Antrim, Northern Ireland
