= Come Dine with Me Ireland =

Irish television programme

- Starring: Various
- Narrated by: Dave Lamb
- Country of origin: Ireland
- Original language: English
- No. of series: 2
- No. of episodes: 50

Production
- Producer: ITV Studios
- Running time: 30 minutes (primetime)

Original release
- Network: TV3
- Release: 6 June 2011 – 13 June 2013

Come Dine with Me Ireland is an Irish television programme, first broadcast on TV3 on 6 June 2011. The show has five amateur chefs competing against each other hosting a dinner party for the other contestants. Each competitor then rates the host's performance with the winner winning a €1,000 cash prize. It is based on the British format Come Dine with Me, which airs globally on various television networks. Between January 2011 to June 2011 TV3 broadcast the UK version at 18:30 each week night. Like the UK version, the Irish version includes an element of comedy through comedian Dave Lamb, who provides a dry and "bitingly sarcastic" narration. A second series of the show, including two celebrity specials, aired as part of TV3's autumn schedule.

The show was later broadcast internationally on Channel 4 and More4 in the UK where it was titled Come Dine with Me Ireland.

== First series ==
| Episodes | Premiered | Location | Winner | Contestants | | | |
|---|---|---|---|---|---|---|---|
| 1–5 | 6 June 2011 | Cork | Helena | David Roche | Louisa Costello | Jamie Knoblauch | Vikki Shorten |
| 6–10 | 13 June 2011 | Dublin | Eimhear | Cora Murphy | Johnny Cox | Eimhear O'Dalaigh | Keith Murphy |
| 11–15 | 18 July 2011 | Limerick | Jane and Graham | Nadia Sakni | Kathleen McKeown | Jane Higgins-Sheedy | Graham Culleton |
| 16–20 | 25 July 2011 | Waterford | Rose | Ronnie Moore | Alexis O'Byrne | Gary Wallace | Rose Jones |
| 21–25 | 1 August 2011 | Galway | Danny | Bruce Henry | Lisa Mulholland | Danny Dowling | Peter O'Neill |
| 26–30 | 29 August 2011 | Dublin | Emma and Martin | Una Quill | Aiden Crevan | Emma Carr | Martin Butler |

== Second series ==
| Episodes | Premiered | Location | Winner | Contestants | | | | |
|---|---|---|---|---|---|---|---|---|
| 1–5 | 24 November 2012 | Dublin; Celebrity Special | Rozanna | Brian Kennedy | Noel Cunningham | Rozanna Purcell | Paul Martin | George McMahon |
| 6–10 | 1 December 2012 | Dublin; Celebrity Special | Pippa and Shane | Madeline Mulqueen | Pippa O'Connor | Holly Sweeney | Michael O'Doherty | Shane Byrne |
| 11–15 | 8 December 2012 | Cavan and Monaghan | Tanya | Tony Sheridan | Pauline Farrelly | Patrick Walsh | Tanya Moany King | Colette McGahern |
| 16–20 | 15 December 2012 | Kerry | Dervil | Audrey Logue-Duggan | Stephen Leane | Melissa Perry | Dervil Fleming | Sean Treacy |
| 21–25 | 12 January 2013 | Sligo | Dimitar | Trish Buckley | Maria Tesler | Monica Cogan | Aoife McGowan | Dimitar Dosev |
| 26–30 | 19 January 2013 | Dublin; Celebrity Special | Joe | Celia Holman-Lee | Geraldine O'Callaghan | Rosanna Davison | Brian McEvoy | Joe Rooney |
| 31–35 | 2 February 2013 | Cork | Mary | Keira O'Connell | Joe Byrne | Mary Rossiter | Billy Galvin | Fiona Buckley |
