= Paul Martin (Irish journalist) =

English editor of an Irish newspaper

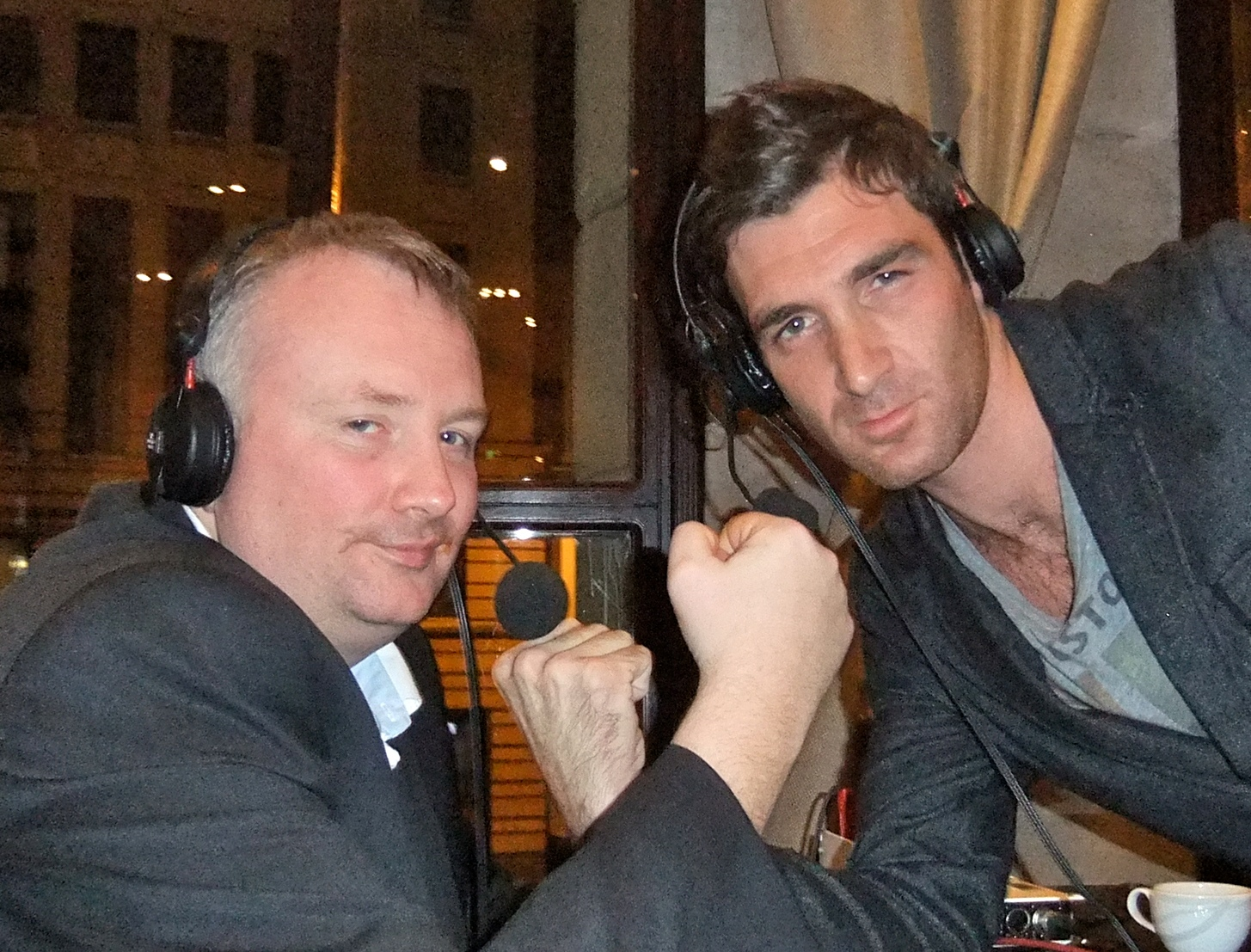
Paul Martin (right) posing with Stephen Nolan in 2010

Paul Martin (born 1976 or 1977) is an English journalist who was editor of the Irish Sunday Mirror. He is also known for his appearances on television, including on Celebrity Come Dine With Me and the boxing show Charity Lords of the Ring, as well as on The Nolan Show on BBC radio.

== Journalism ==
Originally from Windsor in England, Martin moved to Northern Ireland in the 1990s when his father became editor of the Belfast News Letter. Martin began his own career as a showbiz columnist with the Irish Mirror in 1998. By 2011, he was editor of the Irish Sunday Mirror and was described in Hot Press as "the youngest ever editor of a tabloid newspaper in Ireland at 33". Martin was dismissed from his role at the Mirror during layoffs in early 2012. He later worked for the Irish Mail on Sunday.

== Television ==
In January 2012, Martin appeared in the TV3 television cookery show Celebrity Come Dine With Me Ireland. "Tensions" between Martin and the singer-songwriter Brian Kennedy were a talking point of the show. Martin also appeared on the RTÉ reality television show Lords of the Ring.

== Court appearances ==
In 2010, Martin pleaded guilty to driving without reasonable consideration, after he was charged with speeding and reading paperwork while driving. In 2017, he was convicted of benefits fraud. In March 2023, he was convicted of harassment.

In mid-2023, Martin was called to testify in the Mirror Group Newspapers "phone hacking" case. In his judgement, justice Timothy Fancourt questioned the reliability and truthfulness of Martin's testimony in the case.
