= Dragons' Den (Irish TV series) =

- Genre: Reality show
- Presented by: Richard Curran
- Starring: Gavin Duffy; Barry O'Sullivan; Alison Cowzer; Eleanor McEvoy; Chanelle McCoy
- Country of origin: Ireland
- Original language: English
- No. of series: 8

Original release
- Network: RTÉ One
- Release: 19 February 2009 – 2017

Dragons' Den is an Irish television series, presented by Richard Curran, based on the Japanese franchise Dragons' Den. It first aired in February 2009 and ran for eight series, until 2017.

== History ==
The first episode was broadcast on 19 February 2009.

The third season aired on RTÉ One with Norah Casey as the new Dragon. Toward the end of the season, episodes showed the Dragons on tour visiting their past investments.

For the fourth season, Seán O'Sullivan, co-founder of Kinsale-based Avego Ltd, replaced Seán Gallagher. A live, interactive Sixth Dragon Game was developed to be played whilst watching the show, in which viewers are able to decide if they're "in" or "out" as the pitches unfold. The Sixth Dragon Game is the first live interactive game for an Irish TV show.

The eighth series of Dragons Den included three female Dragons for the first time. Chanelle McCoy, wife of Tony McCoy, was new to the Den that year, replacing Seán O'Sullivan.

== Dragons ==
The dragons throughout the series' run were:.

Seat order	Season 1	Season 2	Season 3	Season 4	Season 5	Season 6	Season 7	Season 8
1	Niall O'Farrell				Peter Casey		Eamonn Quinn	Chanelle McCoy
2	Bobby Kerr				Ramona Nicholas		Eleanor McEvoy	
3	Sarah Newman		Norah Casey		Barry O'Sullivan		Gavin Duffy	
4	Gavin Duffy						Alison Cowzer	
5	Seán Gallagher			Seán O'Sullivan		Eamonn Quinn	Barry O'Sullivan	

Former Dragon Seán Gallagher was a candidate in the 2011 presidential election, coming in second to Michael D. Higgins. Three current or former Dragons, Peter Casey, Seán Gallagher and Gavin Duffy, were candidates in the 2018 presidential election, coming in second, third and sixth (last), respectively.
