= Orlaith Carmody =

- Born: Kilmacud, Dublin, Ireland
- Education: Dublin Institute of Technology; Dublin City University
- Occupations: Author; Journalist
- Board member of: HRM; RTÉ; Ablevision Ireland; HCCI
- Spouse: Kieran Gleeson (m. 1983; died 1989) Gavin Duffy (m. 1993)
- Website: Official website

Orlaith Carmody is an Irish businesswoman, author, news reporter and co-founder of Gavin Duffy and Associates (formerly Media Training), along with her husband and business partner, Dragons' Den investor Gavin Duffy.

== Career ==
Carmody was previously a newscaster and reporter at LMFM and Century Radio. As a director of Aerga Productions, she won a Screen Training Ireland bursary to attend the Entertainment Master Class international media leadership programme. She spoke at TEDxTallaght in 2013, TEDxDCU in 2015 and at the SME Assembly 2014 in Naples, Italy.

Carmody was a board member of RTÉ from 2010 until 2015, HRM Recruit, and Ablevision Ireland, and is a founder member and president 2014–15 of the Irish chapter of the International Entrepreneurs' Organization (EO). She is chairperson of Home and Community Care Ireland (HCCI), a fellow of the Irish Institute of Training and Development and a member of the Institute of Directors.

== Books ==
- Perform As A Leader. Ballpoint Press Limited. 24 September 2015. ISBN 9780993289200.
- Without You, Living With Loss. Ballpoint Press Limited. 26 April 2018.
