= Charity Lords of the Ring =

- Charity Lords of the Ring
- Genre: Reality competition, boxing
- Created by: Screentime ShinAwil
- Directed by: Roy Heaybred
- Presented by: Lucy Kennedy; Barry McGuigan; Brian Ormond
- Voices of: Jimmy Magee
- Theme music composer: Mickey Joe Harte; Billy Farrell
- Country of origin: Ireland
- Original language: English
- No. of seasons: 1
- No. of episodes: 4

Production
- Executive producers: Barry McGuigan; Larry Bass; Brian Peter
- Producer: Isobel Nolan
- Running time: 60 minutes

Original release
- Network: RTÉ One
- Release: 15 August – 22 August 2009

Charity Lords of the Ring is an Irish reality television competition, broadcast on RTÉ One. Presented by Lucy Kennedy and ex-boxer Barry McGuigan, the four-part series follows ten personalities compete for their charity of choice, in the field of boxing.

Charity Lords of the Ring is broadcast over four episodes on 15 August, 18 August, 19 August and 22 August 2009. It is produced by Screentime ShinAwil and sponsored by Sona Vitamins. Over €100,000 is anticipated to be donated to the charities involved, with €26,000 going to the winner. The show marks the television production debut of Brian Ormond. One of the contestants left the show before broadcasts began due to a potentially life-threatening swelling to the brain.

The show's finalists were Paul Martin and Sean Gallagher. The final was attended by several females including socialite and model Rosanna Davison, pop singer, television personality, and sometime glamour model Michelle Heaton as well as Pippa O'Connor and Tara Sinnott. Seán Gallagher, despite having only partial eyesight, won the series.

== Launch ==
The series was launched in late July 2009. The contestants were revealed during an episode of Saturday Night with Miriam.

== Format ==
The programme features the experiences of ten celebrities through recruit training, with assistance from Tim Witherspoon, Peter Taylor and Katie Taylor. All ten contributors had to take a half day medical before being allowed compete on the show. It later emerged that RTÉ had asked if the contestants could avoid striking each other above their necks for fear that a violent "gore-fest" might affect the ratings. This idea was dismissed because it was thought the celebrities would look like "total wimps". Some injuries were caused during the programme, including a broken nose for Jack Sheedy from Lee Sharpe and an injured thumb and bruised ribs for Seán Gallagher from Alan Shortt.

The first programme was aired on 15 August 2009. In the first programme, four contestants were selected to take part in first round of contests. Two of the competitors were eliminated. The second programme was of similar format, another two had to leave. Over €100,000 will be divided among the ten selected charities. Professional referees are involved in the show as is the Boxing Union of Ireland and Brian Peters Promotions.

On 19 August, World Champion boxer Bernard Dunne appeared on the show.

The final took place in front of a ticketed audience in City West on 20 August 2009. The event also featured an exhibition match involving Katie Taylor.

In 2009 it was reported that British broadcaster BBC was interested in the format.

== Contestants ==
On 25 July 2009, the competitors were announced for the programme. They include Fair City actor Maclean Burke, Apprentice UK contestant Ben Clarke, celebrity businessman Seán Gallagher, showbiz reporter Paul Martin, television presenter John McGuire, journalist Joe O'Shea, children's television presenter Rob Ross, former Manchester United association footballer Lee Sharpe, retired Gaelic footballer Jack Sheedy and comedian Alan Shortt. O'Shea said he lost more than one stone in weight during training for the show.

Ben Clarke left the show after 2 episodes after being diagnosed with a potentially life-threatening swelling to his brain. He had complained of headaches whilst training and was told by neurosurgeons that he might die if he continued. Clarke was replaced by Ray Shah and was subsequently seen drowning his sorrows with Champagne in local celebrity haunt Krystle with Louis Walsh and Amanda Brunker. Clarke had caused controversy earlier on in the show when he hit the tabloid headlines by breaking the strict 'no drinking' rules after sneaking out of the City West bootcamp to go to out with Dublin model and socialite Niamh Walsh who he started dating during the show.

Rob Ross was boxing for the charity Children at Risk in Ireland (CARI).

Co-host Barry McGuigan's diary was published in the Evening Herald.

Contestants	Charity	Amount Raised	Status
Seán Gallagher	National Council of Blind	€17,350	WINNER
Paul Martin	ARC Cancer Support	€16,100	RUNNER-UP
Maclean Burke	Baby Max—Wings of Love Foundation	€5,100	ELIMINATED
Ben Clarke	The Irish Anaphylaxis Campaign	—	INJURED
John McGuire	Our Lady's Children's Hospital, Crumlin	€5,100	FORCED QUIT
Joe O'Shea	Royal National Lifeboat Institution	€17,350	INJURED
Rob Ross	The CARI Foundation	€8,600	ELIMINATED
Ray Shah	Temple Street Children's University Hospital	€9,850	ELIMINATED
Lee Sharpe	Lee Sharpe Foundation	€8,600	ELIMINATED
Jack Sheedy	Barrettstown Gang Camp Fund	€9,850	INJURED
Alan Shortt	Mercy Hospital Cork Foundation	€11,100	ELIMINATED

== Reception ==
Only 10 per cent of each episode was devoted to actual boxing, with the focus being more on fitness, a strict diet and loss of weight in an effort said to appeal to a family audience. Before broadcast, the series was compared by the Sunday Tribune newspaper to "Operation Transformation parading in boxing trunks" but this has been denied by sources. Paul Whitington, writing in the Irish Independent, reminded potential viewers that "they're celebrities, so watch out for the ones that panic mid-fight and start shouting, 'Not the face, not the face!'".

Claire Byrne, writing in the Evening Herald, described it as "the best idea anyone has had all year -- throw a group of celebrities into a ring and tell them to beat the heads off each other". Byrne bemoaned the lack of female contestants, suggesting that politicians Mary Hanafin and Mary Harney, beauty queens from pageants such as The Rose of Tralee, Mary from Dungloe and Miss Ireland, a possibly nude Nell McCafferty, actress Amy Huberman and the hosts of The Afternoon Show could have helped solve the matter. Michael O'Doherty, writing in the same publication, ridiculed the contestants who were "short, rotund, and believe that poncing around in a ring for ten minutes is going to make them 'look hard'", whilst also criticising Paul Martin and Joe O'Shea by telling his followers to "ignore their wordy, self-serving bollox". David Robbins, writing in the Irish Independent, described it as "the lowest point in popular culture since the Circus Maximus", pointing out that RTÉ, having already placed celebrities in kitchens, hotels, GAA dressing rooms and sinking ships, was now encouraging "celebrities [to beat] each other up" and that this "may reduce the available pool of contestants for future shows, and thus hasten the end of the genre as a whole".

After the series had begun, there were reviews too. Katie Byrne in the Evening Herald said RTÉ were "deluded in terms of what constitutes a celebrity"; however, she admitted it had "come so close to genius" but was lacking in irony. In the same publication, George Byrne dubbed it "RTE's celebrity boxing atrocity", opining that "quite simply, the fact that charitable causes may benefit financially from something is no excuse for bad television programmes...or rotten records" before comparing the motives to those of television programmes Fáilte Towers and Celebrity You're a Star and the musical attempts of Queen at Live Aid, records released in aid of the Bradford City stadium fire in the United Kingdom in 1985 and the Zeebrugge ferry disaster in 1986 as well as "the dreadful "Let's Make It Work"" which "we were forced to endure [...] on what seemed like an hourly basis on RTÉ radio".
