= 2018 Irish presidential election =

- 26 October 2018
- Opinion polls
- Registered: 3,401,681
- Turnout: 43.9% (▼12.2 pp)
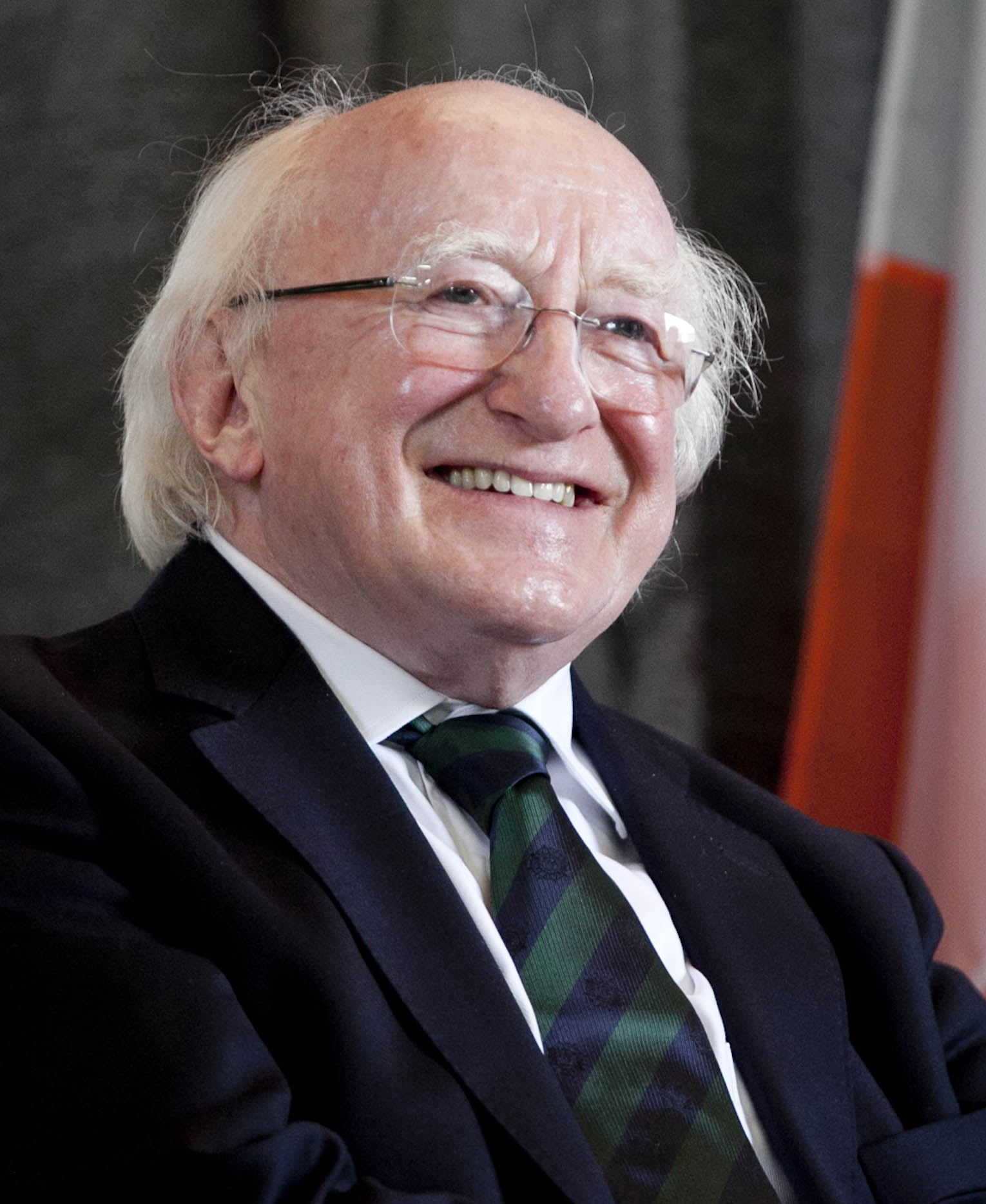

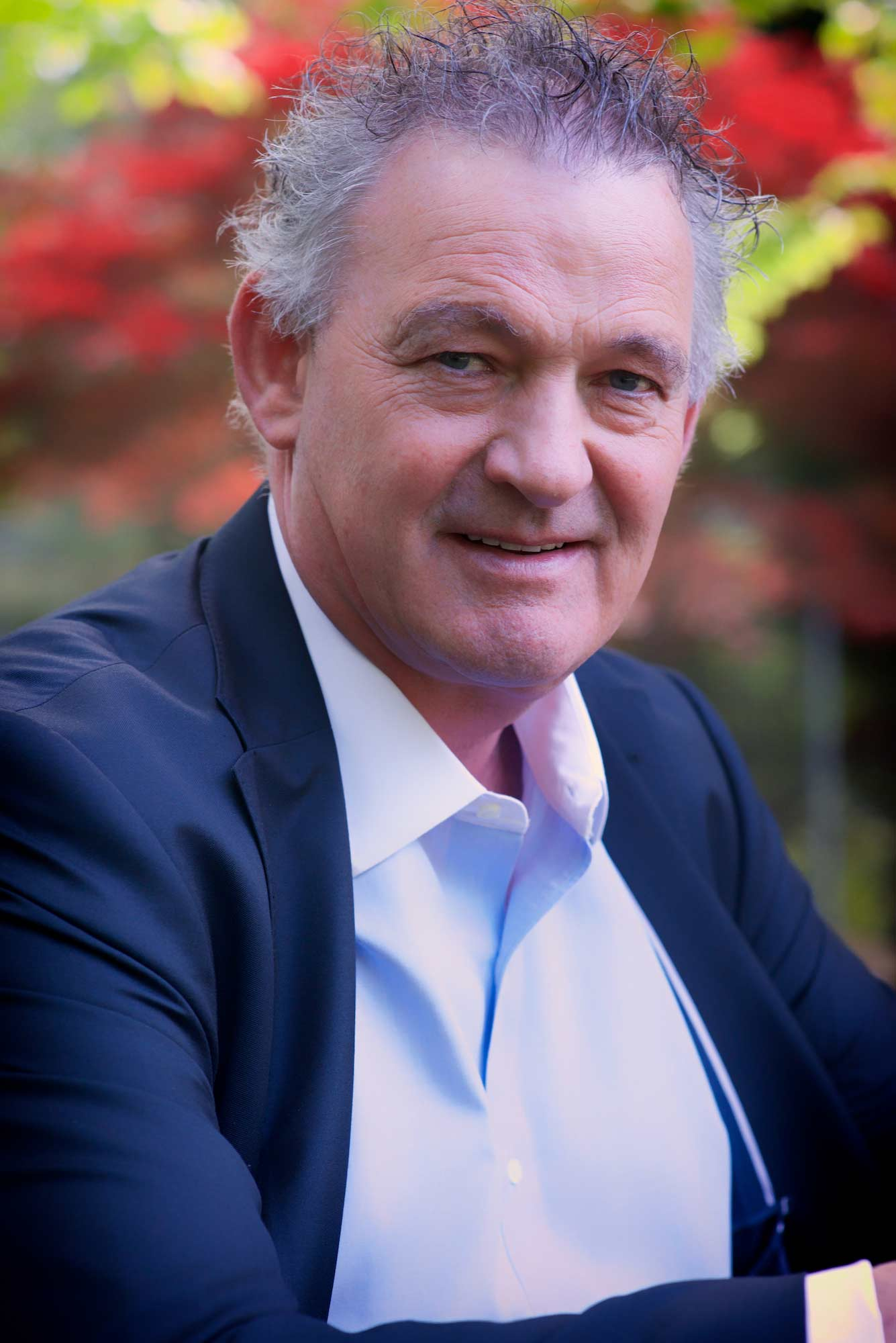

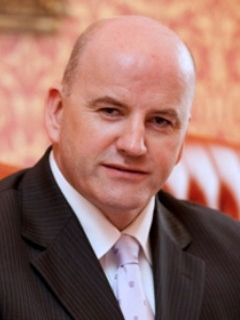

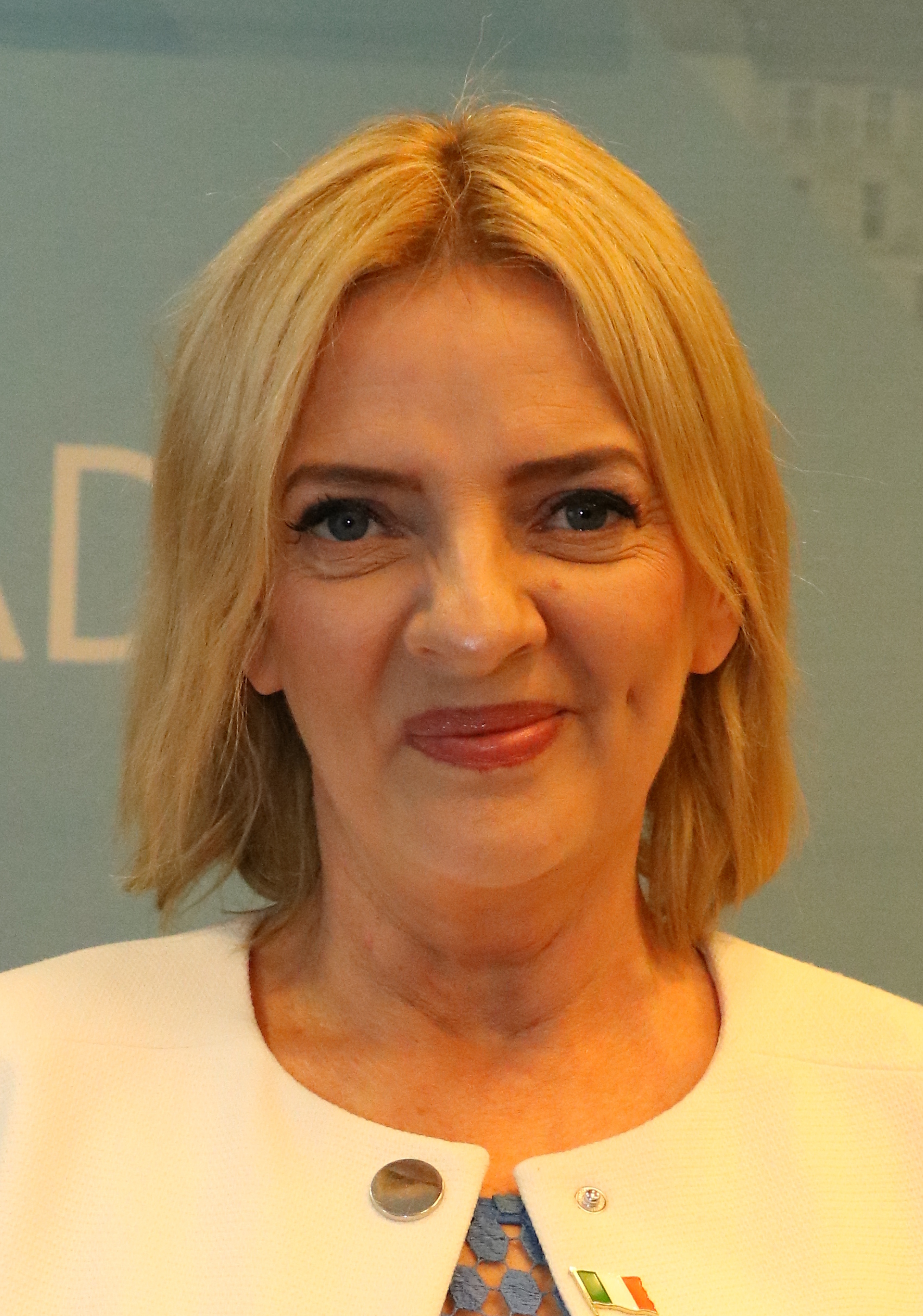

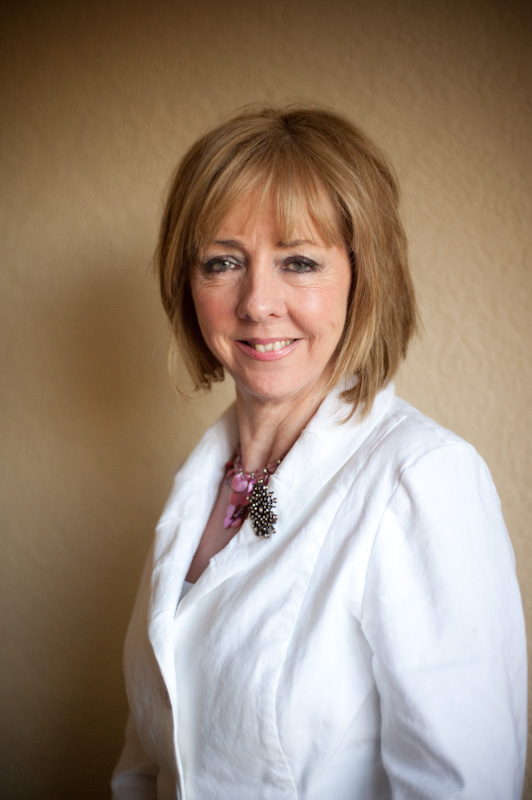

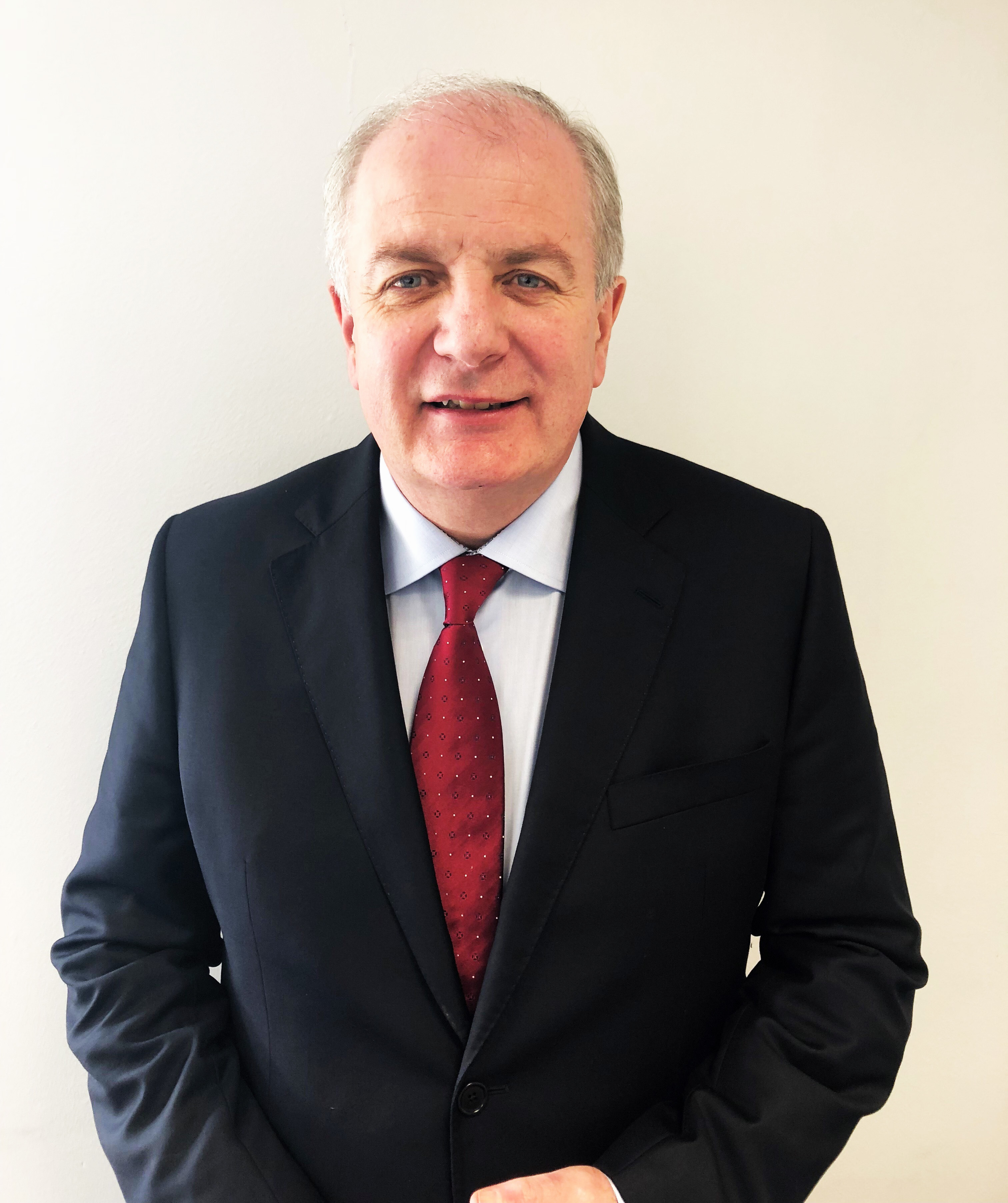
Nominee	Michael D. Higgins	Peter Casey	Seán Gallagher
Party	Independent	Independent	Independent
1st preference	822,566 (55.81%)	342,727 (23.25%)	94,514 (6.41%)
Nominee	Liadh Ní Riada	Joan Freeman	Gavin Duffy
Party	Sinn Féin	Independent	Independent
1st preference	93,987 (6.38%)	87,908 (5.96%)	32,198 (2.18%)
- Results by constituency: Higgins: 35–40% 40–45% 45–50% 50–55% 55–60% 60–65% 65–70% 70–75%
President before election
Michael D. Higgins
Independent
Elected President
Michael D. Higgins
Independent

A presidential election was held in Ireland on Friday, 26 October 2018. President Michael D. Higgins, who was elected in 2011 with the support of the Labour Party, was seeking re-election to a second term as an independent. This was the first time since the 1966 election that an incumbent president faced a contest for a second term. Higgins was re-elected on the first count with nearly 56% of the vote, becoming the first president since Éamon de Valera to win a second term in a contested election (Seán T. O'Kelly in 1952, Patrick Hillery in 1983 and Mary McAleese in 2004 had been re-elected unopposed). He was inaugurated for his second term on 11 November.

The election was held on the same date as a referendum on blasphemy.

== Procedure ==
To stand for election as president, candidates must:

- be a citizen of Ireland
- be at least 35 years of age
- be nominated by:
  - at least twenty of the 218 serving members of the Houses of the Oireachtas (parliament), or
  - at least four of the 31 county or city councils, or
  - themselves, in the case of a former or retiring president who has served one term.

If a member of the Oireachtas or a County or City council nominate more than one candidate, only the first nomination paper received from them will be deemed valid. Presidential elections are conducted in line with Article 12 of the Constitution and under the Presidential Elections Act 1993, as amended. The President of Ireland is elected through Instant-runoff voting. All Irish citizens entered on the current electoral register are eligible to vote. Under the Electoral (Amendment) Act 2011, there is a spending limit by each candidate of €750,000. Candidates who are elected or who reach 12.5% of the vote on their elimination are entitled to a reimbursement of expenses up to €200,000.

== Nomination process ==
On 28 August the Minister for Housing, Planning and Local Government, Eoghan Murphy, signed the order for the presidential election, specifying the nomination period as between 10 a.m. on 30 August and 12 noon on 26 September 2018.

On 10 July 2018, incumbent president Michael D. Higgins declared that he would exercise his right to nominate himself as a candidate for the presidential election. Higgins had said in 2011 that he intended to serve one term only, but changed his mind over the course of his term. Higgins's website and social media accounts became active on 17 September, having been dormant since his inauguration in November 2011. He formally nominated himself on 24 September.

Sinn Féin was the only party to select a candidate. With 28 Oireachtas members (22 TDs and six Senators), the party could nominate a candidate without the need for additional nominations from independents to reach the requirement of 20 Oireachtas members, as they had required in 2011. Nearly all other parties in the Oireachtas supported the re-election of Michael D. Higgins. People Before Profit declined to support any candidate in the election. Independent TD Michael Fitzmaurice had tried to gather the support of other Independent TDs and Senators to support a candidate, but was unsuccessful. Nineteen were willing to be involved in his effort to find a candidate, one short of the twenty required to be nominated. Eleven Oireachtas members signed a nomination form for Gemma O'Doherty, nine short of the required number.

18 local authorities passed resolutions supporting a particular candidate, while the remaining 13 either passed no resolution or passed a resolution declining to nominate any candidate. Candidates needed the support of at least four local authorities to be a candidate in the election.

Name	Occupation	Resolutions	Councils
Peter Casey	Businessman	4	Clare, Kerry, Limerick, Tipperary
Gavin Duffy	Businessman	4	Meath, Carlow, Wicklow, Waterford
Joan Freeman	Senator	4	Cork City, Fingal, Galway County, Galway City
Seán Gallagher	Businessman	5	Roscommon, Mayo, Leitrim, Wexford, Cavan
Gemma O'Doherty	Journalist	1	Laois
No candidate		13	Dublin City, Dún Laoghaire–Rathdown, Louth, Kilkenny, Monaghan, Offaly, South Dublin, Westmeath, Kildare, Cork County, Donegal, Longford, Sligo

Others who had sought a nomination from local authorities were: Norma Burke, William Delaney, Patrick Feeney, John Groarke, Patrick Melly, Marie Goretti Moylan, Sarah Louise Mulligan, Kevin Sharkey, James Smyth, David Doucette, and John O'Hare. Sharkey withdrew his name from consideration during the nomination period, calling for the nomination of Gemma O'Doherty. Senator Gerard Craughwell had said that he would seek the nomination if Higgins were otherwise to be unopposed. However, in July he announced that he would not contest the presidential election, in light of Sinn Féin's decision to run a candidate. He also cited the financial costs of running for the presidency as a factor in his decision not to contest the election. Despite Fianna Fáil support for the incumbent Michael D. Higgins, a few of the party's Councillors urged the leadership to nominate Galway West TD Éamon Ó Cuív, but he declined to allow his name to proceed as he would risk his party membership.

== Candidates ==
Six candidates contested the presidential election, having been selected by their parties or having received sufficient council nominations.

- Peter Casey, a businessman from Derry who formerly appeared on the Irish version of the television series, Dragons' Den for the show's fifth and sixth series.
- Gavin Duffy, businessman from Kildare and has been a dragon on Dragons' Den since it first broadcast in 2009.
- Joan Freeman, founded Pieta House, a suicide intervention charity, in 2006. She served as its director until 2014. In 2016, she was nominated to be a member of Seanad Éireann by the Taoiseach, sitting as an Independent. She was supported by Rural Independent TDs Michael Collins, Michael Harty and Mattie McGrath.
- Seán Gallagher, a businessman from Cavan who came second in the 2011 presidential election. He was a dragon investor in the first three seasons of Dragons' Den.
- Michael D. Higgins, incumbent president.
- Liadh Ní Riada, MEP for South since 2014, was confirmed as the Sinn Féin candidate on 16 September.

== Debates ==
2018 Irish presidential election debates
Date	Broadcaster	Moderator	Participants					
P Participant A Absent invitee			Casey	Duffy	Freeman	Gallagher	Higgins	Ní Riada
27 September	RTÉ Radio 1	Áine Lawlor	P	P	P	A (Note: Higgins did not participate due to scheduling conflicts, and Gallagher did not participate because Higgins did not take part.)	A	P
13 October	RTÉ Radio 1	Cormac Ó hEadhra	P	P	P	P	P	P
15 October	RTÉ One TV	Claire Byrne	P	P	P	A	A	P
17 October	Virgin Media One	Pat Kenny	P	P	P	P	P	P
23 October	RTÉ One TV	David McCullagh	P	P	P	P	P	P
24 October	Virgin Media One	Matt Cooper / Ivan Yates	P	P	P	P	A	P

== Opinion and exit polling ==
Color key:

Exit poll

Last date of polling	Commissioner	Polling firm	Source	Casey	Duffy	Freeman	Gallagher	Higgins	Ní Riada
26 October 2018	RTÉ	Red C		20.7%	2.0%	6.3%	5.5%	58.1%	7.4%
26 October 2018	The Irish Times	Ipsos MRBI		21%	2%	6%	7%	56%	8%
16 October 2018	The Sunday Times	Behaviour & Attitudes		2%	4%	6%	11%	69%	7%
12 October 2018	The Irish Times	Ipsos MRBI		2%	4%	5%	12%	66%	11%
10 October 2018	Paddy Power	Red C		1%	4%	6%	14%	70%	5%
16 September 2018	The Sunday Business Post	Red C		1%	6%	3%	15%	67%	7% (Note: Figure for "Sinn Féin candidate". Poll conducted before Ní Riada's candidacy was announced.)
24 August 2018	Irish Daily Mail	Ireland Thinks		(Note: Poll conducted before Casey's candidacy was announced.)	10%	3%	11%	65%	11%

== Result ==
The count began at 09:00 on Saturday 27 October.

2018 Irish presidential election
Candidate	Nominated by	% 1st Pref	Count 1
Michael D. Higgins	Himself as incumbent president	55.81	822,566
Peter Casey	County and City Councils	23.25	342,727
Seán Gallagher	County and City Councils	6.41	94,514
Liadh Ní Riada	Oireachtas: Sinn Féin	6.38	93,987
Joan Freeman	County and City Councils	5.96	87,908
Gavin Duffy	County and City Councils	2.18	32,198
Electorate: 3,401,681 Valid: 1,473,900 Spoilt: 18,438 Quota: 736,951 Turnout: 1,492,338 (43.9%)

First preference vote
Higgins	55.8%
Casey	23.3%
Gallagher	6.4%
Ní Riada	6.4%
Freeman	6.0%
Duffy	2.2%

=== Constituency results ===
First preference votes by constituency
Constituency	Higgins		Casey		Gallagher		Ní Riada		Freeman		Duffy	
Constituency	Votes	%	Votes	%	Votes	%	Votes	%	Votes	%	Votes	%
Carlow–Kilkenny	25,717	52.0%	13,929	28.2%	3,506	7.1%	2,419	4.9%	2,636	5.3%	1,265	2.6%
Cavan–Monaghan	16,749	44.3%	7,023	18.6%	6,771	17.9%	4,167	11.0%	2,063	5.5%	1,000	2.6%
Clare	22,639	54.7%	11,722	28.3%	2,289	5.5%	2,186	5.3%	1,969	4.8%	617	1.5%
Cork East	20,388	53.6%	9,340	24.5%	2,625	6.9%	2,705	7.1%	2,283	6.0%	716	1.9%
Cork North-Central	18,851	54.0%	8,382	24.0%	1,977	5.7%	3,112	8.9%	2,010	5.8%	545	1.6%
Cork North-West	17,638	51.5%	8,092	23.6%	3,199	9.3%	2,824	8.2%	1,855	5.4%	630	1.8%
Cork South-Central	24,161	60.5%	7,323	18.3%	2,164	5.4%	3,072	7.7%	2,554	6.4%	642	1.6%
Cork South-West	16,860	55.1%	6,582	21.5%	2,374	7.8%	2,489	8.1%	1,635	5.3%	680	2.2%
Donegal	15,052	38.1%	12,952	32.8%	3,684	9.3%	4,524	11.4%	2,563	6.5%	747	1.9%
Dublin Bay South	20,765	71.5%	3,433	11.8%	1,116	3.8%	1,221	4.2%	1,884	6.5%	626	2.2%
Dublin Bay North	32,198	63.9%	8,009	15.9%	2,500	5.0%	3,315	6.6%	3,372	6.7%	1,010	2.0%
Dublin Central	10,094	66.7%	1,692	11.2%	529	3.5%	1,749	11.6%	868	5.7%	203	1.3%
Dublin Fingal	27,039	63.1%	7,505	17.5%	2,369	5.5%	2,290	5.3%	2,643	6.2%	986	2.3%
Dublin Mid-West	17,196	59.3%	5,128	17.7%	1,433	4.9%	1,978	6.8%	2,734	9.4%	526	1.8%
Dublin North-West	14,728	62.6%	3,737	15.9%	1,121	4.8%	1,932	8.2%	1,546	6.6%	451	1.9%
Dublin Rathdown	21,704	68.7%	4,385	13.9%	1,487	4.7%	1,141	3.6%	2,177	6.9%	711	2.2%
Dublin South-Central	17,930	65.0%	3,794	13.8%	1,105	4.0%	2,282	8.3%	2,039	7.4%	441	1.6%
Dublin South-West	28,151	62.2%	8,324	18.4%	2,237	4.9%	2,584	5.7%	3,011	6.7%	929	2.1%
Dublin West	17,545	62.1%	4,887	17.3%	1,430	5.1%	1,842	6.5%	2,053	7.3%	514	1.8%
Dún Laoghaire	31,513	70.2%	5,872	13.1%	2,044	4.6%	1,596	3.6%	2,866	6.4%	1,000	2.2%
Galway East	18,011	53.4%	11,227	33.3%	1,379	4.1%	1,029	3.1%	1,545	4.6%	516	1.5%
Galway West	29,612	62.4%	10,821	22.8%	1,783	3.8%	2,161	4.6%	2,445	5.1%	660	1.4%
Kerry	25,078	50.1%	13,752	27.5%	2,856	5.7%	4,253	8.5%	3,102	6.2%	1,037	2.1%
Kildare North	23,103	61.3%	7,210	19.1%	2,258	6.0%	1,523	4.0%	2,751	7.3%	844	2.2%
Kildare South	14,766	56.9%	5,819	22.4%	1,829	7.0%	1,307	5.0%	1,619	6.2%	633	2.4%
Laois	13,754	49.8%	8,419	30.5%	1,845	6.7%	1,443	5.2%	1,464	5.3%	718	2.6%
Limerick County	15,262	48.1%	10,865	34.2%	1,756	5.5%	1,438	4.5%	1,762	5.6%	658	2.1%
Limerick City	18,904	57.7%	7,845	23.9%	1,557	4.8%	1,964	6.0%	1,917	5.9%	578	1.8%
Longford–Westmeath	18,024	47.5%	12,005	31.6%	2,873	7.6%	2,089	5.5%	2,122	5.6%	829	2.2%
Louth	26,291	58.4%	7,223	16.0%	2,934	6.5%	4,175	9.3%	2,291	5.1%	2,101	4.7%
Mayo	20,642	49.8%	12,850	31.0%	2,235	5.4%	2,107	5.1%	2,663	6.4%	937	2.3%
Meath East	16,754	56.7%	6,064	20.5%	2,060	7.0%	1,654	5.6%	1,883	6.4%	1,142	3.9%
Meath West	14,522	54.1%	5,917	22.0%	1,943	7.2%	1,847	6.9%	1,727	6.4%	904	3.4%
Offaly	13,977	47.0%	9,253	31.1%	2,672	9.0%	1,444	4.9%	1,691	5.7%	673	2.3%
Roscommon–Galway	14,246	45.1%	10,918	34.5%	2,270	7.2%	1,617	5.1%	1,850	5.9%	713	2.3%
Sligo–Leitrim	20,601	49.1%	11,132	26.5%	3,749	8.9%	3,172	7.6%	2,475	5.9%	859	2.0%
Tipperary	24,917	45.5%	20,149	36.8%	3,077	5.6%	2,827	5.2%	2,723	5.0%	1,106	2.0%
Waterford	18,609	52.2%	8,822	24.7%	2,530	7.1%	2,837	8.0%	2,025	5.7%	847	2.4%
Wexford	27,020	55.5%	11,818	24.3%	3,499	7.2%	2,939	6.0%	2,272	4.7%	1,161	2.4%
Wicklow	31,555	63.0%	8,507	17.0%	3,449	6.9%	2,733	5.5%	2,820	5.6%	1,043	2.1%
Total	822,566	55.8%	342,727	23.3%	94,514	6.4%	93,987	6.4%	87,908	6.0%	32,198	2.2%

== Analysis ==
The Irish Times's analysis of its exit poll data said that Michael D. Higgins seemed on course to be comfortably re-elected on the first count, after leading in the opinion polls throughout the campaign, despite "considerable criticism over his use of the Government jet, expensive hotel accommodation on overseas visits and the lack of transparency over how an annual €300,000 allowance for his office was spent". It attributed the expected low turnout to "a lack of public enthusiasm for the contest that was evident throughout the campaign".

It ascribed Peter Casey's second place to a late surge of support following his criticisms of Travellers and his claim that Ireland had "a growing culture of welfare dependency", and it added that at some polling stations pollsters reported that "he was attracting as many voters as Mr Higgins". It said that Seán Gallagher appeared to be down 22% on his 2011 figure of 29%, but that the biggest disappointment would probably be for Sinn Féin, whose candidate Liadh Ní Riada's expected 8% was well down on its general election result, and only a third of the party's support in the latest Irish Times/Ipsos MRBI Opinion poll. It described Senator Joan Freeman's expected performance as "just 6 per cent of the vote", and Gavin Duffy's expected result as him having "flopped completely, ending a miserable campaign with just 2 per cent of the vote".

When analysing the Red C/RTÉ exit poll, RTÉ Political Correspondent Martina Fitzgerald said that the data showed that President Higgins was very popular among voters regardless of age and gender but was particularly popular among women and younger votes despite the debate about his age, which most voters saw as irrelevant. The most important factor cited by voters was the candidates' track record and expertise, while the finances and salary of the president were the least important factor.

Fitzgerald added that "the real political story" was that the result was "a disastrous election" for Sinn Féin, and "a serious blow" for which party leader Mary Lou McDonald would have to take "full responsibility". Fitzgerald also noted that the combined total of the three former Dragons Den judges (Casey, Gallagher, and Duffy) was very similar to Gallagher's vote in 2011, suggesting that vote had held up, but that Casey had taken most of it this time.
