= Bellewstown =

Village in County Meath in Ireland

Bellewstown Baile an Bheileogaigh
- Village
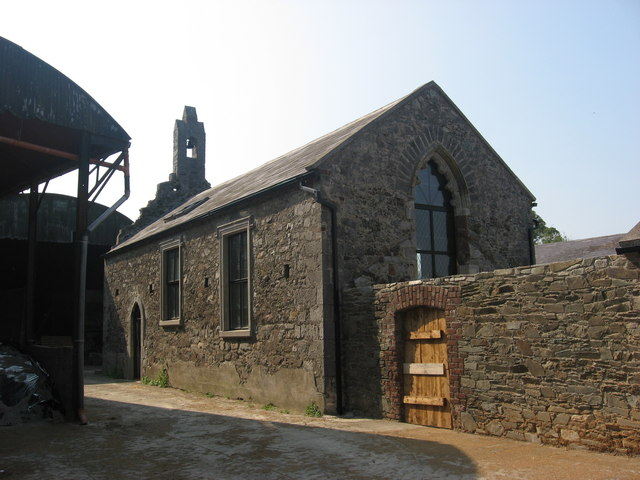
- Medieval church in Bellewstown townland

- Location in Ireland
- Coordinates: 53°38′38″N 6°20′53″W
- Country: Ireland
- Province: Leinster
- County: Meath
- Time zone: UTC+0 (WET)
  - Summer (DST): UTC-1 (IST (WEST))
- Irish Grid Reference: N862596

Bellewstown (Irish: Baile an Bheileogaigh) is a townland and village located 8 km south of Drogheda, on the Hill of Crockafotha in County Meath in Ireland. Bellewstown townland, which is in the electoral division of Ardcath and the civil parish of Duleek, had a population of 499 as of the 2011 census. It takes its name from the Anglo-Irish Bellew family, who were the dominant local landowners from the thirteenth to the seventeenth century.

== History ==
=== Built heritage ===
Evidence of ancient settlement in the area includes a number of cist, standing stone, ring ditch and ringfort sites in the townlands of Bellewstown, Collierstown and Hilltown.

Bellewstown Castle, a 15th-century building that is now in ruin, is historically associated with the Bellew family. Its ruins stand near Bellewstown House. Also within the grounds of Bellewstown House is a former church.

=== Horseracing ===
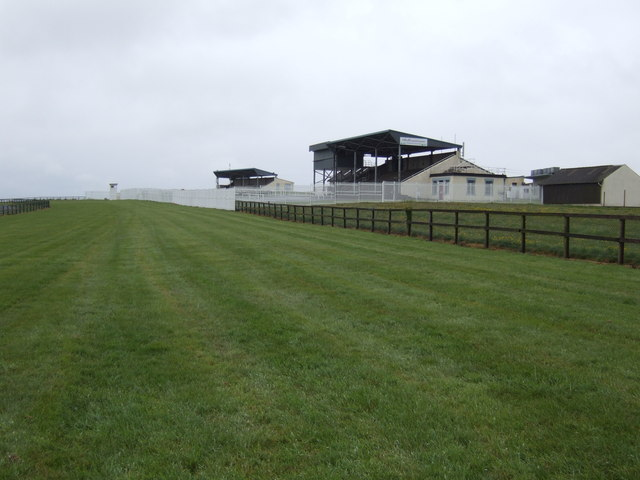
Bellewstown Racecourse

The tradition of summer horse racing at Bellewstown Racecourse dates to at least the 18th century, and the first record of racing here appears in The Dublin Gazette and the Weekly Courier in August 1726. In 1780, George Tandy, a former mayor of Drogheda and brother of James Napper Tandy, persuaded George III to sponsor a race at Bellewstown. The race was called His Majesty's Plate and was valued at £100. There was also previously a cricket ground in the middle of the race track.

Racing continues to occur on an annual basis, taking place during the course of the summer. While there was previously just one meeting a year at Bellewstown (in July), as of the 21st century, four meetings are held each year. These include one day in April, three days in July, three days in August and two days in September. The track is a one-mile and one-furlong left-handed course, featuring both flat and hurdle racing.

== Amenities ==
Amenities in Bellewstown village include a primary school, Catholic church, pub, horse racecourse, and golf course.

The modern Catholic church in Bellewstown, Saint Thérèse's church in Collierstown townland, was built c. 1977. It is in the Roman Catholic Diocese of Meath.

The local national (primary) school, also dedicated to Saint Thérèse of Lisieux, had an enrollment of approximately 100 pupils as of 2024. The current school building, built in the 1960s, replaced an earlier 19th century building which is now known as the "old school hall".

The local Gaelic Athletic Association (GAA) club, Duleek/Bellewstown GAA, won the Meath Intermediate Football Championship in 2005.

== People ==
- Gavin Duffy, entrepreneur and businessman, lived in Bellewstown.
- The family of actress Sharon Horgan and rugby-player Shane Horgan previously lived in the area.
- The 19th century Dublin-born poet James Clarence Mangan, who had several pen names, sometimes used the name "P.V. M'Guffin, Bellewstown".

== See also ==
- List of towns and villages in Ireland
