= Joe O'Shea =

Irish journalist

- Occupations: Journalist, Broadcaster
- Employer(s): Freelance journalist working for RTÉ, Newstalk, Today FM, The Irish Independent newspaper, The Irish Daily Star

Joe O'Shea (Irish: Seosáf/Seosamh Ó Sé) is an Irish broadcaster and journalist. He lives and works in Dublin and in the past made regular appearances on Irish radio and television.

== Career ==
Joe O'Shea was educated at St Mary's of the Isle Convent, Sullivan's Quay CBS, Cork, and Deerpark CBS, Cork. O'Shea began his career as a trainee with The Star newspaper. In 1991, he became a staff journalist and over the next few years he interviewed celebrities, including Bono, David Bowie and Colin Farrell. During the nineties he covered some of Ireland's biggest stories, such as the negotiation of the Good Friday Agreement (GFA). When he travelled to Rwanda in 1998 with aid agency Trocaire, he spent a fortnight conducting interviews with the survivors of genocide and chronicling the devastating effects of the civil war.

Towards the end of the decade, O'Shea was assigned to follow the Republic of Ireland national football team on all away games in search of a news angle. His personal highlight came in Japan and Korea in 2002 when he spent three weeks on the road immersed in Roy Keane and ticket scams. O'Shea began writing more colour and feature pieces for The Star. He became a freelance journalist. He pursued his interest in classic cars by acting as Motoring Correspondent for The Sunday Business Post. He also penned the 'Newshound' column for In Dublin magazine on media issues.

After writing articles appearing in The Irish Independent and The Evening Herald, he was a guest on radio for Newstalk 106 and TV with Setanta Sports. O'Shea was offered a job co-presenting a new magazine/lifestyle programme - Seoige and O'Shea - with Grainne Seoige in October 2006. In 2007, he made television appearances on other shows such as Charity You're A Star and The Late Late Show. In June 2008, O'Shea left RTÉ and continued to work as a freelance journalist for various national news organisations.

In August 2009, he appeared in the RTÉ programme, Charity Lords of the Ring.

Joe O'Shea works in Dublin and makes appearances on radio shows such as The Marian Finucane Show and The Last Word With Matt Cooper.

== Personal life ==
In September 2006, O'Shea was charged in Stradbally in County Laois with driving under the influence of alcohol; he received a ban from driving for one year upon entering a guilty plea in court proceedings in Portlaoise on Friday, 12 January 2007.
