= Seán Gallagher =

Irish businessperson and reality television personality

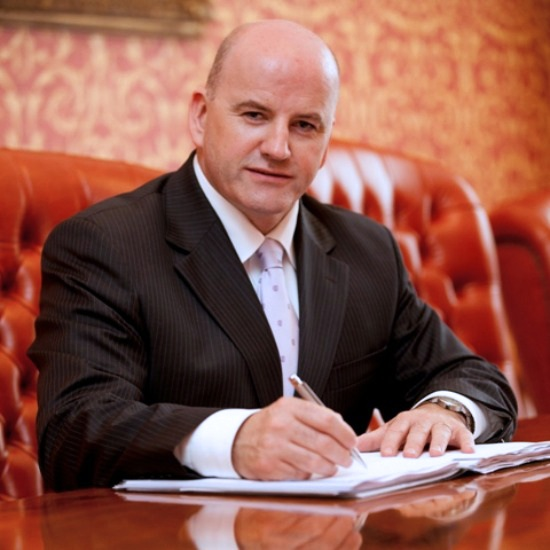
- Born: 7 July 1962 (age 64); Monaghan, Ireland
- Education: Teagasc Agricultural College; Maynooth University; Dundalk Institute of Technology; University of Ulster
- Known for: Candidate for President of Ireland, co-founder of Smarthomes
- Television: Dragons' Den (2009–11); Charity Lords of the Ring (2009)
- Political party: Independent (since 2011)
- Other political affiliations: Fianna Fáil (until 2011)
- Spouses: Irene McCausland (m. 1997; div. 1999) Patrica Gallagher (m. 2010)
- Children: 2
- Website: seangallagher.com

Seán Gallagher (born 7 July 1962) is an Irish businessman and former reality television personality. He was a co-founder in 2000 of Smarthomes, which after initial success, failed in 2008–2010, and Gallagher departed in 2010–11. He was a panellist on RTÉ's Dragons' Den from 2009 to 2011. Gallagher was an active member of Fianna Fáil for 30 years, from 1981 to 2011, and sat on its National Executive twice (from 1985 to 1987, and from 2009 to 2011). He spent much of his career before Smarthomes working in Fianna Fáil, and in the Irish public service. Gallagher ran as an independent candidate in the 2011 presidential election, finishing second to Michael D. Higgins. He ran again in the 2018 presidential election, finishing third.

== Early life and education ==
Gallagher was born in Monaghan in July 1962. (Note: Several articles on Seán Gallagher list him incorrectly as being born in Ballyhaise, County Cavan; however, he was born in 17 Devin Reilly Terrace on the Pound Hill in Monaghan.) His father, John, was from Killygordon in East Donegal. Seán was raised in a family of six in Ballyhaise, County Cavan. Gallagher was effectively blind up until age 3 as a result of congenital cataracts. While corrective surgery improved his sight, Gallagher describes himself as being "visually impaired".

From September 1974 to June 1980, Gallagher was educated at Saint Mary's National School in Glin and Saint Patrick's College in Cavan. Following his Leaving Certificate in June 1980, he attended the Teagasc Agricultural College in Ballyhaise, County Cavan, where he received a National Certificate in Agriculture in June 1981. He said that he then worked on the college farm until a car accident in June 1983, which required a period of rehabilitation. (Note: In interviews, Gallagher refers to his year-long recovery from the car accident as being motivated by a new-found commitment to physical fitness.) In September 1985, Gallagher went to Maynooth University where he earned a Diploma in Youth Work and Community Development in June 1987.

During his tenure as assistant CEO of the Louth Country Enterprise Board (1995–2000), Gallagher studied for a Diploma in Management in the Dundalk Institute of Technology from 1997 to 1999, after which he completed an MBA in 2000 at the University of Ulster. (Note: The InterTradeIreland Annual report of 2007 listed Gallager as Deputy CEO of the Board from 1995-2000; however, Gallagher has used the term Assistant CEO.)

== Public service career ==
Much of Gallagher's early career from 1988 to June 2000, involved working with various Irish State bodies and departments. It is not known whether these roles were full-time or part-time, but he has also said that he was a fitness instructor and massage therapist in the 1990s.

From 1988 to 1990, Gallagher said he worked as a Project Co-ordinator for the National Youth Council of Ireland and the Department of Health, and that he was the author of Drink Awareness for Young People, Ireland's first national alcohol education programme. From 1990 to 1993, Gallagher worked as a full-time political advisor to then Fianna Fáil TD and Minister for Health Rory O'Hanlon. (Note: Gallagher says in interviews that it was while he was working at the Department of Health that he met Rory O'Hanlon) After O'Hanlon lost his cabinet minister position when Albert Reynolds came to power in Fianna Fáil in 1992, Gallagher said that he was an Enterprise Officer for the Blanchardstown Area Development Partnership from 1993 to 1995.

In May 1995, aged 32, Gallagher moved to Blackrock in County Louth where he served as the assistant CEO of the Louth County Enterprise Board. His role was to promote and support the development of micro businesses including the provision of financial support, training and mentoring. As part of this role, he served as a director of the Louth Tourism Company and Louth Leader Rural Development Agency.

== Business career ==
=== Smarthomes Limited (2000–2010) ===
In June 2000, Gallagher left the Louth County Enterprise Board (LCEB) to set up a company called Home Wiring Systems Limited (HWSL) with electrical tool-maker, Derek Roddy. HWSL's plan was to provide electrical systems for homes, such as broadband, heating and alarm systems. In 2001, HWSL got a start-up loan of €25,395 from the LCEB. (Note: The Louth County Entreprise Bord ("LCEB") seed-loan would be a source of controversy during the 2011 Presidential election as it was revealed that Smarthomes asserted that the loan was not repayable as it was "left" in HWSL; however, in an RTÉ interview during the campaign, Gallagher stated that when the LCEB asserted their rights in 2005, that a confidential settlement was reached in 2008. On 12 October 2011, Gallagher said on RTÉ's Drivetime programme that "If I was doing it again perhaps I would have done it differently.") In September 2002, Gallagher and Roddy decided to rebrand HWSL and transferred it into a new limited liability company, Smarthomes Limited. Smarthomes won business awards, including the Deloitte "Fast 50 Award" in 2005, and Gallagher was a finalist in the 2006 Ernst & Young "Entrepreneur of the Year". The company raised €750,000 in loans from Business Expansion Scheme ("BES") investors in 2005, and raised another €830,000 in grant-loans from Irish State agencies during 2004–2007.

Smarthomes's turnover grew from around €1 million in 2004 to €7 million by 2006, when it made a peak pre-tax profit of €500,000, a 7% margin. In December 2006, the then Fianna Fáil Taoiseach Bertie Ahern opened their new offices, at which Gallagher announced he planned to invest €10 million and create 100 jobs. However, in 2007, the business broke even, and in 2008 and 2009 it lost €652,000 and €540,000 respectively. Despite the losses, filed accounts showed that Gallagher and Roddy drew €542,500 from the company in 2008, and €316,000 in 2009. (Note: Journalists revealed the Smarthomes accounts showed that the combined Irish State grant loans of €830,000, and the €750,000 of BES investor loans, exceeded the total cumulative profits that Smarthomes made up to 2010, and exceeded the total earnings (salary, rent and royalties) that Gallagher, and his co-founder Derek Roddy, took from the business,) There were issues with the BES investors who had not realised that the company was paying rent and royalties to the directors, but by March 2010, they had converted their loans into equity in the company, and a new plan was agreed, with the premises changed and patents returned from the directors to the company. Gallagher left Smarthomes in 2010 and sold his shares in 2011.

Smarthomes returned to modest profitability in 2011–12, and while the company was still trading in 2017, the main focus of the directors is their climote business. (Note: Gallagher also owned shares in climote but also sold out his holding in 2011)

=== State boards (2007–2012) ===
On 13 December 2007, Fianna Fáil Minister for Enterprise, Trade and Employment Mary Coughlan appointed him to the Board of InterTradeIreland, a North-South Irish trade body, until 2011. There was some controversy that his appointment came after the successful re-election of Fianna Fáil parliamentary party chairman, Séamus Kirk, in the May 2007 general election, for whom Gallagher was Director of Elections; and also that InterTradeIreland invested €41,970 into Smarthomes in 2007, and that Gallagher had attended only 22 of the 36 Board meetings during his tenure.

In January 2010, after Gallagher was elected to the Fianna Fáil National Executive in 2009, Mary Coughlan appointed him to the Board of FÁS, until 2012. In June 2010, Gallagher was also appointed by Fianna Fáil Minister for Transport, Noel Dempsey, to be Chair of the Drogheda Port Company, which he held until 2012.

=== Irish television (2009–2016) ===
In October 2008, Gallagher was announced as an investor on the RTÉ One version of Dragons' Den. He continued as an investor in the 2009, 2010 and 2011 series. In August 2009, he took part in the Charity Lords of the Ring series, an amateur celebrity boxing reality television show, representing the National Council for the Blind of Ireland, and went on to win the show and earn €17,350 for his charity. (Note: In 2007, Gallagher listed that he was a 1st dan black-belt in both judo and karate) In March 2016, Gallagher appeared as a celebrity chef on TV3's cooking show, The Restaurant.

=== Consulting (since 2009) ===
As Smarthomes was wound-down in 2009, Gallagher began to concentrate on business consulting, motivational speaking and journalism, with resultant fees paid through his firm, Beech House Training and Consultants Limited ("BHTC"). BHTC came under scrutiny during the 2011 Presidential campaign, and in October 2011, Professor of Management at UCD, Niamh Brennan, said that she had a "bad vibe", having read the BHTC accounts. (Note: The accounts of Gallagher's consulting company, BHTC, listed a Director Loan of €82,829, which was 70% of BHTC's net assets. The Revenue Commissioners prohibit Director Loans in excess of 10% of net assets because of their use in tax avoidance (e.g. where the Director avoids paying company tax and dividend tax, or salary tax (depending how the Director extractes the profits), by giving themselves a loan, and then never paying it back, and usually winding down the company who writes off the loan.) The accounts also indicated that Gallagher had funded at least one of his Dragons' Den investments through BHTC fees, (Note: The Irish times would later report that some of the Dragons' Den companies did not receive the investment that Gallagher had promised.) and journalists questioned the level of Gallagher's net worth. In February 2018, Gareth Sheridan, the 28-year-old founder of vitamin patch start-up Nutribrand, appointed Gallagher to its board. In September 2018, it was reported that Gallagher was one of two Directors of a regional industrial-office leasing company called Clyde Real Estate, and that his consulting company for motivational speaking was, Business Matters Limited.

== Political career ==
=== Fianna Fáil (1981–2011) ===
The Candidate Profile for Connacht/Ulster from the 9th Ógra Fianna Fáil youth conference in November 1984 lists Gallagher, age 22, and states that he joined Fianna Fáil in 1981, and by 1984 was Chair of Cavan Ógra Comhairle Dáilcheantair (constituency council). Various references are made to Gallagher later becoming the national head of Ógra Fianna Fáil, and in a letter in 2009 to the Fianna Fáil party when seeking election to the Fianna Fáil National Executive, Gallagher said: "I first served on the National Executive with Charlie Haughey from 1985 to 1987 when I was head of Ógra Fianna Fáil nationally". After leaving Ógra, Gallagher said: "I later worked full time for the party in Fianna Fáil headquarters, supporting members like yourself in raising much-needed funds for the work of the party."

From 1990 to 1993, Gallagher worked as a full-time political advisor to then Fianna Fáil TD and Minister for Health Rory O'Hanlon. O'Hanlon was part of Charles Haughey's cabinet, and lost his cabinet minister position when Albert Reynolds came to power in Fianna Fáil in 1992. In October 2011, Gallagher said of his time with O'Hanlon: "I had a network of contacts built up within departments so good that other ministers would ring me to get things done. I just knew my way around the system". In October 2011, Gallagher stated that he: "... did not have any connection with the party between 1993 [...] and 2007 when he acted as a campaign manager for Louth's Séamus Kirk".

In June 2006, Gallagher, while still CEO of SmartHomes, became Director of Elections for Fianna Fáil Louth TD and parliamentary party chairman, Séamus Kirk, whose seat was under threat from Sinn Féin. In the May 2007 general election, Kirk was successfully re-elected and topped the poll, even beating his fellow Fianna Fáil running mate, the then Minister for Justice, Dermot Ahern. In July 2008, Gallagher hosted a €5,000 per-head fund-raising dinner for 40 people in the Crowne Plaza Hotel in Dundalk, County Louth, for the new Taoiseach, Brian Cowen. The event became a source of controversy in the 2011 presidential election as to whether Gallagher was specifically requesting, and collecting, cheques, or whether they were voluntary.

In 2009, Gallagher campaigned, and was elected to the National Executive of Fianna Fáil representing the Louth branch. On 5 January 2011, he formally resigned from the National Executive. Gallagher had also resigned from his local Louth Fianna Fáil Ravensdale Cummann in March 2010.

=== 2011 presidential campaign ===
In May 2011, it was reported that Gallagher would likely seek a nomination in the 2011 Irish presidential election. In June 2011, it was reported Gallagher approached Fianna Fáil Oireachtas members to run as an independent candidate, but with a "semi-detached" relationship to the party. In June 2011, he received the fourth and final required nomination, of a local council, and he handed in his nomination papers on 27 September 2011. Gallagher was one of seven candidates, and launched his campaign at the Royal Hibernian Academy in Dublin on 2 October 2011. Throughout his campaign, Gallagher adopted the use of social media as an alternative to posters. He had the highest number of followers of the candidates on Facebook, and the second highest on Twitter.

On 25 September 2011, the first of six major RED C and MRBI opinion polls (see main Wikipedia article) in the campaign, ranked Gallagher 2nd last at 11%. The first of eight television debates took place on 30 September 2011, and appearing on The Late Late Show alongside the other candidates, Gallagher confirmed that he came from "the Fianna Fáil gene pool". The Irish Times described his performance as: "he struggled to give his idea play". On 6 October 2011, the second main opinion poll, from RED C, ranked Gallagher 2nd, behind Higgins, at 20%.

As Gallagher rose in the polls in October, scrutiny came on his business dealings, and Fianna Fáil heritage (which were linked via State grants, and State Board appointments). Attention came to the €830,000 in State grants Smarthomes received, which exceeded to the total profits the company made for Gallagher; and that his previous employer, the LCEB, had seed-funded his business with €25,395; and that Gallagher had tried to avoid repaying this seed-funding. His appointment to three State Boards, some after being elected to the Fianna Fáil National Executive in 2009, were noted, however, Gallagher responded that he donated some of the State Board fees to charity. After avoiding criticising Fianna Fáil, Gallagher said: "the party had moved away from the grassroots". His post-Smarthomes dealings revealed inappropriate Director loans of €82,829, which had to be repaid. Journalists questioned whether he was a millionaire, and noted some Dragons' Den investments were paid via fees.

After three further television debates on 4, 11 and 12 October 2011, a 16 October RED C poll, ranked Gallagher 1st with 39% of the poll, with Higgins 2nd with 27%. After three television and radio debates on 18, 22 and 24 October, Gallagher would maintain this rank, and increase polling to 40% by the final RED C poll on 22 October 2011, and the final MRBI poll on 23 October 2011.

On Monday, 24 October, three days before the election, Gallagher suffered a severe setback in the final debate on Pat Kenny's The Frontline, watched by an audience of 900,000. Martin McGuinness said that he had been contacted by an unnamed man (later verified as fuel-seller, Hugh Morgan), who would confirm that Gallagher had collected a cheque for €5,000 after a 2008 Fianna Fáil fund-raiser, which Gallagher had previously denied. Later in the show, Kenny read out a tweet live on air, subsequently proven to be from an anonymous source, that the unnamed man would hold a press conference next day. (Note: The Irish Independent reported: At 10.39pm, a tweet was posted to a Twitter feed "#aras11". The Twitter account responsible was "@mcguinness4Pres". It read: "The man that Gallagher took the cheque from will be at a press conference tomorrow. #aras11.") McGuinness resumed his attack, and Gallagher, acknowledging he knew the man, called him a "convicted criminal and fuel smuggler". Gallagher then addressed the audience and, as The Irish Times would later chronicle: "he also made comments that had very unfortunate overtones for a man denying Fianna Fáil connections – including 'no recollection' and 'if he gave me an envelope'".

On 25 October, Hugh Morgan made a statement claiming Gallagher collected the cheque from him at Morgan Fuels in Armagh. Gallagher denied this event occurred. Martin McGuinness said that he had "done a service" to the Irish people in bringing the affair to light. Further scrutiny came on the accounts of his consulting business, BHTC, from audience questions the previous night, and his Director's loan of €82,829 from BHTC. On 25 October, UCD Professor Niamh Brennan described the BHTC accounts to The Irish Times as having a "bad vibe". On 25 October, on Pat Kenny's radio show, Gallagher questioned the motives of an audience member who asked about the €82,829 loan on The Frontline; however, a few minutes later, Glenna Lynch, a then-unknown housewife and mother of three with no political affiliations, (Note: Glenna Lynch also owned a small interior design business and was familiar with Irish revenue rules, and typical abuses, regarding Director Loans. She would go on to join the Social Democrats and unsuccessfully contest the general election in 2016.) called into the show to reveal herself as that audience member saying: "I think it's extraordinary that Seán believes normal people, voters, don't have the right to ask a question".

On 27 October 2011, Gallagher received 28.5% of first preference votes in the election, leaving him in second place behind Michael D. Higgins. On 30 October, The Guardian, chronicling the reasons for Gallagher's fall in support, reported that a final RTÉ poll showed that 28% of Irish voters changed their mind in the last week of the campaign, with 58% of those switching from Gallagher.

On 7 March 2012, the Irish Broadcasting Authority of Ireland upheld Gallagher's complaint about unfair treatment regarding how RTÉ handled the unverified tweet on the final Pat Kenny debate. On 19 December 2017, it was reported that RTÉ agreed to pay Gallagher a sum of €130,000 as part of a confidential legal settlement arising from the final Pat Kenny debate.

=== 2018 presidential campaign ===
In August 2018, Gallagher announced that he would seek a nomination to run for president again and contest the 2018 presidential election. On 10 September 2018, with the support of four county councils, Gallagher became the second candidate in the 2018 election to secure a nomination, after the incumbent Michael D. Higgins (who has the right to nominate himself). On 16 September 2018, the second of 5 major opinion polls, ranked Gallgher a distant second place with 15%, compared to Higgins at 67%; which was to be the highest polling Gallagher would reach in the campaign.

On 23 September 2018, in an interview with the Irish Independent, when asked if he had campaigned on the social issues he had made part of his presidential platform, Gallagher replied: "No, I didn't actively campaign....I can't campaign on every issue". When asked about what he would do with the €130,000 settlement he won from RTÉ (see above), he replied: "The money is there for my kids' education" (he has two children).

Gallagher raised the expenses of the office as an issue, and on 29 September 2018 told the Irish Independent that he would stay in Irish embassies when abroad rather than luxury hotels. On the first radio debate on 10 October 2018, Gallagher said he was concerned at the "extravagance attached to the office", and that "We've heard stories of €3,000 a night hotels, the issue for us as taxpayers, we're not in a position to see these figures". On 12 October 2018, Gallagher called for a public audit of all presidential expenses, which the State rejected as already covered under existing transparency guidelines. On 12 October 2018, Gallagher praised Higgins calling him an "inspiring politician", that the people of Ireland were tired of negative politics, and that Gallagher wanted to "succeed Michael D, not replace".

On 10 October 2018, the Irish Times when reviewing the candidates campaign videos, described Gallagher's video as an "electrifying exercise in grand patriotic baloney", and that it was "Fashioned lovingly from the finest garbage". On 15 October 2018, The Irish Times reported Gallagher wrote to Higgins in the Áras regarding his inability to attend all televised debates calling Higgins "insulting to the people of Ireland and shows contempt for the integrity of our electoral process". The final major opinion poll before the election placed Gallagher second, but his polling had fallen to 11%, with Higgins at 69%.

On 26 October 2017, Gallagher received 6.41% of the first preference vote, which ranked him in third place behind Peter Casey with 23.25%, and Michael D. Higgins with 55.81%.

== Personal life ==
Gallagher married Irene McCausland in 1997, while he was working with the Louth Country Enterprise Board, and they divorced and annulled in 1999. In 2010, he married Patricia "Trish" O'Connor, a cosmetic company representative, from Kanturk, Co Cork. They used to live in Blackrock, County Louth, but now live in Delgany, County Wicklow, and have two children. Gallagher's profile in the board report of the InterTradeIreland 2007 accounts, noted that Gallagher was a 1st dan black-belt in both judo and karate.

== Bibliography ==
- Gallagher, Sean (2018). Secrets to Success: Inspiring Stories from Leading Entrepreneurs. Mercier Press Limited. ISBN 978-1781175255.
