= Jack Sheedy (Gaelic footballer) =

Gaelic football player and manager

Personal information
- Native name: Seán Ó Shíoda (Irish)
- Born: Dublin, Ireland
- Height: 1.91 m (6 ft 3 in)

Sport
- Sport: Gaelic football
- Position: Midfield
Club
- Years: Club
- Lucan Sarsfields
Inter-county
- Years: County
- 1984-1995: Dublin
Inter-county titles
- Leinster titles: 5
- All-Irelands: 0
- NFL: 2
- All Stars: 1

Jack Sheedy is a former Gaelic footballer who played for the Dublin-based club Lucan Sarsfields and for the Dublin county team.

== Playing career ==
Sheedy made his Championship debut for Dublin against Meath in the first round of the Leinster Senior Football Championship in 1991, after having been a panellist on the Dublin team beaten by Kerry in 1984. The series famously finished after four games (three replays), with Dublin losing by a point. He scored a goal in the opening game against Meath and finished the series with 1-03. He went on to win five Leinster championships with Dublin in 1984,1992, 1993, 1994 and 1995. He won an All Star for Dublin in 1994, the same year that he won his fourth Leinster championship and then an all-Ireland senior football final defeat to Down; a game which finished on a scoreline of 0–13 to 1–12. He suffered a cruciate ligament injury in 1995, ruling him out of an All-Ireland medal with Dublin that year.

Sheedy won two National Football League finals with Dublin. The first final was against Kildare in his first senior football year. He then won his second title in 1993 against Donegal in a game the Tír Conaill men forced to a replay, which Dublin eventually won. Sheedy also won a North American championship with the Wolfe Tones GAA club in Chicago in 1997, a team that included Kevin O'Brien of Wicklow and Gregory Macarton of Down. Sheedy won the All-Ireland Masters Football Championship with Dublin in 2004 when he captained Dublin to victory over Leitrim.

== Managerial career ==
Sheedy was manager of the Edenderry senior team in County Offaly. He won a Division Two League title as manager of Edenderry in June 2009. On 7 December, he resigned from managing Edenderry.

He managed Moorefield of Kildare to a Kildare Senior Football Championship on 17 October 2010.

In October 2013, Sheedy was confirmed as the new manager of the senior Longford county team, stepping down in July 2015.

He is currently the manager of the St Sylvester's senior football team in Malahide, County Dublin.

== Other work ==
In August 2009, he appeared in the RTÉ One series Charity Lords of the Ring.
