= Gavin Duffy =

Irish entrepreneur and businessman

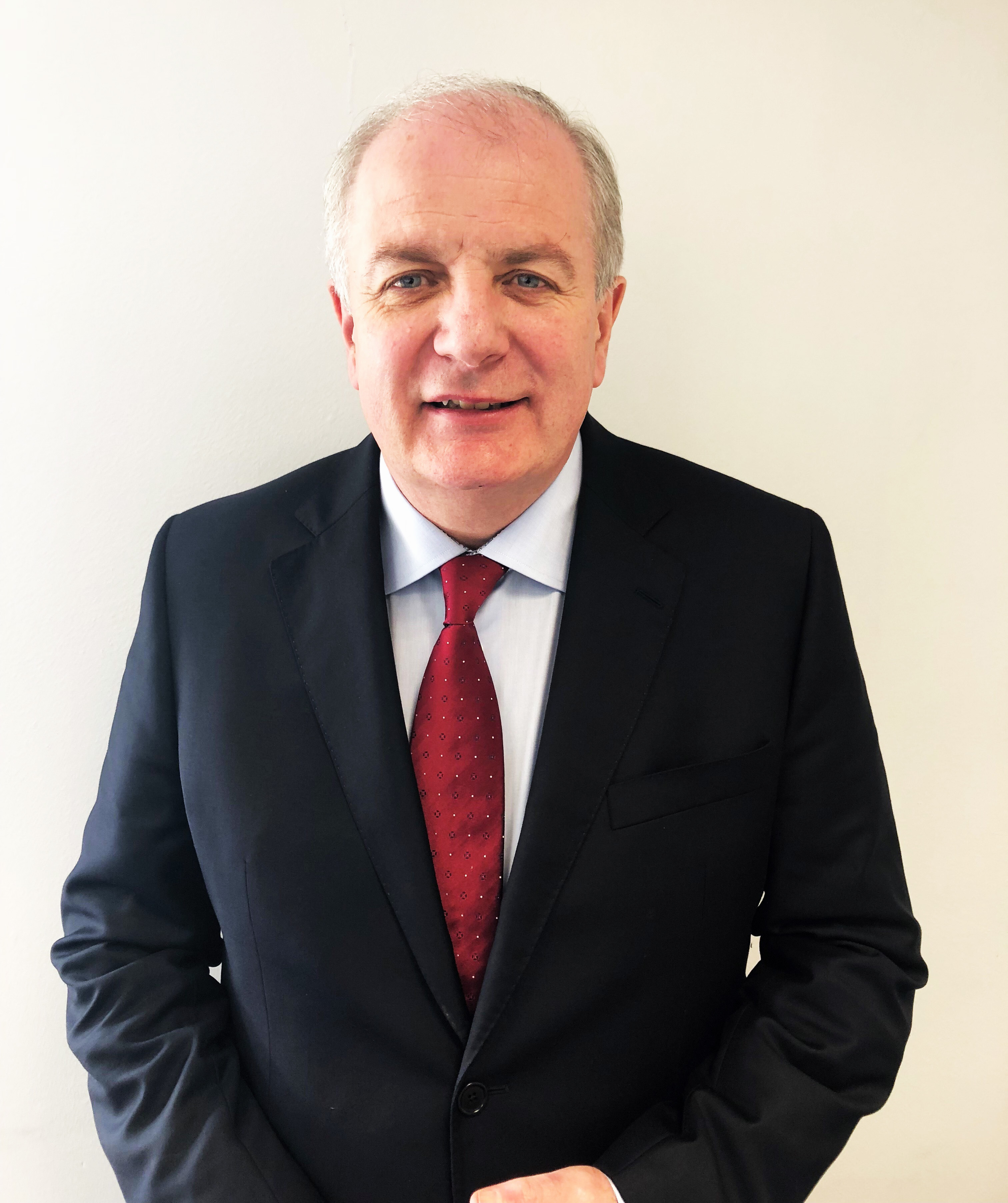
- Born: Liam Duffy; 29 April 1960 (age 66); Kildare, Ireland
- Occupations: Entrepreneur; Businessman
- Known for: Main dragon on the Irish version of Dragons' Den
- Political party: Independent
- Spouse: Orlaith Carmody (m. 1993)
- Children: 4
- Website: gavinduffy.ie

Gavin Duffy (born Liam Duffy; 29 April 1960) is an Irish entrepreneur and businessman who was a former part owner of the HRM Group of Companies, one of Ireland's largest recruitment companies. Duffy is a regular conference speaker at business events in Ireland. He was an unsuccessful candidate in the 2018 presidential election.

== Early life ==
Duffy was the youngest of three brothers and lived as a child in Sallins, County Kildare, where his father, Ned Duffy, had a pig farm. His mother, Anne Duffy, ran The Gem restaurant in Naas. He attended the local primary school, St. Laurence's, in Sallins. The family sold the farm after the outbreaks of swine fever in the early 1970s and moved to Drogheda, County Louth, where they bought a pub. He lived 'above the shop' on West Street, while attending St. Joseph's Secondary School. He later went to Newbridge College in County Kildare where he did his Leaving Certificate.

== Career ==
He set up Boyneside Radio in Drogheda when he left school, changing his birth name of Liam to a "cooler" Gavin. In 1989, he led the consortium in the country's first licensed provincial local radio station, LMFM, which was sold to UTV in 2004 for about €10 million, a sum which Duffy claims holds the Irish and UK record for the highest multiple achieved for a broadcast or publishing asset. He founded his media and management consultancy Gavin Duffy and Associates (formerly Media Training) in 1992 with his wife and business partner Orlaith Carmody. Subsequently, he worked in RTÉ, where he presented the television business programme Marketplace, contributed to Morning Ireland, and presented Holiday Ireland.

Duffy has been a dragon on all eight series of Dragons' Den, produced by RTÉ.

In 2016, Duffy was awarded a Lifetime Achievement Award from the Chamber of Commerce in Drogheda, County Louth. In 2017, he was the moderator of the Fine Gael leadership election debates around the country, which ultimately saw Leo Varadkar become party leader and Taoiseach. He has previously worked as an advisor to both Fianna Fáil and Fine Gael and has coached a number of Taoisigh.

He is the Chairperson of Bizworld Ireland, a non-profit organisation which teaches entrepreneurship to primary school children. He is a patron of Suzanne House and the Drogheda Classical Music Series. He is past Chairman of the Hunting Association of Ireland and has organised events in support of hunting and against protests by animal rights activists.

== 2018 presidential campaign ==
Duffy was a candidate in the 2018 presidential election. He received the first of four required nominations from Meath County Council on 3 September, followed on 10 September by nominations from Carlow and Wicklow county councils. He secured his nomination with the support of Waterford City and County Council on 14 September.

During the course of the election campaign, media reported on an incident in 1978 when, aged 18, Duffy was involved in a vehicular collision in which he caused serious injury to a motorcyclist. He was convicted of careless driving. He expressed regret at the incident. In an interview on RTÉ Radio 1, Duffy also expressed regret over a ban received for dangerous driving when he was 33, for driving his Porsche at almost twice the 40 mph limit towards the brow of a hill. He did not address a ban received at age 21 for driving without tax or insurance. Duffy received 2.2% in the election, finishing last out of the six candidates.

== Personal life ==
Over the last 20 years he has lived in Bellewstown, County Meath, with his wife Orlaith Carmody and four children.
