= Holly Hebe =

Australian singer-songwriter and record producer (born 2003)

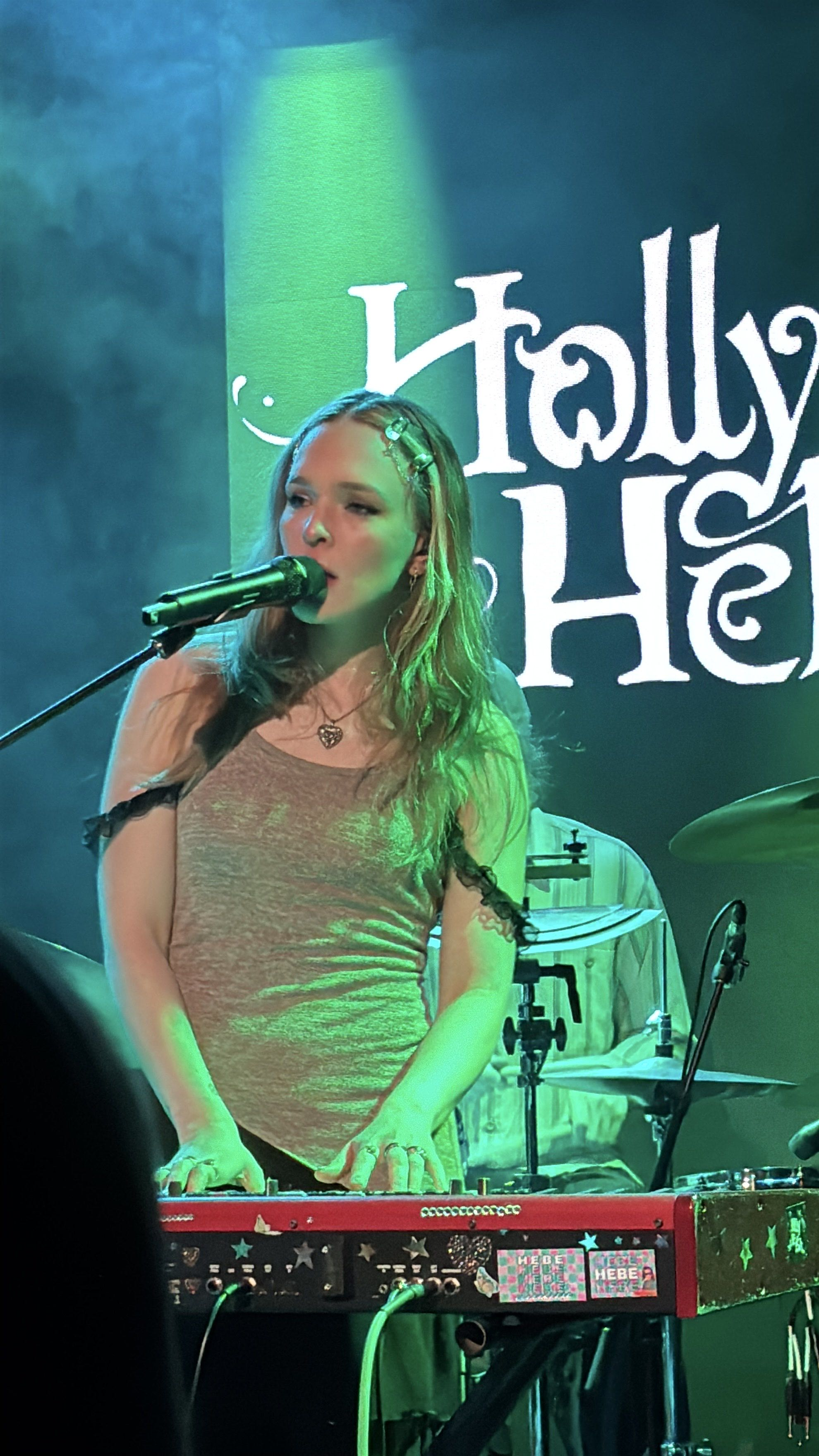
- Holly Hebe performing in Sydney, at the Mood Ring tour

Background information
- Born: Holly Sweeney
- Genres: Pop; indie pop
- Occupations: Singer-songwriter; record producer; pianist; musician
- Instruments: Vocals; piano; production
- Years active: 2020–present
- Label: G.Y.R.O.
- Website: hollyhebe.com

Holly Hebe is an Australian indie pop singer-songwriter, record producer, and musician from the Mornington Peninsula in Melbourne, Victoria.

In July 2026, Hebe released the extended play Mood Ring, which became her first to enter a record chart, debuting at number 23 on the ARIA Albums Chart.

== Early life ==
Hebe began playing the piano at a young age. At high school she commenced writing and producing. She studied Interactive Composition at Victorian College of the Arts.

== Career ==
=== 2020-present ===
Hebe released her debut single "Sink" in September 2020, followed by "We Are Fine" in November 2020.

In November 2022, Hebe released her debut EP Party Mix, proceeded by lead single "Life of the Party." In 2024, Hebe referred to this EP as a "test-the-waters type of thing".

In September 2024, Hebe released her second EP Ruby, named after her pet dog Ruby.

In July 2026, Hebe released her third EP Mood Ring, which AIR described as "a deeply intimate and sonically immersive body of work exploring heartbreak, superstition, nostalgia and the emotional chaos of growing up."

== Discography ==
=== Extended plays ===
List of EPs, with selected details
Title	Details	Peak chart positions
Title	Details	AUS
Party Mix	Released: 24 November 2022; Label: Holly Sweeney; Format: digital download	—
Ruby	Released: 20 September 2024; Label: Holiday Records, G.Y.R.O. (HRDROP020); Format: LP, digital download	—
Mood Ring	Released: 17 July 2026; Label: Holiday Records, G.Y.R.O. (HRDROP056); Format: CD, LP, digital download	23
