= Liadh Ní Riada =

Irish politician (born 1966)

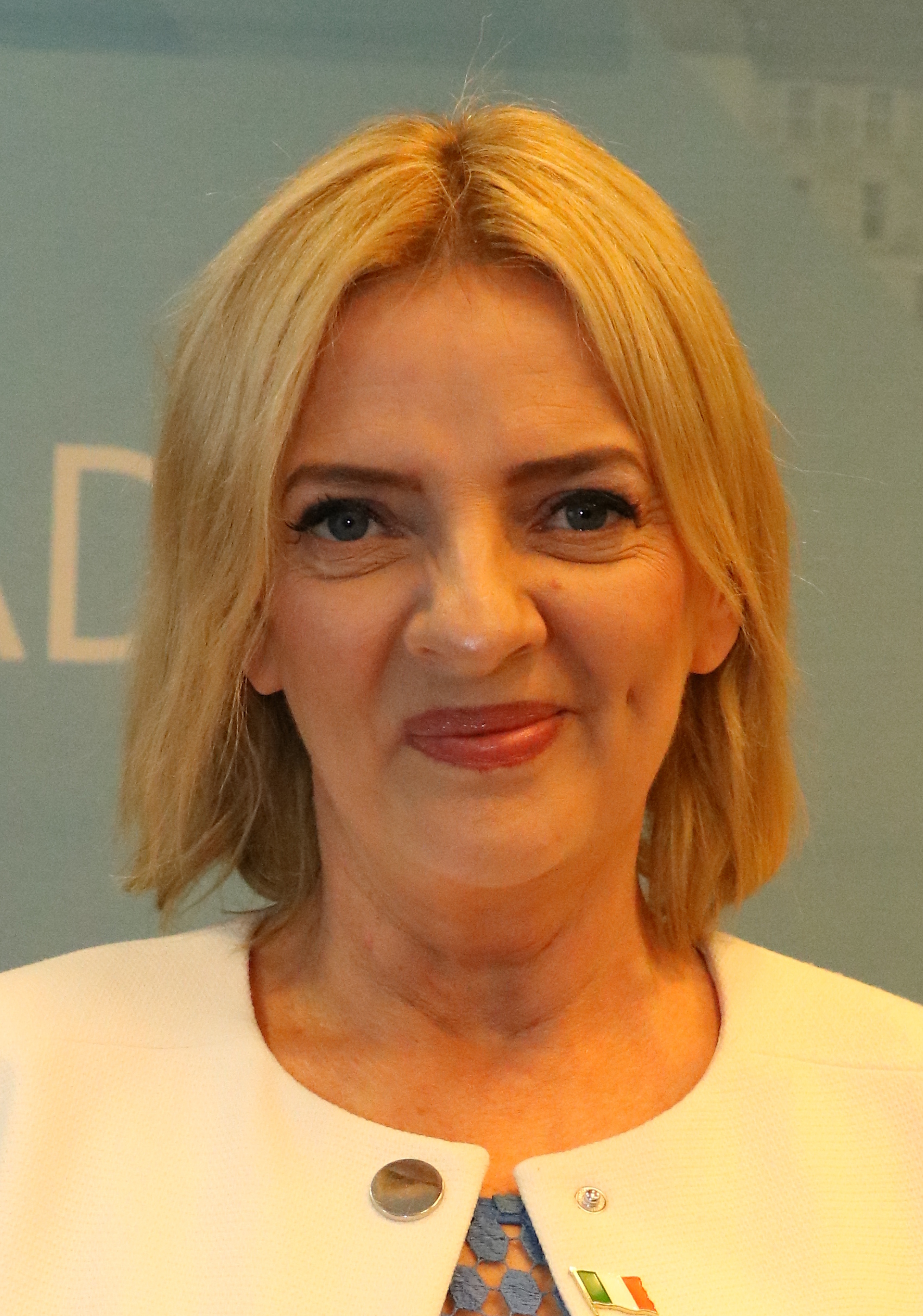
- Ní Riada in 2017

Member of the European Parliament
- In office 1 July 2014 – 1 July 2019
- Constituency: South

Personal details
- Born: 28 November 1966 (age 59) Dublin, Ireland
- Party: Independent (since 2024); Sinn Féin (until 2024)
- Spouses: Fiachra Ó hAodha (m. 1996; died 1997); Nicky Forde (m. 2012)
- Children: 3
- Parent: Seán Ó Riada (father)
- Education: Dublin Institute of Technology; Cork Institute of Technology

Liadh Ní Riada (pronounced [ˈl̠ʲiə n̠ʲiː ˈɾˠiəd̪ˠə]; born 28 November 1966) is an Irish cultural activist and former Sinn Féin politician who served as a Member of the European Parliament (MEP) for the South constituency from 2014 to 2019. She was the Sinn Féin candidate in the 2018 presidential election. As of December 2024, Ní Riada is director of a cultural centre in Ballyvourney, County Cork.

She left Sinn Féin some time after her unsuccessful presidential election campaign and became an independent. She unsuccessfully contested the 2025 Seanad election as an independent candidate.

== Media and cultural activity ==
Ní Riada is a former television producer and director and she served on the board tasked with setting up TG4, the Irish-language television channel. She has directed and produced several documentaries, and ran her own production company for several years. Ní Riada has described herself as passionate about heritage and culture, and she has been a vocal advocate for Irish language rights.

In July 2020, Comharchumann Forbartha Mhúscraí, a Ballingeary-based community development co-operative for the Muskerry Gaeltacht, appointed Ní Riada as language planning officer, to encourage use of Irish in the area. In December 2020 she was nominated by Sinn Féin to the board of Foras na Gaeilge. In February 2022 she became director of Ionad Cultúrtha an Dochtúir Ó Loingsigh, a cultural centre in Ballyvourney.

== Political career ==
Ní Riada's involvement in politics began in 2011 when she joined Sinn Féin as the party's national Irish language officer, having been inspired by her first husband Fiachra to get involved in politics. Three years later, in 2014, Ní Riada was selected as the Sinn Féin candidate for the South constituency for the 2014 European Parliament elections.

=== European Parliament ===
Ní Riada ran her 2014 campaign for the European Parliament on an anti-austerity message, calling for job creation and an end to forced emigration from Ireland. During the campaign, she also raised awareness of the increase in child poverty in Ireland, and the need for rural regeneration. She secured 125,309 first preference votes, the second highest of all MEPs in Ireland, and was elected on the fourth count with 132,590 votes.

As an MEP, Ní Riada sat on three Committees of the European Parliament: Budgets, Culture and Education, and Fisheries.

She was a coordinator for the European United Left–Nordic Green Left group on the Budgets Committee.

On the committee on Culture and Education, Ní Riada has highlighted what she called the "language discrimination" in the EU. Through this committee, she has highlighted what she called the "hardships" many artists have to go through to earn a living. Since 2017 Ní Riada has been a member of the Culture and Educations Brexit monitoring group.

On the Fisheries Committee, she has called for a "fairer deal" for Irish fishermen. Ní Riada has been critical of the EU's Common Fisheries Policy, saying that she believes Irish fisheries have not received their fair share of the fishing quota. Ní Riada has also campaigned for measures to reduce plastic pollution, particularly in the oceans.

=== 2018 presidential election ===
On 16 September 2018, Ní Riada was selected by Sinn Féin to contest that year's Irish presidential election. The party, in deciding to challenge incumbent Michael D. Higgins, said there was "an appetite for political and social change" in Ireland.

Ní Riada's campaign focused on the Irish language, a united Ireland, and social justice. She called for the presidential salary to be cut in half and said that she would only serve a single presidential term if elected. During the campaign she stated she would wear a remembrance poppy to commemorate the war dead of the First World War.

Ni Ríada received 6.38% of first preference votes in the election, which was held on 26 October 2018.

=== Since 2019 ===
Ní Riada lost her European Parliament seat at the 2019 European election. In March 2021 Sinn Féin selected her to contest Cork North-West at the next Dáil election (which was held in 2024) but in 2023 she announced that she was leaving politics. However, Foras na Gaeilge nominated her to contest the Cultural and Educational Panel in the 2025 Seanad election. She ran as an independent and was unsuccessful; Pauline Tully of Sinn Féin was among the five elected.
